= 10th (Service) Battalion, South Wales Borderers (1st Gwent) =

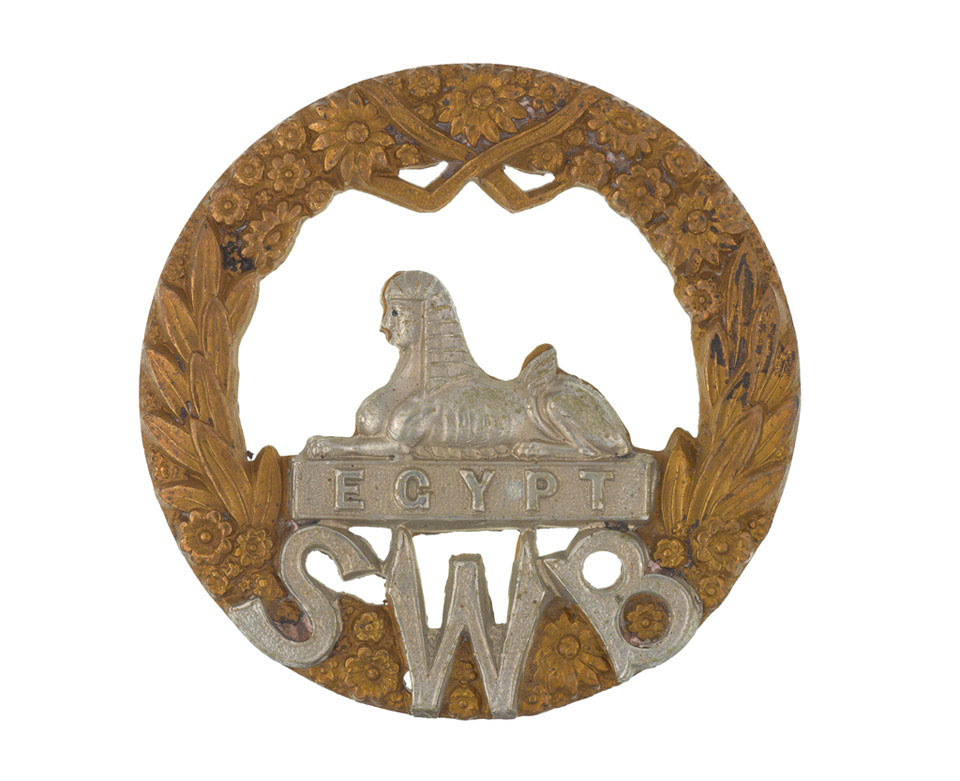
- c. 1896 cap badge of the South Wales Borderers
- Active: 10 October 1914–3 July 1919
- Allegiance: United Kingdom
- Branch: New Army
- Type: Pals battalion
- Role: Infantry
- Size: One Battalion
- Part of: 38th (Welsh) Division
- Garrison/HQ: Brecon
- Patron: Welsh National Executive Committee
- Engagements: Battle of the Somme; Third Battle of Ypres; Hundred Days Offensive

The 1st Gwent Battalion was a Welsh 'Pals battalion' formed as part of 'Kitchener's Army' during World War I. Raised by local initiative in Monmouthshire and Glamorgan, it became the 10th (Service) Battalion of the local regiment, the South Wales Borderers ('10th SWB'). It served in 38th (Welsh) Division and took part in the division's costly attack on Mametz Wood during the Battle of the Somme. The battalion continued to serve on the Western Front, including the Third Battle of Ypres and the final Hundred Days Offensive.

== Recruitment ==
Alfred Leete's recruitment poster for Kitchener's Army.

On 6 August 1914, less than 48 hours after Britain's declaration of war, Parliament sanctioned an increase of 500,000 men for the Regular British Army, and the newly appointed Secretary of State for War, Earl Kitchener of Khartoum issued his famous call to arms: 'Your King and Country Need You', urging the first 100,000 volunteers to come forward. A flood of volunteers poured into the recruiting offices across the country and were formed into 'Service' battalions of the county regiments and the 'first hundred thousand' were enlisted within days. This group of six divisions with supporting arms became known as Kitchener's First New Army, or 'K1'. K2, K3 and K4 followed shortly afterwards.

However, these were soon joined by groups of men from particular localities or backgrounds who wished to serve together. Starting in London and Liverpool, the phenomenon of 'Pals battalions' quickly spread across the country, as local recruiting committees offered complete units to the War Office (WO), which soon constituted the Fifth New Army (K5). One such organisation was the 'Welsh National Executive Committee' (WNEC). On 28 September 1914 David Lloyd George addressed a meeting of representatives from all over Wales, at which the WNEC was formed to seek permission to form a complete Welsh Army Corps of two divisions. The WO accepted the proposal on 10 October and enrolment began. The '1st Gwent' battalion began recruiting at Ebbw Vale and Cwm, then at Abercarn, Abertillery, Crumlin, Newport, Pontnewydd and Tredegar, many of the men being coal miners and iron workers. Sir Hamar Greenwood, MP, a political associate of Lloyd George and a former officer in the 4th (Royal Montgomeryshire Militia) Battalion, South Wales Borderers, was appointed the unit's first commanding officer (CO) with the rank of Lieutenant-Colonel. His second-in-command was Major W.H. Pitten, formerly of the Welsh Divisional Army Service Corps of the Territorial Force (TF) and a coopted member of the Monmouthshire TF Association.

The recruits were assembled at the regimental depot of the South Wales Borderers (SWB) at Brecon, and by 4 December the 1st Gwent, now the 10th (Service) Battalion, SWB, was 320 strong. By the end of 1914 when it went to Colwyn Bay for training it was already 600 strong and batches of recruits continued to come in. By March 1915 it was well over its establishment strength and was able to form 'E' Company as a depot and draft-finding company. At Colwyn Bay the battalion joined 130th (3rd Welsh) Brigade of 43rd Division (1st Division, Welsh Army Corps), serving alongside 17th (S) Bn, Royal Welsh Fusiliers (2nd North Welsh) (17th RWF), 11th (S) Bn, SWB (2nd Gwent), and 16th (S) Bn, Welsh Regiment (Cardiff City). In April 1915 the Fourth New Army (K4) was converted into reserve units for K1–K3, and the K5 formations took over their numbers: thus 130th Bde became 115th Bde in 38th (Welsh) Division on 29 April; at the same time the over-ambitious plan for a complete Welsh Army Corps was scaled back to this single division.

== Training ==
The rush of Kitchener recruits had overwhelmed the Army's ability to absorb them, so the Pals battalions of K5 were left for some time in the hands of the recruiting committees. Until khaki cloth could be supplied, most of the men recruited by the WNEC were clothed in the grey Welsh cloth known as Brethyn Llwyd. Battalion training and selection of specialists such as signallers was proceeding well. But with units scattered across North Wales there was no opportunity for divisional training. However, in the summer the division began to concentrate around Winchester, with 11th SWB joining at Hursley Park in July, later moving to Hazeley Down Camp. The division trained for open warfare on the Hampshire downland, leaving trench warfare to be learned when the troops reached the theatre of war. It was not until November that enough rifles arrived for all the men to undertake their musketry course. 38th (W) Division was now warned for service on the Western Front. On 3 December 10th SWB under Lt-Col Greenwood left Hazeley Down for Southampton and crossed to Le Havre that night, landing the following day. It then went by train to join the divisional concentration at Aire on 6 December and marched to its training area at Quernes.

=== 13th (Reserve) Battalion ===
In July 1915 the depot ('E') companies of the 10th and 11th SWB moved to Coed Coch Camp near St Asaph to form 13th (Reserve) Battalion, SWB, as a local reserve battalion with the role of training reinforcements for the two service battalions. It was commanded by Lt-Col W.H. Pitten, previously second-in-command of 10th SWB. In September it moved to Kinmel Park Camp near Rhyl, where it joined 13th Reserve Brigade. It sent its first drafts overseas to the 10th and 11th SWB in January 1916 and continued to do so regularly, such that it did not complete its own fourth company until June, when the Derby Scheme brought a surge in recruits. Previously, many of the recruits sent to the battalion were classed as labourers and were transferred to works battalions of the King's (Liverpool Regiment) and the Cheshire Regiment or to munitions work, 13th SWB forming its own Works Company to handle them. In May Lt-Col Pitten was replaced by Lt-Col J.A.F. Field from the Cheshire Regiment. On 1 September 1916 the Local Reserve battalions were transferred to the Training Reserve (TR) and 13th (R) Bn SWB became 59th Training Reserve Battalion, though the training staff retained their SWB cap badges. On 4 July 1917 it was redesignated 213th (Infantry) Battalion, TR, and on 1 November it was transferred to become 51st (Graduated) Battalion, Cheshire Regiment in 194th (2/1st South Scottish) Brigade of 65th (2nd Lowland) Division at Curragh Camp in Ireland. It remained at the Curragh after 65th Division was disbanded in March 1918. After the Armistice with Germany it was converted into a service battalion on 6 February 1919 and was then absorbed into 1/4th Bn, Cheshire Regiment, on 28 March 1919.

== Service ==
After two weeks at Quernes, 10th SWB was ordered up with the rest of 38th (W) Division to Saint-Venant, where it was in reserve for XI Corps. 10th SWB was billeted at Robecq and parties were attached to the Guards Division for their introduction to the front line. The battalion suffered its first casualties: two men wounded. It completed its training at Robecq and from mid-January 1916 it began a long sequence of tours of duty in the trenches between the La Bassée Canal and Fauquissart, at Festubert in February and March, or at Givenchy in April, alternating with spells in brigade or divisional reserve. The Festubert area was badly flooded and the line consisted of detached posts or 'islands', while Givenchy was more dangerous because the drier ground made mine warfare possible, and the enemy could fire a mine at any time. In May the battalion was in the Moated Grange sector just north of Neuve-Chapelle, where patrol actions in No man's land were common. During this period of trench warfare, 10th SWB's casualties amounted to 2 officers and 37 other ranks (ORs) killed, 2 officers and 106 ORs wounded. Lt-Col Greenwood left the battalion in April, being recalled to London to a post at the WO where he later served under Lloyd George. Lieutenant-Col Sidney Wilkinson, DSO, of the West Yorkshire Regiment was transferred from command of the divisional pioneers, 19th Welch Regiment, to take over 10th SWB.

At this time the British Expeditionary Force (BEF) was preparing for that summer's 'Big Push' on the Western Front (the Battle of the Somme). In June 38th (W) Division was withdrawn from the line and sent to a training area around Tincques and Villers-Brûlin. At the end of the month it began a long and tiring march south and on 3 July it arrived at Buire-sur-l'Ancre in XVII Corps' reserve.

=== Mametz Wood ===
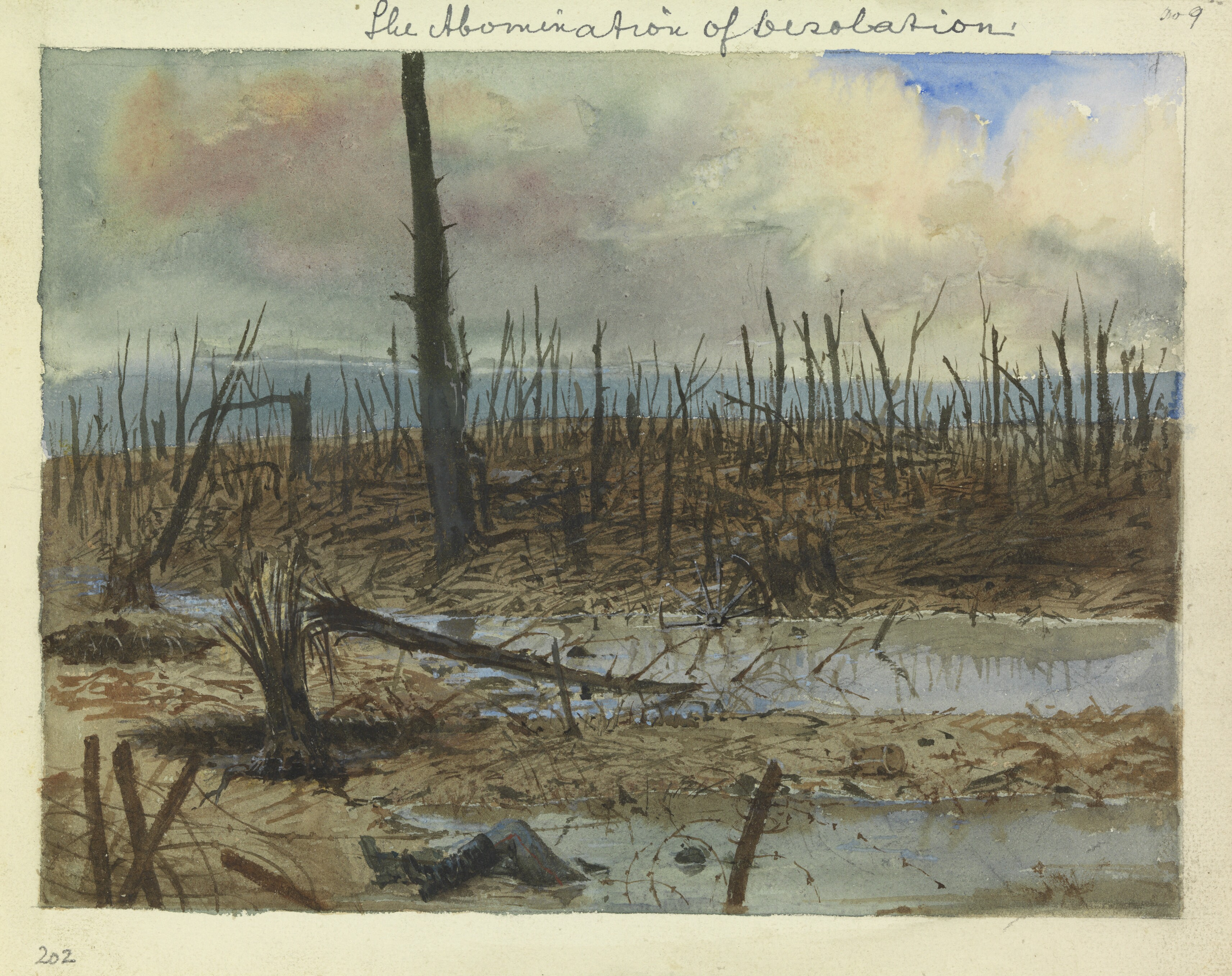
The Abomination of Desolation, sketch by J.B. Morrall of Mametz Wood after the 1916 fighting.

The Somme Offensive had begun on 1 July with a disastrous attack across a wide front. 38th (W) Division had been warned to accompany the cavalry in exploiting a breakthrough towards Bapaume. There was no breakthrough: instead the division was switched to the Mametz sector, where there had been some success. On 5 July it took over the front line and prepared to capture Mametz Wood. The initial attack on the south-east corner, the 'Hammerhead', was assigned to 115th Bde, which was to advance on 7 July across the valley on a frontage of two battalions, with 10th SWB in reserve in Montauban Alley. After the initial attack was held up by machine gun fire, another attempt was ordered for 11.15 after a half-hour bombardment of the eastern edge of the wood by heavy artillery. Brigadier-General H.J. Evans of 115th Bde summoned Lt-Col Wilkinson and ordered him to send up two companies of 10th SWB, supported by the other two. Wilkinson was ordered to press home the attack 'with vigour'. Heavy rain set in, and 10th SWB's progress to the front line was slow. It eventually attacked, with Wilkinson personally leading the second wave, but gained nothing, the Hammerhead remaining out of reach. Wilkinson fell wounded. A third attack at 15.15 after a fresh artillery bombardment achieved nothing. None of the infantry could get within 250 yards (230 m) of the Hammerhead, and were lying out in the valley under fire, tired out and wet through from the rain. 115th Brigade was not reorganised in time to take part in another attack by the neighbouring division at 20.00, and it was eventually ordered to withdraw to bivouacs. 10th SWB's casualties had been relatively low: 2 ORs killed and about 30 wounded, but Lt-Col Wilkinson died of his wounds. The second-in-command, Maj Charles Harvey, was promoted to take over the command from him.

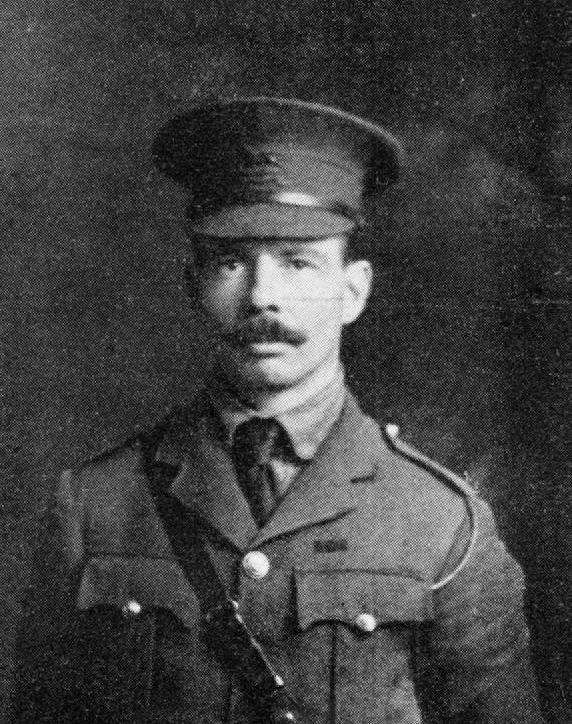
Lt-Col Sidney Wilkinson, died of wounds received at Mametz Wood (shown wearing the cap badge of the West Yorkshire Regiment and the ribbon of the DSO).

Early on 10 July Mametz Wood was attacked with the full weight of 38th (W) Division, 113th and 114th Bdes leading, with 115th Bde in reserve. The attack made progress into the wood from the south, but bogged down in the Hammerhead, where the Germans counter-attacked. 10th SWB and 17th RWF from 115th Bde were then committed to the fighting, 10th SWB moving off at 13.00 to support 114th Bde and capturing the eastern portion of the wood without many casualties, despite heavy enemy shelling. Harvey deployed his men to continue the advance when he received orders to pause his attack until after a fresh bombardment. At 16.00 10th SWB attacked with dash, making good initial progress and taking some prisoners, while the fleeing Germans were caught by 11th SWB's fire from Caterpillar Wood and Marlborough Copse. Opposition then solidified, and 10th SWB's bombers made slow progress along the trenches, and the battalion was held up short of its objectives. Elsewhere the attack was less successful, but by the end of the day the southern half of Mametz Wood was in the division's hands, with 10th SWB holding most of the Hammerhead. During the night 115th Bde took over control of the fighting and at 11.40 next morning Evans was ordered to make a new attack to take the rest of the wood. Deciding that he could not organise a formal attack with artillery support, he decided to launch a surprise attack at 15.00 with the bayonet. Just 15 minutes before the attack, an unexpected British artillery barrage on the north of the wood caused numerous casualties and disorganisation among the troops waiting to attack, and was followed by a German counter-barrage. The attack was finally made at 15.30 after both side's artillery stopped. Two companies of 11th SWB went forward, supported by two of 10th SWB's, but progress through the fallen trees and undergrowth was very slow. Brigadier-Gen Evans and Maj Harvey were both wounded and on his own initiative, Lt-Col J.R. Gaussen of 11th SWB collected detachments of 10th SWB to reinforce his battalion. Eventually two companies of 11th and 10th SWB fought their way through to the northern edge of Mametz Wood and dug in. However, 17th RWF and 16th Welsh further left could not quite reach the edge of the wood, leaving 11th SWB's flank exposed. With his men exhausted and under constant bombardment, Gaussen reluctantly withdrew the men into the interior of the wood. 10th SWB's total casualties in Mametz Wood had risen to 3 officers and 29 ORs killed and wounded, together with 9 officers and 140 ORs wounded. 38th (W) Division was relieved that night.

Two days after being relieved, 10th SWB was back in the line in the Somme sector, albeit at Hébuterne where the fighting had died down after 1 July. At the end of July the division moved to the Ypres Salient, where it held trenches facing Pilckem Ridge, spending the time improving the trenches and carrying out raids. Casualties were light in late 1916 (10th SWB suffered 1 officer and 8 ORs killed or missing, 1 officer and 49 ORs wounded), but the drain on resources on the Somme front meant that the battalions in the Salient received few reinforcements, and remained considerably understrength. On 27 December Lt-Col Harvey (recovered from his wound and promoted to permanent command of 10th SWB) reported that he could not find enough men to garrison all the positions required by the divisional defence scheme, but it was not until March 1917 that the battalion received any substantial reinforcements (244 in the month). Early in 1917 the enemy shelling increased, the 10th SWB losing 8 killed and 33 wounded in the first four months of the year.

=== Pilckem Ridge ===
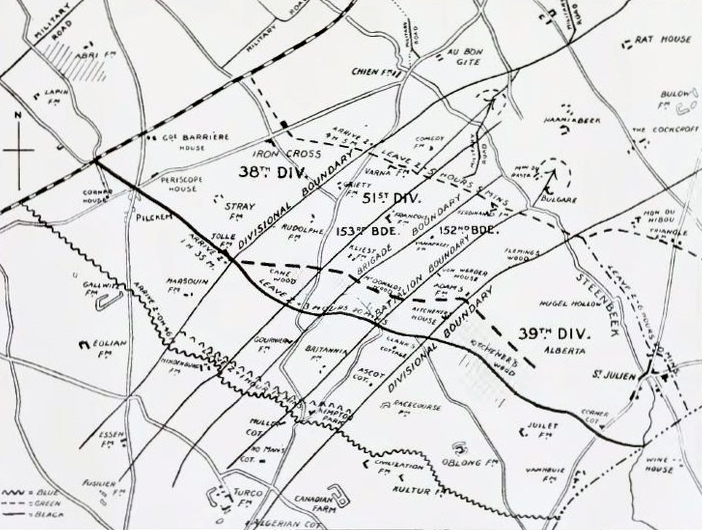
38th (W) Division's attack at Pilckem Ridge, 31 July 1917.

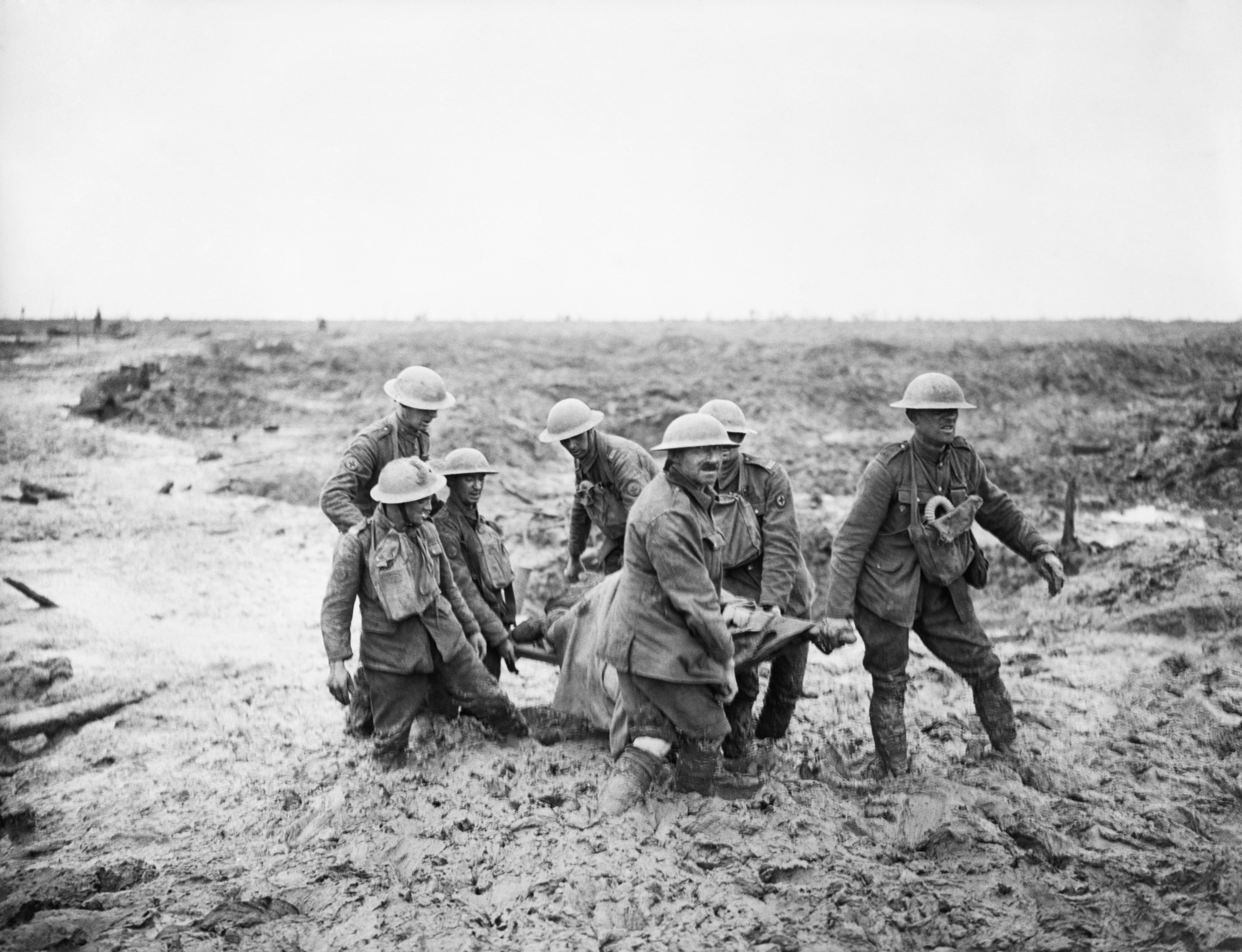
Stretcher-bearers struggle through the mud after the Battle of Pilckem Ridge, 1 August 1917 (Photograph by John Warwick Brooke).

In May 1917 38th (W) Division was warned that the British would launch an offensive on the division 's front during the summer, and it began preparations, including digging assembly trenches and even a new front line trench 300 yards (270 m) closer to the enemy. The Germans seem to have regarded this as a feint, and took little notice: 10th SWB got away with only 3 men killed and 1 officer and 15 ORs wounded in May–June despite suffering a destructive bombardment on 3 June. The battalion also received a draft of 112 men in June. That month the division was given its role in the forthcoming operation, and towards the end of June was taken out of the line and went to the St Hilaire area to train for the attack over replica trenches and strongpoints. On 16 July the return march to the front began, and by 20 July 38th (W) Division was back in the line. The battalions were constantly called on for working parties to complete preparations for the much-delayed Ypres Offensive, and German artillery was active over both the front and rear areas attempting to disrupt the preparations with high explosive and the new Mustard gas.

The opening of the offensive was finally fixed for 31 July. 10th SWB marched up to the Corps concentration area on 29 July and started for the assembly position soon after dark the following night. It left one company at the Yser Canal to help lay bridges, while the other three took up their assembly positions in divisional reserve. Zero was at 03.50. The plan was for 113th and 114th Bdes to advance up the ridge and capture the first three objectives (the Blue, Black and Green Lines), including the fortified Pilckem village and the pillbox at 'Iron Cross' crossroads. Then two battalions of 115th Bde were to pass through and descend from Iron Cross Ridge to capture the line of the Steenbeek stream (the 'Green Dotted Line'). As the attack progressed, 10th SWB moved up to the old German front line; although it suffered a few casualties from shellfire it arrived at 'Kiel Cottage' on schedule at 06.50. The men took shelter in 'Caddy Lane' to await further orders. Although the Germans began collecting for a counter-attack, runners from the front found it difficult and dangerous to move through the heavy shelling, which also cut any telephone lines the signallers had been able to lay. Thus 11th SWB and 17th RWF got no support when the counter-attack came in. and were forced back over the Steenbeek. During the afternoon 10th SWB moved up to the Iron Cross Ridge and began digging in while D Company was sent forward to reinforce 11th SWB as it consolidated its position. By now communications to the rear were working, and a second German attack was stopped by artillery, Lewis gun and rifle fire. During the afternoon it had begun to rain, and the positions in the Steenbeek valley became very muddy, hindering all further movement. 10th SWB adopted a system of sending Lewis guns back to Battalion Headquarters (HQ) at 'Rudolphe Farm' to be cleaned, and the transport officer succeeded in getting rations up to the troops that night. Next day 11th SWB was ordered to recapture the bridgehead over the Steenbeek at 'Au Bon Gîte', but the acting CO was killed carrying out the reconnaissance and the Brigade Major who accompanied him decided that 11th SWB was too weak to make the attempt and cancelled the orders. The rest of 10th SWB was therefore sent forward with additional ammunition to strengthen the line, but although the Germans shelled the battalions heavily, they did not try to attack through the mud. The men of 10th and 11th SWB withdrew 200 yards (180 m) to shelter from the bombardment in shellholes, but reoccupied the line along the Steenbeek afterwards. 115th Brigade was relieved from the front line on the night of 1/2 August, though it took until 4 August to gather the scattered survivors of 11th SWB along the Steenbeek. Both battalions then withdrew. Despite being in support, 10th SWB had lost 41 ORs killed or missing, 6 officers and 159 ORs wounded. The whole division went back to Proven on 6 August, where it got two weeks rest and 10th SWB received a draft of 85 reinforcements.

38th (W) Division returned to the line after the Battle of Langemarck. 115th Brigade was in reserve, between Pilckem and the Yser Canal, working on defences and road repair under harassing shellfire and bombing, 10th SWB suffering 4 killed and 20 wounded even before it moved forward into the battle zone. On 19 August it lost all its pack-mules and rations, caught by shellfire. The battalion moved up to a position near Au Bon Gîte on 22 August, supporting 11th SWB in the front line. Battalion HQ was in a captured concrete pillbox that resisted heavy German shells, but C Company HQ was hit on 25 August, and B Company's next day. Other battalions of 115th Bde attempted to capture 'Eagle Trench' on 27 August, but in the mud they were unable to keep up with the barrage and were hit by enfilade fire from the 'White House' strongpoint. Nevertheless, a platoon of 11th SWB, sent up to maintain contact, managed to capture White House. 11th SWB came under heavy shellfire and had to be reinforced by 10th SWB, but together they held on to White House, the only success of the day. 10th SWB maintained its position until it was relieved and went into reserve at Elverdinge, having suffered 28 killed and 89 wounded, while another 50 had been evacuated sick from Shell shock and gas. The battalion came out of the line with only 10 officers and 302 men. Although it did another spell of duty on the canal bank from 9 September, it was not in the front line. After 38th (W) Division was relieved on 11 September it left the Ypres Salient and moved south to the Armentières sector.

=== Winter 1917–18 ===
Although Armentières and the Lys Valley was considered a quiet sector, the division had a wide front to hold with weak battalions (companies were reduced to two platoons each). Much of the time was spent trying to drain and improve the chain of defensive positions in the low-lying and waterlogged country, which were mainly breastworks rather than trenches. The Germans in this sector were energetic raiders. On 19 September, soon after it had taken over the sector, one of 10th SWB's detached posts was raided by a large number of Germans after a 10-minute bombardment, but an officer went up from the main position when the NCO in charge was wounded, and he and the junior NCOs organised such a strong defence that the raiders were held off and then caught by the British counter-barrage. 10th SWB launched its own big raid on the night of 7/8 November, with 10 officers and 270 men – virtually the entire strength of A, B and C Companies. The target was 'Incandescent Trench', which had been systematically bombarded for several days and its wire cut on a front of 300 yards (270 m). The raiders penetrated through to the German support line 200 yards (180 m) further back, and protected by a Box barrage they remained there for over an hour, taking prisoners and blowing up concrete dugouts. They withdrew having lost 5 killed and 50 wounded, mostly lightly, all of whom were evacuated as the raiders withdrew. During the winter 38th (W) Division helped to train troops of the 1st Portuguese Division. Then in mid-January 1918 38th (W) Division was withdrawn for an extended rest.

By early 1918 the BEF was suffering a manpower crisis. Brigades had to be reduced from four to three battalions, and the surplus war-formed battalions were broken up to provide reinforcements for others. On 16 February 10th SWB received a draft of 150 men from 11th SWB, which was among the battalions being disbanded.

=== German Spring Offensive ===
The long-anticipated German spring offensive opened on 21 March 1918 against Third and Fifth Armies. 38th (W) Division had returned to the line in the Wez Macquart area south of Armentières in mid-February, but this sector under First Army was not affected, though enemy shelling grew heavier. On 28 March B and D Companies of 10th SWB carried out a successful raid on the enemy lines, but next day the division was rushed south to the Albert area to reinforce Third Army, arriving on 2 April. Next day it moved up to support two divisions that had been badly hit in the fighting and were now holding an extemporised line along the River Ancre. 115th Brigade went to Hédauville in close support, but also to work on fresh defences, and 10th SWB was joined by a draft of 144 reinforcements, bringing it up to reasonable strength. The line in front of Albert held firm, and 115th Bde was not engaged during the Battle of the Ancre on 5 April. The German offensive now ended on this front. The division took over the line on the night of 11/12 April, occupying a jumble of hastily dug trenches. 113th Brigade carried out an operation on 22 April to improve the position around Aveluy Wood, and 115th Bde took over the captured trenches on the high ground 25/26 April. It remained in this position during May. On 9 May the enemy made a determined attack to recover the high ground, pushing the neighbouring Australians back for a while. The division was relieved on 20 May.

While out of the line the division underwent intensive training, particularly in shooting, but battalions had to take turns to work on defences. It then returned to the Aveluy Wood sector until 19 July, carrying out active patrolling and raids to ensure complete control of No man's land, but also suffering from heavy bombardments and a damaging raid. Lieutenant-Col Harvey was wounded on 9 June and temporarily replaced by Lt-Col Arthur Bowen. 318th US Infantry Regiment was attached to the division at this time for their introduction to trench warfare. The division spent another period out of the line, absorbing replacements, before returning to Aveluy on 5 August.

=== Albert & Bapaume ===
10th SWB arrived at Aveluy having practised for a planned attack, but the attack was called off after Fourth Army launched the Allied Hundred Days Offensive with the Battle of Amiens on 8 August, causing the Germans to retire along the Ancre on Third Army's front. Third Army immediately began planning its own offensive. This began with the Battle of Albert on 21 August. V Corps gave 38th (W) Division the task of crossing the flooded Ancre: 113rd Brigade at Albert, 114th Bde at Hamel, a few miles north, and then they were to converge towards Pozières. 115th Brigade was to support 113rd Bde and later deal with the triangle of ground between the other two brigades. 113th and 114th Brigades slipped troops across the river on the nights of 21/22 and 22/23 August and launched their preliminary attack at 04.45 on 23 August. That morning 115th Bde got parties across the river at Aveluy, where 151st Field Company, Royal Engineers, built a bridge. 10th SWB crossed that evening, suffering some casualties from shellfire. The attack was then launched at 01.00 next morning. 17th RWF led 115th Bde, with 10th SWB following to 'mop up' behind them, securing large numbers of prisoners. Long before daybreak the two battalions were established on what they believed was their objective. Dawn revealed, however, that they were still over half a mile (800 m) short, and in attempting to get forward in daylight they were held up by a trench in front of Ovillers. 10th SWB was sent left to deal with it, but was itself stopped by fire from a northern continuation of the same trench. The division had achieved all its targets except Ovillers, and at 16.00 it was ordered to resume its advance, with 115th Bde skirting past Ovillers along the nigher ground to the north. This began at 17.30 and progress was slow, but the turning movement caused the enemy to abandon Ovillers; by 22.00 the ruins were clear of them. The pursuit began at 02.30 next morning, the troops moving by compass bearing over the broken countryside in the dark. 115th Bde met little opposition in quickly occupying its objectives between Mametz Wood and Bazentin-le-Petit. In the late evening of 25 August the enemy made an unsuccessful counter-attack on 10th SWB in Bazentin-le-Petit. 10th SWB's casualties had been relatively light, except among the transport section, which had come under heavy shellfire.

The continuation of the operation next day (26 August) formed part of the Second Battle of Bapaume. 115th Brigade pushed along the valley south of High Wood, enveloping the enemy there and capturing 15 machine guns and 40 prisoners who had not retreated in time. 114th Brigade finally captured High Wood, mainly due to its flank guard of A and C Companies 10th SWB supported by a Troop of the 20th Hussars, though 10th SWB suffered 40 casualties. At 04.00 next morning 114th Bde passed through 115th's positions and gained some more ground before holding off fierce counter-attacks from the enemy's strong position in Delville Wood, one of which pushed C Company of 10th SWB back until a defensive flank was formed. Next day, while the artillery bombarded this position in preparation for a major attack by 38th (W) Division, 113th Bde felt the enemy's resistance weakening, and pushed forward to clear Longueval, with 10th SWB moving up in support. The brigade was then stopped by artillery fire, which caught C and D Companies of 10th SWB in the open, the men having to seek cover in shellholes, while A and B Companies pressed forward and got mixed up with 113th Bde. The battalion was extricated after dark and was rested during 38th (W) Division's setpiece attack next day. On 30 August 10th SWB attacked at 03.30 and covered over 3,000 yards (2,700 m) to capture Lesbœufs. That night the battalion received a draft of six officers and 120 ORs, but these hardly made up for the losses so far.

The enemy positions were bombarded on 31 August and next day the division attacked once more. 114th Brigade was launched to take Morval, and then 115th Bde was to pass through to capture Sailly-Saillisel. 114th Brigade achieved its objective after a desperate fight, and at 05.30 115th Bde began its advance, 2nd and 17th RWF leading with 10th SWB in support. However, the enemy held some commanding ground in the gap between 38th and the neighbouring 17th (Northern) Division; enfilade fire from this position caused heavy casualties to 115th Bde and two companies of 10th SWB had to be turned aside to deal with it. Catching an enemy counter-attack in flank, they successfully seized the position, capturing prisoners and machine guns and getting in touch with 17th (N) Division. 113th Brigade completed the capture of Sailly-Saillisel. This success meant that on 2 September 115th Bde could form up in the ground between Morval and Sailly-Saillisel unseen by the enemy. It attacked through 113th Bde at 17.00, but the latter was so mixed up with the enemy that the Creeping barrage could not begin close enough and the attack failed against heavy machine gun fire. The battalion rallied and held an extemporised line short of the objective, and the enemy withdrew during the night. At daybreak on 3 September 113th and 115th Bdes occupied the old German trench system. 114th Brigade then pushed on towards the Canal du Nord while 115th rested, 10th SWB suffering a severe gas shelling on 4 September. Although all the bridges had been destroyed, 38th (W) Division had established a small bridgehead over the canal before it was relieved on 5 September. In two weeks' fighting it had cleared much of the old Somme battlefield that had been fought over for months in 1916. 10th SWB's casualties in that time had been 12 officers and 294 ORs.

=== Hindenburg Line ===
38th (W) Division went back into the line on 11 September. 115th Brigade held the front, which was in a support trench of the British trenches dug in 1917 facing the Hindenburg Line. Although no advance was made for a week, the enemy made repeated attempts to drive the division back, the front trench being subjected to continuous artillery fire. The British also made several smaller attacks to secure a better 'jumping-off' line for the next major attack. In one of these on 12 September C Company and a platoon of A Company of 10th SWB was sent against 'Africa Trench' in conjunction with an attack by the New Zealand Division. The trench was strongly held, and two attempts failed to get into it, the SWB being withdrawn to their own trench after dark. After three uneventful days, 115th Brigade withdrew into divisional reserve for the attack on 18 September (the Battle of Épehy). Although the attack was only partially successful the brigade moved up to a line of captured trenches practically without loss, and 10th SWB formed a defensive flank that night. 38th (W) Division was relieved on 20/21 September.

The Allies launched a concerted series of offensives all along the Western Front at the end of September, including Fourth Army's crossing of the St Quentin Canal on 28 September. For this operation 38th (W) Division was brought forward and occupied old trenches at 2 hours' notice to join in the attacks, although it was not called upon. By 3 October Fourth Army had made such good progress that the division had to change position to remain in supporting distance. This entailed a flank march over open ground, part of which was under enemy observation and under continuous bombardment with high explosive and mustard gas. However, on 4 October 115th Bde reached Bony and that night it carried out a complex relief of 50th (Northumbrian) Division. The Germans had fallen back to the Beaurevoir Line, which was strongly entrenched and wired. The division spent two days bringing up artillery and pushing forward to gain a good jumping off line from which to assault the Beaurevoir Line. For example, on 5 October 115th Bde advanced with 10th SWB on the right and 17th RWF on the left. They exploited to the north with strong battle patrols, and then wheeled east. 10th SWB met no resistance until a point 300 yards (270 m) south-east of Aubencheul, where the enemy made a stand with artillery and machine guns, so the battalion halted and consolidated the ground it had gained. During the night 17th RWF captured Aubencheul, so 10th SWB was able to push forward again in the morning, patrols going as far the Beaurevoir line, which they could not penetrate.

The plan for the attack on 8 October (part of the Second Battle of Cambrai) called on 38th (W) Division to make an advance of over 5,000 yards (4,600 m) through very strong positions. 10th SWB's patrols reported the barbed wire thicker than they had ever seen before. Major Bowen was ordered to shift the battalion to the right so that it could jump off from a portion of the Beaurevoir line that was already in 50th (N) Division's hands, thereby avoiding the wire, it was hoped. The battalion got tangled up with troops of 50th (N) Division undergoing relief, and only got into position just before Zero hour. Although Zero for the main attack was to be at 04.30 on 8 October, 115th Bde's attack began at 01.00 with 10th SWB and 17th RWF each advancing behind its own barrage south and north respectively of the village of Villers-Outréaux; 2nd RWF with two tanks would then mop up the village at daybreak. 10th SWB's attack led by A and B Companies immediately ran into unseen wire and machine gun fire and was held up. The battalion had to reorganise before it could make a second attempt. Meanwhile Company Sergeant Major Jack Williams of B Company identified an enemy machine gun post that was holding his men up. Ordering a Lewis gun to engage the post, he and Private Evans went forward and captured the post's garrison of 11 men. Williams was awarded the Victoria Cross (VC) for this action, and Evans the Distinguished Conduct Medal (DCM). By dawn 10th SWB and 17th RWF were reorganised, and 2nd RWF had arrived with the tanks and an artillery observer. The renewed attack broke into the line and began rolling it up, so that at 11.30 114th Bde could pass through to take up the attack. The enemy broke, and 38th (W) Division reached its objectives, 10th SWB digging in for the night. Then while 113rd and 114th Bdes held the new front line and support positions, 115th Bde went into billets for three days in the largely undamaged village of Villers-Outréaux – the first habitable buildings the troops had seen since 4 August, and the first liberated civilians they had met. 10th SWB had suffered casualties of 10 officers and 200 ORs killed and wounded.

=== Selle & Sambre ===
Over the next few days 38th (W) Division followed and supported 33rd Division's advance. 115th Brigade relieved 33rd Division on the night of 13/14 October, facing the enemy across the River Selle. Several days were then spent preparing for an assault crossing (the Battle of the Selle), while 10th SWB held a couple of small bridgeheads over the river and patrolled forwards, locating the enemy's main position along a railway embankment north of the river. At one point on 18 October one of these patrols captured a quarry and prepared to hold it, but found it too likely to be cut off, so they later abandoned it. The battalion was relieved before 38th (W) Division made its attack with 113th and 114th Bdes on the night of 19/20 October. 33rd Division took up the pursuit thereafter, 115th Bde closely supporting its advance on 23 October. On 26 October 38th (W) Division returned to the front line at Englefontaine, facing the Forest of Mormal, where 10th SWB was ordered to entrench a line west of Englefontaine as the main line of resistance, while keeping one advance company available to seize ground where possible. On 4 November 38th (W) Division attacked as part of the larger Battle of the Sambre. 115th Brigade was to lead the division, jumping off at 06.15 to advance on a wide frontage (2,000 yards (1,800 m)) through strongly-fenced orchards and then the trees of the forest. The brigade had all three battalions in line, with 10th SWB in the centre. Each battalion was to be accompanied by a tank from C Company, G Battalion, Tank Corps, but in practice only two tanks arrived, and both of these advanced with 10th SWB. At Zero there was a dense fog. Strong wire-cutters had been supplied to cut through the wired hedges, but the tanks broke most of these down. Reaching the forest they divided left and right, doing good work in silencing machine guns along the edge of the forest before one 'bellied' on a tree stump and the other broke down. The infantry attack was made in lines of small columns, each led by an officer with a compass, and these columns were often able to move between the enemy machine gun posts and mop them up from behind. After 115th Bde had penetrated 800 yards (730 m) into the forest (the Blue Line), the advance was to be taken up by the other brigades in turn. Against weak opposition 10th SWB reached the Blue Line within an hour at a cost of 42 casualties. By next morning the division had advanced 11 miles (18 km) – 4 miles (6.4 km) further than its neighbours – and had already overrun the first objective for 5 November. 115th Brigade and 10th SWB had made their last attack: over the following days 113th Bde and 33rd Division crossed the River Sambre and alternated in leading the pursuit until the morning of 11 November when the Armistice with Germany came into force, ending hostilities.

=== Post-Armistice ===
38th (W) Division concentrated round Aulnoye, where demobilisation began in December, with critical workers (many miners in the case of 38th (W) Division) being released first. The division began withdrawing from the Aulnoye area on 27 December and by 14 January 1919 it had settled into billets to the east of Amiens. Demobilisation continued, and during February about 125 more recently enlisted men were drafted to the 1st and 2nd SWB in the Army of Occupation on the Rhine. By the end of the month the battalion was down to a strength of less than 100 all ranks. The remaining cadre of the battalion, under Lt-Col Harvey once more, embarked at Le Havre for Southampton in May and was disbanded in Western Command on 3 July 1919. The battalion had suffered a total of 455 men killed during its service.

== Insignia ==
The divisional insignia of 38th (Welsh) Division.

38th (Welsh) Division adopted a scheme of coloured cloth geometric shapes worn on the upper arms to distinguish its brigades and units. 115th Brigade used an upright rectangle, which in the case of the 10th SWB was green. However, the two SWB battalions added an embroidered tower to their patch; in the 10th SWB this was red. After 38th (W) Division adopted the Red dragon of Wales on a black cloth rectangle as a divisional sign during 1917, this was worn on the right arm and the brigade/battalion flash was worn on the left arm only.

== Commanders ==
The following officers commanded 10th SWB:

- Lt-Col Sir Hamar Greenwood, MP, 10 December 1914 to 24 April 1916
- Lt-Col J.S. Wilkinson, DSO, West Yorkshire Regiment, from 19th Welch 25 April 1916, died of wounds 7 July 1916
- Lt-Col C.D. Harvey, Sherwood Foresters, promoted from second-in-command 7 July 1916; wounded 9 June 1918; returned after Armistice
- Lt-Col A.L. Bowen (temporary) from 9 June 1918
- Maj Sykes (acting) to Armistice

== Memorials ==
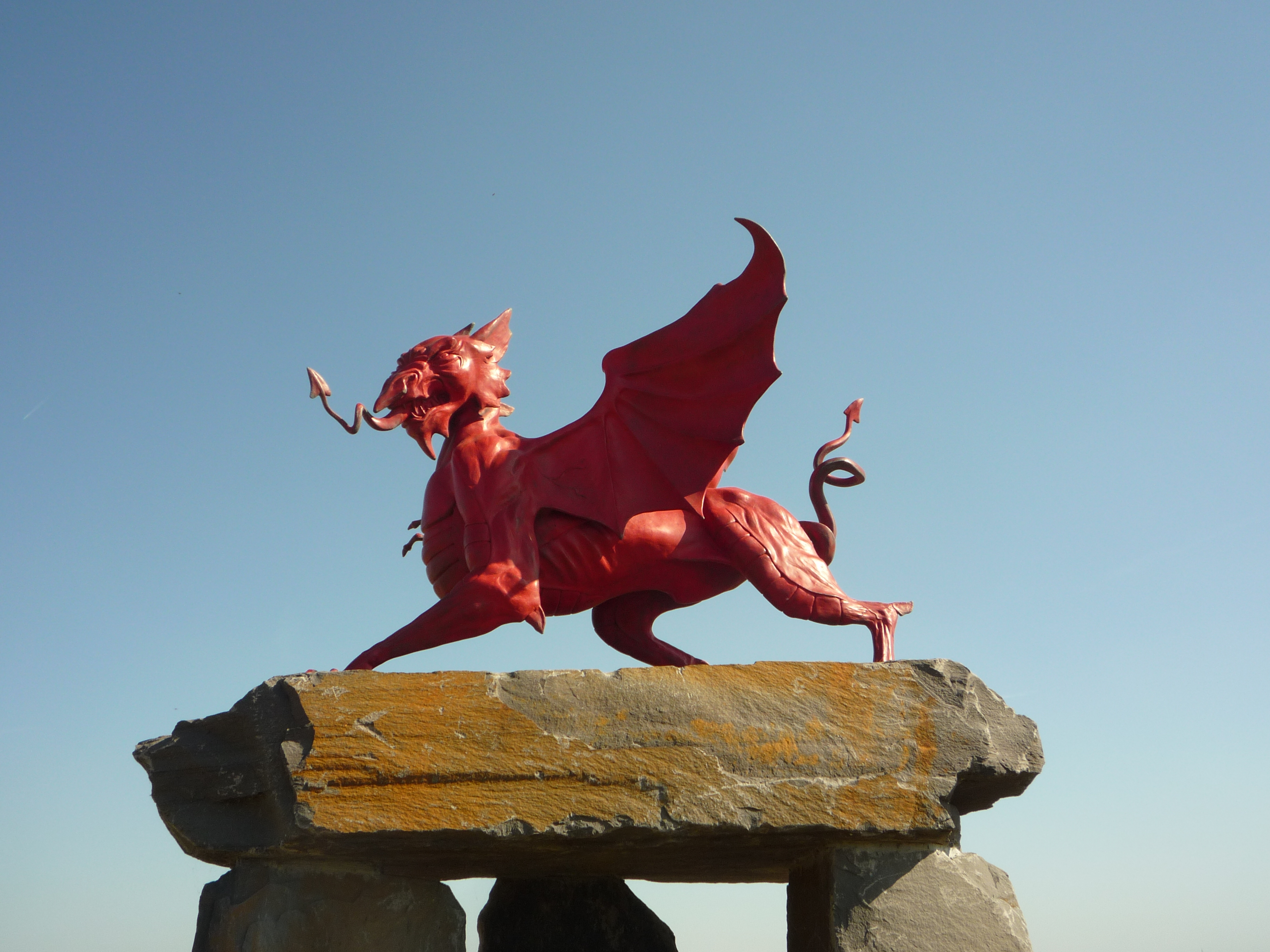
The Red Dragon of Wales atop the Cromlech of stones at the Welsh Memorial Park, Ypres.

Red dragon sculptures commemorating the service of the 38th (Welsh) Division have been erected at the Mametz Wood Memorial and at Welsh Memorial Park, Ypres, on Pilckem Ridge.

The Harvard Memorial Chapel in Brecon Cathedral contains the South Wales Borderers' memorial to the dead of World War I.

The people of Villers-Outréaux credited CSM Jack Williams and 10th SWB with saving their village from destruction in 1918. A century later they dedicated a war memorial to him. In 2019 a new bridge on the A465 'Heads of the Valleys Road' was named the 'Jack Williams Gateway Bridge'. A Blue plaque to CSM Williams was installed in his home town of Ebbw Vale in 2014.
