= 11th (Service) Battalion, South Wales Borderers (2nd Gwent) =

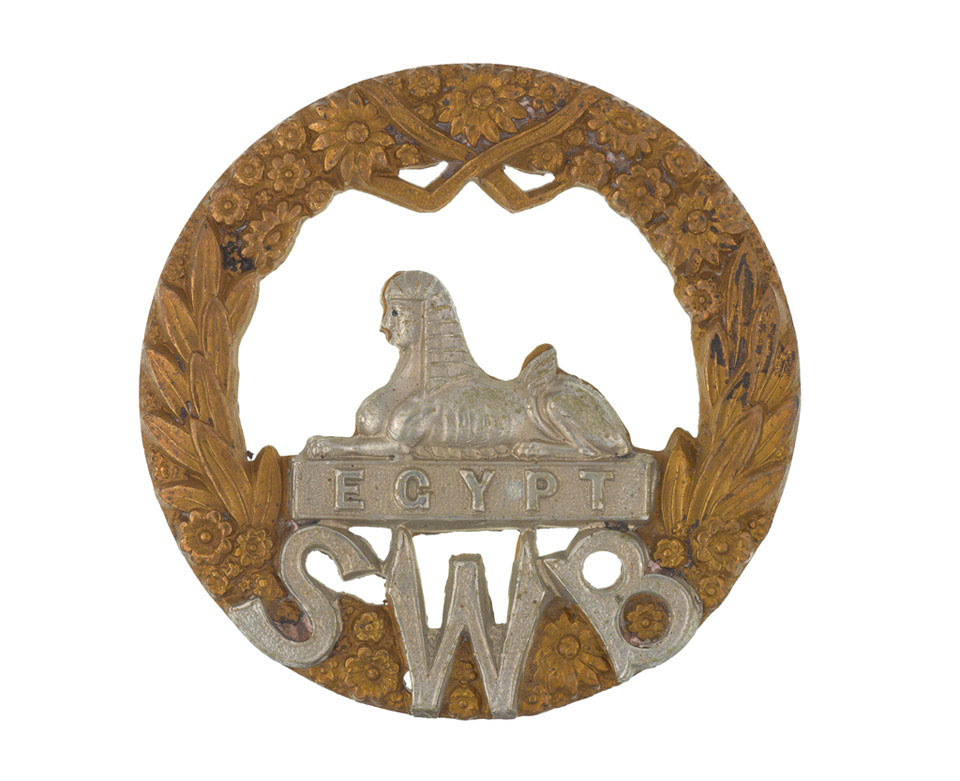
- c. 1896 cap badge of the South Wales Borderers
- Active: 5 December 1914–27 February 1918
- Allegiance: United Kingdom
- Branch: New Army
- Type: Pals battalion
- Role: Infantry
- Size: One Battalion
- Part of: 38th (Welsh) Division
- Garrison/HQ: Brecon
- Patron: Welsh National Executive Committee
- Engagements: Battle of the Somme; Third Battle of Ypres

The 2nd Gwent Battalion was a Welsh 'Pals battalion' formed as part of 'Kitchener's Army' during World War I. Raised by local initiative in Monmouthshire and Brecknockshire, it became the 11th (Service) Battalion of the local regiment, the South Wales Borderers ('11th SWB'). It served in 38th (Welsh) Division and led the division's costly attack on Mametz Wood during the Battle of the Somme. The battalion continued to serve on the Western Front, including the Third Battle of Ypres. It was disbanded early in 1918, but many of its personnel remained together for a few weeks in a composite battalion that saw action at the Battle of Estaires in April 1918.

== Recruitment ==
Alfred Leete's recruitment poster for Kitchener's Army.

On 6 August 1914, less than 48 hours after Britain's declaration of war, Parliament sanctioned an increase of 500,000 men for the Regular British Army, and the newly appointed Secretary of State for War, Earl Kitchener of Khartoum issued his famous call to arms: 'Your King and Country Need You', urging the first 100,000 volunteers to come forward to form the 1st New Army ('K1'). A flood of volunteers poured into the recruiting offices across the country and were formed into 'Service' battalions of the county regiments and the 'first hundred thousand' were enlisted within days. This group of six divisions with supporting arms became known as Kitchener's First New Army, or 'K1'. K2, K3 and K4 followed shortly afterwards.

However, these were soon joined by groups of men from particular localities or backgrounds who wished to serve together. Starting from London and Liverpool, the phenomenon of 'Pals battalions' quickly spread across the country, as local recruiting committees offered complete units to the War Office (WO). One such organisation was the 'Welsh National Executive Committee' (WNEC). On 28 September 1914 David Lloyd George addressed a meeting of representatives from all over Wales, at which the committee was formed to seek permission to form a complete Welsh Army Corps of two divisions. The WO accepted the WNEC's proposal on 10 October and enrolment began. The '1st Gwent' battalion began recruiting in November at Brecon, the regimental depot of the South Wales Borderers (SWB), and the 2nd Gwent on 5 December, when Major Herbert Porter, a retired officer of the Indian Army, was appointed as commanding officer (CO) of the 2nd Gwent with the rank of Lieutenant-Colonel. (Note: There was some confusion in the titles: the London Gazette initially referred to the 10th and 11th SWB as the '1st Monmouth' and '2nd Monmouth' respectively.) By then the SWB had already raised six service battalions for K1–K4, and volunteers were becoming harder to obtain. When the 2nd Gwent, now the 11th (Service) Battalion, SWB, moved to Old Colwyn on 9 January 1915 it was still only 100 strong. Recruiting continued in Monmouthshire and Brecknockshire, and particularly at Pengam, and it began to pick up, 180 men coming in on 19 January, allowing B Company to be formed. The battalion also obtained 100 Welsh recruits from Liverpool.

== Training ==
The rush of Kitchener recruits had overwhelmed the Army's ability to absorb them, so the Pals Battalions of the Fifth New Army, 'K5' were left for some time in the hands of the recruiting committees. Until khaki cloth could be supplied, most of the men recruited by the WNEC were clothed in the grey Welsh cloth known as Brethyn Llwyd. At Old Colwyn the 11th SWB joined 130th (3rd Welsh) Brigade of 43rd Division (1st Division, Welsh Army Corps), serving alongside 17th (S) Bn, Royal Welsh Fusiliers (2nd North Welsh) (17th RWF), 10th (S) Bn, SWB (1st Gwent), and 16th (S) Bn, Welsh Regiment (Cardiff City). In April 1915 the Fourth New Army (K4) was converted into reserve units for K1–K3, and the K5 formations took over their numbers: thus 130th Bde became 115th Bde in 38th (Welsh) Division on 29 April; at the same time the over-ambitious plan for a complete Welsh Army Corps was abandoned. By now the 11th SWB had completed its fourth company and had obtained a number of former Regular Army men to serve as warrant officers. Battalion training and selection of specialists such as signallers was proceeding well. But with units scattered across North Wales there was no opportunity for divisional training. However, in the summer the division began to concentrate around Winchester, with 11th SWB joining at Hazeley Down in August. The division trained for open warfare on the Hampshire downland, leaving trench warfare to be learned when the troops reached the Western Front. It was not until November that enough rifles arrived for all the men to undertake their musketry course.

38th (W) Division was now warned for service on the Western Front. Lt-Col Porter was not fit for overseas service and was transferred to command the 14th (Reserve) Bn SWB. He was replaced as CO by Major J.R. Gaussen, from 3rd Skinner's Horse of the Indian Army. On 3 December 11 SWB left Hazeley Down for Southampton and crossed to Le Havre that night, landing the following day. It then went by train to join the divisional concentration at Aire on 6 December and marched to its training area at Witternesse.

=== 13th (Reserve) Battalion ===
In July 1915 the depot ('E') companies of the 10th and 11th SWB moved to Coed Coch Camp near St Asaph to form 13th (Reserve) Battalion, SWB, as a local reserve battalion with the role of training reinforcements for the two service battalions. It was commanded by Lt-Col W.H. Pitten, previously second-in-command of 10th SWB. In September it moved to Kinmel Park Camp near Rhyl, where it joined 13th Reserve Brigade. It sent its first drafts overseas to the 10th and 11th SWB in January 1916 and continued to do so regularly, such that it did not complete its own fourth company until June, when the Derby Scheme brought in a surge in recruits. Previously, many of the recruits sent to the battalion were classed as labourers and were transferred to works battalions of the King's (Liverpool Regiment) and the Cheshire Regiment or to munitions work, 13th SWB forming its own Works Company to handle them. In May Lt-Col Pitten was replaced by Lt-Col J.A.F. Field from the Cheshire Regiment. On 1 September 1916 the Local Reserve battalions were transferred to the Training Reserve (TR) and 13th (R) Bn SWB became 59th Training Reserve Battalion, though the training staff retained their SWB cap badges. On 4 July 1917 it was redesignated 213th (Infantry) Battalion, TR, and on 1 November it was transferred to become 51st (Graduated ) Battalion, Cheshire Regiment in 194th (2/1st South Scottish) Brigade of 65th (2nd Lowland) Division at Curragh Camp in Ireland. It remained at the Curragh when 65th Division was disbanded in March 1918. After the Armistice with Germany it was converted into a service battalion on 6 February 1919 and was then absorbed into 1/4th Bn, Cheshire Regiment, on 28 March 1919.

== Service ==
After two weeks at Witternesse, 11th SWB was ordered up with the rest of 38th (W) Division to Saint-Venant, where it was in reserve for XI Corps. 11th SWB was attached to 57th Bde of 19th (Western) Division for its introduction to the front line. From mid-January 1916 the battalion began a long sequence of tours of duty in the trenches between the La Bassée Canal and Fouquissart, at Festubert in February and March, or at Givenchy in April, alternating with spells in brigade or divisional reserve. The Festubert area was badly flooded and the line consisted of detached posts or 'islands', while Givenchy was more dangerous because the drier ground made mine warfare possible, and the enemy could fire a mine at any time. During this spell Lt-Col Gaussen acted as brigade commander. In May the battalion was in the Moated Grange sector just north of Neuve-Chapelle, where patrol actions in No man's land were common. During this period of trench warfare, 11th SWB's casualties amounted to 1 officer and 9 other ranks (ORs) killed, 6 officers and 87 ORs wounded.

At this time the British Expeditionary Force (BEF) was preparing for that summer's 'Big Push' on the Western Front (the Battle of the Somme). In June 38 (W) Division was withdrawn from the line and sent to a training area around Tincques and Villers-Brûlin. At the end of the month it began a long and tiring march south and on 3 July it arrived at Buire-sur-l'Ancre in XVII Corps' reserve.

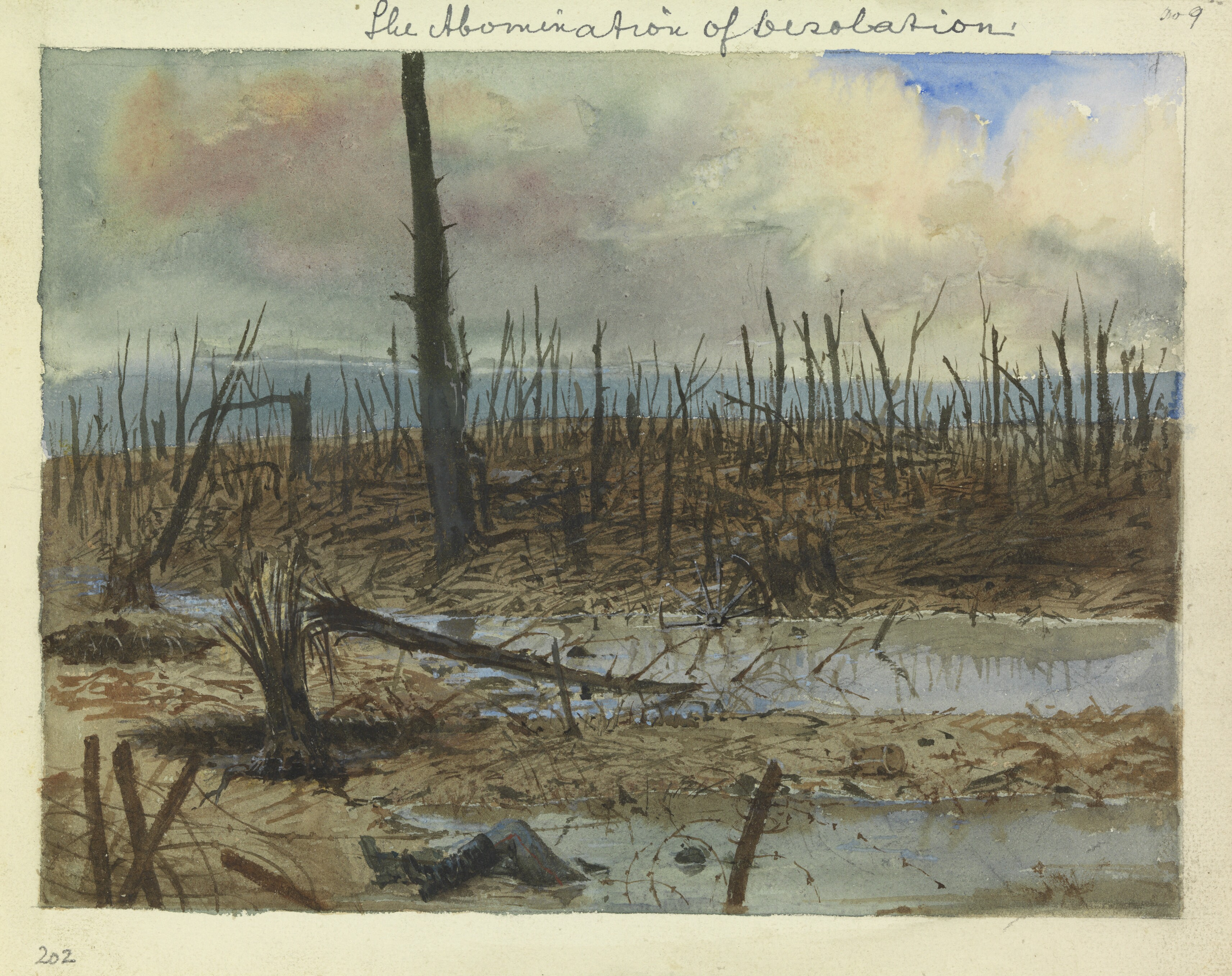
The Abomination of Desolation, sketch by J.B. Morrall of Mametz Wood after the 1916 fighting.

=== Mametz Wood ===
The Somme Offensive had begun on 1 July with a disastrous attack across a wide front. 38th (W) Division had been warned to accompany the cavalry in exploiting a breakthrough towards Bapaume. There was no breakthrough: instead the division was switched to the Mametz sector, where there had been some success. On 5 July it took over the front line and prepared to capture Mametz Wood. The initial attack on the south-east corner, the 'Hammerhead', was assigned to 115th Bde, which was to advance on 7 July across the valley on a frontage of two battalions, with 11th SWB on the left starting from Caterpillar Wood and Marlborough Copse and 16th Welsh on the right from the ridge above the valley. A French artillery groupe bombarded Mametz Wood with gas shell at 05.30, followed by the main British artillery bombardment at 08.00. The infantry advanced at 08.30. It was too windy to fire a smokescreen, but the brigade machine guns and trench mortars supported the movement. However, the troops ran into machine gun fire not only from the Hammerhead in front, but also in enfilade from two small woods, Flatiron Copse and Sabot Copse, further up the valley to the right, which should have been screened by smoke. After the initial attack was held up, two further attempts were made at 11.15 and 15.15 after fresh artillery bombardments and supported by 10th SWB. None of the infantry could get within 200 yards (180 m) of the Hammerhead, and were lying out in the valley under fire, tired out and wet through from the rain. 115th Brigade was not reorganised in time to take part in another attack by the neighbouring division at 20.00, and it was eventually ordered to withdraw to bivouacs. 11th SWB had suffered casualties of 13 officers and 177 ORs.

Early on 10 July Mametz Wood was attacked with the full weight of 38th (W) Division, 113th and 114th Bdes leading, with 115th Bde in reserve. The attack made progress into the wood from the south, but bogged down in the Hammerhead, where the Germans counter-attacked. 10th SWB and 17th RWF from 115th Bde were then committed to the fighting, and by the end of the day the southern half of Mametz Wood was in the division's hands, with 10th SWB holding most of the Hammerhead. During the night 115th Bde took over control of the fighting and two companies of 11th SWB were brought into the line between 17th RWF and 10th SWB (the other two remaining to hold Caterpillar Wood and Marlborough Copse). Brigadier-General H.J. Evans of 115th Bde made a personal reconnaissance of the wood, accompanied by Lt-Col Gaussen and a party of bayonet men from 11th SWB. They got lost and were at the northern end of the wood close to the Germans when the British artillery opened up, wounding Evans and his Brigade major and killing 8 of Gaussen's 11 bayonet men. Evans continued his reconnaissance and strengthened and consolidated the front line. At 11.40 next morning he was ordered to make a new attack to take the rest of the wood. Deciding that he could not organise a formal attack with artillery support, he decided to launch a surprise attack at 15.00 with the bayonet. Just 15 minutes before the attack, an unexpected British artillery barrage on the north of the wood caused numerous casualties and disorganisation among the troops waiting to attack, and was followed by a German counter-barrage. The attack was finally made at 15.30 after the artillery stopped. Two companies of 11th SWB went forward, leaving the other two in the Hammerhead, but progress through the fallen trees and undergrowth was very slow. Brigadier-Gen Evans was wounded again and on his own initiative, Lt-Col Gaussen collected detachments of 10th SWB (who had lost their CO) to reinforce his battalion. Eventually A Company of 11th SWB fought its way through to the north eastern corner of Mametz Wood, followed a little later by B Company on its left, which reached the northern edge and dug in about 75 yards (69 m) from the German trench at 'Middle Alley'. However, 17th RWF and 16th Welsh further left could not quite reach the edge of the wood, leaving 11th SWB's flank exposed. With his men exhausted and under constant bombardment, Gaussen reluctantly withdrew his men from the edge into the interior of the wood. 11th SWB's total casualties in Mametz Wood had risen to 36 killed and many more listed as missing (mostly dead) and over 150 wounded. 38th (W) Division was relieved that night.

Two days after being relieved, 11th SWB was back in the line in the Somme sector, albeit at Hébuterne where the fighting had died down after 1 July. As the Somme battles continued, 11th SWB actively patrolled in front of this line. At the end of July it moved to the Ypres Salient, where it held trenches facing Pilckem Ridge, spending the time improving the trenches and carrying out raids. Casualties were light in late 1916, but the drain on resources on the Somme front meant that the battalions in the Salient received few reinforcements, and remained considerably understrength. In January 1917 the 11th SWB did receive a 100-strong draft of Bantams: originally the Bantam battalions (including the 12th SWB (3rd Gwent)) had been composed of physically fit men who did not meet the army's normal minimum height. However, by the end of 1916 most of the undersized recruits were not fit for front line service and the Bantam concept was being dropped. Early in 1917 the casualty rate from enemy shelling increased, the 11th SWB losing 13 killed and 25 wounded in February alone. That month Lt-Col Gaussen was recalled to India and replaced as CO by Lt-Col Alfred Radice from the Gloucestershire Regiment.

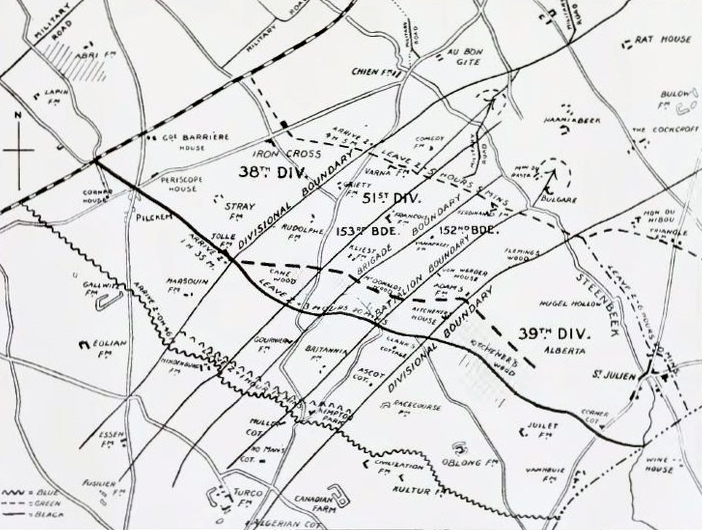
38th (W) Division's attack at Pilckem Ridge, 31 July 1917.

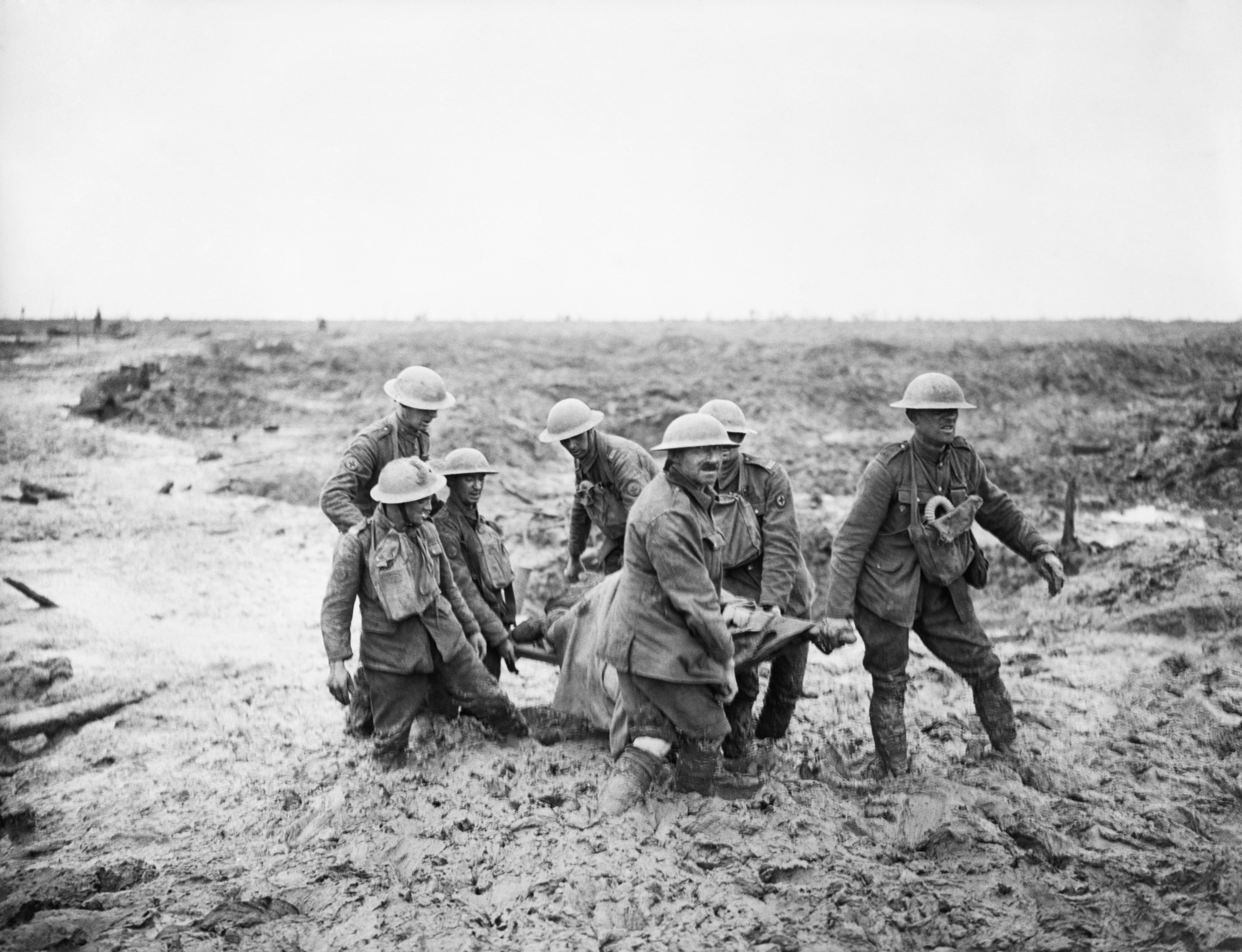
Stretcher-bearers struggle through the mud after the Battle of Pilckem Ridge, 1 August 1917 (Photograph by John Warwick Brooke).

=== Pilckem Ridge ===
In May 1917 38th (W) Division was warned that the British would launch an offensive on the division 's front during the summer, and it began preparations, including digging assembly trenches. In June it was given its role in the forthcoming operation, and towards the end of the month was taken out of the line and went to the St Hilaire area to train for the attack over replica trenches and strongpoints. Reinforcements also arrived, the 11th SWB receiving a draft of 136 men; from a strength of only 632 ORs at the beginning of the month, it had risen to 744 by 1 July, with 25 officers. On 16 July it began its return march to the front, and by 20 July 38th (W) Division. was back in the line. The battalions were constantly called on for working parties to complete preparations for the much-delayed Ypres Offensive, and German artillery was active over both the front and rear areas attempting to disrupt the preparations with high explosive and the new Mustard gas.

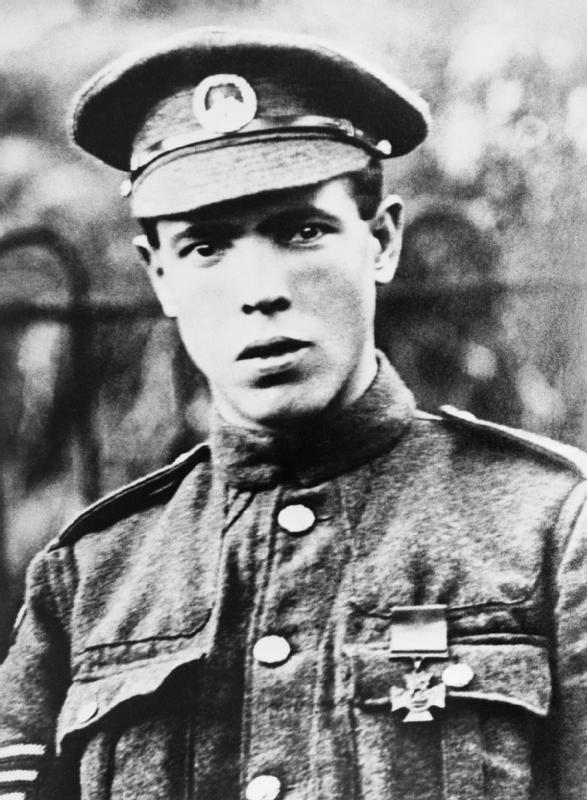
Sergeant Ivor Rees, who won the VC at Pilckem.

The opening of the offensive was finally fixed for 31 July. 11th SWB marched up to the Corps concentration area on 29 July and started for the assembly position soon after dark the following night. Although it was late getting into position, the men still had an hour to spare before Zero at 03.50. The plan was for 113th and 114th Bdes to advance up the ridge and capture the first three objectives (the Blue, Black and Green Lines), including the fortified Pilckem village and the pillbox at 'Iron Cross' crossroads. Then two battalions of 115th Bde (11th SWB on the right and 17th RWF on the left) were to pass through and descend from Iron Cross Ridge to capture the line of the Steenbeek stream (the Green Dotted Line). After leaving the usual 'battle reserve' (including a new draft) and other detachments, the battalion attacked with 18 officers and 509 ORs. Although they suffered heavy casualties, the leading brigades took their objectives, and even though it was left behind by the creeping barrage, 11th SWB still reached the stream in good time, at 09.53, despite casualties from enfilade fire where the division on the right was held up. There were numerous pillboxes and strongpoints in the ruins of houses, but the pre-battle training had paid particular attention to this tactical problem and the battalion successfully cleared them. Sergeant Ivor Rees with his platoon worked round one of the machine gun posts and rushed it. He then bombed a strongly-held concrete shelter, taking 30 prisoners and another machine gun. For this action he was awarded the Victoria Cross (VC). About 12.30 A and C Companies were across the stream and captured a strongly held pillbox in the ruins of the Au Bon Gîte inn, together with two adjacent strongpoints. D Company also established a small bridgehead. The battalion had taken serious casualties, however, including Lt-Col Radice wounded (Captain B.E.S. Davies took over command), and D Company of 10th SWB was sent forward to reinforce it while it consolidated its position. About 15.10 two waves of German counter-attackers came down from Langemarck. Although the telephone lines had been cut by artillery fire, and 11th SWB was unable to call down its 'SOS' barrage, it held off the attack with its rifles and Lewis guns. The company holding Au Bon Gîte caused huge casualties to the two German battalions that attacked 11th SWB's positions. The Germans had to call in the help of heavy artillery before they could assault the pillbox, assisted by enfilade fire from the left, where 17th RWF had been forced back across the Steenbeek. Eventually, about 17.00 the company at Au Bon Gîte was forced to withdraw across the stream, but D Company of 10th SWB had now arrived to thicken up the firing line. The next counter-attack made slow progress in the face of a defensive artillery and machine gun barrage, and rifle fire from the battalion's line along the stream accounted for Germans who got through the barrage. They eventually dug in about 100 yards (91 m) from the Steenbeek. During the afternoon it had begun to rain, and the positions in the Steenbeek valley became very muddy, hindering all further movement. Next day Capt Davies was killed while carrying out a reconnaissance to see if Au Bon Gîte could be recovered; the Brigade Major who accompanied him decided that 11th SWB was too weak to make the attempt and cancelled the orders. The rest of 10th SWB was sent forward to strengthen the line, but although the Germans shelled the line heavily, they did not try to attack through the mud. The men of 10th and 11th SWB withdrew 200 yards (180 m) to shelter from the bombardment in shellholes, but reoccupied the line along the Steenbeek afterwards. 115th Brigade was relieved from the front line on the night of 1/2 August, though it took until 4 August to gather the scattered survivors of 11th SWB along the Steenbeek. It was now under the temporary command of Capt W.T. Harris. The battalion had lost 4 officers and 116 ORs killed or missing, 10 officers and 222 ORs wounded. The whole division went back to Proven on 6 August, when Maj James Angus from 16th Welch took command of 11th SWB, and the battalion received a draft of 136 ORs.

=== Ypres ===
38th (W) Division returned to the line after the Battle of Langemarck, when that village was captured. 115th Brigade was in reserve, between Pilckem and the Yser Canal, working on defences and road repair under harassing shellfire: on 19 August one of 11th SWB's working parties was hit, losing 20 men. On 22 August the battalion went into the front line, with battalion HQ at Alouette Farm, near Langemarck, and B and D Companies in 'White Trench' east of the village. The north-west continuation of this trench, 'Eagle Trench' was still in German hands, but on the night of 24/25 August a patrol from 11th SWB found it damaged and unoccupied except by many dead, victims of a British bombardment earlier in the day. On 27 August 16th Welch attempted to take this trench but in the mud were unable to keep up with the barrage and were hit by enfilade fire from the 'White House' strongpoint. Nevertheless, a platoon of 11th SWB, sent up to maintain contact with the division attacking on the right, managed to capture White House. After 16th Welch's failure, 11th SWB came under heavy shellfire and had to be reinforced by 10th SWB, but held on to White House, the only success of the day. The battalion maintained its position until it was relieved and went into reserve at 'Leipzig Farm' on 29 August, having suffered 20 killed and 40 wounded. In the first week of September its working parties were in the area of Iron Cross Ridge and suffered a few more casualties, but it did not return to the front line. After 38th (W) Division was relieved on 11 September it left the Ypres Salient and moved south to the Armentières sector.

Although Armentières and the Lys Valley was considered a quiet sector, the division had a wide front to hold with weak battalions, and the Germans were energetic raiders. The 11th SWB in turn was active in patrolling, with numerous small actions. Lieutenant-Col Angus drowned while swimming in the Lys on 17 September, and was succeeded in command by Maj Joseph Partridge of the Welch Regiment, who left in October to join 10th Welch. Major T.H. Morgan who had recently rejoined the battalion was then promoted to the command. During the winter 38th (W) Division helped to train troops of the 1st Portuguese Division. Then in mid-January 1918 38th (W) Division was withdrawn for an extended rest.

=== Disbandment ===
By early 1918 the BEF was suffering a manpower crisis. Brigades had to be reduced from four to three battalions, and the surplus war-formed battalions were broken up to provide reinforcements for others. One battalion from each of 38th (W) Division's brigades was disbanded, and the surplus personnel formed 1st Entrenching Battalion. However, the Regular Army 2nd RWF was also posted to 115th Bde from 33rd Division on 6 February, and to make room for it 11th SWB left the brigade on 12 February. At first it was designated a Reserve battalion, and transferred a draft of 150 men to 10th SWB on 16 February. Then 11th (Service) Battalion, South Wales Borderers (2nd Gwent) was disbanded on 27 February, and the remaining men – about 750 – drafted to 2nd Entrenching Battalion.

=== 2nd Entrenching Battalion ===
There had been a previous 2nd Entrenching Battalion in 1915, formed to make use of troops in reinforcement camps while they were awaiting posting to their battalions. In February 1918 a large number of such battalions were formed from the 'residues' of the recently disbanded battalions. The reformed 2nd Bn was based on the battalion HQ, transport, signallers, and other specialists from 7th (S) Bn, East Surrey Regiment from 12th (Eastern) Division. There were also small contingents from 8th (S) Bn, Royal Fusiliers, and 11th (S) Bn, Middlesex Regiment, from 12th (E) Division, and 2/5th Bn, King's (Liverpool Regiment), and 2/5th Bn, South Lancashire Regiment, from 57th (2nd West Lancashire) Division. By far the largest contingent, however, was supplied by 11th SWB. The battalion was under the command of Lt-Col L.D. Scott of the 7th East Surreys, with Maj J.H.T. Monteith of 11th SWB as second-in-command.

The battalion was part of the First Army Group of Entrenching Battalions and was assigned to XV Corps Troops for labour duties under the direction of the Royal Engineers (REs). In addition the battalion fulfilled its draft-finding role, particularly for units that had been heavily engaged in the German spring offensive that started on 21 March. By the end of the month 90 ORs of the 2/5th South Lancashires had joined 1/5th Bn of their regiment, and the East Surrey and Middlesex ORs had been drafted to the 22nd Bn Northumberland Fusiliers (3rd Tyneside Scottish). On 4–5 April a draft of 200 SWBs went to the 5th SWB (Pioneers) in 19th (Western) Division and most of the SWB officers were posted to Regular battalions of the regiment, but other officers joined the battalion from 57th (2nd WL) Division and from 3rd Entrenching Bn, which was being broken up. Many of these surplus officers were posted to an officers' school being set up at Thiennes by 2nd Bn under Maj Monteith.

The second phase of the German spring offensive (the Battle of Lys) burst on First Army's front on 9 April. Army HQ had ordered that in the event of action developing, the entrenching battalions were to be withdrawn to reinforcement camps and not risked in fighting. But when the enemy looked like breaking through at the Battle of Estaires on 11 April, Major-General Henry Jackson of 50th (Northumbrian) Division gathered all the rear-area troops he could find to defend the bridgeheads over the Lys at Merville. Among these scratch forces was 'XV Corps Composite Battalion' under Lt-Col Scott consisting of the available men of his 2nd Entrenching Bn (17 officers and 374 ORs) and the XV Corps School (13 officers and 150 ORs). Meanwhile, Maj Monteith with a SWB detachment of 2nd Entrenching Bn was on detached duty at Locon. While most of the composite battalion lined the railway bank east of Merville, Scott sent 2nd Lt Griffith and a party of 11th SWB to occupy an outpost position in some houses on the Locon road. During the day enemy pressure increased against this position, but the SWB inflicted many casualties, aided by some Lewis guns they took over from a group from 55th (West Lancashire) Division that had retreated through their position. Scott's battalion was aided by a company of 1/7th Bn, Durham Light Infantry (DLI) (50th (N) Division's pioneers), which had been digging trenches to defend the bridgeheads. When the enemy forced their way into the town Scott was ordered to withdraw to the north bank, but refused to do so until the order was confirmed in writing. The bridges were blown up by the REs and Scott's men crossed by a small footbridge that night and took up position along a canal west of Merville. Hearing that some of the DLI wounded had been left behind, Scott called for volunteers, and Griffith and about 20 of his men went back into the burning town to fetch them. On completion of the withdrawal the composite battalion was reinforced by dismounted Lewis gun teams from 4th Tank Brigade to continue the defence next day.

During the morning of 12 April the defenders concentrated their small arms fire to keep the enemy's heads down in the houses opposite, even when the Germans brought up a trench mortar. But the defenders had no artillery support, and the troops on both flanks were driven out. The composite battalion was driven back to Le Sart, where large numbers of stragglers from all units were collected, swamping the original personnel of Scott's battalion. That evening they were relieved by the arrival of fresh troops. In this action 2nd Entrenching Bn suffered serious casualties, totalling 13 officers and 168 ORs, of whom the great majority were from 11th SWB. A further 41 ORs from the detached party of the 11th SWB who had fought at Locon and been listed as 'missing' later returned, having attached themselves to 55th (WL) Division during the fighting. In common with the other entrenching battalions of First Army Group, 2nd Bn was ordered to be disbanded on 17 April. This was completed on 28 April, with the remaining personnel sent to XV Corps Reinforcement Camp at Linghem.

The historian of the South Wales Borderers regarded the defence of the Merville bridgeheads as 'the last fight of the 11th'.

== Insignia ==
The divisional insignia of 38th (Welsh) Division.

38th (Welsh) Division adopted a scheme of coloured cloth geometric shapes worn on the upper arms to distinguish its brigades and units. 115th Brigade used an upright rectangle, which in the case of the 11th SWB was dark blue. However, the two SWB battalions added an embroidered tower to their patch; in the 11th SWB this was light blue. After 38th (W) Division adopted the Red dragon of Wales on a black cloth rectangle as a divisional sign during 1917, this was worn on the right arm and the brigade/battalion flash was worn on the left arm only.

== Commanders ==
The following officers commanded 11th SWB during its service:

- Lt-Col J.R. Porter (Indian Army, retired), appointed 5 December 1914; posted to 14th (Reserve) Bn, SWB, November 1915
- Lt-Col J.R Gaussen (3rd Skinner's Horse, Indian Army), appointed 13 November 1915; recalled to India February 1917
- Lt-Col A.H. Radice (Gloucestershire Regiment), appointed March 1917, wounded 31 July 1917
- Lt-Col J.R. Angus (16th Welch Regiment), appointed 6 August 1917, accidentally drowned 17 September 1917
- Maj J.E.C. Partridge (Welch Regiment) September 1917; posted to 10th Welch in October 1917
- Maj T.H. Morgan, from October 1917 to disbandment

== Memorials ==
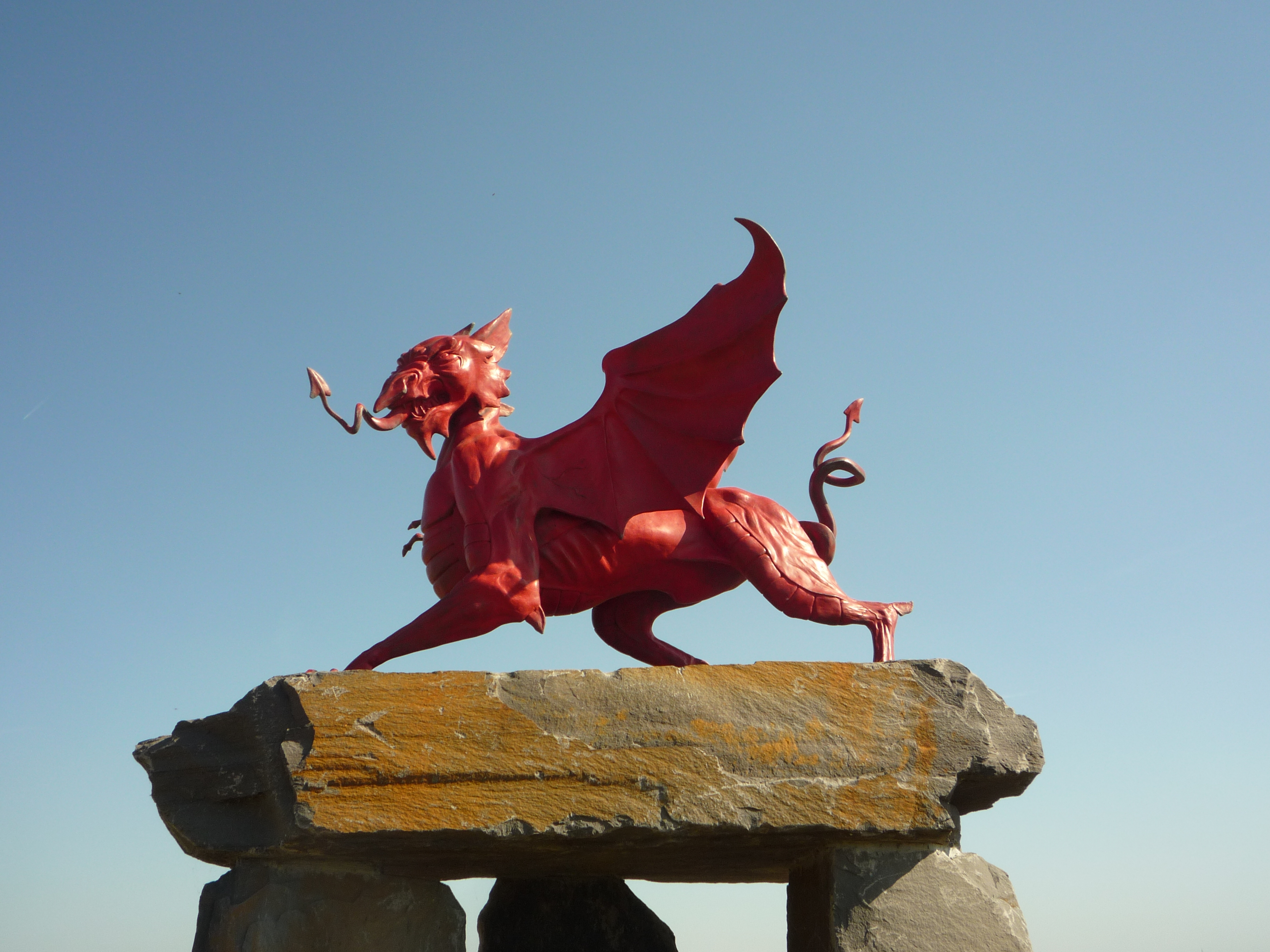
The Red Dragon of Wales atop the Cromlech of stones at the Welsh Memorial Park, Ypres.

Red dragon sculptures commemorating the service of the 38th (Welsh) Division have been erected at the Mametz Wood Memorial and Welsh Memorial Park, Ypres.

The Harvard Memorial Chapel in Brecon Cathedral contains the South Wales Borderers' memorial to the dead of World War I.

There is a Blue plaque to Sgt Ivor Rees, VC, at Llanelli Town Hall. His medal is held by the Regimental Museum of The Royal Welsh at Brecon.
