= Jack Williams (VC) =

Welsh recipient of the Victoria Cross (1886–1953)

John Henry Williams
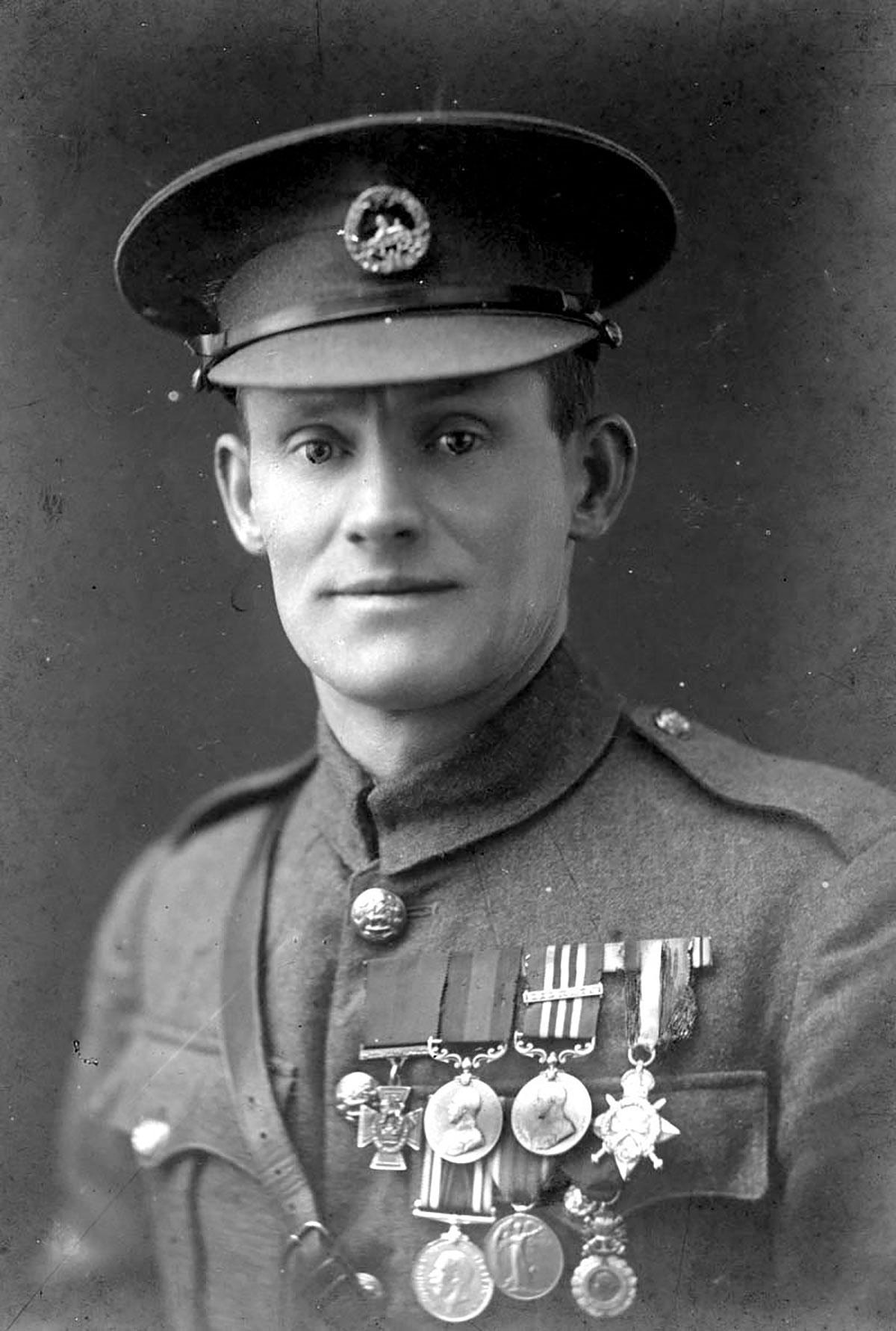
- Born: 29 September 1886; Nantyglo, Monmouthshire, Wales
- Died: 7 March 1953 (aged 66); Newport, Monmouthshire, Wales
- Burial place: Ebbw Vale Cemetery, Monmouthshire, Wales
- Military career
- Allegiance: United Kingdom
- Branch: British Army
- Service years: 1914–1918
- Rank: Company Sergeant Major
- Service number: 20408
- Units: South Wales Borderers
- Conflicts: First World War
- Awards: Victoria Cross; Distinguished Conduct Medal; Military Medal & Bar; Médaille Militaire (France)

Company Sergeant Major John Henry Williams, VC, DCM, MM & Bar (29 September 1886 – 7 March 1953) was a Welsh colliery worker, soldier, and a recipient of the Victoria Cross (VC) the highest award for gallantry in the face of the enemy that can be awarded to British and Commonwealth forces. Williams is the most decorated Welsh non-commissioned officer of all time.

== Early life ==
Williams was born in Nantyglo, Monmouthshire, on 29 September 1886.

== First World War ==
In November 1914, Williams gave up his employment as a colliery blacksmith and enlisted in the 10th (Service) Battalion, South Wales Borderers (1st Gwent) (part of the 38th (Welsh) Division). He was promoted to sergeant in January 1915.

His citation for the Victoria Cross reads:

For most conspicuous bravery, initiative and devotion to duty on the night of 7th – 8th October 1918, during the attack on Villers Outreaux, when, observing that his company was suffering heavy casualties from an enemy machine gun, he ordered a Lewis Gun to engage it, and went forward, under heavy fire, to the flank of the enemy post which he rushed single handed, capturing fifteen of the enemy. These prisoners, realising that Williams was alone, turned on him and one of them gripped his rifle. He succeeded in breaking away and bayonetting five enemy, whereupon the remainder again surrendered. By this gallant action and total disregard of personal danger, he was the means of enabling not only his own company but also those on the flanks to advance.

Company sergeant major Williams was medically discharged from the army on 17 October 1918 after being severely wounded by shrapnel in the right arm and leg.

In 1919, Williams was invested with his Victoria Cross, Distinguished Conduct Medal, Military Medal and Bar by King George V, the first time that the King had decorated the same man four times in one day. At the time of the investiture Williams had not recovered from his severe wounds, and during the presentation the wound in his arm opened up with the result that medical attention had to be given before he could leave the palace.

== Legacy ==
Williams' grave and memorial are at Ebbw Vale Cemetery. The original headstone was removed during cemetery clearance and a new headstone was erected on 21 October 1990.

In September 2018 the villagers of Villers-Outréaux dedicated an especially commissioned memorial to commemorate him and express their thanks for saving their village from certain destruction.

=== Bridge of Honour ===
The 'Jack Williams Gateway Bridge' was unveiled on 21 January 2019, by his great, great-granddaughter. It is 160 ft. tall, and is part of the new A465 ('Heads of Valleys') road dualling project between Brynmawr and Gilwern, on the westerly-part of the Clydach Gorge. It weighs just over 738 tons.

Mr Williams' name was chosen for the bridge by 96% of those who participated in the public vote.

=== War Medal ===
Williams' Victoria Cross is displayed at the Regimental Museum of The Royal Welsh, Brecon.
