= Villers-Outréaux =

- Commune
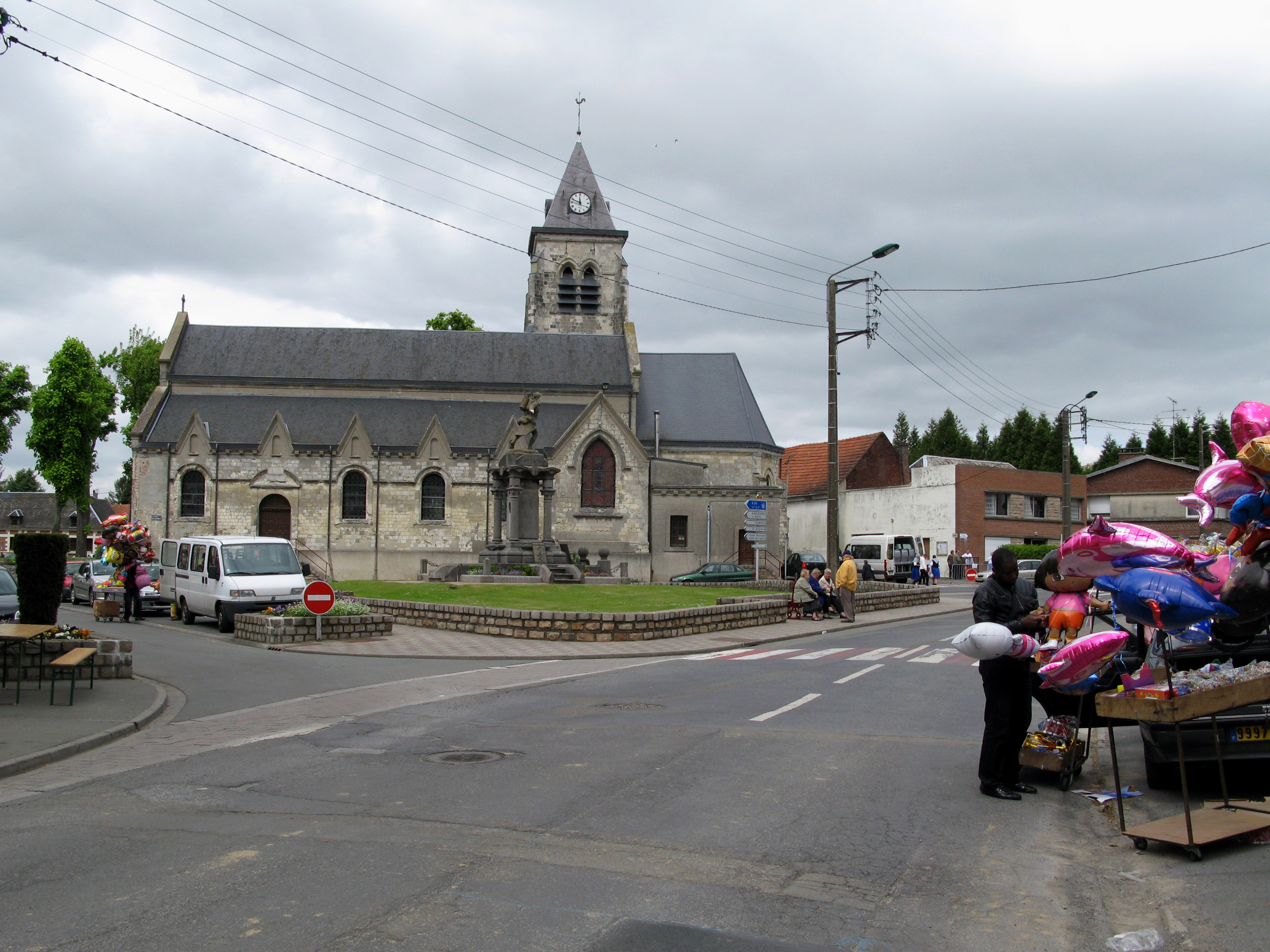
- The church in Villers-Outréaux

- Coat of arms
- Location of Villers-Outréaux
- Location within France Location within Hauts-de-France
- Coordinates: 50°02′03″N 3°18′04″E
- Country: France
- Region: Hauts-de-France
- Department: Nord
- Arrondissement: Cambrai
- Canton: Le Cateau-Cambrésis
- Intercommunality: CA Caudrésis–Catésis

Government
  - Mayor (2020–2026): Patrice Quévreux
- Area^{1}: 7.09 km^{2} (2.74 sq mi)
- Elevation: 135 m (443 ft)
- Highest elevation: 147 m (482 ft)
- Lowest elevation: 113 m (371 ft)
- Population (2023): 2,117
  - Density: 299/km^{2} (773/sq mi)
- Time zone: UTC+01:00 (CET)
  - Summer (DST): UTC+02:00 (CEST)
- INSEE/Postal code: 59624 /59142
- ^{1} French Land Register data, which excludes lakes, ponds, glaciers > 1 km^{2} (0.386 sq mi or 247 acres) and river estuaries.

Villers-Outréaux (French pronunciation: [vilɛʁ utʁeo]) is a commune in the Nord department in northern France.

== Population ==
Historical population
Year	Pop.	±% p.a.
1968	2,533	—
1975	2,714	+0.99%
1982	2,576	−0.74%
1990	2,421	−0.77%
1999	2,184	−1.14%
2007	2,165	−0.11%
2012	2,121	−0.41%
2017	2,110	−0.10%
2023	2,117	+0.06%
Source: INSEE

== Heraldry ==
Arms of Villers-Outréaux	The arms of Villers-Outréaux are blazoned : Gules, a cross indented Or.

== History ==
A German airbase was in the town in WW-I.

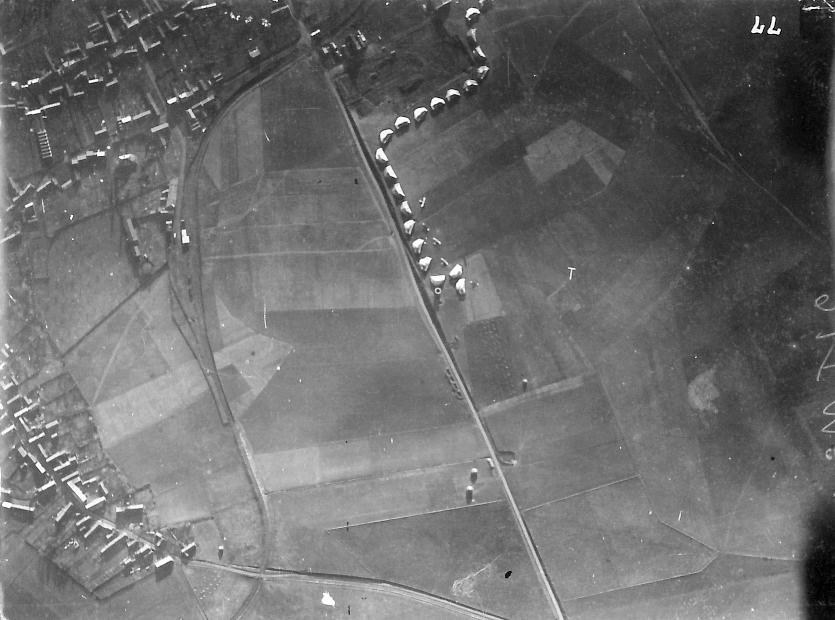
German Airbase in 1916

=== War memorial ===
In September 2018 the villagers of Villers-Outréaux dedicated an especially commissioned memorial to commemorate British soldier Jack Williams (VC), (Victoria Cross), to express their thanks for helping to save their village from certain destruction, in 1918

== See also ==
- Communes of the Nord department
