= 194th (2/1st South Scottish) Brigade =

- Active: 1915-1918
- Country: United Kingdom
- Branch: Territorial Army
- Type: Infantry
- Size: Brigade
- Part of: 65th (2nd Lowland) Division
- Engagements: World War I

The 194th (2/1st South Scottish) Brigade was an infantry brigade of the British Army, raised during World War I. The brigade was part of the Territorial Force and formed as a 2nd Line duplicate of the 155th (South Scottish) Brigade. Assigned to the 65th (2nd Lowland) Division, the brigade remained in the United Kingdom throughout the war.

== Origin ==
The units and formations of the Territorial Force were mobilised on the outbreak of war on 4 August 1914. Almost immediately, they were invited to volunteer for Overseas Service. On 15 August, the War Office issued instructions to separate those men who had signed up for Home Service only, and form them into reserve units. On 31 August, the formation of a reserve or 2nd Line unit was authorised for each 1st Line unit where 60 per cent or more of the men had volunteered for Overseas Service. The titles of these 2nd Line units would be the same as the original, but distinguished by a '2/' prefix. The large numbers of volunteers coming forward were assigned to these 2nd Line units for training. Later, the Home Service men were separated into provisional units, while the 2nd Line continued to train drafts for the 1st Line serving overseas.

== Order of battle ==
The brigade's initial composition was as follows:

- 2/4th Battalion, Royal Scots Fusiliers (RSF)
- 2/5th Battalion, Royal Scots Fusiliers
- 2/4th (Border) Battalion, King's Own Scottish Borderers (KOSB)
- 2/5th (Dumfries and Galloway) Battalion, King's Own Scottish Borderers

=== Reorganisation ===
In November 1915 the units of 65th (2nd L) Division were reorganised into composite battalions and numbered sequentially. At this time 194th Bde was composed as follows:

- No 13 Battalion (2/4th and 2/5th Bns, RSF, 2/5th (Cumberland) Bn, Border Regiment)
- No 14 Battalion (2/4th and 2/5th Bns, KOSB)
- No 15 Battalion (2/7th Bn, Royal Scots)
- No 16 Battalion (2/8th Bn, Royal Scots)

=== Later war ===
In January 1916 the composite battalions returned to their original regiments:

- 2/7th Bn Royal Scots – disbanded March 1918
- 2/8th Bn Royal Scots – disbanded summer 1917
- 2/4th Bn RSF – disbanded May 1918
- 2/5th Bn KOSB – disbanded May 1918
- 213th (Infantry) Battalion, Training Reserve – joined 23 July 1917; became 51st (Graduated) Bn, Cheshire Regiment 27 October 1917; remained at the Curragh when division was broken up

== Service ==
The brigade was formed in January 1915, but progressive training of the 2nd Line units was hampered by the need to provide frequent reinforcement drafts to the 1st Line, by the lack of up-to-date arms and equipment, and the reorganisation when Home Service men were drafted to separate units. By August 195, 65th (2nd L) Division had concentrated round Bridge of Allan, with 194th Bde at Rumbling Bridge, where it remained until the winter of 1915–16 when it was quartered at Falkirk, Grangemouth, Milnathort and Larbert. In March 1916 the division moved to Essex, where it joined Southern Army (Home Forces), with 194th Bde at Chelmsford.

Early in 1917 the division was sent to Ireland to relieve 59th (2nd North Midland) Division, which had been based there since the Easter Rising of 1916. 194th Brigade was stationed at Dublin and the Curragh, later moving to Oughterard and Moycullen.

65th (2nd Lowland) Division and its brigades were disbanded on 18 March 1918.

== Commanders ==
The following officers commanded the brigade:

- Colonel W.C. Douglas, 15 January 1915
- Brigadier-General F.A. Macfarlan, 17 March 1916 to 15 March 1918
