= Buire-sur-l'Ancre =

- Commune
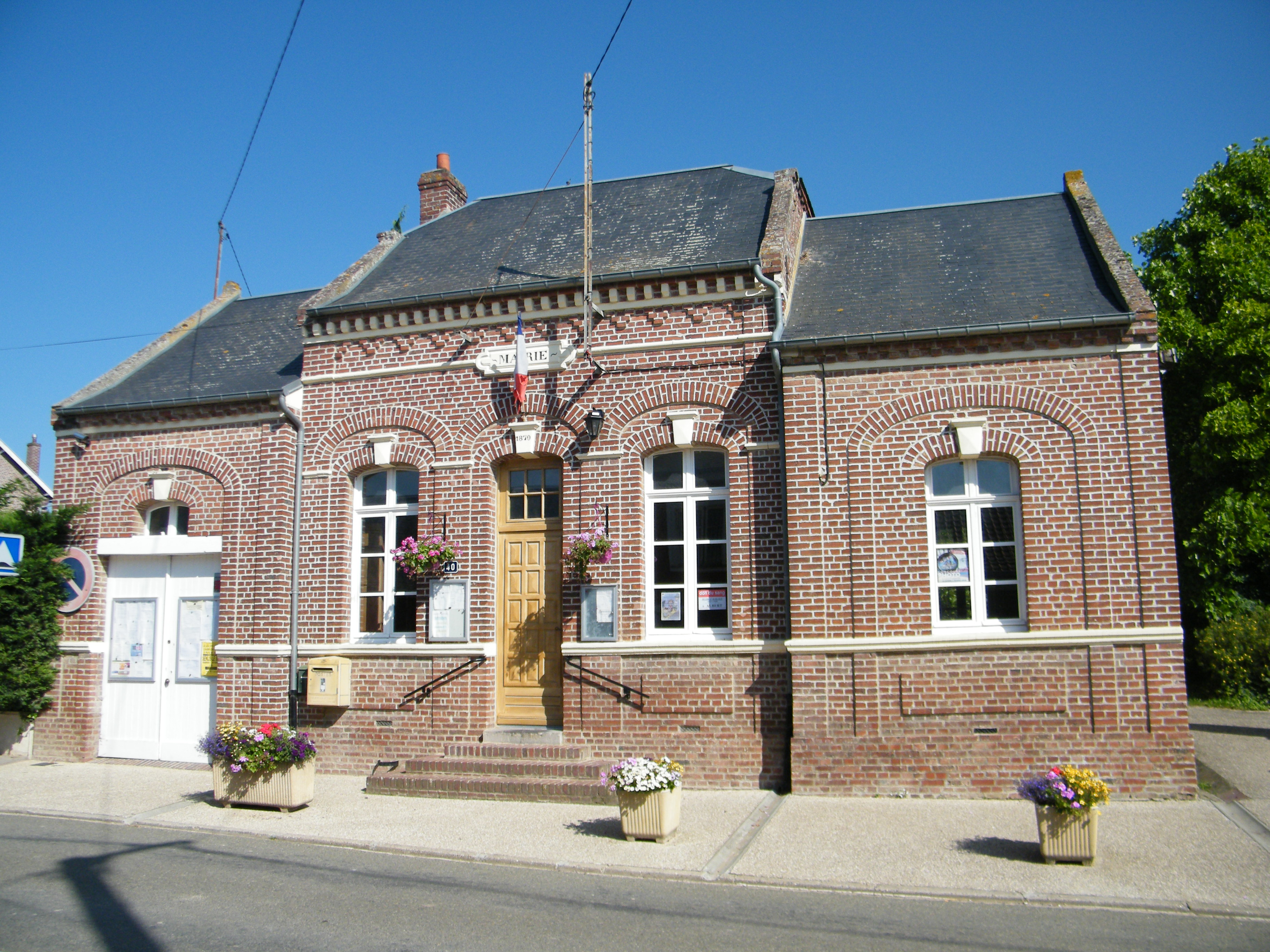
- The town hall in Buire-sur-l'Ancre
- Location of Buire-sur-l'Ancre
- Location within France Location within Hauts-de-France
- Coordinates: 49°57′56″N 2°35′35″E
- Country: France
- Region: Hauts-de-France
- Department: Somme
- Arrondissement: Péronne
- Canton: Albert
- Intercommunality: Pays du Coquelicot

Government
  - Mayor (2020–2026): Jean-Christian Ruin
- Area^{1}: 5.28 km^{2} (2.04 sq mi)
- Elevation: 43 m (141 ft)
- Highest elevation: 102 m (335 ft)
- Lowest elevation: 38 m (125 ft)
- Population (2023): 294
  - Density: 55.7/km^{2} (144/sq mi)
- Time zone: UTC+01:00 (CET)
  - Summer (DST): UTC+02:00 (CEST)
- INSEE/Postal code: 80151 /80300
- ^{1} French Land Register data, which excludes lakes, ponds, glaciers > 1 km^{2} (0.386 sq mi or 247 acres) and river estuaries.

Buire-sur-l'Ancre (French pronunciation: [bɥiʁ syʁ lɑ̃kʁ], literally Buire on the Ancre; Picard: Buire-su-l'Inque) is a commune in the Somme department in Hauts-de-France in northern France.

== Geography ==
The commune is situated on the D52 road, some 16 miles (26 km) northwest of Amiens.

== Population ==
Historical population
Year	Pop.	±% p.a.
1968	301	—
1975	293	−0.38%
1982	283	−0.49%
1990	304	+0.90%
1999	312	+0.29%
2007	330	+0.70%
2012	313	−1.05%
2017	310	−0.19%
2023	294	−0.88%
Source: INSEE

== See also ==
- Communes of the Somme department
