= Welsh Memorial Park, Ypres =

Welsh WWI memorial in Ypres, Belgium

Coordinates: 50.9029°N 2.9001°E

Welsh National Memorial Park
- Wales
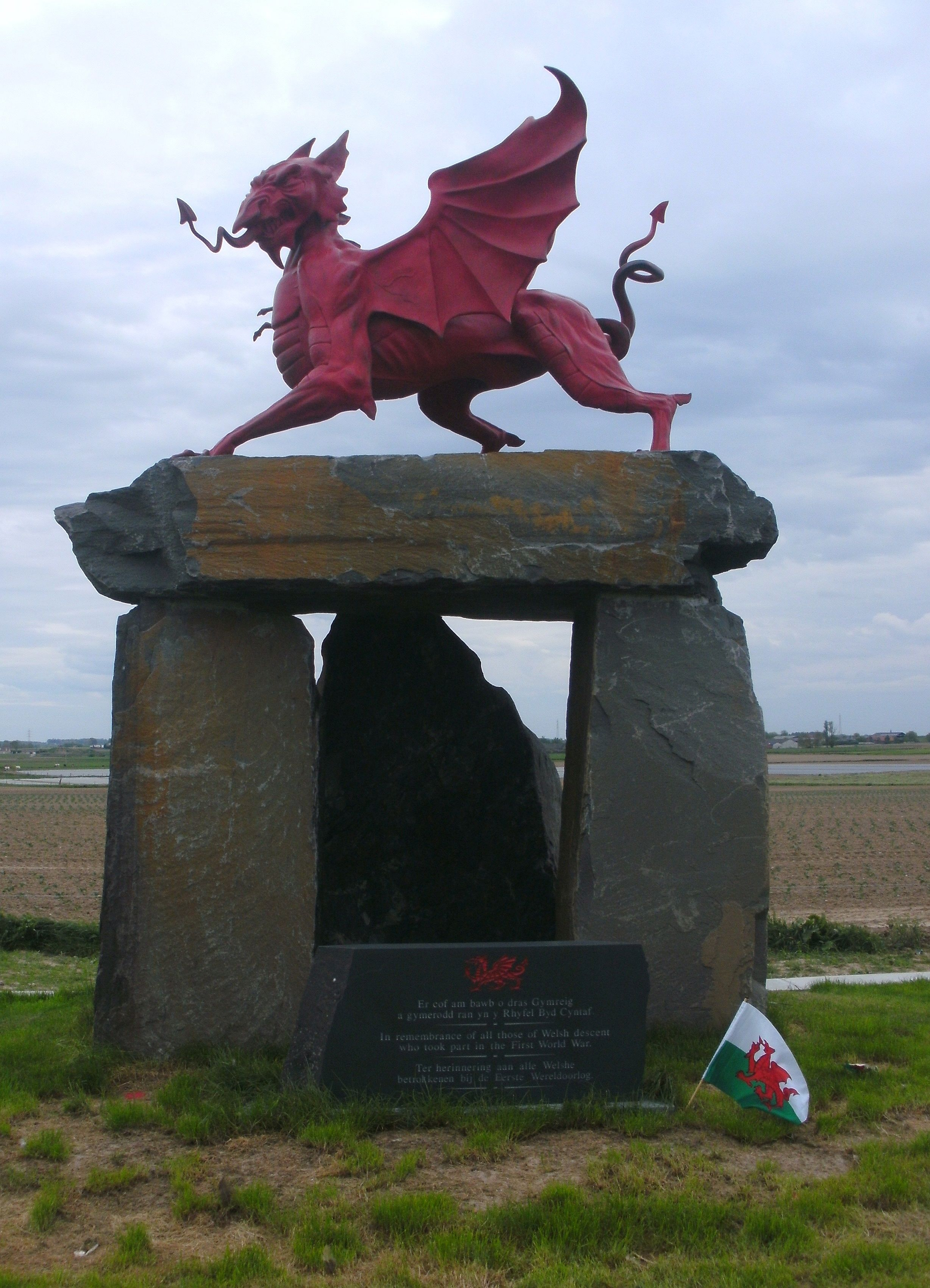
- For the Welsh serving in World War I
- Unveiled: 16 August 2014
- Location: near Boezinge, Belgium
- Designed by: Erwin Ureel (general design) and Lee Odishow (dragon sculpture)
- To all those of Welsh descent who took part in the First World War between 1914 and 1918.

The Welsh National Memorial Park is a war memorial in Langemark near Ypres (Belgium) for soldiers of World War I, located near the Pilkem Ridge in the former Ypres Salient. It commemorates the service of men and women of Welsh origin, wherever they served during the Great War as part of the Allied Powers, as well as the non-Welsh soldiers serving in Welsh formations.

== Location ==
The memorial is located in Langemark, North of Ypres /Ieper, approximately halfway in between Pilkem and Langemark. It stands on the ridge to the south west of Langemark, where in the summer of 1917 the Battle of Pilckem Ridge (31 July – 2 August 1917) was fought, and where many Welsh units took part in this opening attack of the main part of the Battle of Passchendaele (Third Battle of Ypres, 31 July – 10 November 1917). The battle saw the participation of the 38th (Welsh) Division, which fought through that area in July 1917 and earned Haig's comment that they were one of his best divisions. The 29th Division included among its units the 2nd Battalion South Wales Borderers and the 2nd Battalion Monmouthshire Regiment, and the Guards Division included the Welsh Guards, all of whom are represented in the nearby Artillery Wood Cemetery, along with men from the Welch Regiment and the Royal Welch Fusiliers. Among those killed near here on 31 July 1917 was 30-year-old Ellis Humphrey Evans ("Hedd Wyn"), the famous Welsh language poet who was posthumously awarded the bard's chair at the 1917 National Eisteddfod.

== Design ==
=== Cromlech memorial ===
The bronze dragon on top of the memorial was created by Lee Odishow, whose design was chosen from a selection of four artists. The general design (cromlech, surmounted by a dragon) is from Erwin Ureel MBE (originator of the Memorial idea) and Peter Carter Jones BEM (Chairman of the Welsh Committee). It takes the form of a cromlech, an edifice common to Celtic peoples, composed of three large upright blue pennant stone slabs and a large flat slab on the top. The cromlech is surmounted with an 8 ft red bronze dragon. The stone came from the Graig quarry in Pontypridd. The memorial is inscribed "To all those of Welsh descent who took part in the First World War between 1914 and 1918."

=== Other memorials ===
Beyond the cromlech memorial, the memorial park on Pilkem Ridge features a large boulder with a message of welcome in Welsh, a headstone shaped like those used by the Commonwealth War Graves Commission but inscribed with the words of the Welsh national anthem "Hen Wlad Fy Nhadau", and a flag pole with the Flag of Wales. Trees and benches surround the memorials.

== History ==
The memorial is the first Welsh war memorial built in Flanders, Belgium. and the first and only national Welsh Great War Memorial outside Wales (there is specific 38th Welsh Division Memorial at Mametz, Somme, France. It is the result of a three-year campaign by supporters of the Welsh Memorial in Flanders committee who wanted a permanent dedication to the Welsh victims of the conflict.

Wales lost more people as a percentage of its population than any other country . The memorial was not only erected to commemorate the people who died, but to remember with gratitude all those of Welsh descent who were involved in the Great War, regardless of the location where they served or their function (as a result, it includes the Home Front). The memorial was originally the idea of the local community, who bought the land on which it stands. A committee was set up in Wales consisting of Peter Carter Jones Welsh Committee Co-ordinator, Ian McLeod, Paul Silk, Ivan Beatty, Russel Harris, Alwyn & Glenna Bevan and Ian Gumm to raise the funds for the memorial itself. Several plans were considered and eventually the design by Lee Odishow was chosen. The Welsh Memorial in Flanders Campaign Charity was set up by the Welsh committee headed by Peter Carter Jones BEM and raised in excess of £250,000 with donations from Welsh Citizens. With the support of a Flemish committee headed by Erwin Ureel, the land on which the Memorial stands was given in perpetuity. The initial landscaping was financed by the Province of West- Flanders, an improved parking has been constructed by the Town Council of Langemark- Poelkapelle. The memorial was unveiled by First Minister Carwyn Jones, Flemish minister president Geert Bourgeois and Mayor Alain Wyffels on 16 August 2014.

An addition to the Memorial Garden is the erection of seven stones, showing the cap badges of the five Welsh Regiments and two Welsh Divisions which will be unveiled on 31 July 2017 as part of the Remembrance Service, which is being co-ordinated by the Welsh Government. The seven stones were donated by the same quarry in Pontypridd who gave the much larger stones for the Cromlech, and conveyed to the Memorial site by a Welsh transport firm (Rhys Davies Logistics) for which the Welsh Memorial Committee is very grateful.

== Gallery ==
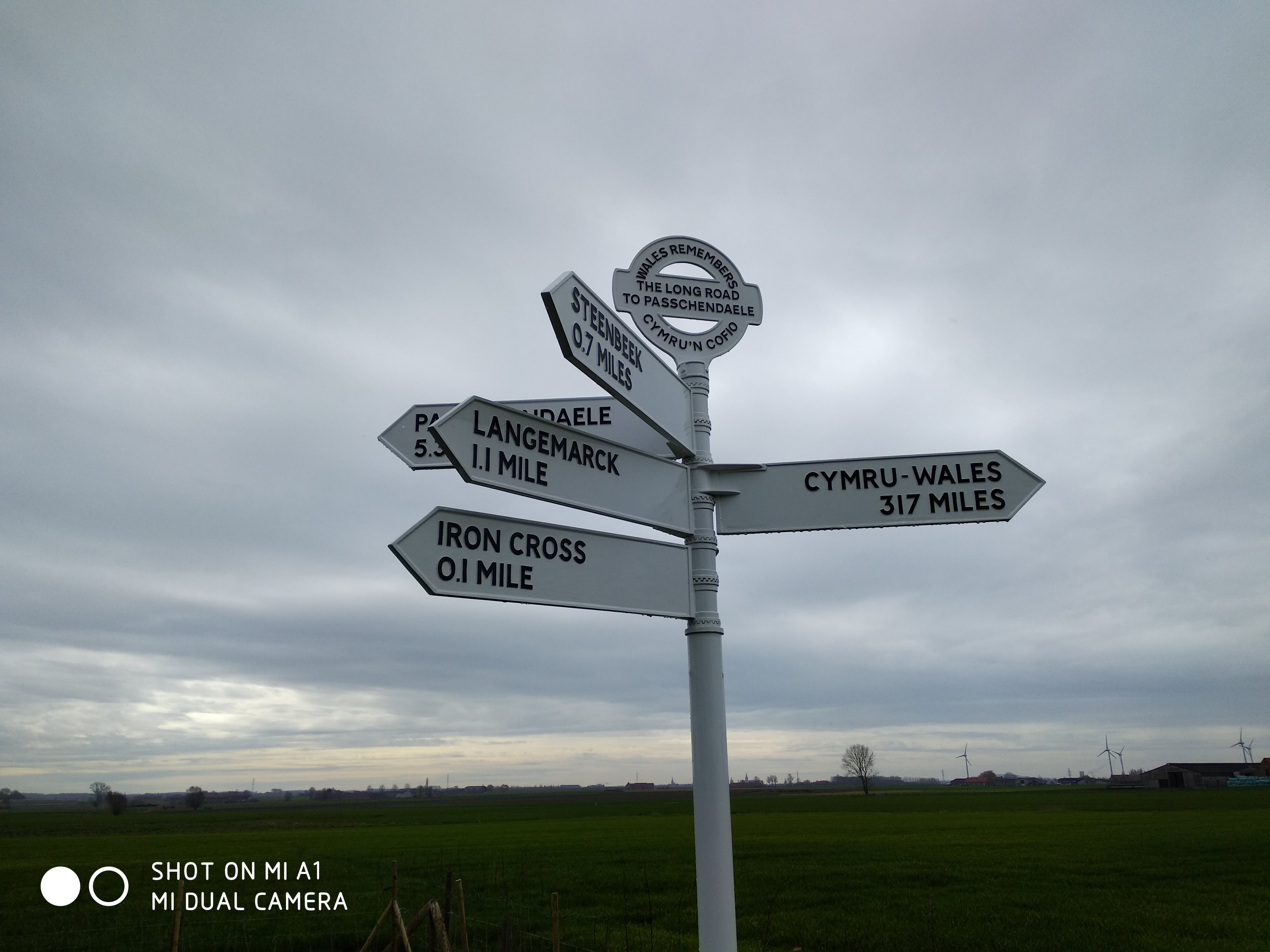
Signpost

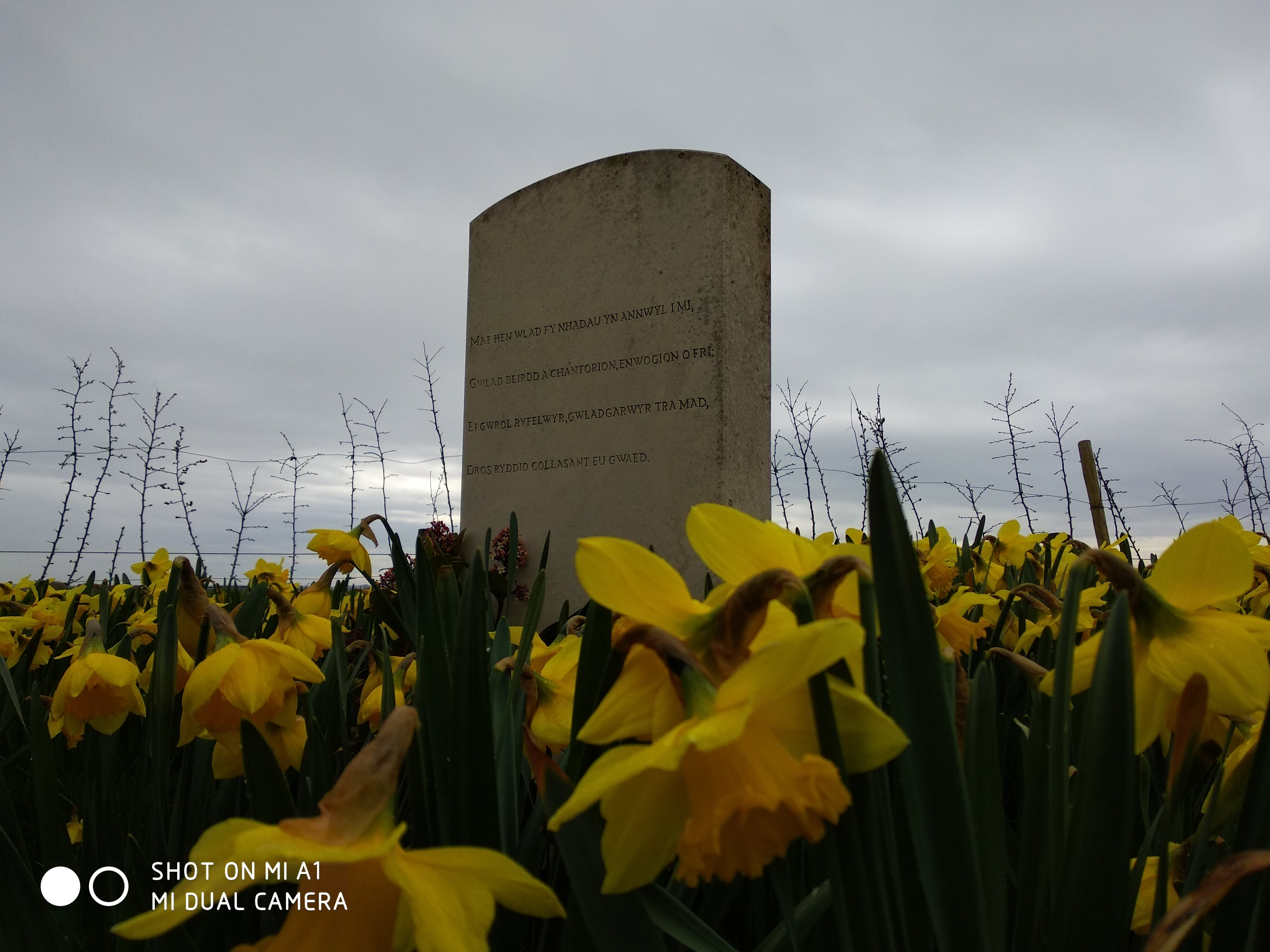
Hen Wlad Fy Nhadau & Daffodils

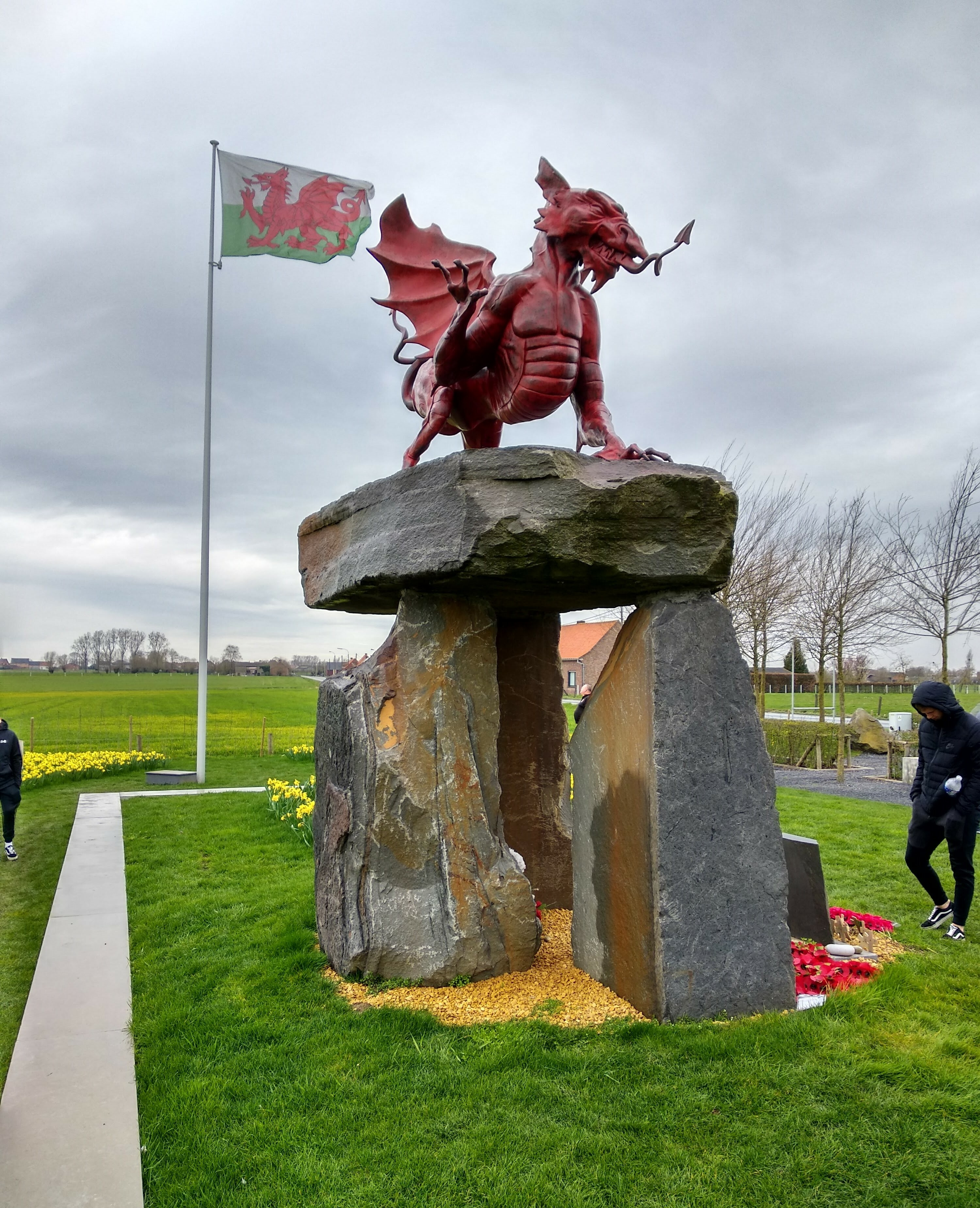
Cromlech monument & Daffodils

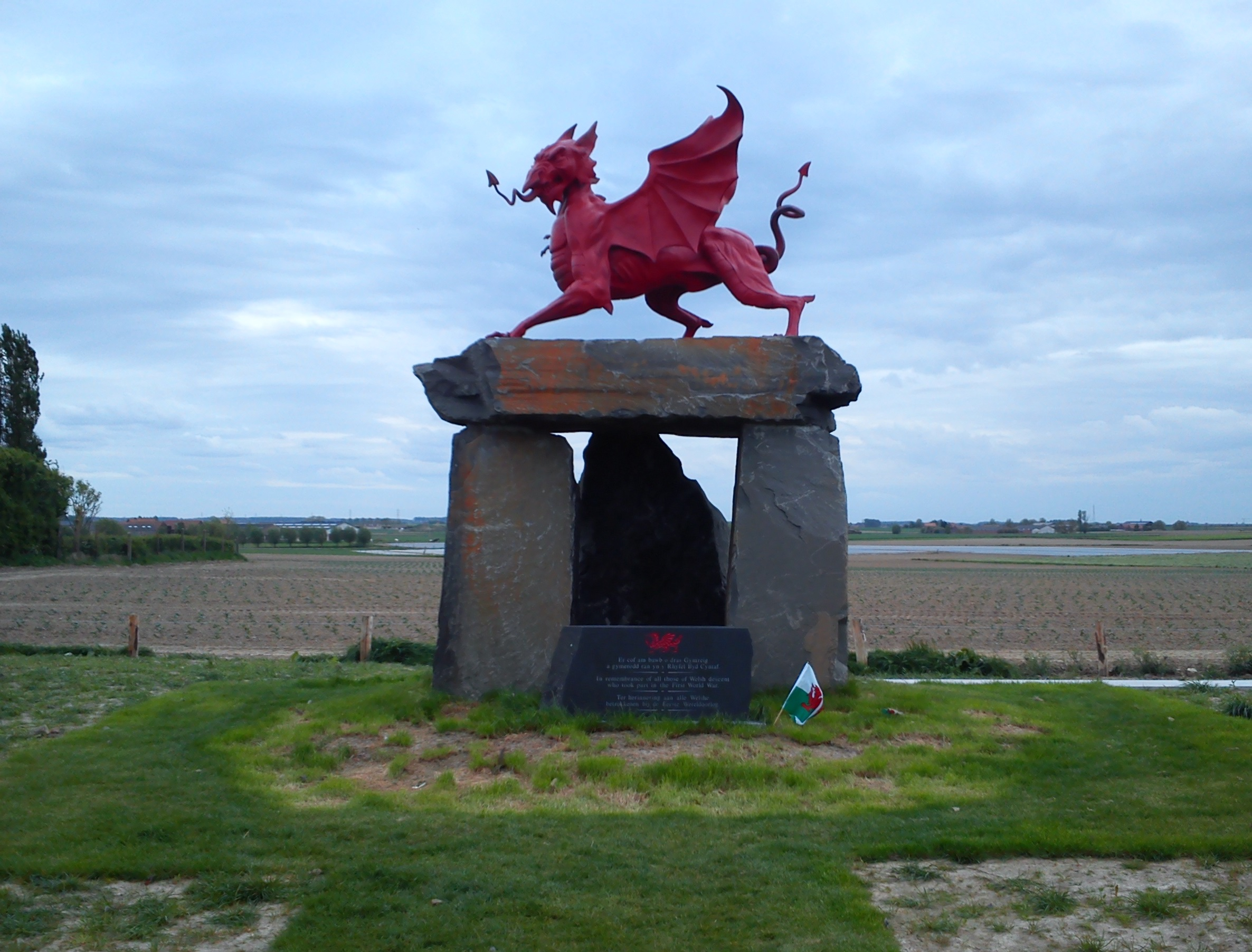
Cromlech monument

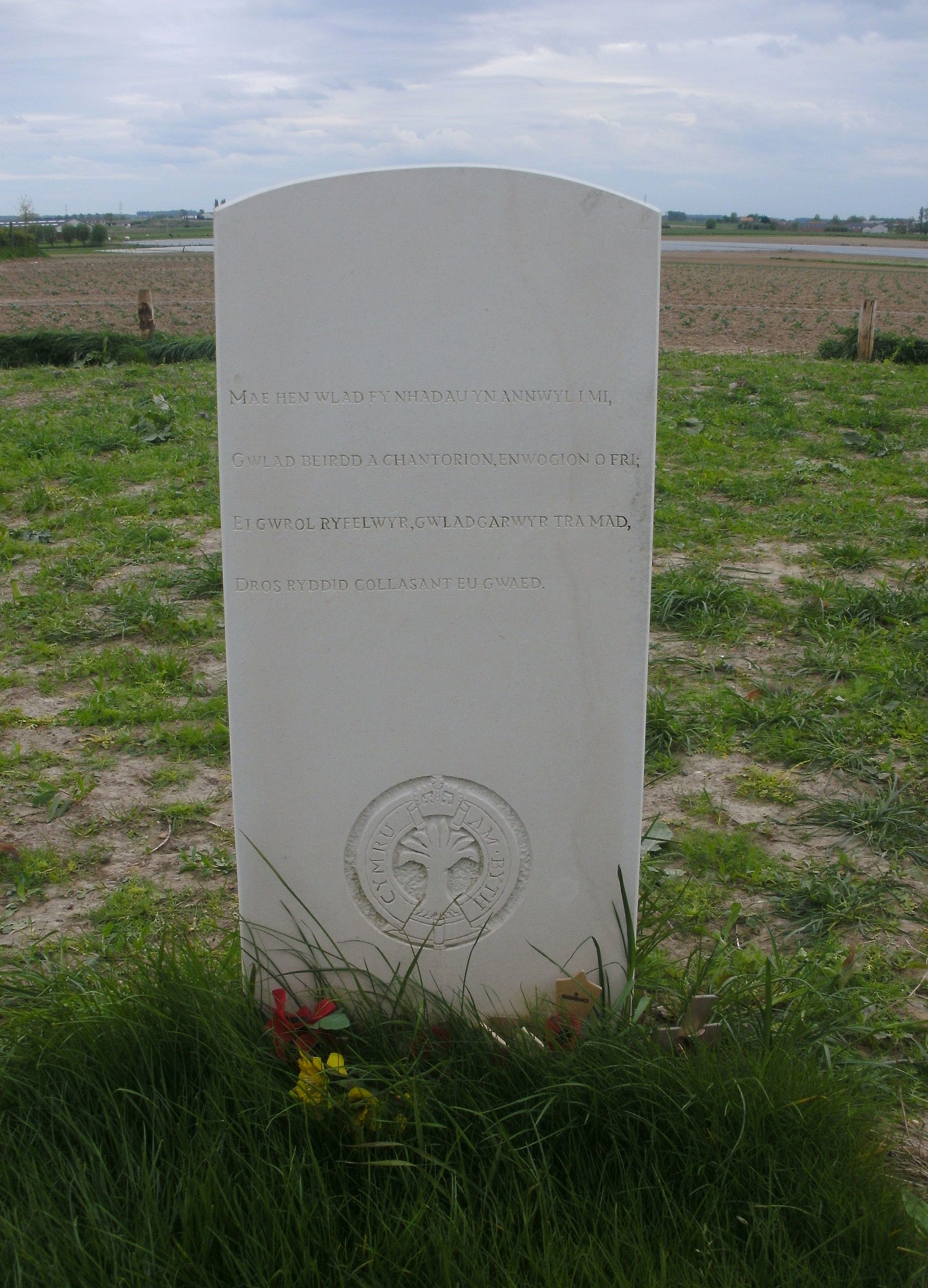
Headstone with Hen Wlad Fy Nhadau

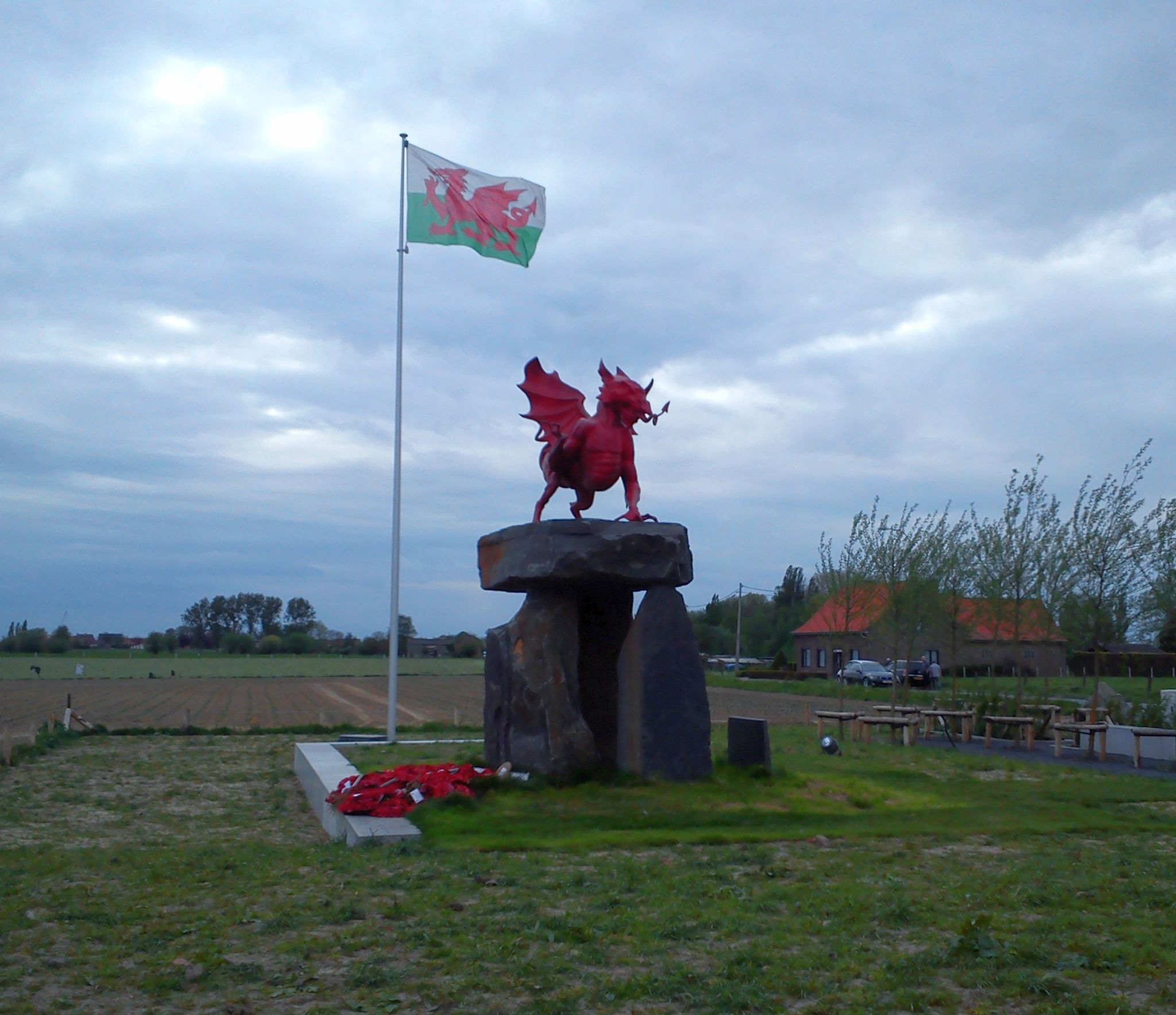
Memorial park

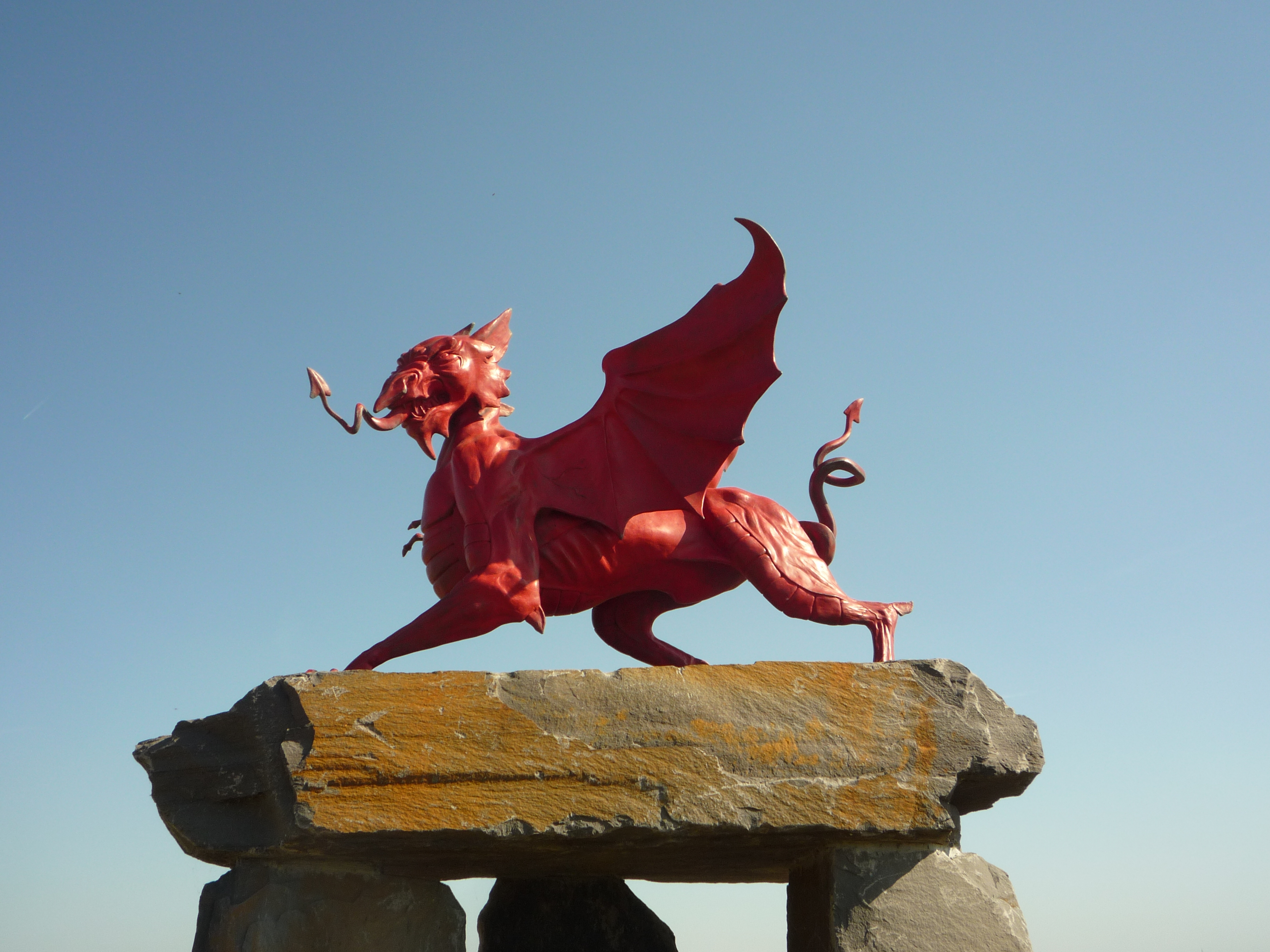
Dragon sculpture (detail)

== See also ==
- List of World War I memorials and cemeteries in Flanders
