= 1917 in Wales =

- Centuries: 18th; 19th; 20th; 21st
- Decades: 1890s; 1900s; 1910s; 1920s; 1930s
- See also: List of years in Wales; Timeline of Welsh history 1917 in The United Kingdom Scotland Elsewhere

This article is about the particular significance of the year 1917 to Wales and its people.

== Incumbents ==
- Archdruid of the National Eisteddfod of Wales – Dyfed
- Lord Lieutenant of Anglesey – Sir Richard Henry Williams-Bulkeley, 12th Baronet
- Lord Lieutenant of Brecknockshire – Joseph Bailey, 2nd Baron Glanusk
- Lord Lieutenant of Caernarvonshire – John Ernest Greaves
- Lord Lieutenant of Cardiganshire – Herbert Davies-Evans
- Lord Lieutenant of Carmarthenshire – John William Gwynne Hughes (until 2 January); John Hinds (from 22 March)
- Lord Lieutenant of Denbighshire – William Cornwallis-West (until 4 July)
- Lord Lieutenant of Flintshire – Henry Gladstone, later Baron Gladstone
- Lord Lieutenant of Glamorgan – Robert Windsor-Clive, 1st Earl of Plymouth
- Lord Lieutenant of Merionethshire – Sir Osmond Williams, 1st Baronet
- Lord Lieutenant of Monmouthshire – Ivor Herbert, 1st Baron Treowen
- Lord Lieutenant of Montgomeryshire – Sir Herbert Williams-Wynn, 7th Baronet
- Lord Lieutenant of Pembrokeshire – John Philipps, 1st Viscount St Davids
- Lord Lieutenant of Radnorshire – Powlett Milbank
- Bishop of Bangor – Watkin Williams
- Bishop of Llandaff – Joshua Pritchard Hughes
- Bishop of St Asaph – A. G. Edwards (later Archbishop of Wales)
- Bishop of St Davids – John Owen

== Events ==
- 6 February – Psychoanalyst Ernest Jones marries composer Morfydd Llwyn Owen.
- 6 July – Aqaba falls to a joint force of Arab irregulars and the supporters of Auda Abu Tayi, largely thanks to the efforts of T. E. Lawrence.
- 15 July – Poet Hedd Wyn posts his awdl "Yr Arwr" ("The Hero") as his entry for the poetry competition at the National Eisteddfod of Wales on the same day as he marches off with the 15th Battalion Royal Welch Fusiliers towards the Battle of Passchendaele in which he will be killed a fortnight later. On September 6 at the ceremony of Chairing of the Bard at the Eisteddfod, held at Birkenhead, the empty druidical chair which Hedd Wyn, as winner, should have occupied is draped in a black sheet, "The festival in tears and the poet in his grave." Contralto Laura Evans-Williams sings I Blas Gogerddan instead of the traditional chairing song. This becomes known as "The Eisteddfod of the Black Chair."
- 17 July – Prince Louis of Battenberg is created Marquess of Milford Haven.
- 18 July – The Rotary Club opens its first branch in Wales, at Cardiff. It is followed on 28 September by a branch at Llanelli.
- 25 August – The steamship Cymrian is torpedoed by a German U-boat off Porthcawl, resulting in the deaths of 10 crew.
- September – Hugh Evan-Thomas is promoted to vice-admiral.
- 10 September – Oakdale Workmen's Institute is officially opened.
- 28 October – The steamship Eskmere is torpedoed by a German U-boat in St Bride's Bay, resulting in the deaths of 20 crew.
- 7 December – The steamship Earl of Elgin is torpedoed by a German U-boat in Caernarfon Bay, resulting in the deaths of 18 crew.
- 15 December – The steamship Formby is torpedoed by a German U-boat north west of Bardsey Island, resulting in the deaths of 35 crew.
- 27 December – The steamship Adela is torpedoed by a German U-boat off the Skerries, Anglesey, resulting in the deaths of 24 crew.
- date unknown
  - Josiah Towyn Jones becomes a Junior Lord of the Treasury and government Whip.
  - Margaret Haig Thomas becomes Director of the Women's Department of the Ministry of National Service.
  - Trade unionist Ness Edwards is imprisoned as a conscientious objector.
  - St Winefride's Well at Holywell temporarily dries up as a result of mining activity.

== Arts and literature ==
- Papur Pawb ceases publication.

=== Awards ===
- National Eisteddfod of Wales (held in Birkenhead)
- National Eisteddfod of Wales: Chair – Hedd Wyn, "Yr Arwr"
- National Eisteddfod of Wales: Crown – William Evans (Wil Ifan)

=== New books ===
- A. G. Prys-Jones – Welsh Poets
- Moelona – Bugail y Bryn
- Mary Edith Nepean – Gwyneth of the Welsh Hills

=== Music ===
- Tenor Ifor Owen Thomas goes to study under Jean de Reszke in Paris.

== Sport ==
- Boxing: on 28 May Freddie Welsh is knocked out at the Manhattan Athletic Club, losing his world lightweight title after three years as champion.

== Births ==
- 9 January – Haydn Tanner, Wales rugby international and captain (died 2009)
- 21 January – Stan Richards, footballer (died 1987)
- 29 March – Gwyn Jones, physicist (died 2006)
- 21 April – Megs Jenkins, actress (died 1998)
- 22 April – Leo Abse, lawyer and politician (died 2008)
- 10 May – Bill Tamplin, Wales rugby international and captain (died 1989)
- 10 June – Meredith Edwards, actor (died 1999)
- 10 September – William Marsh, cricketer (died 1978)
- 11 September – Albert Young, footballer (died 2013)
- 8 October – Ronnie James, British champion boxer (died 1977)
- 24 October – Denys Val Baker, British writer and promoter of Celtic culture (died 1984)
- 27 October – Dylan Thomas, poet (died 1953)
- 26 November – Gerald James, actor (died 2006)
- 3 December – Esyllt T. Lawrence, feminist writer (died 1995)

== Deaths ==
- 2 January – John William Gwynne Hughes, Lord Lieutenant of Carmarthenshire, 58
- 31 January – Henry Bracy, tenor, 71
- 2 February – Frederick William Harris, coalowner, 84
- 28 February – Richard Lloyd, uncle of Lloyd George, 82
- 2 April – Bryn Lewis, Wales international rugby player, 26 (killed in action)
- 9 April – Edward Thomas, Anglo-Welsh poet, 39 (killed in action)
- 8 June – George Dobson, Wales international rugby union player
- 9 June – Thomas McKenny Hughes, geologist, 84
- 31 July
  - Ellis Humphrey Evans ("Hedd Wyn"), poet, 30 (killed in action)
  - James Llewellyn Davies, VC recipient, 31 (killed in action)
- 28 August – Dai Westacott, Wales international rugby union player, 35 (killed in action)
- 20 November – Richard William Leslie Wain, VC recipient, 20 (killed in action)
- 21 November – Rhys Jones Huws, poet, 55
- 25 November – John Williams, choirmaster, 61
- 1 December – Thomas Harry Basil Webb, son of Sir Henry Webb, 1st Baronet, 19 (killed in action)
- 14 December – Phil Waller, Wales and British Lions rugby player, 28 (killed in action)
- 25 December – Richard Jones Berwyn, colonist and writer, 54

== See also ==
- 1917 in Ireland
