= 1917 Birkenhead National Eisteddfod of Wales =

1917 eisteddfod in Birkenhead, England

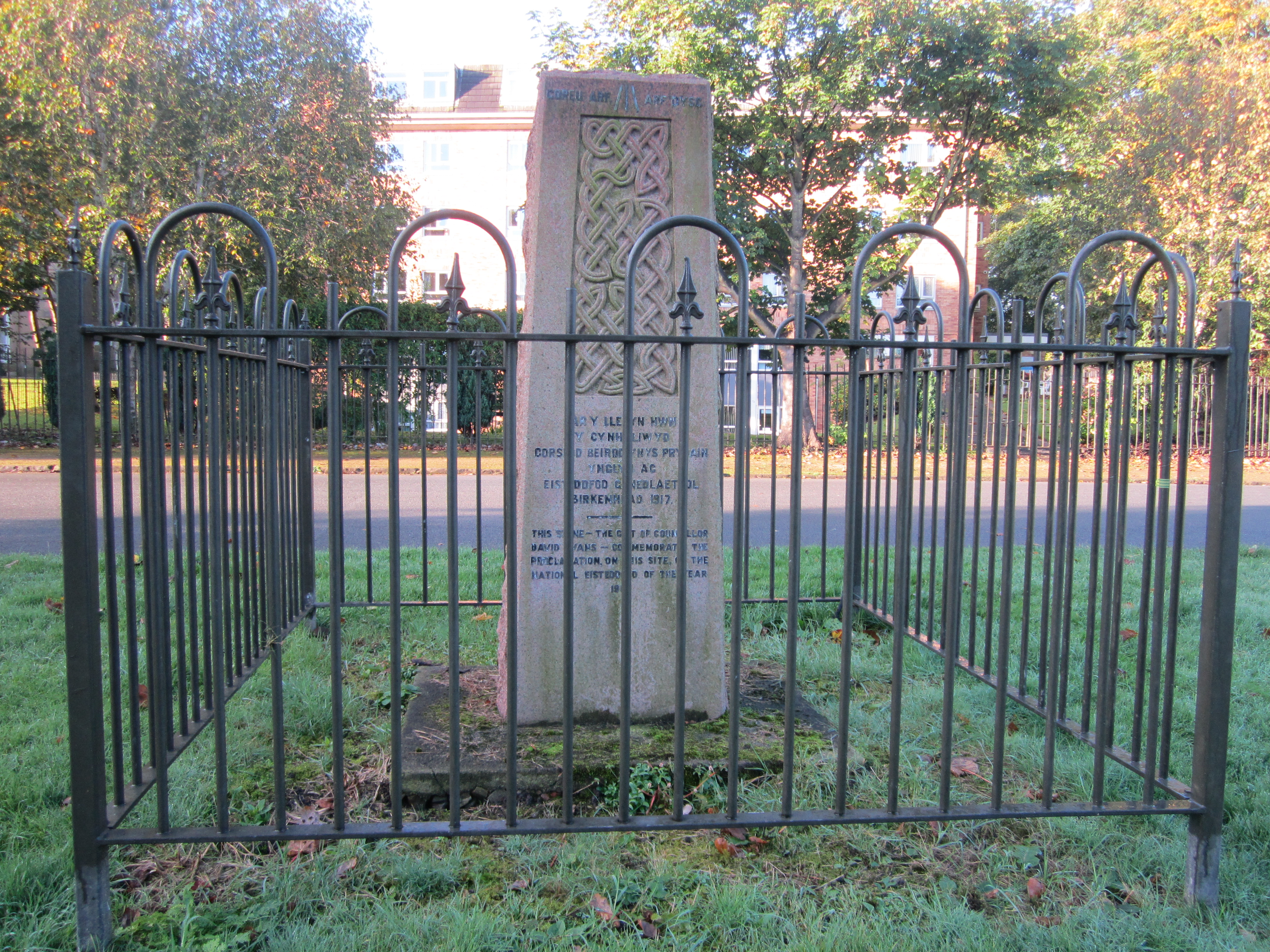
- Eisteddfod stone in Birkenhead Park
- Native name: Eisteddfod Genedlaethol Cymru, Penbedw 1917
- Date: 5–6 September 1917
- Duration: 2 days
- Location: Birkenhead Park; 53°23′36″N 3°2′29″W
- Theme: Welsh language and culture

The 1917 Birkenhead National Eisteddfod of Wales (Welsh: Eisteddfod Genedlaethol Cymru, Penbedw 1917) was held in Birkenhead Park, Birkenhead, Cheshire in England on 5 and 6 September 1917. This was the third time the National Eisteddfod of Wales had been held in Birkenhead.

The 1917 Eisteddfod became known as The Eisteddfod of the Black Chair, as a result of the Chair winner Ellis Humphrey Evans (known as Hedd Wyn) having been killed shortly beforehand in the Great War of 1914-1918.

== Background ==
The National Eisteddfod of Wales had been held every year since 1861, with the exception of 1914. Generally it was held in Wales, but had also been held in Chester, London and Liverpool and twice previously in Birkenhead. The Wirral Peninsula had historic connections to Wales with Wallasey, for example, meaning 'Island of the Welsh'.

The main competition events are the Chairing of the Bard and Crowning of the Bard.

The 1914-18 Great War was still raging at the time of the Eisteddfod and there was criticism of the Eisteddfod being held in a time of national stress. The wartime Prime Minister of the United Kingdom was the Welsh-speaking David Lloyd George, who attended the event - the last time a prime minister had attended the eisteddfod was in 1873 when William Gladstone had attended in Mold.

== Proclamation ==
The proclamation event of the Birkenhead Eisteddfod took place on Cannon Hill in the town on 24 June 1916. In addition to the Archdruid and secretary of the Gorsedd, others taking part included Members of Parliament W. Llewelyn Williams and J. H. Hinds, and the Mayor and Mayoress of Birkenhead.

== 1917 eisteddfod events ==
A procession of the bards took place on the Wednesday and Thurday mornings, ending on Cannon Hill in Birkenhead Park. There were women's choir and children's choir competitions.

A telegram was read out, from the Welsh Division on the frontline of the war, wishing success and prosperity to the eisteddfod.

Wil Ifan Pwyll was awarded the Bardic Crown on the first day, though to the displeasure of the master of ceremonies he did not attend to collect his prize. The stage manager stood in for Pwyll for the crowning ceremony.

On the Thursday morning of the eisteddfod, Lance Corporal Samuel Evans was presented with a rosette and button, in front of a silent audience. He was the sole survivor of a male voice choir, who he'd led at the 1915 National Eisteddfod.

=== Black Chair ===
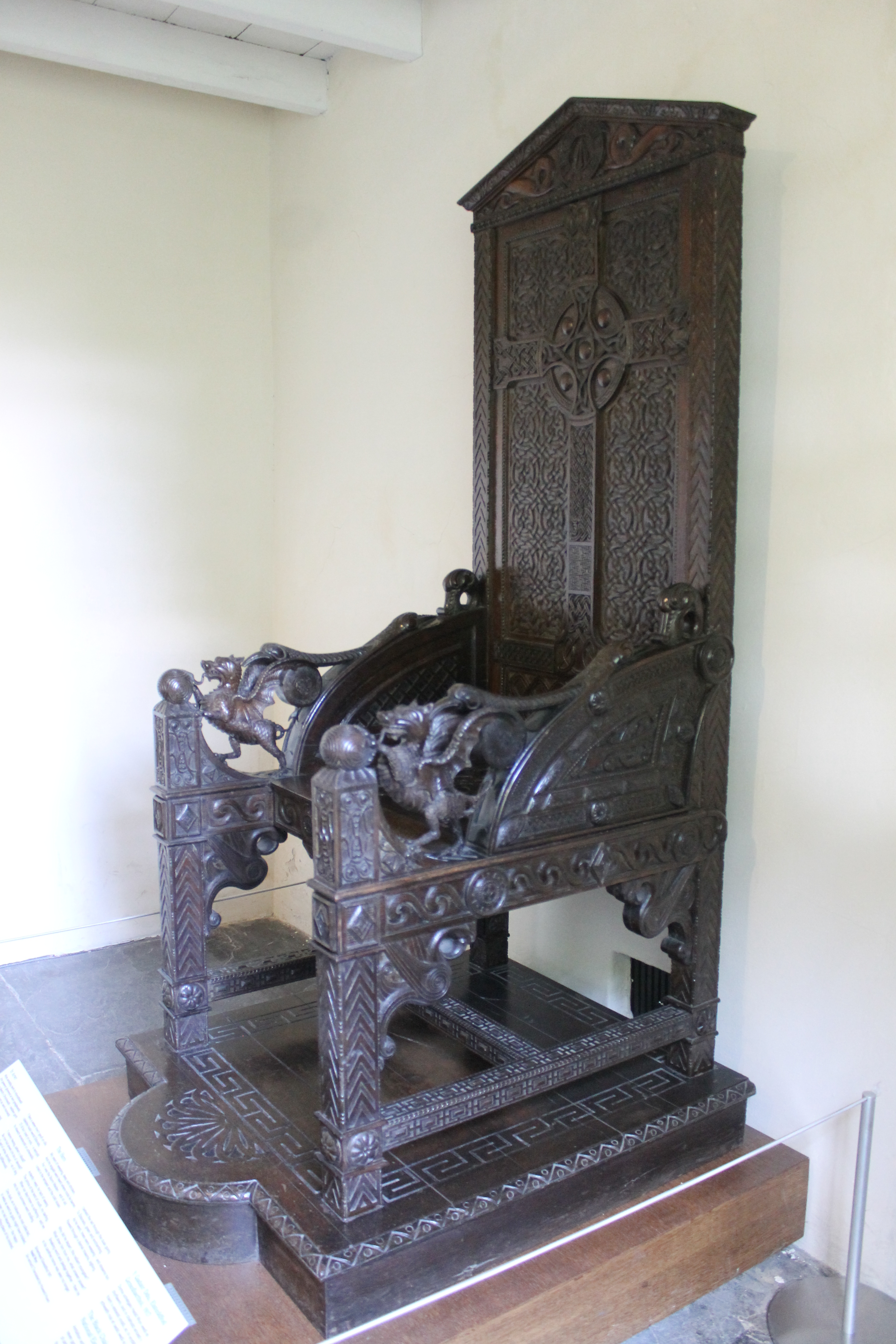
Y Gadair Ddu (The Black Chair)

The chairing of the bard took place on the afternoon of 6 September, with the UK's wartime prime minister David Lloyd George in attendance. It was announced that the poet under the pen name of 'Fleur-de-lys' was the winner. Then, in the silence that followed, it was announced that Hedd Wyn (the poet behind the pseudonym) had in fact died in the war and was buried in France. Wyn (whose name translates as 'Blessed Peace') had been killed on 31 July, the first day of the Battle of Passchendaele, and was actually buried at Artillery Wood Cemetery in Belgium. Only a few weeks beforehand he had returned to his battalion in northern France and had finished his poem, Yr Arwr (The Hero), before posting it as his entry to the Eisteddfod. Ironically, the chair had been made by a Belgian refugee from the war, Eugeen Vanfleteren. Upon the announcement of Hedd Wyn's death, the chair was draped in a black sheet, thereby becoming known as the Black Chair. According to a news report, "there was hardly a dry eye in the place" as Laura Evans Williams sang the chairing song.

== Aftermath ==
After the Eisteddfod had finished, the Black Chair was transported by train to Hedd Wyn's home village of Trawsfynydd. It was carried in a procession to the village hall where a memorial meeting was held. The chair then remained in the family house, which was later turned into a museum in the poet's memory.

In 2005 a Birkenhead councillor called for the National Eisteddfod to return to the town in 2007, to mark the 90th anniversary of the Black Chair Eisteddfod. However, an invitation from Liverpool to host the 2008 National Eisteddfod had already been rejected.

A memorial to the chairing of Hedd Wyn was unveiled in Birkenhead Park, at the Birkenhead Festival on 9 September 2017.
