= Francis Ledwidge =

Irish poet

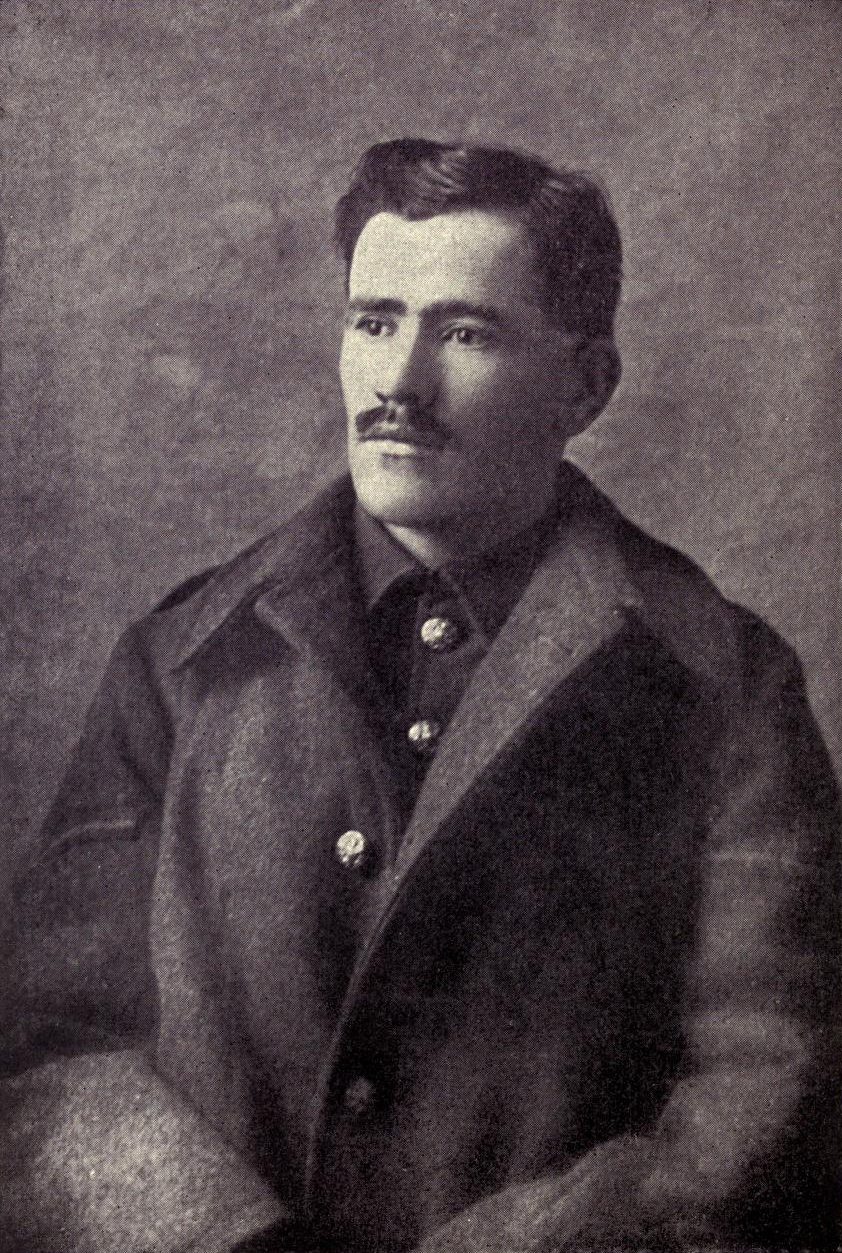
- Ledwidge in uniform
- Born: 19 August 1887; Janeville, Slane, County Meath
- Died: 31 July 1917 (aged 29); Pilckem Ridge, near Boezinge, Passchendaele salient, Belgium
- Occupations: Labourer, miner, writer and poet
- Writing career
- Period: 1890s–1917
- Genre: Poetry

Francis Edward Ledwidge (19 August 1887 – 31 July 1917) was an Irish poet. From Slane, County Meath, and sometimes known as the "poet of the blackbirds", he was later also known as a First World War war poet. He befriended the established writer Lord Dunsany, who helped with the publication of his works. He was killed in action at Ypres in 1917.

Born to a poor family in Slane, County Meath, Ledwidge started writing at an early age and was first published in a local newspaper at the age of 14. Finding work as a labourer and miner, he was also a trade union activist, and a keen patriot and nationalist, associated with Sinn Féin. He became friendly with a local landowner, the writer Lord Dunsany, who gave him a workspace in the library of Dunsany Castle, and introduced him to literary figures including William Butler Yeats, Æ and Katherine Tynan, with whom he had a long-term correspondence. He was elected to a local government post and helped organise the local branch of the Irish Volunteers, while Dunsany edited the first volume of his poetry and helped him secure publication for it.

Despite having sided with the faction of the Irish Volunteers which opposed participation in the war, and against the wishes of Lord Dunsany, he enlisted in the Royal Inniskilling Fusiliers in October 1914 and continued to write poetry on campaign, sending work to Dunsany and to family and other friends. Having been posted to several theatres of the war, he was killed in action in July 1917 during the early phase of the Battle of Passchendaele. At the time of his death, he and Dunsany were in advanced preparation for a second volume of his work, and Dunsany later arranged for a third volume and a collected edition of 122 poems in 1919. Some musical settings of his work were also composed. Further poems, from the archives at Dunsany Castle and some material held by families of relatives and friends, were published by Ledwidge's biographer, Alice Curtayne, in 1974, by enthusiast Hubert Dunn and by the two major Ledwidge memorial groups, in 1997 and 2022 respectively.

A museum of his life and work was opened in his birthplace cottage in 1982 and was the site of multiple events in the decades after; it remains operational as of 2022. Ledwidge was selected as one of twelve prominent war poets - and the only Irish one - for the exhibition Anthem for Doomed Youth at the Imperial War Museum in London in 2002. He has been memorialised at events at the Slane museum, in Ypres and in Inchicore, Dublin, with his official centenary commemoration at Slane in 2017 and his work set to music and performed by Anúna at the former Inchicore barracks the same year. A few Ledwidge manuscripts are held in the National Library of Ireland, and the main surviving collection, including his early works, is in the archives of Dunsany Castle, along with letters. Selections of both handwritten and typed manuscripts have been shown publicly at the Anthem for Doomed Youth exhibition and at a book launch at Slane Castle in 2022, and privately to scholars and members of the Ledwidge Cottage Museum committee.

== Early life and work ==
Francis Ledwidge, known to his family as "Frank", was born at Janeville (Baile Sinead) on the eastern edge of Slane, in County Meath, Ireland, the eighth of nine children in a poverty-stricken family. His parents, Patrick Ledwidge and his wife Anne Lynch (1853–1926), believed in giving their children the best education they could afford; however, when Francis was only five, his father Patrick died, which forced his wife and the children out to work at an early age.

Francis left the local national school aged thirteen, and while he continued to educate himself, he worked at what work he could find. Employment included work as a farm hand, road surface mender and supervisor of roadwork, copper miner at Beaupark Mine near Slane (from which post he was sacked for organising a strike for better mining conditions, three years before the general 1913 strike, having been a trade union activist since 1906) and, briefly, a shop assistant in Dublin.

Appointed secretary of the Slane branch of the Meath Labour Union (1913–14) he had aspirations towards permanent white-collar work. He was known for his connections with Sinn Féin.

== Early poetry and nationalism ==
Strongly built, with striking brown eyes and a sensuous face, Ledwidge was a keen poet, writing wherever he could – sometimes even on gates or fence posts. From the age of fourteen his works were published in a local newspaper, the Drogheda Independent, and reflected his passion for the Boyne Valley. He was also published with some regularity in the Irish Weekly Independent and Sunday Independent from mid-1909. These early poetry publications were largely unpaid.

While working as a road labourer, he wrote to the Anglo-Irish landlord and fantasy writer and dramatist Lord Dunsany, in 1912, enclosing copybooks containing his early work. Dunsany, a man of letters already well known in Dublin and London literary and dramatic circles, and whose own start in publishing had been with a few poems, felt that his work had potential, and promoted him in Dublin, including at a salon of Æ. Dunsany and Æ introduced Ledwidge to a range of Irish literary figures, including W.B. Yeats and Oliver St. John Gogarty, with whom Ledwidge became further acquainted.

Dunsany supported Ledwidge with money and literary advice for some years, providing him with access to and a workspace in Dunsany Castle's library, where he met the Irish writer Katharine Tynan, subsequently corresponding with her regularly. Dunsany later prepared his first collection of poetry Songs of the Fields, which successfully appealed to the expectations of the Irish Literary Revival and its social taste for rural poetry. Despite Ledwidge's growing association with the aristocratic Lord Dunsany, he retained a keen interest in the conditions of working men. He was one of the founder members in 1906 of the Slane branch of the Meath Labour Union. He familiarised himself with the writings of James Connolly and, despite the Vatican's condemnations of Marxism, Ledwidge found no contradiction between Roman Catholicism and socialism. In 1913 he was temporary secretary of the union, the following year elected to the Navan district rural council and board of guardians.

=== Home Rule ===
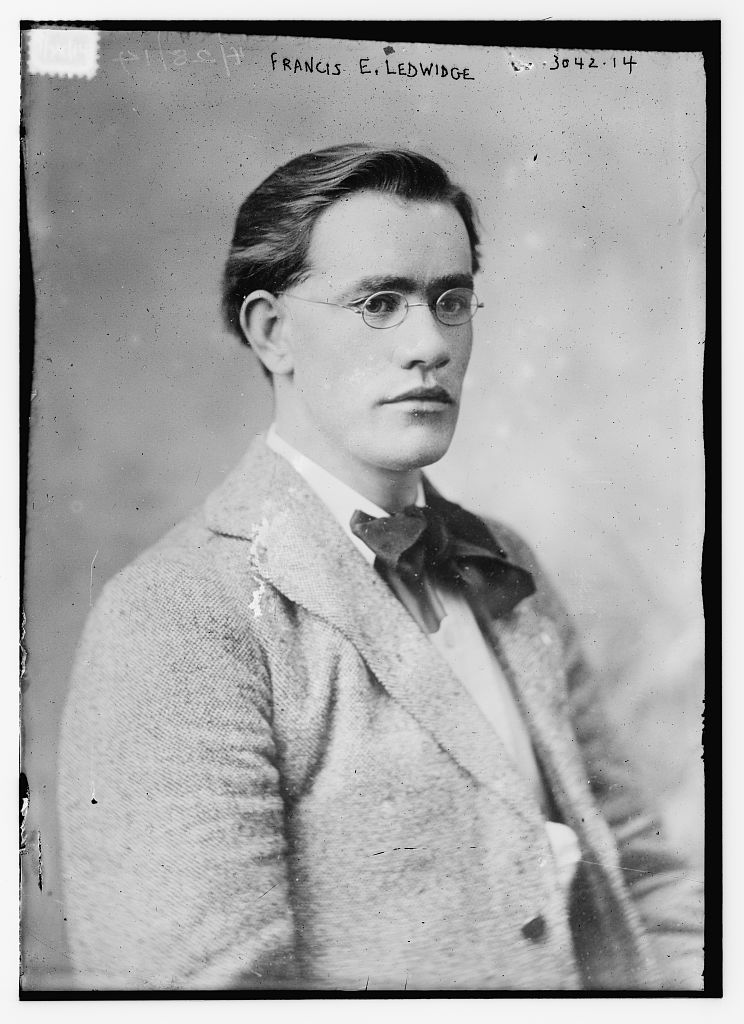
Francis Ledwidge c. 1914

Ledwidge was a keen patriot and nationalist. His efforts to found a branch of the Gaelic League in Slane were thwarted by members of the local council. The area organiser encouraged him to continue his struggle, but Francis gave up. He did manage to act as a founding member with his brother Joseph of the Slane Branch of the Irish Volunteers (1914), a paramilitary force created in response to the founding of the Ulster Volunteers, who had sworn to resist Home Rule for Ireland even if it meant civil war. The Irish Volunteers were set up to fight the Unionists if necessary and to ensure that Home Rule would come to pass.

== Military service ==
On the outbreak of World War I in August 1914, and on account of Ireland's involvement in the war, the Irish Volunteers split into two factions, the National Volunteers who supported John Redmond's appeal to join Irish regiments in support of the Allied cause and those who did not. Francis was originally of the latter party. Nevertheless, having defended this position strongly at a local council meeting, he soon after enlisted (24 October 1914) in Lord Dunsany's regiment, joining the 5th battalion Royal Inniskilling Fusiliers, part of the 10th (Irish) Division. This was against Lord Dunsany's wishes and he had offered Ledwidge a stipend to support him if he stayed out of the war. Some have speculated that he went to war because his sweetheart Ellie Vaughey had found a new lover, John O'Neill, whom she later married, but Ledwidge himself wrote, quite forcefully, that he could not stand aside while others sought to defend Ireland's freedom.

=== Later poetry and war ===
Ledwidge seems to have fitted into Army life well, and rapidly achieved promotion to lance corporal. In 1915, he saw action in the Landing at Suvla Bay during the Gallipoli Campaign, where he suffered severe rheumatism. Having survived huge losses sustained by his company, Ledwidge became ill after a back injury gained during the Battle of Kosturino in Serbia (December 1915), a locale which inspired a number of poems.

Ledwidge was dismayed by the news of the Easter Rising, writing a lament for his friend Thomas MacDonagh, one of the Rising's leaders who was executed in May 1916. He grew disenchanted with the war effort, and was court-martialled and demoted for overstaying his furlough and being drunk in uniform (May 1916). He gained and lost stripes over a period in Derry (he was a corporal when the introduction to his first book was written), and then, returned to the front, received back his lance corporal's stripe one last time in January 1917 when posted to the Western Front, joining 1st Battalion, Royal Inniskilling Fusiliers, part of 29th Division.

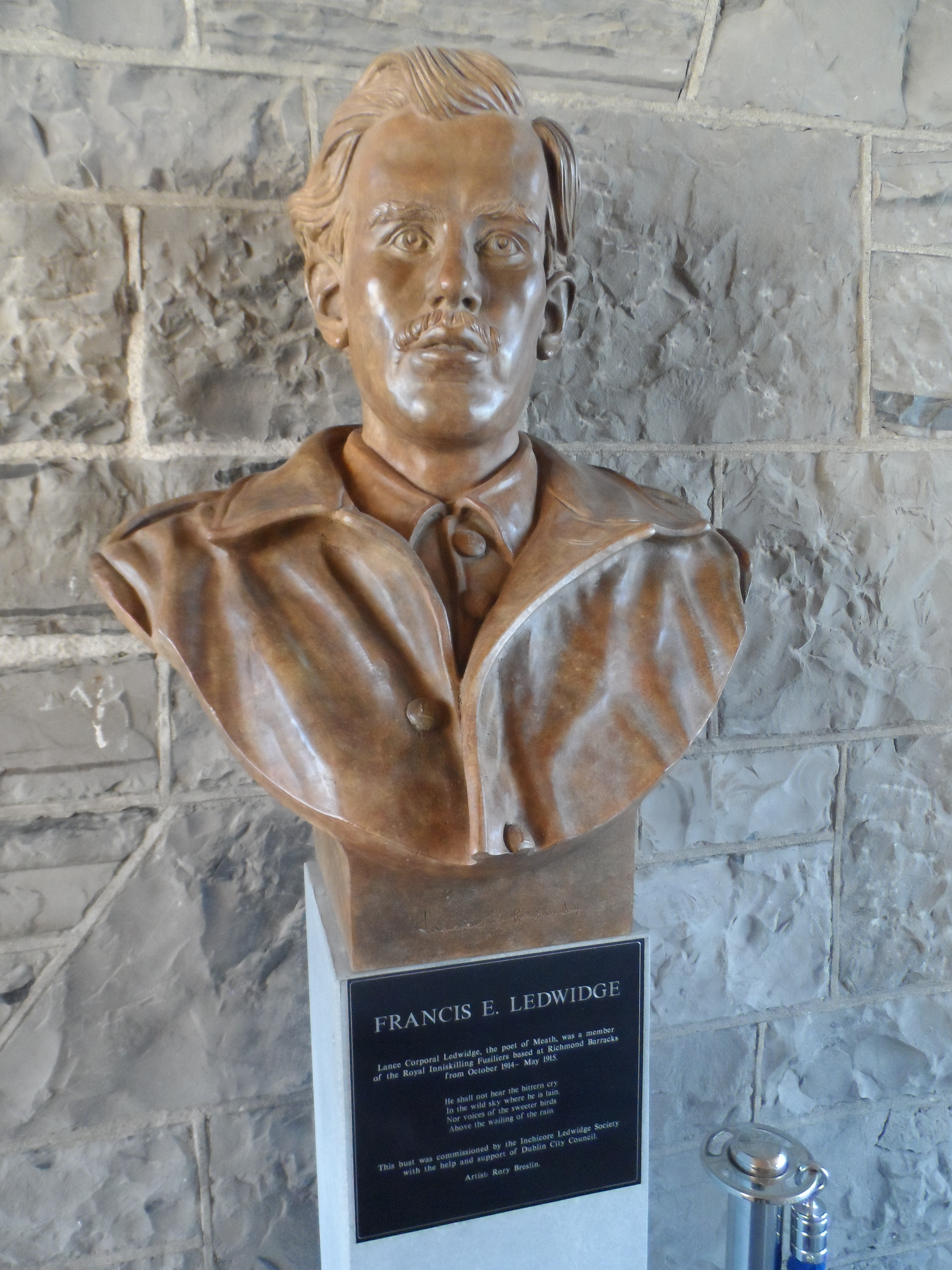
Bust of Ledwidge in Richmond Barracks

Ledwidge continued to write when feasible throughout the war years, though he lost many works, for example, in atrocious weather in Serbia. He sent much of his output to Lord Dunsany, himself moving on war assignments, as well as to readers among family, friends and literary contacts.

== Death and aftermath ==
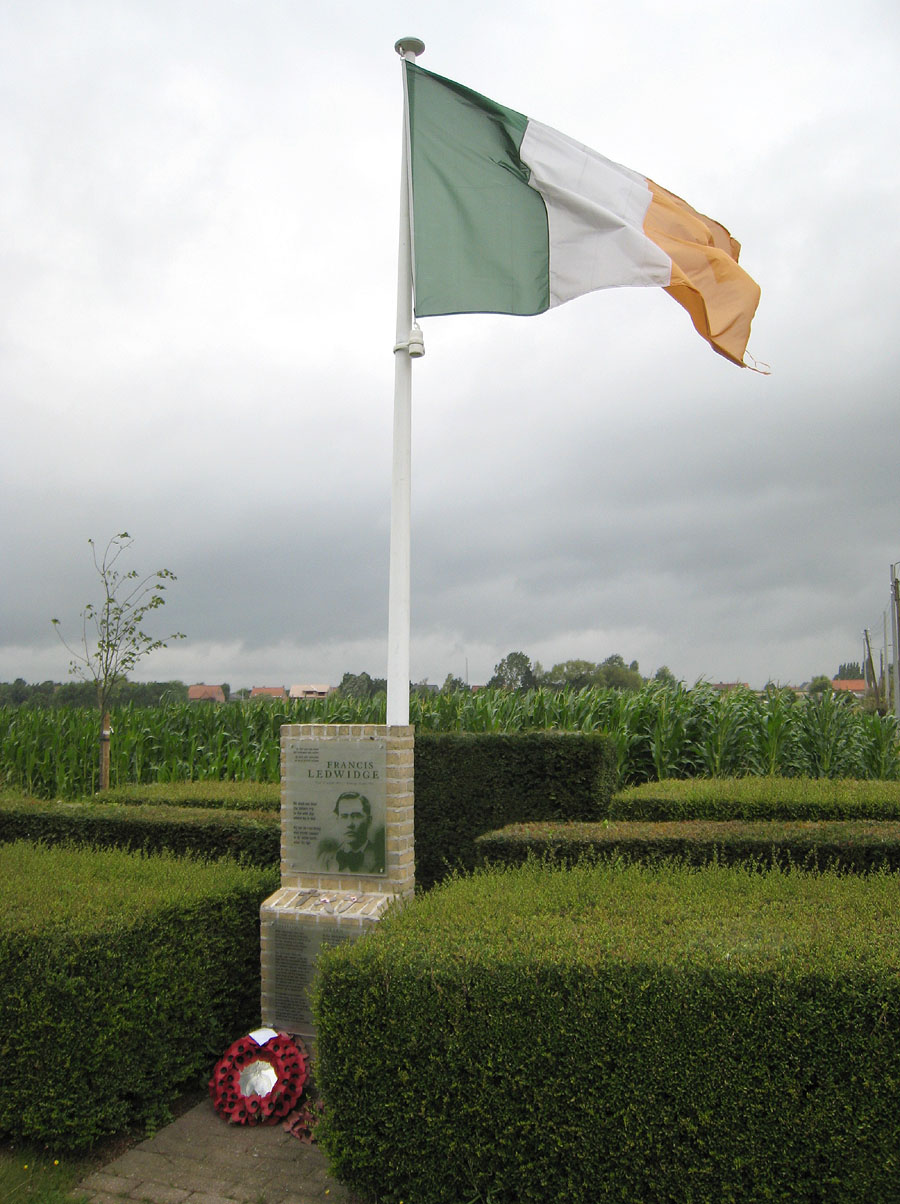
Memorial to Francis Ledwidge on the spot where he died

The poems Ledwidge wrote on active service reveal his pride at being a soldier, as he believed, in the service of Ireland. He often wondered whether he would find a soldier's death. On 31 July 1917, a group from Ledwidge's battalion of the Royal Inniskilling Fusiliers were road-laying in preparation for an assault during the earliest stages of the Third Battle of Ypres (July to November 1917), near the village of Boezinge, northwest of Ypres.

According to Alice Curtayne, "Ledwidge and his comrades had been toiling since the early morning at road-making. The army's first need was men; their second, guns; their third roads. These latter consisted mainly of heavy beech planks bolted together, which could be rapidly laid down. No advance could be supported in that sodden land without a sufficiency of these communications tracks, six or seven feet wide. Supplies were conveyed by pack mules over the wooden paths. Survivors concur in placing the road work done by B Company that day one mile north-east of Hell Fire Corner, so called because it was very exposed to German shelling. There was a violent rainstorm in the afternoon, shrouding the region in a grey monochrome. Sullenly, the enemy's long-range guns continued to fling their shells far behind the lines. Road-work could not be suspended, however, as the tracks were in use as fast as they were laid down. Tea was issued to the men and, drenched to the skin, they stopped to swallow it. A shell exploded beside Ledwidge and he was instantly killed."

A Roman Catholic military chaplain, Father Devas, was the first on the scene. That night, Father Devas wrote in his diary, "Crowds at Holy Communion. Arranged for service but washed out by rain and fatigues. Walk in rain with dogs. Ledwidge killed, blown to bits; at Confession yesterday and Mass and Holy Communion this morning. R.I.P."

=== Burial ===
Francis Ledwidge was first buried at Carrefour de Rose, and later re-interred in the nearby Artillery Wood Military Cemetery, at Boezinge, (where the Welsh poet Hedd Wyn, who was killed in action on the same day, also lies buried).

=== Folklore ===
According to a local folktale, the ghostly apparition of Ledwidge appeared in Navan at the same time he died on the Western front. His ghost greeted a friend before fading away.

== Legacy and archives ==
=== Memorials ===
A stone tablet commemorates Ledwidge in the Island of Ireland Peace Park, Messines, Belgium. His work as "peasant poet" and "soldier poet", once a standard part of the Irish school curriculum, faded from view for several decades of the 20th century. Its intensity, coupled with a revived interest in his period, has restored it to life.

The Flanders Fields memorial in Dublin's Peace Park is engraved with poetry from Ledwidge.

=== Interest groups ===
A local committee opened the Ledwidge Cottage Museum in the poet's childhood home at Janeville, Slane, in June 1982, and is now run by the founding committee's successor and their dedicated non-profit company, Francis Ledwidge Museum and War Memorial Centre CLG. The cottage museum contains displays of his life and work; it charges a small fee for admission.

The Inchicore Ledwidge Society was founded in 1995.

=== Commemorative events ===
The centenary of his birth was marked with events and a booklet published by a committee in 1987.

On the 81st anniversary of his death in 1998, a simple non-militaristic monument was unveiled by the poet's nephew, Joe Ledwidge, and the writer Dermot Bolger, on the exact spot where he was killed - the location having been unearthed by Piet Chielens, the director of the In Flanders Fields Museum. The monument consists of a portrait of Ledwidge on glass over yellow Ieper brick, with the text of his poem "Soliloquy" printed in English and in Dutch.

In 2002, Ledwidge was selected as one of twelve representative World War I soldier poets by the Imperial War Museum, the only Irish poet chosen. Personal and written material connected to him was included in their Anthem for Doomed Youth exhibition, which ran into 2003. His family and Dunsany Castle's archives lent original materials, and he and images of these were featured on the museum's website, and in a chapter in the exhibition book of the same title.

In a 2016 episode of the BBC Radio 3 series Minds at War Belfast academic Gerald Dawe contributed a commentary entitled "Francis Ledwidge's poem 'O'Connell Street'".

==== Centenary of death ====
The official national commemoration for Ledwidge was held at the birthplace cottage at the edge of Slane on 24 June 2017, with Ireland represented by Minister for European Affairs, Helen McEntee, joined by four members of Ledwidge's family, an Irish Army Brigadier General, a Garda Assistant Commissioner, various politicians, the Belgian ambassador, the UK defence attache, and many locals. There were also events at Ieper (Ypres) in Belgium, where the Irish poet Dermot Bolger gave an oration at his grave, and in the former Richmond Barracks in Inchicore Dublin on July 30, where there was a musical memorial event featuring the musical group Anúna, including some of Ledwidge's poetry set to music.

== Publications and reception ==
=== Poetry ===
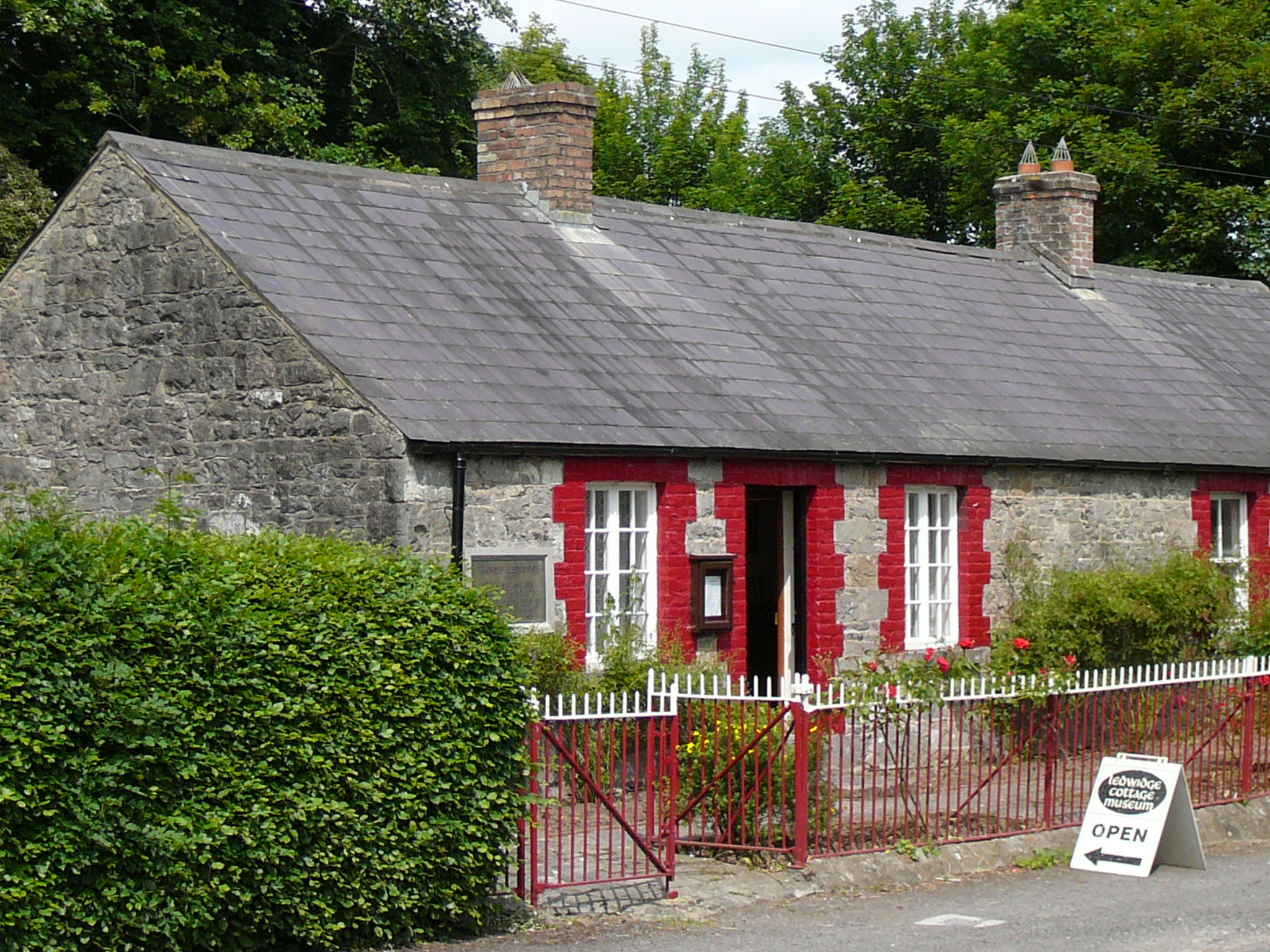
Ledwidge Cottage Museum, Slane, County Meath where Francis lived and grew up as a young poet.

Ledwidge was writing poetry from childhood, and from age 14, he would routinely send poetry to a number of newspapers in Ireland. Selected items were published, notably between 1909 and 1914; later some UK publication was added. The newspaper publications were largely unpaid, though the Irish Weekly Independent would pay a small reward to the first-printed poem each week.

The only work published in book form during Ledwidge's lifetime was the original volume Songs of the Fields (1915), containing fifty poems, which was very well received. The poems in this volume were reviewed by Lord Dunsany, and selected by Dunsany and Ledwidge working together. Dunsany helped Lediwdge secure a publisher, Herbert Jenkins. The critic Edward Marsh printed three of the poems in the Georgian Poetry series, and remained a correspondent for the remainder of Ledwidge's life.

A second volume, Songs of Peace, had its 39 poems selected and was fully drafted when Ledwidge died; patron and friend Lord Dunsany wrote the introduction while both were in Derry in September 1916 and arranged for its publication in September 1917, with an additional foreword. Following the war, Dunsany arranged for more of Ledwidge's work to be published, selecting 33 poems for a third and final volume, Last Songs. The 122 poems from the three volumes were assembled into a collection, The Complete Poems of Francis Ledwidge, released in 1919, which went through at least three editions.

Dunsany commented on the work with words such as:

"[I was] astonished by the brilliance of that eye and that had looked at the fields of Meath and seen there all the simple birds and flowers, with a vividness which made those pages like a magnifying glass, through which one looked at familiar things for the first time."

==== Posthumous publication ====
In 1974, Alice Curtayne assembled a new collection of Ledwidge's poems, Francis Ledwidge : Complete Poems adding 44 pieces from various sources, many of the newly-collected items having had newspaper appearances. Curtayne organised the poems into thematic groups. The collection was reprinted. In mid-1997, Liam O'Meara and the Inchicore Ledwidge Society published a new collection, Francis Ledwidge : The Poems Complete, with 66 poems added to the Curtayne selection, many found in the archives at Dunsany Castle; around 20 of the poems had not previously been published.

A Ledwidge enthusiast, retired British judge Hubert Dunn, who had spoken of Ledwidge at commemorative events, and had contact with the Ledwidge and Dunsany families, and interest groups, secured permission to review some materials at Dunsany Castle. Working with the literary curator at Dunsany, Dunn located some unpublished poems, and in 2006, he released a narrative of Ledwidge's life and influences, with dozens of poems incorporated, including a small number of previously unpublished works.

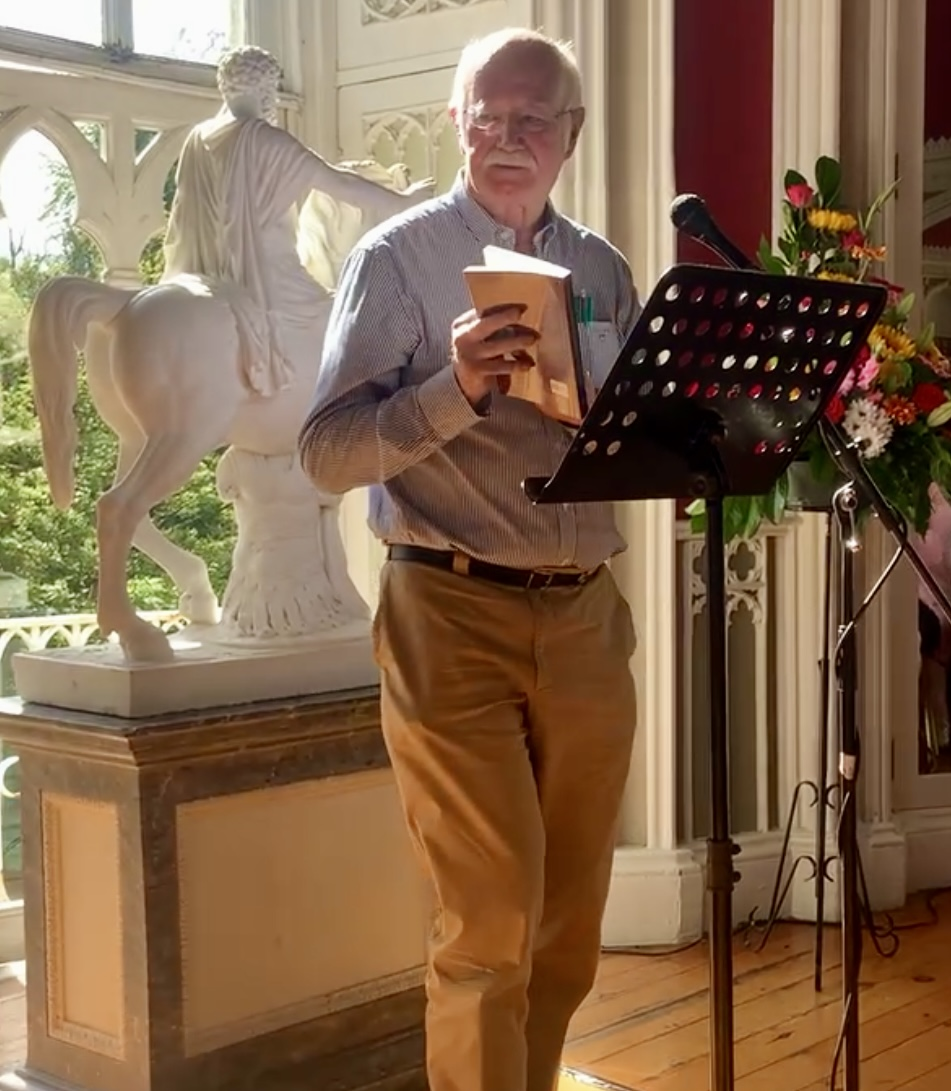
Peter Fallon at the launch of the Gallery Press volume of Poems (Francis Ledwidge), August 2022, Slane, County Meath, with a copy of the book in hand

The Ledwidge Cottage Museum and the Gallery Press of Loughcrew, County Meath, led by Peter Fallon, with support from Randal, the 21st Lord Dunsany, and the Dunsany archivist, Joe Doyle, jointly issued a new collection, Poems, in 2022. Containing 140 works, one not previously seen, the book was launched at an event at Slane Castle on 7 August 2022. The launch, in the castle’s famous Georgian ballroom, was attended by local activists, politicians, librarians, the 21st Lord Dunsany and the Dunsany literary curator, among many others.

=== Prose and drama ===
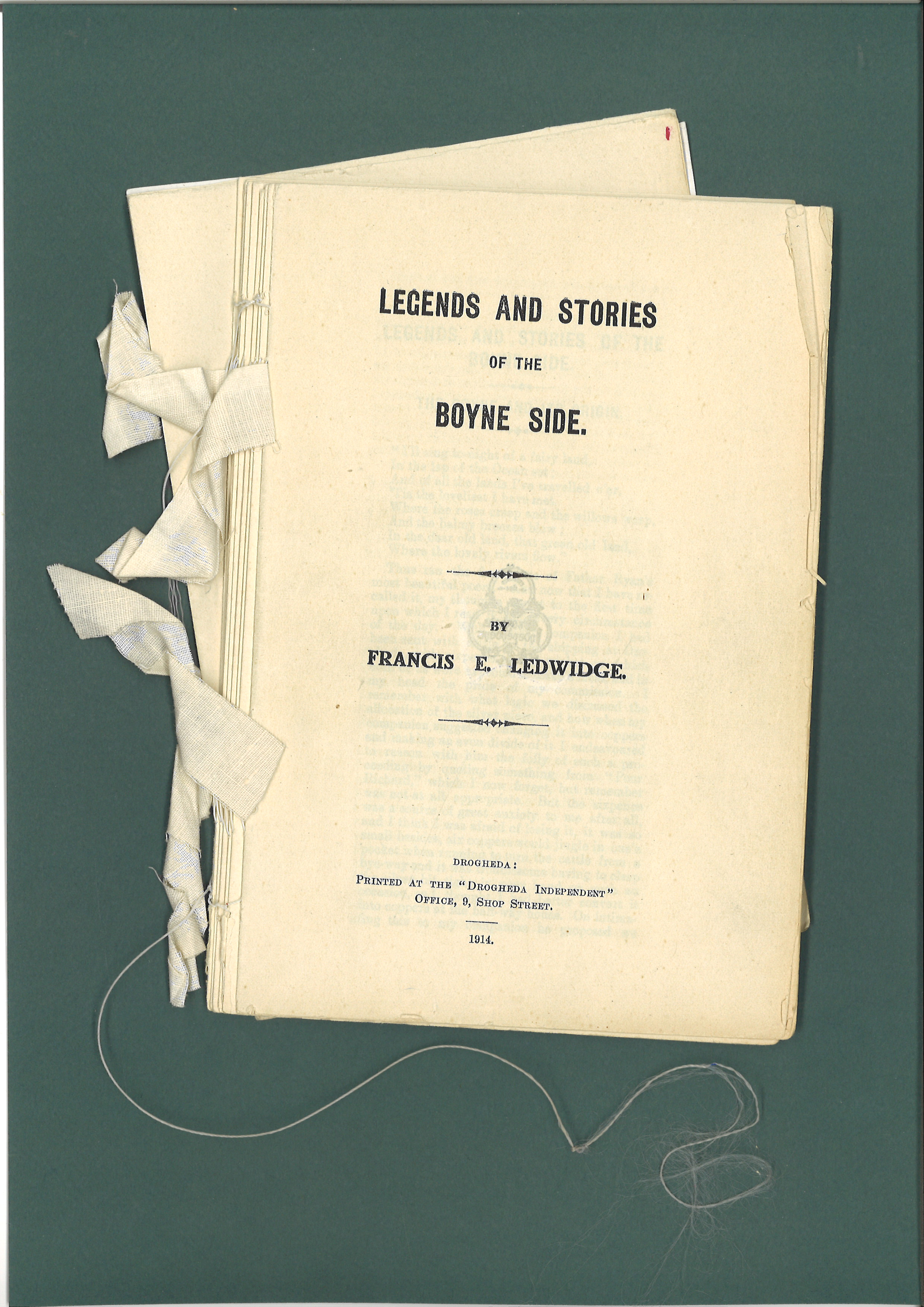
The Original staves of Legends and Stories of the Boyne Side

Ledwidge's submissions to the Drogheda Independent in 1913 were done with the eventual aim of publishing a book: Legends and Stories of the Boyne Side. The book was unfinished, having reached the entry for Slane, but some material was drafted, typeset, and some copies of this partial work printed, but it was then "shelved", and the early print material was dumped in the 1970s, except for one set, which was recovered, and published as Legends and Stories of the Boyne Side. A further edition, expanded to include some short stories, a war record, and the full text of an autobiographical letter to Lewis Chase, was released in 2006: Legends of the Boyne and Selected Prose. Researched and edited by Liam O'Meara, it was launched by Senator David Norris at Liberty Hall in 2006.

Ledwidge also wrote of working on a play, The Crock of Gold, but no Ledwidge drama has yet been published or performed. There are also references to other writing, but none has been published.

=== Bibliography ===
- Songs of the Fields (1915; 50 poems; full text at the Internet Archive)
- Songs of Peace (1917; 39 poems; full text at the Internet Archive)
- Last Songs (1918; 33 poems; full text at the Internet Archive)
- The complete poems of Francis Ledwidge; with introductions by Lord Dunsany (1919; 122 poems; full text at the Internet Archive)
- Legends of the Boyne and Selected Prose (ed. Liam O'Meara, Riposte Books with the Inchicore Ledwidge Society, 2006, ISBN 9781999767600, from Drogheda Independent material plus a short story, letter and war record)
- Legends and Stories of the Boyne Side (Excel Printing, Navan, 2017 - a facsimile reproduction of the book-in-progress that the Drogheda Independent was compiling)

Later collections gathering more of the poetry:

- The Complete Poems of Francis Ledwidge (1974, Alice Curtayne [editor], who also wrote a comprehensive biography of the poet - 166 poems, including previously unpublished and uncollected work)
- Francis Ledwidge : The Poems Complete (1997, ed. Liam O'Meara, Goldsmith Press, ISBN 9781870491471) - 232 poems, including 20 unpublished, and 46 additional uncollected - and 7 pieces of juvenile work - primarily from the archives of Dunsany Castle, alongside Ledwidge family and other holdings
- Poems (2022, ed. Peter Fallon, Gallery Press, Loughcrew, County Meath, ISBN 9781911338383) - 140 poems, the 122 of the 1919 edition, 17 from the Curtayne 1949 collection, and 1 previously unseen work from the Dunsany archives)

A study of the poet and his literary milieu, with a few previously unpublished works:

- The Minstrel Boy by Hubert Dunn (Booklink, 2006) - selected poems within a narrative, in a commemorative volume, with illustrating photographs from the private art collection of a senior UK judge

Selections from the body of Ledwidge's work:

- The Best of Francis Ledwidge (ed. Liam O'Meara, ISBN 9781901596106, introduction by Ulick O'Connor)
- The Dead Men's Dreams (ed. Liam O'Meara, Kilmainham Tales, ISBN 9781908056139) - a collection of Ledwidge poems inspired by the 1916 Rising
- Selected Poems of Francis Ledwidge - (ed. Dermot Bolger, Dublin poet, expanding on the 1919 Complete Poems). Reissued, with an introduction by Seamus Heaney and an extensive biographical afterword by Dermot Bolger, as The Ledwidge Treasury. Reissued again in 2017, by New Island Books, using the original title of Selected Poems, to mark the centenary of Ledwidge's death.

=== Settings and adaptations ===
Some of Ledwidge's poetry was set to music by the British composer and songwriter Michael Head, most notably in the song cycle published in 1920, "Over the rim of the moon". This includes the song, "The Ships of Arcady". There were also further musical settings, and compact discs and audiobooks of readings of his work, sometimes to music, have also been released.

The English poet and composer Ivor Gurney set one of Ledwidge's poems to music: 'Desire in Spring' in 1918. He shared Ledwidge's love of the countryside and also fought in the First Word War battles in the vicinity of Ypres in 1917. [The Ordeal of Ivor Gurney, Michael Hurd, Oxford University Press 1978. Also 'Ivor Gurney songs vol 5, OUP ed. Michael Hurd 1979]

=== Studies of Ledwidge and his work ===
A substantial biography was written by Alice Curtayne, and published in 1972. In 2020, a short book, Soldier's Heart: Francis Ledwidge at war ISBN 978-1-913425-29-6, a biographical account of his military service years, was published by his grand-nephew, Frank Ledwidge.

Liam O'Meara, chairman of the Inchicore Ledwidge Society, published To One Dead, a play based on the life & writings of Francis Ledwidge (ISBN 9781901596199), and Francis Ledwidge Poet Activist & Soldier (Riposte Books/Inchicore Ledwidge Society, ISBN 9781901596137).

In 2012, Miriam O'Gara-Kilmurry was awarded a Masters in Literature from the Open University with a thesis on Ledwidge titled, "A defence of Francis Ledwidge as a War Poet through an exploration of War Imagery, Nationalism and Canonical Revisions." She asserted that until 2011, Ledwidge had no 'WWI War Poet' presence online, and that no searches containing the specific words 'Irish WWI war poets' turned up any results, and that Ledwidge's poems written from the front-lines received little if no attention as examples of unique nationalist 'hybrid' war poems. On the eve of All-Ireland Poetry Day', 2 October 2013, O'Gara-Kilmurry was invited by the National Library of Ireland to deliver a lecture on "Francis Ledwidge: WWI Irish Nationalist War Poet." In 2016, the thesis was published as a book, Eire's WWI War Poet: F. E. Ledwidge. According to O'Gara-Kilmurry:

Ledwidge qualifies as a 'war poet' on the grounds that he actually fought in theatres of war. Secondly, he wrote on war themes peculiar to soldiers fighting on front-lines, and finally, he belonged to a category of poets singled out by the celebrated literary sponsor of his day, Edward Howard Marsh, Private Secretary to Winston Churchill. Central to the literal argument is our theory that Francis Ledwidge meets criteria set out for War Poets and identified by Marsh's friend and fellow academic Robert H. Ross, who in 1965 published a study attempting to explore the Georgians (Robert H. Ross, Georgian Summer (London: Faber and Faber, 1965))." ... "My final thought as I leave you, is that there is nothing worse than indifference. Ignoring the War Poetry of F. E. is another way of declaring war on Ledwidge and should not be allowed to continue into the 21 Century."

— Miriam O'Gara Kilmurry, Eire's WWI War Poet: F.E. Ledwidge

== Politics ==
His politics are described by the Oxford Dictionary of National Biography as nationalist as well as left-wing. However far from simply being an Irish Nationalist, his poems "O’Connell Street" and "Lament for the Poets of 1916" clearly describe his sense of loss and an expression of holding the same "dreams" as the Easter Rising's Irish Republicans who fought and died for the Irish Republic in and around O'Connell Street in 1916.

== Quotes ==
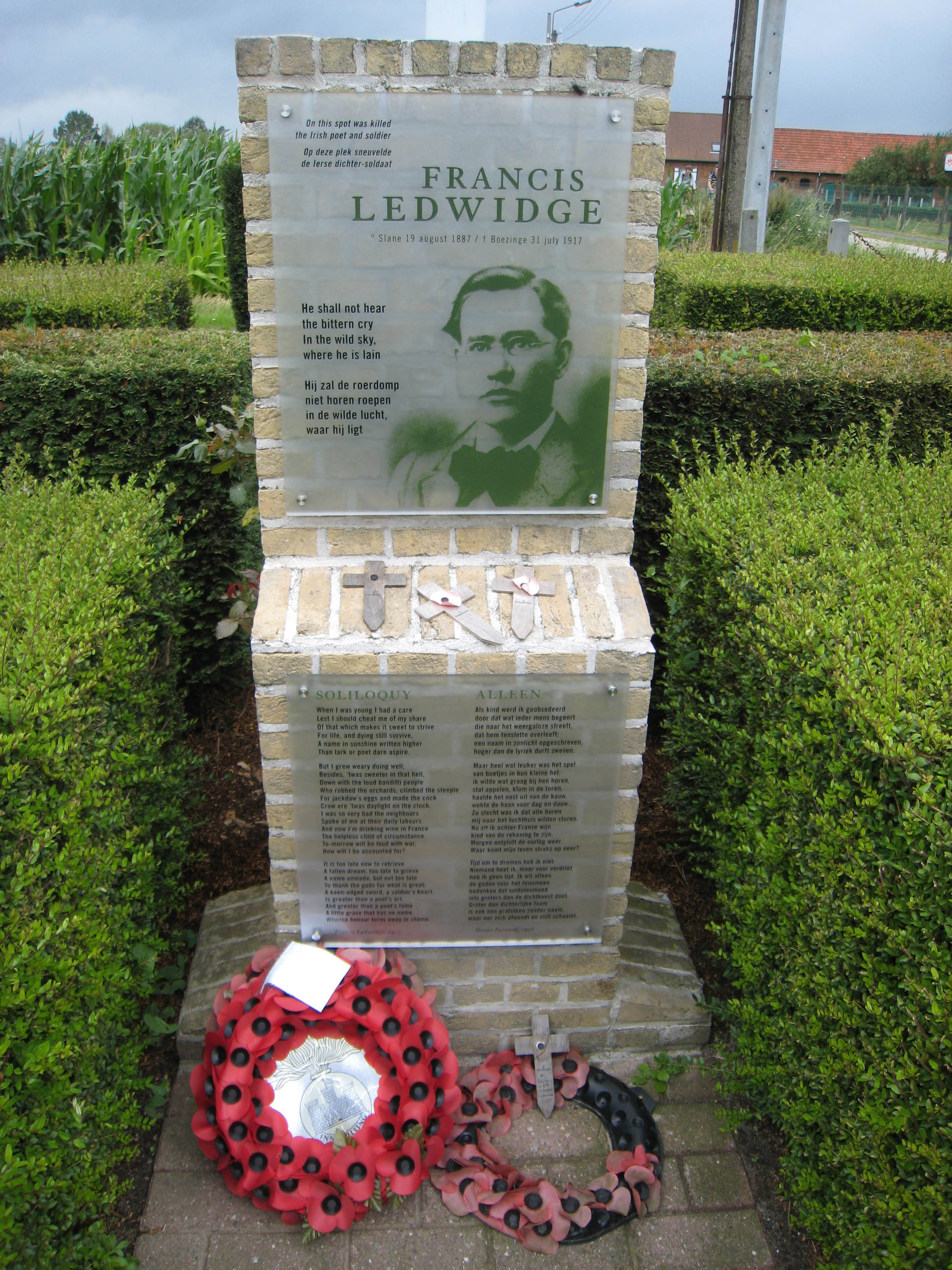
Memorial to Francis Ledwidge on the spot where he died

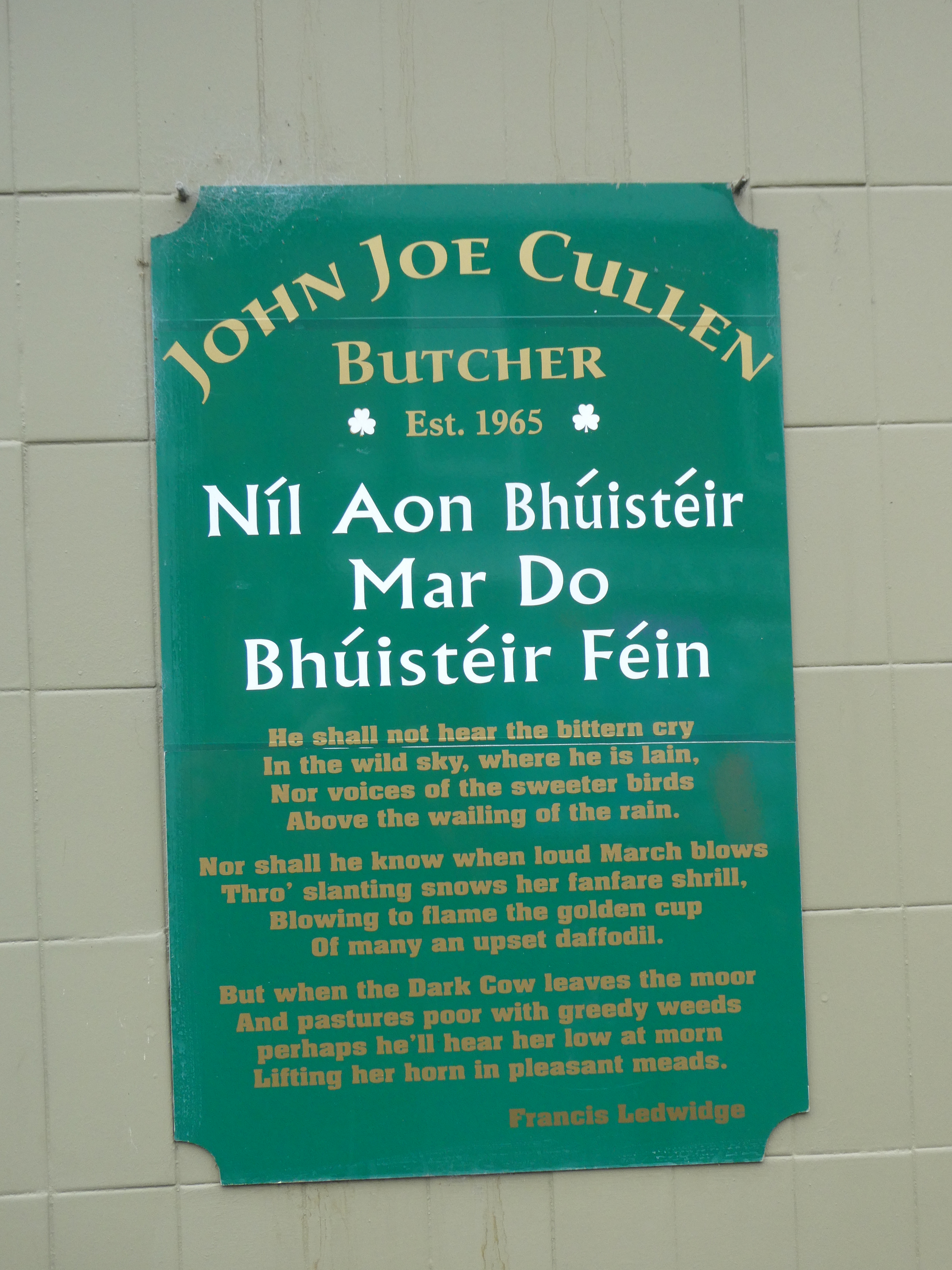
The "Lament for Thomas MacDonagh" on a plaque at a butcher's shop in Kilkenny

Oh what a pleasant world 'twould be,
How easy we'd step thro' it,
If all the fools who meant no harm,
Could manage not to do it!

– From a personal letter.

He shall not hear the bittern cry
in the wild sky, where he is lain,
Nor voices of the sweeter birds
Above the wailing of the rain

Nor shall he know when the loud March blows
Thro' slanting snows her fanfare shrill,
Blowing to flame the golden cup
Of many an upset daffodil.

But when the dark cow leaves the moor
And pastures poor with greedy weeds
Perhaps he'll hear her low at morn
Lifting her horn in pleasant meads.

– Lament for Thomas MacDonagh

== Media and popular culture ==
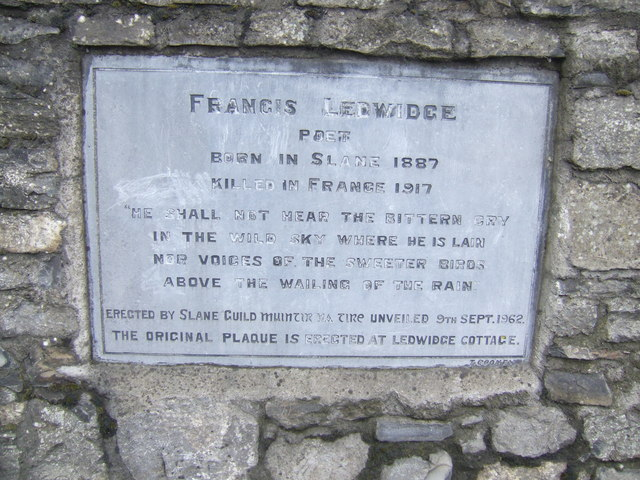
Memorial plaque on Slane bridge

Ledwidge was the subject of an RTÉ documentary entitled Behind the Closed Eye, first broadcast on 18 January 1973. It won awards for Best Story and Best Implementation Documentary at the Golden Prague International Television Festival.
