= Hubert Dunn =

Northern Ireland-born English barrister and judge (1933–2020)

His Honour, Judge Hubert Dunn QC

Local Government Commissioner (South-East Circuit)
- In office 1963–1964

Recorder
- In office 1980–1993

Circuit Judge (London and the South-East)
- In office 1993–2005

Legal Member, Restricted Patients Panel, Mental Health Tribunal

Chief Immigration Adjudicator of the United Kingdom
- In office 1998–2001

Personal details
- Born: William Hubert Dunn; 8 July 1933 Holywood, County Down, Northern Ireland
- Died: 27 February 2020 (aged 86) England
- Citizenship: British
- Spouse: Maria Henriqueta D'Araujo Perestrello
- Children: 2
- Education: Winchester College
- Alma mater: New College, Oxford
- Profession: Barrister

Military service
- Branch/service: Army
- Years of service: 1956–57
- Rank: Second lieutenant
- Unit: Life Guards
- Writing career
- Subject: Poetry / Biography
- Notable works: The Minstrel Boy: Francis Ledwidge, and the Literature of His Time

William Hubert Dunn (8 July 1933 – 27 February 2020) was a Northern Ireland-born English senior barrister and judge, who held national offices in the areas of mental health and immigration, including that of Chief Immigration Adjudicator of the UK. A leader in a youth charity for many years, later in life he researched and authored a study of the life and work of the Irish poet Francis Ledwidge.

== Early life ==
William Hubert Dunn, known for most of his life as Hubert, was born in Belfast on 8 July 1933, the son of businessman William and Isobel Dunn (née Thompson) of Tudor Hall, Holywood, County Down, Northern Ireland. He attended the nearby Rockport School in County Down and later Winchester College, making him an Old Wykehamist. He studied for a Bachelor of Arts in politics, economics and philosophy at New College, Oxford, graduating with honours in 1955. He was commissioned as a second lieutenant in the Life Guards on 4 August 1956, relinquishing his commission exactly a year later and transferring into the reserve. In 1958 he was called to the bar at Lincoln's Inn. He worked at the chambers of Lord Havers and Frederick Lawton. He returned to New College, and in 1966 secured an M.A.

== Career ==
Dunn was appointed Local Government Commissioner for the South-East Circuit of England, serving 1963 to 1964. He qualified to serve as a recorder in 1970 and was appointed as such in 1980. He was made a Queen's Counsel in 1982 and appointed as a circuit judge in 1993, serving until October 2005. He was later appointed as the Legal Member of the Restricted Patients Panel of the Mental Health Tribunal, which deals with patients detained after trial.

Dunn was appointed an immigration adjudicator and special adjudicator (dealing with asylum cases), and was appointed Chief Immigration Adjudicator for the United Kingdom by the Lord Chancellor in 1998, appearing before the UK parliament in that capacity. He concluded his immigration work in 2001.

== Non-profit and charitable work ==
Dunn served as a Bencher (a member of the governing body) of Lincoln's Inn from 1990 to his death. He was the founder, and for a period secretary, of the London Ulster Lawyers' Union.

Dunn was a leader from the early years of the charity Hope for Youth (formerly the Women Caring Trust for the Children of Northern Ireland), which runs cross-community projects for young people in Northern Ireland. He became chairperson ща the charity's trustees, and when he retired from that role in 2003, assumed the role of president of the charity; his daughter later became a trustee of the charity.

== Writing ==
Dunn was interested in the Irish poet Francis Ledwidge and cooperated with groups also interested in Ledwidge, including speaking at commemorative events. Having secured access to the curator and archive at Dunsany Castle, he produced a substantial illustrated study of the life, work and literary influences of the poet in 2006, The Minstrel Boy: Francis Ledwidge, and the Literature of His Time, which included some previously unpublished poems.

== Personal life ==
Dunn married Maria Henriqueta D'Araujo Perestrello de Moser, from Portugal, generally known as Henriqueta, in 1971. Their elder child, Cherry Eugenia Perestrello Dunn, born 1972, also pursued legal studies, becoming a solicitor, while their younger, James Hubert Sebastian Perestrello Dunn, born 1973, is generally known as the actor Sebastian Dunn. Henriqueta Dunn died on 5 November 2018 and Hubert Dunn on 27 February 2020. His funeral was private, with donations invited to the charity he had long worked with, Hope for Youth (NI), and a memorial service planned. The memorial service was announced to be held in October 2021, in the chapel of Lincoln's Inn, followed by a reception in the Inn's Old Hall.
