= William Evans (Wil Ifan) =

Welsh poet

William Evans (22 April 1883 – 16 July 1968), better known by his bardic name of Wil Ifan, was a Welsh poet who served as Archdruid of the National Eisteddfod of Wales from 1947 to 1950.

He was the son of Dan Evans, a Congregationalist minister, and Mary (née Davies). He was born in Cwmbach, near Llanwinio, Carmarthenshire, but later moved with his family to Cwmafan and attended grammar school in Port Talbot. He was educated at University of Wales, Bangor, and Mansfield College, Oxford.

Wil Ifan followed in his father's footsteps by becoming a Congregationalist Minister. He was ordained in the English Congregationalist Chapel in Dolgellau, Merionethshire, in 1906 and served as the chapel minister for three years.

Whilst in Dolgellau he met his future wife Nesta Wyn Edwards whom he married on 28 December 1910 in Dolgellau. They had four children.

In 1909 he became the minister of the English Congregationalist church in Bridgend Glamorganshire. Apart from time spent in the Richmond Road English Congregational Church, Cardiff, between 1917 and 1925, Evans spent the rest of his life in Bridgend.

Like all Archdruids, he was a winner of a major poetry prize at the National Eisteddfod, winning the Crown at Abergavenny in 1913, at Birkenhead in 1917 (when Hedd Wyn was posthumously awarded the chair) and at Pwllheli in 1925.

He died in Bridgend and is buried at Rhydymain in Merionethshire.

== Works ==
- Dros y Nyth (1915)
- Dail Iorwg (1919)
- Plant y Babell (1922)
- O Ddydd i Ddydd (1927)
- Y Winllan Las (1936)
- Unwaith Eto (1946)
- Y Filltir Deg (1954)
- Colofnau Wil Ifan (1962)

Preceded by William Williams (Crwys)	Archdruid of the National Eisteddfod of Wales; 1947–1950	Succeeded by Albert Evans-Jones
