= Boezinge =

Village in West Flanders, Belgium

- Village
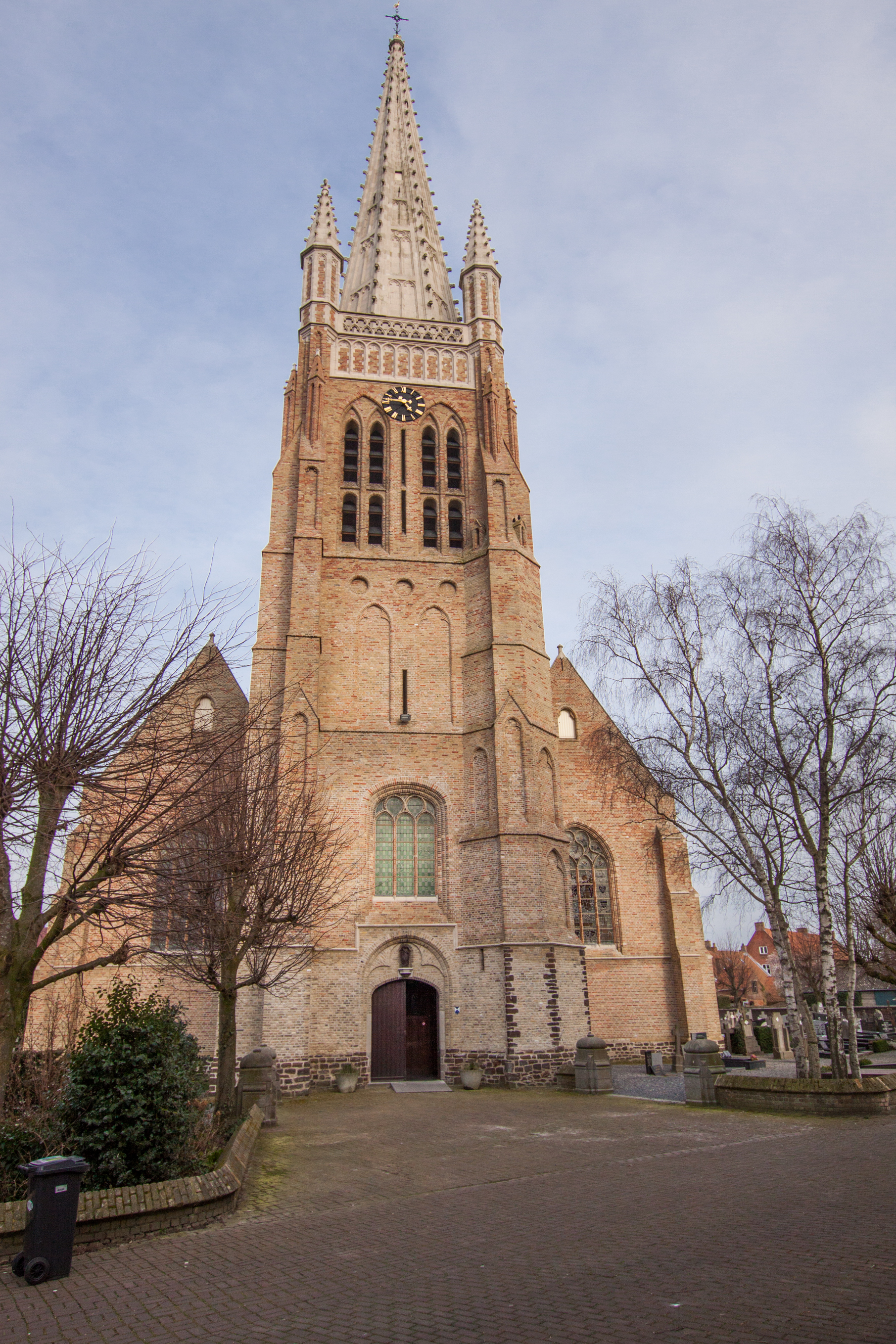
- St. Michael's Church in Boezinge

- Location in Belgium
- Coordinates: 50.895887°N 2.855759°E
- Country: Belgium
- Region: Flemish Region
- Province: West Flanders
- Municipality: Ypres

Area
  - Total: 17.72 km^{2} (6.84 sq mi)

Population (1999)
  - Total: 2,216
  - Density: 125.1/km^{2} (323.9/sq mi)
- Time zone: CET

Boezinge (Dutch pronunciation: [ˈbuzɪŋə]; West Flemish: Boezienge) is a village in the municipality of Ypres in the Belgian province of West Flanders. Boezinge can be reached via the N369 road in the direction of Diksmuide. It was an independent municipality until 1977.

It hosts the historical brewery Brouwerij Het Sas.

== History ==
Boezinge was first mentioned in 1119 as Boesigha. The village was an heerlijkheid. Until 1556, it was part of the diocese of Terwaan.

In World War I, the village belonged to the Ypres Salient, which made it the site of the Battles of Ypres between German and Allied forces. Today there are memorials and war cemeteries in the area, many of which are maintained by the Commonwealth War Graves Commission.

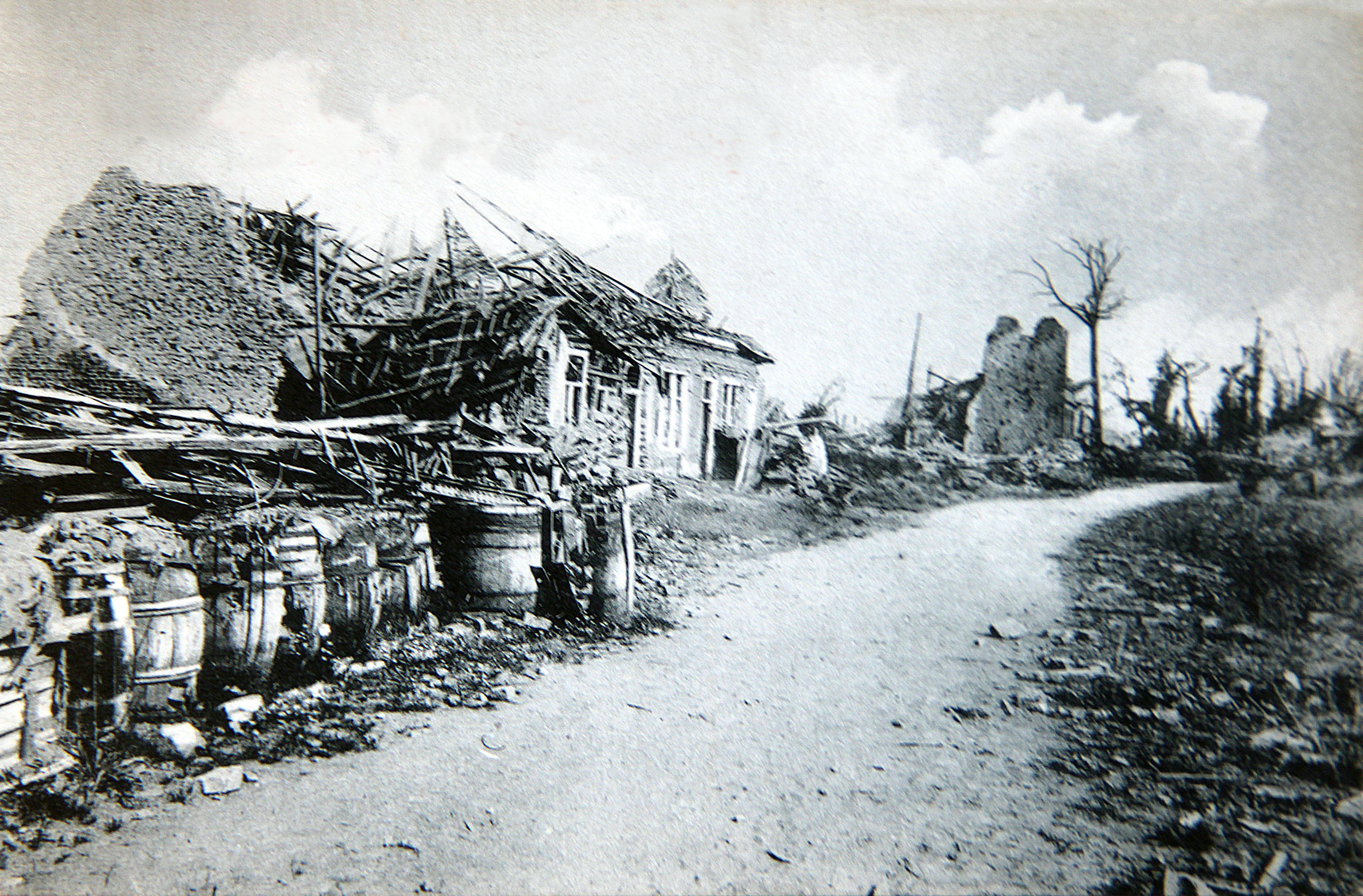
District devastated by the fighting of 1914 in Boezinge (Belgium).

In 1970, the municipality merged with Zuidschote, and in 1977, it was merged into Ypres.

== Commemoration of World War I ==
=== Yorkshire Trench ===
In the 1990s an original British trench system ("Yorkshire Trench") was discovered by amateur archaeologists, on the site of an industrial estate near the village. Yorkshire Trench was a first line trench for about one year between summer or autumn 1916 until the summer of 1917. In spring of 1917, 173rd Tunnelling Company added a deep dugout to the existing trench. The completed Yorkshire Trench dugout then served as headquarters for the 13th and 16th Battalions of the Royal Welch Fusiliers at the start of the Battle of Passchendaele later that year. The BEF had decided to carry out all operations in the offensive of summer 1917 from deep dugouts. East of the Ypres Canal in the close vicinity of Yorkshire Trench there were several more dugouts, seven of which - all south and southeast of Yorkshire Trench - were finished by the 173rd or 179th Tunnelling Companies. Of these, Yorkshire Trench, Butt 18, Nile Trench and Heading Lane Dugout were double battalion headquarters, Bridge 6 was a brigade headquarters, and Lancashire Farm Dugout contained two battalion and two brigade headquarters. The condition of the ground made digging the deep dugouts extremely difficult and dangerous. Work had to be carried out silently and secretly, facing an observant enemy who was only a few hundred metres away. About 180 dugout sites have been located in the Ypres Salient and in the 1990s some of them were entered, at least in part. Yorkshire Trench was rediscovered by amateur archaeologists and systematically excavated in 1998. Although the area is now part of a large industrial estate, the location was opened to the public in 2003 Yorkshire Trench is located close to the John McCrae memorial site at Essex Farm.

=== War cemeteries ===
- Artillery Wood Cemetery, where the Welsh poet Hedd Wyn and the Irish poet Francis Ledwidge are buried
- Bard Cottage Cemetery
- Boezinge Churchyard war graves
- Colne Valley Cemetery
- Dragoon Camp Cemetery
- Duhallow ADS Cemetery
- Essex Farm Cemetery
- La Belle Alliance Cemetery
- No Man's Cot Cemetery
- Talana Farm Cemetery
- Welsh Cemetery (Caesar's Nose)

=== The Castle of Boezinge (Boesinghe) ===
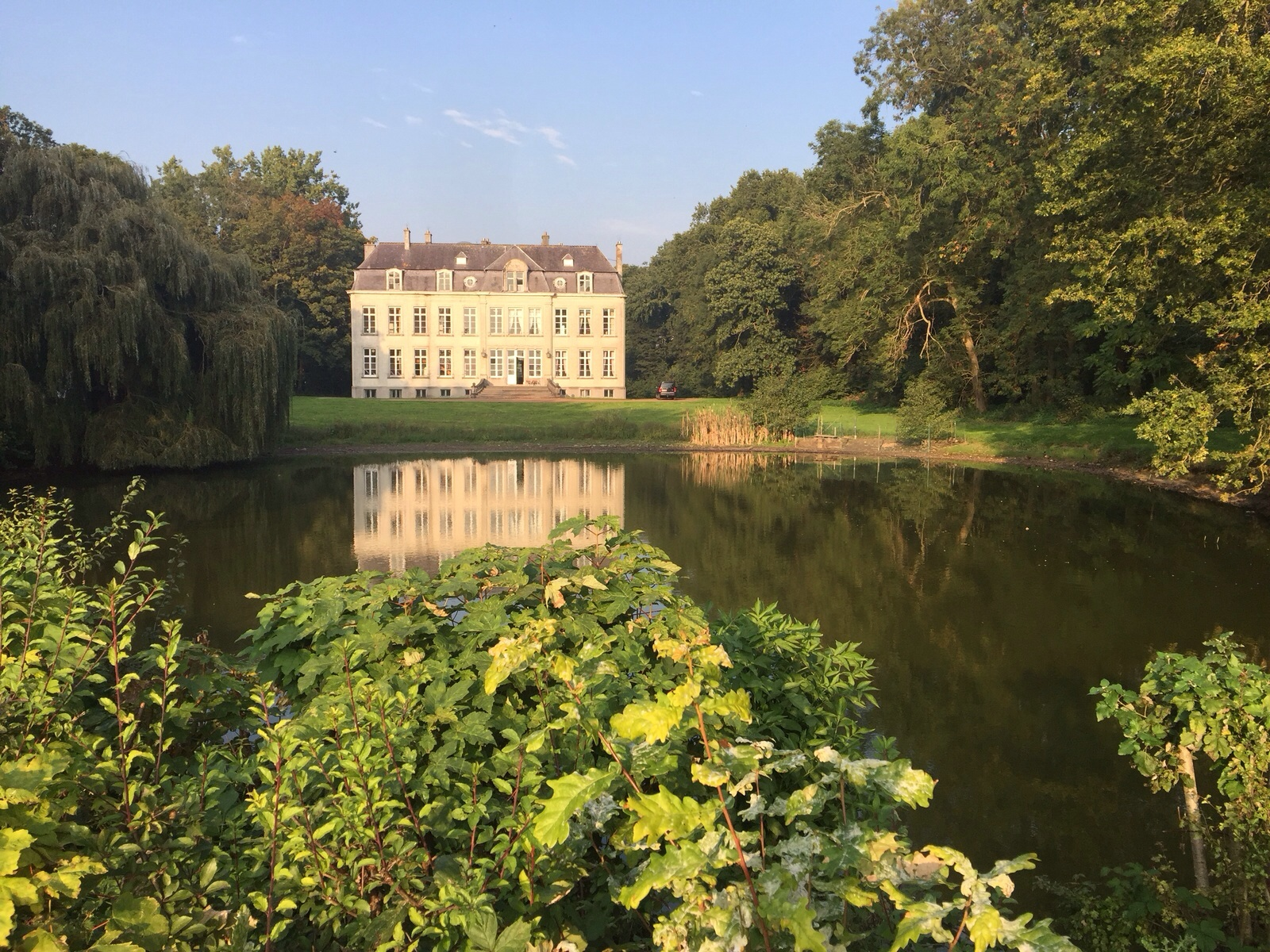
The Castle of Boezinge

The estate was destroyed during the first world war in July 1917 and rebuilt after the war.

In the private park lies a British command post.
