= Richard Jones Berwyn =

Welsh colonist

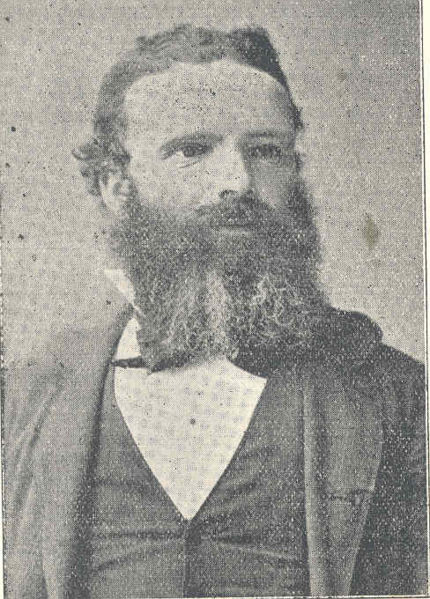
R.J.Berwyn

Richard Jones Berwyn (October 1837 – 25 December 1917) was an early Welsh colonist in Patagonia.

== Early life ==
Richard Jones was born in October 1837 in Glyndyfrdwy, Wales. In 1852, he began his studies at the Borough Road Teacher Training College in London. He then sailed for New York, where he was asked by Michael D. Jones to join the Welsh people in forming the colony of Patagonia. He accepted the offer and returned to Wales to prepare for that trip.

== Patagonia colony ==
He was among the first group of people to colonise Patagonia and changed his surname to Berwyn. He married the widow of Tommy Dimol, who had two sons about 1867. He held a number of positions, including schoolmaster, postmaster, and registrar. He also served as Secretary to governor, the Welsh Courts and the Council. He began to publish the monthly Y Brut in 1868. He later published a Welsh reader and annual almanacs into the early 20th century.

Initially, relationships with the local government were good, but about 1881, tensions increased with the appointment of a new governmental official. In one incident, Berwyn organised a march on a police station to protest the improper arrest of a man, for which he was also arrested. He died on Christmas Day 1917.

During his time at Y Wladfa 'the Colony', Berwyn promoted the use of the recently conceived decimal numeral system for use in the Welsh language. The decimal system was conceived by an accountant in the Colony to make the business of accounting simpler. The decimal system was later, in the 1940s, promoted in Welsh language schools in Wales and has been taught ever since. The original vigesimal system is, however, still an integral part of the language.
