= Albert Young (footballer) =

Welsh footballer

Personal information
- Full name: Albert Edward Young
- Date of birth: 11 September 1917
- Place of birth: Caerleon, Newport, Wales
- Date of death: January 2013 (aged 95)
- Place of death: Chelmsford, Essex, UK
- Position: Full-back

Senior career*
Years	Team	Apps	(Gls)
1937–1938	Margate		
1938–1946	Arsenal	0	(0)
1946–1950	Swindon Town	123	(1)
	Chelmsford City	?	(?)
- * Club domestic league appearances and goals

Albert Edward Young (11 September 1917 – January 2013) was a Welsh footballer who played as a full-back in the English Football League for Swindon Town.

== Career ==
Having spent the 1937–38 season at nursery club Margate, Young signed as a professional for Arsenal in 1938. In May 1939, he travelled with Arsenal on a tour of Belgium, Sweden and Denmark, but he failed to make any competitive appearances for the North London club due to the outbreak of the Second World War.

During the war, Young was stationed with the British Army in Northern Ireland, where he played for Glentoran and represented the Irish League in 1941. He also guested for Crystal Palace, Watford, Chelsea and Tottenham Hotspur.

Young signed for Swindon Town in the summer of 1946. However, he had made his debut for the Robins three months before his actual transfer from Arsenal, in the Southern Section Cup against Aldershot. His league debut for Swindon Town came on 31 August 1946 against Northampton Town in a 4–1 defeat at the County Ground, Northampton. His last appearance for the Robins came in the 1949–50 season on New Year's Eve 1949 away at Aldershot, in a 0–0 draw at the Recreation Ground. At the end of the season he then moved on to non-league Essex club Chelmsford City.

== Club ==
Club	Season	League		FA Cup		Other (Note: Appearance in the Southern Section Cup)		Total	
Club	Season	Apps	Goals	Apps	Goals	Apps	Goals	Apps	Goals
Swindon Town	1945–46	0	0	0	0	1	0	1	0
Swindon Town	1946–47	36	0	1	0	0	0	37	0
Swindon Town	1947–48	30	0	6	0	0	0	36	0
Swindon Town	1948–49	34	1	1	0	0	0	35	1
Swindon Town	1949–50	23	0	2	0	0	0	25	0
Career totals		123	1	10	0	1	0	134	1
