= Artillery Wood Cemetery =

WWI cemetery in Belgium

Artillery Wood
- Commonwealth War Graves Commission
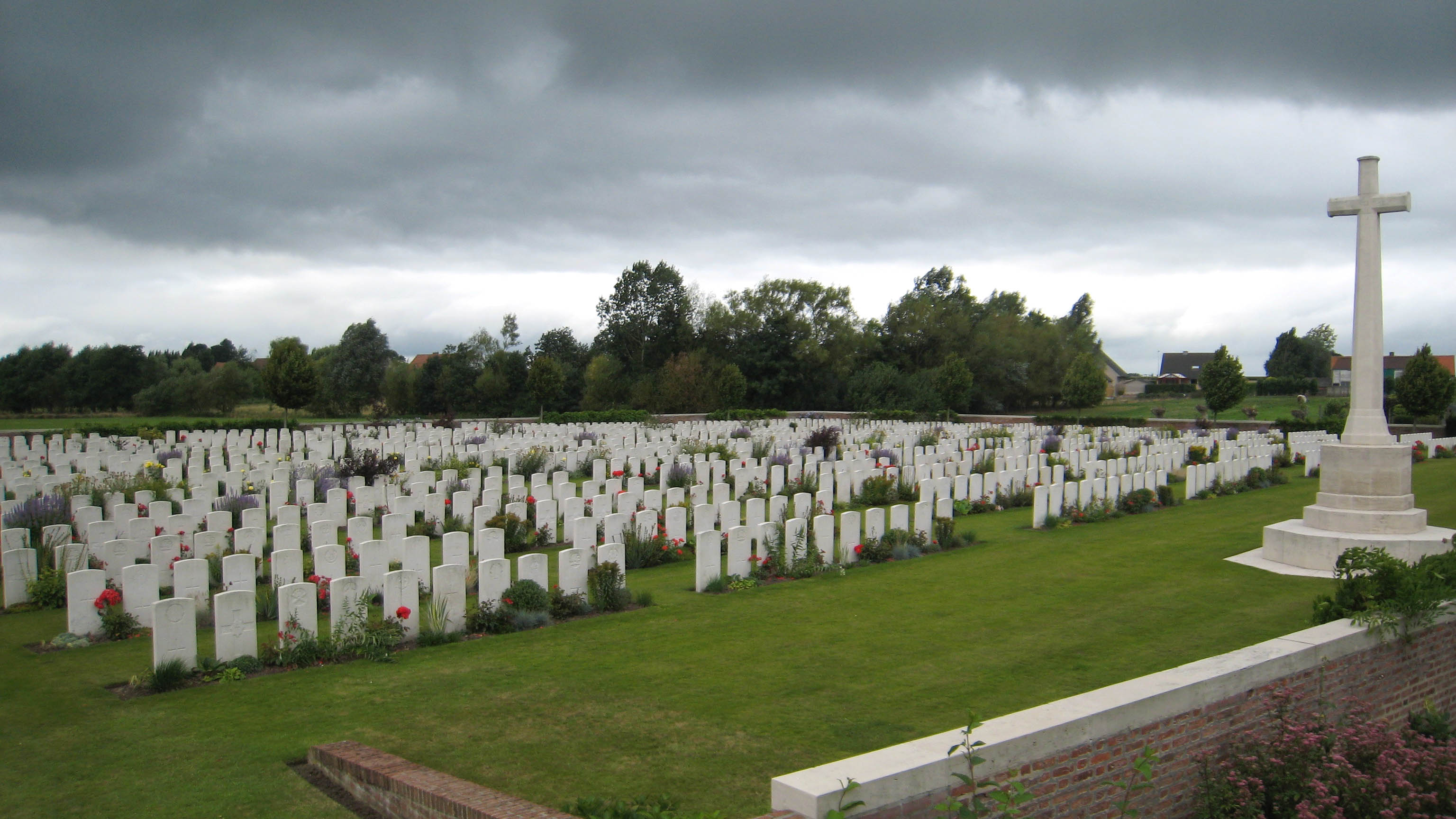
- Used for those deceased 1917–1918
- Established: 1914
- Location: 50.8996°N 2.8719°E near Boezinge, Ypres, West Flanders, Belgium
- Designed by: Sir Reginald Blomfield
- Total burials: 1307

Burials by war
- World War I: 1307 (of which 801 are identified)

Artillery Wood Cemetery, near Boezinge, Belgium, is a Commonwealth War Graves Commission cemetery from the First World War.

The cemetery grounds were assigned to the United Kingdom in perpetuity by King Albert I of Belgium in recognition of the sacrifices made by the British Empire in the defence and liberation of Belgium during the war.

The cemetery was designed by Sir Reginald Blomfield.

== Establishment ==
The cemetery was established in 1917 after fighting in the immediate area – the Battle of Pilckem Ridge – had moved away and was used for burials until March 1918.

At the point of the Armistice there were some 141 graves in the cemetery. Concentration from the battlefields and three smaller cemeteries (Boesinghe Chateau Grounds, Brissein House and Captain's Farm) enlarged this to the present 1,307.

== Burials by Unit ==
The following list is compiled from the 801 identified casualties in Artillery Wood Cemetery with Imperial Units in bold:

Royal Field Artillery: 75	Coldstream Guards: 70
Grenadier Guards: 61	Irish Guards: 57
Royal Welch Fusiliers: 32	Royal Garrison Artillery: 26
Lancashire Fusiliers: 26	Border Regiment: 22
Scots Guards: 21	South Wales Borderers: 20
Seaforth Highlanders: 17	Royal Engineers: 17
Machine Gun Corps: 17	Welch Regiment: 16
Northumberland Fusiliers: 14	Gordon Highlanders: 14
King's Shropshire Light Infantry: 13	King's Royal Rifle Corps: 13
Worcestershire Regiment: 13	Queen's Own Royal West Kent Regiment: 12
Royal Scots: 12	Middlesex Regiment: 11
Newfoundland Regiment: 10	King's Own Scottish Borderers: 10
Sherwood Foresters: 10	Machine Gun Guards: 10
Royal Fusiliers: 9	Monmouthshire Regiment: 9
Welsh Guards: 8	Black Watch: 8
Royal Inniskilling Fusiliers: 8	Durham Light Infantry: 8
Manchester Regiment: 7	Cheshire Regiment: 7
Royal Irish Fusiliers: 7	Hampshire Regiment: 7
Duke of Wellington's Regiment: 6	Gloucestershire Regiment: 6
Royal Horse Artillery: 6	Argyll and Sutherland Highlanders: 6
London Regiment: 5	Dorset Regiment: 5
Canadian Infantry Corps: 5	Oxford and Buckinghamshire Light Infantry: 5
Royal Dublin Fusiliers: 5	Rifle Brigade: 4
East Surrey Regiment: 4	Royal Sussex Regiment: 4
Queen's Royal Regiment: 4	Northamptonshire Regiment: 3
Bedfordshire Regiment: 3	King's Regiment: 2
Devonshire Regiment: 2	Royal Warwickshire Regiment: 2
Tank Corps: 2	Suffolk Regiment: 2
York and Lancaster Regiment: 2	Yorkshire Regiment: 2
Essex Regiment: 2	Highland Light Infantry: 2
Suffolk Regiment: 2	South Lancashire Regiment: 1
Somerset Light Infantry: 1	Royal Irish Rifles: 1
King's Own Yorkshire Light Infantry: 1	King's Own Royal Regiment: 1
Army Service Corps: 1	Canadian Mounted Rifles: 1
Queen's Own Cameron Highlanders: 1	Canadian Machine Gun Corps: 1
Connaught Rangers: 1	Hertfordshire Regiment: 1
**New Zealand Rifle Brigade**: 1	Norfolk Regiment: 1
Royal Army Medical Corps: 1	Royal Berkshire Regiment: 1
Wiltshire Regiment: 1	

== Notable burials ==
It is the location of the grave of Hedd Wyn (1887–1917), posthumous winner of the bardic chair at the 1917 National Eisteddfod, and of Francis Ledwidge (1887–1917), the Irish poet.

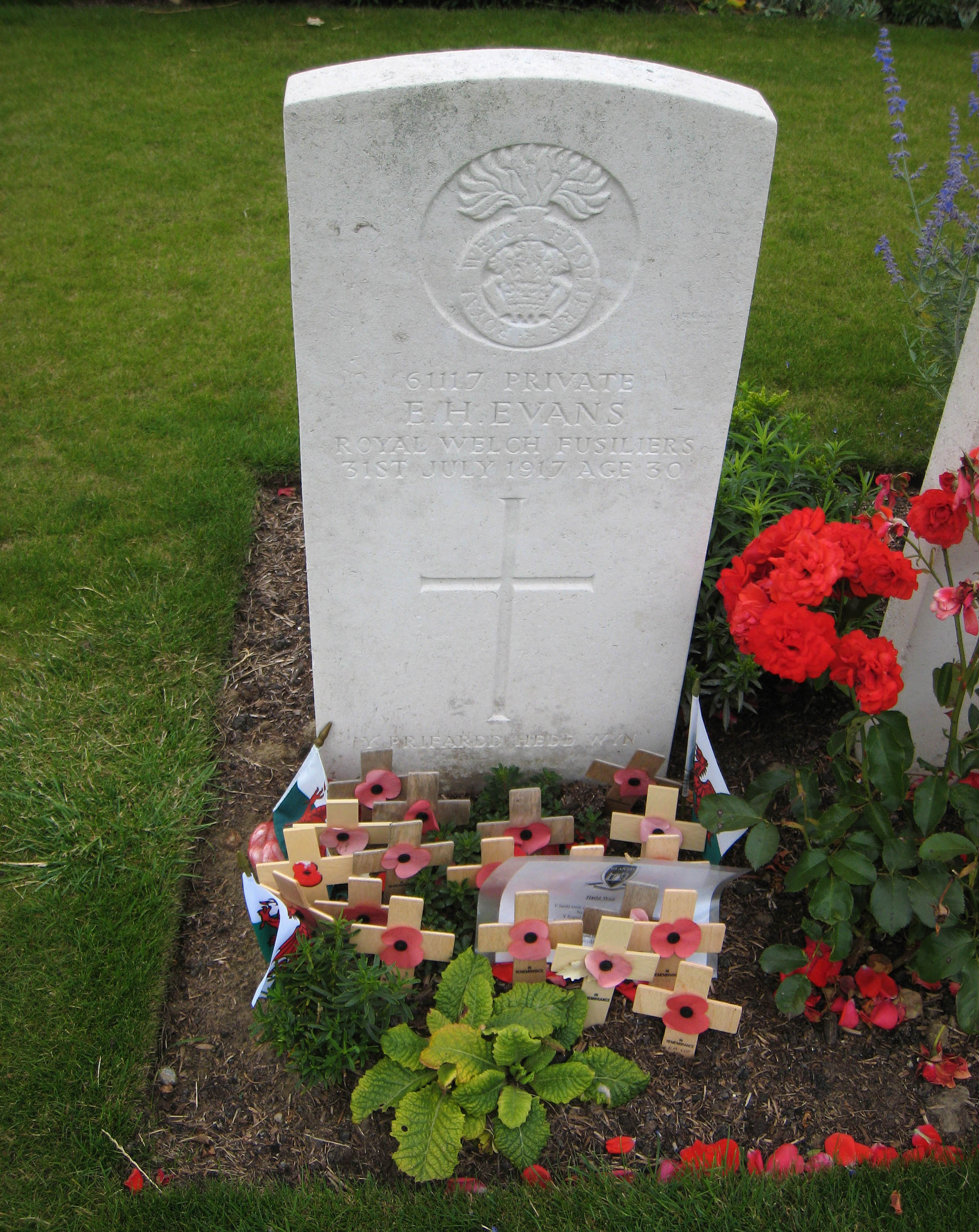
Hedd Wyn's gravestone

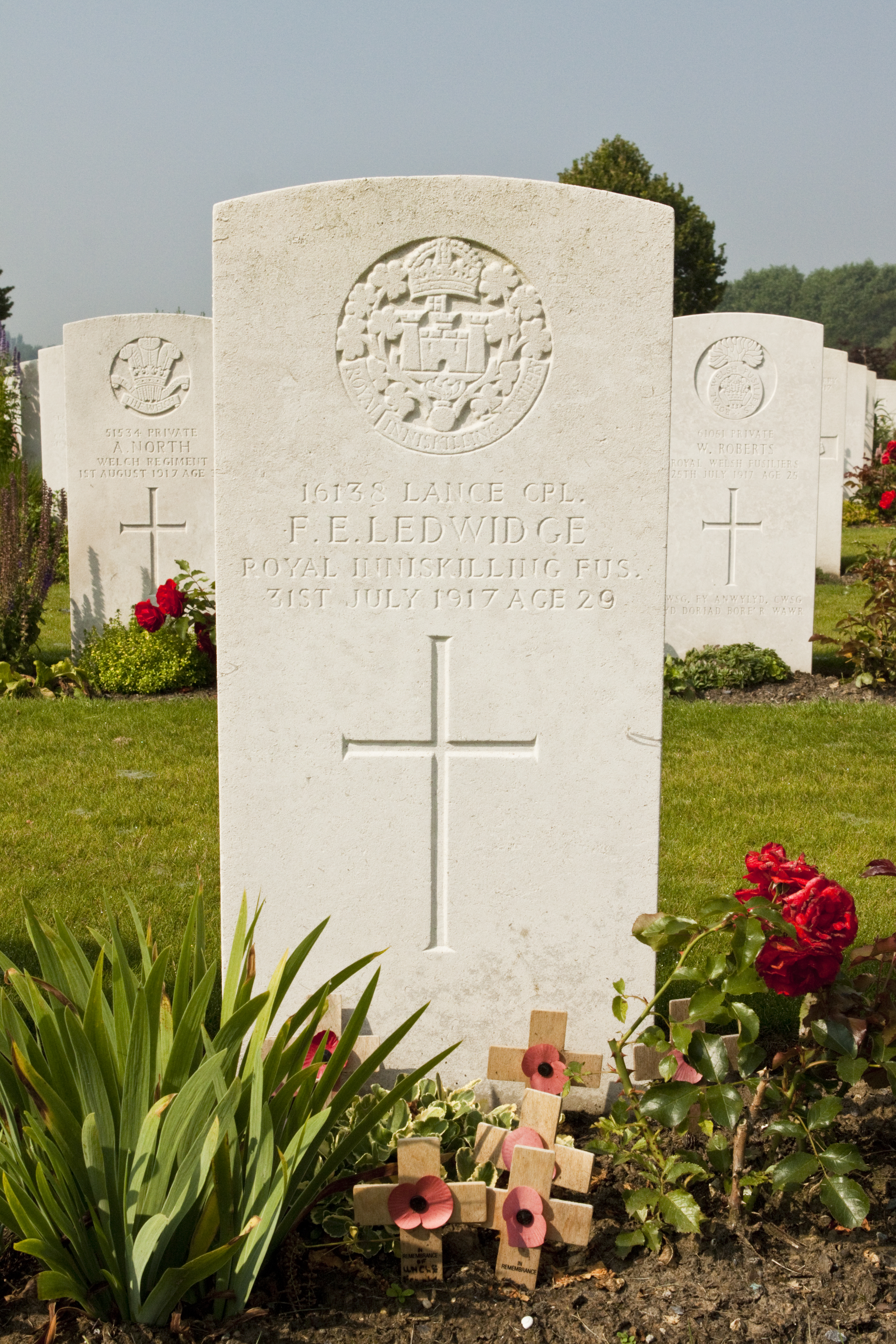
Francis Ledwidge's gravestone
