= Laura Evans-Williams =

Welsh singer

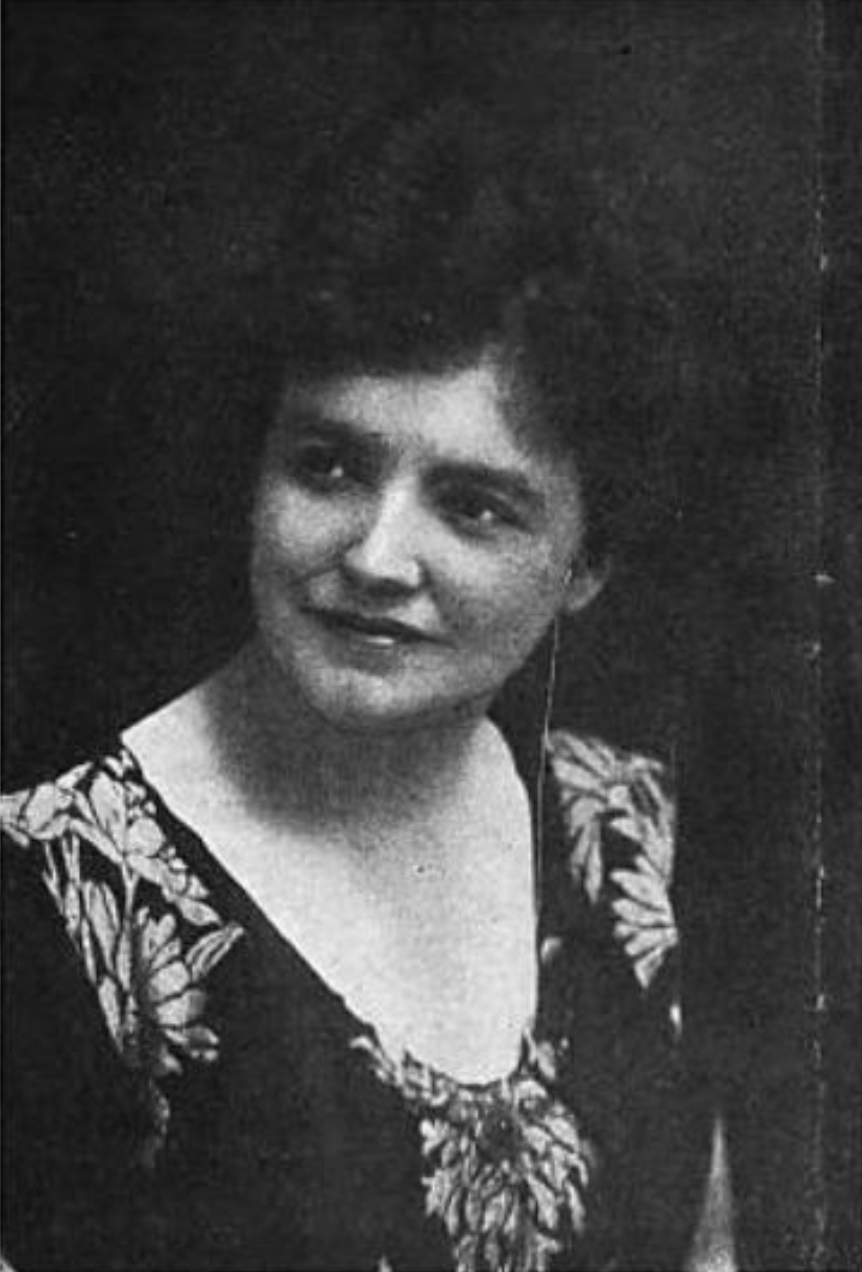
- Laura Evans-Williams in 1924
- Born: 7 September 1883; Henllan, Denbighshire
- Died: 5 October 1944 (aged 61); London, England
- Occupation: Singer
- Spouse: R.T. Williams
- Children: 2

Laura Evans-Williams (7 September 1883 – 5 October 1944) was a Welsh soprano singer.

== Early life and education ==
Laura Evans was born in Henllan, Denbighshire in the north-east Wales and was the eldest child of a castrator (1901 census), John Evans, and his wife Ellen Evans. Her sister was the director Eleanor Evans. Evans-Williams was educated at Howell's School, Denbigh and later the Royal Academy of Music where she studied under the guidance of Edward Iles who helped to develop her voice.

== Career ==
She started her career as a contralto singer and won prizes at several eisteddfodau. She performed in the 1911 edition of The Proms in the event's 28th day. Evans-Williams also performed operatic arias and Welsh folk-songs, and toured extensively with fellow contralto singer Clara Butt during World War I.

In 1910, Evans-Williams was featured as soloist in Edward Elgar's Caractacus in London, with Merlin Morgan conducting.

Evans-Williams had been invited to give the performance of the National Eisteddfod's traditional chairing song at the 1917 event held in Birkenhead, but she sang I Blas Gogerddan when it was announced the winner of the chair, Ellis Evans (Hedd Wyn), had been killed in battle. Evans-Williams had already lost her beloved brother, Stanley at Ypres in 1916 and would lose her elder brother, Hugh George at Peronne in 1918. She sang the chairing song when the Eisteddfod moved to Wrexham sixteen years later, and received an encore.

Evans-Williams undertook a concert tour of the United States in 1925–1926. She was the first Welsh artist to broadcast from Savoy Hill.

== Personal life ==
Laura Evans-Williams moved back to Colwyn Bay in 1940 after living in London and taught singing until she died on 5 October 1944. Evans-Williams was survived by her two children - Mair and Tudor; she was buried at Henllan. Her husband R.T. Williams, a London draper, originally from Henllan had died in 1916, aged 42 years
