= Hedd Wyn =

Welsh poet (1887–1917)

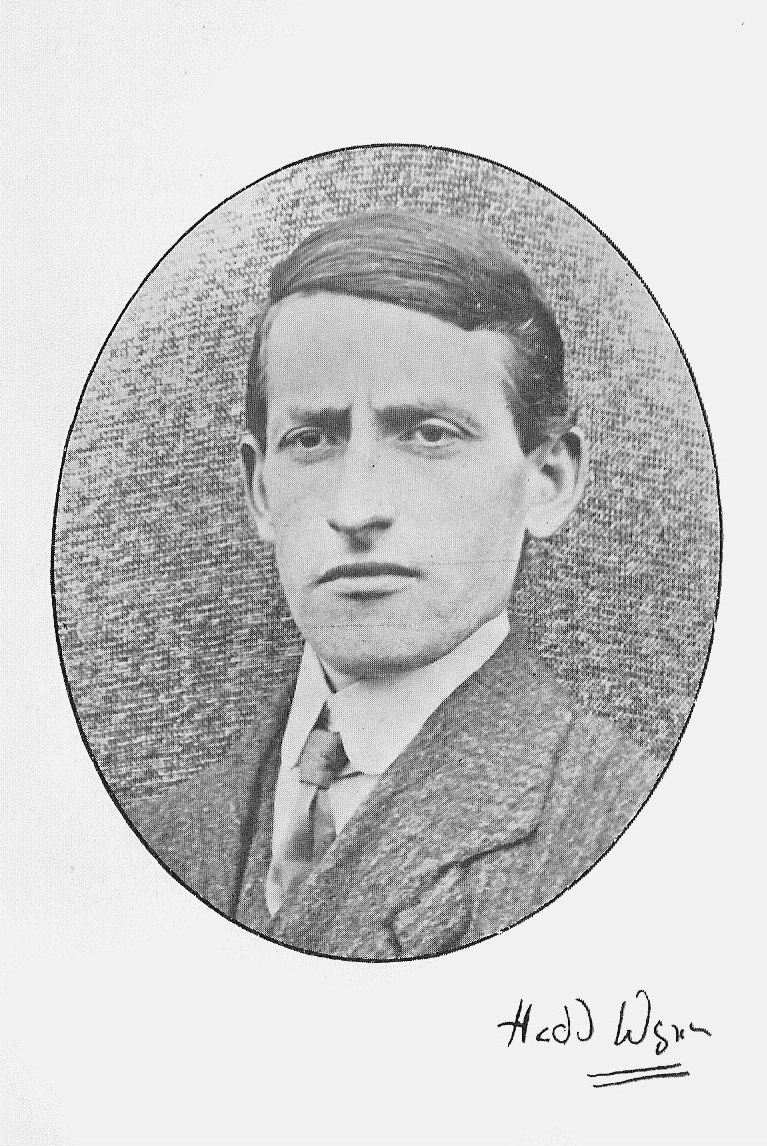
- Ellis Humphrey Evans, c. 1910. Frontispiece in Cerddi'r Bugail (1918)
- Born: Ellis Humphrey Evans; 13 January 1887; Yr Ysgwrn Trawsfynydd, Merionethshire, Wales
- Died: 31 July 1917 (aged 30); Pilckem Ridge, Passchendaele salient, Belgium
- Resting place: Artillery Wood Cemetery, Boezinge, Belgium
- Occupations: Poet; Shepherd/farmer; Soldier
- Writing career
- Pen name: Hedd wyn, Fleur De Lys
- Language: Welsh
- Genres: Romantic and war poetry
- Notable works: Yr Arwr, Ystrad Fflur, Plant Trawsfynydd, Y Blotyn Du, Nid â’n Ango, Rhyfel
- Notable awards: Bard's chair at the 1917 National Eisteddfod

Hedd Wyn (born Ellis Humphrey Evans, 13 January 1887 – 31 July 1917) was a Welsh-language poet who was killed on the first day of the Battle of Passchendaele during World War I. He was posthumously awarded the bard's chair at the 1917 National Eisteddfod. Evans, who had been awarded several chairs for his poetry, was inspired to take the Bardic name Hedd Wyn ([heːð wɨ̞n], "blessed peace") from the way sunlight penetrated the mist in the Meirionnydd valleys.

Born in the village of Trawsfynydd, Wales, Evans wrote much of his poetry while working as a shepherd on his family's hill farm. His style, which was influenced by romantic poetry, was dominated by themes of nature and religion. He also wrote several war poems following the outbreak of war on the Western Front in 1914.

== Early life ==
Ellis Humphrey Evans was born on 13 January 1887 at Penlan, a house in the centre of Trawsfynydd, Meirionydd, Wales. He was the eldest of eleven children born to Evan and Mary Evans. In the spring of 1887, the family moved to his father's family 168-acre (68 ha) hill-farm of Yr Ysgwrn, in Cwm Prysor, a few miles from Trawsfynydd. He spent his life there, apart from a short stint in South Wales.

Ellis Evans received a basic education from the age of six at the local primary school and Sunday school. He left school around 14 years of age and worked as a shepherd on his father's farm. Despite his brief attendance in formal schooling (6–14) he had a talent for poetry and had already composed his first poem by the age of 11, "Y Das Fawn" ('the peat stack'). Ellis's interests included both Welsh and English poetry. His main influence was the Romantic poetry of Percy Bysshe Shelley, and themes of nature and religion dominated his work.

== Eisteddfodau ==
His talent for poetry was well known in the village of Trawsfynydd, and he took part in numerous competitions and local eisteddfodau, winning his first chair (Cadair y Bardd) at Bala in 1907, aged 20. In 1910, he was given the bardic name Hedd Wyn by the bard Bryfdir at a poets' meeting in Blaenau Ffestiniog. Hedd is Welsh for peace and Wyn can mean white or pure; this 'blessed peace' also alluded to the way rays of sunlight penetrated the mists in the Meirionydd valleys.

Bryfdir was the bardic name of Evans's older friend Humphrey Jones (1867–1947), a quarryman from Blaenau Ffestiniog; in his lifetime, Jones published two volumes of poetry, won more than 60 bardic chairs and was an eisteddfod compère. Jones said he bestowed Hedd Wyn on Evans because he had the manner of a dreamer who moved slowly and calmly. Another close friend of Hedd Wyn was the clergyman and writer R. Silyn Roberts, who was known as Rhosyr.

In 1913, 26-year-old Hedd Wyn began to find fame for his poetry when he won chairs at the local eisteddfodau at Pwllheli and Llanuwchllyn. In 1915 he was successful at local eisteddfodau in Pontardawe and Llanuwchllyn. That same year he entered his first poem Eryri (an ode to Snowdonia) in the National Eisteddfod of Wales which was held in Bangor, Gwynedd. The following year he took second place at the National Eisteddfod in Aberystwyth with Ystrad Fflur, an awdl written in honour of Strata Florida, the medieval Cistercian abbey ruins in Ceredigion.

== First World War ==
Hedd Wyn was a Christian pacifist and did not enlist for the war initially, feeling he could never kill anyone. The war left Welsh non-conformists deeply divided. Traditionally, the Nonconformists had not been comfortable at all with the idea of warfare. The war saw a major clash within Welsh Nonconformism between those who backed military action and those who adopted a pacifist stance on religious grounds.

The war inspired Hedd Wyn's work and produced some of his most noted poetry, including Plant Trawsfynydd ('Children of Trawsfynydd'), Y Blotyn Du ('The Black Dot'), and Nid â’n Ango ('[It] Will Not Be Forgotten'). His poem, Rhyfel ('War'), remains one of his most frequently quoted works.

Gwae fi fy myw mewn oes mor ddreng,
A Duw ar drai ar orwel pell;
O'i ôl mae dyn, yn deyrn a gwreng,
Yn codi ei awdurdod hell.

Pan deimlodd fyned ymaith Dduw
Cyfododd gledd i ladd ei frawd;
Mae sŵn yr ymladd ar ein clyw,
A'i gysgod ar fythynnod tlawd.

Mae'r hen delynau genid gynt,
Ynghrog ar gangau'r helyg draw,
A gwaedd y bechgyn lond y gwynt,
A'u gwaed yn gymysg efo'r glaw

Translation:

Why must I live in this grim age,
When, to a far horizon, God
Has ebbed away, and man, with rage,
Now wields the sceptre and the rod?

Man raised his sword, once God had gone,
To slay his brother, and the roar
Of battlefields now casts upon
Our homes the shadow of the war.

The harps to which we sang are hung,
On willow boughs, and their refrain
Drowned by the anguish of the young
Whose blood is mingled with the rain.

=== Conscription ===
The "Lord Kitchener Wants You" recruitment poster from 1914.

Although farm work was classed as a reserved occupation due its national importance, in 1916, the Evans family were required to send one of their sons to join the British Army. The 29-year-old Ellis enlisted rather than his younger brother Robert. In February 1917, he received his training at Litherland Camp, Liverpool, but in March 1917 the government called for farm workers to help with ploughing and many soldiers were temporarily released. Hedd Wyn was given seven weeks' leave. He spent most of this leave working on the awdl Yr Arwr ('The Hero'), his submission for the National Eisteddfod. According to his nephew, Gerald Williams,

"It was a wet year in 1917. He came back for 14 days' leave and wrote the poem, Yr Arwr, on the table by the fire. As it was such a wet year, he stayed for another seven days. This extra seven days made him a deserter. So the military police came to fetch him from the hayfield and took him to the jail at Blaenau. From there he travelled to... the war in Belgium. Because he left in such a hurry he forgot the poem on the table, so he wrote it again on the journey. So there are two copies: one in Aberystwyth and one in Bangor."

In June 1917, Hedd Wyn joined the 15th (Service) Battalion, Royal Welsh Fusiliers (1st London Welsh) (part of the 38th (Welsh) Division) at Fléchin, France. His arrival depressed him, as exemplified in his quote, "Heavy weather, heavy soul, heavy heart. That is an uncomfortable trinity, isn’t it?" Nevertheless, at Fléchin he finished his National Eisteddfod entry and signed it “Fleur de Lis”. It is believed it was sent via the Royal Mail around the end of June. On 31 July, 15th Battalion marched towards the major offensive which would become known as the Battle of Passchendaele.

=== Third Battle of Ypres and death ===
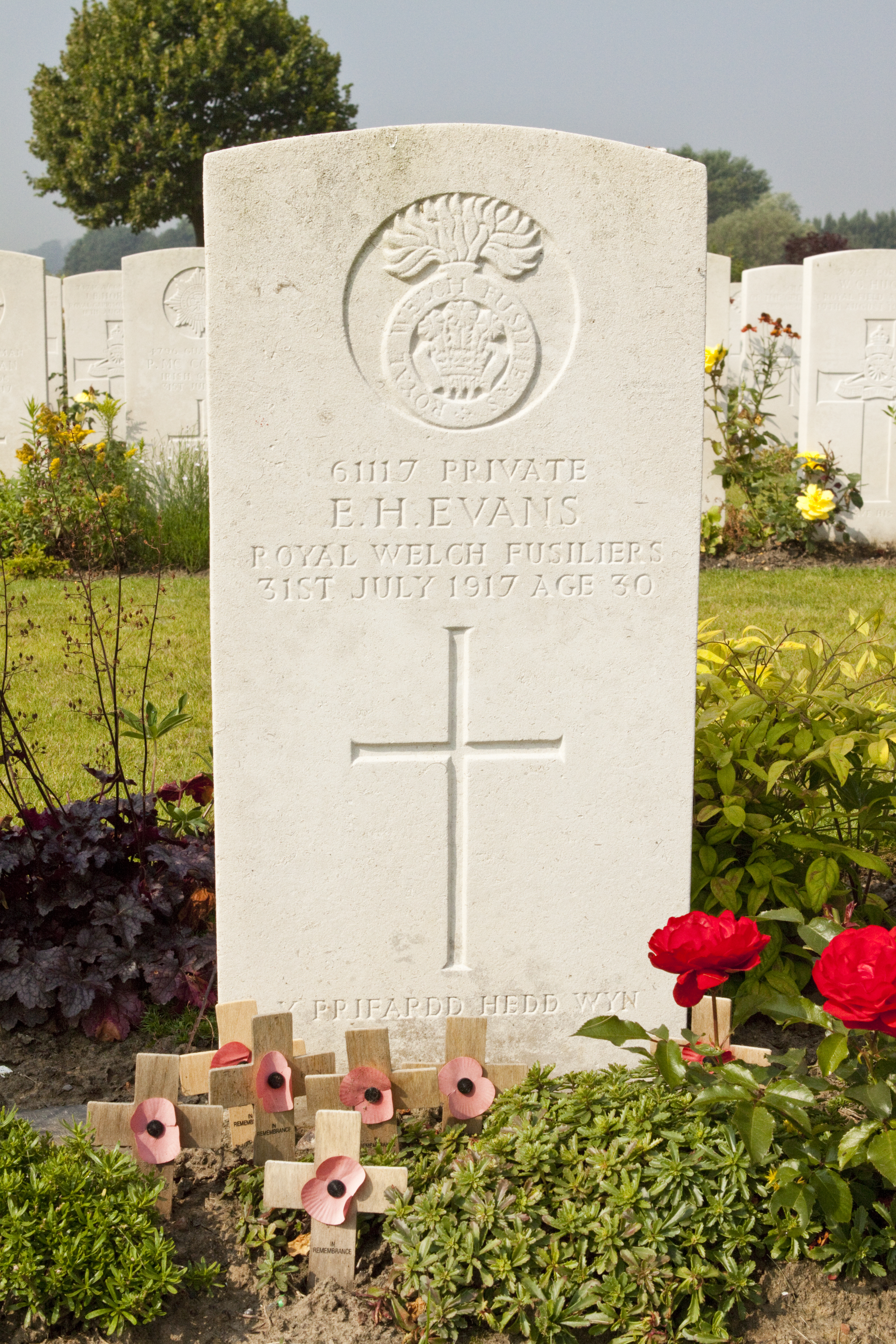
The grave of Hedd Wyn at Artillery Wood Cemetery, Boezinge, Belgium.

Hedd Wyn was fatally wounded within the first few hours of the start of the Third Battle of Ypres on 31 July 1917. He fell during the Battle of Pilckem Ridge which had begun at 3:50 a.m. with a heavy bombardment of the German lines (this was the opening attack in what became known as Battle of Passchendaele). However, the troops' advance was hampered by incoming artillery and machine gun fire, and by heavy rain turning the battlefield to swamp.

Private Evans, as part of the 15th (Service) Battalion (1st London Welsh), was advancing towards a German strongpoint – created within the ruins of the Belgian hamlet of Hagebos ("Iron Cross") – when he was hit. In an interview conducted in 1975 by St Fagans National History Museum, Simon Jones, a veteran of the Royal Welsh Fusiliers, recalled,

"We started over Canal Bank at Ypres, and he was killed half way across Pilckem. I've heard many say that they were with Hedd Wyn and this and that, well I was with him... I saw him fall and I can say that it was a nosecap shell in his stomach that killed him. You could tell that... He was going in front of me, and I saw him fall on his knees and grab two fistfuls of dirt... He was dying, of course... There were stretcher bearers coming up behind us, you see. There was nothing – well, you'd be breaking the rules if you went to help someone who was injured when you were in an attack."

Soon after being wounded, Hedd Wyn was carried to a first-aid post. Still conscious, he asked the doctor "Do you think I will live?" though it was clear that he had little chance of surviving; he died at about 11:00 a.m. Among the fatalities that day was the Irish war poet, Francis Ledwidge, who was "blown to bits" while drinking tea in a shell hole.

Ellis H. Evans was buried in Section II, Row F, Grave 11 at Artillery Wood Cemetery, near Boezinge. After a petition was submitted to the Imperial War Graves Commission after the war, his headstone was given the additional words Y Prifardd Hedd Wyn (English: "The Chief Bard, Hedd Wyn").

== Legacy ==
=== National Eisteddfod ===
On 6 September 1917, the ceremony of Chairing of the Bard took place at the National Eisteddfod in Birkenhead Park, England; in attendance was the Welsh-speaking British Prime Minister, David Lloyd George. After the adjudicators announced that the entry submitted under the pseudonym Fleur de Lys was the winner, the trumpets were sounded for the author to identify themselves. After three such summons, Archdruid Dyfed solemnly announced that the winner had been killed in action six weeks earlier. The empty chair was then draped in a black sheet. It was delivered to Evans's parents in the same condition, "the festival in tears and the poet in his grave", as Archdruid Dyfed said. The festival is now referred to as "Eisteddfod y Gadair Ddu" ("The Eisteddfod of the Black Chair").

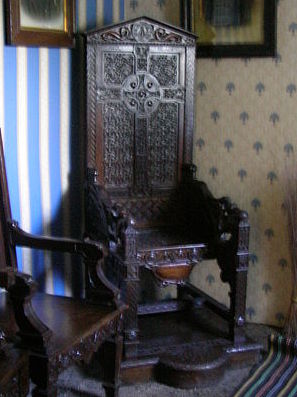
The Black Chair (Y Gadair Ddu) is on permanent display at his family farm near Trawsfynydd

The chair was hand-crafted by Flemish craftsman, Eugeen Vanfleteren (1880–1950), a carpenter born in Mechelen, Belgium, who had fled to England on the outbreak of war and had settled in Birkenhead.

According to historian Jan Morris, "Hedd Wyn became a legend, a symbol, and an inspiration to other poets. 'The Black Chair of Birkenhead' was taken sadly home to Gwynedd, to be placed with the other trophies of Hedd Wyn's short life in the family farm above the Bala road, and there we may visit it still. It has never been forgotten. A constant stream of visitors, patriots, poets, groups of schoolchildren, winds its way up the long farm drive, in the lee of the hills, to the old house among its clumped trees. It stands there all alone looking out magnificently over bare hills to the ramparts of Eryri in the distance – the very epitome of a Welsh view, all grandeur tinged with melancholy. The Black Chair is kept in a sort of shrine-room, dim-lit and cluttered. Around it three or four other eisteddfod chairs stand in attendance, like sacred stools in an Ashanti temple..."

=== Manuscripts and publications ===
Immediately after the Eisteddfod, a committee was formed in Trawsfynydd to look after the poet's legacy. Under the leadership of J. R. Jones, the head teacher of the village school, all manuscripts in the poet's hand were collected and carefully preserved. Due to the committee's efforts, the first anthology of the bard's work, titled Cerddi'r Bugail ("The Shepherd's Poems"), was published in 1918. The manuscripts were donated to the National Library of Wales in 1934.

Hedd Wyn, Ei Farddoniaeth, a complete Welsh language anthology of his works, was published by Trawsfynydd's Merilang Press in 2012.

The poem Yr Arwr ("The Hero"), for which Hedd Wyn won the National Eisteddfod, is still considered his greatest work. The ode is structured in four parts and presents two principal characters, Merch y Drycinoedd ("Daughter of the Tempests") and the Arwr. There has been much disagreement in the past regarding the meaning of the ode. It can be said with certainty that Hedd Wyn, like his favourite poet Shelley, longed for a perfect humanity and a perfect world during the chaos of war.

Merch y Drycinoedd has been perceived as a symbol of love, the beauty of nature, and creativity; and Yr Arwr as a symbol of goodness, fairness, freedom, and justice. It is wished that through his sacrifice, and his union with Merch y Drycinoedd at the end of the ode, a better age will come.

=== Trawsfynydd and Yr Ysgwrn ===
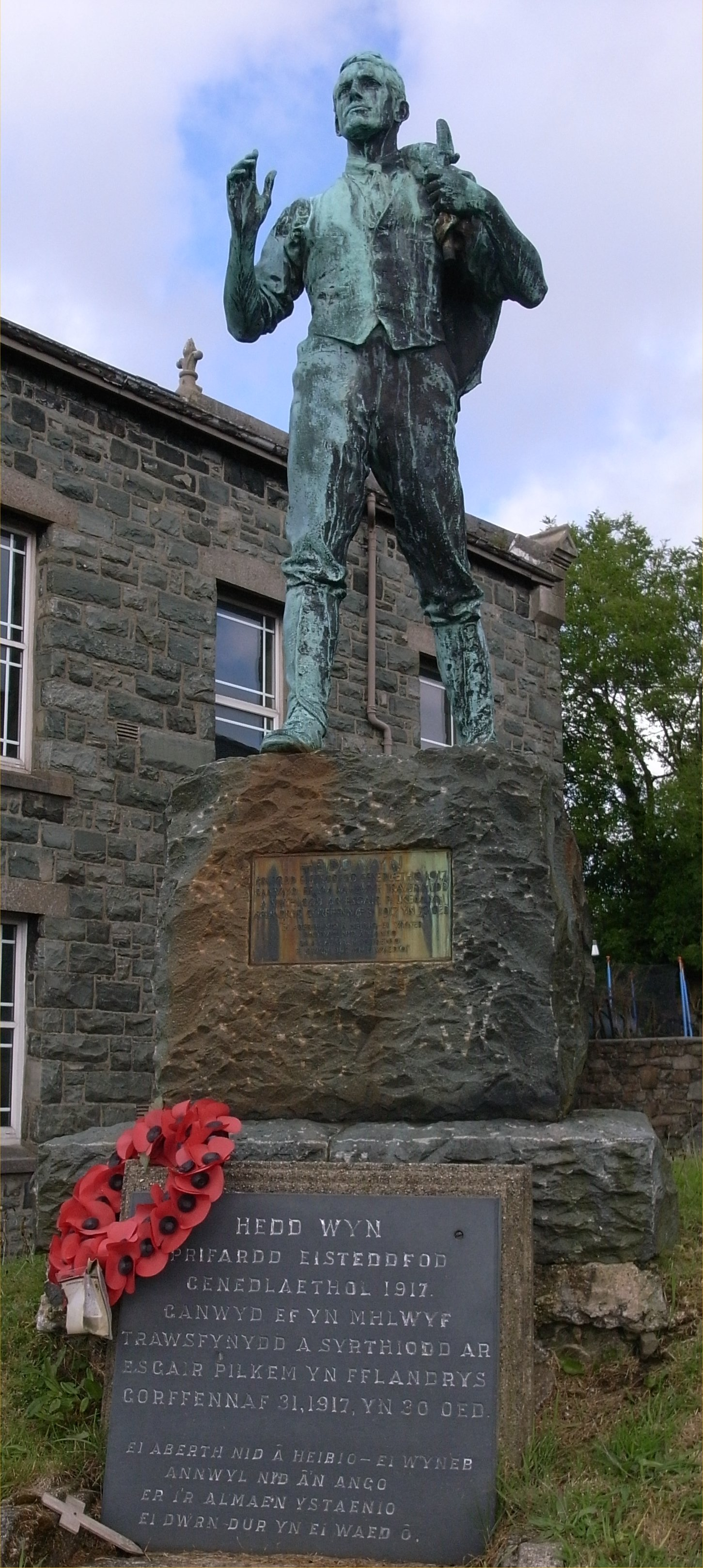
The statue of Hedd Wyn in his home village of Trawsfynydd.

A bronze statue of Hedd Wyn, dressed as a shepherd, was unveiled by his mother in the centre of the village in 1923. It bears an englyn which Hedd Wyn had written in memory of a slain friend, Tommy Morris.

Ei aberth nid â heibio – ei wyneb
Annwyl nid â'n ango
Er i'r Almaen ystaenio
Ei dwrn dur yn ei waed o.

Translation:

His sacrifice was not in vain, his face
In our minds will remain,
Although he left a bloodstain
On Germany's iron fist of pain.

Evans's bardic chair is on permanent display at his family's hill farm, Yr Ysgwrn. The property was preserved just as it was in 1917 by the poet's family and his nephew Gerald Williams (d. 2021), who was the last of his relatives to live on the farm. For years, Gerald and his brother Ellis continued to farm the land surrounding the farmhouse as custodians of both Yr Ysgwrn and Hedd Wyn’s legacy, welcoming visitors and working to ensure Hedd Wyn’s story lived on. In 2012, fourteen years after Ellis's death, Gerald decided it was time to pass on the custodianship of Yr Ysgwrn to the Snowdonia National Park Authority.

The Park Authority, with support from the Welsh Government and the National Lottery, announced on St David's Day 2012 that it had acquired the Grade II*-listed farmstead and its surrounding lands for the Welsh nation. The Authority's objectives are to protect and preserve the site while enhancing the visitor experience in order to share the story of Hedd Wyn. In the same year, Gerald Williams was awarded an MBE for his "exceptional contribution" to conserving the heritage of his bardic uncle.

=== Centennial commemorations ===
Hedd Wyn's family farm, Yr Ysgwrn, is now preserved and managed by Eryri National Park

In August 2014, the Welsh Memorial Park, Ypres was unveiled at Pilckem Ridge near Ypres. The war memorial stands close to the spot where Hedd Wyn was mortally wounded in July 1917 during the Battle of Passchendaele.

To mark the 100th anniversary of his death, a Bardic chair was made to celebrate the life of Hedd Wyn. It was presented to the Welsh Government at a special service of remembrance at Birkenhead Park in September 2017. A memorial to the poet was also unveiled in the park, the site of the 1917 National Eisteddfod.

In November 2017, as part of the annual British Armistice commemorations, a video installation commemorating the life of Hedd Wyn was beamed onto the exterior walls of the National Library of Wales, Aberystwyth. The work was the culmination of a project involving more than 800 schoolchildren and adults at primary and secondary schools across Wales which looked at the life and legacy of the poet.

== In popular culture ==
=== Film ===
The anti-war biopic Hedd Wyn was released in 1992. The film, which starred Huw Garmon as the poet, is based on a screenplay by Alan Llwyd. It depicts Hedd Wyn as a tragic hero who has an intense dislike of the wartime ultranationalism which surrounds him and his doomed struggle to avoid conscription.

In 1993, Hedd Wyn won the Royal Television Society's Television Award for Best Single Drama. It became the first British motion picture to be nominated for Best Foreign Language Film at the 66th Academy Awards in 1993. In 1994, at the newly inaugurated BAFTA Cymru Awards, it won in six categories: Best Director (Paul Turner), Best Design (by Jane Roberts and Martin Morley), Best Drama – Welsh (Shan Davies and Paul Turner), Best Editor (Chris Lawrence), Best Original Music (John E.R. Hardy) and Best Screenwriter – Welsh (Alan Llwyd).

=== Literature ===
The Black Chair, a 2009 novel for young people by Phil Carradice, is based on the life of Hedd Wyn. In July 2017, Y Lolfa published An Empty Chair, a novel for young people telling the story of Hedd Wyn as seen from the point of view of his teenage sister, Anni (mother of Gerald Williams). It is an adaptation by Haf Llewelyn of her prize-winning Welsh-language novel, Diffodd Y Sêr.

=== Music ===
The track "Halflife" on the 2015 album Everyone Was a Bird by avant garde electronica group Grasscut references Hedd Wyn as a figure in the history of Trawsfynydd, merging his presence with that of the reactors of the Trawsfynydd nuclear power station.

=== Opera ===
The 2017 opera 2117/Hedd Wyn, with music by Stephen McNeff and libretto by Gruff Rhys, was inspired by the life of Hedd Wyn; set in the year 2117, it imagines a group of schoolchildren in a post-apocalyptic Trawsfynydd learning about the life and work of the poet. It was recorded by Tŷ Cerdd Records and released in 2022.

== Notes ==
=== References ===
- Carradice, Phil (2009). The Black Chair. Pont Books. ISBN 978-1-84323-978-9
- Dehandschutter, Lieven (1st Edn 1992, 4th Edn 2001). Hedd Wyn. A Welsh tragedy in Flanders. Vormingscentrum Lodewijk Dosfel (Gent, Flanders, Belgium)
- Llwyd, Alan (2009). Stori Hedd Wyn, Bardd y Gadair Ddu. The Story of Hedd Wyn, the Poet of the Black Chair. Cyhoeddiadau Barddas / Barddas Publications. ISBN 978-1-906396-20-6
