= Fourth Army (United Kingdom) =

British field army during the First World War

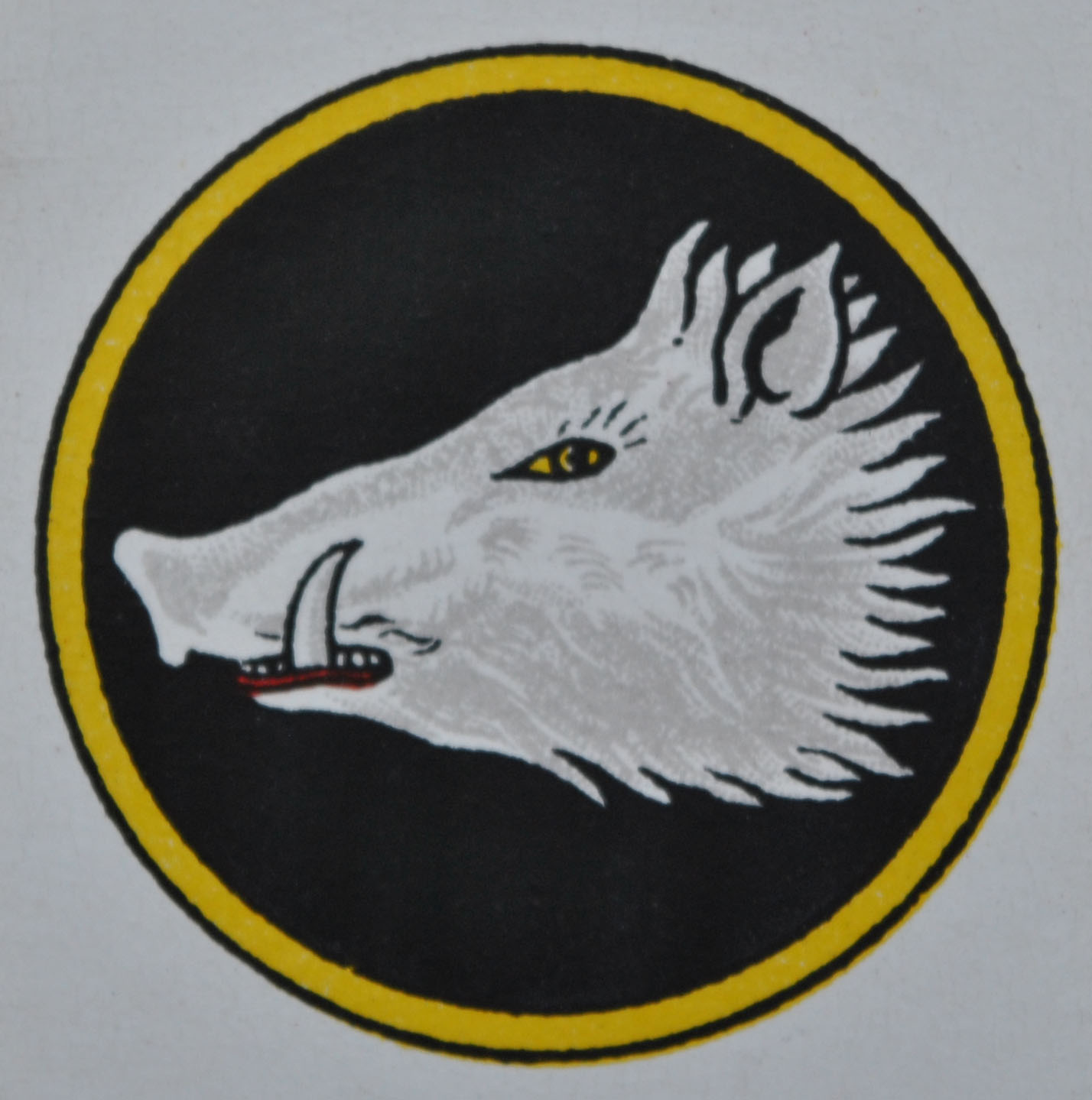
- 4th Army formation badge.
- Active: First World War (1916–1918); Second World War (1943–1944, as deception only)
- Country: United Kingdom
- Branch: British Army
- Type: Army
- Engagements: First World War

Commanders
- Notable commanders: Sir Henry Rawlinson

The Fourth Army was a field army that formed part of the British Expeditionary Force during the First World War. The Fourth Army was formed on 5 February 1916 under the command of General Sir Henry Rawlinson to carry out the main British contribution to the Battle of the Somme.

== First World War ==
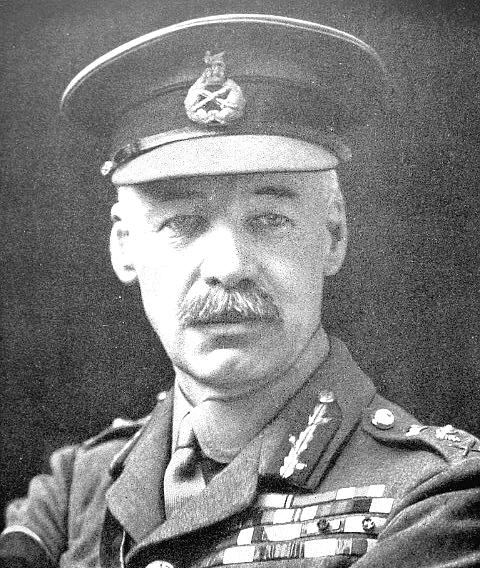
General Sir Henry Rawlinson

=== History ===
The Fourth Army was formed in France on 5 February 1916, under the command of Sir Henry Rawlinson. It was created in preparation for the Battle of the Somme after the French Tenth Army was transferred to the Battle of Verdun. On the first day on the Somme, eleven Fourth Army divisions (from XIII Corps, XV Corps, III Corps, X Corps and VIII Corps) attacked astride the Albert–Bapaume road. The attack was completely defeated on the northern sector, so subsequent Fourth Army operations concentrated on the southern sector, handing control of the northern sector to the Reserve Army.

The plan for the Fourth Army during the Third Battle of Ypres (31 July – 10 November 1917), was to mount Operation Hush, an amphibious invasion of the Belgian coast. Once the Germans had been pushed back from the Passchendaele–Westroosebeke ridge and an advance begun on Roeselare and Torhout, the XV Corps would mount the coastal operation. As the Ypres fighting became bogged down, the Fourth Army divisions were drawn off as reinforcements until the army was effectively disbanded.

The Fourth Army was reformed in early 1918—once again under Rawlinson—following the virtual destruction and subsequent disbanding of the Fifth Army during the German offensive known as Operation Michael.

The Fourth Army spearheaded the British Hundred Days offensive that began with the Battle of Amiens and ended with the Armistice in November, 1918.

=== Order of Battle ===
On the first day of the Somme the Fourth Army comprised:

- III Corps, commanded by Lieutenant-General Sir William Pulteney.
  - 1st Division
  - 8th Division
  - 12th (Eastern) Division
  - 19th (Western) Division
  - 23rd Division
  - 34th Division
- VIII Corps, commanded by Lieutenant-General Aylmer Hunter-Weston. (transferred to Reserve Army on 4 July)
  - 4th Division
  - 29th Division
  - 31st Division
  - 48th (South Midland) Division
- X Corps, commanded by Lieutenant-General Thomas Morland. (transferred to Reserve Army on 4 July)
  - 12th (Eastern) Division
  - 25th Division
  - 32nd Division
  - 36th (Ulster) Division
  - 49th (West Riding) Division
- XIII Corps, commanded by Lieutenant-General Walter Congreve.
  - 3rd Division
  - 9th (Scottish) Division
  - 18th (Eastern) Division
  - 30th Division
  - 35th Division
- XV Corps
  - 7th Division
  - 17th (Northern) Division
  - 21st Division
  - 33rd Division
  - 38th (Welsh) Division
  - New Zealand Division

When reformed for the Battle of Amiens:

- Cavalry Corps, commanded by Lieutenant-General Kavanagh
  - 1st Cavalry Division
  - 2nd Cavalry Division
  - 3rd Cavalry Division
- III Corps, commanded by Lieutenant-General Richard Butler
  - 12th (Eastern) Division
  - 18th (Eastern) Division
  - 47th (2nd London) Division, included the 131st Infantry Regiment, 33rd American Division
  - 58th (2/1st London) Division
- Canadian Corps, commanded by Lieutenant-General Arthur Currie
  - 32nd Division
  - 1st Canadian Division
  - 2nd Canadian Division
  - 3rd Canadian Division
  - 4th Canadian Division
- Australian Corps, commanded by Lieutenant-General John Monash
  - 17th (Northern) Division
  - 1st Australian Division
  - 2nd Australian Division
  - 3rd Australian Division
  - 4th Australian Division
  - 5th Australian Division.

In September 1918 the Army was the only British force reinforced with substantial American (AEF) forces:

- II Corps, American Expeditionary Force under Major General George Read
  - 27th Infantry Division AEF
  - 30th Infantry Division AEF

=== Commanders ===
- February 1916–February 1918 General Sir Henry Rawlinson
- February–March 1918 General Sir William Birdwood (temporary)
- April 1918–March 1919 General Sir Henry Rawlinson

== Second World War ==
In the Second World War, no Fourth Army took the field but as part of the deception plans Operation Cockade and the later Operation Fortitude North, the Germans were encouraged to believe that a Fourth Army had been established with its headquarters in Edinburgh Castle and was preparing to invade Norway. The selection of the inactive Fourth Army was likely very deliberate because of its combat history during the First World War. That diverted and kept German units away from the real invasion zone in Normandy. In the subsequent Operation Fortitude South, the Fourth Army, with different units, was presented as part of the fictitious First United States Army Group (FUSAG) in its threat to the Pas-de-Calais. After Operation Market Garden, the Fourth Army was notionally intended to conduct Operation Trolleybar, an amphibious assault upon the coast of the Netherlands and later along the German coast. It was to involve a landing by the phantom 76th Infantry Division until the deception was ended in January 1945.

=== Fictitious composition during Fortitude ===
==== Fortitude North ====
HQ at Edinburgh

- British II Corps (fictitious - HQ Stirling)
  - 55th Infantry Division (Northern Ireland)
  - 58th Infantry Division (fictitious, Aberlour)
  - 113th Independent Infantry Brigade (garrison for Orkney and Shetland Islands)
- VII Corps (fictitious - HQ Dundee)
  - 52nd (Lowland) Infantry Division (Dundee)
  - US 55th Infantry Division (fictitious - Iceland)
  - 7th, 9th & 10th US Ranger battalions (fictitious - Iceland)
- US XV Corps (Northern Ireland)
  - US 2nd Infantry Division
  - US 5th Infantry Division
  - US 8th Infantry Division

==== Fortitude South ====
HQ at Hathfield

- 2nd Airborne Division (fictitious - Bulford)
- II Corps (fictitious - HQ Tunbridge Wells)
  - 35th Armoured Brigade (Maresfield)
  - 55th Infantry Division (Three Bridges
  - British 58th Infantry Division (fictitious - Gravesend)
- VII Corps (fictitious - HQ Folkestone)
  - 61st Infantry Division (Wye)
  - 80th Infantry Division (fictitious - Canterbury)
  - 5th Armoured Division (fictitious - Newmarket)
