= Aubrey Williams (British Army officer) =

British Army officer

Major-General Aubrey Williams CBE DSO* MC
- Born: 19 May 1888
- Died: 25 March 1977 (aged 88)
- Military career
- Allegiance: United Kingdom
- Branch: British Army
- Service years: 1907–1940; 1941–1944
- Rank: Major-General
- Service number: 4098
- Unit: South Wales Borderers
- Commands: 1st Battalion, South Wales Borderers; 160th Infantry Brigade; 38th (Welsh) Infantry Division
- Conflicts: First World War; Second World War
- Awards: Commander of the Order of the British Empire; Distinguished Service Order & Bar; Military Cross; Mentioned in despatches (5)

Major-General Aubrey Ellis Williams, CBE, DSO & Bar, MC (19 May 1888 – 25 March 1977) was a senior British Army officer who served in both the First World War and Second World War.

== Military career ==
The son of a British Army officer, Lieutenant Colonel D. E. Williams, Aubrey Williams was born on 19 May 1888 and was educated at Monmouth School for Boys. He later entered the Royal Military College, Sandhurst, from where he was commissioned as a second lieutenant into the South Wales Borderers on 9 October 1907. He was promoted to lieutenant on 9 June 1909.

Williams fought in the First World War and received a promotion to the rank of captain on 22 October 1914. After seeing action in the Gallipoli campaign, and after being awarded the Military Cross (MC) in 1916, he served as a staff officer with the 30th Division on the Western Front, earning recognition with his appointment as a Companion of the Distinguished Service Order (DSO). The citation for his DSO reads:

At Menin, on October 14th, 1918, he made a very bold reconnaissance of the river crossings in face of considerable shell and machine-gun fire and forward of all our infantry posts, thus enabling a bridge to be thrown over at the earliest opportunity. Though badly concussed by a 5-9 inch bursting within a few feet of him, he still continued at duty. His fearlessness at all times was a fine example to all ranks.

He was wounded twice and was also mentioned in despatches five times during his service in the First World War.

Williams also saw action during the Waziristan campaign in late 1937 earning him a bar to his DSO in August 1938.

He became commander of the 160th Infantry Brigade, part of the 53rd (Welsh) Infantry Division, in February 1939 and, in April 1940, seven months after the outbreak of the Second World War, went with his brigade to Northern Ireland where it was mainly involved in anti-invasion duties and exercises training to repel a potential German invasion of Northern Ireland. After being promoted to the permanent rank of major general on 10 May (with his seniority dating back to 23 July 1938) he became General Officer Commanding (GOC) of the 38th (Welsh) Division in the United Kingdom that same day before retiring from the army in October.

In retirement he was local President of the Royal British Legion on the Isle of Wight.

== Bibliography ==
- Smart, Nick (2005). Biographical Dictionary of British Generals of the Second World War. Barnsley, South Yorkshire: Pen and Sword Books. ISBN 1844150496.

Military offices
Preceded by Geoffrey Raikes	GOC 38th (Welsh) Infantry Division; May–October 1940	Succeeded by Noel Irwin
