= Lionel Howard Cox =

British Army general (1893–1949)

Major-General Lionel Howard Cox CB CBE MC
- Born: 1 April 1893
- Died: 29 July 1949 (aged 56)
- Military career
- Allegiance: United Kingdom
- Branch: British Army
- Service years: 1912–1948
- Rank: Major-General
- Service number: 5085
- Unit: Gloucestershire Regiment
- Commands: Singapore District; 38th (Welsh) Infantry Division; 80th Infantry Division; North Wales District; Malta Brigade; 2nd Battalion, Gloucestershire Regiment
- Conflicts: First World War; Second World War
- Awards: Companion of the Order of the Bath; Commander of the Order of the British Empire; Military Cross

Major-General Lionel Howard Cox, CB, CBE, MC (1 April 1893 – 29 July 1949) was a British Army officer.

== Military career ==
Cox saw action with the Gloucestershire Regiment and the Machine Gun Corps, earning recognition with the award of the Military Cross, during the First World War. He served as commanding officer of the 2nd Battalion Gloucestershire Regiment between 1935 and 1938. He went on to be commander of the Malta Brigade in 1938, District Officer Commanding North Wales District in 1941 and General Officer Commanding 80th Infantry Division in the UK in January 1943. After that he became General Officer Commanding 38th (Welsh) Infantry Division also in the UK in September 1944 and District Officer Commanding Singapore District in 1945 before retiring in 1948.

Cox was appointed a Companion of the Order of the Bath in the 1945 Birthday Honours.

== Bibliography ==
- Smart, Nick (2005). Biographical Dictionary of British Generals of the Second World War. Barnesley: Pen & Sword. ISBN 1844150496.

Military offices
Preceded by New post	GOC 80th Infantry Division; 1943–1944	Succeeded by Division disbanded
Preceded by Donald Butterworth	GOC 38th (Welsh) Infantry Division; 1944–1945	Succeeded by Division disbanded
