= 38th (Welsh) Infantry Division =

Division of the British Army

43rd Division 38th (Welsh) Division 38th (Welsh) Infantry Division 38th Infantry (Reserve) Division
- The First World War shoulder patch, a red dragon
- Active: December 1914 – June 1919; 1939–1945
- Branch: New Army (1914–1919); Territorial Army (1939–1944); British Army (1944–1945)
- Type: Infantry
- Role: Infantry, home defence and training
- Engagements: Battle of the Somme; Third Battle of Ypres; Hundred Days Offensive

The 38th (Welsh) Division (initially the 43rd Division, later the 38th (Welsh) Infantry Division and then the 38th Infantry (Reserve) Division) of the British Army was active during both the First and Second World Wars. In 1914, the division was raised as the 43rd Division of Herbert Kitchener's New Army, and was originally intended to form part of a 50,000-strong Welsh Army Corps that had been championed by David Lloyd George; the assignment of Welsh recruits to other formations meant that this concept was never realised.

The 43rd was renamed the 38th (Welsh) Division on 29 April 1915, and shipped to France later that year. It arrived in France with a poor reputation, seen as a political formation that was ill-trained and poorly led. The division's baptism by fire came in the first days of the Battle of the Somme, where it captured Mametz Wood at the loss of nearly 4,000 men. This strongly held German position needed to be secured in order to facilitate the next phase of the Somme offensive, the Battle of Bazentin Ridge. Despite securing its objective, the division's reputation was adversely affected by miscommunication among senior officers.

A year later the division made a successful attack in the Battle of Pilckem Ridge, the opening of the Third Battle of Ypres. This action redeemed the division in the eyes of the upper hierarchy of the British military. In 1918, during the German spring offensive and the subsequent Allied Hundred Days Offensive, the division attacked several fortified German positions. It crossed the Ancre River, broke through the Hindenburg Line and German positions on the River Selle, ended the war on the Belgian frontier, and was considered one of the Army's elite units. The division was not chosen to be part of the Occupation of the Rhineland after the war, and was demobilised over several months. It ceased to exist by March 1919.

In March 1939, following the reemergence of Germany and its occupation of Czechoslovakia, the British army increased the number of divisions within the Territorial Army by duplicating existing units. On paper, the division was recreated as the 38th (Welsh) Infantry Division, a duplicate of the 53rd (Welsh) Infantry Division. It was formed in September 1939, however it was never deployed overseas as a division, having been restricted to home defence duties around the United Kingdom.

In 1944, it was disbanded and its units were either deployed or broken up to reinforce the 21st Army Group in Normandy during Operation Overlord. The 38th Division was recreated on 1 September 1944 as the 38th Infantry (Reserve) Division, a training formation that took over the role previously occupied by the 80th Infantry (Reserve) Division. In this form, the division completed the training of recruits, who were then dispatched overseas as reinforcements. At the end of the war, the division was again stood down.

== First World War ==
=== Formation and training ===
Recruiting poster for Herbert Kitchener's New Army

On 28 July 1914, the First World War began; on 4 August, Germany invaded Belgium and the United Kingdom entered the war to uphold the Treaty of London (1839). Britain faced a continental war it was not prepared to fight; the Expeditionary Force was dispatched but the country lacked the forces required for the protracted war envisioned by the military leadership. (Note: The Expeditionary Force was prefaced with British when the Indian Expeditionary Force arrived in France)

On 5 August, Herbert Kitchener was appointed Secretary of State for War. This position allowed Kitchener a largely independent role within the war cabinet. His first act, the next day, was to request parliamentary approval to increase the strength of the British Army by 500,000 men. Over the following days, the Army Council laid out plans for Kitchener's proposed expansion: traditional recruitment would be used to expand the regular army, bypassing the county associations and thus avoiding expanding the Territorial Force. The first wave, originally termed the New Expeditionary Force, became the First New Army. Historian Peter Simkins wrote that Kitchener held the Territorial Force in disdain, calling it an ill-trained "Town Clerk's Army", and this was partially why he set up a parallel recruitment system. Simkins noted that it would be a "gross oversimplification to ascribe Kitchener's decision merely to prejudice and ignorance". Had the Territorial Force been used as the basis for expansion it would have been "swamped" and "rendered temporarily incapable of carrying out any function at all", when a "viable home defence force" was needed due to the threat of a German invasion.

On 19 September 1914, Chancellor of the Exchequer David Lloyd George stated publicly that he "should like to see a Welsh Army in the field". This thought quickly picked up support from politicians and from Kitchener; a Welsh Army Corps of two divisions totalling 50,000 men was approved on 10 October. The recruits were to be drawn from Wales as well as Monmouthshire and from Welshmen living in Liverpool, London and Manchester. The creation of the corps soon became a source of dispute between Lloyd George and Kitchener and was never realised due to a lack of potential recruits. Llewelyn Wyn Griffith, an officer within the 38th (Welsh) Division, commented that "the population of Wales was not sufficient to raise two full divisions and all the corps units required". By the end of 1914, it had been decided that only one division would be raised. The 10,000 men, who had since joined the Welsh Army Corps, were formed into the 43rd Division of Kitchener's Fifth New Army. (Note: By 30 September, 50,000 Welshmen had joined the Army and had formed 12 new Welsh battalions within Kitchener's New Army and had also been used to reinforce existing units.) The division comprised the 113th, 114th and 115th Brigades, and was made up of battalions from the Royal Welsh Fusiliers (RWF), the South Wales Borderers (SWB) and the Welsh Regiment (Welsh). On 19 January 1915, Major-General Ivor Philipps was assigned as the first divisional commander. By March, 20,000 men had been enlisted and over the coming months the first units reached full strength. Despite steady recruitment, by 30 June 1915, 20 per cent of recruits had been removed, having been discharged primarily for medical reasons or transferred to other units leaving 27,836 men within the ostensible Welsh Army Corps. The division was made up predominately of Welshmen, but it included soldiers from the rest of the United Kingdom and several other nations.

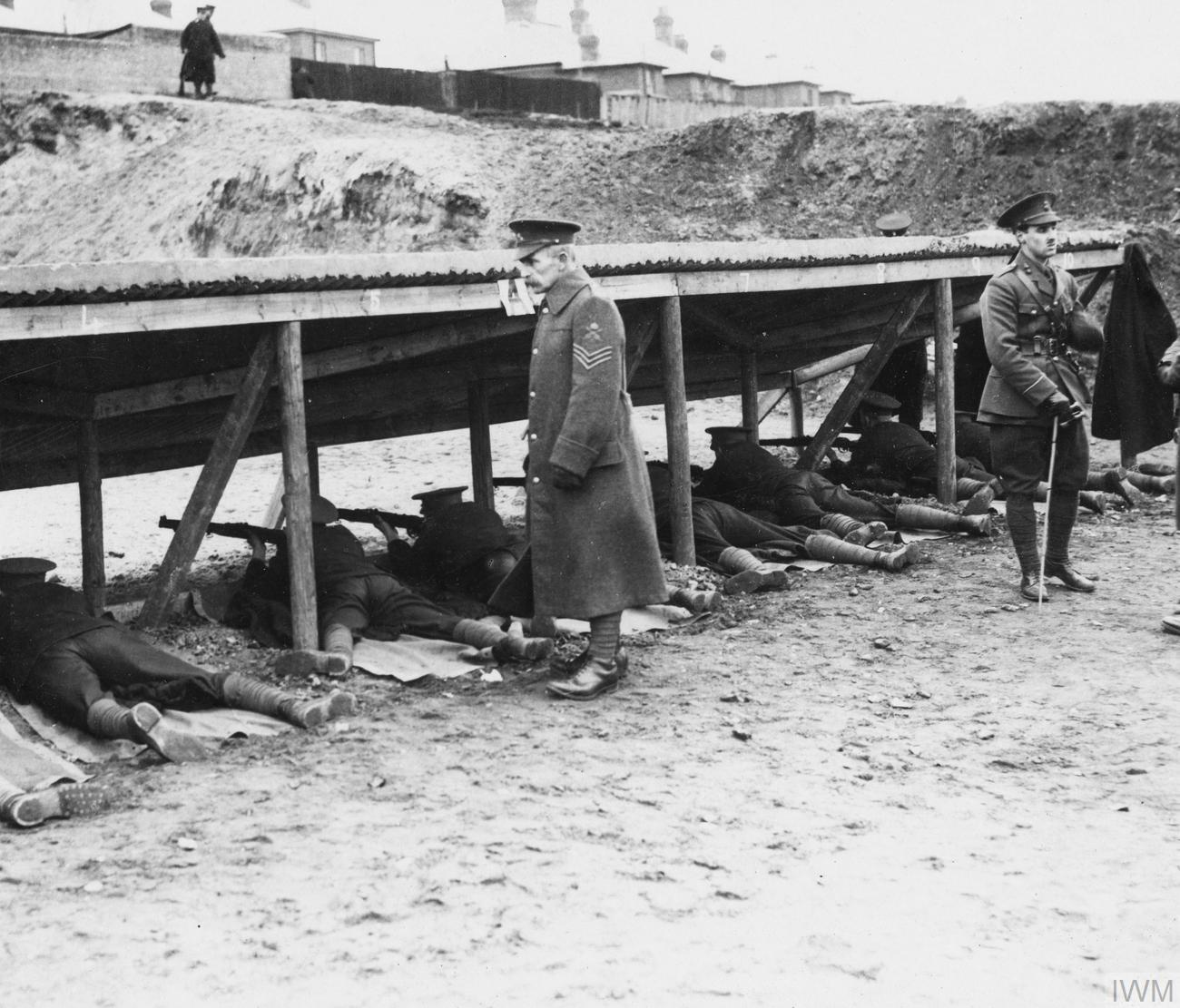
Elements of the Royal Welsh Fusiliers, training on a rifle range

On Saint David's Day (1 March 1915), the new division was inspected by Lloyd George. During April, the Fourth New Army was broken up to provide reinforcements for deployed combat units. The Fifth New Army, in turn, was renamed the Fourth New Army. As part of this re-organisation, the 38th Division became the 31st Division. On 29 April, the 43rd was renamed the 38th (Welsh) Division. The division spent most of 1915 dispersed, with the majority located across North Wales with units training at Pwllheli, Colwyn Bay, Llandudno and Rhyl; some units were based in the south at Abergavenny. At these locations, the men undertook basic training, were drilled, and trained for open warfare. On 19 August, the division moved to Winchester, England, where it assembled for the first time as a coherent single unit. Final training took place and limited instruction was given on tactics for trench warfare, on the assumption that practical experience would be easier to gain in France. Following training, it took until November for the division to be fully equipped with rifles. To be declared fit for overseas service, the division's soldiers had to fire 24 rounds on a rifle range. (Note: Pre-war regulars were held to the standard of the 1909 Musketry Regulations. This involved annual rifle training that included: firing 250 rounds at ranges of 100 yards (91 m)-600 yards (550 m), 15 rounds fired in a single minute at a target 300 yards (270 m) away, and a further exercise of firing 50 rounds at various ranges.) On 29 November, the division was inspected for the last time before its deployment; Queen Mary and Princess Mary reviewed the troops at Crawley Down.

Prior to its deployment, the division was roughly 18,500 men strong. During November, the division departed from Southampton and by 5 December it had arrived in France at Le Havre. The division's artillery initially remained behind to conduct live fire exercises at Larkhill, but had re-joined the division by the end of December.

The initial reaction by the regular army to the division was one of hostility. The division was seen as lacking experience and training; the latter was a criticism levelled at all New Army divisions. Questions were also raised about the divisional leadership and about securing officer commissions through influence. Historian Clive Hughes wrote, "regulars professed disgust at the blatantly political character" of the division. The prime example of this concern was Philipps himself. He had retired from the Indian Army in 1903 as a Major, and then joined the Pembroke Yeomanry becoming the regiment's Colonel in 1908. Prior to the war, Philipps was elected a member of parliament, and was part of Lloyd George's Liberal Party. Following the outbreak of the war, he was promoted to Brigadier-General and given a command of a brigade. He was then posted to Lloyd George's Minister of Munitions, before being given command of the 38th ahead of regular army officers who held seniority. Hughes commented that Philipps's political appointment "can hardly have improved his standing" and that he was viewed as a "jumped-up ex-Indian Army major who had no right to a divisional command", who had received his position via his association with Lloyd George.

=== Initial actions and the Battle of the Somme ===
Once in France, the division joined XI Corps and was placed in reserve, relieving the 46th (North Midland) Division. The first casualties were soon suffered due to training accidents with grenades. The division was then temporarily split up and spent time attached to the Guards Division and 19th (Western) Division, to gain experience in trench warfare. It relieved the 19th (Western) Division and until the summer manned the front in the Nord-Pas-de-Calais region. It was rotated along the XI Corps sector, and spent time in Festubert, Givenchy, La Gorgue, Laventie and Neuve Chapelle. Units of the division took turns on the front line, maintained positions, conducted trench raids and were subjected to German bombardments, all of which allowed the men to gain experience of active service conditions. During this period Captain Goronwy Owen of the 15th RWF carried out a trench raid into no man's land, where he located a party of German soldiers who had just finished laying barbed wire. Owen followed the Germans back to their trench and ambushed them. The divisional history comments that "the greater portion [of the German party] were killed" and the raid was considered by the Army to be "the third best ... carried out so far" in the war. For his actions, Owen was mentioned in dispatches.

Map of the Somme battlefield (click to enlarge). The village of Mametz and the surrounding woodland are centrally located.

During 10–11 June 1916, the division was relieved by the 61st (2nd South Midland) Division and moved into reserve. It then moved south and joined XVII Corps of the Third Army to train for the Battle of the Somme. New trenches were dug and the division made practice attacks on them using novel tactics: attacking in waves in conjunction with artillery and machine gun fire. Towards the end of the month, the division moved further south to the Somme valley. They then joined II Corps and were placed in reserve. The division was allocated to the second wave, which was intended to exploit the expected success of both the Third and Fourth Armies. After the breach of the German lines, the Reserve Army cavalry divisions would capture Bapaume. The 38th (Welsh) Division would then move forward to relieve the cavalry and secure the town, to allow the cavalry to advance north towards Arras.

1 July was the first day on the Somme and although it was behind the lines in reserve, the division suffered its first casualty of the battle due to German artillery fire. The 1 July attack was a disaster on the Fourth Army front, and total British losses amounted to 57,470 largely north of the Albert–Bapaume road. In particular, XV Corps attacked the villages of Fricourt and Mametz. Throughout the day, the 7th Division assaulted and captured Mametz. The 21st Division pushed into the German lines and flanked Fricourt to the north. Due to this move and the capture of Mametz, the Germans abandoned Fricourt; the two divisions advanced up to 2,500 yards (2,300 m) and suffered 7,500 casualties. Between these two villages were the entrenched German positions in Mametz Wood. These needed to be captured to allow XV Corps to advance further into German territory. More ground was gained in subsequent attacks, but German defences and rain hindered moves to clear Mametz Wood. Following casualties within the 7th Division, the 38th (Welsh) Division was attached to XV Corps to relieve the division and clear the wood.

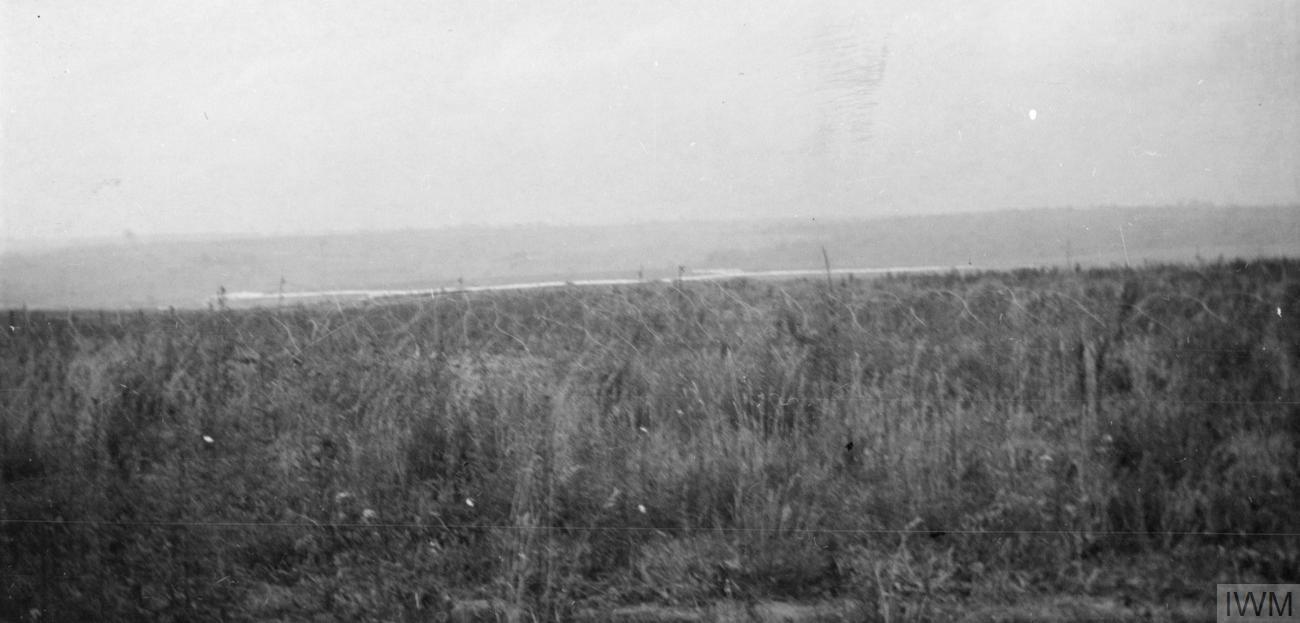
Mametz Wood, 7 July, prior to the fight to capture it

Mametz Wood was defended by elements of the German Lehr Infantry Regiment and 163rd Infantry Regiment. These units were entrenched within the wood; the German second line was only 300 yards (270 m) behind, allowing the position to be reinforced easily. From 6–9 July, the 38th Division conducted reconnaissance and probing attacks, to determine the strength of the German position.

On 7 July, the division launched two battalions upon the wood after a brief preliminary bombardment. At 08:00, the 16th Welsh and 10th SWB attacked. As soon as the advance began it became obvious that the preliminary bombardment had failed to silence the German machine gun positions and German shells started to fall upon the attackers and the trenches they had left, resulting in a temporary communication breakdown. Caught between machine gun fire from their front and their flanks, the attack bogged down within 200 yards (180 m) of the wood. Unable to move further, the troops were ordered to dig in to await a renewed British bombardment. At 11:00 the troops tried again but were unable to push further forward. A proposed third attack in the afternoon was called off. The 16th Welsh Battalion historian wrote that "'[c]ut to Ribbons' would be an apt description" as casualties amounted to 276 men. The 10th SWB suffered 180 casualties.

During the evening, the 14th RWF launched a minor trench raid. On 8 July, this was supposed to develop into an attack on the southern tip of the wood. While the division prepared to launch a battalion-sized attack, XV Corps commander Lieutenant General Henry Horne ordered a smaller attack by a platoon. The day was spent in confusion; conflicting orders were issued and Horne travelled to the division to clarify his intentions. In the end, no attack was launched.

When Horne found out that the 14th RWF had not moved and that their attack had been pushed back to 8 July, he summoned Ivor Philipps to Corps Headquarters and sacked him. General Douglas Haig, commander of the BEF, noted this event in his diary. He wrote: "visited HQ XV Corps and saw General Horne. He was very disappointed with the work of the ... 38th Welsh Div". Haig further commented that Philipps was relieved of his command as the majority of the division had "never entered" the woods despite the "most adequate ... bombard[ment]", had suffered "under 150 casualties" during their attack and that: "a few bold men [who had] entered the Wood found little opposition". Historian Don Farr wrote that Haig's entries are at odds with the facts and that he relied heavily on what Horne had told him. Farr states that Horne's account to Haig was self-serving, did no justice "to the difficulties confronting the troops on the ground", and did not acknowledge the failure of the bombardment. He also suggests that the sacking of Philipps may have been political, by a distrusting officer corps towards a perceived political appointee.

Hughes quoted a regular officer who was attached to the division who described Philipps as "an excellent administrator" who was "valued [for] his service with the division". Historian Tim Travers wrote that "perhaps Philipps was a poor commander" but the opening attacks on Mametz Wood demonstrated the faults of the entire command structure, not just of Philipps, as there was pressure from the top down to get results. Farr wrote that "there is evidence that ... Philipps ... balked at sending waves of [his] men unprotected against machine guns" and Travers wrote that Philipps had shown moral courage in cancelling unprepared attacks and for giving his troops "instructions not to press the attack if machine-gun fire was met". Horne had intended to replace Philipps with Major-General Charles Blackader but was overruled by Haig who ordered that Herbert Watts, commander of the 7th Division, was to take temporary command. During 9 July, the decision was made that the division would launch a full-scale attack the next day. At 03:30 on 10 July, the preliminary bombardment began.

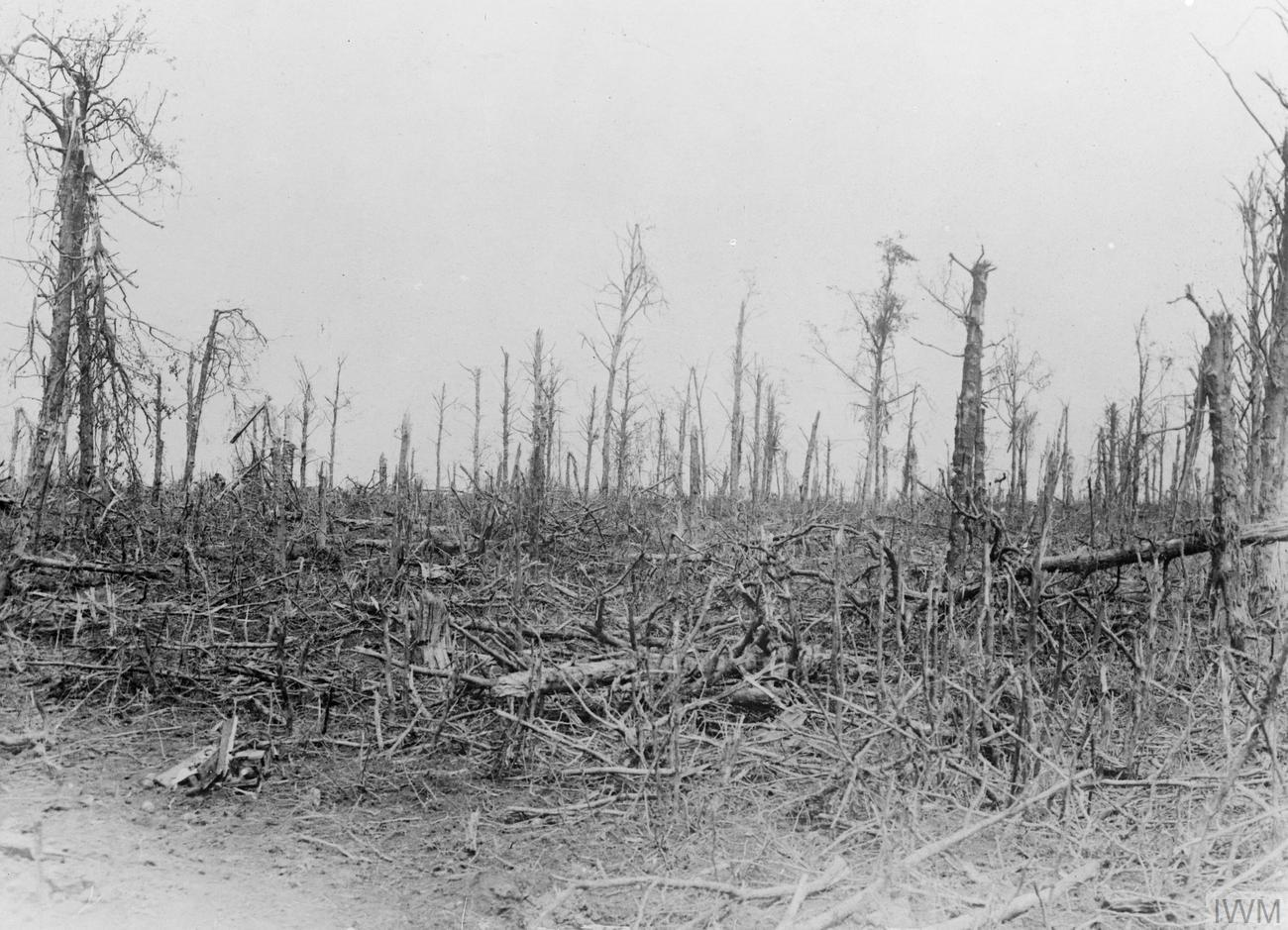
Mametz Wood, as seen in August

The initial bombardment lasted for 45 minutes, striking the German front line positions; the shelling was also temporarily halted to attempt to lure the German defenders back into the front line. At 04:15, the division launched its attack. Advancing behind a creeping barrage were the 13th Welsh (on the right flank), the 14th Welsh (in the centre) and the 16th RWF (on the left flank). A smoke screen had been laid down on either flank, which succeeded in drawing German fire away from the assault. The divisional history called this attack "one of the most magnificent sights of the war ... wave after wave of men were seen advancing without hesitation and without a break over a distance which in some places was nearly 500 yards".

The 14th Welsh rapidly entered the wood and cleared the German positions with bayonets and rifle fire. In the face of determined German resistance and flanking machine gun fire, the 13th Welsh suffered many casualties and their attack stalled. The division reinforced the right flank by committing the 15th Welsh who were able to push through into the wood. Before they could link up and aid the 13th, German troops infiltrated the gap between the two battalions, got behind the 15th Welsh and almost wiped out a company. These troops had to fight their way out, and just seven returned . Despite the losses, the three battalions of the Welsh regiment were able to form a cohesive line defending the edge of the wood and repulsed strong German counter-attacks. The 16th RWF, which had fallen behind the creeping barrage, were met with determined German resistance which repulsed two assaults. The 15th RWF was sent to reinforce and both battalions were then able to push their way into the wood where German resistance, including a machine gun, prevented a further advance.

The 10th Welsh moved up to cover the gap between the five battalions already engaged and the 13th RWF were deployed to clear the German position in front of their sister battalions; divisional engineers arrived to dig trenches and lay wire. During the afternoon, the 10th SWB and 17th RWF were committed to the wood. At 16:00, another attack began and met with little resistance. The 10th SWB captured the eastern stretches of the wood and inflicted many casualties on the Germans. The 15th Welsh, along with the 15th and 17th RWF, fought north through the wood and made it to within 40 yards (37 m) of the northern edge when they were thrown back by German fire. A further attack during the evening was called off and the troops were pulled back up to 300 yards (270 m) and ordered to dig in for the night.

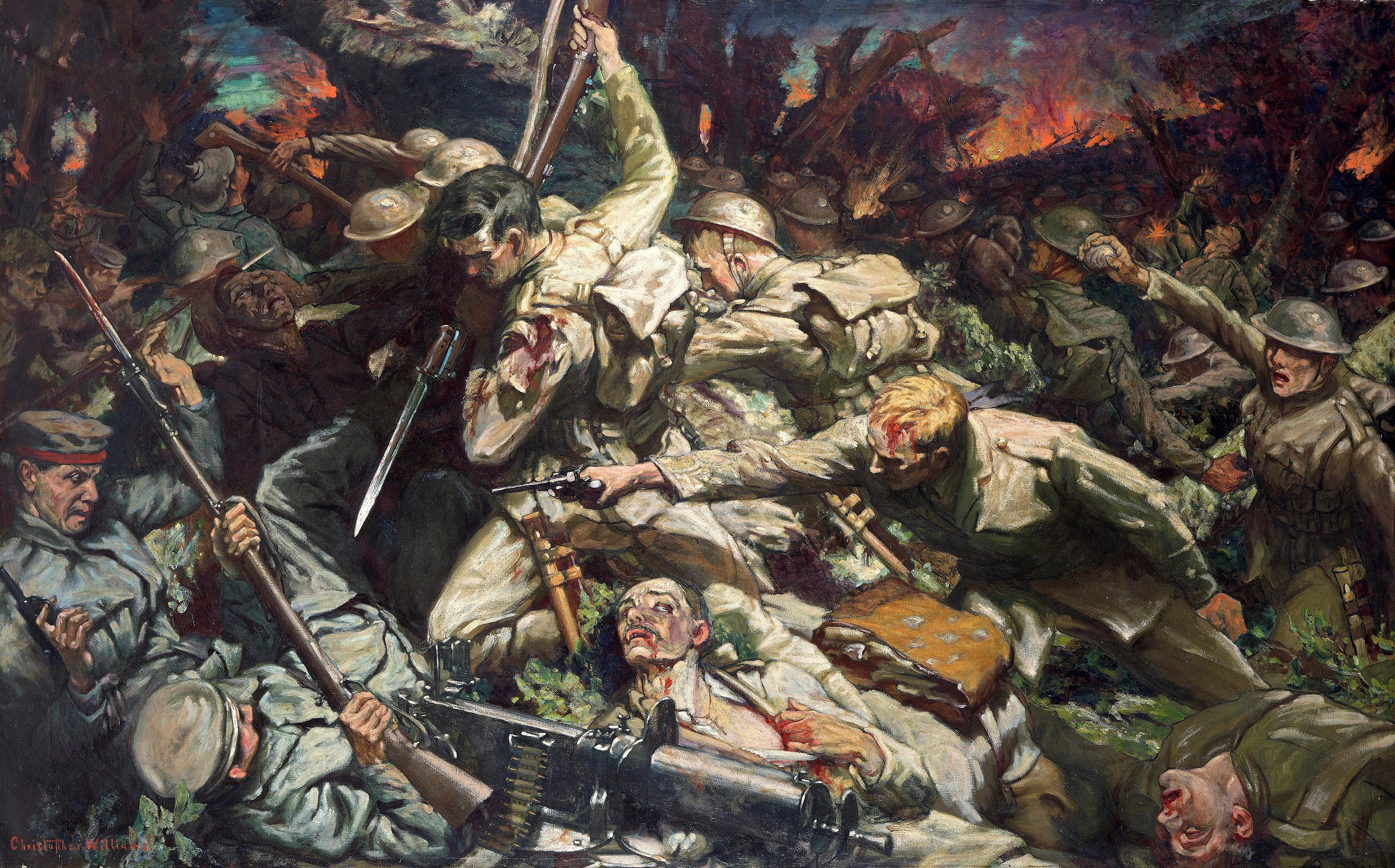
The Welsh at Mametz Wood by Christopher Williams depicting the division's assault to capture Mametz Wood

During the night, the 113th and 114th Infantry Brigades were ordered out of the wood and the 115th Brigade assembled in their place. The next day, the 115th Brigade prepared an assault to clear out the Germans. The 115th Brigade's commanding officer, Brigadier-General H. J. Evans, wanted to launch a surprise attack but was overruled. The subsequent bombardment to support the attack fell short in places, hitting British troops and provoking German artillery fire. As well as the friendly fire, the barrage also caught German troops in the open as they fled from the wood. The remaining Germans offered determined resistance and the 16th Welsh were held up by machine gun fire and the use of a flamethrower. Despite this, the brigade was able to clear Mametz Wood by the end of the day. The German second line position was on higher ground which dominated the edge of the wood and, coupled with artillery fire, resulted in the brigade pulling back to its start line to avoid further casualties.

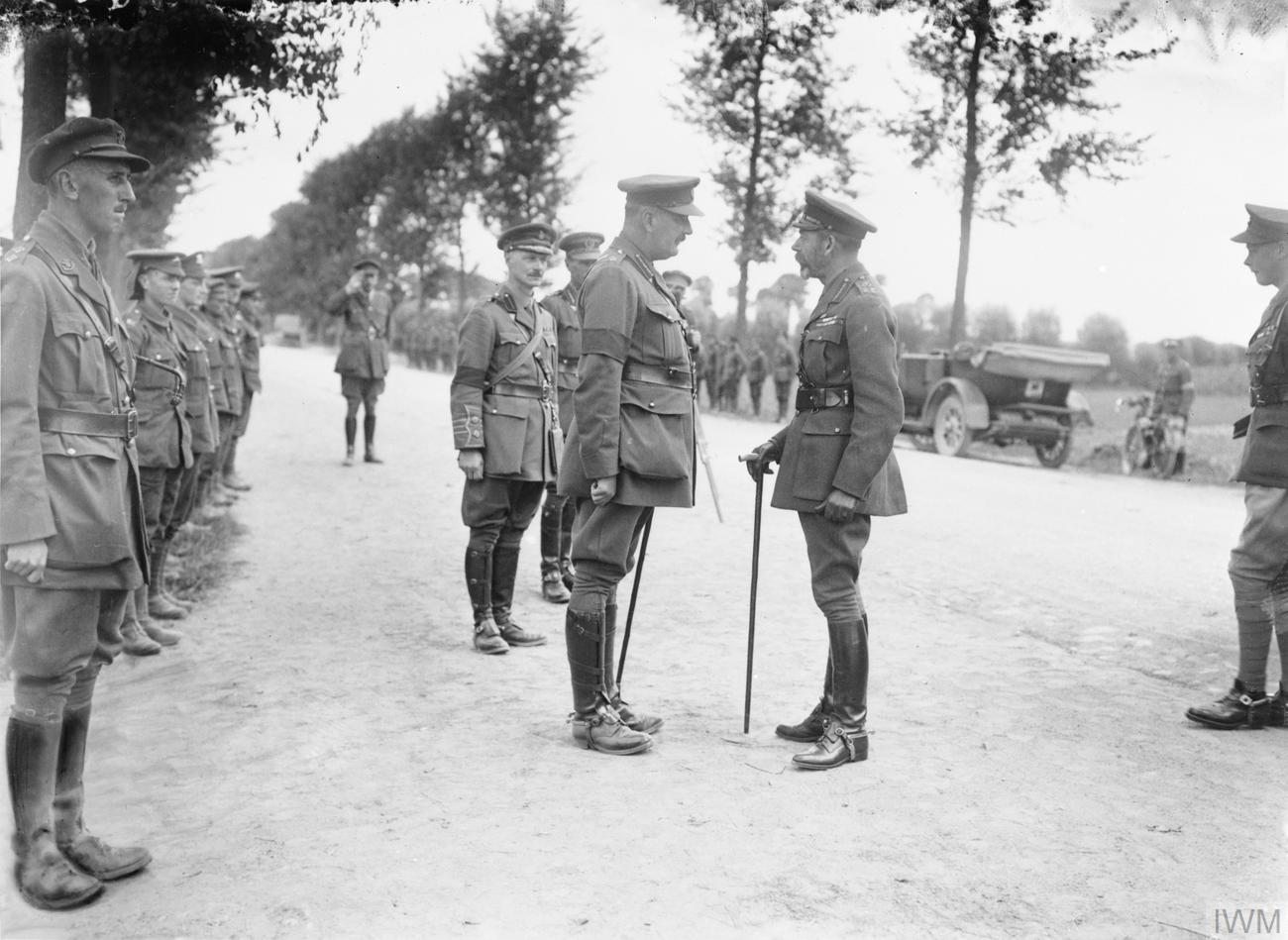
King George V (centre-right) speaks with Major-General Charles Blackader (centre-left) while visiting the division, 13 August 1916

That evening, the 21st Division relieved the 38th Division who moved near Gommecourt and relieved the 48th (South Midland) Division. On 12 July, Watts returned to the 7th Division and Blackader assumed command of the 38th. The division had suffered 3,993 casualties during the six days it had fought on the Somme, with over 600 men killed. Although it had captured 400 prisoners and Mametz Wood (the largest wood on the Somme), paving the way for the assault on Bazentin Ridge, the reputation of the division had been further hindered by inaccuracies. The failure of the first attack harmed the division's reputation, as the comparably few casualties were seen as evidence of a lack of determination by the men. The 113th Brigade's commander, Brigadier-General Price-Davies, made things worse by reporting panic among the men and refusals of orders. Price-Davies later wrote: "I may not have given my brigade full credit for what they did", but the damage had been done. The difficulty of wood fighting was not appreciated at the time, and Farr wrote that the reputation of the division suffered due to the repeated interference by Horne in matters best left to the divisional or brigade staff and his "inexperience of battlefield command at this level".

=== Ypres Salient ===
At the end of August 1916, the division was deployed to the Ypres Salient where it remained for the next ten months seeing no major action. The division spent its time rebuilding and consolidating washed out trenches and raiding German positions. For the former, the division was commended by their Corps commander Rudolph Lambart (XIV Corps). In November, elements of the 14th Welsh launched a large raid on a German position known as High Command Redoubt, a fortified position on a slight rise that overlooked the British lines. From this redoubt, the Germans had been able to direct artillery fire and snipe the British positions. The 14th Welsh raided the position, killing 50 defenders in hand-to-hand combat and taking 20 more as prisoners.

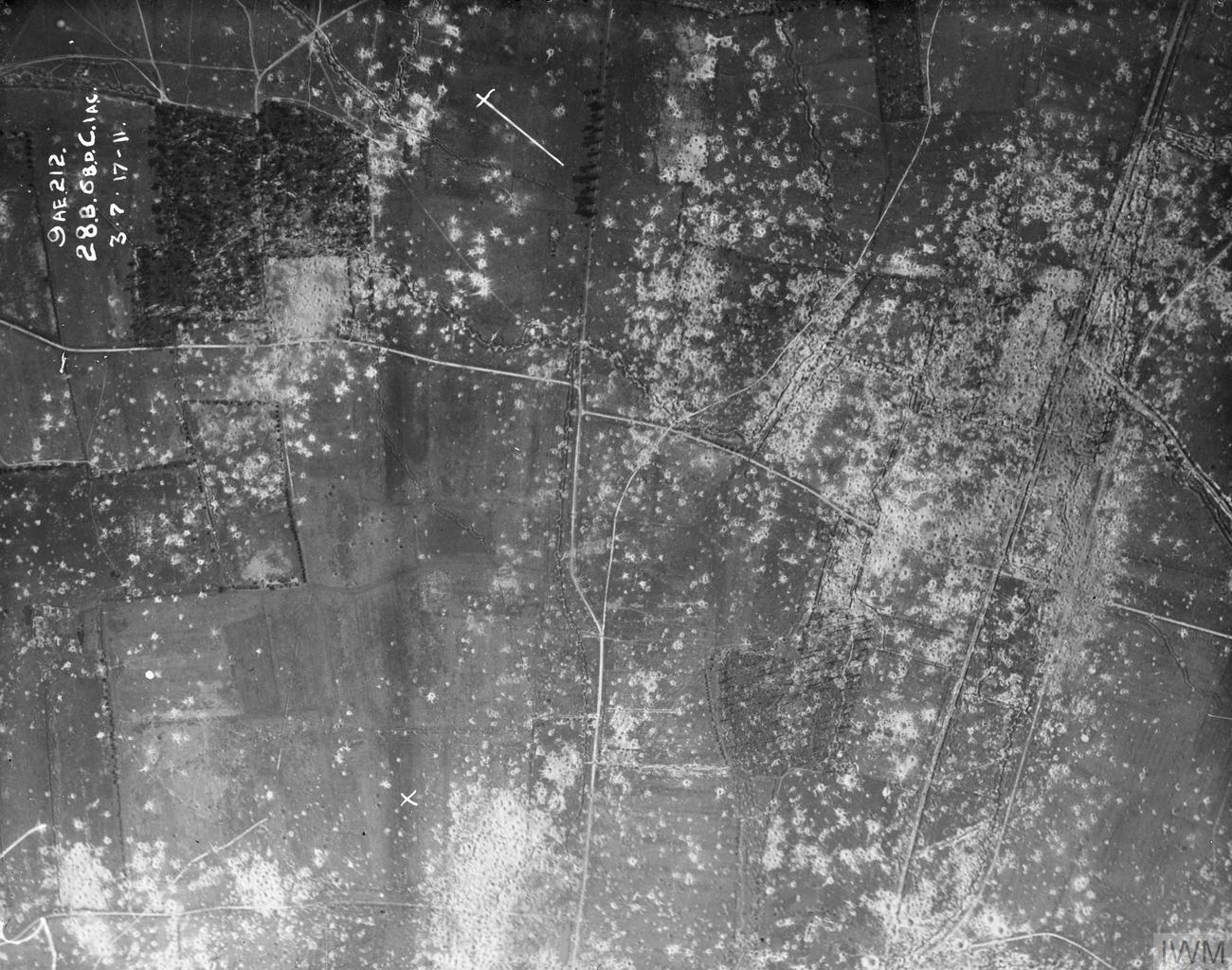
Aerial reconnaissance photo showing the cross west of Pilckem and the devastation of the ridge

In June, the division was withdrawn into reserve to conduct training exercises for the Ypres offensive. Replicas of the German positions on Pilckem Ridge were built and attacks rehearsed. On 20 July, the division returned to the front taking over from the 29th Division. Until the end of the month, the division was subjected to German artillery fire. These shells, a mixture of high explosive and mustard gas, inflicted serious losses. At the same time, aerial reconnaissance and infantry patrols by the division confirmed that the British preliminary barrage had forced the Germans back to their second line positions.

At 03:50 on 31 July, the Battle of Pilckem Ridge began. The division was ordered to capture the German front line, the second line positions based on Pilckem Ridge, a low ridge that also contained the heavily shelled village of Pilckem, followed by Iron Cross Ridge which lay to the east, before storming down the other side and across a small stream known as the Steenbeck. The division would be opposed primarily by the German 3rd Guards Infantry Division, along with elements of the 3rd Reserve Division and 111th Division, dug-in among trench lines and 280 concrete pillboxes and bunkers. To secure these various objectives, the division planned to attack in waves, with fresh troops constantly moving forward to tackle the next objective.

Due to the Royal Artillery gas bombardments, the German artillery had been largely silenced and played little part in the initial fighting. The 10th and 13th Welsh (advancing on the right) and half the 13th and 16th RWF (on the left), were able to take the German forward positions rapidly, capturing several Germans who had remained behind. The 13th and 14th Welsh then pushed beyond their sister battalions up the ridge, along with the remaining half of the 13th and 16th RWF. Based in the village and Marsouin and Stray Farms, the German resistance was more determined, resulting in increasing British losses. Arthur Conan Doyle, in his history of the war, described the scene:

The Germans poured bullets upon the advancing infantry, who slipped from shell-hole to shell-hole, taking such cover as they could but resolutely pushing onwards.

— Arthur Conan Doyle

It was during this stage of the fighting that James Llewellyn Davies earned the Victoria Cross (VC). Davies, alone, attacked a German machine gun position after previously failed efforts had resulted in numerous British deaths. He killed one German and captured another as well as the gun. Although he was wounded, he then led an attack to kill a sniper who had been harassing his unit. Davies subsequently died of his wounds.

Where concrete bunkers were encountered, the troops worked their way around them, cutting the German troops off and forcing them to surrender. Despite their resistance, the German second line was captured without delay. Half of the 13th and 14th Welsh, along with the 15th RWF, then pushed towards Iron Cross Ridge. German troops holding Rudolphe Farm, in the area allocated to the 51st (Highland) Division which had not yet advanced as far, were able to fire into the flanks of the advancing troops. A platoon from 15th Welsh was diverted and assaulted the farm, capturing 15 men and killing or scattering the rest, securing the flank of the advance. The 14th Welsh then rushed Iron Cross Ridge and engaged in hand-to-hand combat to seize the position, before pushing on to capture a dressing station. Their charge had resulted in heavy losses, but yielded 78 prisoners and three machine guns. The 15th RWF had fallen behind the protective creeping barrage to their front and came under fire from a German position known as Battery Copse. Despite many losses, they pushed forward and were able to secure their portion of Iron Cross Ridge.

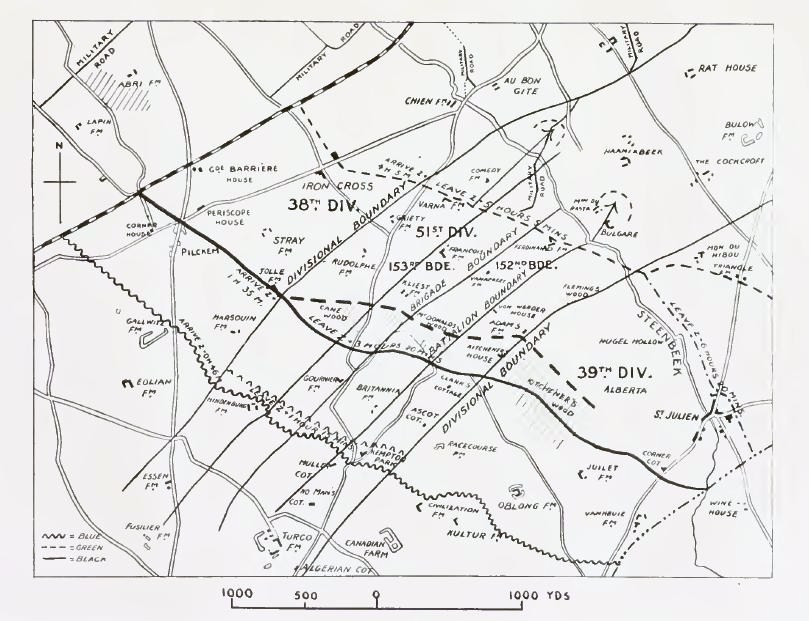
Attack of the 38th (Welsh) Division, Battle of Pilckem Ridge, 31 July 1917

With Iron Cross Ridge in British hands, the 11th SWB and 17th RWF pushed forward for the Steenbeck. Despite German resistance, based in more concrete defences, these positions were cleared and the river reached, and the two battalions dug-in on the opposite side. Helping to clear German positions during the advance, resulted in Ivor Rees being awarded the VC. Rees silenced one German machine gun position, before going on to clear a concrete bunker with grenades resulting in the death of five Germans and the surrender of 30 more and the capture of a machine gun. Due to the casualties taken, elements of the 16th Welsh and 10th SWB were moved forward to reinforce the newly gained position. At 15:10, the German infantry launched a counter-attack. Fighting continued throughout the day, with the forward British battalions forced to pull back beyond the Steenbeck; German attempts to retake further territory were thwarted. During the afternoon, heavy rain began to fall and did so for three days, hindering future operations. The fighting broke the 3rd Guards Division, which the Welsh divisional history notes "had to be withdrawn immediately after the battle". During the day, the division took nearly 700 prisoners. Conan Doyle places the division's losses at 1,300 men. Other than an exchange of artillery fire, no further fighting took place and the division was withdrawn from the line on 6 August.

Historian Toby Thacker wrote that "the attack on the Pilckem Ridge was considered a great success by Haig and has been similarly viewed by historians". He continues: "in Haig's eyes the Welsh Division had redeemed its reputation after what he had perceived as its poor showing at Mametz Wood". Haig went on to write that the division had "achieved the highest level of soldierly achievement". Historian Steven John wrote that the division "regained the honour which it had unjustly lost after their supposed tardiness in the capture of Mametz".

The division returned to the front line on 20 August. On 27 August, elements of the division attacked. Throughout the day, heavy rain had fallen saturating the ground. The divisional history described the scene: "the men who had been lying in shell-holes which were gradually filling with water found great difficulty in getting out and advancing and keeping up with the barrage". As the infantry waded through mud, they lost the creeping barrage. Elements of the division reached the German line, in what the historian of the 16 Welsh called "a gallant but hopeless endeavour". The division remained on the line, subjected to German artillery bombardments, until it was withdrawn on 13 September to take up new positions at Armentières.

=== Raiding and reorganisation ===
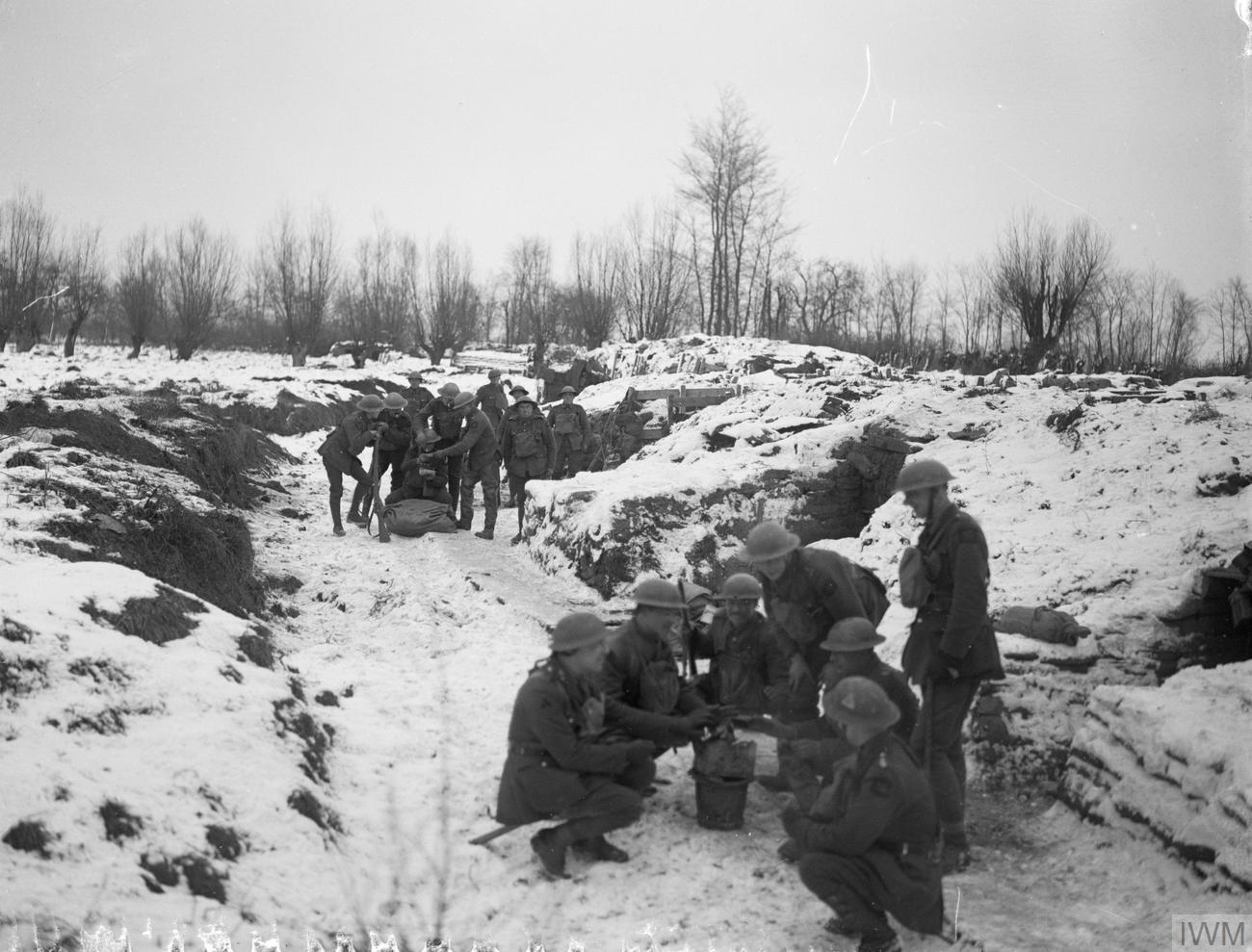
Men of the 15th RWF, outside their dug-outs, in the trenches, late December 1917.

Until early 1918, the division manned various sections of the front line, at times occupying as much as ten miles of the front. During this period, the division worked to improve the trenches they inherited and conducted raids on the German lines. On the night of 7/8 November, the 10th SWB conducted a 300-strong raid on the German lines. Having penetrated 200 yards (180 m) into German territory, the battalion destroyed three concrete dugouts, inflicted at least 50 casualties and took 15 prisoners, for a loss of 50 casualties. In addition to raiding, the division helped train the newly arrived 1st Portuguese Division by having a battalion assigned one at a time for tutoring. During the winter, the British realised that the Germans intended to begin an offensive in 1918 (the Spring Offensive) and the division spent the following months improving the front line positions, as well as constructing rear-line defences from the Armentières region to the northern bank of River Lys, laying what the divisional history described as an: "inconceivable amount of concrete and barbed wire".

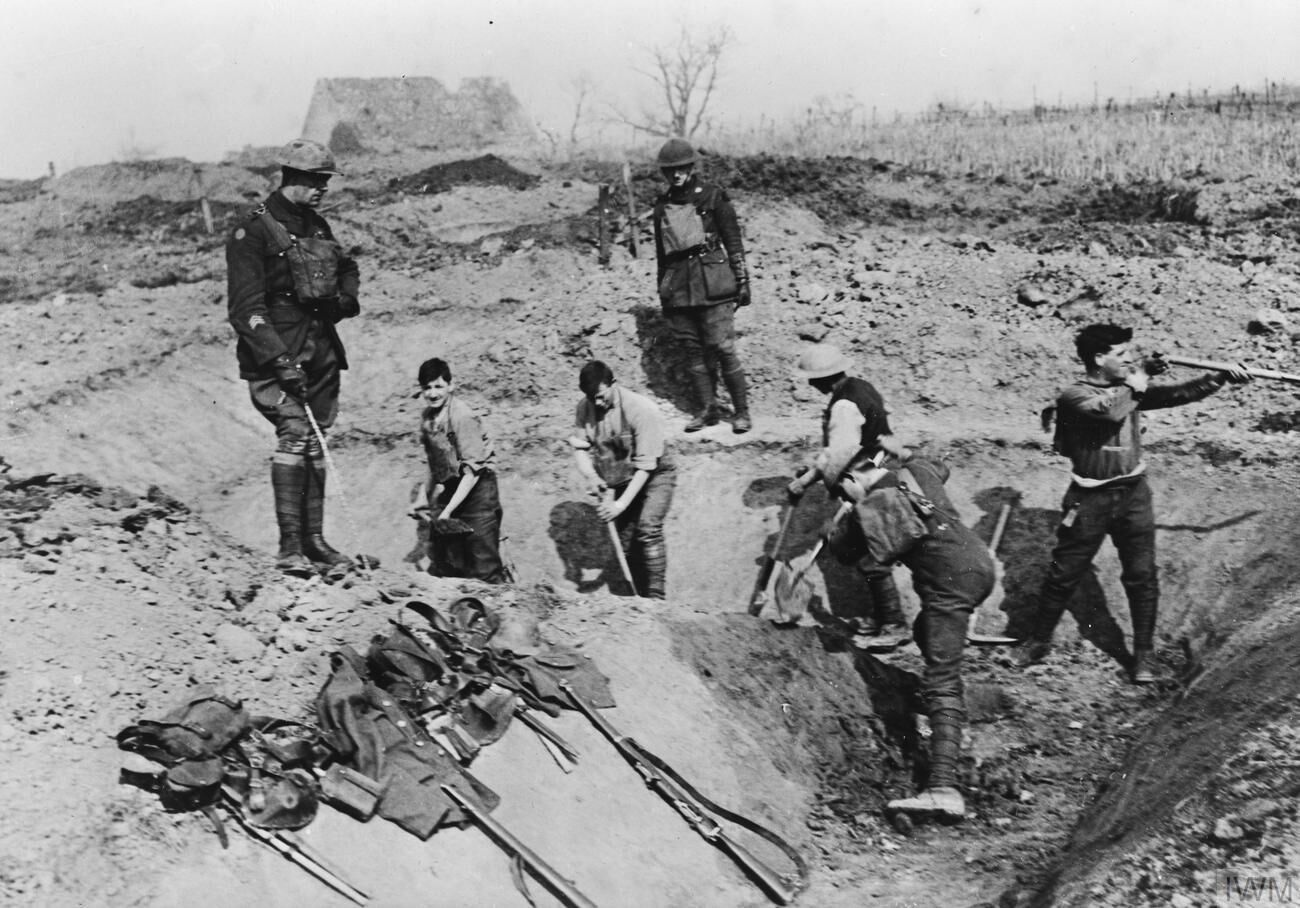
Men of the 13th Welsh constructing rear-line positions near Houplines

By 1918, the number of front line infantry within the British Army in France had decreased, leading to a manpower crisis. In an attempt to consolidate manpower and to increase the number of machine guns and artillery support available to the infantry, the number of battalions in a division was cut from twelve to nine. This had the effect of reducing the establishment of a division from 18,825 men to 16,035. In addition, to ease reinforcement, an attempt was made to consolidate as many battalions from the same regiment within the same brigade. These changes impacted the division, resulting in the 15th RWF, 11th SWB and 10th and 16th Welsh being disbanded and the 2nd RWF joining from the 33rd Division. These changes to the division also saw the machine gun companies consolidated into a single battalion, one medium mortar battery broken up and absorbed by the remaining two batteries and the heavy mortar battery leaving the division to become a Corps asset.

After a short break to train and rest, the division returned to the front line in mid-February and recommenced raiding the German lines. On 15 March, the 16th RWF conducted a raid on a similar scale, and with similar success, to the one conducted by the 10th SWB in November. During the same period, the Germans raided the British lines but managed to capture only two men. In addition, the division's snipers were able to gain the upper hand over their German rivals. The divisional history notes that its patrols had gained "control of No Man's Land". Using what had been learned "thorough previous reconnaissance", in addition to sniping, it was "possible to move about unmolested in exposed trenches or even in the open" in front of the German lines.

=== German Spring Offensive ===
On 21 March, Germany launched Operation Michael. This attack, which became the opening salvo of their Spring Offensive, aimed to deliver a single, decisive, war winning blow. The Germans intended to strike the southern British flank, to separate the British and French armies and then move north to engage the bulk of the British forces in France in a vernichtungsschlacht (battle of annihilation). The aim was to inflict such a defeat upon the British armies that the country would abandon the war, which in turn would force the French to sue for peace. After the first ten days of the German offensive, the casualties suffered by the 2nd and the 47th (London) Divisions were such that the 38th was ordered south to take up positions near Albert to relieve the two formations. The infantry moved south, and the divisional artillery remained at Armentières to support the 34th Division and subsequently took part in the Battle of the Lys. During this battle, the artillery went on to aid French forces before being transferred temporarily to the British 25th Division and conducting a fighting withdrawal. Its actions with both divisions earned the men of the divisional artillery plaudits from both divisional commanders.

Near Albert, the division had been kept in reserve until the night 11/12 April, when the division relieved the 12th (Eastern) Division. The Germans had captured high ground near Bouzincourt and Aveluy, overlooking the British lines. The division was ordered to retake this to deny the Germans the ability to observe the British positions and to gain observation positions overlooking the German lines in the Ancre valley. At 19:30 on 22 April, elements of the 113th and 115th Brigades attacked with support from Australian artillery. The German infantry, supported by a large number of machine guns and much artillery support, resisted the attack. Unable to drive the German infantry off all of the high ground, the division gained 250 yards (230 m) on a 1,000-yard (910 m) front, which achieved the objective. The 13th RWF managed to push further ahead and secured a section of high ground overlooking the German lines, fought off several German counter-attacks and took captive 85 Germans and six machine guns. The attack was costly, with the 13th RWF suffering over 400 wounded. The Germans made repeated attempts to push back the British and a big attack was repulsed on 9 May. The division attempted an abortive attack on another German-held ridge and conducted several raids on the German lines, before they were withdrawn for a short break on 20 May.

At this point, Major-General Charles Blackader left the division on medical grounds and was replaced by Major-General Thomas Cubitt. The division received replacements for casualties, disbanded the sniper company and engaged in rifle training. Once back on the line, the division returned to its previous routine of static warfare: conducting patrols and raids, as well as being subjected to raids and artillery bombardments.

=== Final battles ===
The division returned to the front, on 5 August, and took up position at Aveluy Wood. Shortly after, the Allied armies launched the Battle of Amiens, which led to the start of the Hundred Days Offensive, the culminating offensive of the war. In the 38th Division sector, the Fourth Army pushed the Germans back from their gains and onto the eastern bank of the Ancre. The 38th Division was assigned to cross the river and clear the German-held Thiepval ridge north of Albert.

On 21/22 August, elements of the 114th Brigade crossed the Ancre near Beaumont-Hamel, established a bridgehead, constructed a bridge and fought off German counter-attacks. The next day, further elements of the brigade crossed, securing a further bridgehead and repulsed more German attacks. The 113th Brigade crossed the river via bridges in Albert and assaulted Unsa Hill 1 mile (1.6 km) to the north-east, taking 194 prisoners, three artillery pieces and seven machine guns. The 115th Brigade crossed the river and cleared several German positions facing them, took at least 30 prisoners and captured 15 machine guns. The rest of the division crossed the following day, either wading or using the new bridges. During the early hours, the 114th Brigade launched an attack on Thiepval ridge while the other two brigades attacked Ovillers-la-Boisselle. By the end of the day, in heavy fighting, the division had seized the ridge, pushed the Germans back around Ovillers and taken 634 prisoners. The division history also records the capture of "143 machine guns".

The division then advanced across the old Somme battlefield, as part of the Second Battle of the Somme. On 25 August, the 113th Brigade cleared Mametz Wood, and the 115th seized Bazentin le Petit. The following day, the 113th Brigade reached the outskirts of Longueval. During the fighting, Henry Weale was ordered to suppress German machine gun positions with his Lewis Gun. The gun jammed, and on his own initiative he rushed the German position killing the crew before charging another that resulted in the German crew fleeing. His actions, which earned him the VC, helped the brigade secure its position. The brigade then fought off numerous counter-attacks while the 115th Brigade surrounded and cleared High Wood (near Bazentin le Petit). Divisional casualties amounted to around 800, and at least 100 prisoners were taken along with the capture of 15 machine guns. The next day saw heavy fighting outside Longueval as the 113th and 114th Brigades attempted to advance, but they were halted by determined German resistance and repeated counter-attacks. The following days saw an exchange of artillery fire and further German counter-attacks repulsed. Longueval was seized late on 28 August after a partial German withdrawal. The division continued its advance, overcame German resistance and counter-attacks to capture Ginchy, Deville Wood and Lesbœufs but were held up by determined resistance at Morval. Following a day-long barrage, Morval was captured on 1 September after heavy fighting and the division pushed on to take Sailly-Saillisel and Étricourt-Manancourt. In an effort to halt the British advance, the Germans had dug in on the far side of the Canal du Nord and, in the words of the divisional history, "smothered the Canal valley with gas shells". On 3 September, having noticed a weakness in the German positions, elements of the 13th and 14th Welsh stormed across the canal and cleared the eastern bank allowing the rest of the 114th Brigade to cross. On 5 September, the division was relieved and placed in reserve. During August and the beginning of September, the artillery had fired over 300,000 rounds in support of the fighting, 3,614 casualties had been suffered and 1,915 German prisoners taken.

On 11 September, the division returned to the line near Gouzeaucourt; the Germans had dug in along a ridge line from Épehy to Trescault intending to delay the British from reaching the Hindenburg Line. The Fourth Army was tasked with clearing these positions. On 18 September, the Battle of Épehy was fought. The division attacked at 05:40 with the 113th and 114th Brigades. For his role during the assault, William Allison White earned the VC. Alone, he assaulted a machine gun post that was hindering the advance, killing the defenders and capturing the gun. He then launched a second attack, accompanied by two others who were killed, to seize another German machine gun position killing a further five and again capturing the gun. In a third action, White led a small group to overwhelm a German defensive position that was also holding up the advance. He proceeded to organise the defence of the position, and fought off a German counterattack with heavy losses using captured machine guns. Both brigades were able to reach their objectives despite flanking fire, and fought off numerous counter-attacks. Despite this, the Germans were able to cling on to Gouzeaucourt. The battle cleared the German outposts in front of the Hindenburg Line, preparing the way for future operations. On 20 September, the division was pulled off the line for a period of rest.

Eight days later, the division returned in preparation for assaulting the Hindenburg Line. The division advanced, along with the Fourth Army, pressing the retreating Germans before halting at the Hindenburg support line, also known as the Le Catelet-Nauroy Line, due to determined German resistance. On 5 October, the line was breached by the division after the Germans evacuated it for their main position (Siegfried II Stellung, otherwise known as the Masnières-Beaurevoir line) near Villers-Outréaux. The German positions lay behind dense lines of barbed wire, supported by concrete pillboxes and machine gun positions hidden in small woods providing excellent fields of fire over otherwise open countryside. Faced with this level of defence, the division was halted and spent the following days reconnoitring the German positions preparing for an assault.

The division's plan of attack was for the 115th Brigade to envelop Villers-Outréaux during dark and assault the village during daylight with tank support, while the 113th Brigade would clear the nearby Mortho Wood. The 114th Brigade would be held in reserve initially but brought up to exploit the success and push deeper into the German defensive belt. At 01:00 on 8 October, the attack began. The initial attack by the 115th Brigade failed, in turn impeding the 113th Brigade, which was unable to approach Mortho Wood due to concentrated German machine gun fire. It was during this first attack, that Jack Williams earned his VC. Elements of the 10th SWB had come under heavy German machine gun fire and suffered numerous casualties. Williams directed a Lewis gunner to suppress the German position, while he assaulted it single-handedly. Rushing the position, he took the surrender of 15 Germans. When they realised Williams was alone they attempted to kill him and re-man their positions. After a brief clash, in which five Germans were bayoneted, the survivors again surrendered to Williams. In silencing the position, he alleviated the danger to his unit and allowed the battalion to resume the advance. The entire 115th Brigade soon rallied, and achieved their initial objective while the 113th were able to gain a foothold near theirs. At 05:00, the 2nd RWF – following a friendly fire incident – assaulted Villers-Outréaux and cleared the village with tank support. At 08:00, the 114th Brigade was committed to the battle as orders to delay the advance arrived late. The troops were held up by undetected barbed wire and heavy German fire until 11:30, when they disengaged and pressed forward exploiting the success of the 115th Brigade. The divisional history commented that the attack "progressed rapidly and resulted in a complete rout of the enemy" and that the brigade was able to achieve its final objective on the Prémont–Esnes road. Meanwhile, the 113th Brigade engaged in heavy fighting to clear the German trenches around Mortho Wood. During this action, the division suffered 1,290 casualties and took 380 prisoners. The divisional history noted that 8 October was "perhaps ... the stiffest fighting of the whole advance".

After the assault, the 33rd Division pursued the retreating German forces, while the 38th stayed close behind ready to take over the advance or assault strongly-held German positions as needed. On 9 October, Clary was liberated and the next day the divisional artillery was firing in support of the 33rd which had made contact with German forces. Over the next few days, the 33rd Division pursued the Germans to the River Selle and launched a bloody assault on the defended eastern bank during the opening stages of the Battle of the Selle. While a bridgehead was secured, it was abandoned due to losses and the 38th Division was moved forward. On the night of 13/14 October, the division took over the line near Troisvilles and Bertry. Over the next six days, the division prepared itself: conducting reconnaissance, constructing bridges and moving up heavy artillery. During these preparations, the Germans bombarded elements of the division's artillery with gas shells.

On the night of 19/20 October, the division attacked. The footbridges were brought forward and the river crossed with ease but, the divisional history commented, the "railway embankment on the far side was a much greater natural obstacle" due to heavy rain and was "heavily wired" and defended. The 113th and 114th Brigades crossed the river, each supported by a tank, while the 115th was held in reserve to deal with German counter-attacks. Despite heavy German resistance and the tanks becoming bogged down in mud, the troops were able to seize the rail line by 02:30. The divisional history commended the 14th Welsh for their efforts during this action, the first to secure a bridgehead and then rolling up the German line to secure the right flank of the attack. Major-General Cubitt described the attack: having "formed up in boggy ground, [the men] crossed a difficult river (for the fourth time since 21st August), attacked up a glacis swept by machine gun fire, stormed a precipitous railway embankment 40 to 50 feet high and in pouring rain, very slippery and deep going, in the hours of darkness, established [themselves] on the final objective". Elements of the division's pioneers joined in the assault on the heights beyond the river and aided in the capture of the position. Despite several counter-attacks, the division held the high ground. The attack inflicted at least 225 casualties and resulted in the capture of 212 prisoners, a battery of artillery pieces and mortars.

With a bridgehead across the Selle secured, the 33rd Division (again supported by the 38th's artillery) continued the advance with the 38th close behind. During this time, elements of the division supply train were stricken by an outbreak of Spanish flu. Following the 33rd, the division passed through the village of Forest, Croix-Caluyau and Englefontaine, before halting in front of the Forêt de Mormal. Here the division paused until 4 November and was subjected to artillery and aerial bombardments as well as minor skirmishes with German infantry. At 06:15 on 4 November, over a 2,000-yard (1,800 m) front, the 115th Brigade pushed forward subjected to a heavy German artillery bombardment. The brigade cleared fenced-off orchards before pushing 500 yards (460 m) into the forest against stiff resistance. They were followed by the 113th Brigade, who then leapfrogged ahead to achieve the division's second objective inside the forest. A lull in the fighting followed as the artillery was moved forward. Afterwards, the 114th Brigade attacked reaching the division's final objective, a road running through the forest, before nightfall. In heavy rain and complete darkness, the 13th Welsh carried on the advance. They surrounded the hamlets of Sarbaras and Tete Noir, capturing a garrison of 65 men, before pushing on towards Berliamont and taking 60 more prisoners. The division had breached the forest, allowing the 33rd Division to continue again advancing eastwards – this time to cross the Sambre. During this 24-hour period, the division had advanced 11.5 miles (18.5 km), 4 miles (6.4 km) further than the flanking divisions, taken 522 prisoners, captured 23 artillery pieces and suffered at least 411 casualties.

On 7 November, the division relieved the 33rd in the pursuit of the Germans. Taking over the line near Dourlers, the division pushed east. By 11:00 on 11 November, the leading brigade was east of Dimechaux with advanced patrols in contact with German forces at Hestrud on the Belgian border. From the start of the Hundred Day Offensive until the signing of the armistice on 11 November, the division had advanced 60 miles (97 km), taken 3,102 prisoners, seized 520 machine guns and captured 50 mortars and 43 artillery pieces. The division's own losses during this period amounted to 8,681 men.

Historian Gary Sheffield commented that, since the division was "employed on trench-holding duties from September 1917 to July 1918", it likely "was not regarded by GHQ as an elite 'storm' formation". He noted, "judged by the results of their attacks during the Hundred Days" the division "was in a select band of elite divisions" akin to the Australian, Canadian and a limited number of other British formations. Sheffield credited Cubitt, "a hard-bitten, ruthless 'fire-eater'", for the improved performance of the division during this period, along with the various breaks the division had away from the line when they were able to train and assimilate new knowledge that resulted in "devolution of command" which allowed command flexibility among lower ranks. In addition, Sheffield cited improved staff work and tactical doctrine and high morale, which had led to the ability of the division to carry out effective combined arms operations.

=== Epilogue ===
After the conclusion of fighting, the division was based around Aulnoye-Aymeries in France. The division was not chosen to be part of the British Army of the Rhine, the British occupation force to be based in the Rhineland. Instead, it was demobilised over a period of months. The first 3,000 soldiers were sent home during December, and the division ceased to exist by March 1919. Prior to the division's disbandment, the remaining men were visited by Edward Prince of Wales (later Edward VIII).

During the course of the war, 4,419 of the division's men were killed, 23,268 were wounded, and 1,693 reported missing. For acts of valour, five soldiers were (in some instances posthumously) awarded the Victoria Cross. In addition, the following awards (in several cases, multiple times) were bestowed: 86 Distinguished Service Orders, 447 Military Crosses, 254 Distinguished Conduct Medals, and 1,150 Military Medals; 453 men were mentioned in dispatches.

=== Battle Insignia ===
The practice of wearing battalion specific insignia (often called battle patches) in the B.E.F. began in mid 1915 with the arrival of units of Kitchener's Armies and was widespread after the Somme Battles of 1916. The patches shown were adopted by the division during late 1917, and were designed to a brigade scheme of a simple shape for each brigade and a colour for the battalion (the colours and design changed for the 115th brigade). Originally worn at the top of both sleeves, the battle patch was retained on the left when the division sign began to be worn on the right.

From left to right, top row: 13th, 14th and 15th and 16th (Service) Battalions Royal Welsh Fusiliers. Bottom row: 113th machine gun company and 113th trench mortar battery. The title 'LONDON WELSH' was written in one line for other ranks and two lines for officers.
From left to right, top row: 10th, 13th, 14th and 15th (Service) Battalions Welsh Regiment. Bottom row: 114th machine gun company and 114th trench mortar battery.
From left to right, top row: 17th (Service) Battalion Royal Welsh Fusiliers, 10th, 11th (Service) Battalions South Wales Borderers and 16th (Service) Battalion Welsh Regiment. Bottom row: 115th machine gun company and 115th trench mortar battery.
19th (Service) Battalion Welsh Regiment, the division pioneers.

== Second World War ==
=== Background ===
During the 1930s, tensions increased between Germany and the United Kingdom and its allies. In late 1937 and throughout 1938, German demands for the annexation of Sudetenland in Czechoslovakia led to an international crisis. To avoid war, the British Prime Minister Neville Chamberlain met with German Chancellor Adolf Hitler in September and brokered the Munich Agreement. The agreement averted a war and allowed Germany to annex the Sudetenland. Although Chamberlain had intended the agreement to lead to further peaceful resolution of issues, relations between both countries soon deteriorated. On 15 March 1939, Germany breached the terms of the agreement by invading and occupying the remnants of the Czech state.

On 29 March, British Secretary of State for War Leslie Hore-Belisha announced plans to increase the Territorial Army (TA), the reserve of the regular army made up of part-time volunteers, from 130,000 to 340,000 men and double the number of TA divisions. (Note: By 1939, the TA's intended role was to be the sole method of expanding the size of the Army (compared to the creation of Kitchener's Army during the prior war). First-line territorial formations would create a second-line division using a cadre of trained personnel and, if needed, a third division would be created. All TA recruits were required to take the general service obligation: if the British Government decided, territorial soldiers could be deployed overseas for combat. (This avoided the complications of the Territorial Force, whose members were not required to leave Britain unless they volunteered for overseas service.)) The plan was for existing units to recruit over their establishments, aided by an increase in pay for Territorials, the removal of restrictions on promotion which had hindered recruiting, the construction of better-quality barracks, and an increase in supper rations. The units would then form second-line divisions from cadres which could be increased. The 38th (Welsh) Infantry Division was created as a Second-Line unit, a duplicate of the First-Line 53rd (Welsh) Infantry Division. In April, limited conscription was introduced. This resulted in 34,500 20-year-old militiamen being conscripted into the regular army, initially to be trained for six months before deployment to the forming second-line units. It was envisioned that the duplicating process and recruiting the required numbers of men would take no more than six months. Some TA divisions had made little progress by the time the Second World War began; others were able to complete this work within a matter of weeks. Issues arose from the lack of central guidance, in addition to the lack of facilities, equipment, and instructors.

=== Formation and home defence ===
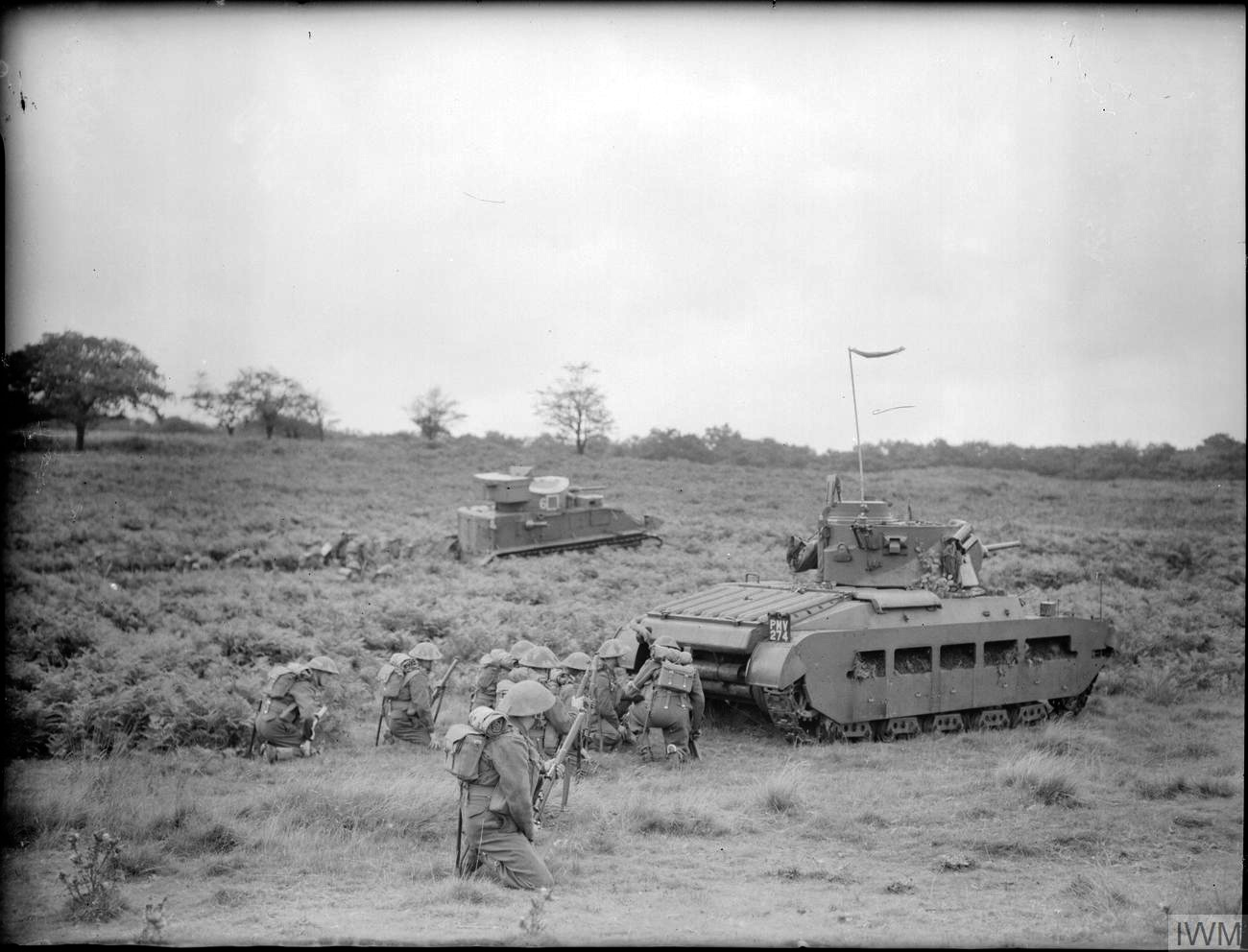
Elements of the division, the 5th Battalion, King's Shropshire Light Infantry, training near Liverpool. An infantry section shelter behind a Matilda II as a Vickers Medium Mark II moves past in the background.

The 38th (Welsh) Infantry Division became active on 18 September 1939; its constituent units had already formed and had been administered by the 53rd (Welsh) Infantry Division. The 38th was again composed of the 113th, 114th and 115th Infantry Brigades, and was placed under the initial command of Major-General Geoffrey Raikes.

In May, Major-General A. E. Williams assumed command. The division was initially assigned to Western Command, and by early 1940 was spread out along the River Severn in England and Wales. By summer, the division was under the command of III Corps and was based in North West England, around Liverpool, to conduct manoeuvres and training.

The war-time deployment of the Territorial Army envisioned it being deployed piecemeal, to reinforce the regular army already deployed to the European mainland, as equipment became available. The plan envisioned the deployment of the whole force in waves, as divisions completed their training, with the final divisions being deployed a year after the outbreak of war. As a result, the division did not leave the United Kingdom as the British Expeditionary Force (BEF) was evacuated from France during May and June 1940. On 28 October, Major-General Noel Irwin, who had commanded the 2nd Infantry Division during the latter stages of the fighting in France, was given command of the 38th.

In April 1941, the division was assigned to IV Corps and had moved to Sussex, the 18th Infantry Division having replaced them around Liverpool. In Sussex, the division was held in reserve and placed behind the 47th (London) Infantry Division and the 55th (West Lancashire) Infantry Division which were defending the coast between Bognor Regis – in the west – to Beachy Head in the east. Michael Glover and Jonathan Riley note that while in reserve, the Royal Welch Fusiliers battalions of the 115th Brigade took part in coastal defence duties.

On 15 November 1941, Major-General Arthur Dowler took command of the division. On 1 December 1941, the division was placed on the lower establishment, having been earmarked for a static home defence role. (Note: In comparison, higher establishment formations were intended for deployment overseas and combat.) During 1942, the division was assigned to V Corps and had shifted west to defend the Dorset coastline. On 27 and 28 February, the anti-aircraft platoon of the 4th Battalion, Monmouthshire Regiment, supported Operation Biting, the commando raid on Bruneval, France. On 23 April 1942, Major-General D. C. Butterworth was given command of the division. In July, the division lost the 10th Royal Welch Fusiliers to the Parachute Regiment. The division spent 1943 and early 1944 moving around the country spending time in Kent, Hertfordshire and Northumberland, and were assigned to II and XII Corps. In February 1944, 38th Division provided part of the 'enemy' force in Exercise Eagle, a 12-day pre-invasion training exercise held on the Yorkshire Wolds for VIII Corps, which was to form part of 21st Army Group in the forthcoming Allied invasion of Normandy (Operation Overlord). By March, the 115th Infantry Brigade had formed "'B' Marshalling Area" and was aiding the movement of troops in preparation for Overlord.

The 38th (Welsh) Infantry Division's Second World War shoulder badge, based on the flag of Saint David

By 1944, there were five lower establishment divisions allocated to home defence duties: the 38th, the 45th, the 47th (London), the 55th (West Lancashire) and the 61st Infantry divisions. These five divisions had a combined total of 17,845 men. Of this number, around 13,000 were available as replacements for the 21st Army Group fighting in France. (Note: The war establishment – the paper strength – of a higher establishment infantry division in 1944 was 18,347 men.) The remaining 4,800 men were considered ineligible for service abroad at that time for a variety of reasons, including a lack of training, or being medically unfit. Over the next six months, up to 75 per cent of these men would be deployed to reinforce 21st Army Group after the completion of their training and certification of fitness. Specifically, the vast majority of the 1st Brecknockshire Battalion, South Wales Borderers were deployed to Normandy at the end of June as replacements to reinforce 21st Army Group, and by mid-July so had the 2nd Battalion, Herefordshire Light Infantry, resulting in that battalion being disbanded. Historian Stephen Hart commented that, by September, 21st Army Group "had bled Home Forces dry of draftable riflemen" after the losses suffered during the Battle of Normandy, leaving the army in Britain, with the exception of the 52nd (Lowland) Infantry Division, with just "young lads, old men and the unfit".

Compounding the loss of men to reinforce 21st Army Group, on 3 July the 115th Infantry Brigade was withdrawn from the division. The brigade was earmarked for an operation to liberate the Channel Islands and was re-designated Force 135. Ultimately such an operation did not take place and the brigade was deployed to mainland Europe. During August, the 38th (Welsh) Infantry Division began to disperse. On 15 August, the divisional headquarters ceased commanding any subordinate units and by the end of the month the division was disbanded.

=== Training ===
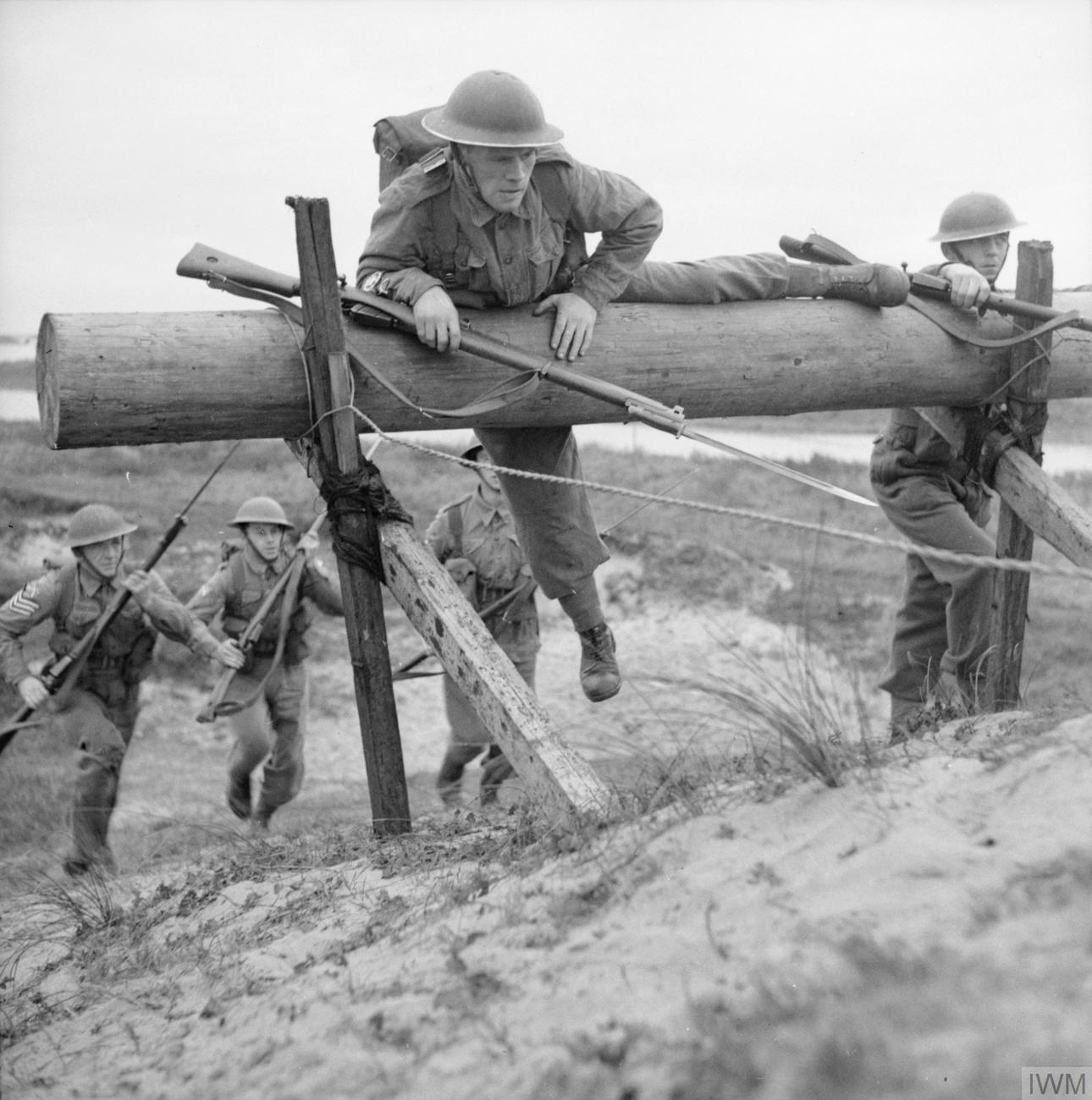
An example of infantry training at Western Command's training school

During 1944, the British Army suffered a severe shortage of manpower. In an effort to downsize the army and consolidate as many men within as few formations as possible to maintain fighting strength and efficiency, the War Office began disbanding divisions, including the 80th Infantry (Reserve) Division. As part of this restructure, the decision was made to retain division numbers familiar to the British public. On 1 September 1944, the 38th Division was recreated as the 38th Infantry (Reserve) Division to replace the 80th as Western Command's training formation. The new 38th Division was commanded by Major-General Lionel Howard Cox, who had previously commanded the 80th Division. At this point, the divisional insignia was worn only by the permanent members of the division.

The 38th, along with the 45th Holding, the 47th Infantry (Reserve) and the 48th Infantry (Reserve) Division, were used to complete the training of new army recruits. (Note: Having entered military service, a recruit was assigned to the General Service Corps. They would then undertake six weeks training at a Primary Training Centre and take aptitude and intelligence tests. The recruit would then be posted to a Corps Training Centre that specialised in the arm of the service they were joining. For those who would be joining the infantry, Corps training involved a further sixteen week course. For more specialised roles, such as signallers, it could be up to thirty weeks.) At the division, the soldiers were given five weeks of further training at the section, platoon and company level, before undertaking a final three-day exercise. Troops would then be ready to be sent overseas to join other formations.

Undertaking this role, for example, the 5th Battalion, King's Shropshire Light Infantry – between 1944 and 1945 – trained over 4,000 replacements for other battalions within the regiment as well as the North Staffordshire Regiment. Having fulfilled its purpose, the division was disbanded at the end of the war. When the TA was reformed in 1947, the division was not re-raised. (Note: In 1947, the TA was reformed with the 16th Airborne Division, the 49th (West Riding) and the 56th (London) Armoured Divisions, and the following infantry divisions: the 42nd (Lancashire), the 43rd (Wessex), the 44th (Home Counties), the 50th (Northumbrian), the 51st/52nd (Scottish), and the 53rd (Welsh).)

== General officers commanding ==
The division had the following commanders during the First World War:

Appointed	General officer commanding
19 January 1915	Major-General I. Philipps (Fired from position)
9 July 1916	Major-General H. E. Watts (temporary)
12 July 1916	Major-General C. G. Blackader
22 October 1917	Brigadier-General E. W. Alexander VC (temporary)
17 November 1917	Brigadier-General W. A. M. Thompson (acting)
22 November 1917	Major-General C. G. Blackader (Left position due to becoming sick)
20 May 1918	Brigadier-General H. E. ap Rhys Pryce (acting)
23 May 1918	Major-General T. A. Cubitt

The division had the following commanders during the Second World War:

Appointed	General officer commanding
18 September 1939	Major-General G. T. Raikes
11 May 1940	Major-General A. E. Williams
28 October 1940	Major-General N. M. S. Irwin
7 November 1941	Brigadier A. E. Robinson (acting)
15 November 1941	Major-General A. A. B. Dowler
8 April 1942	Brigadier A. E. Robinson (acting)
23 April 1942	Major-General D. C. Butterworth
1 September 1944	Major-General L. H. Cox

== Orders of battle ==
38th (Welsh) Division (1914–1918)

113th Brigade

- 13th (Service) Battalion, Royal Welsh Fusiliers (1st North Wales)
- 14th (Service) Battalion, Royal Welsh Fusiliers (Caernarvon and Anglesey)
- 15th (Service) Battalion, Royal Welsh Fusiliers (1st London Welsh) (disbanded on 6 February 1918)
- 16th (Service) Battalion, Royal Welsh Fusiliers
- 113th Machine Gun Company (joined 19 May 1916, moved to 38th Battalion, Machine Gun Corps on 2 March 1918)
- 113th Trench Mortar Battery (from 26 December 1915)

114th Brigade

- 10th (Service) Battalion, Welsh Regiment (1st Rhondda) (disbanded on 7 February 1918)
- 13th (Service) Battalion, Welsh Regiment (2nd Rhondda)
- 14th (Service) Battalion, Welsh Regiment (Swansea)
- 15th (Service) Battalion, Welsh Regiment (Carmarthenshire)
- 114th Machine Gun Company (joined 19 May 1916, moved to 38th Battalion, Machine Gun Corps on 2 March 1918)
- 114th Trench Mortar Battery (from 26 December 1915)

115th Brigade

- 17th (Service) Battalion, Royal Welsh Fusiliers (2nd North Wales)
- 10th (Service) Battalion, South Wales Borderers (1st Gwent)
- 11th (Service) Battalion, South Wales Borderers (2nd Gwent) (disbanded on 27 February 1918)
- 16th (Service) Battalion, Welsh Regiment (Cardiff City) (disbanded on 6 February 1918)
- 2nd Battalion, Royal Welsh Fusiliers (joined from 19th Brigade, 33rd Division on 6 February 1918)
- 116th Machine Gun Company (joined 19 May 1916, moved to 38th Battalion, Machine Gun Corps on 2 March 1918)
- 116th Trench Mortar Battery (from 26 December 1915)

Mounted Troops

- HQ, MG Section and D Squadron, Royal Wiltshire Yeomanry (joined the division at Winchester, joined III Corps Cavalry Regiment on 9 May 1916)
- 38th Divisional Cyclist Company (formed on 22 April 1915, joined XI Corps Cyclist Battalion on 10 May 1916)

38th (Welsh) Divisional Artillery

- Royal Field Artillery
  - CXIX Brigade
    - A Battery (previously No 2 Battery, formed at Porthcawl January 1915)
    - B–D Batteries (formed March–April 1915)
    - CXIX Brigade Ammunition Column
  - CXX Brigade
    - A Battery (previously No 1 Battery, formed at Cardiff in 1914)
    - B–D Batteries (formed March–April 1915)
    - CXX Brigade Ammunition Column
  - CXXI Brigade
    - A Battery (previously No 4 Battery, formed at Porthcawl January 1915)
    - B–D Batteries (formed March–April 1915)
    - CXXI Brigade Ammunition Column
  - CXXII (Howitzer) Brigade
    - A Battery (previously No 3 Battery, formed at Porthcawl January 1915)
    - B–D Batteries (formed March–April 1915)
    - CXXII Brigade Ammunition Column
  - 38th Divisional Ammunition Column
- Royal Garrison Artillery
  - 38th (Welsh) Heavy Battery (was raised for the division but left before June 1915; it later went to France in 1916 as part of XLII Heavy Artillery Group)
- 38th Divisional Trench Mortar Batteries
  - V/38 Heavy Trench Mortar Battery (formed by 28 July 1916; left on 9 February 1918)
  - X/38, Y/38 and Z/38 Medium Mortar Batteries (formed by April 1916; on 9 February 1918 Z was absorbed by X and Y)

Royal Engineers

- 123rd Field Company
- 124th Field Company
- 151st Field Company
- 38th (Welsh) Divisional Signal Company

Pioneers

- 19th (Service) Battalion, Welsh Regiment (Glamorgan)

Machine Gun Units

- 176th Machine Gun Company (joined 28 March 1917, moved to 38th Battalion, Machine Gun Corps on 2 March 1918)
- 38th Battalion, Machine Gun Corps (formed 2 March 1918 with 113th, 114th, 115th and 176th Companies)

Medical and Veterinary

- 129th Field Ambulance, Royal Army Medical Corps
- 130th Field Ambulance, Royal Army Medical Corps
- 131st Field Ambulance, Royal Army Medical Corps
- 49th Mobile Veterinary Section Army Veterinary Corps
- 77th Sanitary Section, Royal Army Medical Corps (joined the division in England; left for VIII Corps on 9 April 1917)
- 38th Divisional Motor Ambulance Workshop (joined on 7 February 1917; absorbed in Divisional Supply Column on 2 to 9 April 1916)

Divisional Train, Army Service Corps

- 330th Company
- 331st Company
- 332nd Company (Herbert Kitchener's New Army)
- 333rd Company

Others

- 235th Divisional Employment Company (formed by 23 June 1917)

38th (Welsh) Infantry Division (1939–1944)

113th Infantry Brigade (until 18 January 1944, disbanded 5 September 1944)

Main article: 113th Infantry Brigade
- 15th Battalion, Welch Regiment
- 2/5th Battalion, Welch Regiment
- 4th Battalion, Monmouthshire Regiment (until 12 December 1942, when it became the 1st Battalion, South Wales Borderers)
- 1st Battalion, South Wales Borderers (until 30 November 1943, then from 21 January 1944 until division was disbanded)
- 113th Infantry Brigade Anti-Tank Company (from 1 January 1940 until 6 January 1942)

114th Infantry Brigade (until 19 July 1944, disbanded 20 July)

Main article: 114th Infantry Brigade
- 5th Battalion, King's Shropshire Light Infantry
- 1st Brecknockshire Battalion, South Wales Borderers
- 2nd Battalion, Herefordshire Light Infantry
- 114th Infantry Brigade Anti-Tank Company (from 10 July 1940 until 9 January 1942)

115th Infantry Brigade (until 3 July 1944)

Main article: 115th Infantry Brigade
- 8th (Denbighshire) Battalion, Royal Welch Fusiliers (until 4 July 1944)
- 9th (Caernarvonshire and Anglesey) Battalion, Royal Welch Fusiliers (until 11 October 1943)
- 10th (Merionethshire and Montgomeryshire) Battalion, Royal Welch Fusiliers (until 25 July 1942, when it became 6th (Royal Welch) Parachute Battalion)
- 13th Battalion, Royal Welch Fusiliers (from 7 October 1942 until 4 July 1944)
- 9th Battalion, Somerset Light Infantry (from 24 October 1943 until 4 July 1944)
- 115th Infantry Brigade Anti-Tank Company (1 September 1940 until 12 January 1942)

Divisional Troops

- 38th Divisional artillery, Royal Artillery
  - 102nd Field Regiment (until 23 November 1941)
  - 132nd (Welsh) Field Regiment (until 15 July 1942)
  - 146th Field Regiment (until 13 May 1942)
  - 183rd Field Regiment (from 4 July 1942 until 4 April 1943)
  - 182nd Field Regiment (from 2 January 1943 until 14 August 1944)
  - 193rd Field Regiment (22 May 1943 until 21 October 1943)
  - 70th (Royal Welch Fusiliers) Anti-Tank Regiment, Royal Artillery
- 38th Divisional engineers, Royal Engineers
  - 283rd Field Company (until 2 February 1944)
  - 284th Field Company (until 6 October 1943)
  - 561st Field Company (until 23 November 1941)
  - 616th Field Company (until 14 August 1944)
  - 247th Field Park Company (until 12 December 1941)
  - Divisional Field Stores Section (from 12 December 1941 until 14 August 1944)
- 38th Divisional Signals, Royal Corps of Signals
- 38th Independent Company, Reconnaissance Corps (2 January until 5 June 1942) (Note: In June 1942, the Reconnaissance Corps universally adopted cavalry nomenclature. As a result, all companies were redesignated as squadrons.)
- 38th Independent Squadron, Reconnaissance Corps (6 June 1942 until 18 October 1943)
- 161st Reconnaissance Regiment, Reconnaissance Corps (24 October until 12 November 1943)
- 38th Reconnaissance Regiment, Reconnaissance Corps (13 November until 31 December 1943)
- 38th Reconnaissance Regiment, Royal Armoured Corps (1 January until 14 August 1944)
- 5th Battalion, Cheshire Regiment (Machine gun battalion)

38th Infantry (Reserve) Division (1944–1945)

113th Infantry Brigade (formerly the 45th Infantry Brigade)

Main article: 113th Infantry Brigade
- 4th Battalion, East Lancashire Regiment
- 5th Battalion, Royal Inniskilling Fusiliers
- 5th Battalion, Border Regiment

114th Infantry Brigade (formerly the 211th Infantry Brigade)

Main article: 114th Infantry Brigade
- 5th Battalion, King's Shropshire Light Infantry
- 8th Battalion, Worcestershire Regiment
- 8th Battalion, Royal Warwickshire Regiment
- 9th Battalion, Royal Welch Fusiliers

Divisional Troops

- 195th Field Regiment, Royal Artillery
- 70th (Royal Welch Fusiliers) Anti-Tank Regiment, Royal Artillery
- 502nd (London) Field Company, Royal Engineers
- Divisional Field Stores Platoon, Royal Engineers
- 38th Infantry (Reserve) Divisional Signals, Royal Corps of Signals
- 80th Reconnaissance Regiment, Royal Armoured Corps (until 1 October 1944)
- 5th Battalion, Cheshire Regiment (Machine gun battalion)

== See also ==
- British Army Order of Battle (September 1939)
- Independent Company
- David Jones – poet and author of In Parenthesis based on his war-time experiences.
- Mametz Wood Memorial
- Johnny Williams – captain of the Welsh rugby union team who was killed during the fighting at Mametz Wood.
- Hedd Wyn – poet who was killed during the Battle of Passchendaele.

== Notes ==
Footnotes

Citations
