= James Llewellyn Davies =

Welsh Victoria Cross recipient (1886-1917)

- Born: 16 March 1886; Ebbw Vale, Gwent Wales
- Died: 31 July 1917 (aged 31); Polygon Wood, Pilckem Ridge, Passchendaele salient, Belgium
- Burial place: Canada Farm Cemetery, Elverdinghe
- Military career
- Allegiance: United Kingdom
- Branch: British Army
- Rank: Corporal
- Units: Royal Welsh Fusiliers
- Conflicts: First World War: Battle of Passchendaele; Battle of Pilckem Ridge †
- Awards: Victoria Cross

James Llewellyn Davies VC (16 March 1886 – 31 July 1917) was a Welsh recipient of the Victoria Cross, the highest and most prestigious award for gallantry in the face of the enemy that can be awarded to British and Commonwealth forces.

Davies was born in March 1886 in the Ogmore Vale, Glamorgan to John and Martha Davies. He married Elizabeth Ann Richards, who was originally from Nantymoel. As a corporal in the 13th Battalion, Royal Welsh Fusiliers (part of the 38th (Welsh) Division), he performed a deed on 31 July 1917 at Polygon Wood, Pilckem Ridge, Belgium which won him the Victoria Cross. However, he died of wounds received during the attack.

For most conspicuous bravery during an attack on the enemy's line, this non-commissioned officer pushed through our own barrage and single-handed attacked a machine gun emplacement, after several men had been killed in attempting to take it. He bayoneted one of the machine gun crew and brought in another man, together with the captured gun. Cpl. Davies, although wounded, then led a bombing party to the assault of a defended house, and killed a sniper who was harassing his platoon. This gallant non-commissioned officer has since died of wounds received during the attack.

On 20 October 1917, the King presented Corporal Davies' Victoria Cross to his widow and his eldest son. His VC is now on display at the Royal Welch Fusiliers Museum, Caernarfon Castle, Caernarfon, Wales.

He was buried in Canada Farm Cemetery (Plot II, B.18), Ypres, Belgium.
