= Geoffrey Raikes =

British Army general (1884–1975)

Major-General Sir Geoffrey Raikes CB DSO** DL
- Portrait by Walter Bird, 1960
- Born: 7 April 1884; Chislehurst, London, England
- Died: 27 March 1975 (aged 90)
- Military career
- Allegiance: United Kingdom
- Branch: British Army
- Service years: 1903–1938; 1939–1941
- Rank: Major-General
- Service number: 11292
- Unit: South Wales Borderers
- Commands: East Lancashire Area (1940–41); Aldershot Command (1940); 38th (Welsh) Infantry Division (1939–40); 9th Infantry Brigade (1935–37); 1st Battalion, South Wales Borderers (1931–34); 2nd Battalion, South Wales Borderers (1918)
- Conflicts: First World War; Second World War
- Awards: Knight Bachelor; Companion of the Order of the Bath; Distinguished Service Order & Two Bars; Mentioned in Despatches; Croix de Guerre (France)

Major-General Sir Geoffrey Taunton Raikes, CB, DSO & Two Bars, DL (7 April 1884 – 27 March 1975) was a British Army general who achieved high office in the 1930s.

== Military career ==
Educated at Radley College and the Royal Military College, Sandhurst, Raikes was commissioned into the South Wales Borderers in 1903. He was seconded to the Egyptian Army from 1913 to 1915.

He served in the First World War and by April 1918 found himself as commanding officer of the 2nd Battalion, South Wales Borderers at Armentières, where the battalion suffered heavy losses. He was awarded the Distinguished Service Order (DSO) and two bars for his service during the war. The citation for his second bar reads:

For conspicuous gallantry and devotion to duty when in command of the remnants of two brigades, formed as one battalion. Though both flanks had gone he held on, encouraging his men, and repelling frequent enemy attacks. When the situation was critical he inspired his men by his brilliant example, and it was due to his absolute disregard of danger, capacity for command, and powers of organisation that the line held to the last.

After the war, Raikes became an instructor at the Senior Officers School in 1922 before attending the Staff College, Camberley from 1924 to 1925 and moving on to be Chief Instructor of Military History and Tactics at the Royal Military College, Sandhurst. He was appointed commanding officer of the 1st Battalion, South Wales Borderers in 1931 and then reverted to being an instructor at the Senior Officers School. Promoted in June 1934 to colonel, with seniority dated back to June 1923, he was made commander of the 9th Infantry Brigade in 1935 and then retired in 1938.

During the Second World War, Raikes was recalled to be general officer commanding (GOC) of the 38th (Welsh) Infantry Division of the Territorial Army (TA).

Raikes was very keen on scouting. He was also Lord Lieutenant of Brecknockshire from 1948 to 1959.

== Bibliography ==
- Smart, Nick (2005). Biographical Dictionary of British Generals of the Second World War. Barnsley, South Yorkshire: Pen and Sword Books. ISBN 1844150496.

Military offices
New post	GOC 38th (Welsh) Infantry Division; 1939–1940	Succeeded by Aubrey Williams
Preceded by Michael Barker	GOC-in-C Aldershot Command; 1940	Succeeded by Dudley Johnson
Honorary titles
Preceded by The Lord Glanusk	Lord Lieutenant of Brecknockshire; 1948–1959	Succeeded by Sir William Parker, Bt
