= Llewellyn Alston =

British Army officer

- Born: 21 December 1890
- Died: 18 March 1969 (aged 78)
- Military career
- Allegiance: United Kingdom
- Branch: British Army
- Service years: 1912–1946
- Rank: Brigadier
- Service number: 1739
- Unit: Royal Welch Fusiliers
- Commands: 1st Battalion, Royal Welch Fusiliers; 113th Infantry Brigade
- Conflicts: First World War; Second World War
- Awards: Commander of the Order of the British Empire; Companion of the Distinguished Service Order; Military Cross; Legion of Merit

Brigadier Llewellyn Arthur Augustus Alston CBE DSO MC (21 December 1890 – 18 March 1969) was a British Army officer who saw active service in both of the world wars.

== Military career ==
Alston was commissioned into the Royal Welch Fusiliers on 4 December 1912. He served with the regiment in the First World War, and was promoted to captain in October 1915. He was awarded the Military Cross in 1918 and made a Companion of the Distinguished Service Order in 1919.

On 17 July 1929 Alston was promoted to the rank of major and in July 1939 attained the rank of colonel. Between July 1939 and July 1941, during World War II, he was Commanding Officer, 113th Infantry Brigade, before serving as commander, East Central Area, Sheffield Sub-District, 211 Sub-Area until October 1943. Alston was then appointed as a garrison commander until September 1944. From September 1944 to May 1945 Alston worked for the British military delegation in the United States, for which he received the Legion of Merit on 30 December 1947. On 20 September 1945, he was made a Commander of the Order of the British Empire, and served as Colonel of the Royal Welch Fusiliers between 1947 and 1948.

Honorary titles
Preceded by Nigel Maitland Wilson	Colonel of the Royal Welch Fusiliers; 1947–1948	Succeeded by Eric Ommaney Skaife
