= 45th Brigade (United Kingdom) =

45th Brigade 45th Infantry Brigade
- Active: 1914–1918; 1939–1946
- Country: United Kingdom
- Branch: Kitchener's Army
- Type: Infantry
- Size: Brigade
- Part of: 15th (Scottish) Infantry Division
- Engagements: First World War

Insignia
- Identification symbol: Divisional Insignia Scottish Red Lion Rampant, inside a yellow circle

The 45th Infantry Brigade was an infantry brigade of the British Army that saw active service in both the First and the Second World Wars with 15th (Scottish) Infantry Division.

== First World War ==
The brigade was raised, as 45th Brigade, in 1914 as part of Kitchener's New Armies shortly after the outbreak of the First World War. With the 15th (Scottish) Division, the brigade saw active service on the Western Front in Belgium and France.

The brigade command the following units:

- 13th (Service) Battalion, Royal Scots (Lothian Regiment)
- 7th (Service) Battalion, Royal Scots Fusiliers (until May 1916)
- 6th/7th (Service) Battalion, Royal Scots Fusiliers (left February 1918)
- 6th (Service) Battalion, Queen's Own Cameron Highlanders
- 11th (Service) Battalion, Princess Louise's (Argyll and Sutherland Highlanders) (until June 1918)
- 45th Machine Gun Company, Machine Gun Corps (formed 12 February 1916, moved to 15th Battalion, Machine Gun Corps 17 March 1918)
- 45th Trench Mortar Battery (formed 17 June 1916)
- 1/8th Battalion, Princess Louise's (Argyll and Sutherland Highlanders) (from June 1918)

The 7th (Service) Battalion, Royal Scots Fusiliers was an original member of the brigade. It merged with the 6th (Service) Battalion in May 1916 to form the 6th/7th Battalion.

== Second World War ==
The brigade was reformed just before the Second World War, as the 45th Infantry Brigade. The brigade was a 2nd Line Territorial Army formation and was part of the 15th (Scottish) Infantry Division, which was the duplicate of the 52nd (Lowland) Infantry Division and served in the Second World War. The brigade was formed as a duplicate of the 156th Infantry Brigade. It remained in the United Kingdom throughout the war and, in early January 1943, left the 15th Division and was replaced by 6th Guards Tank Brigade. The Brigade was then assigned to the 80th Infantry (Reserve) Division for training purposes. Once the 80th was disbanded, the brigade was assigned to the 38th Infantry (Reserve) Division whose control it remained under for the duration of the war.

During the war, the brigade contained the following units:

- 6th Battalion, Royal Scots Fusiliers (until 12 December 1939, rejoined 3 July 1940, left 27 December 1942)
- 9th Battalion, Cameronians (Scottish Rifles) (until 27 December 1942)
- 10th Battalion, Cameronians (Scottish Rifles) (until 22 July 1940)
- 45th Infantry Brigade Anti-Tank Company (formed 1 September, disbanded 14 December 1940)
- 10th Battalion, Black Watch (Royal Highland Regiment) (from 27 December 1942 until 21 July 1944)
- 11th Battalion, Argyll and Sutherland Highlanders (from 28 December 1942 until 20 July 1944)
- 4th Battalion, East Lancashire Regiment (from 23 July 1944)
- 5th Battalion, Royal Inniskilling Fusiliers (from 23 July 1944)
- 5th Battalion, Border Regiment (from 23 July 1944)
