= Donald Butterworth =

British Army general

Major-General Donald Butterworth DSO
- Born: 3 February 1895; Basford, Nottingham Unitary Authority, Nottinghamshire, England
- Died: 2 March 1983 (aged 88); Sevenoaks, Sevenoaks District, Kent, England
- Military career
- Allegiance: United Kingdom
- Branch: British Army
- Service years: 1915–1948
- Rank: Major-General
- Service number: 5776
- Unit: North Staffordshire Regiment
- Commands: 2nd Battalion, North Staffordshire Regiment; 218th Independent Infantry Brigade (Home); 113th Infantry Brigade; 38th (Welsh) Infantry Division; 78th Infantry Division
- Conflicts: First World War; Second World War
- Awards: Distinguished Service Order

Major-General Donald Clunes Butterworth DSO (3 February 1895 – 2 March 1983) was a senior British Army officer.

== Military career ==
Butterworth was commissioned into the North Staffordshire Regiment on 23 February 1915 during the First World War.

As commanding officer of the 2nd Battalion the North Staffordshire Regiment, Butterworth was sent to France shortly after the outbreak of war in September 1939 as part of the British Expeditionary Force and was involved in the battles of France and Belgium before eventually being evacuated from Dunkirk on 1 June 1940. He was appointed a companion of the Distinguished Service Order in recognition of his role in this action. He went on to become commander of the 218th Brigade in the UK in October 1940, commander of the 113th Brigade in the UK in July 1941 and General Officer Commanding 38th (Welsh) Division also in the UK in April 1942.

After that he was deployed to Italy to become General Officer Commanding 78th Infantry Division in August 1944 and saw action fighting around the Gothic Line before handing over command in October 1944 and retiring in June 1948.

== Bibliography ==
- Smart, Nick (2005). Biographical Dictionary of British Generals of the Second World War. Barnesley: Pen & Sword. ISBN 1844150496.
- Cook, Hugh (1970). The North Staffordshire Regiment (The Prince of Wales's). Famous Regiments. London: Leo Cooper. ISBN 0-85052-056-8.

Military offices
Preceded by Arthur Dowler	GOC 38th (Welsh) Infantry Division; 1942–1944	Succeeded by Lionel Cox
Preceded by Charles Keightley	GOC 78th Infantry Division; 1944	Succeeded by Keith Arbuthnott
