= 113th Brigade (United Kingdom) =

British Army unit

The 113th Brigade was an infantry brigade formation of the British Army active in both the First and the Second World Wars.

== First World War ==
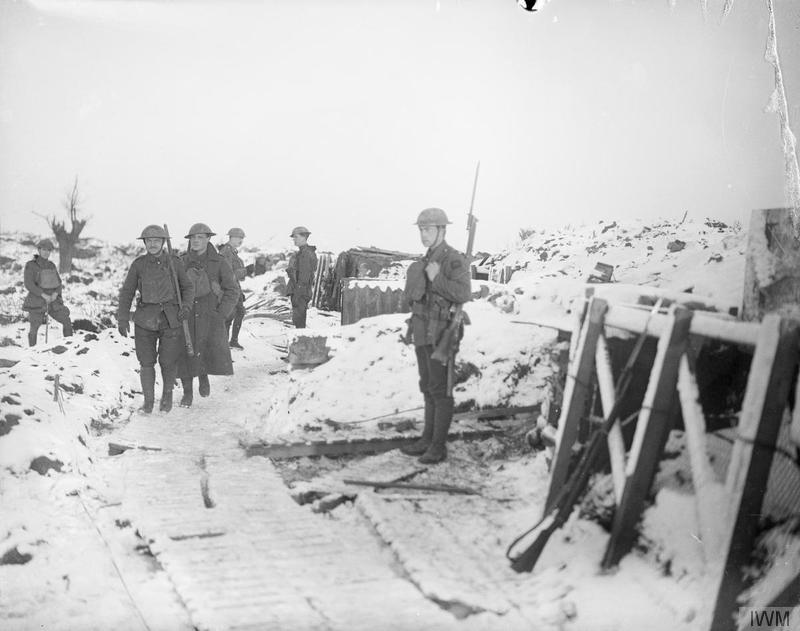
Men of the 15th (Service) Battalion (1st London Welsh), Royal Welsh Fusiliers in the snow-covered front line trenches at Fleurbaix, 28 December 1917.

The 113th Brigade was originally raised in the First World War from men volunteering for Lord Kitchener's New Armies, and was assigned to the 38th (Welsh) Division. The brigade, composed entirely of four battalions of the Royal Welsh Fusiliers, served in the trenches of the Western Front throughout the war.

=== Order of battle ===
The 113th Brigade was constituted as follows during the war:

- 13th (Service) Battalion, Royal Welsh Fusiliers (1st North Wales) (from November 1914)
- 14th (Service) Battalion, Royal Welsh Fusiliers (from November 1914)
- 15th (Service) Battalion, Royal Welsh Fusiliers (1st London Welsh) (from November 1914, disbanded February 1918)
- 16th (Service) Battalion, Royal Welsh Fusiliers (from November 1914)
- 17th (Service) Battalion, Royal Welsh Fusiliers (2nd North Wales) (from February 1915, left July 1915)
- 113th Machine Gun Company, Machine Gun Corps (from 19 May 1916, moved to 38th Battalion, Machine Gun Corps March 1918)
- 113th Trench Mortar Battery (from 26 December 1915)

== Second World War ==
The brigade and division were both disbanded after the war, but were reformed in the Territorial Army (TA), the British Army's part-time reserve force, in the latter half of 1939 as war with Nazi Germany seemed increasingly likely. As a consequence of this, the Territorial Army was ordered to be doubled in size, with each unit forming a 2nd Line duplicate. The 38th (Welsh) Infantry Division was reconstituted as was the brigade, now the 113th Infantry Brigade. The 113th Brigade, under the command of Brigadier Llewellyn Alston, was formed as a duplicate of the 160th Infantry Brigade and initially consisted of two TA battalions, the 15th and 2/5th, of the Welch Regiment and one, the 4th, of the Monmouthshire Regiment. However, the brigade never saw active service outside the United Kingdom during the Second World War and was reduced to a Lower Establishment and eventually became a training brigade.

=== Order of battle ===
The 113th Infantry Brigade was constituted as follows during the war:

- 15th Battalion, Welch Regiment (left 22 July 1944)
- 2/5th Battalion, Welch Regiment (left 29 August 1944)
- 4th Battalion, Monmouthshire Regiment (redesignated 1st Battalion, South Wales Borderers 12 December 1942)
- 113th Infantry Brigade Anti-Tank Company (formed 1 September 1940, disbanded 6 January 1942)
- 1st Battalion, South Wales Borderers (from 12 December 1942, left 30 November 1943, rejoined 21 January 1944, left 29 August 1944)

From 26 September 1944:

- 4th Battalion, East Lancashire Regiment
- 5th Battalion, Royal Inniskilling Fusiliers
- 5th Battalion, Border Regiment

=== Commanders ===
The following officers commanded the 113th Infantry Brigade during the war:

- Brigadier L.A.A. Alston (until 28 July 1941)
- Brigadier D.C. Butterworth (from 28 July 1941 until 30 April 1942)
- Brigadier N.A. McD. Walker (from 30 April 1942 until 22 June 1942)
- Brigadier H.V. Combe (from 22 June 1942)

From 26 September 1944:

- Brigadier B.B. Rackham (until 30 August 1945)
- Brigadier G.P. Harding (from 30 August 1945)

== Sources ==
- Joslen, H. F. (2003) [1960]. Orders of Battle: Second World War, 1939–1945. Uckfield, East Sussex: Naval and Military Press. ISBN 978-1-84342-474-1.
