= 99th (London Welsh) Heavy Anti-Aircraft Regiment, Royal Artillery =

99th (London Welsh) HAA Regiment, RA 499 (London Welsh) HAA Regiment, RA 499 (Kensington) HAA Regiment, RA
- Cap Badge of the Royal Artillery (pre-1953)
- Active: 1 April 1939–10 March 1955
- Country: United Kingdom
- Branch: Territorial Army
- Role: Air defence
- Size: Regiment
- Part of: Anti-Aircraft Command; 21st Army Group
- Garrison/HQ: Kensington
- Engagements: Battle of Britain; The Blitz; Operation Overlord; North West Europe

Commanders
- Colonel of the Regiment: General Sir Henry ap Rhys Pryce

The 99th (London Welsh) Heavy Anti-Aircraft Regiment, Royal Artillery was an air defence unit of Britain's Territorial Army (TA) during World War II. It defended London during the early part of the war, and later served in the campaign in North West Europe.

== Origin ==
The 99th Anti-Aircraft (AA) Regiment, Royal Artillery, was formed on 1 April 1939 as part of the expansion of the TA in the months leading up to the outbreak of war. It was raised from Welshmen living in London and was affiliated to the Welsh Guards. It was based at Inverna Gardens, Kensington, the drill hall of the Kensington Regiment (Princess Louise's) of the TA, and initially consisted of Regimental Headquarters (RHQ) with 302 and 303 AA Batteries.

== World War II ==
=== Mobilisation ===
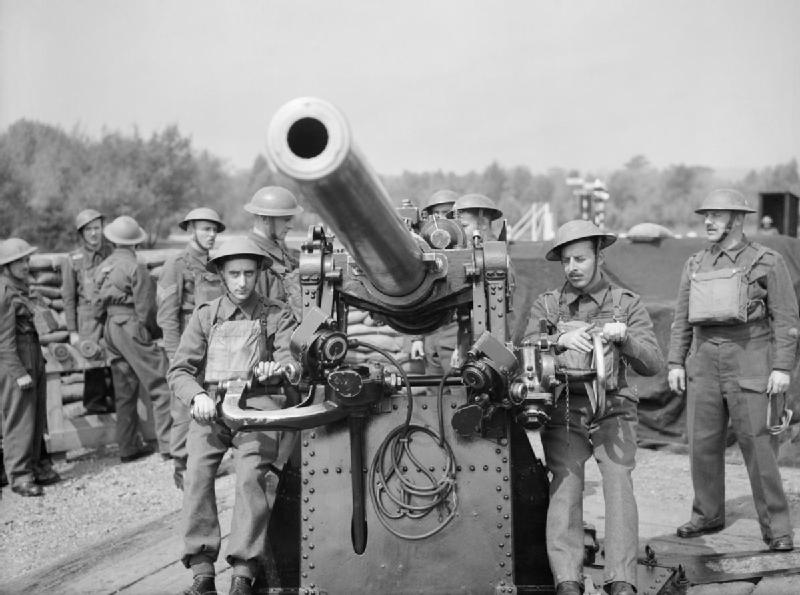

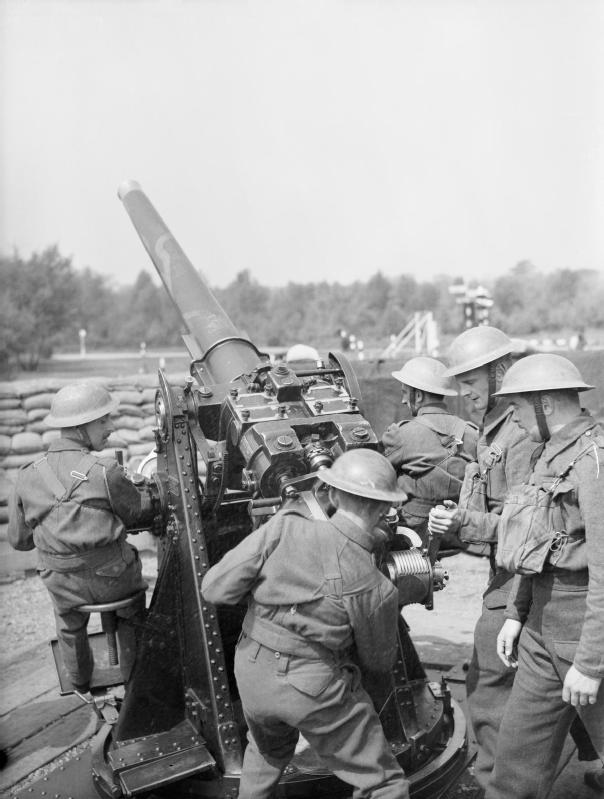

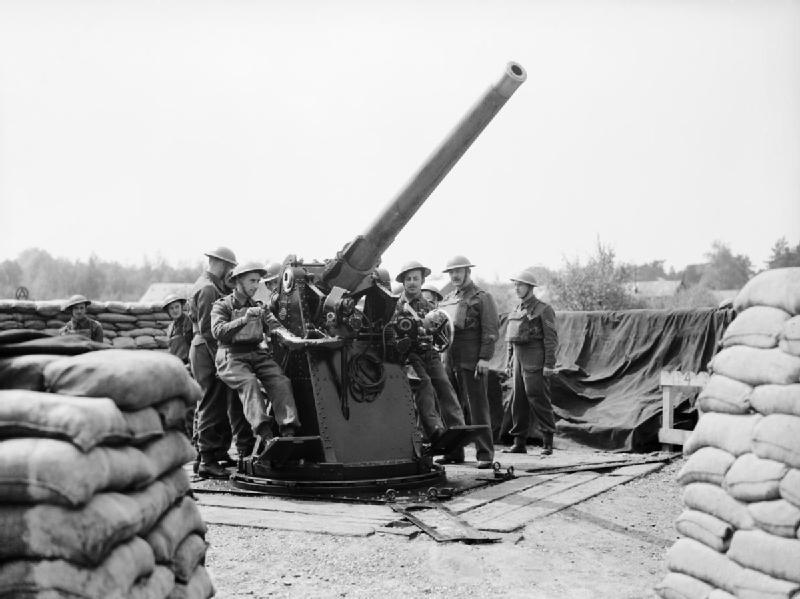

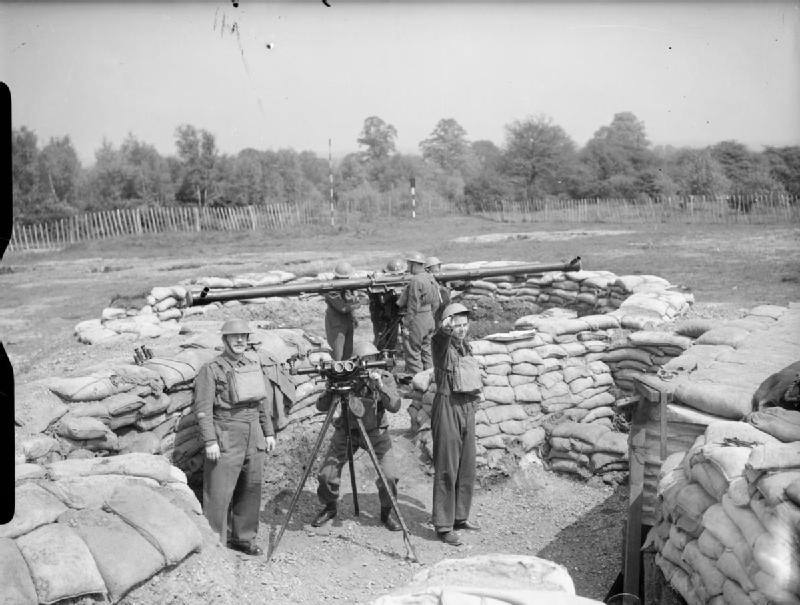
303 AA Bty manning 3-inch guns and range-finders at Hayes Common, May 1940

In June 1939, as the international situation deteriorated, a partial mobilisation of Anti-Aircraft Command was begun in a process known as 'couverture', whereby each TA unit did a month's tour of duty in rotation to man selected AA positions. 99th (LW) AA Regiment was embodied under the command of Lieutenant-Colonel J.M. Davies, MC, at Iverna Gardens on 19 August and went to the AA Practice Camp at Aberporth in Wales. On 24 August, ahead of the declaration of war, AA Command was fully mobilised at its war stations. The regiment returned by train and established RHQ at 31 Mitcham Lane, Streatham, with 302 AA Bty taking over gunsite ZS17 at Mitcham, and 303 AA Bty at ZS15 (Norbury) and ZS13 (Shirley). The regiment formed part of 48 AA Brigade in 1 AA Division tasked with defending London.

=== Phoney War ===
During the Phoney War period, there were numerous changes of battery locations around south and south-east London, with RHQ moving to the Wickham Court Hotel, West Wickham, in September. There was a shortage of heavy AA (HAA) guns, and 302 AA Bty spent periods manning AA Light machine guns (AALMGs) at Tolworth and Kingston Vale (October 1939) and Cricklewood (April 1940) before returning to man HAA gunsites. One of the HAA sites taken over was at Hayes Common, equipped with 3-inch guns. In May 1940, an official photographer pictured 303 AA Battery manning guns at this site.

On 15 February 1940, the regiment sent a cadre of officers and non-commissioned officers (NCOs) to 218 AA Training Rgt at Oswestry, where it became the basis of 318 AA By, formed on 22 February and regimented on 1 April as the third battery of 99th (LW) AA Rgt. The new battery first went to Towyn AA practice camp on 15 April and then to 54th (City of London) AA Rgt's area for training on 4.5-inch guns at site ZS4 (Bostall Heath). On 15 May, 318 AA Bty took over sites ZS14 (Dulwich) and ZS16 (Clapham) from 54th AA Rgt and established Battery HQ at College Road, Dulwich. In April, Lt-Col R.B. Rowett, MC, a Regular Army officer, took over as Commanding Officer (CO) of the regiment. On 1 June 1940, the AA Regiments were redesignated Heavy AA (HAA) to distinguish them from the new Light AA (LAA) regiments being formed.

=== Battle of Britain ===
On 5 June 1940, 99th (LW) HAA Rgt moved to Felixstowe on the East Coast and joined 37 AA Bde in 6 AA Division. 302 HAA Battery was stationed at Martlesham (H9), Waldringfield Heath (H10) and Ipswich (H12), and 303 HAA Bty at Felixstowe (H2); Lt-Col Rowett took over as AA Defence Commander (AADC) for the Harwich Gun Defence Area (GDA) covering Harwich, Ipswich, Felixstowe, Parkeston and Dovercourt, with its Gun Operations Room (GOR) at Felixstowe. On the night of 18/19 June, the regiment fired its first shots against hostile aircraft, when single bombers over the GDA were illuminated by searchlights (S/Ls). On 26 June the Harwich defences came under the command of 29 (East Anglian) AA Bde to allow 37 AA Bde to concentrate of the 'Thames North' defences covering London. At the end of the month, 318 HAA Bty arrived to join the Harwich defences (H1 and H3). By 11 July, the Harwich GDA had 17 HAA guns available.

In July 1940, there were almost daily attacks on shipping off the East Coast. In August, while the Battle of Britain was progressing by day over Kent and Essex, Luftwaffe seaplanes regularly dropped parachute mines in the harbours and estuaries by night, which 29 AA Bde's guns and S/Ls attempted to counter. The HAA sites' GL Mk I gunlaying radar proved useful in spotting these raiders. On 15 August, Erprobungsgruppe 210 slipped through to attack RAF Martlesham Heath and got away without loss, despite being engaged by the Harwich AA guns while withdrawing. The number of HAA guns at Harwich dwindled from 15 on 21 August to 8 on 11 September as 6 AA Division redeployed them to guard the RAF's vital fighter airfields.

=== Blitz ===
As the Luftwaffe shifted from attacking airfields to raiding London in September (the beginning of the London Blitz), 303 HAA Bty was sent to reinforce the city's defences, first taking over two gunsites in East London under the command of 8th (Belfast) HAA Rgt, where it fired large numbers of rounds, mostly at night. The rest of the regiment sent reinforcements to this hard-pressed battery. It also sent another cadre to 211th AA Training Rgt at Oswestry to form 380 HAA Bty (this later joined 109th HAA Rgt).

On 27 October, another daylight raid was made on Martlesham by about 40 Messerschmitt Bf 109 fighter-bombers, which were engaged by the HAA guns on their way in and out. The regiment claimed that the raiders were disrupted by the fire, and the bomb damage was slight. Later that day, three Dornier Do 17s came in low to machine-gun site H12. Gunner Stanley Martin, manning the site's close defence AALMG, held his fire until one was close, and then fired a full drum into it, causing it to crash in the River Stour. Gunner Martin was later awarded the Military Medal. This was the first of a number of low-level attacks on coastal AA sites during the winter. On 29 October, 303 Bty (now at Mitcham) suffered casualties when site ZS17 was bombed. During November, the battery moved around London, relieving gunners on different sites as the Luftwaffe continued to pound the city by night. Between 24/25 October and 2 January, the Italian Corpo Aereo Italiano made 10 raids (totalling 87 bomber sorties) against Harwich from its bases in occupied Belgium. In the only daylight raid, on 11 November, 3 of the 10 attacking bombers and 3 of the 40 escorting righters were shot down by the AA and fighter defences.

303 HAA Battery rejoined the regiment during December, being sent to man 3-inch gunsites at RAF North Weald (under 29 AA Bde) and RAF Wattisham (under 6 AA Bde). In January 1941, the regiment established a Regimental Training Depot at site H4 (Shotley) and took in its first intake of new recruits. The regiment was credited with a number of 'kills' during February.

=== Orkney ===
In early May 1941, the batteries were relieved and RHQ closed down, and the regiment entrained for Scotland and then ferried to Orkney to serve in 59 AA Bde of the Orkney and Shetland Defence Force (OSDEF) protecting the great Royal Navy anchorage at Scapa Flow. RHQ was established at St Margaret's Hope, South Ronaldshay, with 302 HAA Bty at sites R1 and R2 on South Ronaldshay, 303 HAA Bty at R3 on South Ronaldshay and at B1 on Burray, 318 HAA Bty at F1 and F2 on Flotta. The gunsites practised firing a 'Fleet Barrage', but the only Luftwaffe aircraft generally seen were single reconnaissance flights that were fired at with occasional claims of damage inflicted.

The regiment sent another cadre to 211th HAA Training Regiment at Oswestry for a new 519 (Mixed) HAA Bty ('Mixed' units were those into which women from the Auxiliary Territorial Service were integrated). This was formed on 13 January 1942 and later joined 152nd (Mixed) HAA Rgt.

The regiment's tour of duty in Orkney came to an end in August 1942, when RHQ, 302 and 303 HAA Btys were relieved by 119th HAA Rgt and embarked on SS Amsterdam for Invergordon. It then went to take over four gunsites at St Botolphs near Milford Haven by 14 August, where it came under 67 AA Bde in 3 AA Group. 318 HAA Battery remained in OSDEF under the command of 119th HAA Rgt, while 99th (LW) Rgt was joined by 399 HAA Bty from 138th HAA Rgt. At the end of the month, Lt-Col P. Hodder-Williams, MBE, replaced Lt-Col Rowett as CO.

=== Mobile training ===
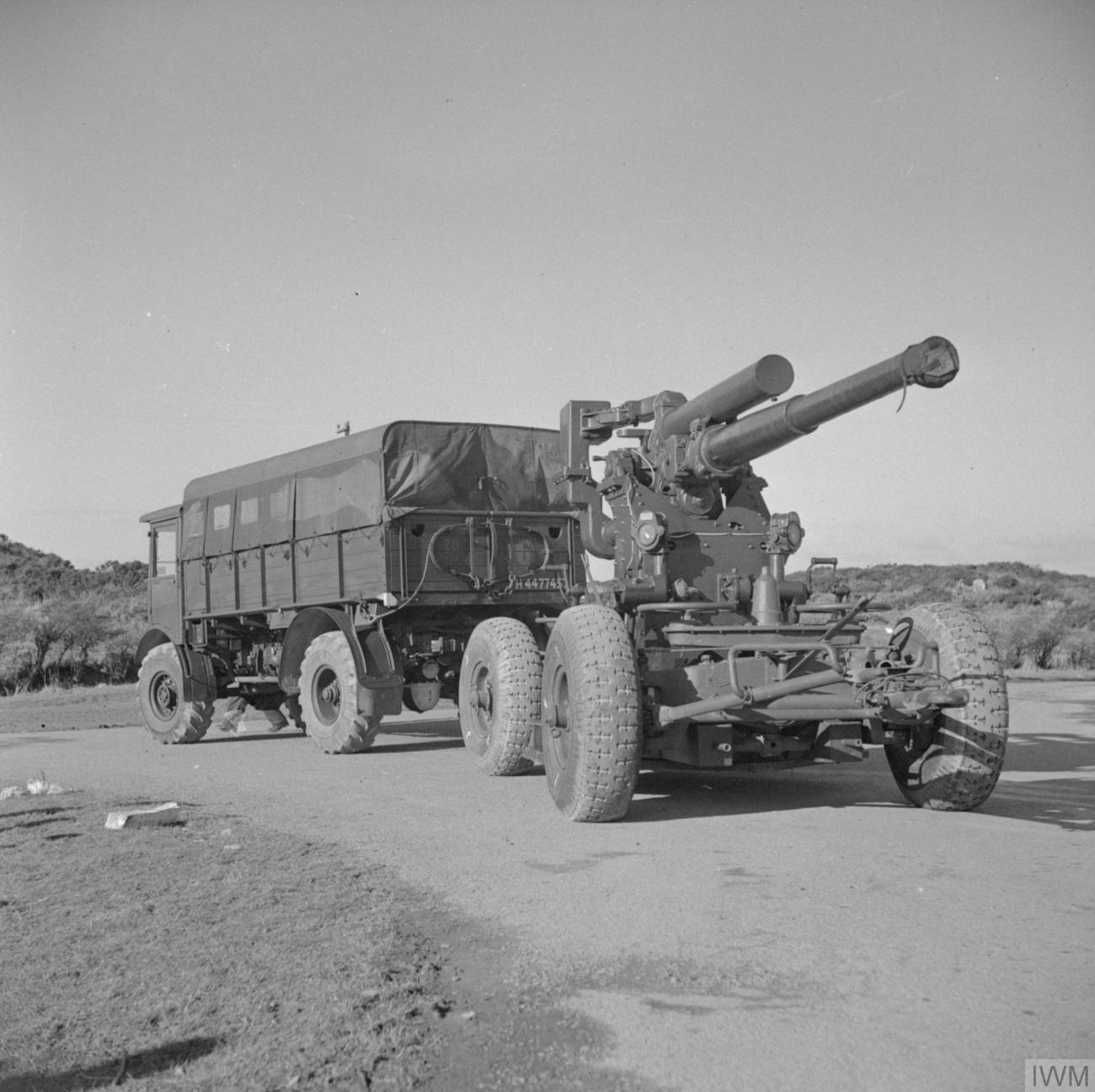
An AEC Matador artillery tractor towing a 3.7-inch HAA gun during training in 1944.

318 HAA Battery returned to the regiment in place of 399 HAA Bty in mid-September, though it was posted at Port Talbot under 45 AA Bde. RHQ and 302 HAA Bty moved to Margam Castle on 29 September, leaving 303 HAA Bty at Milford Haven under a Royal Marines brigade HQ. While at Milford Haven, the regiment had been joined by a Workshop Section of the Royal Electrical and Mechanical Engineers (REME), a precursor to becoming a mobile unit, and on 3 October it was informed that it was on the mobile roster. The regiment moved to Bentham House at Shurdington, near Cheltenham, to begin the first phase of mobilisation, while the batteries remained operational under AA Command (303 HAA Bty in the Swansea GDA and 318 HAA Bty in the Gloucester GDA). Additional drivers were posted to the regiment, and the Gun Tractor Vehicles (GTVs) collected mobile 3.7-inch guns for training, while parties were sent to a Battle Training School at Leighton Buzzard. On 24 December the whole regiment concentrated at Wotton Underwood for a month's battle training, followed by a month's mobile training with 11 AA Bde at Leigh-on-Sea. Afterwards, it went to Norton Court near Bristol, and then to Headingley, Leeds, where the order for full mobilisation was received on 13 March 1943 and it came under War Office control. By July, it was part of 21st Army Group training for the Allied invasion of mainland Europe (Operation Overlord), in which it was designated a semi-mobile unit.

It was usual for AA units to be lent back to AA Command for operational use when not engaged in training. From the end of April to 1 June, 302 and 318 HAA Btys deployed to positions defending Lincoln under 50 AA Bde, and 303 HAA Bty to York under 31 AA Bde. Then, after a month at the AA Practice Camp at Aberporth, the regiment deployed around Canterbury under 104 AA Bde covering large-scale exercises in Kent until the end of September, when it carried out sea firing at Ramsgate. There were long-distance moves to Yorkshire and to Redesdale Practice Camp (where the gunners trained in anti-tank and ground shooting) before the regiment returned to Ramsgate and then moved to Eastbourne by the end of the year.

After further training, at Larkhill on Salisbury Plain and at Tŷ Croes on Anglesey, the regiment moved to Southend-on-Sea in April 1944 to join 76 AA Bde, under which it was to operate in 'Overlord'.

=== Normandy ===
The regiment's command and reconnaissance groups embarked with their vehicles on Motor Transport (MT) ships 77 and 102 at Tilbury Docks on 5–6 June and landed at Arromanches-les-Bains in Normandy on 9 June (D + 3), followed the next day by all but six of the regiment's guns. 76 AA Brigade's role was to provide an Inner Artillery Zone (IAZ) to protect Gold Beach, Arromanches where the Mulberry harbour was being built, and the little harbour of Port-en-Bessin, where the Pipe-Line Under The Ocean (Pluto) oil facilities would be sited. Eight of the regiment's guns were deployed to Port-en-Bessin on 11 June, and B Troop fired the regiment's first rounds on ground targets in the village of Hottot-les-Bagues. The remainder of the regiment's guns arrived the same day, and the REME workshop landed on 14 June amid shellfire and high waves that 'drowned' most of their vehicles, which had to be recovered.

As the beachhead was expanded, RHQ moved to the village of Sommervieu on 21 June. Over the early days of the campaign, the regiment fired a large number of rounds, both in the AA role (claiming several 'kills' of Junkers Ju 88 night intruders) and in the ground role. The regiment was commended by XXX Corps for the accuracy of the airburst concentrations fired by B Trp in support of 49th (West Riding) Division. A number of officers were attached to RA medium regiments to familiarise them with fire control methods in case the regiment was used in that role. During July, the regiment submitted a number of claims of bombers and fighter-bombers shot down, as well as one V-1 flying bomb. The regiment's rear echelon arrived from Tilbury on 18 July aboard MT 41 (the Empire Canyon).

At the end of August, 21st Army Group broke out of the Normandy beachhead and began to pursue the beaten enemy up the coast. 76 AA Brigade followed this advance, leaving 99th (LW) HAA Rgt in Normandy. Together with the lorries of 1671 Artillery Platoon, Royal Army Service Corps (RASC), it was transferred on 26 August to 101 AA Bde defending the port of Cherbourg in the US Army sector. On 3 September, 5 Royal Marine AA Bde HQ and 111th HAA Rgt began arriving to take over these commitments and 99th (LW) HAA Rgt prepared to move out with 101 AA Bde behind 21st Army Group.

=== Belgium ===
101 AA Brigade HQ handed over responsibility for Cherbourg on 4 September and immediately set out for Brussels, which had been liberated the day before. However, 99th (LW) HAA Rgt had to wait until 111th HAA Rgt and its equipment had all arrived before moving out on 10 September. It bivouacked near Rouen until 14 September, awaiting the fall of Boulogne; the CO was appointed AADC-designate of Boulogne. However, the regiment was then ordered into Belgium, reaching Ostend on 18 September, where it took on a joint AA and coastal defence (CD) role under 75 AA Bde

99th (LW) HAA Regiment remained at Ostend, with 318 HAA Bty at Middelkerke, throughout October and November. Apart from occasional AA engagements, there was little action, but the regiment received the new Radar No 3 Mark V (the SCR-584 radar set) and No 10 Predictor (the all-electric Bell Labs AAA Computer), which had proved their value in AA Command's Operation Diver against V-1 flying bombs (codenamed 'Divers'). Brussels was now under heavy attack by V-1s and, on 1 December, the regiment was rejoined by 1671 Pln RASC and prepared to rejoin 101 AA Bde in the Diver or 'X' defences of that city. The regiment began the move to Louvain, near Brussels, on 5 December, and took over 'very poor' sites where 'the mud was indescribable'.

When the Germans began their offensive in the Ardennes in December 1944 (the Battle of the Bulge), and briefly threatened to break through to Antwerp, 80 AA Bde (which was operating the Diver early warning radar system) was warned to prepare to convert into an Army Group Royal Artillery (AGRA) at short notice. AGRAs were groups of (usually) medium and heavy artillery held at Corps level. If necessary, 99th (LW) HAA Rgt would come under that formation operating in the medium artillery and anti-tank (A/T) role supporting 11th Armoured Division and 3 AGRA. The brigade would also be responsible for the ground defence of the approaches to Tirlemont, taking anti-paratroop measures. The regiment established the necessary observation posts (OPs) and A/T positions, but they were not required. Despite concerted attacks on nearby airfields by Luftwaffe fighters on 1 January (Operation Bodenplatte), the ground situation was well under control and the AGRA and local defence plans were cancelled on that day.

=== Netherlands ===
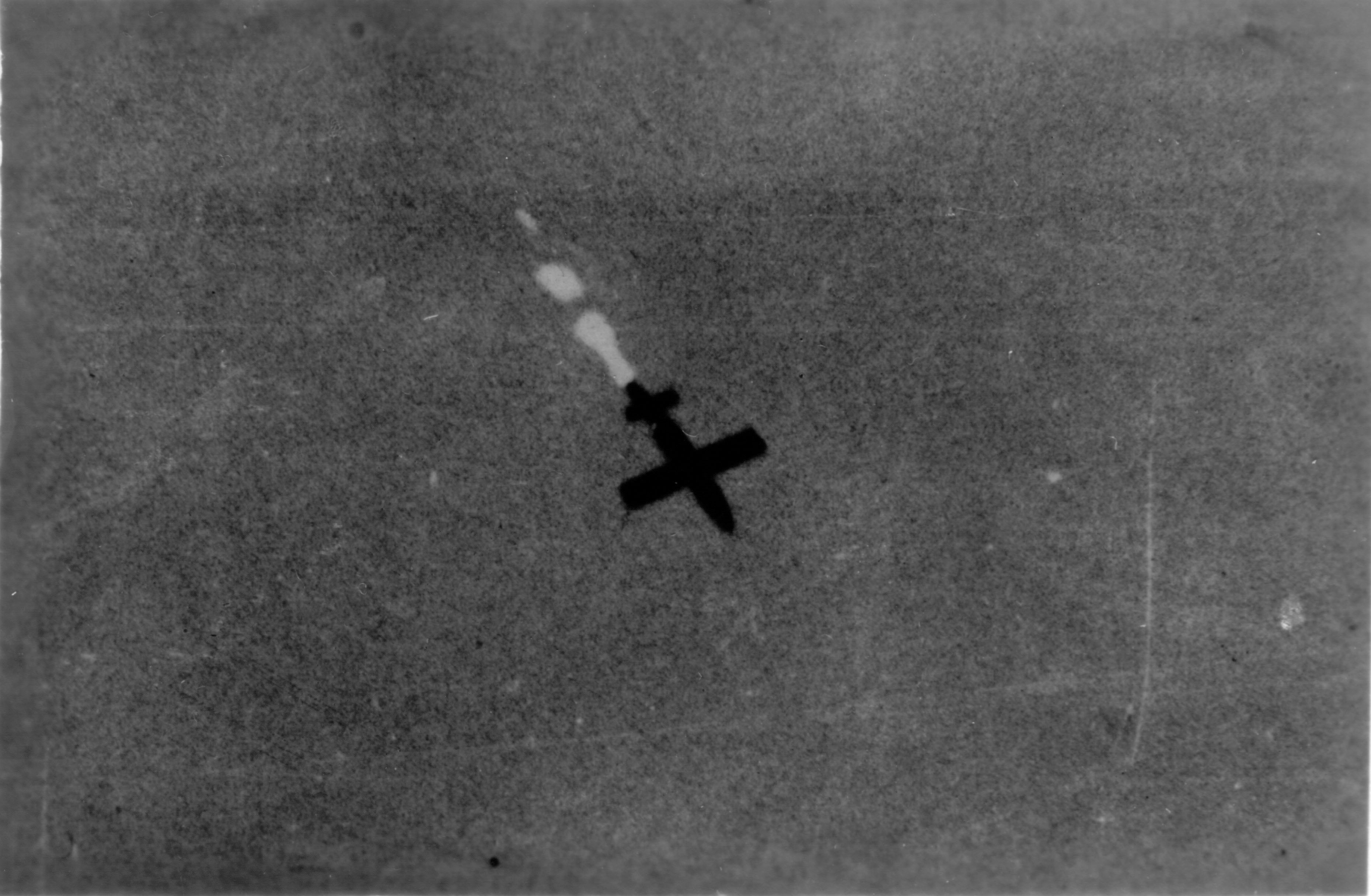
V-1 in flight over Antwerp

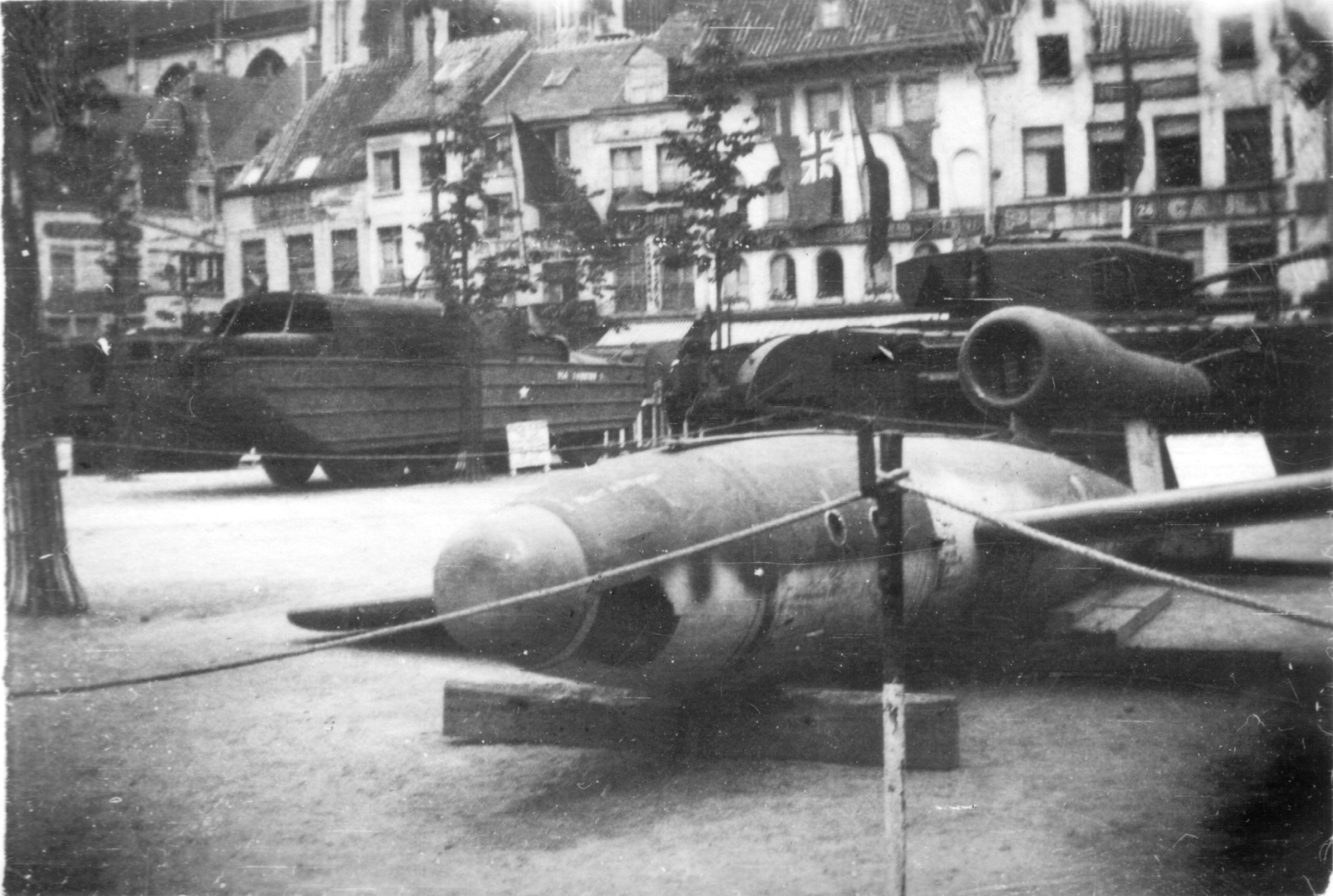
Captured V-1 displayed at Antwerp at the end of World War II.

The vital port of Antwerp was the main 'Diver' target, and the number of V-1s launched against Brussels declined sharply after December. In January the regiment was released from the 'X' defences and moved up to Helmond in the Netherlands. Despite bad weather and campsites, the regiment came into action on 9 January, with 303 HAA Bty firing in the ground role at Overloon. Over the following weeks, the battery was engaged as medium artillery firing percussion-fused and airburst high explosive (HE) rounds in support of II Canadian Corps and VIII British Corps, sometimes carrying out several shoots a day against targets of opportunity. The intensity of this work increased on 8 February with the opening of First Canadian Army's offensive in the Reichswald (Operation Veritable) when the battery's 8 guns frequently fired over 1000 rounds per day.

On 27 February, the regiment (less 303 HAA Bty still operating the ground role) moved to Roosendaal to join the Antwerp 'X' defences, with four 4-gun sites constantly in action against V-1s and occasional Messerschmitt Me 262 reconnaissance jets during early March. By April, the Diver offensive was virtually over, and on 17 April the regiment moved to South Beveland to join the defences of the Scheldt estuary under 76 AA Bde. F ('Fox') Troop of 318 HAA Bty was detached to North Beveland where it operated as 'Tom Group' firing on ground targets in support of 4th Commando Brigade. On 21 April, Tom Group was reinforced by a Troop of 352 HAA Bty, 112th HAA Rgt and a survey Troop, all under Major D.S. Harries, the second-in-command of 99th (LW) HAA Rgt. Although the South Scheldt defences were quiet, Tom Group was in daily action, suffering a few casualties from enemy Counter-battery fire. On one occasion, a gun was redeployed to engage a troublesome enemy OP in a tower; it fired 17 rounds, of which two hit the difficult target.

On 25 April, Tom Gp fired 600 shells into German positions without any retaliation, and two days later the battery commander flew over Schowen in an air observation post (AOP) aircraft and saw no sign of life: the Germans had retreated. The brigade was ordered to cease fire on 3 May 1945, when a local truce came into effect to allow supplies to be sent to civilians in enemy-occupied Holland (Operation Manna). This was followed on 4 May by the German surrender at Lüneburg Heath. On 7 May, Tom Gp covered Operation Paul, a Commando landing at Schowen to take the surrender of the garrison. The war in Europe ended the following day (VE Day).

On 14 May, the regiment was ordered to reorganise for garrison duties, and it handed in its guns and many of its vehicles, moving at the end of the month to Hamburg under 101 AA Bde where it took over responsibility for camps of Displaced Persons awaiting evacuation, and guarded Joachim von Ribbentrop, who had been arrested as a war criminal. The regiment was still with British Army of the Rhine when it was placed in suspended animation on 1 April 1946.

== Postwar ==
When the TA was reconstituted on 1 January 1947, the regiment was reformed as 499 (M) HAA Regiment (London Welsh), the 'M' now indicating a 'Mixed' regiment into which members of the Women's Royal Army Corps were integrated. It formed part of 64 AA Brigade (the wartime 38 Light AA Bde). (Note: The regiment's old number was taken by the war-formed 141st HAA Rgt, which was reformed in the Regular Army as 99 HAA Rgt in 1947. The new 99 HAA Rgt continued in a 'godfather' role with 499 (M) HAA Rgt, supervising training at practice camps, etc. However, 99 HAA Rgt was placed in suspended animation by 21 October 1948.)

However, by 1951, there were only three Welshmen serving in the regiment. The following year, the regiment was adopted by the Royal Borough of Kensington and changed its designation to 499th (M) Heavy Anti-Aircraft Regiment, RA (Kensington). AA Command was abolished on 10 March 1955 and 499th HAA Rgt was disbanded at the same time.

== Insignia ==
Welsh flag used as a shoulder flash 1947–51.

From formation until about 1942, the regiment wore a shoulder title bearing the words LONDON WELSH embroidered in yellow on dark blue, similar to the pattern worn by the Welsh Guards. Between 1947 and 1951, the 499th HAA Rgt wore a regimental flash consisting of the Welsh flag. After the change of title in 1951, this was replaced by a supplementary arm title with the word KENSINGTON in red on navy blue, worn underneath the Royal Artillery shoulder title.

== Honorary Colonel ==
General Sir Henry ap Rhys Pryce was Honorary Colonel of the regiment during World War II.

== Other London Welsh units ==
The London Welsh Rifles were formed in 1861 as part of the Rifle Volunteer Movement. At the beginning of the year, about 150 men were reported to be drilling at the Floral Hall in Covent Garden and at Sir Watkyn Williams Wynn's house. In May 1861, drills were being held at the Ward School in Aldersgate. By January 1862, the unit had been accepted as the 5th (London Welsh) City of London Rifle Volunteer Corps of two companies and it adopted a silver badge bearing the title 'London Welsh Rifle Corps' with a rampant dragon as centrepiece. The unit had disappeared by May 1862.

The 15th (Service) Battalion (1st London Welsh) and 18th (Reserve) Battalion (2nd London Welsh) of the Royal Welsh Fusiliers were formed at Gray's Inn as part of 'Kitchener's Army in 1914–15. The service battalion fought on the Western Front, seeing action on the Somme and at Ypres, until it was broken up to provide reinforcements for other units in February 1918.

== Notes ==
- Maj A.F. Becke,History of the Great War: Order of Battle of Divisions, Part 3b: New Army Divisions (30–41) and 63rd (R.N.) Division, London: HM Stationery Office, 1939/Uckfield: Naval & Military Press, 2007, ISBN 1-847347-41-X.
- Basil Collier, History of the Second World War, United Kingdom Military Series: The Defence of the United Kingdom, London: HM Stationery Office, 1957.
- Richard Collier, Eagle Day: The Battle of Britain, August 6–September 15, 1940, London: Hodder & Stoughton, 1966/Pan Books, 1968, ISBN 0-330-02105-2.
- Major L.F. Ellis, History of the Second World War, United Kingdom Military Series: Victory in the West, Vol II: The Defeat of Germany, London: HM Stationery Office, 1968/Uckfield: Naval & Military, 2004, ISBN 1-845740-59-9.
- Gen Sir Martin Farndale, History of the Royal Regiment of Artillery: The Years of Defeat: Europe and North Africa, 1939–1941, Woolwich: Royal Artillery Institution, 1988/London: Brasseys, 1996, ISBN 1-85753-080-2.
- J.B.M. Frederick, Lineage Book of British Land Forces 1660–1978, Vol II, Wakefield, Microform Academic, 1984, ISBN 1-85117-009-X.
- Brig E.A. James, British Regiments 1914–18, London: Samson Books, 1978, ISBN 0-906304-03-2/Uckfield: Naval & Military Press, 2001, ISBN 978-1-84342-197-9.
- Norman E.H. Litchfield, The Territorial Artillery 1908–1988 (Their Lineage, Uniforms and Badges), Nottingham: Sherwood Press, 1992, ISBN 0-9508205-2-0.
- Brig N.W. Routledge, History of the Royal Regiment of Artillery: Anti-Aircraft Artillery 1914–55, London: Royal Artillery Institution/Brassey's, 1994, ISBN 1-85753-099-3
- Ray Westlake, Tracing the Rifle Volunteers, Barnsley: Pen and Sword, 2010, ISBN 978-1-84884-211-3.

== Online sources ==
- British Army units from 1945 on
- Orders of Battle at Patriot Files
- Graham Watson, The Territorial Army 1947 Archived 9 December 2021 at the Wayback Machine
