= Holmbury =

Holmbury may be:

- Holmbury St Mary, village in Surrey, England
- Holmbury Hill, wooded geographical feature in Surrey, England
- SS Holmbury, ships of the Houlder Line
