= 15th (Service) Battalion, Royal Welsh Fusiliers (1st London Welsh) =

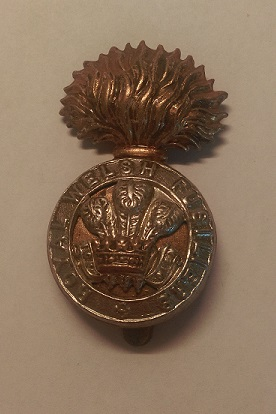
- Cap badge of the Royal Welch Fusiliers
- Active: 29 October 1914–27 February 1918
- Allegiance: United Kingdom
- Branch: New Army
- Type: Pals battalion
- Role: Infantry
- Size: One Battalion
- Part of: 38th (Welsh) Division
- Garrison/HQ: Gray's Inn
- Patron: Sir Vincent Evans
- Engagements: Mametz Wood; Third Battle of Ypres

The 1st London Welsh Battalion, later the 15th (Service) Battalion, Royal Welsh Fusiliers, ('15th RWF') was a 'Pals battalion' of 'Kitchener's Army' recruited during World War I from Welshmen living in London. It served in 38th (Welsh) Division and took part in the division's costly attack on Mametz Wood during the Battle of the Somme. The battalion continued to serve on the Western Front, including the Third Battle of Ypres, until February 1918 when it was broken up to provide reinforcements to other units.

== Recruitment & training ==
Alfred Leete's recruitment poster for Kitchener's Army.

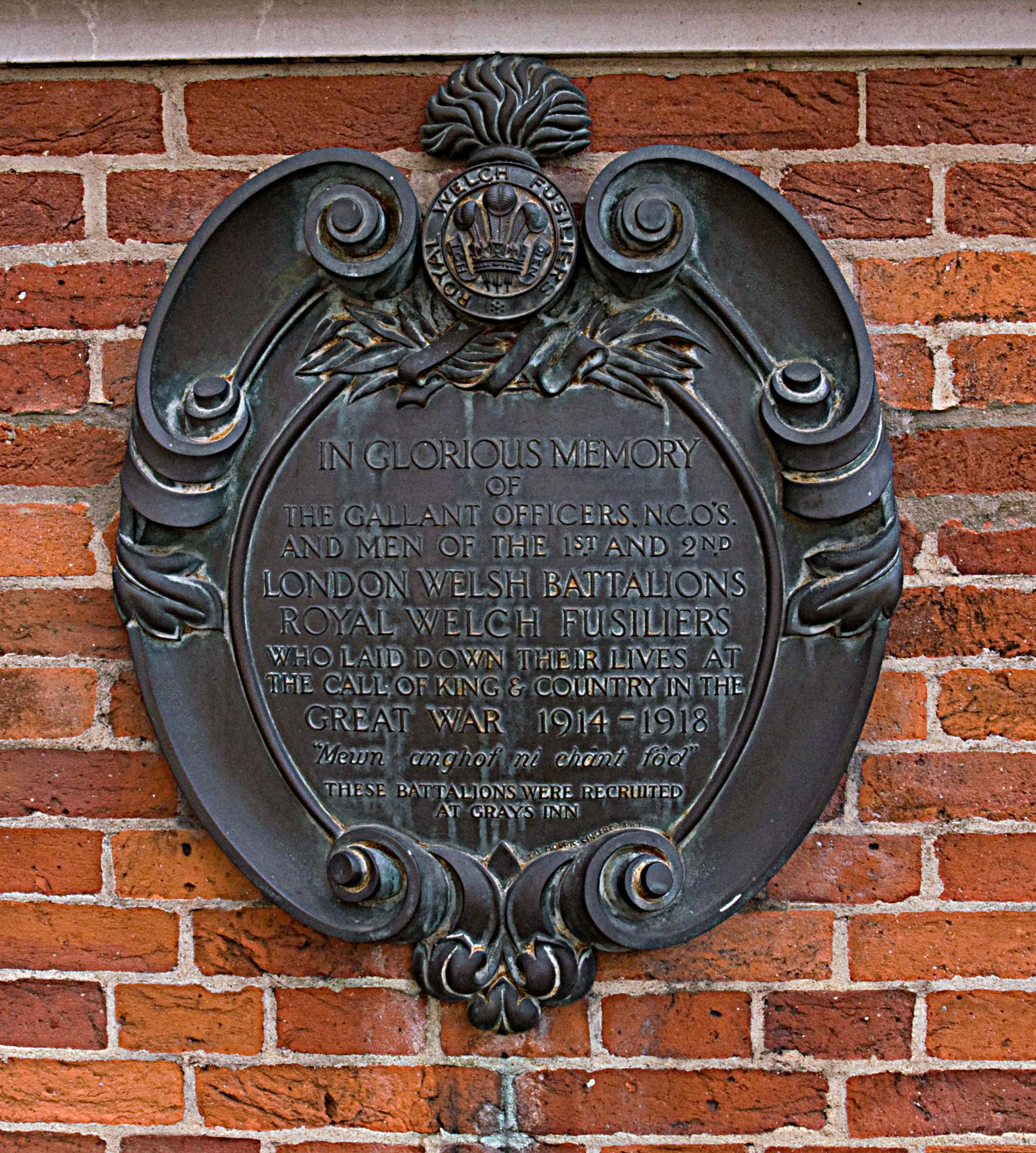
The London Welsh memorial at Gray's Inn.

On 6 August 1914, less than 48 hours after Britain's declaration of war, Parliament sanctioned an increase of 500,000 men for the Regular British Army, and the newly appointed Secretary of State for War, Earl Kitchener of Khartoum issued his famous call to arms: 'Your King and Country Need You', urging the first 100,000 volunteers to come forward. A flood of volunteers poured into the recruiting offices across the country to be formed into 'Service' battalions of the county regiments, and the 'first hundred thousand' were enlisted within days. This group of six divisions with supporting arms became known as Kitchener's First New Army, or 'K1'. K2, K3 and K4 followed shortly afterwards.

However, these were soon joined by groups of men from particular localities or backgrounds who wished to serve together. Starting in London and Liverpool, the phenomenon of 'Pals battalions' quickly spread across the country, as local recruiting committees offered complete units to the War Office (WO), which soon constituted the Fifth New Army (K5). One such unit was raised after a meeting of Welshmen living in London was held on 16 September under the presidency of Sir Vincent Evans. The resulting 'London Welsh Battalion' established its headquarters (HQ) at the Inns of Court Hotel in Holborn, and the Benchers of Gray's Inn lent their gardens and squares as drill grounds. Recruits poured in, but the battalion was not officially recognised until 29 October 1914, by which time many of the keenest recruits had drifted away to join other units. Nevertheless, the committee kept a large number together and continued to recruit, the men living at home while drilling at Gray's Inn. The battalion officially became the 15th (Service) Battalion of the Royal Welsh Fusiliers (Note: Although the regiment preferred the spelling 'Welch', this was not officially accepted until 1921.) (RWF). Many of the recruits were second- or third-generation Londoners who spoke with a Cockney rather that Welsh accent. Many of their families originally came from Carmarthenshire and worked in the dairy business. Later in the war drafts for the battalion came from the traditional North Wales recruiting area of the RWF.

A larger recruiting organisation was the 'Welsh National Executive Committee' (WNEC) formed after David Lloyd George addressed a meeting of representatives from all over Wales. The WNEC aimed to raise a complete Welsh Army Corps of two divisions. The WO accepted the proposal on 10 October and the London Welsh became part of this organisation. William Augustus Lane Fox-Pitt, a retired Major of the Grenadier Guards, was appointed commanding officer (CO) of 15th RWF on 28 November 1914 with the rank of lieutenant-colonel. Among the other early London Welsh officers were Lloyd George's two sons Richard and Gwilym, who transferred as Second lieutenants from the 6th (Caernarvonshire and Anglesey) Bn, RWF, and later served in the Royal Engineers (RE) and Royal Artillery (RA) respectively. Another of the original officers, Goronwy Owen, was also distantly related to Lloyd George. Llewelyn Wyn Griffith, who later wrote a memoir about his service with the battalion (Up to Mametz), transferred from the 7th (Merionethshire and Montgomeryshire) Bn, RWF.

On 5 December 1914 the 15th RWF travelled to Llandudno in North Wales to join 128th (1st Welsh) Brigade of 43rd Division (1st Division, Welsh Army Corps). These were renumbered in April 1915 as 113th Brigade and 38th (Welsh) Division respectively. The over-ambitious plan to raise a complete Welsh Army Corps had by that time been abandoned. The other three units in 113th Bde were the 13th (1st North Wales), 14th and 16th (Service) Battalions, RWF.

With units scattered across North Wales there was no opportunity for divisional training. However, in August 1915 38th (W) Division began to concentrate around Winchester where it trained for open warfare on the Hampshire downland, leaving trench warfare to be learned when the troops reached the theatre of war. It was not until November that enough rifles arrived for all the men to undertake their musketry course. 38th (W) Division was now warned for service with the British Expeditionary Force (BEF) on the Western Front. Lieutenant-Col Fox-Pitt was one of nine battalion COs in 38th (W) Division (all previously retired Regular or Militia officers – 'dug-outs') who were replaced by younger men before the division went overseas. He was succeeded by Lt-Col Richard Carmichael Bell of the Central India Horse on 13 November.

On 1 December 15 RWF marched from Winchester to Southampton and a party left for France that night aboard the City of Chester. The rest of the battalion boarded the Queen Alexandra at Southampton Docks next day and landed at Le Havre on the morning of 3 December. It then went by train to join the divisional concentration at Aire on 6 December and marched to its training area near Saint-Omer.

=== 18th (Reserve) Battalion (2nd London Welsh) ===
After the 1st London Welsh went to Llandudno, the committee continued recruiting at Gray's Inn, and in February 1915 was able to raise the 2nd London Welsh as the 18th (Service) Battalion, RWF. In June, under the command of Lt-Col Ivor Bowen, it went to Bangor, North Wales, to be attached to 38th (W) Division, but when the division moved to Winchester in August the 18th RWF was converted into a 'local reserve battalion' with the role of supplying reinforcement drafts to 15th RWF. It was sent to Kinmel Camp near Conwy to join 14th Reserve Brigade. On 1 September 1916 the local reserve battalions were transferred to the Training Reserve (TR) and 18th (R) Bn combined with 20th (R) Bn RWF at Kinmel to become 63rd Training Reserve Battalion, though the training staff retained their RWF badges. On 4 July 1917 this battalion was redesignated 226th (Infantry) Battalion, TR, and on 23 July it moved to Halesworth in Suffolk to join 203rd (2nd North Wales) Brigade in 68th (2nd Welsh) Division in the east coast defences. On 27 October 1917 the battalion was transferred to the Welsh Regiment as 51st (Graduated) Battalion, still in 203rd Bde. It moved into Great Yarmouth for the winter but by May 1918 it was at Herringfleet where it remained training recruits until the Armistice with Germany. On 8 February 1919 it was converted into a service battalion and the following month was sent to join 2nd Brigade of Western Division serving in the occupation forces in Germany with British Army of the Rhine. The brigade was broken up in July 1919 and the battalion was disbanded on 31 March 1920.

== Service ==
On 18 December 15th RWF paraded and was taken by motor buses to La Gorgue where 38th (W) Division went into reserve for XI Corps. The battalion's companies were attached to the Guards Division for their introduction to the front line:

- A Company to 1st Scots Guards
- B Company to 3rd Grenadier Guards
- C Company to 1st Coldstream Guards
- D Company to 2nd Irish Guards

On the evening of 19 December B and D Companies went up to the front line to join their respective battalions while A and C Companies remained in billets. The companies then relieved each other over following days as the Guards battalions rotated between the front, support and reserve lines. There was a brief period of fraternisation with the enemy in No man's land on Christmas Day, but not on the scale of the 'Christmas truce' of 1914. 15th RWF's attachment to the Guards ended on 26 December and next day the battalion returned by bus to billets at Le Sart, near Merville.

From 8 January 1916 15th RWF began a long sequence of tours of duty in the trenches. This began at Richebourg-St-Vaast including the 'Boar's Head' post; the battalion usually alternated with 16th RWF and was billeted in Locon when not in the line. Enemy shelling was frequent and a considerable amount of labour was required to construct and repair trenches. In February the two battalions moved to carry out the same routine in the trenches at Givenchy and billets at Gorre, and in March at Festubert with reserve billets at Le Touret. The Festubert area was badly flooded and the line consisted of a chain detached posts or 'islands', which were mainly breastworks rather than trenches, with no communication trenches, so they could only be approached 'over the top' after dark. Givenchy was more dangerous because the drier ground made mine warfare possible. On one occasion the enemy fired a mine on 15th RWF's front, but had misjudged the distance, only creating a new crater in No man's land without breaching the battalion's line. There was a steady truckle of casualties with each spell in the line: by the end of March the battalion had lost 2 officers and 23 other ranks (ORs) killed or died of wounds, and 80 ORs wounded. On 18 April the division moved to the 'Moated Grange' sector just north of Neuve-Chapelle, where patrol actions were common among the mine craters. 15th RWF spent the last week of April training at La Gorgue and then on 1 May took over the line at Laventie, where it resumed the rotation with 16th RWF. On 7/8 May the battalion was in the line at Fauquissart when it carried out a trench raid on the enemy. While crossing No man's land the 53-strong raiding party under Captain Goronwy Owen came upon an enemy party that had just finished laying out barbed wire. Owen immediately changed his plans and instead of attacking, his raiders quietly followed the wiring party back into their own lines before setting upon them while bombing parties worked their way down the firebays of the crowded trench. They caused about 50–60 casualties for the loss of 2 officers and 3 ORs killed or missing, and 9 ORs wounded, mainly by rifle fire from the German support trench during the withdrawal. The raid was considered so successful that it was mentioned in Sir Douglas Haig's next despatch, and among the medals awarded was a Distinguished Service Order (DSO) for Capt Owen.

15th RWF went back to La Gorgue on 20 May for training. During bombing instruction someone dropped a live grenade: 2nd Lt W.M. Morgan groped for it in the mud and threw it away before it exploded, saving several lives. He was awarded the Albert Medal for Lifesaving 2nd Class. The battalion returned to the Moated Grange trenches 25–29 May and 2–7 June. At this time the BEF was preparing for that summer's 'Big Push' on the Western Front (the Battle of the Somme). On 10 June 38th (W) Division was withdrawn from the line and sent to a training area around Tincques and Villers-Brûlin. Here it practised 'trench-to-trench' attacks. At the end of the month it began a long and tiring march south and on 3 July it joined XVII Corps' reserve, with 15th RWF at Ribemont.

=== Mametz Wood ===
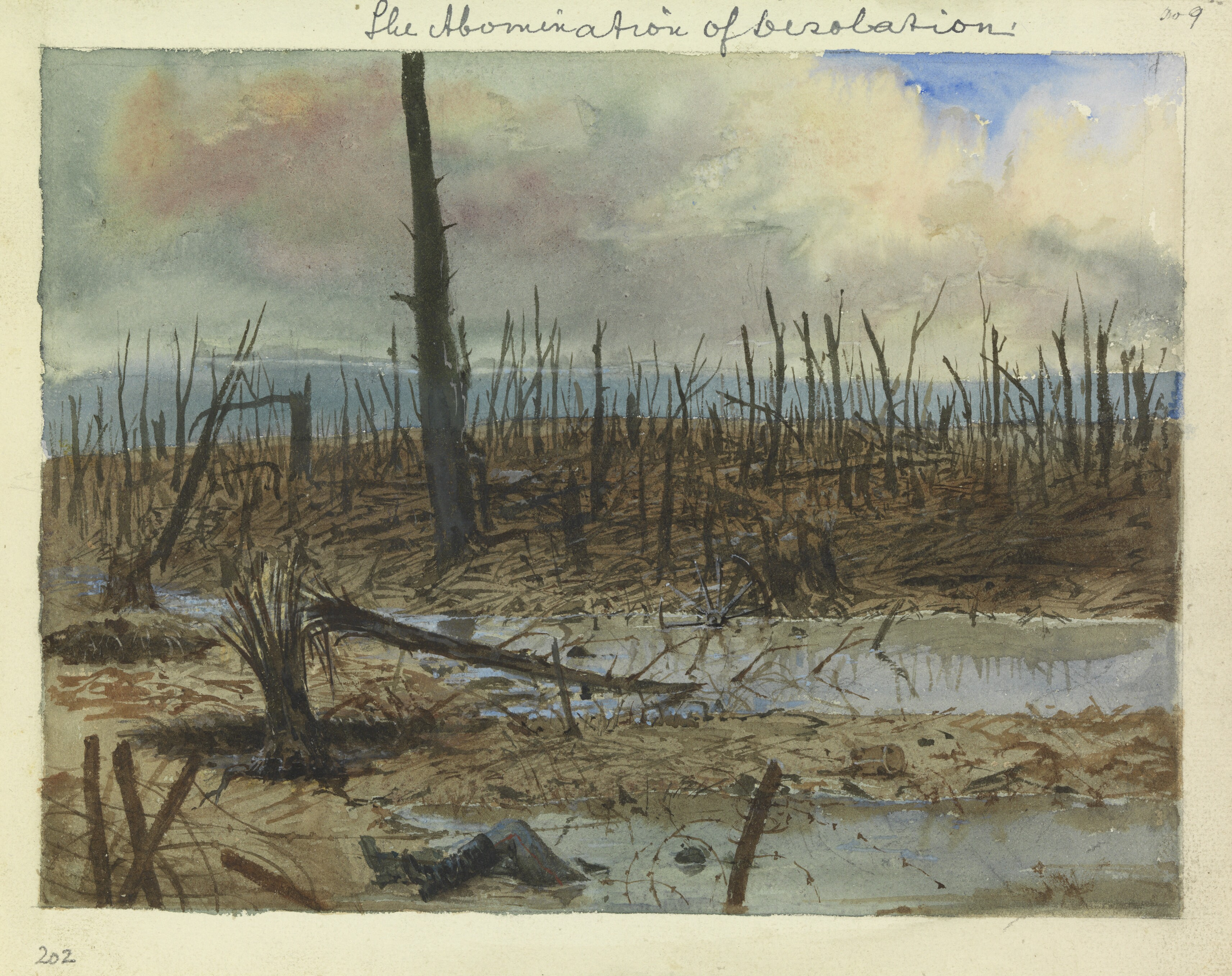
The Abomination of Desolation, sketch by J.B. Morrall of Mametz Wood after the 1916 fighting.

The Somme Offensive had begun on 1 July with a disastrous attack across a wide front. 38th (W) Division had been warned to accompany the cavalry in exploiting a breakthrough towards Bapaume. There was no breakthrough: instead the division was switched to the Mametz sector, where there had been some success. On the afternoon of 5 July it took over the front line, with 15th RWF in 'Queen's Nullah', 'Bottom Wood', 'Bunny Alley' and 'Bunny Trench', 'White Trench ' and 'Cliff Trench'. Here it was systematically bombarded for two days by German 5.9-inch guns, suffering numerous casualties. On 7 July 38 (W) Division was ordered to capture Mametz Wood. The initial attack on the south-east corner, the 'Hammerhead', was assigned to 115th Bde . Three attacks across the valley were held up by machine gun fire despite repeated bombardments of the edge of the wood. None of the infantry could get within 250 yards (230 m) of the Hammerhead, and were lying out in the valley under fire, tired out and wet through from the rain.

15th RWF had waited all day in Cliff Trench to exploit any success by 115th Bde, with instructions to clear up the southern part of the wood. At 18.30, according to its War Diary, the battalion organised a 'small operation' to do this, led by the lieutenant temporarily commanding A Company. The defenders' machine gun fire revealed their strength and the operation 'was not pushed on'. Casualties amounted to 1 officer wounded and 11 ORs killed and wounded. The battalion was unaware that it was supposed to have been part of a larger operation by 17th (Northern) Division (west) and 115th Bde (east) against the southern part of the wood. (115th Brigade was not actually reorganised in time to take part.) Brigadier-General Llewelyn Price-Davies of 113th Bde was visiting 15th RWF when this attack went in at 20.00. He had not been informed of the attack, but he endeavoured to organise supporting fire, until the Lewis gun jammed. He complained that if he had been told, he could have provided heavy covering fire from 15th RWF's positions. As it was, he wrote, 'the attack fizzled out'.

38th (W) Division was then ordered to attack Mametz Wood with its full weight. The operation planned for 9 July was postponed, but the attack went in early on 10 July, 113th and 114th Bdes leading, with 115th Bde in reserve. 113th Brigade attacked with 16th RWF, 14th RWF supporting; 15th RWF was drawn up in Bunny Trench in reserve by 02.15. At Zero (04.15) 15th RWF moved up to Queen's Nullah and White Trench behind 14th RWF and formed four company lines in attack formation, A Company leading. 16th RWF reached the edge of the wood with heavy casualties, bunched to the left, and 14th RWF, following closely behind, came up alongside bunched to the right. Confused and bitter fighting followed amongst the tangled woods. In response to appeals for reinforcements Brig-Gen Price-Davies sent up 15th RWF, which entered the wood where the officers found control extremely difficult. There were reports that the attackers had passed through their own barrage, or that the British guns were firing short: Capt John. Edwards, commanding C Company, 15th RWF, suggested that many of these shells had exploded prematurely among the treetops, an explanation later accepted by the Official History (along with the bad fuzes of many British shells). Troops of 15th and 16th RWF bombed their way up 'Strip Trench' and reached the southern ride crossing the wood (the first objective), where they were joined by 13th RWF. But 'Wood Support Trench' to the west (an objective of 17th (N) Division) was still held by the enemy, and enfilade machine gun fire from there prevented any further organised advance. The only way forward was to form ad hoc fighting patrols to push through the dense undergrowth. 15th RWF was in contact with troops of 17th (N) Division in 'Wood Trench' and most of 113th and 114th Bdes were now in the wood, with at least seven battalions mixed up together. Because of this overcrowding, 14th, 15th and 16th RWF were pulled back. Then while 13th RWF bombed their way up Wood Support Trench 115th Bde was sent in to make fresh attacks, which were equally costly. However, the Germans had been badly hit as well, with many taken prisoner, and by the end of the day the southern half of Mametz Wood and most of the Hammerhead were in 38th (W) Division's hands. During the night 115th Bde took over control of the fighting and relieved 15th RWF, which had withdrawn to Queen's Nullah by 10.00 on 11 July. The battalion had captured 80–90 prisoners and 4 machine guns. Its casualties on 10–11 July were 2 officers and 20 ORs killed or died of wounds, 4 officers and 132 ORs wounded, and 1 officer and 19 ORs missing (of whom 4 were later known to have been killed or died of wounds, and 8 wounded). The CO, Lt-Col Bell, and the Medical Officer (MO) were also slightly wounded but remained at duty.

15th RWF marched out and went by train and road to Ergnies where it rested until 14 July. It was then taken by bus to Authie, and by 18 July it was in bivouacs at Coigneux, supplying working parties for 114th and 115th Bdes, which had taken over trenches at Hébuterne where the fighting had died down after 1 July. The battalion did a spell in the trenches at Auchonvillers 24–28 July, then on 30 July entrained at Doullens as 38th (W) Division moved to the Ypres Salient. The division spent most of the next year holding trenches facing Pilckem Ridge, spending the time improving the trenches and carrying out raids. Casualties were light in late 1916, but the drain on resources on the Somme front meant that the battalions in the Salient received few reinforcements, and remained considerably understrength.

=== Winter 1916–17 ===
After training at St Jan ter Biezen near Poperinge, 15th RWF went into the support lines in the Canal Bank sector on 21 August. It then began alternating with 16th RWF between the front line and support trenches along the west bank of the Yser Canal and the reserve camps. On 18 September Lt-Col Bell returned to the Central India Horse serving elsewhere on the Western Front (he received a DSO in the 1917 New Year Honours). Major Compton 'Crump' Norman, a regular RWF officer, was promoted to replace him.

After thorough reconnaissance over several days, the battalion sent out a 65-strong raiding party on the evening of 13 October supported by artillery and trench mortars, which effectively suppressed the enemy machine guns. The mortars had badly damaged the enemy trenches and the raiders met little opposition, apart from showers of bombs thrown from the close support trench. The raiders came back with 4 prisoners and some captured equipment. The German retaliatory bombardment was described as 'feeble' and missed the British trenches. The battalion's casualties were 12 ORs wounded, mostly slight, and 1 missing. On 14 December the battalion entrained for Bollezeele, where it underwent training until NewYear. When 38th (W) Division returned to the line 15th RFW provided working parties for cable laying and some training until it went back into the Canal Bank sector on 14 January 1917. A period of cold weather meant that the canal and the ground were frozen over, digging became impossible, and cases of Trench foot increased. The battalion was withdrawn for further training at Millam 23–29 March before returning to the 'Lancashire Farm' sector at Canal Bank. In late March the British heavy artillery increased its firing on key enemy positions, and the Germans retaliated by shelling the canal bridges, particularly Bridge 6D in 15th RWF's sector, which was known as 'Blighty Bridge' from the number of casualties (including many 'Blighty wounds') that were suffered around it.

=== Pilckem Ridge ===
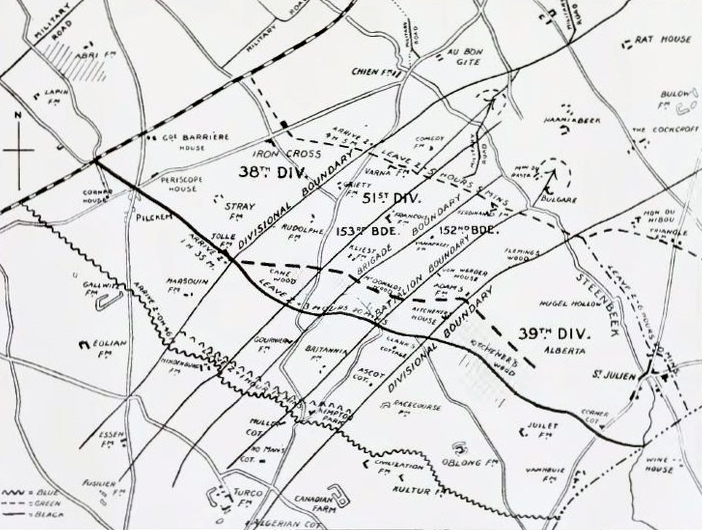
38th (W) Division's attack at Pilckem Ridge, 31 July 1917.

In May 1917 38th (W) Division was warned that the British would launch an offensive (the Third Battle of Ypres) on the division 's front during the summer, and training was intensified: 15th RWF was training at Houtkerque and Ochtezeele from 20 May to 10 June. Other preparations included digging assembly trenches and even a new front line trench 300 yards (270 m) closer to the enemy. The Germans seem to have regarded this as a feint, and took little notice. Towards the end of June the whole division was taken out of the line and went to the St Hilaire area to train for the attack over replica trenches and strongpoints, carefully timed to match the creeping barrage that would be fired by the artillery. On 16 July the return march to the front began, and by 20 July 38th (W) Division was back in the line. The battalions were constantly called on for working parties to complete preparations for the much-delayed offensive. German artillery was active over both the front and rear areas attempting to disrupt the preparations with high explosive and the new mustard gas, causing numerous casualties. The opening of the offensive was finally fixed for 31 July. The British preliminary bombardment had begun as far back as 12 June, and on the morning of 27 July the Royal Flying Corps reported that the enemy trenches in front of 38th (W) and Guards Division were unoccupied. The two divisions were ordered to send forward patrols to test the defences. 38th (W) Division tasked 15th RWF and 15th Welsh each with sending two platoons out at 17.30. The Guards found that the Germans had evacuated the whole of their first position to avoid the shelling, and they were able to establish a line across the canal. The two Welsh battalions advancing from the canal also found the German front line unoccupied, but discovered that the support and reserve lines were still strongly garrisoned, as well as the whole of the second position. A Company 15th RWF had almost reached 'Cactus Junction' when the German opened a heavy fire on them, inflicting heavy casualties. The company commander, Maj Evan Davies, was wounded and captured, as were most of the men sent forward. A platoon of D Company went up in support and was also badly cut up. The enemy continued shelling the division's line, but 15th RWF was relieved on 28 July to go back to Dublin Camp to prepare for the assault. On the evening of 30 July the battalion marched up towards the assembly trenches with a fighting strength of 12 officers and 420 ORs. A reconnaissance party examined the canal bridges: most had been smashed by the enemy's shelling, but Bridge 6Z was still crossable. The battalion went over this bridge and by 02.30 on 31 July had formed up in the assembly trenches on the east side of the canal. The enemy was unusually quiet, which was attributed to the heavy gas shelling of their positions.

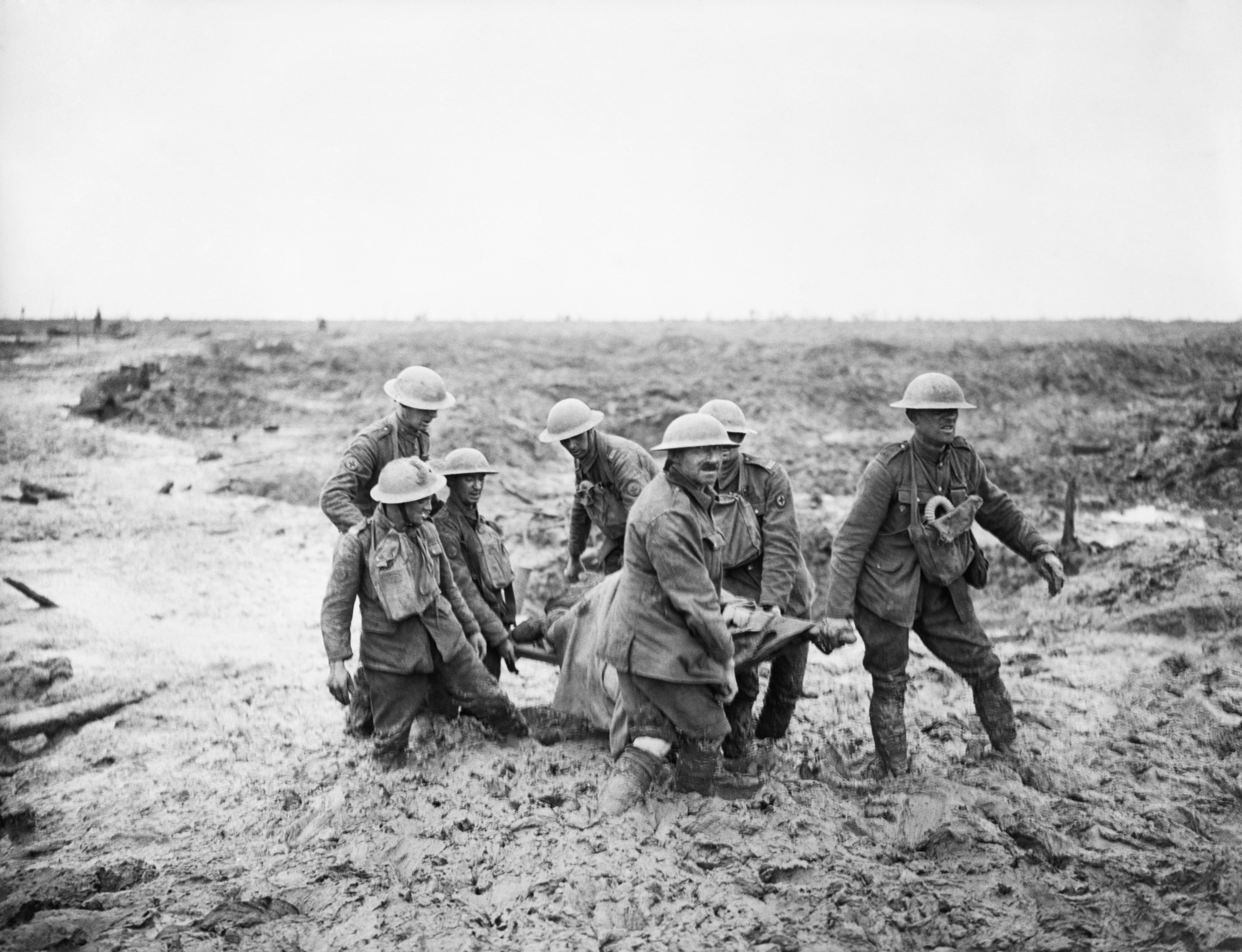
Stretcher-bearers struggle through the mud after the Battle of Pilckem Ridge, 1 August 1917 (Photograph by John Warwick Brooke).

The plan for 38th (W) Division's attack was that 113th (left) and 114th Bdes (right) would advance up the slope and capture three successive objectives (the Blue, Black and Green Lines), including the fortified Pilckem village and the pillbox at 'Iron Cross' crossroads. Then 115th Bde would pass through and descend from Iron Cross Ridge to capture the line of the Steenbeek stream (the 'Green Dotted Line'). The 113th Brigade led with two companies each from 13th and 16th RWF to take the Blue Line, the other companies to take the Black Line, then 15th RWF would pass through to take the Green Line. Zero was at 03.50 when it was still dark, and the troops following the barrage had difficulty keeping direction. The advance to the Blue Line was carried out easily, but opposition increased on the way to the Black Line, including fighting in Pilckem village. 15th RWF following behind suffered a few casualties from the German barrage and snipers in Pilckem, but was ready on time to attack from the Black Line. It was supported by two companies from 16th RWF and six Lewis gun teams from 14th RWF. The battalion ran into serious opposition at 'Battery Copse' and from the fortified houses and pillboxes around the railway crossing, By the time the men got through this they had fallen behind the barrage, but the smoke barrage fell amongst them, adding to the confusion. Casualties among the junior officers were heavy, and Lt-Col Norman was wounded about this time. Before he was evacuated he ordered the battalion to consolidate on 'Iron Cross Ridge'. As there were no other officers left in the front line, he handed the battalion over to Regimental Sergeant-Major Jones to carry this out. This had to be done some way short of the Green Line, leaving a bigger task for 115th Bde, which was passing through. During the afternoon it had begun to rain, and the positions in the Steenbeek valley became very muddy, hindering all further movement. 115th Brigade had to hold off heavy counter-attacks and 15th RWF remained holding its positions on Iron Cross Ridge in case these broke through. On the evening of 1 August orders were received to advance to relieve the remnants of 115th Bde, and Capt R. Bower arrived from the rear to take charge of the battalion. It was in position along the line of the Steenbeek by about 01.30 on 2 August. Shortly afterwards Capt Bower was wounded while going round the outposts; Capt S.A. Fitzsimons then took over temporary command. It was still raining and the ground was (in the words of the battalion war diary) 'a sea of mud'. It held the outposts for 'another awful night' on 3/4 August, and was finally relieved the following night, going back to Canal Bank. Here Capt Fitzsimons collapsed, and the command was taken over by a 2nd Lt Ratto. The battalion was taken by bus to Elverdinge Chateau, where it was provided with hot food and clean clothes, and then it entrained for a tented camp at Proven, where it got two weeks rest. Major Robert Montgomery of 13th Welsh Regiment arrived on 9 August to take command of 15th RWF. (After he recovered from his wound, Lt-Col Norman successively commanded 17th RWF, 2nd RWF and 14th RWF.)

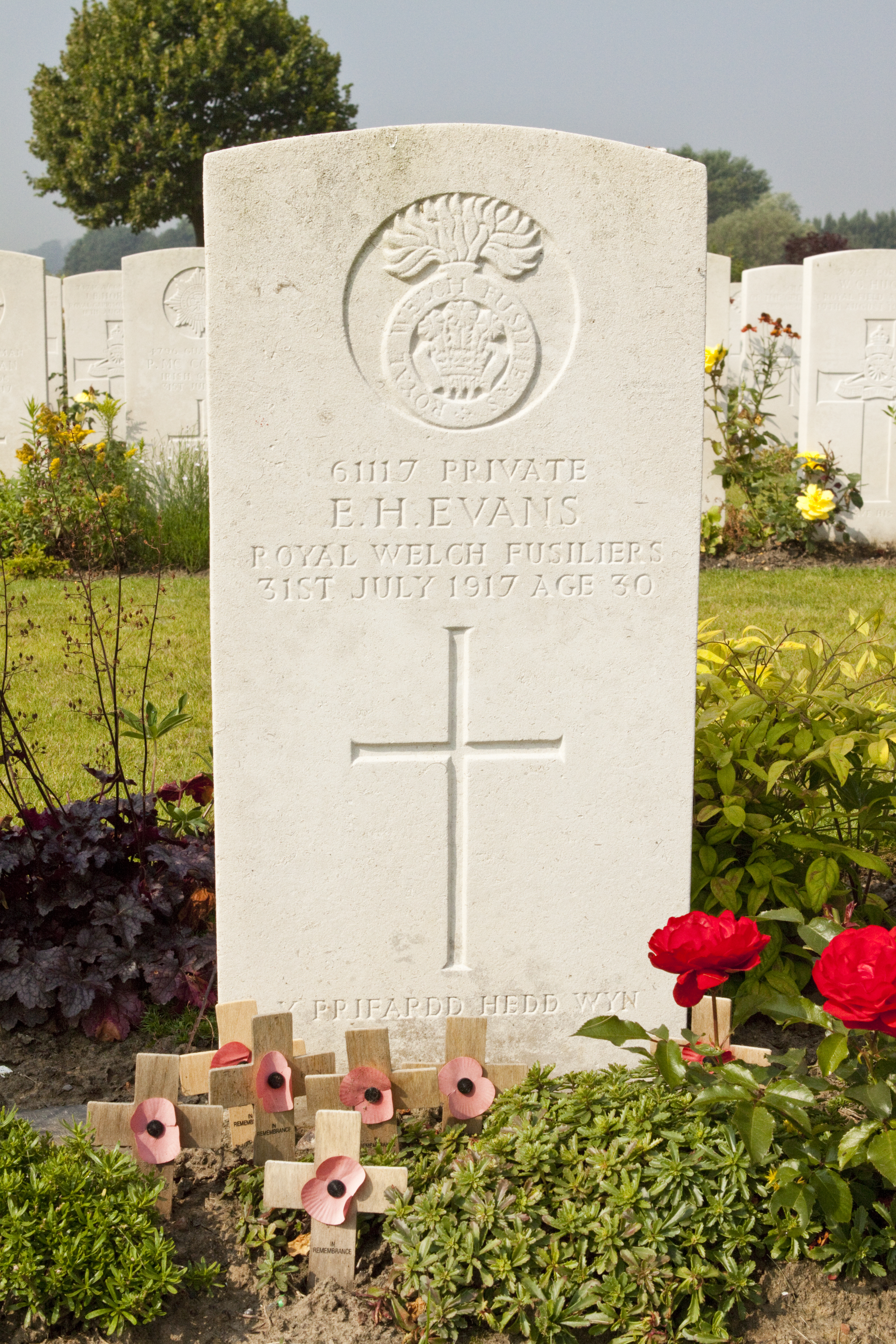
The grave of Hedd Wyn at Artillery Wood Cemetery.

Among the battalion's other casualties of 31 July was the shepherd and poet 'Hedd Wyn' (Private Ellis Humphrey Evans), who was fatally wounded and died at an aid post on 4 August. When the National Eisteddfod of Wales was held later that year Hedd Wyn had won the bardic chair: when called to take his place, it was announced that he was dead. The chair was left empty and draped in black. He was reburied at Artillery Wood Cemetery at Boezinge in 1919. His headstone bears the additional inscription Y Prifardd Hedd Wyn ('The Chief Bard, Hedd Wyn').

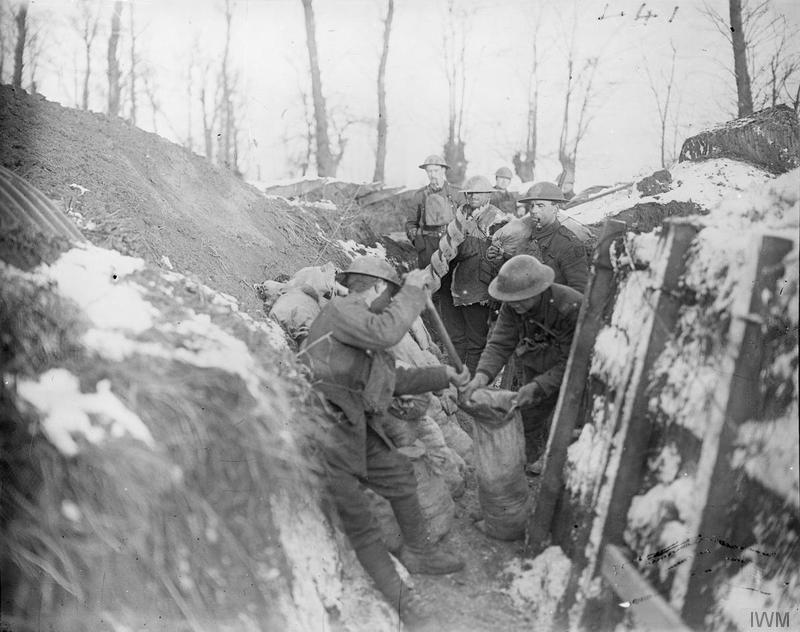

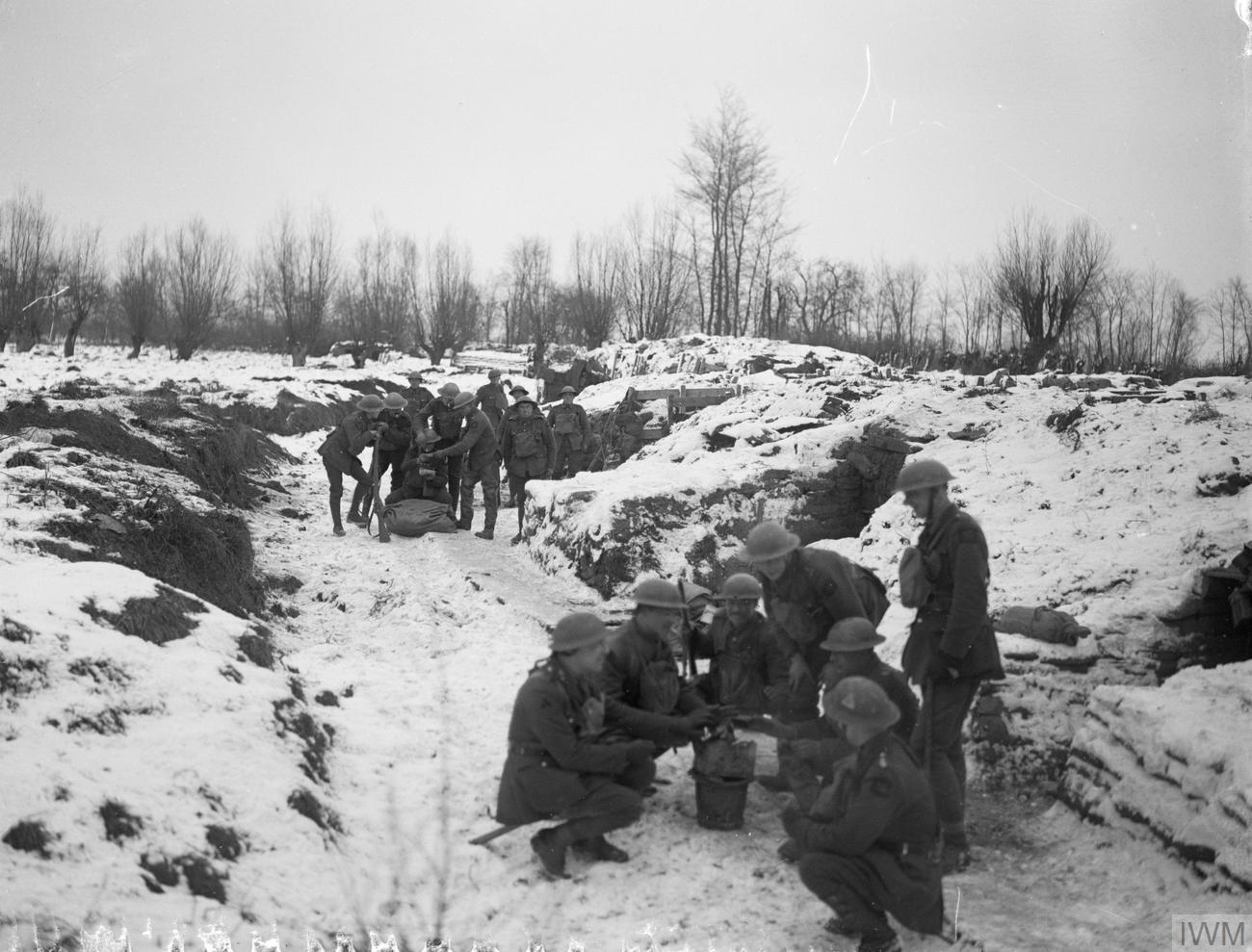

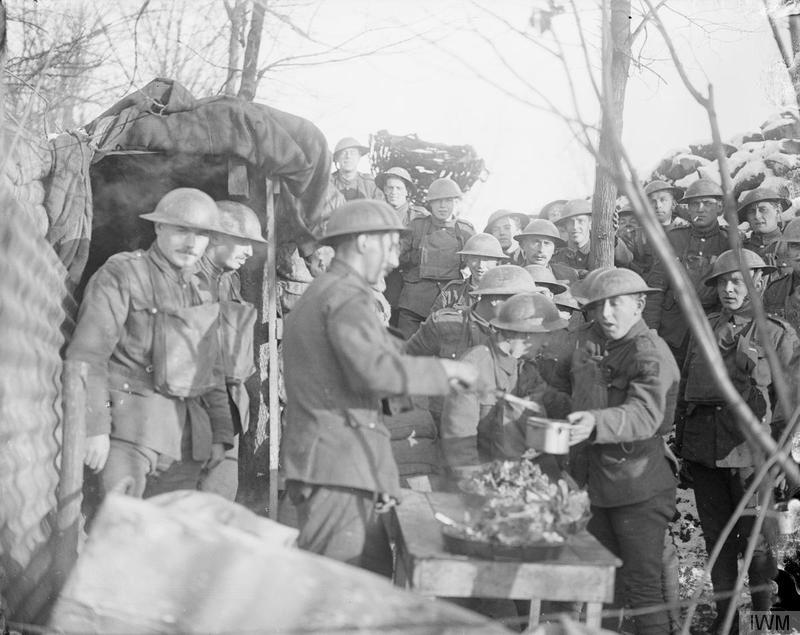
Above: 15th RWF near Fleubaix on 28 December 1917.

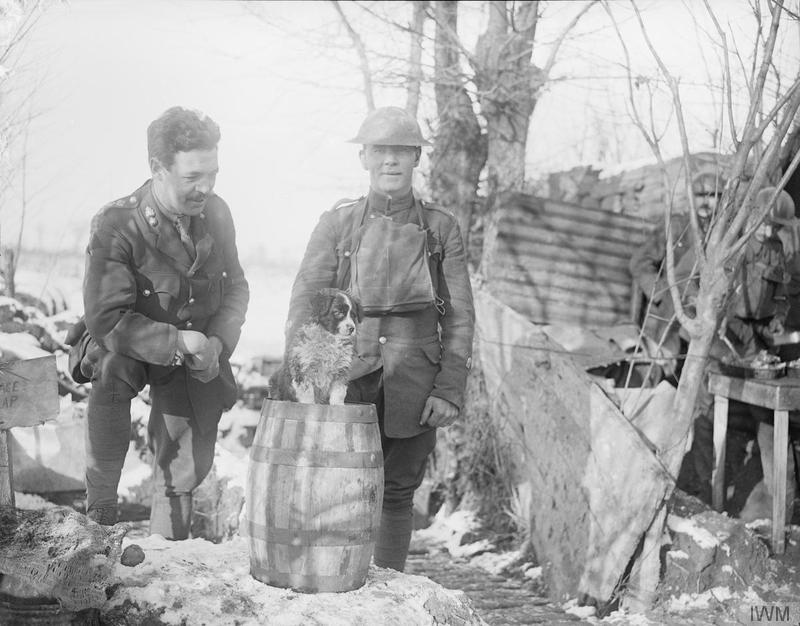
Captain Macdonald and RSM Jones of 15th RWF.

38th (W) Division returned to the line on 19 August after the Battle of Langemarck. 15th RWF went to bivouac at the recently captured 'Leipzig Farm', where it had to dig shelter trenches and was bombed by hostile aircraft; it moved camp to 'Talana Farm' four days later. Part of 38th (W) Division attacked on 27 August and 15th RWF went up to 'Candle Trench' in reserve, leaving the men not required behind in camp. However, the period of reserve was extended to 31 August before the men returned to Talana Farm. The battalion held the front line at Langemarck 1–4 September, then went into reserve at Leipzig Farm. 38th (W) Division was relieved on 11 September and 15th RWF spent a few days at 'Suez Camp' before the division left the Ypres Salient and moved south to Estaires in the Armentières sector,

=== Winter 1917–18 ===
Although Armentières and the Lys Valley was considered a quiet sector – 15th RWF reported its first shelling on 29 September, 10 days after arriving – the division had a wide front to hold with weak battalions (companies were reduced to two platoons each). Much of the time was spent trying to drain and improve the chain of defensive positions in the low-lying and waterlogged country, which were mainly breastworks rather than trenches. 15th RWF alternated with 14th RWF between the front line positions at Bois-Grenier in front of Fleurbaix and reserve at 'Artillery Farm'. The Germans in this sector were energetic raiders. On 11 December they opened a heavy barrage on the battalion's lines, under cover of which they raided the trenches between 'Patrick' and 'Pan' posts, only to find them unoccupied. They withdrew, leaving behind some of their equipment. On 28 December an official photographer visited 15th RWF, taking a number of pictures of the battalion that are now in the collection of the Imperial War Museum. The weather was so cold that when 15th RWF was relieved to go into rest billets at Fleurbaix on 1 January 1918 the transport section had considerable difficulty controlling the mules on the icy tracks. The battalion was back in the Bois-Grenier lines on 6 January, and early on 11 January the enemy opened an intense bombardment with trench mortars, under cover of which a 30-strong party attempted to enter the line at 'Peter Post'. They got through the wire and threw numerous stick grenades, but Sergeant Norman Davis organised the defence and the attack broke down (Davis was awarded the Military Medal (MM)). In mid-January 1918 38th (W) Division was withdrawn for an extended rest at Le Sart.

=== Disbandment ===
By early 1918 the BEF was suffering a manpower crisis. Brigades had to be reduced from four to three battalions, and the surplus war-formed battalions were broken up to provide reinforcements for others. On 6 February 32 officers and 600 ORs from 15th RWF were drafted to other battalions of the regiment within 38th (W) Division:

- A Company to 17th RWF
- B Company to 16th RWF
- C Company to 14th RWF
- D Company to 13th RWF

On 27 February the battalion was disbanded, the remaining men forming D Company of No 1 Entrenching Battalion, the bulk of which was provided by 10th Welsh Regiment.

== Insignia ==
The divisional insignia of 38th (Welsh) Division.

Until sufficient brass RWF cap badges could be obtained, the 15th RWF wore a collar badge. Embroidered titles were also worn at the top of the sleeve: officers had 'LONDON' over 'WELSH', while ORs wore 'LONDON.WELSH' as a single arc; both were in red on khaki. Later, instead of the standard 'R.W.F.' brass title on the ORs' shoulder straps, 15th RWF had a more elaborate title, with a grenade over 'R.W.F.' over '1st LONDON WELSH'. On 15 May 1915 all ranks of the service battalions were given permission to wear the RWF's famous 'Back Flash', of five overlapping black ribbons, 5 inches (13 cm) long, on the back of the service dress jacket beneath the collar.

38th (Welsh) Division adopted a scheme of coloured cloth geometric shapes worn on the upper arms to distinguish its brigades and units. 113th Brigade used a triangle, which in the case of the 15th RWF was yellow. Griffith describes this yellow badge as being the only way to distinguish the dead of 15th RWF in Mametz Wood. After 38th (W) Division adopted the Red dragon of Wales on a black cloth rectangle as a divisional sign during 1917, this was worn on the right arm and the brigade/battalion flash was worn on the left arm only. The yellow triangle was probably also painted on the helmet.

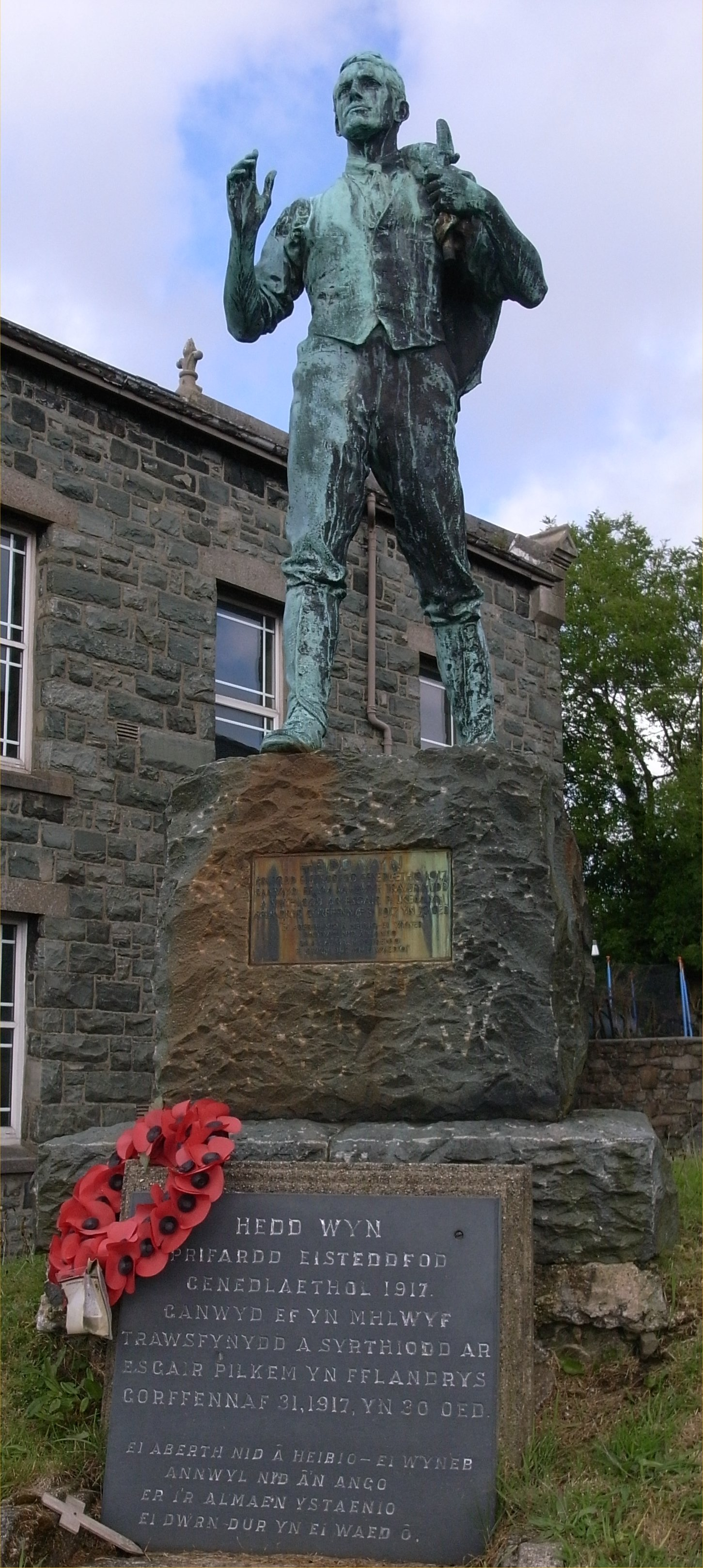
The statue of Hedd Wyn at Trawsfynydd.

== Memorials ==
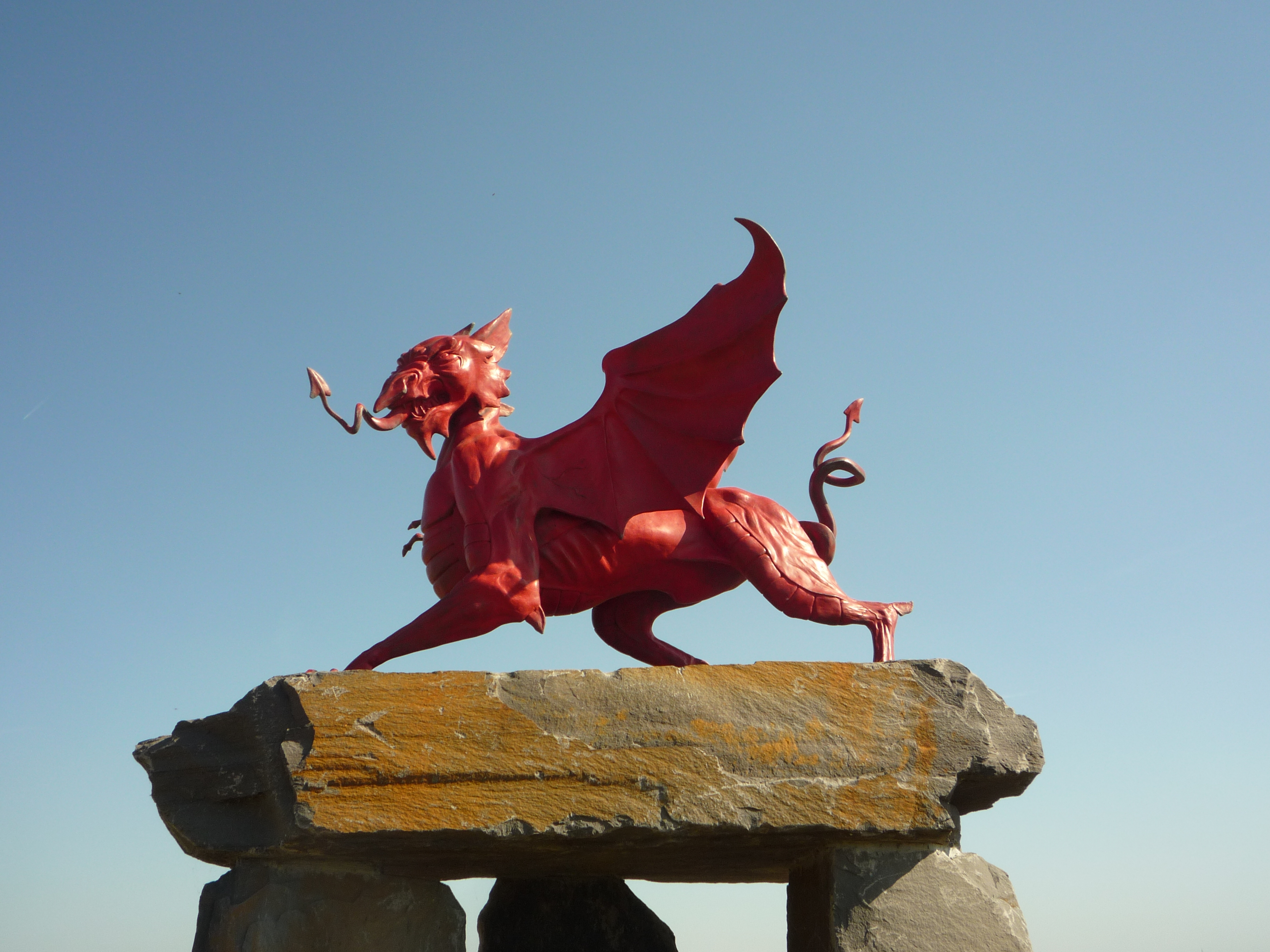
The Red Dragon of Wales atop the Cromlech of stones at the Welsh Memorial Park, Ypres.

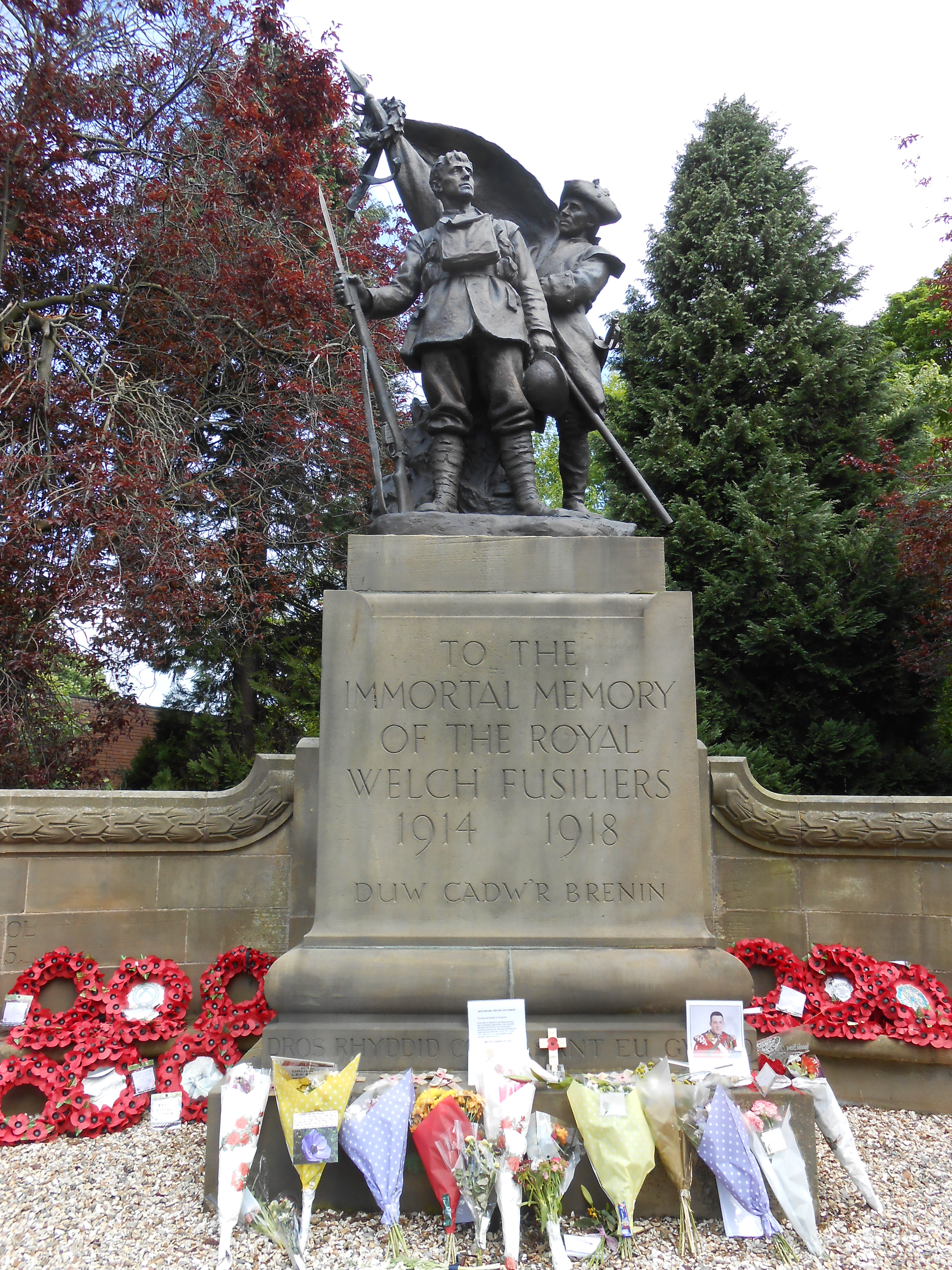
The Royal Welch Fusiliers Memorial, Wrexham.

There is a memorial plaque (see above) to the raising of the two battalions outside Gray's Inn Chapel in South Square Gardens.

The London Welsh Centre in Gray's Inn Road (close to Gray's Inn Gardens) was opened as a memorial in 1920.

Red dragon sculptures commemorating the service of the 38th (Welsh) Division have been erected at the Mametz Wood Memorial and Welsh Memorial Park, Ypres.

The regimental monument is the Royal Welch Fusiliers Memorial, Wrexham.

There is a statue of Hedd Wyn in his home village of Trawsfynydd.

After the Armistice with Germany war-formed battalions were granted a King's Colour. Although disbanded, the 15th RWF received one, which is still held by the Royal Welch Fusiliers.

== Other London Welsh units ==
The London Welsh Rifles were formed in 1861 as part of the Rifle Volunteer Movement. At the beginning of the year about 150 men were reported to be drilling at the Floral Hall in Covent Garden and at Sir Watkyn Williams-Wynn's house. In May 1861 drills were being held at the Ward School in Aldersgate. By January 1862 the unit had been accepted as the 5th (London Welsh) City of London Rifle Volunteer Corps of two companies and it adopted a silver badge bearing the title 'London Welsh Rifle Corps' with a rampant dragon as centrepiece. The unit had disappeared by May 1862.

99th (London Welsh) Heavy Anti-Aircraft Regiment, Royal Artillery, was formed on 1 April 1939 as part of the expansion of the Territorial Army just before the outbreak of World War II. Raised from Welshmen living in London it was affiliated to the Welsh Guards and was based at Iverna Gardens drill hall, Kensington. It served during the Battle of Britain and The Blitz, and then on Orkney. It landed in Normandy in June 1944 and operated in the mobile role through the North-West Europe Campaign. Postwar it was reformed in 1947 as 499th (London Welsh) HAA Regiment but by 1950 there were only three Welshmen serving in the unit and the following year it was retitled 499th (Kensington) HAA Regiment.
