= SS Holmbury =

Holmbury was the name of two ships of the Houlder Line.

- SS Holmbury (1925)
- SS Holmbury (1943)
