= Iverna Gardens drill hall =

Military building in Kensington, London, England

- Kensington, London
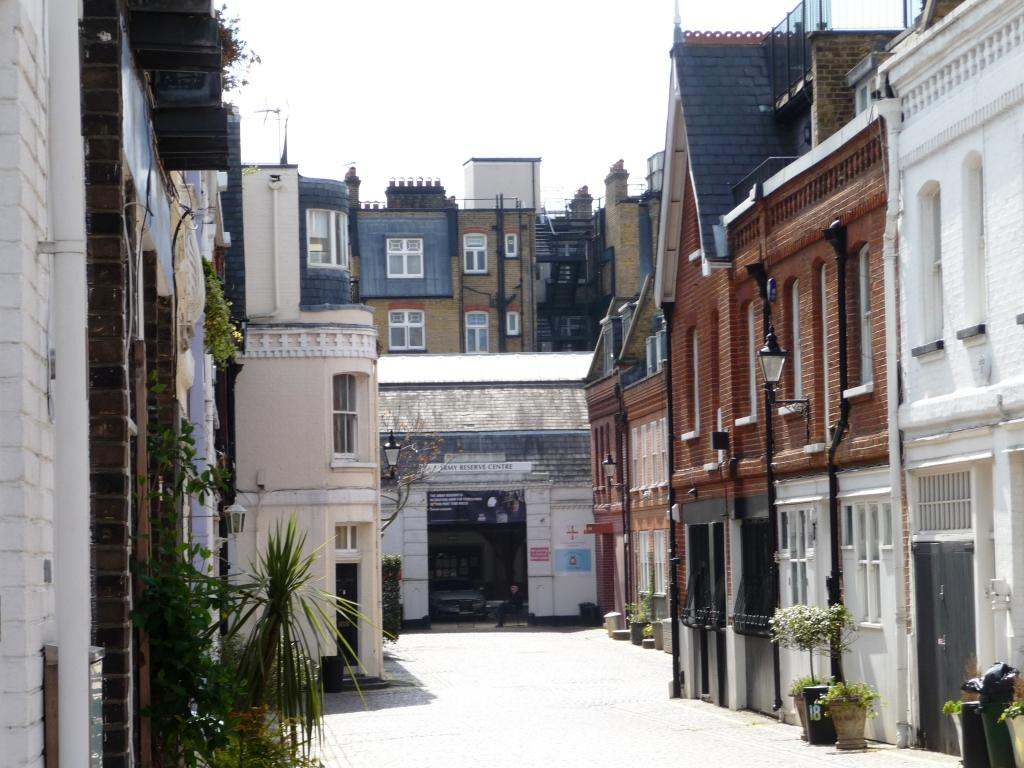
- Iverna Gardens drill hall

Site information
- Type: Drill Hall

Location
- Location within London
- Coordinates: 51.49851°N 0.19395°W

Site history
- Built: 1903
- Built for: War Office
- In use: 1903-Present

The Iverna Gardens drill hall is a military installation in Kensington, London.

== History ==
The drill hall was designed as the headquarters for the 4th (Kensington) Middlesex Volunteer Rifle Corps and completed in 1903. This unit became the 13th (County of London) Battalion, London Regiment (Kensington) in 1908. The battalion was mobilised at the drill hall in August 1914 before being deployed to the Western Front. In 1936, on the break-up of the London Regiment, the unit was re-designated the Princess Louise's Kensington Regiment, The Middlesex Regiment (Duke of Cambridge's Own). It was deployed to France as part of the British Expeditionary Force at the early stages of the Second World War but did not return to the drill hall after the war.

In 1939 the drill hall was instead occupied by the 99th (London Welsh) Heavy Anti-Aircraft Regiment, Royal Artillery; after seeing action in North West Europe in the closing stages of the Second World War, that unit was re-designated 499th (London Welsh) Heavy Anti-Aircraft Regiment Royal Artillery in 1947. By 1951, there were only three Welshmen serving in the regiment and in 1952 it was adopted by the Royal Borough of Kensington and changed its designation to 499th (Kensington) Heavy Anti-Aircraft Regiment, RA, and was then disbanded in 1955.

Since 2014 the drill hall has also been the home of B Detachment 256 (City of London) Multi-Role Medical Regiment. The drill hall also houses the Battalion Headquarters of The 7th Battalion, The Rifles.
