= Kensington Regiment (Princess Louise's) =

4th (Kensington) Middlesex Volunteer Rifle Corps 13th (County of London) Battalion, London Regiment (Kensington)
- Active: 1860–Present
- Country: United Kingdom
- Branch: Territorial Army
- Type: Infantry
- Size: Battalion
- Part of: London Regiment
- Garrison/HQ: Iverna Gardens drill hall (1903–c.1936)
- Website: http://www.plk.org.uk/

The Kensington Regiment (Princess Louise's) is a unit of the British Army, which originated in the Volunteer Rifle Corps' movement of the 1850s. In 1908, it became a battalion of the London Regiment in the Territorial Force. It was an infantry regiment from 1908 to 1940, a heavy fire support unit from 1940 to 1945, and has been a unit of the Royal Corps of Signals since 1945.

== History ==
=== Origins ===
The origins of the Kensington Regiment dated from 1859 with the formation of the Volunteer Force, part of a 'volunteer revival' as a result of a perceived French military threat, which had grown under the leadership of Napoleon III. A number of Volunteer Rifle Corps were formed in West London. These included the 2nd (South) Middlesex Volunteer Rifle Corps (VRC) formed under the patronage of the Viscount Ranelagh and the 4th Middlesex Volunteer Rifle Corps (VRC), formed under the patronage of the 2nd Baron Truro.

By 1892, both units had been linked as Volunteer Battalions to the King's Royal Rifle Corps, and continued this link until the formation of the Territorial Force in 1908. At this time, the headquarters of the 2nd (South Middlesex) was at Beaufort House, Walham Green and the 4th (West Middlesex) were at Iverna Gardens, High Street, Kensington.

=== Second Boer War ===
Men from both units voluntarily went out to South Africa with the City Imperial Volunteers, thereby earning their Corps the right to the Battle Honour of 'South Africa 1900-1902'.

=== Territorial Force ===
In 1908, as part of the Haldane Reforms of the Kingdom's volunteer forces, the "Kensingtons" Regiment was formed in an amalgamation of the 4th Middlesex V.R.C. and the 2nd (South) Middlesex, V.R.C., the newly minted unit being titled the 13th London Regiment (Kensingtons), T.F.. It based itself at the old 4th Middlesex V.R.C.'s Headquarters at Iverna Gardens in the Borough of Kensington, which adopted it as its local Regiment and consented for the new Regiment to use its name in its formation's title. The Regiment took its Latin unit motto Quid Nobis Ardui (English: Nothing is too arduous for us) from the Borough's Coat of Arms. Her Royal Highness the Princess Louise, Duchess of Argyll consented to the use of her name by the Regiment and it became officially designated as the Princess Louise's Kensingtons.

=== First World War ===
During World War I the regiment was increased to war fighting capacity, with three separate battalions being formed.

==== 1/13th London Regiment (1st Kensingtons Battalion) ====
This Battalion was mobilized on the declaration of war on 4 August 1914. In November 1914, it departed England for France, and saw action on the Western Front, including the battles of Neuve Chapelle (1915), Aubers Ridge (the Regiment's defining action in the War) (1915), Somme (1916), Arras (1917), Passchendaele (1917), Cambrai (1917), Somme (1918), & the Hundred Days Offensive (1918). It returned to the Corps' Headquarters in Kensington from France for demobilization in May 1919.

==== 2/13th London Regiment (2nd Kensingtons Battalion) ====
The Battalion was formed in August 1914 with the intention of acting as the Regiment's home training unit, furnishing reinforcements to the 1st Battalion in the field to replace losses sustained in action. However, by November 1914, it was decided by the War Office that, with the war's scale of operations rapidly escalating, the new 2nd battalions of the London Territorial Force's infantry regiments were also to be mobilized for active service in the field. The 2nd Kensingtons did send drafts of reinforcements to join the 1st Battalion in France throughout 1915 whilst it was training in England, but this was ended by the close of that year and the responsibility for the Regiment's reinforcement supply was transferred to the 3rd Battalion, in preparation for the 2nd Battalion's departure on active service.

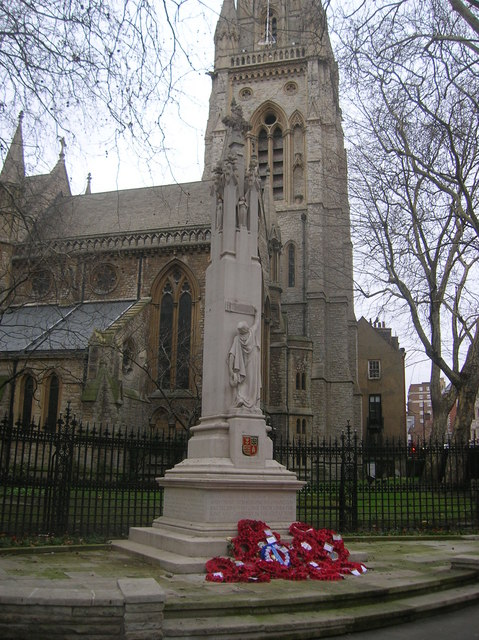
The Kensington Battalions' War Memorial outside St Mary Abbotts, Kensington High Street.

The 2nd Kensingtons was dispatched to Ireland in April 1916 to deal with the Fenian Revolution. Afterwards, it saw action on the Western Front in France (1916); Salonika (1917), taking part the Battle of Doiran; and Palestine (1917–1918), taking part in the Third Battle of Gaza, the Battle of Jerusalem, Capture of Jericho, the First Transjordan attack on Amman, Second Transjordan attack on Shunet Nimrin and Es Salt and the Battle of Sharon. The Battalion was broken up and demobilized in camps at Sidi Bashir in Egypt, and Mersin in Asia Minor in February to March 1919.

==== 3/13th London Regiment (3rd Kensingtons Battalion) ====
The 3rd Battalion was formed in November 1914 as the home training battalion of the Regiment with responsibility for supplying reinforcement drafts to the Regiment's two fighting battalions in the field, a role that it fulfilled until the end of the conflict in late 1918.

=== Interwar ===
1/13th Battalion reverted to its title of 13th Battalion post-war. The three battalions' war memorial was unveiled outside St Mary Abbots on Kensington High Street by Princess Louise, Duchess of Argyll on 1 July 1922 and was later adapted to also commemorate its World War Two dead. In 1937, on the break-up of the London Regiment, its 13th Battalion was re-designated the Princess Louise's Kensington Regiment, The Middlesex Regiment (Duke of Cambridge's Own). In 1938 the Kensingtons became a two-battalion regiment.

=== Second World War ===
During the Second World War, the regiment changed its role from infantry to a heavy fire support unit armed with mortars, medium machine-guns and Oerlikon anti-aircraft guns. The 1st Kensingtons served with the British Expeditionary Force in France, and later deployed to North Africa to be part of British First Army to prepare for the Sicilian campaign, and later the Italian front, with the 78th Battleaxe Infantry Division. The 2nd Kensingtons served first in Iceland and were to see action from Normandy to Arnhem, with the 49th (West Riding) Infantry Division.

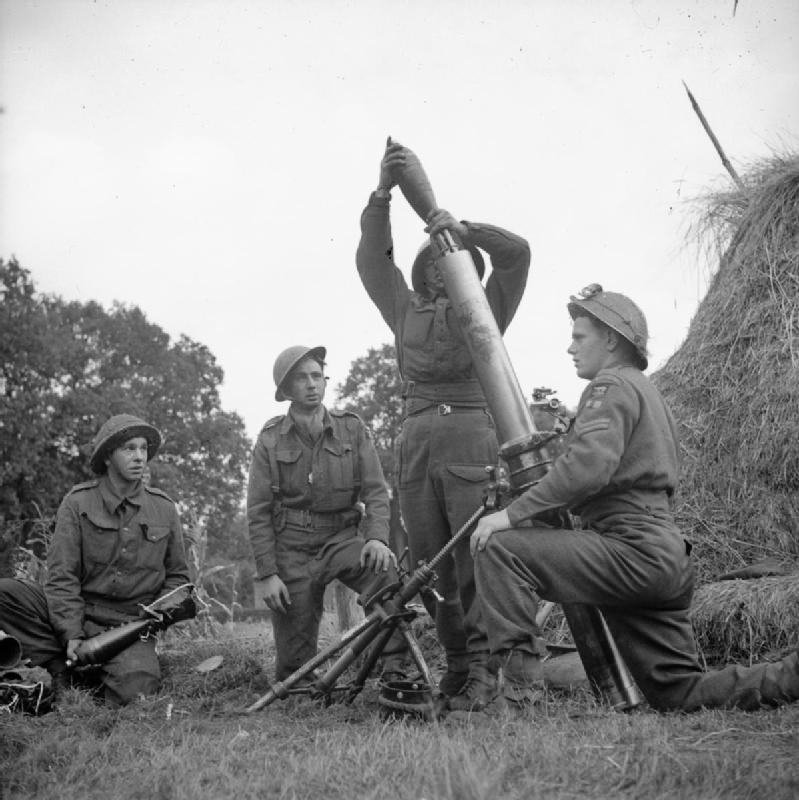
4.2-inch mortar of the 2nd Kensington Regiment, 49th (West Riding) Infantry Division in action at Turnhout, Belgium, 1 October 1944

=== Postwar ===
In 1947, the Regiment became part of the Royal Corps of Signals with the Army Phantom Signal Regiment (Princess Louise's Kensington Regiment). The regiment was re-formed as 41 (Princess Louise's Kensington) Signal Regiment in 1961 and became a trunk communications Signal Regiment with squadrons in Portsmouth, Coulsdon and Hammersmith. In 1967, with the reorganisation of the Territorial Army, the unit became a squadron of 31 (City of London) Signal Regiment. The Squadron was reassigned from 31 (City of London) Signal Regiment to 38 (City of Sheffield) Signal Regiment in 2010.

In 2014, 41 (Princess Louise's Kensington) Signal Squadron was amalgamated with 47 (Middlesex Yeomanry) Squadron to form 31 (Middlesex Yeomanry and Princess Louise's Kensington) Signal Squadron, part of 71 (Yeomanry) Signal Regiment.

== Publications ==
- Bailey, Sergeant O. F. and Hollier, H. M., (1935) The Kensingtons 13th London Regiment, London, Regimental Old Comrades Association
- Beckett, Ian F. W., (1982) Riflemen Form: A Study of the Rifle Volunteer Movement 1859–1908, Aldershot, The Ogilby Trusts, ISBN 0-85936-271-X.
- Joslen, H. F. (2003) [1960]. Orders of Battle: Second World War, 1939–1945. Uckfield, East Sussex: Naval and Military Press. ISBN 978-1-84342-474-1.
