= SS Holmbury (1943) =

Cargo ship (built 1943, scrapped 1970)

History
- Name: Empire Canyon (1943–47); Holmbury (1947–60); Ilyasbaksh (1960–70)
- Owner: Ministry of War Transport (1943–45); Ministry of Transport (1945–47); Alexander Shipping Co Ltd (1947–60); United Oriental Shipping Co Ltd (1960-65); Indian Government (1965–70)
- Operator: F C Strick & Co Ltd (1943–45); Capper, Alexander & Co Ltd (1945–47); Houlder Bros Ltd (1947–60); United Oriental Shipping Co Ltd (1960–65)
- Port of registry: (United Kingdom) Dundee (1943–47); United Kingdom (1947–60); (Pakistan) Karachi (1960–65); India (1965–70)
- Builder: Caledon Shipbuilding & Engineering Co Ltd
- Yard number: 408
- Launched: 11 November 1943
- Completed: December 1943
- Identification: Code Letters BFLF (1943–60); United Kingdom Official Number 166216 (1943–60)
- Fate: Scrapped 1970.

General characteristics
- Tonnage: 7,058 GRT; 4,871 NRT
- Length: 431 ft 3 in (131.45 m)
- Beam: 56 ft 3 in (17.15 m)
- Depth: 35 ft 2 in (10.72 m)
- Installed power: Triple expansion steam engine
- Propulsion: Screw propeller

Holmbury was a 7,058 GRT cargo ship which was built in 1943 for the Ministry of War Transport (MoWT) as Empire Canyon. In 1947 she was sold and renamed Holmbury. In 1960, she was sold to Pakistan and renamed Ilyasbaksh. In 1965, she was detained by India as war had broken out between India and Pakistan. She was declared a war prize and seized by the Indian Government. She was scrapped in 1970.

== Description ==
The ship was built by Caledon Shipbuilding & Engineering Co Ltd, Dundee, as yard number 408. She was launched on 11 November 1943 and completed in December.

The ship was 431 feet 3 inches (131.45 m) long, with a beam of 56 feet 3 inches (17.15 m) and a depth of 35 feet 2 inches (10.72 m). Her GRT was 7,058, with a NRT of 4,871.

She was propelled triple expansion steam engine which had cylinders of 24 1/2 inches (62 cm), 39 inches (99 cm) and 70 inches (180 cm) diameter by 48 inches (120 cm) stroke. The engine was built by North East Marine Engine Co (1938) Ltd, Newcastle upon Tyne.

== History ==
Empire Canyon was built for the MoWT. She was placed under the management of F Strick & Co Ltd. The Official Number 166216 and Code Letters BFKF were allocated and her port of registry was Dundee.

Empire Canyon was a member of a number of convoys during the Second World War.

HX 308

Convoy HX 308 departed New York on 13 September 1944 and arrived at Liverpool on 28 September. Empire Canyon joined the convoy at Halifax, Nova Scotia on 15 September. She was carrying a cargo of lumber bound for London.

In 1945, management was transferred to Capper, Alexander & Co Ltd. In 1947, Empire Canyon was sold to Alexander Shipping Co Ltd and renamed Holmbury, the second Alexander Line ship to bear this name. She was placed under the management of Houlder Bros Ltd.

In 1960, Holmbury was sold to United Oriental Shipping Co Ltd, Karachi, Pakistan and renamed Ilyasbaksh. On 12 August 1965, she arrived at Bombay requiring repairs to her rudder. Whilst repairs were being carried out she was detained by India as a state of war had been declared against Pakistan. In October 1965, Ilyasbaksh was seized by the Indian Government. She was scrapped at Bombay in December 1970.
