= Royal Welch Fusiliers =

Line infantry regiment of the British Army

23rd Regiment of Foot Welch Regiment of Fusiliers Royal Welch Regiment of Fusiliers Royal Welch Fusiliers
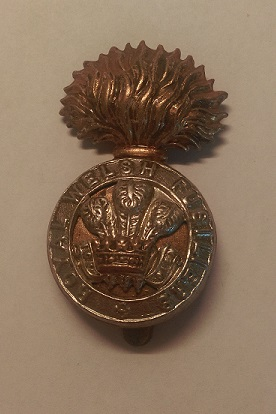
- Cap badge
- Active: 16 March 1689 – 28 February 2006
- Country: Kingdom of England (1689–1707); Kingdom of Great Britain (1707–1800); United Kingdom (1801–2006)
- Branch: British Army
- Type: Infantry
- Role: Line infantry
- Size: 1–2 Regular battalions 4–12 Volunteer and Territorial battalions Up to 25 hostilities-only battalions
- Garrison/HQ: Hightown Barracks, Wrexham
- Nicknames: The Nanny Goats; The Royal Goats
- Motto: Ich Dien
- Anniversaries: St. David's Day (1 March)
- Engagements: Williamite War in Ireland; Nine Years' War; War of the Spanish Succession; War of the Austrian Succession; Seven Years' War; American War of Independence; French Revolutionary Wars; Napoleonic Wars; Crimean War; Second China War; Indian Mutiny; Third Anglo-Burmese War; Second Boer War; First World War; Second World War; The Troubles; Yugoslav Wars

Commanders
- Ceremonial chief: The King
- Colonel of the Regiment: Major-General Brian Plummer

Insignia
- Tactical Recognition Flash
- Hackle: White

The Royal Welch Fusiliers (Welsh: Ffiwsilwyr Brenhinol Cymreig) was a line infantry regiment of the British Army, and part of the Prince of Wales's Division, that was founded in 1689, shortly after the Glorious Revolution. In 1702, it was designated a fusilier regiment and became the Welch Regiment of Fusiliers; the prefix "Royal" was added in 1713, then confirmed in 1714 when George I named it the Prince of Wales's Own Royal Regiment of Welsh Fusiliers. In 1751, after reforms that standardised the naming and numbering of regiments, it became the 23rd Regiment of Foot (Royal Welsh Fuzileers). In 1881, the final title of the regiment was adopted.

It retained the archaic spelling of Welch, instead of Welsh, and Fuzileers for Fusiliers; these were engraved on swords carried by regimental officers during the Napoleonic Wars. After the 1881 Childers Reforms, normal spelling was used officially, but "Welch" continued to be used informally until restored in 1920 by Army Order No.56.

It should not be confused with the Welch Regiment, a different unit (formed in 1881 from the 41st and 69th) which recruited in South and West, rather than North Wales, and became part of the Royal Regiment of Wales or RRW in 1969.

One of the few regiments to retain its original title, in March 2006 the Royal Welch Fusiliers was amalgamated with the RRW and became 1st Battalion, Royal Welsh, with RRW as the 2nd Battalion.

== History ==
=== Formation; 1689 to 1773 ===
The regiment was raised by Henry Herbert at Ludlow on 16 March 1689, following the 1688 Glorious Revolution and exile of James II. It served throughout the 1689 to 1691 Williamite War in Ireland, including the Battle of the Boyne in July 1690, and the Battle of Aughrim in 1691 which brought the campaign to an end. It joined Allied forces fighting in the Nine Years War and at Namur in August 1695, took part in the attack on the Terra Nova earthwork that inspired the song 'The British Grenadiers.'

On the outbreak of the War of the Spanish Succession in 1702, it became the Welch Regiment of Fuzilieers; this denoted units equipped with light-weight muskets or 'fusils' used to protect the artillery, although the distinction later became obsolete. It served throughout Marlborough's campaigns in the Low Countries, including the battles of Schellenberg, Blenheim and Ramillies.

Regimental grenadiers in 1715, 1745 and 1814

In 1714, George I gave it the title of the Prince of Wales's Own Royal Regiment of Welsh Fusiliers. The next 28 years were spent on garrison duty in England and Scotland, until it returned to Flanders in 1742 for the War of the Austrian Succession. At Dettingen in June 1743, it rallied after being driven back by the elite French Maison du Roi cavalry; its steadiness was a major contribution to what is considered a fortunate victory. It incurred 323 casualties at Fontenoy in May 1745, before a brief period in Scotland during the 1745 Rising. Over 240 members of the regiment were lost at Lauffeld in July 1747, a defeat that led to the Treaty of Aix-la-Chapelle.

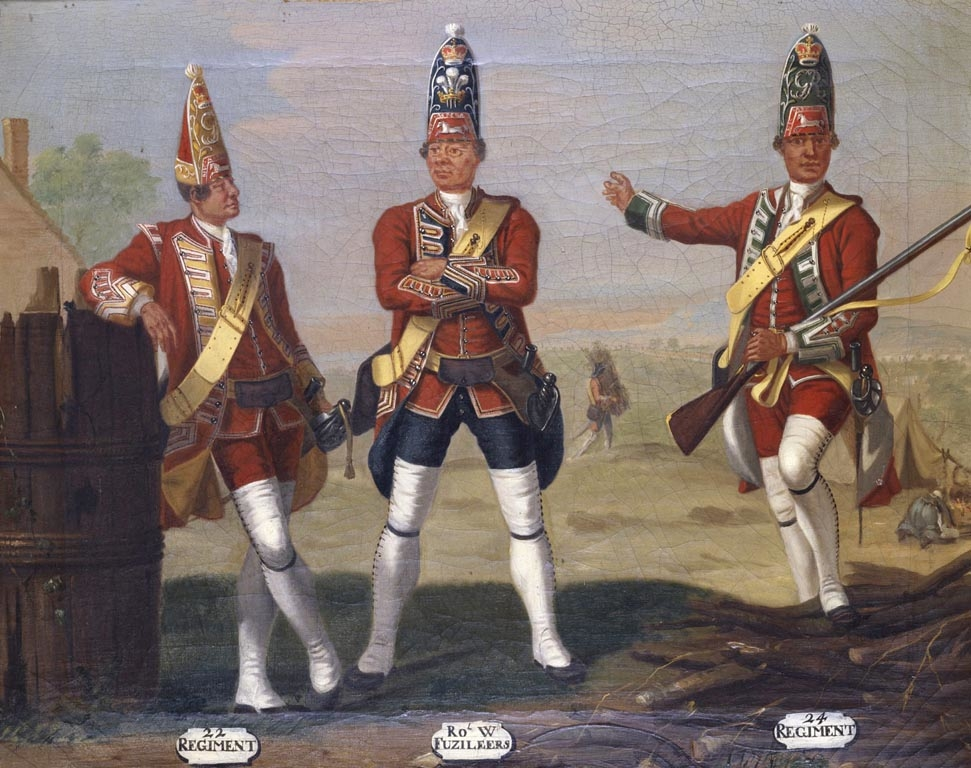
c. 1751 painting of a regimental grenadier (centre)

Following the 1751 reforms that standardised naming and numbering of regiments, it became the 23rd Regiment of Foot (Royal Welsh Fuzileers). In the opening battle of the Seven Years' War, it was part of the Minorca garrison that surrendered to the French in June 1756; given free passage to Gibraltar, from 1758 it campaigned in Germany. In the same year the 2nd Battalion was separated from the regiment and became the 68th Regiment of Foot.

At Minden in August 1759, it was one of the infantry units that routed the French cavalry, an achievement still celebrated as Minden Day by their successor unit, the Royal Welsh. Between 1760 and 1762, it fought in the battles of Warburg, Kloster Kampen 1760 and Wilhelmsthal in June 1762, before the war ended with the 1763 Treaty of Paris.

The regiment was posted to British North America in 1773 being stationed first in the Province of New York then moved to Boston where it took part in the first engagement of the American Revolutionary War at the Battles of Lexington and Concord in 1775. The light infantry and grenadier companies took heavy losses at the Battle of Bunker Hill in June 1775; it participated in nearly every campaign up to the Siege of Yorktown in September 1781. At Yorktown, it was the only British regiment not to surrender its colours, which were smuggled out by a junior officer.

In the early stages of the French Revolutionary Wars, it was posted to the West Indies in 1794 and participated in the 1795 capture of Port-au-Prince before returning home in 1796. As part of the expeditionary force assigned to the 1799 Anglo-Russian invasion of Holland, it fought at Alkmaar in October 1799.

=== 19th century ===
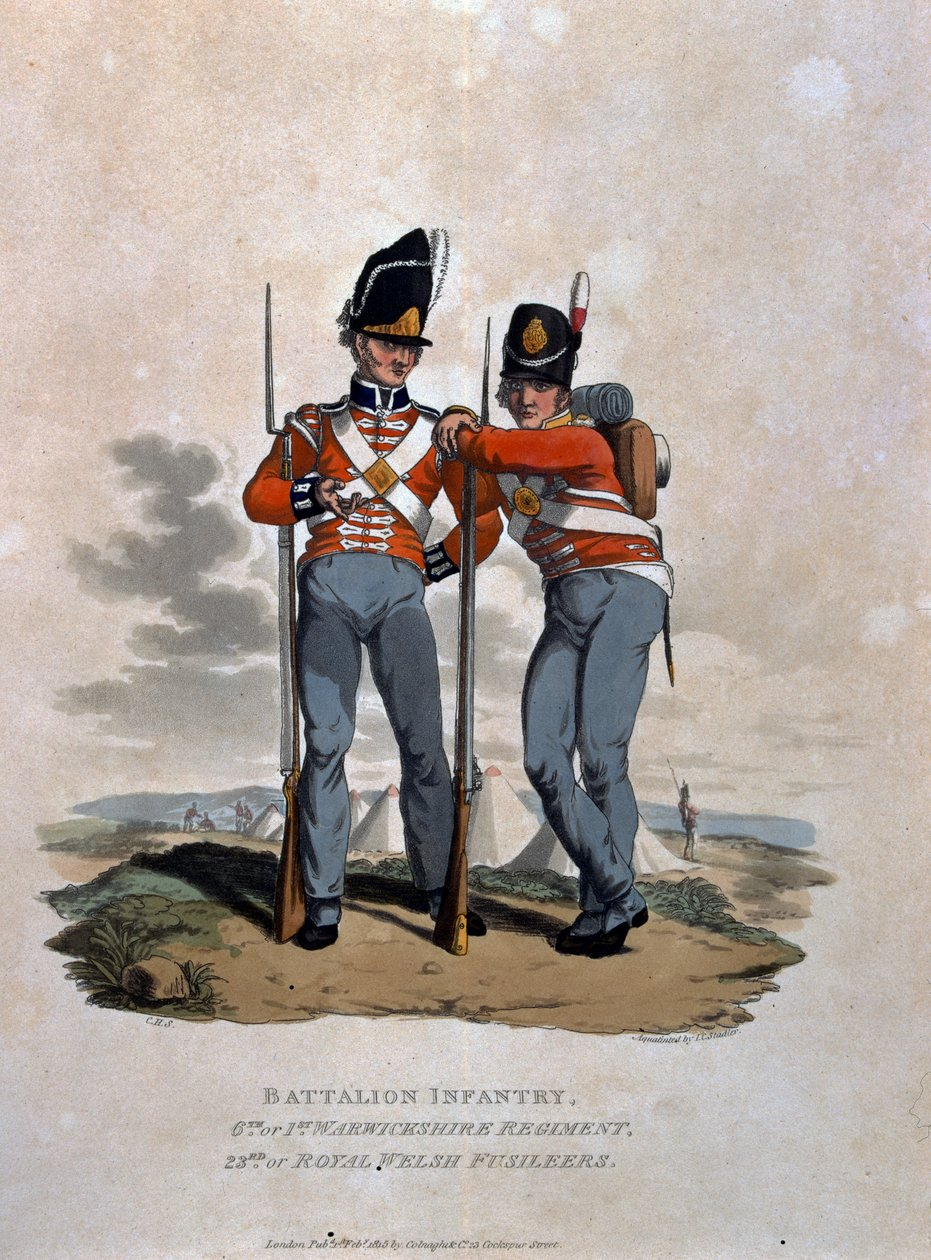
1815 engraving of a regimental private (right)

A regimental sergeant in 1830

Apart from Egypt and the Battle of Alexandria in 1801 and the Invasion of Martinique in 1809 the regiment saw little action in the Napoleonic Wars until being sent to the Peninsula in 1810. Between 1811 and 1814, it fought in many of Wellington's actions, including the battles of Albuera, Badajoz, Salamanca, Nivelle and Toulouse. At the Battle of Waterloo in June 1815, it was part of Lieutenant Colonel Hugh Mitchell's 4th Brigade in the 4th Infantry Division.

In the nineteenth century, the regiment took part in the Crimean War, the Second Opium War, the Indian Mutiny and the Third Anglo-Burmese War.

The Cardwell Reforms of 1872 linked most infantry regiments in pairs, but because the 23rd already had two battalions it was unaffected. Cardwell also introduced 'Localisation of the Forces', which established permanent regimental depots in county towns and brigaded the regular regiments with their local Militia and Volunteer battalions. For the 23rd, this included:

- 23rd Brigade Depot at Hightown Barracks in Wrexham from 1873
- Royal Anglesey Light Infantry – converted to Engineers in 1877
- Royal Flint Rifles
- Royal Denbigh and Merioneth Rifles
- Royal Carnarvon Rifles
- 1st Administrative Battalion, Denbighshire Rifle Volunteers
- 1st Administrative Battalion, Flintshire & Carnarvonshire Rifle Volunteers

The Childers Reforms of 1881 took Cardwell's reforms further. The regiments were given names rather than numbers the regiment officially became The Royal Welsh Fusiliers on 1 July 1881, although "Welch" was used informally until restored in 1920 by Army Order No.56. The depot became the 23rd Regimental District depot, and the militia and volunteers became numbered battalions of their linked regiment (though the Royal Flint Rifles joined the King's Royal Rifle Corps):

- 3rd (Royal Denbigh and Merioneth Militia) Battalion – 3rd (Royal Denbigh and Flint Militia) Battalion from 1889
- 4th (Royal Carnarvon Militia) Battalion – 4th (Royal Carnarvon and Merioneth Militia) Battalion from 1889
- 1st Volunteer Battalion, Royal Welch Fusiliers – from 1st Denbighshire Volunteers'
- 2nd Volunteer Battalion, Royal Welch Fusiliers – from 1st Flintshire & Carnarvon Volunteers'
- 3rd Volunteer Battalion, Royal Welch Fusiliers – formed in 1897 from the Carnarvonshire companies of the 2nd VB

The 1st battalion served in the 1899 to 1902 Second Boer War; and returned home from South Africa on the SS Ortona in January 1903.

The 2nd battalion was stationed at Hong Kong from 1898 to 1902, and served in the multinational force involved in the Boxer Rebellion in China in 1900. They fought alongside the United States Marine Corps (see pages 32–33 in official USMC paper published in 1995). They transferred to India in October 1902, and were stationed at Chakrata.

=== 20th century ===
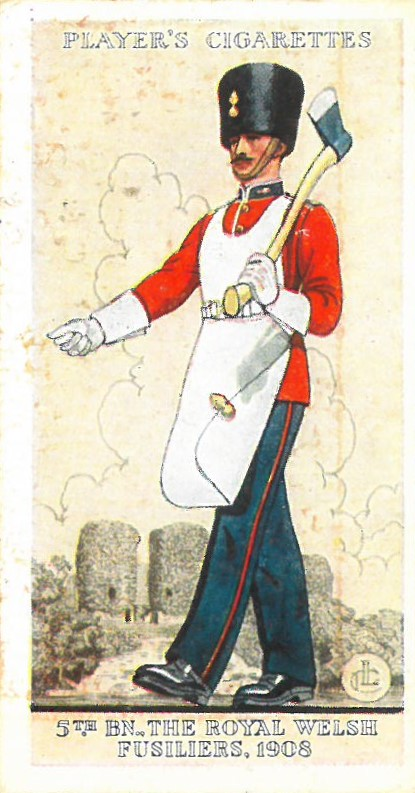
Cigarette card of a regimental pioneer in 1908

The Haldane Reforms of 1908 converted the remaining Militia into the Special Reserve (SR) and the Volunteers into the Territorial Force (TF). The battalions were now numbered sequentially within their regiment. The TF battalions of the RWF were given subtitles in 1909:

- 3rd (Reserve) Battalion (SR) at Poyser Street in Wrexham
- 4th (Denbighshire) Battalion (TF) at Poyser Street, Wrexham
- 5th (Flintshire) Battalion (TF) at Castle Precinct in Flint (since demolished)
- 6th (Carnarvonshire & Anglesey) Battalion (TF) at Caernarfon Barracks in Caernarfon
- 7th (Merionethshire and Montgomeryshire) Battalion (TF) at Back Lane Drill Hall in Newtown – transferred from the South Wales Borderers

The four TF Battalions constituted the North Wales Brigade in the Welsh Division.

==== First World War; Regular Army ====
The 1st and 2nd battalions served on the Western Front from 1914 to 1918 and took part in some of the hardest fighting of the war, including Mametz Wood in 1916 and Passchendaele or Third Ypres in 1917. Claims in 2008 they participated in the semi-mythical Christmas 1914 Football Game with the Germans have since been disproved.

A number of writers fought with the regiment in France and recorded their experiences; David Thomas (killed 1916), Robert Graves and Siegfried Sassoon all served with the 1st Battalion. John Bernard Pye Adams, a captain with the 1st Battalion, was wounded in 1916, and while on medical leave, wrote Nothing of Importance, his recollections of trench life. Adams did not live to see its publication — after returning to the front in January 1917, he died in action a month later. His book, published a few months after his death, was the only memoir of trench experiences published in Great Britain during the war and was well received by both The Times and the Daily Telegraph.

J C Dunn, a medical officer with the 2nd Battalion who had also served in the 1899–1902 Boer War, published The War the Infantry Knew in 1931. A collection of letters and diary entries from over 50 individuals, it is considered a classic by military historians for its treatment of daily life and death in the trenches.

Good-Bye to All That by Robert Graves was first published in 1929 and has never been out of print; in one anecdote, he records the Regimental Goat Major being charged with 'prostituting the Royal Goat' in return for a stud fee. Graves also edited Old Soldiers Never Die, published in 1933; a rare example of the war seen by an ordinary soldier, it was written by Frank Richards, a pre-war regular recalled in 1914, who served on the Western Front until the end of the war. The poets David Jones and Hedd Wyn, killed at Passchendaele in 1917, were members of Kitchener battalions.

==== First World War; Territorial and War Service ====
The TF battalions raised 2nd and 3rd Line battalions; in addition, the regiment raised over a dozen 'war service' battalions, informally known as Kitchener or Pals battalions.

The 4th (Denbighshire) Battalion was one of the first TF units to see active service, landing in France in November 1914, where it remained until January 1919. Between 1915 and 1918, another ten Royal Welch Kitchener battalions also fought on the Western Front, including the battles of Loos, the Somme and Passchendaele; a number of these were disbanded in early 1918 due to manpower shortages. The poets David Jones and Hedd Wyn served with The 11th (Service) Battalion landed in Salonika in November 1915, where it remained for the duration of the war.

The 5th, 6th, 7th Territorial battalions fought at Gallipoli as part of the 53rd (Welsh) Division; by January 1916, it contained 162 officers and 2,428 men, approximately 15% of full strength. The 8th Kitchener Battalion was also at Gallipoli as part of 13th (Western) Division. They remained in the Middle East until the end of the war, the 53rd (Welsh) taking part in the Sinai and Palestine Campaign and the 13th (Western) in the Mesopotamian campaign.

==== Interwar ====
The TF was reformed in 1920 and reorganised as the Territorial Army (TA) the following year. In 1938 the 5th (Flintshire) Battalion was converted into 60th (Royal Welch Fusiliers) Anti-Tank Regiment, Royal Artillery. Just before the outbreak of World War II the Territorial Army was doubled in size and the battalions created duplicates:

- 8th (Denbighshire) Battalion – from the 4th Bn
- 9th (Caernarvonshire & Anglesey) Battalion – from the 6th Bn
- 10th (Merionethshire & Montgomeryshire) Battalion – from the 7th Bn
- 70th Anti-Tank Regiment – from the 60th Rgt; granted Royal Welch Fusiliers subtitle in 1942)

==== Second World War; Regular Army ====
The regiment was awarded 27 battle honours for World War II, with more than 1,200 fusiliers killed in action or died of wounds.

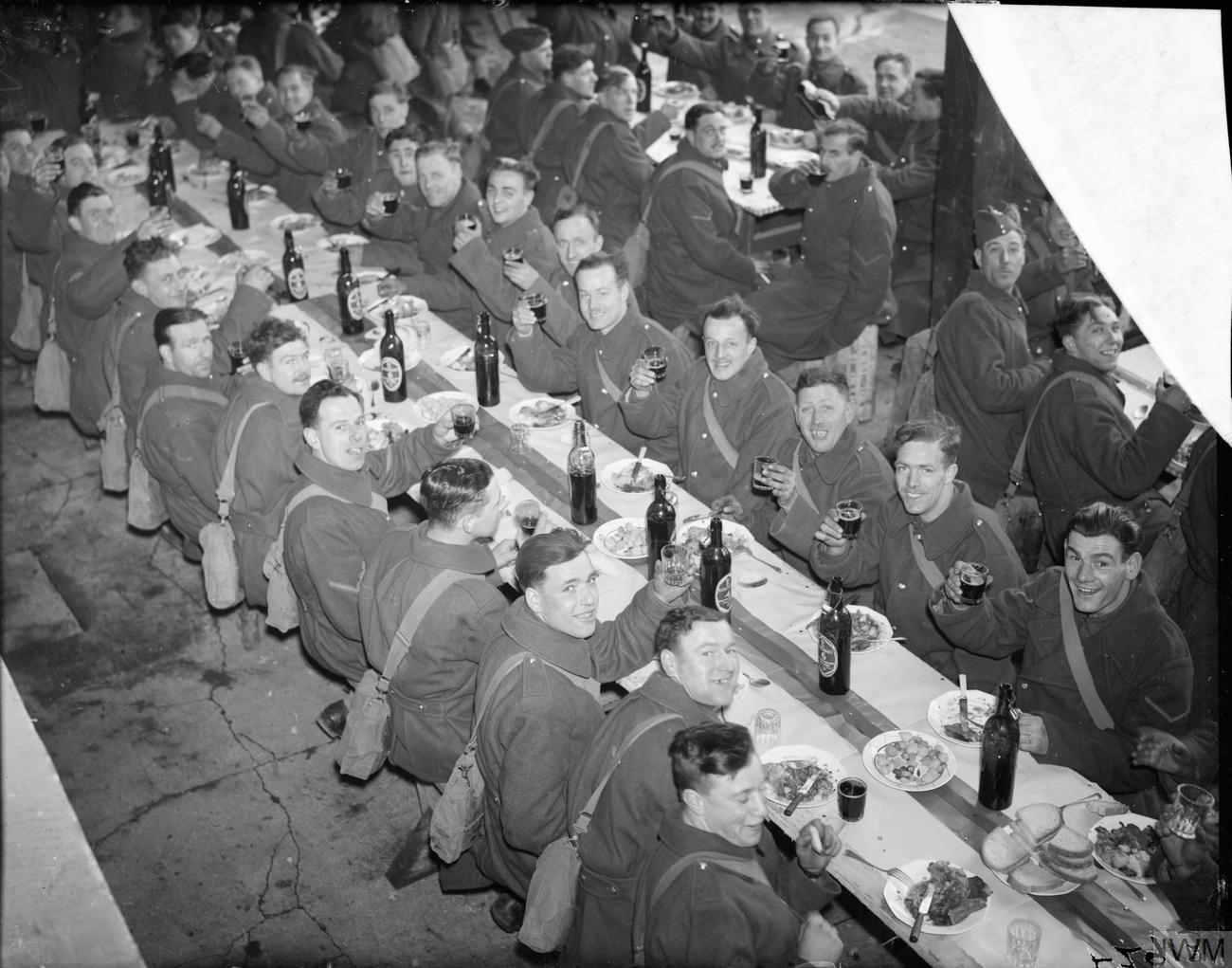
Men of the 1st Battalion, Royal Welch Fusiliers celebrate St David's Day, 1 March 1940

During the Second World War, the 1st Battalion, Royal Welch Fusiliers was a Regular Army unit and part of the 6th Infantry Brigade, assigned to the 2nd Infantry Division. It served in France in 1940 with the British Expeditionary Force. The battalion fought in the short but fierce battles of France and Belgium and was forced to retreat and be evacuated during the Dunkirk evacuation. After two years spent in the United Kingdom, waiting and preparing for the invasion that never came (Operation Sea Lion), the 1st RWF and the rest of 2nd Division were sent to British India to fight the Imperial Japanese Army after a string of defeats inflicted upon the British and Indian troops. The battalion was involved in the Burma Campaign, particularly the Battle of Kohima, nicknamed Stalingrad of the East due to the ferocity of fighting on both sides, that helped to turn the tide of the campaign in the South East Asian theatre.

The 2nd Battalion was part of 29th Independent Infantry Brigade throughout the war. In 1942, it fought in the Battle of Madagascar, then part of Vichy French, before being transferred to the South-East Asian Theatre. In 1944, the battalion and brigade became part of 36th British Infantry Division, previously an Indian Army formation.

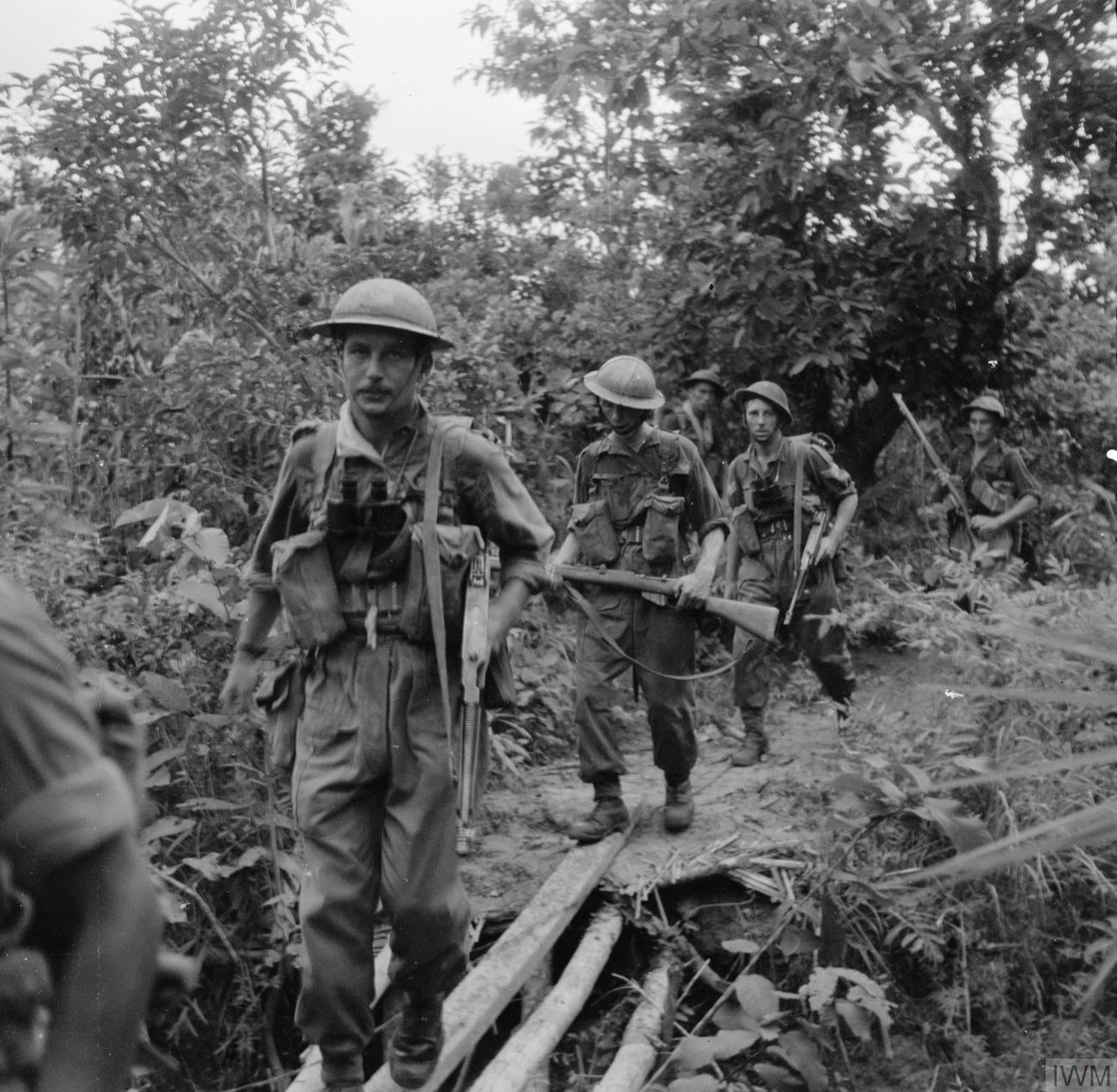
Royal Welsh Fusiliers move forward on a jungle path near Pinbaw, Burma, December 1944

Both battalions came under the command of Lieutenant-General Bill Slim, commander of the British Fourteenth Army. This was known as the 'Forgotten Fourteenth,' allegedly because it fought in a theatre that seemed largely unnoticed and had little importance to the war.

==== Second World War; Territorial and War Service ====
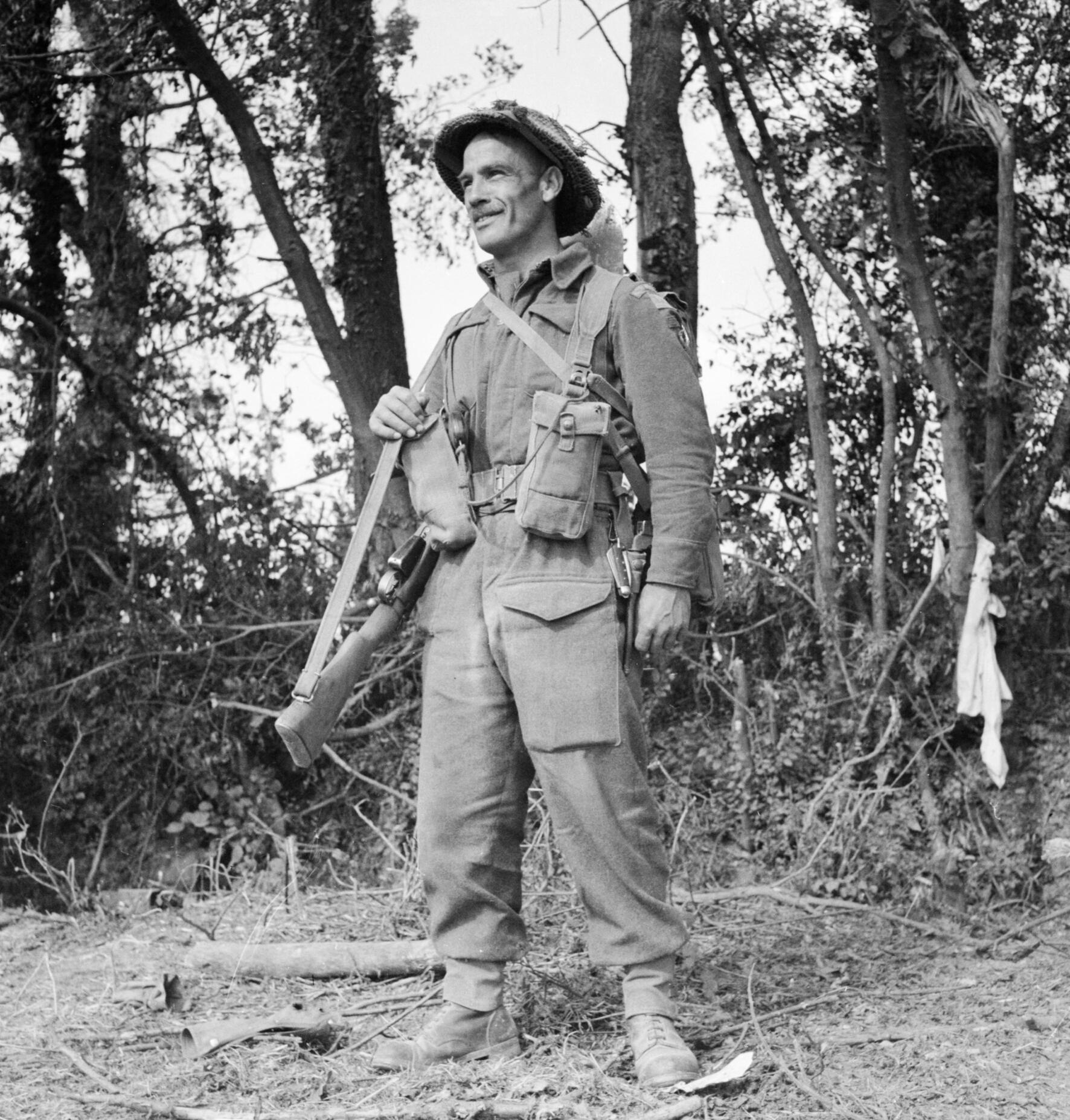
Fusilier Tom Payne of 11 Platoon, 'B' Company, 6th Battalion, Royal Welch Fusiliers, Normandy, 12 August 1944

The 4th, 6th and 7th Battalions, all Territorial units, served in 158th (Royal Welch) Brigade assigned to the 53rd (Welsh) Infantry Division. They took part in the Battle of Normandy at Hill 112, where the 53rd Division suffered heavy casualties. Due to heavy fighting and casualties in Normandy, some of the battalions were posted to different brigades within the division. The 53rd again suffered heavily during Operation Veritable (the Battle of the Reichswald) under command of the First Canadian Army, in which action the British and Canadians, and the 53rd Division in particular, endured some of the fiercest fighting of the entire European Campaign against German paratroops.

The 8th, 9th and 10th Battalions were 2nd Line Territorial battalions raised in 1939 as duplicates of the 4th, 6th and 7th Battalions respectively. The battalions initially served in the 115th (Royal Welch Fusiliers) Brigade, 38th (Welsh) Division, itself a 2nd Line duplicate of the 53rd (Welsh) Division.

The 8th and 9th battalions never saw action abroad, remaining in the UK throughout the war in a training role, supplying trained replacements to units overseas. In this capacity, the 9th battalion served with the 80th Infantry (Reserve) Division and the 38th Infantry (Reserve) Division.

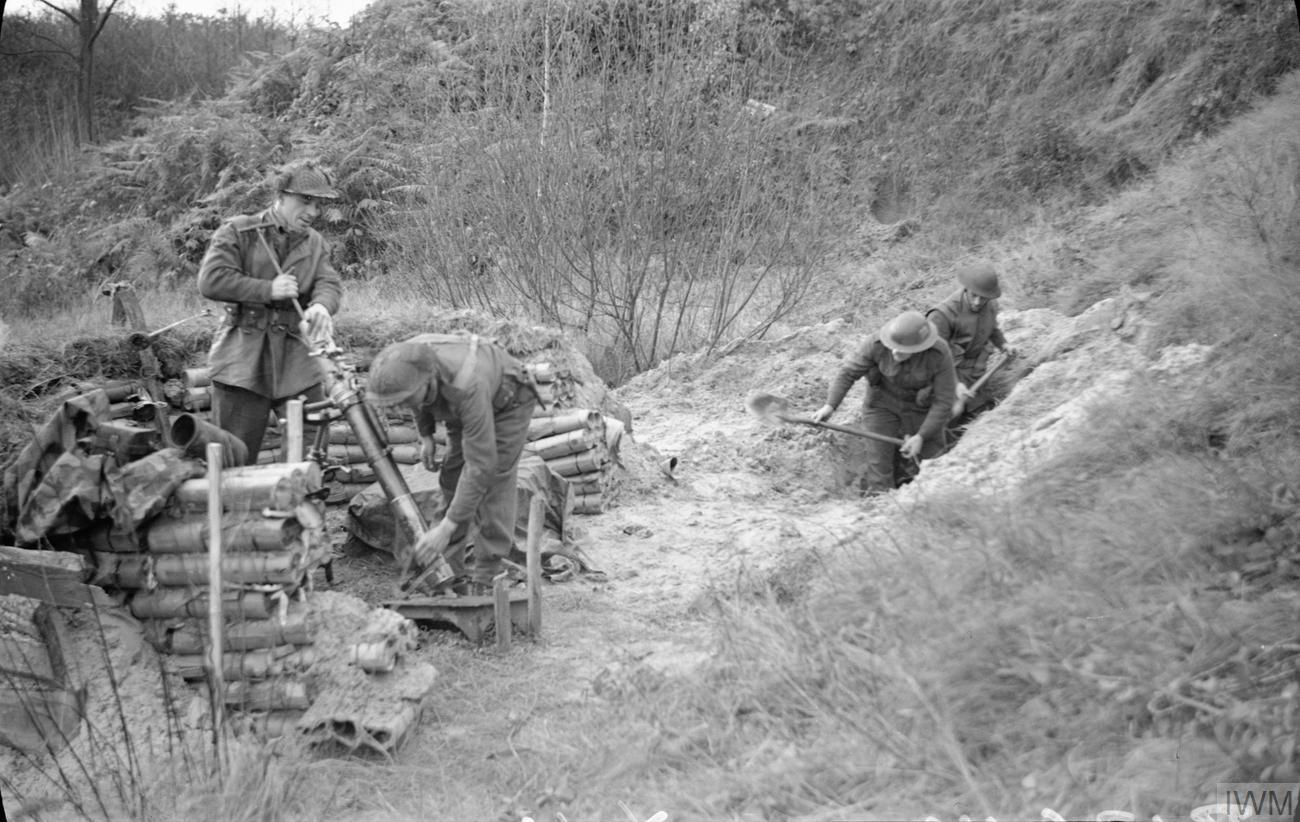
3-inch mortar of the 7th Battalion, Royal Welsh Fusiliers, 8 December 1944

In the summer of 1942, the 10th battalion was converted into the 6th (Royal Welch) Battalion, Parachute Regiment. The 6th Parachute Battalion was assigned to the 2nd Parachute Brigade, alongside the 4th and 5th Parachute battalions, originally part of the 1st Airborne Division. The battalion played a small part in the Allied invasion of Italy during Operation Slapstick, an amphibious landing aimed at capturing the port of Taranto. After that, the 2nd Para Brigade became an independent brigade group. The brigade took part in Operation Dragoon, the Allied invasion of Southern France, being the only British troops to do so (see 2nd Parachute Brigade in Southern France). In late 1944, the brigade was sent to Greece to support pro-Western forces in the Greek Civil War, a forgotten but brutal episode now seen as the first act of the post-1945 Cold War.

In 1938, the 5th Battalion transferred to the Royal Artillery as 60th Anti-Tank Regiment and in 1939, added a 2nd-Line duplicate, 70th Anti-Tank Regiment. Unlike 1914–1918, there were relatively few service battalions, one being 11th (Home Defence) Battalion, raised in 1939 as part of the Home Guard. Formed in 1940, the 12th battalion became 116th Light Anti-Aircraft Regiment, Royal Artillery in January 1942 and served with 53rd (Welsh) Division until disbanded in December 1944.

=== Post Second World War ===
The 2nd Battalion Royal Welch remained overseas after the Second World War, with a posting to Burma (still a colony until 4 January 1948) and performed internal security duties. On 7 March 1947 a party aboard a train were ambushed by bandits and seven soldiers were killed.

The regiment did not take part in the Gulf War, but did perform several tours in Northern Ireland (Operation Banner) before being deployed to the Balkans.

During the Yugoslav Wars, the regiment came to attention when 33 of their men and 350 other UN servicemen part of UNPROFOR were taken hostage by Bosnian Serbs at Goražde on 28 May 1995. The situation caused some political debate as the UN troops had been given orders only to "deter attacks" and did not have a mandate or adequate equipment to fully defend the mainly Muslim town of Goražde, which was initially declared "safe" by the UN, thus rendering them exposed when armed members of the Army of Republika Srpska (Bosnian Serb Army) ignored the NATO ultimatum and attacked the town without warning. The regiment managed to hold off the Bosnian Serbs until they were forced to retreat into bunkers – those who did not make it quickly enough were taken hostage – and remained trapped underground while BiH Army reinforcements arrived and fought back. The commanding officer, Lt Col Jonathon Riley (later promoted to Lieutenant General), broke with protocol and directly reported to then Prime Minister John Major about the situation over the phone while in the bunker. All the men were eventually safely rescued. An unprecedented five gallantry awards, seven mentions in despatches and two Queen's Commendations for Valuable Service were awarded to the regiment. Although the incident was largely unreported at that time, the regiment was credited in hindsight by observers for saving the town from a possible genocide—after failing to take Goražde, the Bosnian Serbs continued north to Srebrenica, where they would massacre over 8,000 Bosniaks.

=== Amalgamation ===
It was one of only five line infantry regiments never to have been amalgamated in its entire history, the others being The Royal Scots, The Green Howards, The Cheshire Regiment, and The King's Own Scottish Borderers. However, in 2004, it was announced that, as part of the restructuring of the infantry, the Royal Welch Fusiliers would merge with the Royal Regiment of Wales to form a new large regiment, the Royal Welsh.

To honour the links between the regiment and the United States Marine Corps on the 16 September 1945 a set of Marine colours were presented to the regiment at the parish church in Wrexham to commemorate their close connection (see page 32 in official USMC paper published in 1995).

The regiment has a chapel within St Giles Parish Church Wrexham containing their colours and other items. There is an image available taken in 2013.

== Regimental museum ==
The Royal Welch Fusiliers Museum is located in Caernarfon, Wales.

== Battle honours ==
The regiment was awarded the following battle honours:

- Namur 1695, Blenheim, Ramillies, Oudenarde, Malplaquet, Dettingen, Minden, Egypt
- Peninsular War: Corunna, Martinique 1809, Albuhera, Badajoz, Salamanca, Vittoria, Pyrenees, Nivelle, Orthes, Toulouse, Peninsula
- Napoleonic War: Waterloo
- Crimean War: Alma, Inkerman, Sevastopol
- Lucknow, Ashantee 1873–1874, Burma 1885–1887, Relief of Ladysmith, South Africa 1899–1902, Pekin 1900
- First World War: Mons, Le Cateau, Retreat from Mons, Marne 1914, Aisne 1914 '18, La Bassée 1914, Messines 1914 '17 '18, Armentières 1914, Ypres 1914 '17 '18, Langemarck 1914 '17, Gheluvelt, Givenchy 1914, Neuve Chapelle, Aubers, Festubert 1915, Loos, Somme 1916 '18, Albert 1916 '18, Bazentin, Delville Wood, Pozières, Guillemont, Flers-Courcelette, Morval, Le Transloy, Ancre Heights, Ancre 1916 '18, Arras 1917, Scarpe 1917, Arleux, Bullecourt, Pilckem, Menin Road, Polygon Wood, Broodseinde, Poelcappelle, Passchendaele, Cambrai 1917 '18, St. Quentin, Bapaume 1918, Lys, Bailleul, Kemmel, Scherpenberg, Hindenburg Line, Havrincourt, Épéhy, St. Quentin Canal, Beaurevoir, Selle, Valenciennes, Sambre, France and Flanders 1914–1918, Piave, Vittorio Veneto, Italy 1917–1918, Doiran 1917 '18, Macedonia 1915–1918, Suvla, Sari Bair, Landing at Suvla, Scimitar Hill, Gallipoli 1915–1916, Rumani, Egypt 1915–1917, Gaza, El Mughar, Jerusalem, Jericho, Tell 'Asur, Megiddo, Nablus, Palestine 1917–1918, Tigris 1916, Kut al Amara 1917, Baghdad, Mesopotamia 1916–1918
- Second World War: Dyle, Defence of Escaut, St. Omer-La Bassée, Caen, Esquay, Falaise, Nederrijn, Lower Maas, Venlo Pocket, Ourthe, Rhineland, Reichswald, Goch, Weeze, Rhine, Ibbenburen, Aller, North-West Europe 1940 '44–45, Madagascar, Middle East 1942, Donbaik, North Arakan, Kohima, Mandalay, Ava, Burma 1943–1945

== Victoria Crosses ==
The following members of the regiment were awarded the Victoria Cross:

- Captain Edward William Derrington Bell, Crimean War (20 September 1854)
- Lieutenant Thomas Bernard Hackett, Indian Rebellion of 1857 (18 November 1857)
- Company Sergeant Major Frederick Barter, First World War (16 May 1915)
- Corporal John Collins, First World War (31 October 1917)
- Corporal James Llewellyn Davies, First World War (31 July 1917)
- Corporal Joseph John Davies, First World War (20 July 1916)
- Lt-Colonel Charles Doughty-Wylie, First World War (26 April 1915)
- Private Albert Hill, First World War (20 July 1916)
- Colour-Sergeant Luke O'Connor, Crimean War (20 September 1854)
- Lance-Sergeant William Herbert Waring, First World War (18 September 1918)
- Lance-Corporal Henry Weale, First World War (26 August 1918)

== Colonels-in-Chief ==
The Colonels-in-Chief of the Regiment were:

- 1901: King George V
- 1936: King George VI
- 1953: Queen Elizabeth II

== Regimental Colonels ==
The Colonels of the Regiment were:

- 1689: Col. Henry Herbert, 4th Baron Herbert of Chirbury
- 1689–1691: Col. Charles Herbert
- 1691–1692: Col. Toby Purcell
- 1692–1693: Col. Sir John Morgan, 2nd Baronet
- 1693–1705: Lt-Gen. Richard Ingoldsby

The Royal Regiment of Welch Fuzileers (1723)

- 1705–1739: Gen. Joseph Sabine
- 1739–1743: Col. Newsham Peers
- 1743–1761: Gen. John Huske
- 1761–1775: Lt-Gen. Hon George Boscawen
- 1775–1786: Gen. Sir William Howe, 5th Viscount Howe, KB
- 1786–1823: Gen. Richard Grenville
- 1823–1851: Gen. Sir James Willoughby Gordon, Bt., GCB, GCH
- 1851–1855: Lt-Gen. Sir George Charles D'Aguilar, KCB
- 1855–1860: Lt-Gen. Henry Rainey, CB, KH
- 1860–1875: Gen. Sir William Codrington, GCB
- 1875–1898: Gen. Charles Crutchley

The Royal Welsh Fusiliers (1881)

- 1898–1910: Gen. Sir Edward Earle Gascoigne Bulwer, GCB
- 1910–1914: Maj-Gen. Hon. Sir Savage Lloyd Mostyn, KCB
- 1914–1915: Maj-Gen. Sir Luke O'Connor, VC, KCB

The Royal Welch Fusiliers (1921)

- 1915–1926: Lt-Gen. Sir Francis Lloyd, GCVO, KCB, DSO
- 1926–1938: Lt-Gen. Sir Charles Macpherson Dobell, KCB, CMG, DSO
- 1938–1942: Maj-Gen. John Randle Minshull-Ford, CB, DSO, MC
- 1942–1947: Maj-Gen. Nigel Maitland Wilson, CB, DSO, OBE
- 1947–1948: Brig. Llewellyn Augustus Arthur Alston, CBE, DSO, MC
- 1948–1952: Brig. Sir Eric Ommanney Skaife, CB, OBE
- 1952–1965: Maj-Gen. Sir Hugh Charles Stockwell, KBE, CB, DSO
- 1965–1974: Col. John Edward Theodore Willes, MBE
- 1974–1984: Maj-Gen. Peter Raymond Leuchars, CBE
- 1984–1990: Brig. Anthony Chester Vivian, CBE
- 1990–1997: Maj-Gen. Richard Morgan Llewellyn, CB, OBE
- 1997–2001: Brig. David John Ross, CBE
- 2001–2005: Maj-Gen. Brian Peter Plummer, CBE
- 2005–2006: Maj-Gen. Jonathon Peter Riley, DSO
- 2006: Regiment amalgamated with The Royal Regiment of Wales to form The Royal Welsh

== Alliances ==
The regiment had an alliance with the Canadian Royal 22e Régiment from 1927 until its amalgamation in 2006; this alliance included the frequent exchange of personnel between the two regiments.

== Regimental mascot ==
As with the Royal Regiment of Wales, the regiment traditionally had a goat, never called a mascot. The tradition dated back to at least 1775, and possibly to the regiment's formation. The goat was always named 'Billy'.

== Uniform ==
Soldiers of this regiment were distinguishable by the unique feature of the "flash", consisting of five overlapping black silk ribbons (seven inches long for soldiers and nine inches long for officers) on the back of the uniform jacket at neck level. This is a legacy of the days when it was normal for soldiers to wear pigtails. In 1808, this practice was discontinued but when the order was issued the RWF were serving in Nova Scotia and had not received the instruction when the regiment departed to join an expedition to the West Indies. In 1834 the officers of the 23rd Foot were finally granted permission by William IV to wear this non-regulation item as a distinction on the full dress uniform as "a peculiarity whereby to mark the dress of that distinguished regiment". This was extended to all ranks in 1900.

Khaki service dress replaced the scarlet tunic as the principal uniform, and the Army Council attempted to remove the flash during the First World War, citing the grounds that it would help the Germans identify which unit was facing them. As Fusilier officer Robert Graves reported, "the regiment retorted by inquiring on what occasion since the retreat from Corunna, when the regiment was the last to leave Spain, with the keys of the town postern in the pocket of one of its officers, had any of His Majesty's enemies seen the back of a Royal Welch Fusilier?," and the matter remained "in abeyance throughout the war." The efforts of the regiment to retain the distinction was further reinforced at a medal ceremony when King George V saw an officer of the regiment in the line. He ordered an About Turn and seeing the flash still on the tunic said sotto voce, "don't ever let anyone take it from you!" The wearing of the flash on service dress was extended to other ranks in 1924.

As a fusilier regiment, the RWF wore a hackle, which consisted of a plume of white feathers mounted behind the cap-badge of the modern beret. The full dress of the Royal Welch Fusiliers, as worn by the entire regiment until 1914, included a racoon-skin hat (bearskin for officers) with a white hackle and a scarlet tunic with the dark blue facings of a Royal regiment. This uniform continued to be worn by the RWF's Corps of Drums and the Regimental Pioneers until the merger of 2006.

== Regimental Prayer ==
The Regimental Collect (or prayer as it is also known as) was in Welsh:

Tragwyddol Dduw, a gyfododd trwy dy nerth yr Arglwydd Iesu Grist o'r meirw, gynnal fe weddiwn, gwrhydri hynafol y Ffiwsilwyr Cymreig, fel yr oddefwn galedi yn ôl ei esiampl, ac y cyfodwn gydag ef i lewyrch fel yr hal yn dy deyrnas, trwy'r un Iesu Grist ein Harglwydd. Amen.

And in English:

Eternal God, whose strength raised up our Lord Jesus Christ from the dead, uphold, we pray thee, the ancient valour of the Royal Welch Fusiliers, that we may ever endure hardship after his example, and may rise with him to shine as the sun in thy Kingdom, through the same Jesus Christ our Lord. Amen.

== See also ==
- Royal Welch Fusiliers Museum
- List of British Army regiments and corps

== Bibliography ==
- Barclay, C. N. (1956). The History of the 53rd (Welsh) Division in the Second World War. London: Wm. Clowes & Sons. OCLC 36762829.
- Maj A.F. Becke,History of the Great War: Order of Battle of Divisions, Part 2a: The Territorial Force Mounted Divisions and the 1st-Line Territorial Force Divisions (42–56), London: HM Stationery Office, 1935/Uckfield: Naval & Military Press, 2007, ISBN 1-847347-39-8.
- Cannon, Richard (1850). Historical Record of the Twenty-third, or the Royal Welch Fusiliers. London: Parker, Furnivall and Parker. ISBN 9780665483523.
- Cole, Howard N (1963). On Wings of Healing: The Story of the Airborne Medical Services 1940–1960. Edinburgh, United Kingdom: William Blackwood. OCLC 29847628.
- Col John K. Dunlop, The Development of the British Army 1899–1914, London: Methuen, 1938.
- J.B.M. Frederick, Lineage Book of British Land Forces 1660–1978, Vol I, Wakefield: Microform Academic, 1984, ISBN 1-85117-007-3.
- J.B.M. Frederick, Lineage Book of British Land Forces 1660–1978, Vol II, Wakefield: Microform Academic, 1984, ISBN 1-85117-009-X.
- Harclerode, Peter (2005). Wings Of War – Airborne Warfare 1918–1945. London: Weidenfeld & Nicolson. ISBN 978-0-304-36730-6.
- Horn, Bernd; Wyczynski, Michel (2003). Paras versus the Reich: Canada's paratroopers at war, 1942-45. Toronto, Canada: Dundurn Press Ltd. ISBN 978-1-55002-470-8.
- Joslen, H. F. (2003) [1960]. Orders of Battle: Second World War, 1939–1945. Uckfield, East Sussex: Naval and Military Press. ISBN 978-1-84342-474-1.
- Edward M. Spiers, The Army and Society 1815–1914, London: Longmans, 1980, ISBN 0-582-48565-7.
- Mark Urban, Fusiliers: Eight Years with the Redcoats in America, London: Faber & Faber, 2007, ISBN 978-0-571-22486-9
- Ray Westlake, Tracing the Rifle Volunteers, Barnsley: Pen and Sword, 2010, ISBN 978-1-84884-211-3.
- Westlake, Ray (2002). English and Welsh Infantry Regiments: An Illustrated Record of Service. Staplehurst. Spellmount. ISBN 978-1-86227-147-0.
