= Luke O'Connor =

British Army officer

Major-General Sir Luke O'Connor VC KCB
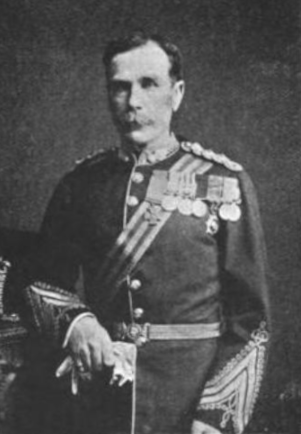
- Born: 20 January 1831; Hillstreet Aughrim, County Roscommon, Ireland
- Died: 1 February 1915 (aged 84); Clarges Street, London, England
- Burial place: St Mary's Catholic Cemetery, Kensal Green, London
- Military career
- Allegiance: United Kingdom
- Branch: British Army
- Service years: 1849–1887
- Rank: Major-General
- Units: 23rd Regiment of Foot
- Conflicts: Crimean War; Indian Mutiny; Third Anglo-Ashanti War
- Awards: Victoria Cross; Knight Commander of the Order of the Bath; Order of the Medjidie (Ottoman Empire); Medal of Military Valor (Sardinia)

Major-General Sir Luke O'Connor, VC, KCB (20 January 1831 – 1 February 1915) was a British Army officer. He was the first person to receive the Victoria Cross, Britain's highest award for gallantry in the face of the enemy.

== Background ==
Luke O'Connor was born in Kilcroy, Hillstreet, in the parish of Aughrim, Co Roscommon in Ireland. He was born to James O'Connor (born 1800) and Mary Gannon. He and his family were evicted from their farm because they were unable to pay the rent and decided to move to North America in 1839 in search of opportunity. His father James died at sea en route and his mother and a baby brother died at Grosse Isle, Quebec on arrival of cholera. Although Luke returned to Ireland as a boy, some of his other siblings remained in North America and fought in the American Civil War.

== Military career ==
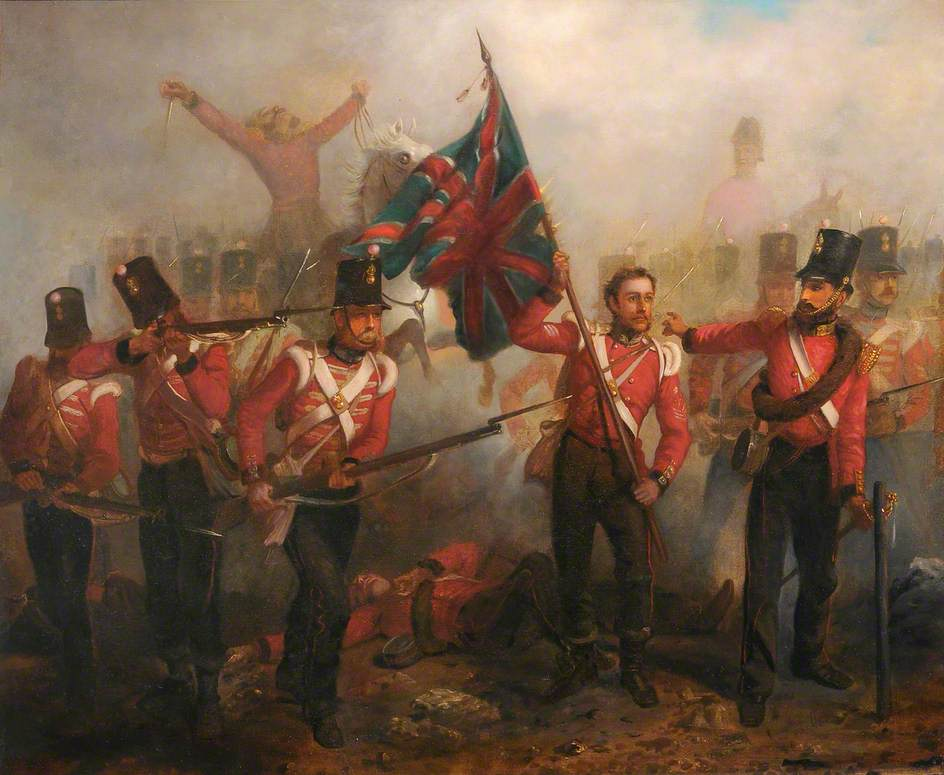
Sergeant Luke O'Connor Winning the Victoria Cross at the Battle of Alma (1854). Oil by Louis William Desanges.

He enlisted in the British Army as a young man. At the age of 23, he was a sergeant in the 23rd Regiment of Foot (later The Royal Welch Fusiliers). During the Crimean War, the 23rd Foot were part of the British force sent to the Crimea. On 20 September 1854, at the Battle of the Alma, Sergeant O'Connor was advancing between two officers, carrying the Colour, when one of them was mortally wounded. Sergeant O'Connor was also shot at the same time, but recovering himself, he snatched up the Colour from the ground and continued to carry it until the end of the action, although urged to retire to the rear on account of his wounds. He also acted with great gallantry at the assault on the Redan (8 September 1855) where he was shot through both thighs.

The Victoria Cross did not exist at that time, but when it was created in 1856 O'Connor was one of the 62 Crimean veterans invested by Queen Victoria at Hyde Park on 26 June 1857.

In June 1906 he was made a Companion of the Order of the Bath (CB) in the 1906 Birthday Honours. He later achieved the rank of major general and was appointed colonel of his old regiment on 3 June 1914. His VC is displayed at the Royal Welch Fusiliers Museum in Caernarfon Castle, Gwynedd, Wales.

== Death ==
He died in Clarges Street, London, on 1 February 1915. He is buried at St Mary's Catholic Cemetery, Kensal Green, London.

== See also ==
- Irish in the British Armed Forces
