= Louis William Desanges =

English painter

Louis William Desanges (1822 – 2 October 1905) was an English artist of French descent known for his paintings of Victoria Cross winners.

== Life ==
Born in Bexley, Kent, he was the great grandson of a French nobleman who had settled in England 80 years before and, as a consequence, the artist used the title 'Chevalier'. He travelled in France and Italy before settling in London in 1845; he later travelled to India. At first his pictures were of an historical nature, but he turned more to portrait painting as it was more lucrative.

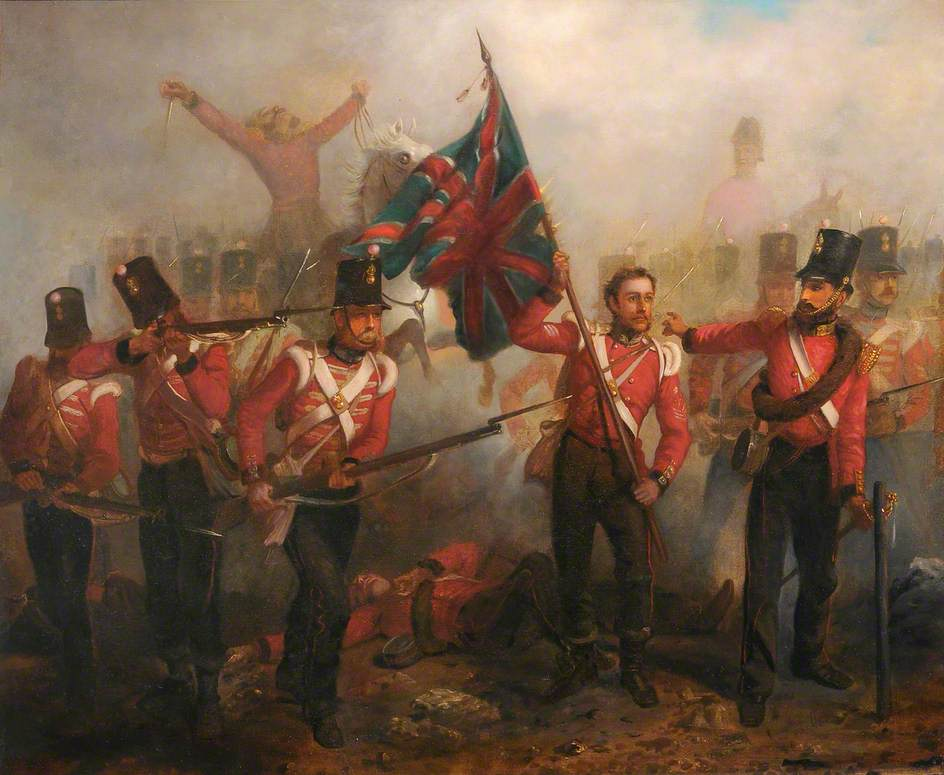
"Sergeant Luke O'Connor Winning the Victoria Cross at the Battle of Alma."

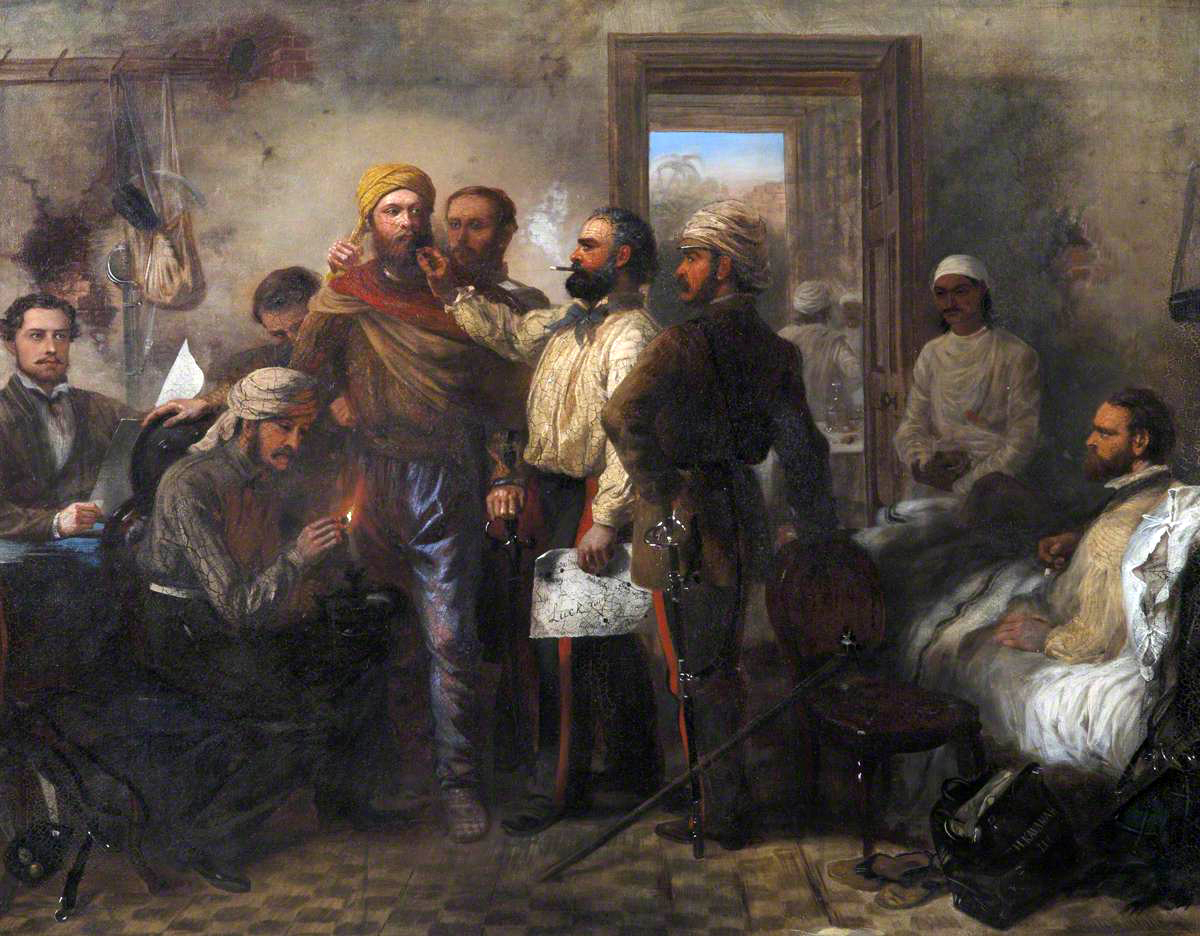
"Thomas Henry Kavanagh being disguised as a sepoy during the Siege of Lucknow."

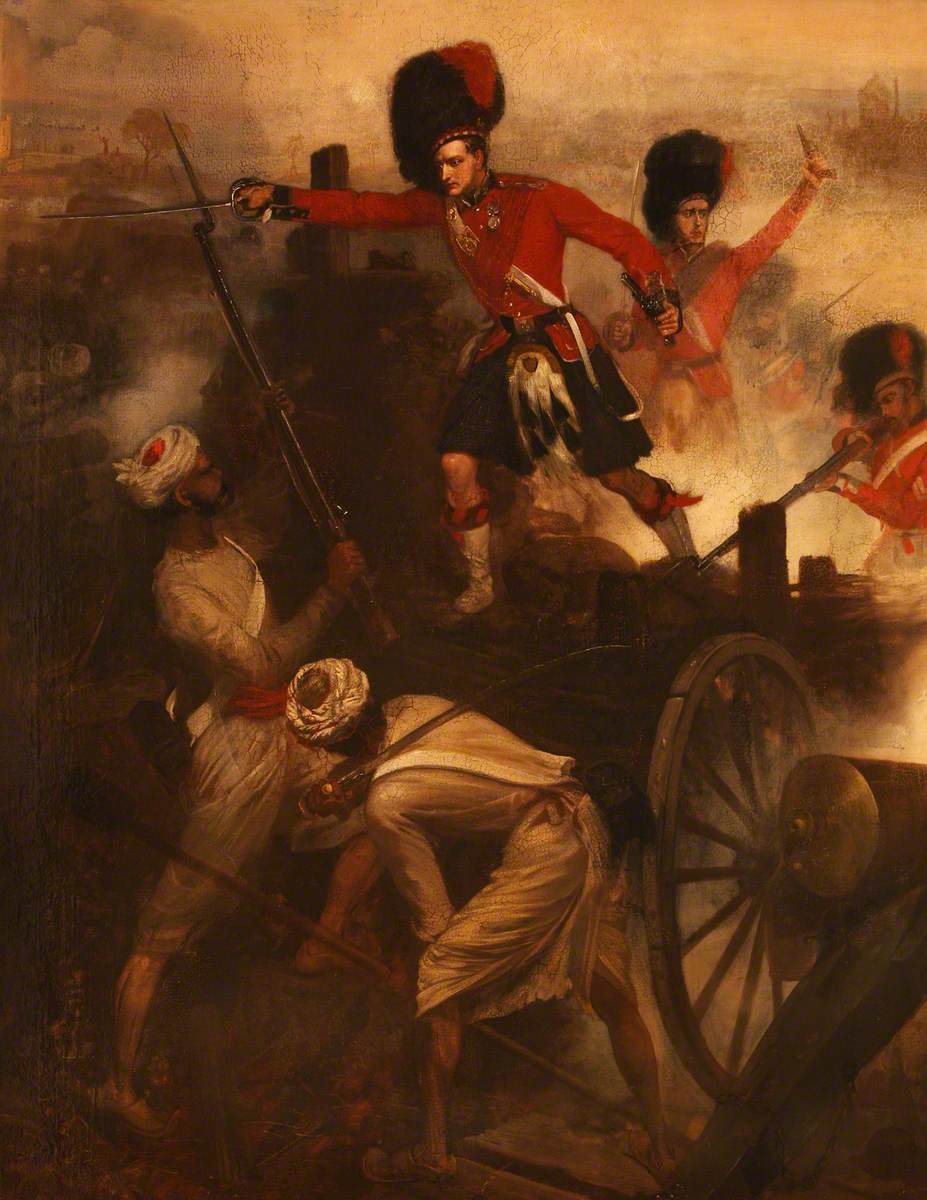
Lt Francis Farquharson winning his Victoria Cross at the Battle of Lucknow, 1858 by Louis William Desanges

While painting a portrait of Lieut. Col. Robert Lindsay (created Baron Wantage in 1885) who had won the Victoria Cross at the Battle of the Alma at his home in Wantage, the two men came up with idea of creating a series of paintings containing portraits of the various soldiers winning their V.C. medals. Many of these were exhibited at the Egyptian Gallery in Piccadilly, and 47 of the paintings were exhibited at the Crystal Palace at Sydenham in 1862. In 1900, the majority of them were acquired by Lord Wantage and hung in the Victoria Cross Gallery. In all, fifty oil paintings were painted by the artist between 1859 and 1862. The gallery was broken up in the 20th century and the paintings dispersed to various collections, particularly to the regiments represented. Desanges also painted several other military scenes, including a depiction of General Sir Garnet Wolseley during the Ashanti War entitled Fighting in the Ashantee Forest. This had been commissioned by the proprietors of the Illustrated London News and exhibited at Willis's Rooms in London in 1874, and was reproduced as a special supplement wood-engraving in the Illustrated London News on 1 August 1874. The artist composed his picture using sketches provided by Melton Prior, and various officers sat for him. Another military painting by Desanges depicted the March of General Roberts from Cabul to Candahar which was exhibited at the Jennings Gallery, Cheapside, in the spring of 1883. The picture was literally crammed with portraits of many of the participants.

Desanges also exhibited works at the Royal Academy between 1846 and 1887, many of which were portraits, but in 1862, he showed a large battle scene of Battle of Inkermann (now destroyed).

Sources give conflicting and erroneous dates for his death. In fact, the abstract of his will shows that he died on 2 October 1905 at Vine House, West Drayton, Middlesex. He left an estate valued at £2,399.

== Victoria Cross paintings ==
=== Crimean War ===
- Captain Robert James Lindsay, Scots Fusiliers Guards, winning the VC at the Alma, 20 September 1854 (Wantage Civic Hall)
- Lieut.-Col. E. W. D. Bell, 23rd Regiment, at the Battle of the Alma, 20 September 1854 (Royal Welch Fusiliers Museum, Caernarvon Castle)
- Sergeant Luke O'Connor, 23rd Royal Welsh Fusiliers, although shot in the breast, bravely carries forward one of the Colours at the Alma, 20 September 1854 (Royal Welch Fusiliers Museum, Caernarvon Castle)
- Private Samuel Parkes, 4th Light Dragoons, winning the V.C. at Balaclava, 25 October 1854 (Queen's Royal Hussars)
- Commander W. N. Hewett, R.N., repelling a sortie of Russians from Sebastopol, 26 October 1854 (location unknown)
- Major G. L. Goodlake, Coldstream Guards, defending the Windmill Ravine before Sebastopol, 26 October 1854 (Coldstream Guards?)
- Surgeon James Mouat assisted by Sergeant-Major Wooden, 26 October 1854 Queen's Royal Lancers
- Private Anthony Palmer, Grenadier Guards, charging singly upon the enemy at Inkermann, 5 November 1854 (Grenadier Guards)
- Sergeant-Major Andrew Henry, Royal Artillery, winning the V.C. at Inkermann, 5 November 1854 (Royal Artillery Institution?)
- Private John M'Dermond, 47th Regiment, winning the V.C. at Inkermann, 5 November 1854 (National Army Museum)
- Lieut.-Col. Sir Charles Russell, at the Battle of Inkermann, 5 November 1854 (Grenadier Guards, Horse Guards, Whitehall)
- Colour-Sergeant Henry MacDonald, Royal Engineers, winning the V.C. at Sebastopol, 19 April 1855 (Royal Engineers Museum, Chatham)
- Lieuts Hugh Talbot Burgoyne, R.N., and Cecil William Buckley, R.N., winning the V.C. at Genitchi, 29 May 1855 (Wantage Town Council Offices)
- Lieut. William Hope, 7th Fusiliers, winning the V.C. at Sebastopol, 18 June 1855 (Royal Fusiliers Museum, Tower of London)
- Lieut. Howard Craufurd Elphinstone, Royal Engineers, winning the V.C. at Sebastopol, 18 June 1855 (Royal Engineers Museum, Chatham)
- Private John Sims, 34th Regiment, winning the V.C. at Sebastopol, 18 June 1854 (Border Regiment Museum?)
- Sergeant Alfred Ablett, 3rd Battalion Grenadier Guards winning the V.C., 2 September 1855 (Grenadier Guards)
- Corporal Robert Shields, 23rd Regiment, seeking his wounded Adjutant, Lieut. Dyneley at Sebastopol, 8 September 1855 (Royal Welch Fusiliers Museum, Caernarvon Castle)
- Commander George Fiott Day, R.N. winning the V.C. at Genitchi, 17 and 21 September 1855 (National Maritime Museum?)
- Major Christopher Charles Teesdale, winning the V.C. at Kars (destroyed)

=== Indian Mutiny ===
- Lieut. William George Cubitt, 13th Bengal Native Infantry, winning the V.C. at Chinhut, Lucknow, 30 June 1857 (National Army Museum, currently at Royal Military Academy, Sandhurst
- Major Henry Tombs, Bengal Artillery, rescuing his subaltern Lieut. J. Hills from the hands of the Rebels at Lucknow, 9 July 1857 (National Army Museum)
- Lieut. William Alexander Kerr, 24th Bombay Native Infantry, winning the V.C. near Kolapore, July 1857 (National Army Museum currently at Royal Military Academy, Sandhurst)
- Ross Lowis Mangles, Bengal Civil Service carried, though wounded and still under a murdering fire, a wounded soldier of the 37th Regiment near Arrah, 30 July 1857 (National Army Museum, currently at Royal Military Academy, Sandhurst)
- Mr. William Fraser McDonell, Bengal Civil Service, winning the V.C. near Arrah, 30 July 1857 (National Army Museum)
- Major Gough, 5th Bengal European Cavalry, saves the life of his brother Captain H. Gough at Khurkowdah near Rhotuck, August 1857 (National Army Museum, currently at Royal Military Academy, Sandhurst)
- Lieuts. Duncan Charles Home, and Philip Salkeld, Bengal Engineers, with Bugler Hawthorne, 52nd Regiment, winning the V.C. at the Cashmere Gate, Delhi, 14 September 1857 (Royal Engineers, Chatham)
- Surgeon J. Jee, Assistant-Surgeon Valentine M. McMaster, and Lieut. and Adjutant Herbert Taylor Macpherson, 78th Highlanders, winning the V.C. at Lucknow, 25 September 1857 (Queen's Own Highlanders, Fort George)
- Private Henry Ward, 78th Highlanders, winning the V.C. at Lucknow, 25–26 September 1857 (Queen's Own Highlanders Museum, Fort George)
- Surgeon Anthony Dickson Home and Assistant Surgeon W. Bradshaw, 90th Perthshire L.I., winning the V.C. at Lucknow, 25–26 September 1857 (National Army Museum)
- Major Probyn, C.B., 2nd Punjab Cavalry, at the Battle of Agra, 10 October 1857 (National Army Museum currently at Royal Military Academy, Sandhurst)
- Thomas Henry Kavanagh, Assistant-Commissioner in Oude, winning the V.C., 9 November 1857 (National Army Museum)
- Lieut. John Watson, 1st Punjab Cavalry, winning the V.C. at Lucknow, 14 November 1857 (National Army Museum)
- Lieut. Harry North Dalyrymple Prendergast, Madras Engineers, winning the V.C. at Mundisore, 21 November 1857 (Royal Engineers, Chatham)
- Lieut. Frederick Sleigh Roberts, Bengal Artillery, winning the V.C. at Khodagunge, 2 January 1858 (unlocated)
- Lieut. Frederick Robertson Aikman, 4th Bengal Native Infantry, winning the V.C. en route to Lucknow, 1 March 1858 (National Army Museum at Royal Military Academy, Sandhurst)
- Lieut. Thomas Adair Butler, 1st Bengal Fusiliers, winning the V.C. at Lucknow, 9 March 1858 (National Army Museum)
- Lieut. Francis Farquharson, 42nd Highlanders, winning the V.C. at Lucknow, 9 March 1858 (The Black Watch Museum, Perth)
- Lieut. James Leith, 14th King's Light Dragoons, saving Captain Need's life at the Battle of the Betwah, 1 April 1858 (Museum of Lancashire, Stanley Street, Preston)
- Lieut. Henry Evelyn Wood, 1858 (unlocated)
- Private J. R. Roberts, 9th Lancers, 1857 (Never completed; now destroyed)

=== Persian War ===
- Lieuts. Arthur Moore and John Grant Malcolmson winning the V.C. at the Battle of Kooshab, 8 February 1857 (destroyed)

=== China War ===
- Lieut. Robert Montresor Rogers, 44th Regiment, and Lieut. Edmund H. Lenon, 67th Regiment, winning the V.C. at North Taku Fort, 21 August 1860 (Royal Anglian Regiment)

=== Gambia ===
- Private Samuel Hodge, 4th West India Regiment, winning the V.C. at Tubabakolong, Gambia, 1866 (St. John's Hall, Penzance, Cornwall)

=== Afghanistan ===
- March of Major-General Sir F. Roberts from Cabul to Candahar, crossing the Zamburak Kotal, 1880 (Royal Military College of Science, Staff Canteen)
