= Francis Farquharson =

Scottish recipient of the Victoria Cross

Francis Edward Henry Farquharson
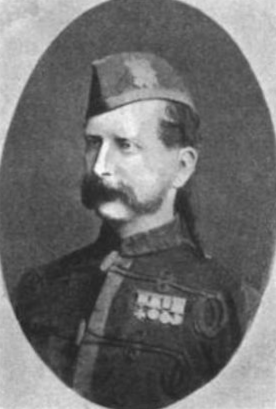
- Born: 25 March 1837; Glasgow, Scotland
- Died: 12 September 1875 (aged 38); Harberton, Devon, England
- Burial place: St Peter's Churchyard, Harberton
- Military career
- Allegiance: United Kingdom
- Branch: British Army
- Rank: Major
- Units: 42nd Regiment of Foot
- Conflicts: Crimean War; Indian Mutiny; Third Anglo-Ashanti War
- Awards: Victoria Cross

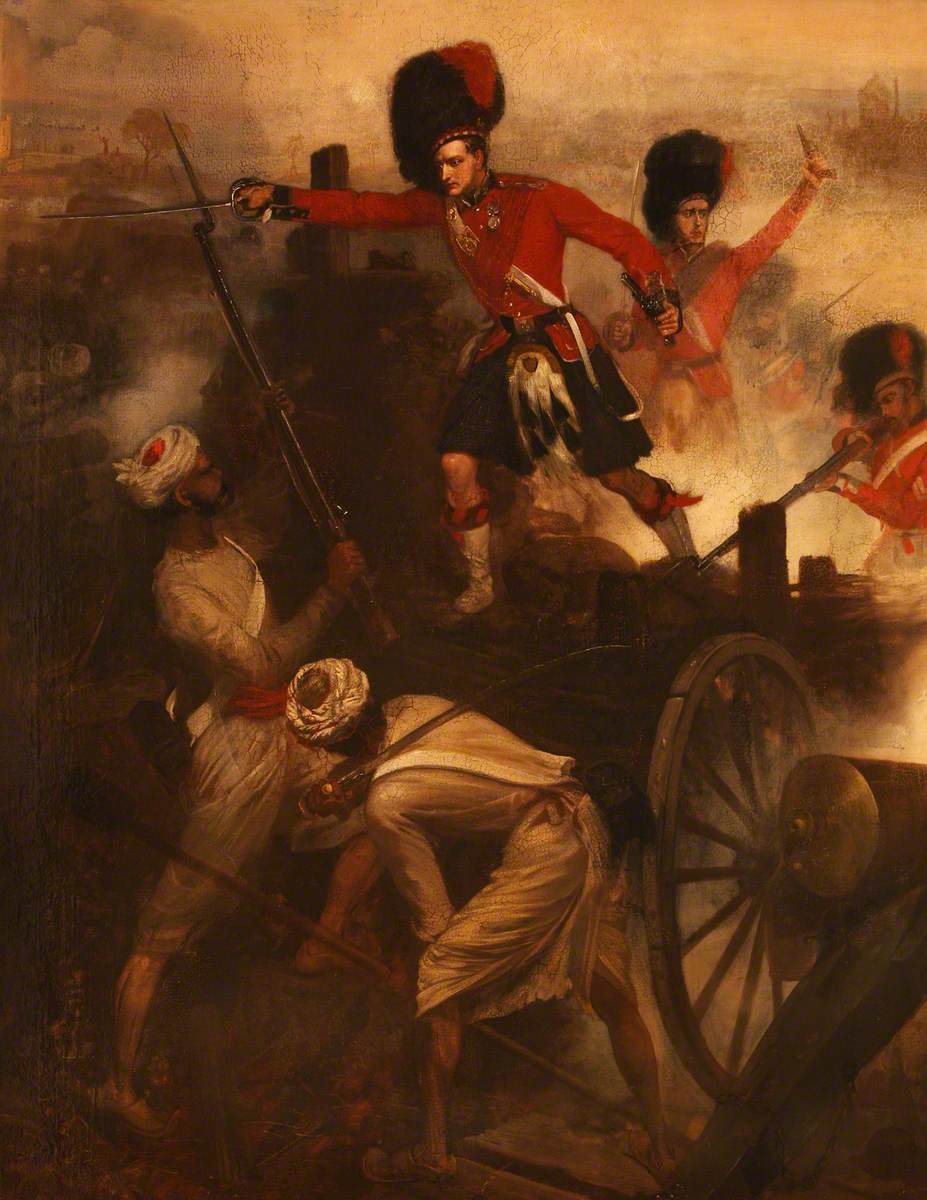
Farquharson winning the Victoria Cross at the Battle of Lucknow, 1858 by Louis William Desanges

Major Francis Edward Henry Farquharson VC (25 March 1837 – 12 September 1875) was a Scottish recipient of the Victoria Cross, the highest and most prestigious award for gallantry in the face of the enemy that can be awarded to British and Commonwealth forces.

== Early life ==
He was born in Glasgow on 25 March 1837 the son of Robert Farquharson, a thread manufacturer living at 7 St James Place.

== Details ==
He was 20 years old, and a lieutenant in the 42nd Regiment of Foot (later The Black Watch (Royal Highlanders)), British Army during the Indian Mutiny when the following deed took place on 9 March 1858 at Lucknow, India for which he was awarded the VC:

For conspicuous bravery, when engaged before Lucknow, on the 9th March, 1858, in having led a portion of his Company, stormed a bastion mounting two guns, and spiked the guns, by which the advanced position, held during the night of the 9th of March, was rendered secure from the fire of Artillery. Lieutenant Farquharson was severely wounded, while holding an advanced position, on the morning of the 10th of March.

== Later life ==
He later achieved the rank of major.

He fell ill during the Ashanti campaign of 1874 and retired from active service. He died at Dundrige in Harberton in Devonshire on 12 September 1875. He is buried a few metres east of the entrance to St Andrew's Church in Harberton. A stained glass window to his memory lies within the church.

His Victoria Cross is displayed at the Black Watch Museum in Perth, Scotland together with his four other campaign medals: the Crimea Medal (Sebastopol); Indian Mutiny Medal (Lucknow); Ashanti Medal (Coomassie); and the Turkish Crimea Medal.

== Artistic recognition ==
He was painted with fellow officers by Orlando Norie.
