= 1st Denbighshire Rifle Volunteers =

Former Welsh unit of the British Army

1st Denbighshire Rifle Volunteers 4th (Denbighshire) Bn, Royal Welch Fusiliers 3rd (V) Bn, Royal Welch Fusiliers
- Active: 30 June 1860–1 July 1999
- Country: United Kingdom
- Branch: Volunteer Force/Territorial Force
- Role: Infantry
- Size: 1-3 Infantry battalions
- Part of: 53rd (Welsh) Division; 47th (1/2nd London) Division
- Engagements: World War I: Aubers Ridge; Loos; High Wood; Messines; Cambrai; German spring offensive; Ancre; Hundred Days Offensive; World War II: Normandy; Reichswald; Rhine

Commanders
- Notable commanders: Sir Watkin Williams-Wynn, 6th Baronet; Col William Cornwallis-West; Lt-Col George Pereira

The 1st Denbighshire Rifle Volunteers, later 4th (Denbighshire) Battalion, Royal Welch Fusiliers, was a Welsh unit of the British Army's auxiliary forces. First raised in 1860, it served as a pioneer battalion with the 47th (2nd London) Division on the Western Front during World War I and with the 53rd (Welsh) Division in North West Europe during World War II. It continued in the postwar Territorial Army through a series of mergers until finally amalgamating with another Welsh battalion in 1999.

== Volunteer Force ==
An invasion scare in 1859 led to the emergence of the Volunteer Movement, and Rifle Volunteer Corps (RVCs) began to be organised throughout Great Britain, composed of part-time soldiers eager to supplement the Regular British Army in time of need. The following units were raised in Denbighshire, North Wales:

- 1st (Wrexham) Denbighshire RVC, formed with two companies on 30 June 1860, with Sir Watkin Williams-Wynn, 6th Baronet, in command (Williams-Wynn was the local MP and also lieutenant-colonel of the Montgomeryshire Yeomanry)
- 2nd (Ruabon) Denbighshire RVC, formed 12 April 1860; Lt-Col Richard Blackwood-Prce, retired from the Royal Artillery (RA), was commissioned as captain-commandant on 7 May
- 3rd (Denbigh & Ruabon) Denbighshire RVC, formed 21 July 1860, with its drill hall at 9 Love Lane, Denbigh
- 4th (Vale of Gresford) Denbighshire RVC, formed 10 September 1860,
- 5th (Gwersyllt) Denbighshire RVC formed in 1860
- 6th (Ruthin) Denbighshire RVC, formed 20 February 1861 under the command of Denbighshire landowner and politician William Cornwallis-West
- 7th (Chirk) Denbighshire RVC, formed 24 August 1861
- 8th (Llanrwst) Denbighshire RVC, formed 25 October 1861; disbanded after January 1865
- 9th (Wrexham) Denbighshire RVC, formed June 1861; disbanded in October 1861

These units were grouped into the 1st Administrative Battalion, Denbighshire Rifle Volunteers, formed at Ruabon on 10 September 1860. Williams-Wynn was promoted to lieutenant colonel of the admin battalion on 27 January 1862. A new 9th (Llangollen) Denbighshire RVC was formed on 6 June 1868.

When the RVCs were consolidated in February 1880 the admin battalion became the 1st Denbighshire Rifle Volunteers with the following organisation:

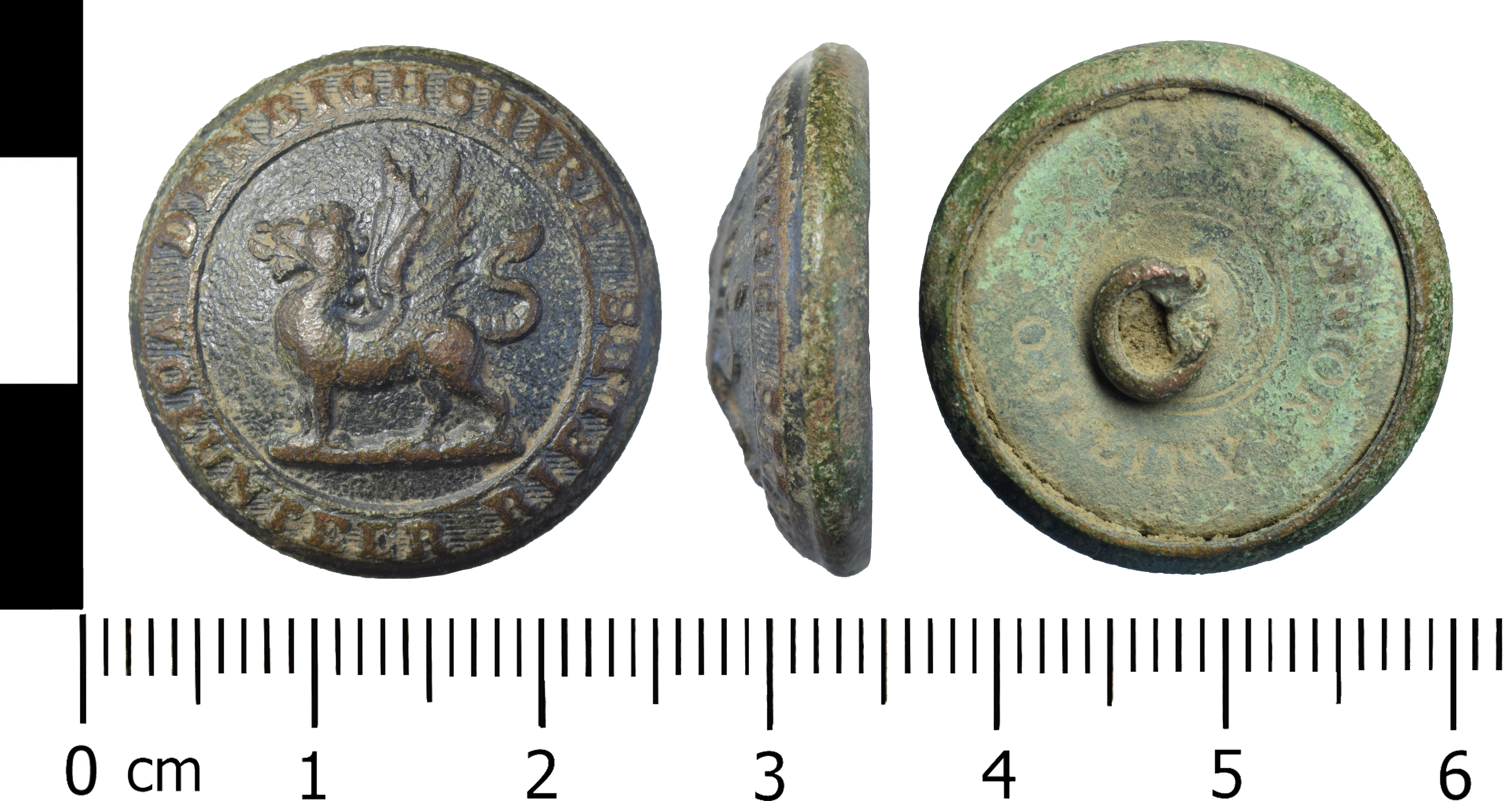
1st Denbighshire Volunteer Rifles button found at Conwy (National Museum Wales; Portable Antiquities Scheme FindID: 890666.)

- A & B Companies at Wrexham – from 1st Denbighshire RVC
- C Company at Ruabon– from 2nd Denbighshire RVC
- D Company at Denbigh – from 3rd Denbighshire RVC
- E Company at Gresford and Chirk – from 4th and 7th Denbighshire RVCs
- F Company at Gwersyllt – from 5th Denbighshire RVC
- G Company at Ruthin – from 6th Denbighshire RVC
- H Company at Llangollen – from 9th Denbighshire RVC

The consolidated battalion moved its headquarters (HQ) from Ruabon to Sir Watkin Williams-Wynn's house at Wynnstay. He remained in command until his death in 1885, when he was succeeded by William Cornwallis-West, who had raised the 6th (Ruthin) Denbighshire RVC.

Under the 'Localisation of the Forces' scheme introduced by the Cardwell Reforms of 1872, Volunteers were brigaded with their local Regular and Militia battalions – Sub-District No 23 in Western District for the Denbighshire Battalion, grouped with the 23rd Foot (Royal Welch Fusiliers). The Childers Reforms of 1881 took Cardwell's reforms further, and the Volunteers were formally affiliated to their local Regular regiment, the 1st Denbighshire becoming a volunteer battalion of the RWF on 1 July 1881; it was redesignated 1st Volunteer Battalion, Royal Welch Fusiliers in June 1884. (Note: The regiment used the spelling 'Welch' in preference to 'Welsh', even though this was not officially recognised until 1920.)

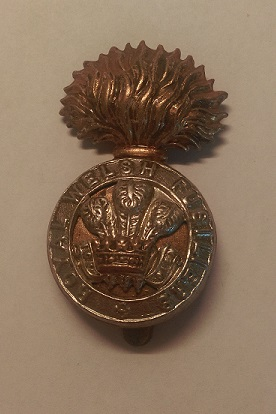
Cap badge of the Royal Welch Fusiliers.

While the sub-districts were later referred to as 'brigades', they were purely administrative organisations and the Volunteers were excluded from the 'mobilisation' part of the Cardwell system. The Stanhope Memorandum of December 1888 proposed a more comprehensive Mobilisation Scheme for Volunteer units, which would assemble in their own brigades at key points in case of war. In peacetime these brigades provided a structure for collective training. Under this scheme the Volunteer Battalions of the RWF formed part of the Welsh Brigade, later moving to the Welsh Border Brigade (renamed the North Welsh Border Brigade in the 1900s).

After Black Week in December 1899, the Volunteers were invited to send active service units to assist the Regulars in the Second Boer War. The War Office decided that one company 116 strong could be recruited from the volunteer battalions of any infantry regiment that had a regular battalion serving in South Africa. The RWF VBs accordingly raised a service company that joined the 1st Battalion and earned the volunteer battalions their first Battle honour: South Africa 1900–02. The 1st VB was expanded to 11 companies in 1900.

== Territorial Force ==
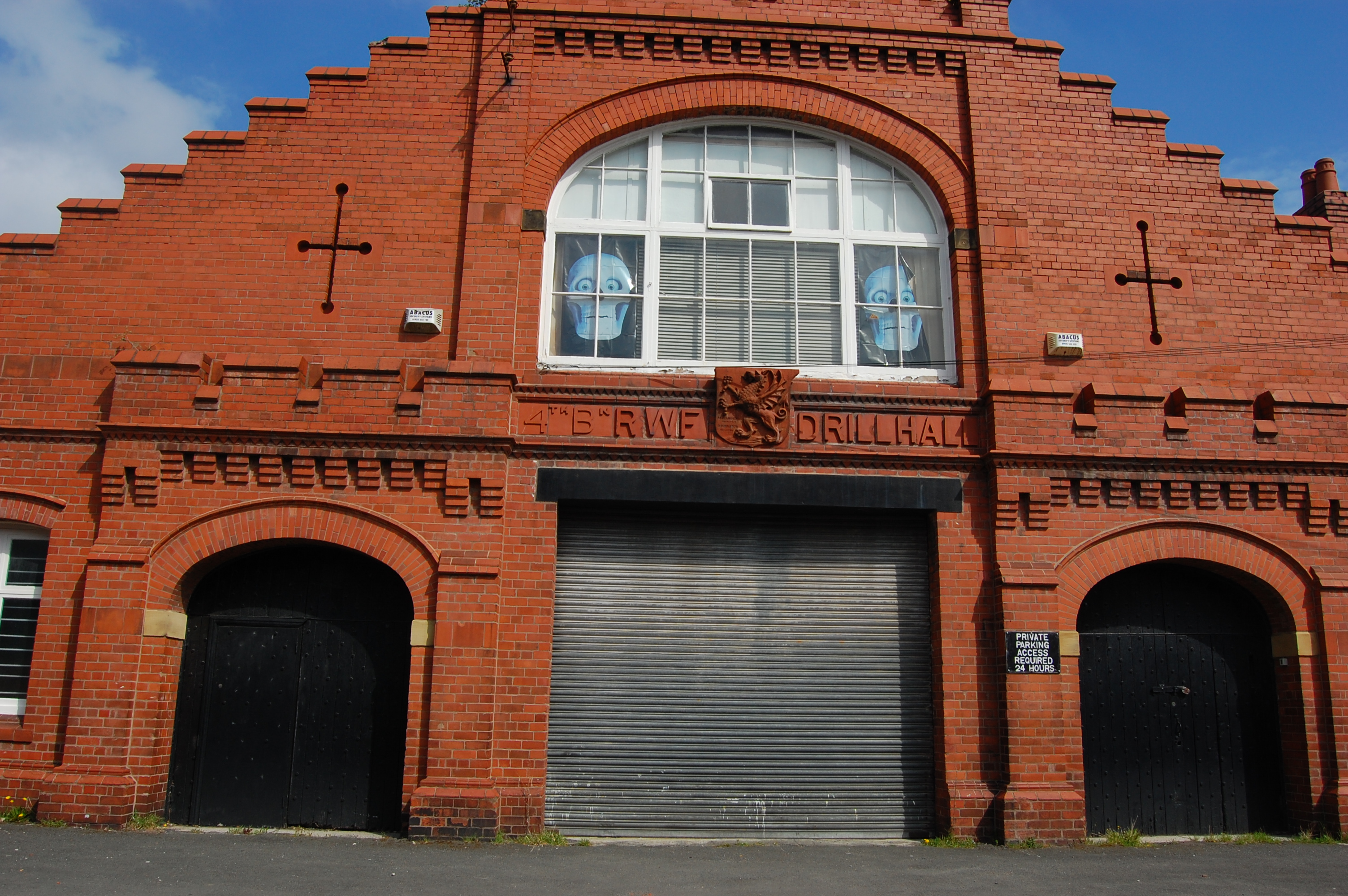
The battalion's HQ at Poyser Street drill hall, Wrexham.

When the Volunteers were subsumed into the new Territorial Force (TF) under the Haldane Reforms of 1908, the 1st VB became the 4th (Denbighshire) Battalion, Royal Welch Fusiliers, (Note: The Denbighshire subtitle was added in March 1909.) organised as follows:

- Battalion HQ and A Company at Poyser Street drill hall, Wrexham
- B Company at Gresford, with a drill station at Ruthin
- C Company at Llangollen Road, Acrefair, near Ruabon
- D Company at Love Lane, Denbigh
- E Company at Coedpath
- F Company at Gwersyllt
- G Company at Rhosllanerchrugog
- H Company at Market Street Memorial Hall, Llangollen, with a drill station at Station Road, Chirk

The battalion formed part of the North Wales Brigade of the TF's Welsh Division.

== World War I ==
=== Mobilisation ===
On 3 August 1914 the Welsh Division's infantry brigades were at their annual camps when all training was cancelled and the battalions were ordered back to their HQs; war was declared next day. On 5 August they mobilised, and had concentrated at their war stations (at Conway in the case of the North Wales Brigade) by 11 August. On that date TF units were invited to volunteer for Overseas Service and on 15 August the War Office issued instructions to separate those men who had signed up for Home Service only, and form these into reserve units. On 31 August, the formation of a reserve or 2nd Line unit was authorised for each 1st Line unit where 60 per cent or more of the men had volunteered for Overseas Service. The titles of these 2nd Line units would be the same as the original, but distinguished by a '2/' prefix. In this way duplicate battalions, brigades and divisions were created, mirroring those TF formations being sent overseas, and were quickly filled by the flood of volunteers coming forward. Later 3rd Line units were formed to train drafts for the 1st and 2nd Line.

=== 1/4th (Denbighshire) Bn, RWF ===
The Welsh Division moved to Northampton at the end of August 1914, where on 18 November it was warned for service in India, but this was subsequently cancelled. Training was interrupted by periods spent digging trenches for the East Coast defences. 1/4th Battalion's offer of overseas service had been accepted, and the battalion left the Welsh Division on 5 November, travelled to France, and joined 3rd Brigade in 1st Division on 7 December. It was one of the first TF units to reinforce the hard-pressed Regular British Expeditionary Force (BEF) on the Western Front.

==== Givenchy ====
The battalion first went into action at Givenchy on 20 December, when two brigades of the division were sent up to support the Indian Corps when it was heavily attacked. 3rd Brigade reached Béthune at 07.30, when it rested, and then moved to the counter-attack soon after noon. The battalions passed through the Indian troops, but were delayed by waterlogged ground and machine gun fire, and it was almost dark when they reached Givenchy, which had just been evacuated by a British battalion. The intended concerted attack was disrupted, and although the brigades recaptured most of the lost ground they were isolated in the dark. However the relief of the exhausted Indian Corps was successfully completed next day. The front in the Givenchy area was never at rest: 1st Division (already weak after the intense fighting in the autumn of 1914) was subjected to constant low-level Trench warfare. 3rd Brigade was attacked on a larger scale on 25 January 1915, but quickly regained its trenches.

==== Aubers Ridge ====
The BEF launched a prepared offensive on 9 May 1915 with the aim of capturing Aubers Ridge, north of La Bassée. The infantry advanced at 05.30 when the preliminary artillery bombardment entered its intense phase. On 3rd Bde's front, 1/4th RWF was in support in the second line. As the leading companies left their breastworks they came under immediate machine gun fire and suffered heavy casualties, though they more or less reached their intended jumping-off line in No man's land, and the supporting battalions made some progress. When the artillery lifted, the leading waves attacked, but could not penetrate the barbed wire, which had been inadequately cut by the guns. A second bombardment did no better in suppressing the machine gun positions, and the leading waves were deadlocked by 07.20. The supporting battalions in the second line could not get forward over No Man's land, which was dominated by German artillery. A renewed attack in the afternoon was also unsuccessful, and the shattered leading units were withdrawn through the supporting battalions. Although casualties in the second line had been less severe, 1/4th RWF lost its commanding officer (CO), Lt-Col Frederick France-Hayhurst, who was killed and was buried in Cabaret-Rouge Cemetery. 1st Division was relieved at the end of the day, and by 12/13 May returned to its former sector at Givenchy. It defended this position during the next offensive (the Battle of Festubert).

==== Loos ====
The BEF spent the summer of 1915 preparing for a much more ambitious offensive: the Battle of Loos. 1st Division was allotted a part in this attack, but on 1 September 1915 the 1/4th RWF was transferred to be the Pioneer Battalion in 47th (1/2nd London) Division (a TF formation). The divisional historian believed that the battalion had been chosen for this specialist role because of the high proportion of Welsh miners among the remaining original personnel. The role of the pioneer battalion was to provide working parties to assist the divisional Royal Engineers (RE) in tasks ranging from trench digging and wiring, to road making, while remaining fighting soldiers. The men received extra pay and the battalion transport was augmented to carry the necessary tools and equipment. The preparations for Loos involved heavy labour for working parties, infantry as well as pioneers and RE, in carrying forward and emplacing gas cylinders in the front line trenches, as well as digging additional assembly trenches – including Russian saps – and creating dumps of stores and equipment.

47th Division formed the southern pivot of the attack. Forty minutes before the assault went in on 25 September, the RE released the gas cloud, supplemented by a smokescreen released by one company of the 1/4th RWF. The rest of the battalion was in divisional reserve at North Maroc, apart from the machine guns, which joined a divisional overhead barrage. On 47th Division's front the gas cloud worked reasonably well, the infantry took the German front trench but suffered heavier casualties among the wire in front of the second position; German counter-attacks also began early on, but the division held onto its objectives among the mine buildings and the 'crassier' or spoilheap at Loos. Further north things had not gone so well, and 47th Division's left flank was unprotected. The pioneers and infantry spent much of the next few days in minor operations and digging to consolidate their position protecting the BEF's flank before they were relieved by French troops on 1 October. The line they dug became the Allied front line for nearly three years.

==== Winter 1915–16 ====
47th Division returned to the line on 5 October, holding off German counter-attacks on 8 October. 1/4th Royal Welch Fusiliers was loaned back to 1st Division for pioneer work for a week before that division made another unsuccessful attack on 13 October; 47th Division then relieved 1st Division and had to repair the heavily damaged trenches. For the next month it held the 'remarkably unpleasant' line of the salient formed during the Battle of Loos, with a heavy workload for the pioneers. A local German attack forced the Londoners out of Essex Trench, threatening a position known as The Hairpin. The RWF set to work digging Russian saps towards it for a counter-attack, but the experienced Welsh miners detected sounds of Germans mining deeper under the Hairpin, and the garrison was reduced. On 30 December the German mine was blown, and the Hairpin was lost. The division returned to relieve the French at Loos on 4 January. In a few weeks the 1/4th RWF dug a tunnel under the Loos Crassier, providing a covered route for the exposed support line.

In March 1916 the division moved to Vimy Ridge. The positions recently taken over from the French were merely shell-holes and mine craters linked up with short trenches, and active mine warfare was going on underneath the ridge. In early May the situation became critical, with 11 German mine galleries suspected beneath the British front line. The RE tunnelling companies drove four counter-mines forward into No man's land and on 3 May fired them, accompanied by a heavy artillery bombardment. The infantry rushed forward, and the divisional RE and 1/4th RWF spent the night consolidating the lips of the three big craters that had been formed. On 21 May the division suffered a very heavy German bombardment followed by a local attack that captured the front and support lines and was only held by pushing all available troops including engineers into the line.

==== Somme ====
In August 1916 47th Division moved south to join in the Somme Offensive, taking over the line in the High Wood sector from 1st Division on 11 September. Its role in the Battle of Flers-Courcelette, beginning on 15 September was to take High Wood, which involved heavy fighting but was achieved before 13.00. Next day it continued towards the 'Starfish Line' beyond, and the position there was consolidated during the night of 17/18 September by 'very gallant and devoted work' by a large working party consisting of two RE sections and companies of 1/4th RWF. This party suffered many casualties on the way up, and then worked on the trench to within 100 yards (91 m) of a troublesome enemy strongpoint. Major S.G. Love, RE, and Lieutenant D.J. Williams, RWF, took a patrol behind this strongpoint, and offered to attack it with a party of 1/4th RWF, but III Corps vetoed this and ordered a retrenchment to be built round it to link up with 50th (Northumbrian) Division; the pioneers carried this out the following night. When 47th Division's exhausted infantry were relieved on 19 September, the pioneers, sappers and gunners were left in the line supporting 1st Division.

The next operation, the Battle of the Transloy Ridges, began on 1 October. 47th Division had begun taking over the line from 1st Division on 27/28 September, and was given Eaucourt L'Abbaye as its objective. The infantry rushed the village but failed to make good the Flers line beyond, which it was intended to consolidate. A renewed attack on 7 October (part of III Corps' Attacks on the Butte de Warlencourt) brought heavy casualties for little gain. Conditions for the RE and pioneers making roads and communications trenches across the heavily shelled ground after each forward bound were very bad. The much-weakened division was withdrawn on 9 October.

==== Ypres ====
On 14 October 47th Division began moving by train to the Ypres Salient where it went into the Hill 60 sector, including 'The Bluff'. Here it took part in regular raids and crater fighting for a number of months, but the labour for 1/4th RWF involved in maintaining and draining trenches, breastworks, dugouts and trench tramways was immense. The narrow-gauge tramway up to the Bluff was frequently broken by enemy shellfire, requiring work by the battalion's breakdown gangs. Lieutenant-Colonel Hawkes of 1/4th RWF acted as commander of 141st (5th London) Brigade for a month during the winter.

For the Battle of Messines, 47th Division was tasked with attacking astride the Ypres–Comines Canal. In the weeks leading up to the attack on 7 June the division had carried out preparations, including digging new trenches and establishing ration and ammunition dumps. Aided by a series of huge mines, the attack went well, the only hold-up being at a strongpoint known as the 'Spoil Bank'.

47th Division was not directly involved in the following Third Ypres Offensive, being in reserve during the Battle of Pilckem Ridge (31 July–2 August) and spending two periods holding the line (18 August–2 September and 8–17 September), described as 'among the most unpleasant in its experience'.

==== Cambrai ====
On 21 September the division entrained for the south, where it took over a quieter sector near Arras. The trenches required considerable maintenance in the winter weather, and active Trench raiding was carried out. For one raid on 4 November, two infantry battalions each sent two companies out of the line for training beforehand, leaving the trenches manned by a composite battalion under the command of Maj T.O. Bury of 1/4th RWF, who carried out the preparations including cutting gaps in the British wire, fixing guides and making steps for the assaulting troops to use. The raid was highly successful.

On 19 November the division began marching to the Cambrai front, where the Battle of Cambrai was launched the next day. On the night of 28/29 November it arrived at Bourlon Wood, where fighting was continuing. On arrival the division's infantry found the frontline trenches barely 4 feet (1.2 m) deep, and they had less than 24 hours to deepen them, add firesteps and wire, while being heavily shelled with Mustard gas, before the Germans launched a major counter-offensive at 10.00 on 30 November. 1/4th Royal Welch Fusiliers were still marching up from Bertincourt to Trescault at this time, and had to struggle forward along congested roads under shellfire. They were sent to garrison the captured Hindenburg Line behind the division. Casualties had been heavy among the defending troops, but on 47th Division's front the attackers were driven back. On 2 December the division attacked to regain the dominating high ground in front of Bourlon Wood. During this period 1/4th RWF carried ammunition up across the gas-contaminated ground, improved the frontline trenches and dug communication trenches, and carried back wounded. However, the exposed salient in the wood was untenable and preparations began on 4 December to withdraw to the Hindenburg Line. 1/4th Royal Welch Fusiliers had the task of preparing four strongpoints in front of this line, and the withdrawal through them was successfully carried out during the night of 4/5 December. The RWF handed over the strongpoints to the infantry next day; these formed part of the BEF's main line of defence (the Flesquières Line) during the winter.

47th Division was rested for the remainder of the month, but on 29 December the 1/4th RWF and RE were sent up to the front to prepare for the division's return to the Flesquières sector between 4 and 10 January 1918. A small salient was abandoned on the night of 14/15 January, which entailed the destruction of numerous dugouts to prevent their use by the enemy. Meanwhile, the defences along the Flesquières ridge were improved.

==== Spring Offensive ====
In early 1918 the BEF was extensively reorganised to deal with a severe manpower shortage. Pioneer battalions adopted a three-company establishment, with 1/4th RWF completing the reorganisation on 27 February. It became simply 4th RWF when the 2/4th battalion was disbanded in March (see below).

In March 47th Division was sent for special training as a counter-attack division. When the German spring offensive opened on 21 March, 47th Division had just relieved another formation in the line on Welsh Ridge and were holding the right flank of Third Army. The main blow fell on the neighbouring Fifth Army, but the division was heavily shelled and later in the day the Germans attacked behind a smoke screen and gained one or two isolated positions before being driven out. 4th Royal Welch Fusiliers was brought up from Léchelle to Metz-en-Couture in support. However, Fifth Army was collapsing and 47th Division, with its flank open, was obliged to fall back from Welsh Ridge to prepared positions along Highland Ridge. Next day the division drove back repeated attacks against Highland Ridge, but the right flank was still open and 4th RWF was ordered to occupy the Metz Switch Line as a flank guard. The trenches in this line were only half-dug and there was little wire. That night (22/23 March) the whole division fell back to the Metz Switch, but the village of Fins on the flank was already occupied by the enemy: a company of 4th RWF with No 11 Motor Machine-Gun Battery were rushed to strengthen this end of the line. During the fighting of 23 March the open right flank of 47th Division was held by just two companies of 4th RWF as the division slowly fell back over Léchelle aerodrome. By dawn on 24 March it was in line between Mesnil-en-Arrouaise and Rocquigny but the Germans continued to push through the gap to its right, threatening the transport hub at Morval. The RWF under Maj J.H.Langton, and RE under Maj Love, were ordered to defend the road until all the retreating transport had passed. The pioneers and sappers, later joined by 11th MMG Bty, inflicted huge casualties on the oncoming Germans with machine gun and rifle fire. By the end of the day the 4th RWF and rest of the division were in High Wood, scene of its battle in 1916, and then pulled back to Bazentin-le-Petit. The gap to the right had been filled, and the division was able to hold its positions throughout 25 March. However, a gap now appeared on the division's left flank, and the 4th RWF, RE and 11th MMG Bty were once again posted as a flank guard. The division to the left had retired behind the River Ancre, and 47th Division was ordered to withdraw during the night of 25/26 March to conform. Once across the Ancre the weak and exhausted division was finally relieved, taking up a reserve defence line in the rear.

The Germans attempted to renew the offensive on 5 April (the Battle of the Ancre). The attack was made after an intense bombardment, and fighting went on all day, with reserves fed in progressively. 4th Royal Welch Fusiliers moved up during the afternoon in support of 142nd (6th London) Brigade. The battalion was now the only reserve remaining to the divisional commander, and he released it to 142nd Bde for a counter-attack to be made against Aveluy Wood at dawn next day. By 04.00 on 6 April A and B Companies 4th RWF were drawn up along the railway bank. They attacked at 05.55: 'No troops could have deployed better or advanced more steadily under such intense fire, and the leadership of the officers could not have been excelled'. Two platoons of A Company got into one corner of the wood and silenced one machine gun, but no further advance was possible. The two companies suffered casualties of 9 officers and 65 other ranks (ORs) killed, 2 officers and 81 ORs wounded. Elsewhere, 47th Division's weak battalions held off German attacks until they were relieved at the end of the day.

==== Hundred Days Offensive ====
47th Division now had three quiet months, resting and then holding a quiet sector of the line, which gave the battalions time to absorb the hundreds of 18-year-old recruits they were sent to fill up their ranks. It tied down German divisions when the Allied Hundred Days Offensive began on 8 August 1918, then joined in at the Battle of Albert on 22 August. There was some confusion among the young soldiers and the division did not achieve its objectives beyond 'Happy Valley', which had to be completed two days later. The battle became one of movement against rearguards until methodical attacks behind Creeping barrages were needed on 31 August and 2 September (the Second Battle of Bapaume). 4th Royal Welch Fusiliers had the task of clearing St Pierre Vaast Wood during the latter attack. The division went forward again on 5 and 6 September against limited opposition, the 4th RWF quickly following up to make tracks across the old Somme battlefield for the guns and wheeled vehicles. They ended this phase of the offensive constructing crossings over the Canal du Nord and artillery tracks forwards.

After a further period of rest, 47th Division was preparing for a move to the Italian Front when it was instead ordered to take part in the final operations on the Western Front. It went back into the line on 2 October to keep touch with the retreating Germans, and advanced across Aubers Ridge that day. As the division advanced over succeeding days, dealing with rearguards, the pioneers helped repair roads and bridges to allow guns and supplies to keep pace with the advance. 47th Division was relieved on 17 October and moved to Lille, where it fought its way through some of the surrounding forts. The Germans evacuated the city and the division marched through it next day. After the orders to move to Italy were finally cancelled, the division accompanied Third Army's commander, Sir William Birdwood, on his ceremonial entry into Lille on 28 October, with 4th RWF in the march-past. The division resumed its place in the Line on 31 October and took up positions along the River Schelde. It crossed the river on 9 November, and the Armistice with Germany on 11 November found the battalion at Bizencourt, near Tournai.

Two weeks after the Armistice, 47th Division moved by road back to the Béthune area where it was billeted in the small mining and agricultural villages for winter quarters. Demobilisation began early in 1919 and most units were reduced to cadre strength by the end of March. The last cadres left France in May and the divisional troops returned to Shoreham-by-Sea. 4th (Denbighshire) Battalion, RWF, was disembodied on 11 June 1919.

==== Commanding Officers ====
The following officers commanded the battalion during the war:

- Lt-Col Frederick France-Hayhurst, (retired captain, 3rd (Militia) Bn RWF), from 4 October 1913; killed 9 May 1915
- Lt-Col George Pereira, CMG, DSO, Grenadier Guards; promoted to command 47th Brigade, 20 January 1916
- Lt-Col W.C.W. Hawkes, DSO, to 27 March 1917
- Lt-Col C.E. Fitch, to 26 June 1917
- Lt-Col W.H. Matthews, DSO, to 24 January 1918
- Lt-Col H. Marshall, MC, to August 1918
- Lt-Col J.H. Langton, DSO, to demobilisation

=== 2/4th (Denbighshire) Battalion ===
The 2/4th (Denbighshire) Bn formed at Wrexham on 11 September 1914. It was assigned to 203rd (2nd North Wales) Brigade in 68th (2nd Welsh) Division, which began to assemble at Northampton in April 1915. It replaced the 53rd (W) Division at Bedford in July. Training was made difficult by the lack of arms and equipment, and the need to supply drafts to the 1st Line units. At first the men were issued with obsolete .256-in Japanese Ariska rifles for training. In July the battalions were reorganised and the Home Service-only men were transferred to Provisional units. By November the 2nd Line battalions were so weak that their establishment was reduced to 600 men. Late in 1915 the 68th (2nd W) Division's battalions handed over their Japanese rifles to the provisional battalions and were issued with some old Lee–Enfield rifles converted to charger loading.

68th (2nd Welsh) Division was assigned to Home Defence duties and in November 1915 it joined First Army in Central Force. By September 1916 the division was in General Reserve for Central Force, and by May 1917 it had transferred to Northern Army (Home Forces). From April 1917 the 2/4th Bn was at Henham Park in Halesworth, Suffolk, for its summer station, and then moved to Great Yarmouth, where it was disbanded in March 1918.

=== 3/4th (Denbighshire) Battalion ===
The 3/4th (Denbighshire) Bn formed at Wrexham on 25 March 1915. It was redesignated as 4th (Reserve) (Denbighshire) Bn, RWF, on 8 April 1916 and on 1 September 1916 it absorbed the 5th (Flintshire), 6th (Carnarvon & Anglesey) and 7th (Merionethshire & Montgomeryshire) (Reserve) Bns, RWF, in the Welsh Reserve Brigade at Oswestry. In March 1918 it moved to Kinmel Camp, and then in July 1918 to Herne Bay where it remained until disbanded on 23 September 1919.

=== 23rd Battalion ===
After the 3rd Line TF battalions were formed in May 1915 the remaining Home Service and unfit men were separated to form brigades of Coast Defence Battalions (termed Provisional Battalions from June 1915). The men from the four TF battalions of the Royal Welch Fusiliers were formed into 47th Provisional Battalion, as part of 4th Provisional Brigade. In March 1916 the Provisional Brigades were concentrated along the South and East Coast of England. The units of 4th Provisional Brigade moved from their home depots to Norfolk, where it was attached to 64th (2nd Highland) Division under the control of Northern Army (Home Forces), with 47th Provisional Battalion billeted at Mundesley.

The Military Service Act 1916 swept away the Home/Foreign service distinction, and all TF soldiers became liable for overseas service, if medically fit. The Provisional Brigades thus became anomalous, and on 1 January 1917 the remaining battalions became numbered battalions of their parent units: 47th Provisional Bn became 23rd Battalion, Royal Welch Fusiliers, and 10th Provisional Brigade became the 224th Mixed Brigade. Part of these units' role was physical conditioning to render men fit for drafting overseas. The battalion as a whole never served overseas: it moved to Hemsby in September 1917. It was disbanded on 12 June 1919 at Aldingham Camp, Lancashire.

== Interwar ==
The TF was reformed on 7 February 1920 and reorganised as the Territorial Army (TA) the following year. As before, the reformed 4th (Denbighshire) Bn RWF was in 158th (Royal Welch) Bde in 53rd (Welsh) Division. In the 1920s a number of Cadet Corps were affiliated to the battalion:

- Grove Park School, Wrexham
- Cadet Unit, 4th Bn RWF
- Rydal Mount School, Colwyn Bay
- Ruthin Grammar School Cadet Corps
- Ruabon Grammar School Cadet Corps

With the expansion of the TA after the Munich Crisis, the 4th formed a duplicate 8th (Denbighshire) Bn on 1 July 1939.

== World War II ==
=== 4th (Denbighshire) Bn ===
Formation sign of the 53rd (Welsh) Division, World War II.

53rd (Welsh) Division mobilised in Western Command on the outbreak of war in September 1939. Parts of the division were sent to Northern Ireland from October 1939, and the whole division was stationed there from 3 April 1940 to 30 April 1941 as part of VI Corps.

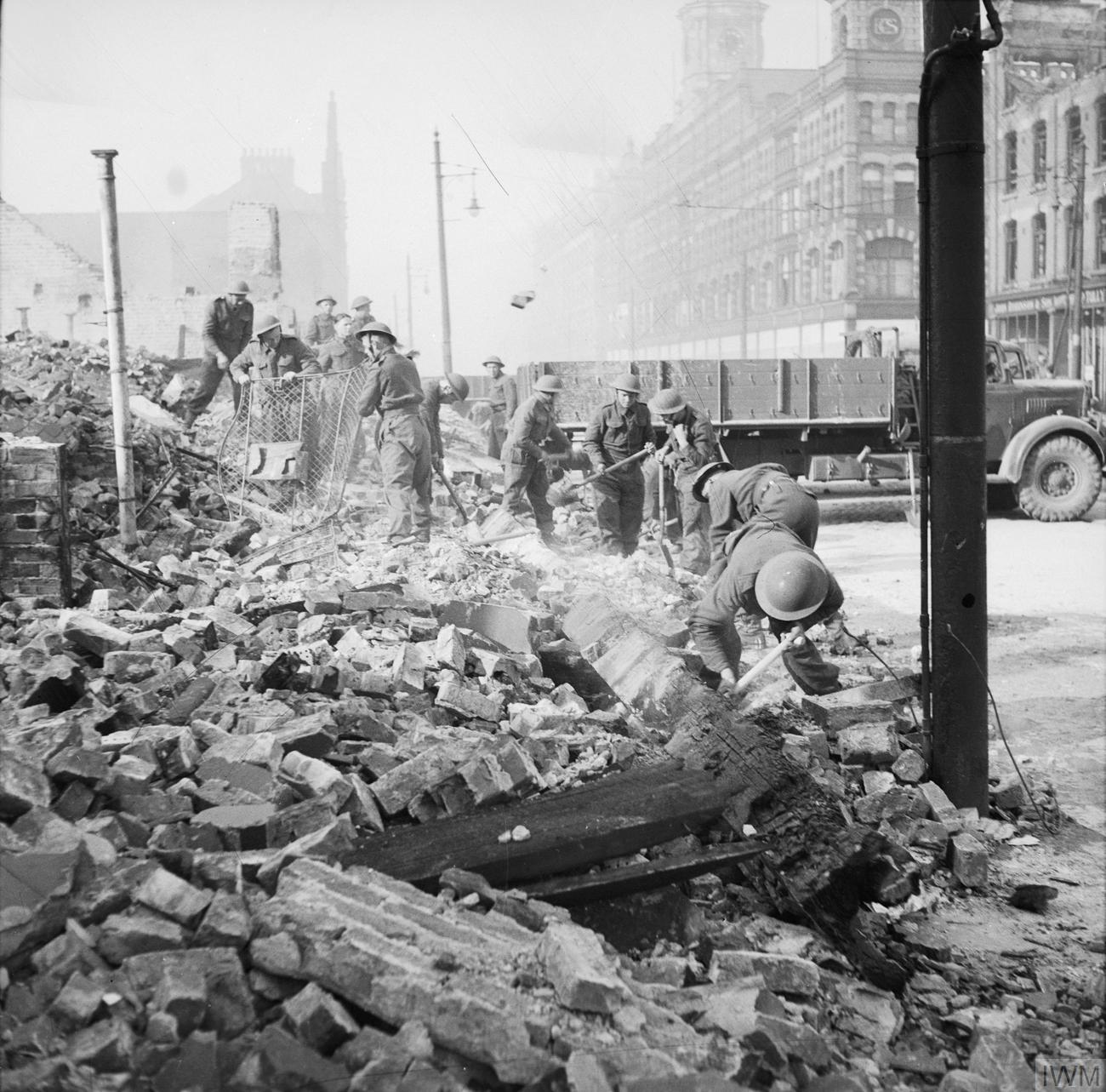
Royal Welch Fusiliers help to clear air raid damage in Belfast, Northern Ireland, 7 May 1941.

On returning to mainland Britain, the division served under III Corps and Western Command. On 8 April 1942 it was assigned to XII Corps District, then from 15 May 1943 with XII Corps it became part of 21st Army Group training for the Allied invasion of Normandy (Operation Overlord).

==== Normandy ====
53rd (Welsh) Division was not involved in the first landings on D Day; 158th Bde sailed to Normandy on 20 June 1944 and landed at La Rivière on Gold Beach four days later. On the night of 29/30 June the division began moving into 'Scottish Corridor' to relieve the 15th (Scottish) Division, which had battered its way into the enemy lines during the Battle of the Odon (Operation Epsom); the relief was completed on 1/2 July. 53rd (Welsh) Division played a minor part in the next offensive phase, Operation Jupiter, guarding the western flank of the attack.

Preparatory attacks for Operation Goodwood began on 15 July with XII Corps pushing towards Évrecy. 53rd (Welsh) Division captured Cahier, but only held onto it with difficulty against heavy enemy counter-attacks. After 'Goodwood' had failed to break through south of Caen, 53rd (W) Division relieved 15th (S) Division at the le Bon Repos crossroads during the night of 19/20 July. On 21 July the position came under heavy attack by 10th SS Panzer Division, losing some ground and suffering heavy casualties. Following these casualties, the three RWF battalions of 158th Bde were split up across the division, with 4th RWF transferring on 4 August to 71st Bde.

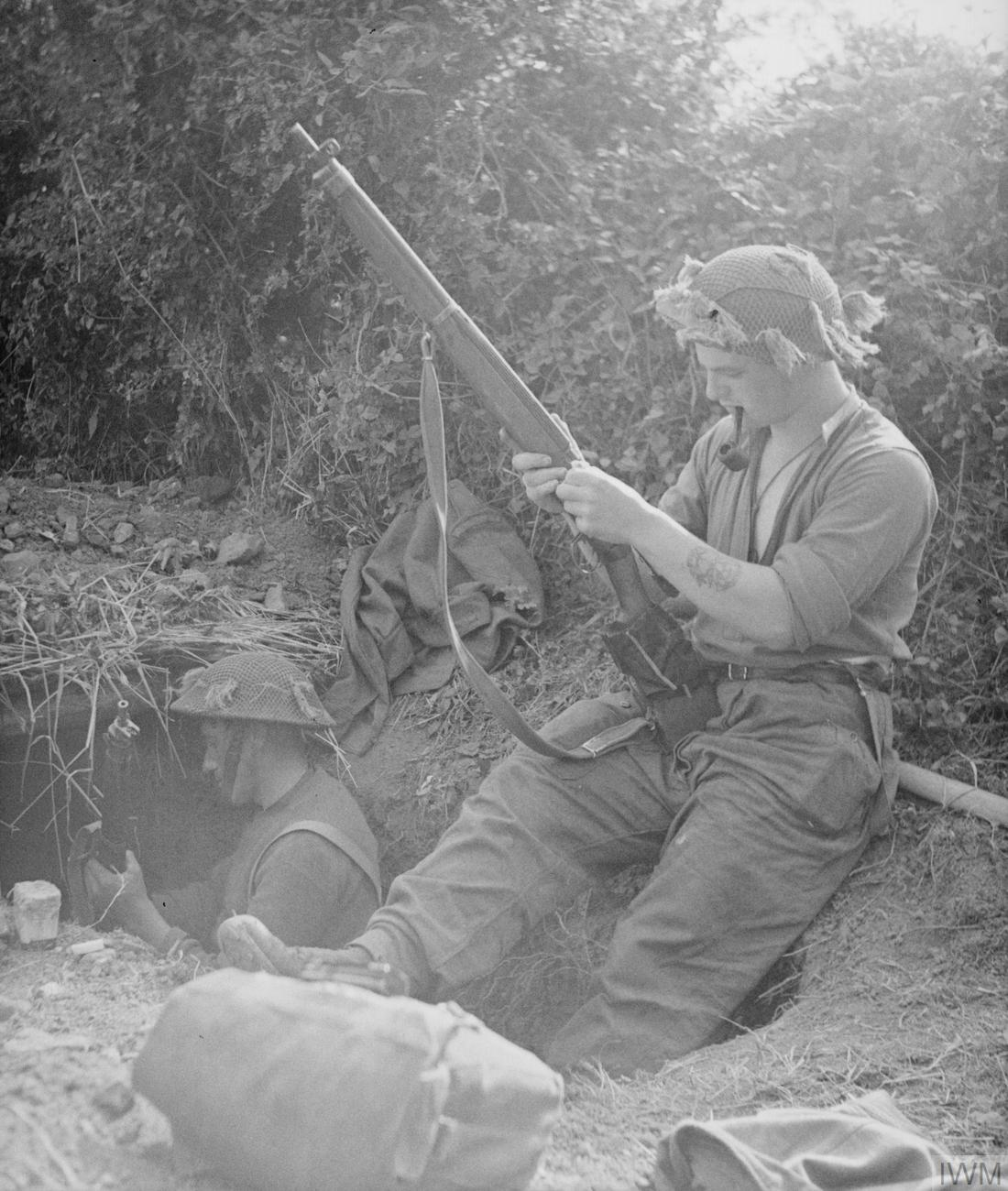
Royal Welch Fusiliers cleaning their rifles before the attack at Évrecy.

When the breakout from the Normandy beachhead began in early August, XII Corps began pushing south, with 53rd (W) Division clearing the east bank of the River Orne, while XXX Corps captured Mont Pinçon. 21st Army Group then endeavoured to close the northern side of the Falaise Gap to prevent the Germans escaping eastwards. By 18–19 August the division was in defensive positions west of Falaise, and on 20 August it captured Bazoches-au-Houlme.

After the Falaise Pocket was eliminated, XII and XXX Corps led 21st Army Group's rapid advance eastwards to the Seine. 15th (Scottish) Division seized bridgeheads on 27 August, and because the armour was not ready it was 53rd (W) Division that led the advance out of the bridgehead towards the Somme. On 30 August 53rd (W) Division was motoring forward with an open flank, but ran into a lot of scattered opposition. The Somme was crossed on 1 September. Opposition stiffened as the division pushed through La Bassée and Béthune on 3 September, but 7th Armoured Division bypassed this opposition and drove on while 53rd (W) Division stayed to 'mop up'. On 4 September the division cleared St Pol and was working its way through the canal area west of Lille. By 6 September 21 Army Group's advance had been halted at the lines of the Albert Canal and the Escaut Canal, where it regrouped.

==== North West Europe ====
XII Corps had a relatively minor role in Operation Market Garden, XXX Corps' attempt to 'bounce' a succession of bridges as far as Arnhem on the Rhine. However, 53rd (W) Division was engaged in heavy fighting to cross the Junction Canal and then clear the Wilhelmina Canal on XXX Corps' left flank. After the failure at Arnhem, the division continued to push forwards in Operation Pheasant, capturing 's-Hertogenbosch on 26 October after five days of hard fighting. It was then moved south to face the Venlo Pocket along the west bank of the River Maas.

When the Germans launched a major counter-offensive in the Ardennes (the Battle of the Bulge) in December 1944, 71st Bde was attached to 6th Airborne Division, which had been rushed back from the UK to reinforce the northern flank of the 'Bulge'. It later recaptured much of the lost ground despite enemy counter-attacks.

The Allied offensive was renewed in February 1945. 53rd (Welsh) Division was now in XXX Corps, which was tasked with clearing the Reichswald in Operation Veritable. Led by 71st Bde, the division began working its way to the Brandenberg and Stoppelberg features before fighting its way to Goch and Weeze. This battle saw some of the most bitter fighting of the campaign, amid mud and mines, and 53rd (W) Division's experience was described by Lt-Gen Brian Horrocks, XXX Corps' commander, as 'one of the most unpleasant weeks of the war'. 4th Battalion suffered partiocularly badly at Goch. Having cleared the west bank of the Rhine, 21st Army Group stormed across the river on 23/24 March in Operation Plunder. 53rd (Welsh) Division crossed into the bridgehead on 26 March for the breakout, and then continued its advance across Germany to the River Elbe against stiff opposition. During the advance 71st Bde operated with 7th Armoured Division from 4 to 7 April, then with 51st (Highland) Division from 29 April to 1 May.

The German surrender at Lüneburg Heath saw 4th (Denbighshire) Battalion in Hamburg. It was placed in suspended animation after August 1945.

=== 8th (Denbighshire) Bn ===
Formation sign of the 38th (Welsh) Division, World War II.

At the outbreak of war 8th RWF had been assigned to 115th Bde in 38th (Welsh) Infantry Division, the 2nd Line duplicate of 53rd (Welsh) Division. The division was still forming when war was declared and only assumed full control of its units on 18 September. It remained training in South Wales during the early part of the war, then moved to North West England under III Corps. By May 1941 it was in reserve just behind the invasion-threatened coast of Sussex. However, at the end of the year it was placed on a lower establishment, as a static coast defence formation with no prospect of active service overseas. It spent 1942–43 in various locations in Southern England.

From 10 March 1944, 115th Bde was given the task of organising 'B' Marshalling Area in Southern Command for the invasion forces earmarked for Operation Overlord. This ended on 4 July, when brigade HQ became the planning staff for the re-occupation of the Channel Islands (Force 135) and its units were posted away. By 15 August most of 38th Division's personnel had been drafted as reinforcements to 21st Army Group, and it was dispersed. The 8th (Denbighshire) Battalion, RWF, was placed in suspended animation on 13 September 1944 at Park Camp.

== Postwar ==
When the TA was reconstituted on 1 January 1947, 4th (Denbighshire) Bn RWF was reformed at Poyser Street and re-absorbed the 8th Bn. It continued as part of 158 (Royal Welch Fusiliers) Infantry Brigade. The battalion had the following organisation:

- HQ at Wrexham
- A Company at Wrexham
- B Company at Broughton
- C Company at Acrefin
- D Company at Denbigh

=== 4th (T) Battalion ===
The TA was converted into the Territorial and Army Volunteer Reserve (TAVR) on 1 April 1967, with the battalion reorganising as A Company (Royal Welch Fusiliers) in the Welsh Volunteers as part of TAVR II at Wrexham, and 4th (Territorial) Battalion, Royal Welch Fusiliers in TAVR III. The 4th (T) Battalion consisted of HQ at Wrexham and two companies, A at Mold, Flintshire, and B at Wrexham. However, after two years 4th (T) Bn was reduced to a cadre under the Welsh Volunteers.

=== 3rd (V) Battalion ===
The Welsh Volunteers was split up on 1 April 1971, and a new 3rd (Volunteer) Battalion, Royal Welch Fusiliers, was created from the North Wales companies and cadres, with the following organisation:

- HQ Company at Poyser Street Drill Hall, Wrexham
- A (4th Battalion Royal Welch Fusiliers) Company at Wrexham, with platoons at Mold and Connah's Quay
- B (Flintshire & Denbigh Yeomanry) Company at Colwyn Bay with a platoon at Prestatyn
- D (6th/7th Battalion, Royal Welch Fusiliers) Company at Caernarfon with platoons at Bangor, and Aberystwyth

The former 5th (Flintshire) Bn RWF had merged with the Denbighshire Yeomanry in 1956, so the new battalion contained the successor units of all four original Territorial battalions of the RWF.

In 1986 the companies were reorganised as follows:

- HQ Company at Wrexham, absorbed the Wrexham elements of A Company
- A Company at Aberystwyth, formed from elements of D Company
- B Company at Colwyn Bay, with a new platoon at Llandudno; Prestatyn platoon moved to Rhyl
- C Company at Connah's Quay and Mold, expanded from elements of A Company
- D Company at Caernarfon, with platoon at Bangor and new platoon at Holyhead, Anglesey
- E (Home Service Force) Company newly raised

There was a further reorganisation in 1992 when the HSF was stood down and an establishment of three rifle companies was adopted:

- HQ Company at Wrexham, absorbed A Company as Recce Platoon at Aberystwyth
- A Company at Queensferry, Flintshire, redesignation and relocation of C Company
- B Company at Colwyn Bay, with platoon at Llandudno (Rhyl platoon disbanded)
- C Company at Caernarfon, with platoon at Bangor (Holyhead platoon disbanded)

On 1 July 1999 the 3rd (V) Bn, Royal Welch Fusiliers, and 2nd (V) Bn, Royal Regiment of Wales, were amalgamated as the Royal Welsh Regiment. The RWF contributed A (RWF) Company at Wrexham with a platoon at Queensferry, and D (RWF) Company at Colwyn Bay with a platoon at Carnarfon, and continued to wear their RWF cap badges. The Royal Welsh became the 3rd Battalion of the amalgamated regiment of Wales, the Royal Welsh, on 1 March 2006.

== Honorary Colonels ==
The following served as Honorary Colonel of the 1st Volunteer Battalion, RWF, and its successors:

- Col William Cornwallis-West, VD, former CO, appointed 19 April 1890.
- Col T.A. Wynne-Edwards, VD, former CO, appointed 28 October 1919
- Col E.L Edwards, TD, appointed 31 July 1926
- Brig-Gen C.S. Owen, CMG, DSO, appointed 1 January 1947
- Lt-Col P.R. Davies-Cooke, TD, appointed 23 January 1953
- Maj-Gen L.H.O.Pugh, CB, CBE, DSO, appointed 27 November 1961

== Uniforms and insignia ==
The uniform of the 1st Volunteer Bn was scarlet with blue facings, matching that of the RWF. In 1908 Regimental Colours were authorised for TF battalions, the 4th Bn's carrying the single Battle Honour South Africa 1900–02. In 1925 TA battalions were allowed to add the battle honours of their parent regiments; in addition the RWF battalions were granted the privilege of wearing the regiment's back flash (five black ribbons below the back of the collar).

== Memorials ==
The RWF's regimental memorial for World War I and World War II, a sculpted group by Sir William Goscombe John, stands at the junction of Bodhyfryd and Chester roads in Wrexham. A memorial plaque to the World War I dead of the 4th (Denbighshire) Battalion was erected at the Poyser Street drill hall, and was later moved to the Barracks Drill Hall in Wrexham.

The original (1909) Colours of the 4th (Denbighshire) Battalion were laid up on 7 November 1954 in St Giles' Church, Wrexham. The replacement set, presented in 1954 and later carried by the 3rd (V) Bn, TAVR, were also laid up in St Giles's on 5 September 1976.
