= Poyser Street drill hall, Wrexham =

Former military installation in Wrexham, Wales

Poyser Street drill hall
- Wrexham
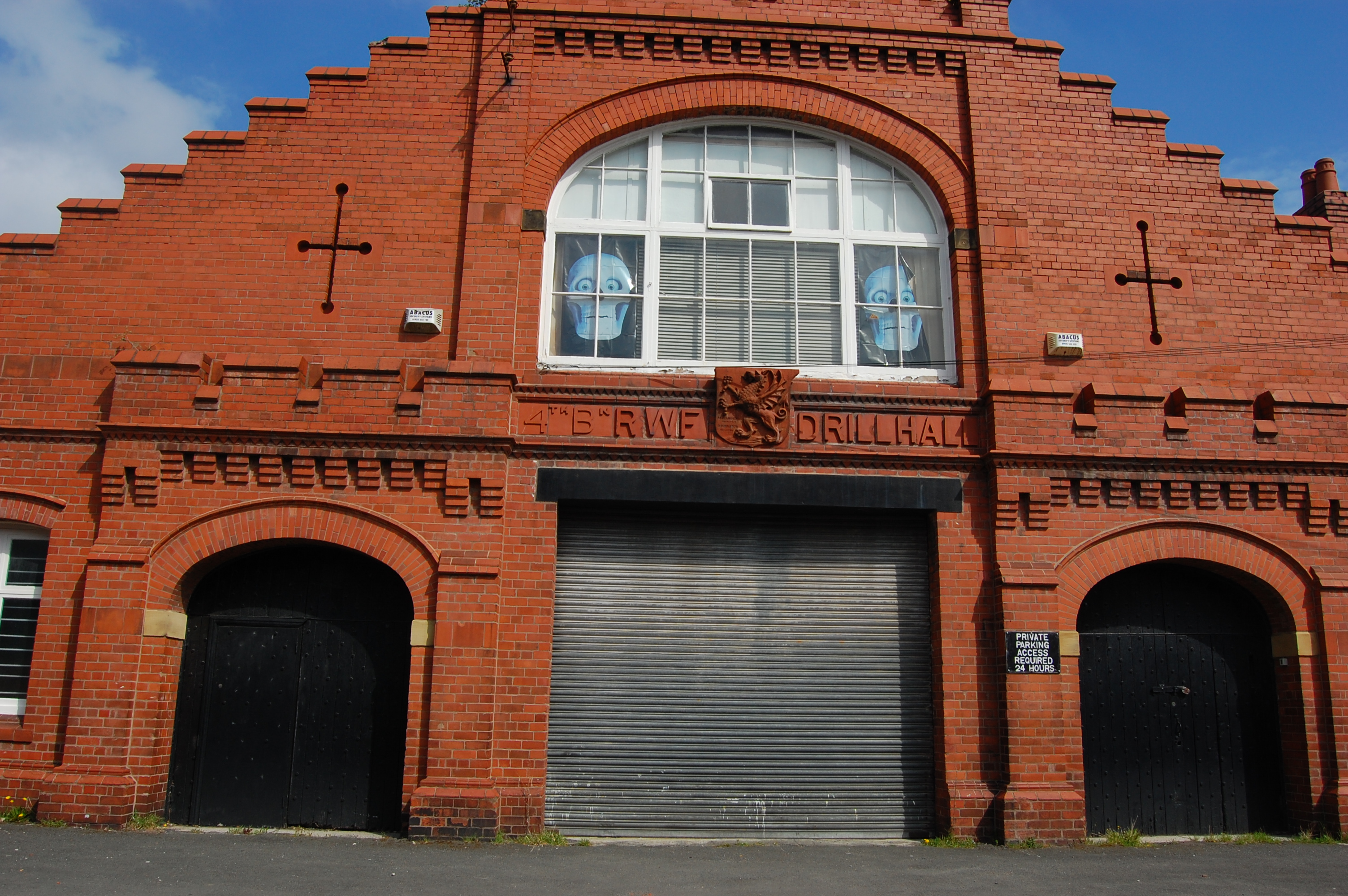
- Poyser Street drill hall

Site information
- Type: Drill hall

Location
- Location in Wrexham County Borough
- Coordinates: 53.04159°N 3.00083°W

Site history
- Built: 1902
- Built for: War Office
- In use: 1902 – Present

The Poyser Street drill hall is a former military installation in Wrexham, Wales.

== History ==
The building was designed as the drill hall of the 1st Volunteer Battalion, Royal Welch Fusiliers, and was completed in 1902. It was opened by Field Marshal Lord Roberts in April 1903. The 1st Volunteer Battalion became the 4th (Denbighshire) Battalion, Royal Welch Fusiliers, in the Territorial Force in 1908. The battalion was mobilised at the drill hall in August 1914 before being deployed to the Western Front during World War I and the drill hall was used by the Home Guard during World War II. The 4th (Denbighshire) Battalion, Royal Welch Fusiliers, still based at the Poyser Street drill hall, evolved to become the 3rd (Volunteer) Battalion, Royal Welch Fusiliers, in the Territorial and Army Volunteer Reserve in 1971. However, in July 1988, a new Territorial Army Centre opened at Hightown Barracks for use by the battalion and the Poyser Street drill hall was decommissioned and converted for industrial use.
