= Hightown Barracks =

Military barracks in Wrexham, Wales

- Wrexham
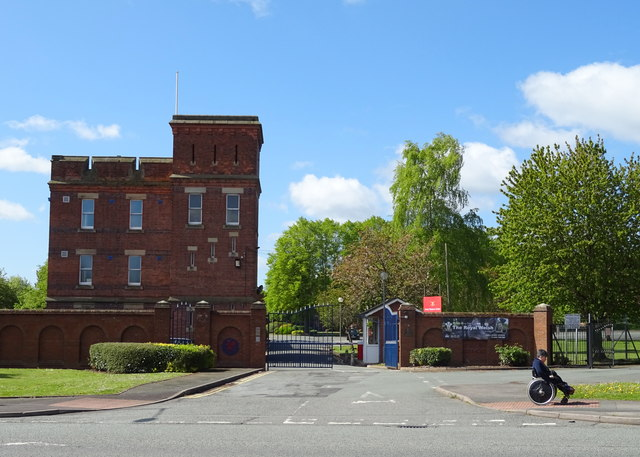
- Hightown Barracks

Site information
- Type: Barracks
- Owner: Ministry of Defence
- Operator: British Army

Location
- Location within Wrexham County Borough
- Coordinates: 53.03775°N 2.98275°W

Site history
- Built: 1877
- Built for: War Office
- In use: 1877–Present

Hightown Barracks is a military installation in Wrexham, Wales.

== History ==
The barracks were built in the Fortress Gothic Revival Style and completed in 1877. Their creation took place as part of the Cardwell Reforms which encouraged the localisation of British military forces. The barracks became the depot for the two battalions of the 23rd Royal Welch Fusiliers. Following the Childers Reforms, the regiment evolved to become the Royal Welch Fusiliers with its depot in the barracks in 1881.

Many recruits were enlisted at the barracks at the start of the First World War and the Denbighshire Hussars also moved their headquarters there just before the start of the war. The barracks were also used by a commando unit during the Second World War. The Royal Welch Fusiliers amalgamated with the Royal Regiment of Wales to form the Royal Welsh in 2006 and troops from the 3rd Battalion of the Royal Welsh left the barracks for the last time in November 2013. Although the barracks continued to be used by 101 Battalion Royal Electrical and Mechanical Engineers, it was confirmed in 2017 that 101 Battalion would be relocating to Bristol.

A company of the Wales Universities Officer Training Corps is also based at the barracks.

In 2019, it was announced that the Anti-Tank Platoon of 3rd Battalion, Royal Welsh, would be returning to the barracks after a six-year absence from the city and in 2021, under Future Soldier, it was revealed that the presence would expand to a company-sized unit.

In 2023, a statue of a Regimental Goat and Goatmaster, sculpted by Nick Elphick, was unveiled outside the barracks, surrounded by a memorial garden to commemorate the lives of those who served with the regiment. The Regimental Goat had been a mascot of the Royal Welch Fusiliers since the American War of Independence.
