= Royal Welch Fusiliers Museum =

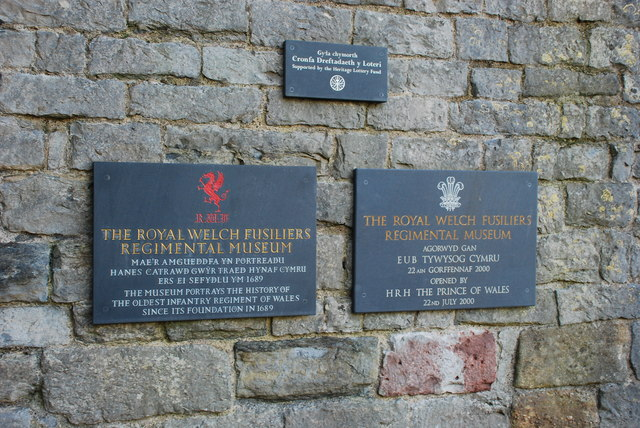
- Royal Welch Fusiliers Museum

- Location within Gwynedd
- Established: 1960
- Location: Caernarfon, Gwynedd, Wales
- Coordinates: 53.1391°N 4.2775°W
- Type: Military museum
- Website: Royal Welch Fusiliers Museum

The Royal Welch Fusiliers Museum is a museum dedicated to the history of the Royal Welch Fusiliers, a historic regiment of the British Army. The museum is located within Caernarfon Castle in Caernarfon, Gwynedd, North Wales. Admission is included with entry to the castle.

== History ==
The museum was established as the Royal Welch Fusiliers Regimental Museum at Caernarfon Castle on 2 June 1960.

== Collection ==
The Royal Welch Fusiliers Museum has a collection and displays, containing links to the regiment's fourteen Victoria Crosses and the writers and poets who have served their country when enlisted in the regiment; men such as Siegfried Sassoon, Robert Graves, Hedd Wyn, David Jones and Frank Richards, and extensive displays relating the long history of the Royal Welch Fusiliers over the centuries.
