= Caernarfon Barracks =

Military building in Caernarfon, Wales

- Caernarfon
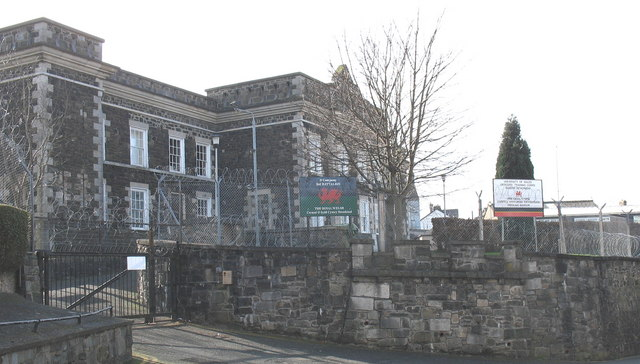
- Caernarfon Barracks

Site information
- Type: Drill hall

Location
- Location in Gwynedd
- Coordinates: 53.13939°N 4.26708°W

Site history
- Built: 1855
- Built for: War Office
- In use: 1855 – Present

Caernarfon Barracks is a military installation in Caernarfon, Wales.

== History ==
The building was commissioned by John Lloyd, County Surveyor of Caernarfonshire, as a military headquarters and was completed in 1855. It became the headquarters of units of the Carnarvon Rifle Volunteer Corps when they were raised in March 1860 and went on to become the headquarters of the 3rd Volunteer Battalion, Royal Welch Fusiliers, when that unit was formed in 1897. The battalion evolved to become the 6th (Caernarvonshire and Anglesey) Battalion, Royal Welch Fusiliers, in 1908. The battalion was mobilised at the drill hall in August 1914 before being deployed to Gallipoli and ultimately to Palestine.

After the Second World War the battalion converted to become the 635th Light Anti-Aircraft Regiment, Royal Artillery (Royal Welch) and evolved to become the 446th (Royal Welch) Airborne Light Anti-Aircraft Regiment, Royal Artillery, while still based at the barracks, in 1955. It reverted to infantry stratus and amalgamated with the 7th Battalion, Royal Welch Fusiliers to form the 6th/7th Battalion, The Royal Welch Fusiliers in 1956. However, the presence at the barracks was reduced to a single company, D Company of the 3rd (Volunteer) Battalion, The Royal Welch Fusiliers in 1971 and further reduced to a rifle platoon of D Company, The Royal Welsh Regiment in 1991 and evolved to be a rifle platoon of D Company, The 3rd Battalion, The Royal Welsh in 2006. Although the Ministry of Defence had previously indicated its intention to close the barracks, a reprieve was announced in March 2017.
