= 1st Flintshire Rifle Volunteers =

Former Welsh unit of the British Army

1st Flintshire Rifle Volunteers 5th (Flintshire) Bn, Royal Welch Fusiliers 60th (Royal Welch Fusiliers) A/T Rgt, RA 101st LAA/AT Rgt, RA 384 (Royal Welch Fusiliers) A/T Rgt, RA
- Active: 27 March 1860– 31 October 1956
- Country: United Kingdom
- Branch: Volunteer Force/Territorial Army
- Role: Infantry; Anti-tank artillery
- Size: 1-3 Infantry battalions 2 Artillery regiments
- Part of: 53rd (Welsh) Division; 1st Armoured Division
- Garrison/HQ: Rhyl; Hawarden; Flint
- Engagements: First World War: Gallipoli; Battle of Scimitar Hill; Palestine; First Battle of Gaza; Battle of Tell 'Asur; Second World War: France; Battle of Abbeville; Western Desert; Battle of Gazala; Defence of Outpost Snipe; Tunisia; Tebaga Gap; Italy; Operation Olive

Commanders
- Notable commanders: Rudolph Feilding, 8th Earl of Denbigh

The 1st Flintshire Rifle Volunteers, later 5th (Flintshire) Battalion, Royal Welch Fusiliers, was a Welsh unit of the British Army's auxiliary forces. First raised in 1860, it fought as infantry at Gallipoli), in Egypt and Palestine during the First World War. Converted to the anti-tank role, it fought in the Battle of France, the Western Desert and Italy in the Second World War. It continued in the postwar Territorial Army until amalgamated with a neighbouring unit in 1956.

== Volunteer Force ==
An invasion scare in 1859 led to the emergence of the Volunteer Movement, and Rifle Volunteer Corps (RVCs) began to be organised throughout Great Britain, composed of part-time soldiers eager to supplement the Regular British Army in time of need. The following units were raised in Flintshire, North Wales:

- 1st (Mold) Flintshire RVC, formed 27 March 1860, with its Drill Hall in High Street, Mold
- 2nd (Hawarden) Flintshire RVC, formed 30 April 1860
- 3rd (Vale of Clwyd) Flintshire RVC, formed at Rhyl by May 1860
- 4th (Holywell) Flintshire RVC, formed 29 June 1860,
- 5th (Flint) Flintshire RVC formed on 3 February 1863 or 13 April 1864
- 6th (Caergwrle) Flintshire RVC, formed 16 December 1874

These units were grouped into the 1st Administrative Battalion, Flintshire Rifle Volunteers, formed at Rhyl in August 1860. William Henry Gladstone, son of the future Prime Minister William Ewart Gladstone who lived at Hawarden Castle, was commissioned as an ensign in the Hawarden Corps. Viscount Feilding, heir of the Earl of Denbigh, was the first captain-commandant of the 4th RVC; he became major in command of the 1st Admin Bn in 1862.

The 1st Admin Bn moved its headquarters (HQ) from Rhyl to Holywell in 1863, but returned in 1874. In that year the 1st Admin Bn of Carnarvonshire RVCs (Note: The contemporary spelling of 'Carnarvon' was later changed to Caernarvon, and then to the presently-accepted Caernarfon.) was disbanded and the Flintshire battalion incorporated the surviving RVCs in that county:

- 2nd (Carnarvon) Carnarvonshire RVC – disbanded 1877
- 3rd (Carnarvon) Carnarvonshire RVC
- 4th (Tremadoc) Carnarvonshire RVC
- 5th (Pwllheli) Carnarvonshire RVC – disbanded 1877

After the corps at Pwllheli was disbanded it was replaced by a new 5th Carnarvonshire RVC raised from Llanberis in 1878.

When the RVCs were consolidated in February 1880 the admin battalion became the 1st Flintshire and Carnarvonshire Rifle Volunteers with the following organisation:

- A Company at Mold – from 1st Flintshire RVC
- B Company at Hawarden– from 2nd Flintshire RVC
- C Company at Rhyl – from 3rd Flintshire RVC
- D Company at Holywell – from 4th Flintshire RVC
- E Company at Flint – from 5th Flintshire RVC
- F Company at Caergwle – from 6th Flintshire RVC
- G & H Companies at Carnavon – from 3rd Carnarvonshire RVC
- I Company at Portmadoc – from 4th Carnarvonshire RVC
- K Company at Llanberis – from 5th Carnarvonshire RVC

Under the 'Localisation of the Forces' scheme introduced by the Cardwell Reforms of 1872, Volunteers were grouped into county brigades with their local Regular and Militia battalions – Sub-District No 23 in Western District for the Flintshire Battalion, grouped with the 23rd Foot (Royal Welch Fusiliers). The Childers Reforms of 1881 took Cardwell's reforms further, and the Volunteers were formally affiliated to their local Regular regiment, the 1st Flint & Carnarvon becoming a volunteer battalion of the RWF on 1 July 1881; it was redesignated 2nd Volunteer Battalion, Royal Welch Fusiliers in June 1884.

While the sub-districts were later referred to as 'brigades', they were purely administrative organisations and the Volunteers were excluded from the 'mobilisation' part of the Cardwell system. The Stanhope Memorandum of December 1888 proposed a more comprehensive Mobilisation Scheme for Volunteer units, which would assemble in their own brigades at key points in case of war. In peacetime these brigades provided a structure for collective training. Under this scheme the two Volunteer Battalions of the RWF formed part of the Welsh Brigade, later moving to the Welsh Border Brigade (renamed the North Welsh Border Brigade in the 1900s).

By 1896 the battalion had 16 companies, but on 26 May 1897 the eight Carnarvonshire companies were separated to form a new 3rd VB of the RWF, when the 2nd VB moved its HQ to Hawarden.

After Black Week in December 1899, the Volunteers were invited to send active service units to assist the Regulars in the Second Boer War. The War Office decided that one company 116 strong could be recruited from the volunteer battalions of any infantry regiment that had a regular battalion serving in South Africa. The RWF's VBs accordingly raised a service company that joined the 1st Battalion and earned the volunteer battalions their first Battle honour: South Africa 1900–02. The 2nd VB was expanded to 11 companies during the war, but reduced to 10 in 1904.

== Territorial Force ==
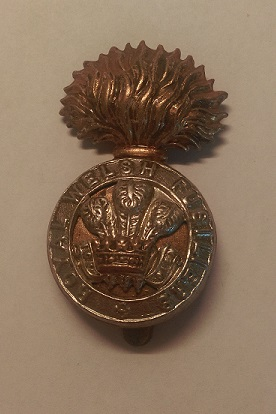
Cap badge of the Royal Welch Fusiliers

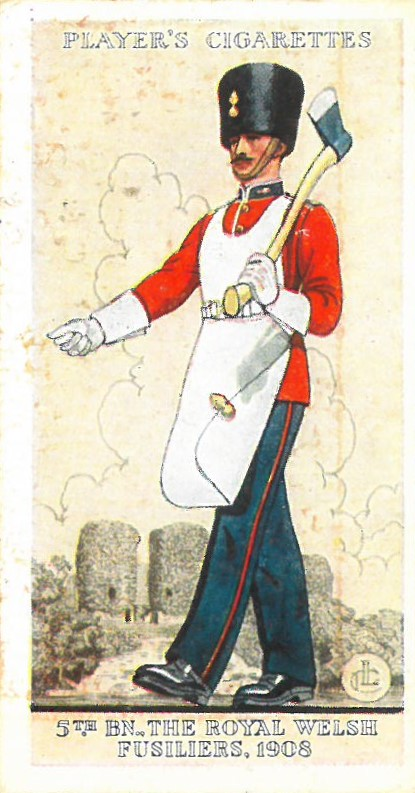
Player's cigarette card showing a pioneer of the 5th (Flintshire) Battalion, Royal Welsh Fusiliers in 1908 in full dress uniform.

When the Volunteers were subsumed into the new Territorial Force (TF) under the Haldane Reforms of 1908, the 2nd VB became the 5th (Flintshire) Battalion, Royal Welch Fusiliers, (Note: The regiment used the spelling 'Welch' in preference to 'Welsh', even though this was not officially recognised until 1920.) (Note: The Flintshire subtitle was added in March 1909.)organised as follows:

- Battalion HQ at the Drill Hall, Flint
- A Company at Mold
- B Company at Drill Hall Lane, Hawarden
- C Company at John Street, Rhyl
- D Company at Halkyn Street, Holywell
- E Company at Flint
- F Company at Hill Street, Caergwle
- G Company at Colwyn Bay, Denbighshire
- H Company at Connah's Quay

The battalion was jointly administered by the Denbighshire and Flintshire TF Associations. It formed part of the North Wales Brigade of the TF's Welsh Division.

== First World War ==
=== Mobilisation ===
On 3 August 1914 the Welsh Division's infantry brigades were at their annual camps when all training was cancelled and the battalions were ordered back to their HQs; war was declared next day. The 5th RWF mobilised on 5 August under the command of Lieutenant-Colonel B.E. Phillips, and the units had concentrated at their war stations (at Conway in the case of the North Wales Brigade) by 11 August. On that date TF units were invited to volunteer for Overseas Service and on 15 August the War Office issued instructions to separate those men who had signed up for Home Service only, and form these into reserve units. On 31 August, the formation of a reserve or 2nd Line unit was authorised for each 1st Line unit where 60 per cent or more of the men had volunteered for Overseas Service. The titles of these 2nd Line units would be the same as the original, but distinguished by a '2/' prefix. In this way duplicate battalions, brigades and divisions were created, mirroring those TF formations being sent overseas. Later 3rd Line units were formed to train drafts for the 1st and 2nd Line.

=== 1/5th (Flintshire) Battalion ===
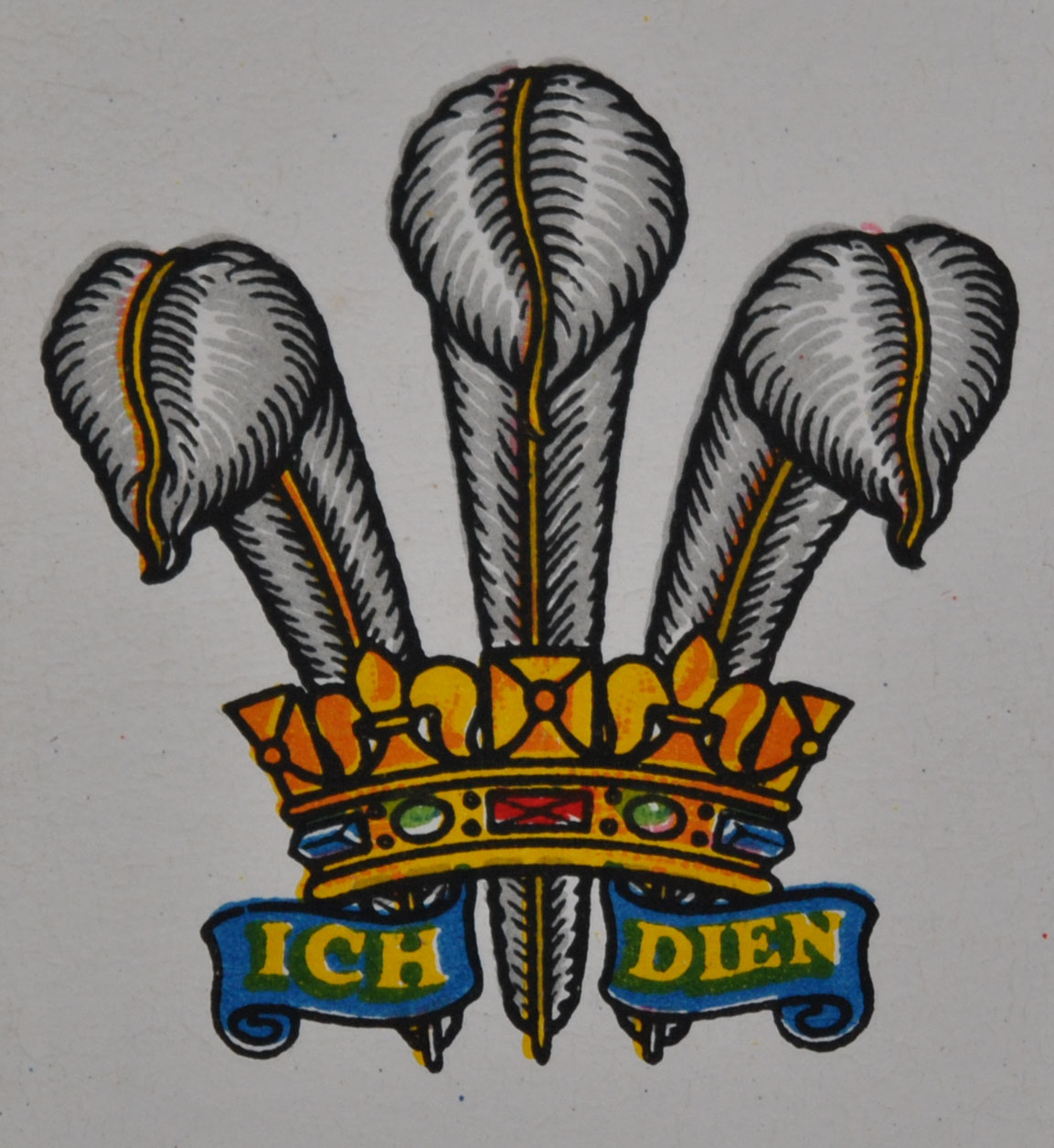
The Prince of Wales's feathers formation badge of the 53rd (Welsh) Division in the First World War

The Welsh Division moved to Northampton at the end of August 1914, where on 18 November it was warned for service in British India, but this was subsequently cancelled. Training was interrupted by periods spent digging trenches for the East Coast defences. In December the division moved to Cambridge, then to Bedford in May 1915, where it was numbered as the 53rd (Welsh) Division, and the North Wales Brigade became the 158th (North Wales) Brigade. By July the battalion was at Higham Ferrers in Northamptonshire. On 2 July the division was ordered to refit for service in the Mediterranean. The first battalions to move were the 1/5th and 1/6th RWF, who entrained at Irchester for Devonport during the night of 13 July. The two battalions embarked on the Caledonia and sailed on 14 July.

==== Gallipoli ====
The transports sailed via Gibraltar, Malta, Alexandria and Lemnos, and the 1/5th Bn arrived at Mudros on 28 July, where it disembarked and went into bivouacs. It re-embarked on the Rowan for Imbros on 8 August. Next day the division took part in the Landing at Suvla Bay, an attempt to break the Trench warfare deadlock in the Gallipoli Campaign. The battalion landed at 'C' Beach at 06.00 and bivouacked at Lala Baba, apart from A Company, which was detailed to carry equipment up to the front line.

158th Brigade supported 159th (Cheshire) Brigade in an attack towards Scimitar Hill on 10 August and 1/5th RWF as the brigade's leading battalion moved forward at 04.45. The officers had no maps and confusion reigned, but the battalion advanced across the Salt Lake under heavy shrapnel and rifle fire, passing through the retreating battalions of 159th Bde at 11.30. 'Gallantly led' by Lt-Col Phillips, the battalion penetrated to within a few hundred yards of Scimitar Hill before getting broken up into small parties in the scrub. They took cover and opened fire on the Turkish front line at a range of 200 yards (180 m). Phillips sent back a message urging the 1/6th RWF to come up and help complete the job, but he was killed soon afterwards. The battalion was later withdrawn to 160th (South Wales) Bde's line; further attempts to take Scimitar Hill during the afternoon all failed. The battalion's casualties were 6 officers and 13 other ranks (ORs) killed, 6 officers and 116 ORs wounded, and 39 missing, though many reported missing straggled back later.

The corps commander, Lt-Gen Sir Frederick Stopford, had lost confidence in 53rd (W) Division, and would not use it in the subsequent phases of the battle. Over the following days the battalion was engaged in reorganising and improving the trenches facing Scimitar Hill, taking casualties from Turkish rifle fire. It also had 160 sick men evacuated to hospital by the end of the month, another 180 by the end of September.

In October the 1/5th Bn's strength had been reduced to 18 officers and 355 ORs and it was temporarily amalgamated with the 1/6th Bn, under the command of Lt-Col Rome of 1/6th Bn. Turkish artillery became more active during November, adding to the toll of casualties from trench-holding, the trenches were flooded, and later there was a blizzard. So many men were evacuated suffering from frostbite and exposure that only 88 ORs remained in the line. The effective strength of 53rd (W) Division was very low and it was decided to evacuate the remnants. On 12 December the battalion moved to 'C' Beach to embark on the El Kahirah to Mudros. The division was then shipped to Alexandria, where it landed between 20 and 23 December.

==== Egypt ====
On arrival in Egypt the division went by rail to Wardan to recuperate. In mid-February 1916 158th Bde was sent to guard the water supplies at Wadi Natrun, where reinforcement drafts were absorbed and training was carried out. In May the brigade moved to Zeitoun, Cairo, where it rejoined the rest of 53rd (W) Division in the Suez Canal defences. By July 158th Bde was near Moascar, digging defences, but when it became clear that the Turks were crossing the Sinai Desert to attack the canal line, the brigade was sent by train and route march to Romani to reinforce 52nd (Lowland) Division in No 3 Section of the Canal Defences, arriving on 21 July. 1/5th Royal Welch Fusiliers were attached to 156th (Scottish Rifles) Brigade in reserve at Romani Station. The Turks attacked on 4 August (the Battle of Romani) and 1/5th RWF was ordered up at midday. However, the attack was virtually over by then. The following morning 8th Bn Cameronians (Scottish Rifles) advanced with the bayonet, D Company 1/5th RWF in support, and the Turks in front began to surrender while those behind were in full retreat.

==== Gaza ====
158th Brigade returned to the canal on 14 August and spent the next three months at Ferdan. By the end of the year it was back at Romani, the Egyptian Expeditionary Force (EEF) having cleared Sinai of the enemy. On 20 January 1917 53rd (W) Division began the march across the Sinai Desert, reaching Wadi el Arish at the end of the month. It moved up to Rafah on 21 March. After an approach march beginning on 24 March, the EEF attacked Gaza on 26 March, launching the First Battle of Gaza. 53rd (W) Division in the Desert Column was ordered to cross the Wadi Ghuzze towards Gaza itself, masked by the mounted divisions sweeping round the flank. The division was led by 160th Bde, followed by 158th, 1/5th RFW leading. The battalion's guide got lost and there was an overnight fog, so 158th Bde was late crossing the wadi that morning, but by 06.30 it reached the edge of the Mansura ridge overlooking the plain of Gaza. At 11.30 the division was hurriedly ordered to attack, even though the artillery had not yet established communications. 158th Brigade set out shortly after 11.45 to attack Ali Muntar, with 1/5th RWF leading, preceded by a strong patrol. The whole advance, watched by the mounted divisions, was 'a model in precision and steadiness'. After leaving the protection of Mansura the battalion immediately came under shrapnel fire as it marched across open ground parallel to the Ali Muntar defences before wheeling left and moved down to a small cactus garden about 800 yards (730 m) from the crest of Ali Muntar. Here Lt-Col Borthwick waited for the other battalions to catch up, and firing became general, with the battalion troubled by enemy fire coming in from Green Hill to the left as well as in front. The brigadier reinforced the battalion with machine guns and sent another battalion to take Green Hill. The whole line then advanced again. About 40 men of 1/5th RWF dashed through the machine gun fire and made a lodgement in the trenches east of Ali Muntar mosque, capturing Turks, Austrians and Germans, and held it fast despite enemy counter-attacks. By 18.30 the whole Ali Muntar position was won, and by nightfall Gaza was almost completely surrounded, with patrols from 53rd (W) Division in the eastern streets linking up with the ANZAC Mounted Division. However, the senior British commanders were unaware of the success, and had already ordered the mounted troops to withdraw to water their horses. 53rd (W) Division was ordered to dig in on a line near Wadi Ghuzze next day; isolated at Green Hill, 1/5th RWF also had to fall back. At the end of the day the whole division was withdrawn across the wadi, 158th Bde arriving at 01.15 on 28 March. The battalion's casualties were 2 officers and 33 ORs killed, 9 officers and 186 ORs wounded, and 9 ORs missing.

Both sides brought up reinforcements and carried out reconnaissances while the EEF prepared for a Second Battle of Gaza. 53rd (W) Division dug a new line well forward on sand dunes along the coast. When the attack was made on 18 April, 158th Bde held this new line, the other brigades passing through and assaulting Samson Ridge with tank support. As the attack developed, 158th Bde moved up in support, but the division was still held up at Samson Ridge at the end of the day, and dug in where it stood.

Trench warfare now set in for the summer, while the EEF was reorganised under new command and intensive training was carried out behind the lines. On 20 October 158th Bde moved up to the concentration area for the new offensive (the Third Battle of Gaza), taking over the front line and reconnoitring the ground over which they were to attack. On 25 October the brigade moved into No man's land and established an outpost line. On 27 October the division advanced to take over a line of hills already occupied by the Yeomanry of the 8th Mounted Brigade, the movement being covered by 1/5th RWF. Later the battalion was sent with a field artillery battery 8 miles (13 km) to occupy Hill 630 on the left. When the battalion was still 4 miles (6.4 km) away the Yeomanry outpost on the hill was overwhelmed by a Turkish attack. The Turks then had perfect observation over the plain where 1/5th RWF was moving up, followed by the rest of 158th Bde and then 160th Bde, and began shelling the concentration of troops. Once the division was re-organised for an attack, the Turks slipped away and the line of hills was easily reoccupied. The main attack, a turning movement (the Battle of Beersheba), began on 31 October; 53rd (W) Division on the left flank was hardly engaged, though part of 158th Bde in 'Smith's Group' made a demonstration with 1/5th RWF advancing to keep touch with the attacking troops to the right. The battalion engaged the enemy with long-range machine gun fire, and ended the day on outpost duty.

After the capture of Beersheba, the EEF thrust into the hills beyond, with 53rd (W) Division marching through Beersheba to occupy a line beyond without any fighting. On 3 November the division advanced into the hills in a series of columns, 1/5th RWF escorting the artillery along a track over relatively flat ground towards Tell el Khuweilfe. Later in the day the battalion was diverted to assist in the attack on the heights (the Battle of Tel el Khuweilfe), which pinned the Turkish reinforcements arriving on the battlefield. On Lt-Col Borthwick's initiative the battalion 'jumped' the lower hills during the night. There was a two-day lull during a sandstorm. Then, after a difficult assembly close up to Tell el Khuewilfe, 158th Brigade carried out a fullscale assault on the position at 04.20 on 6 November, with 1/5th RWF in reserve. 1/6th Battalion pushed over the heights but then got into difficulties as the Turks counterattacked, until a company of 1/5th Bn moved up to support them. Deadlock then set in, but next day the Desert Mounted Corps (DMC) swept round the flank of the pinned enemy. 53rd (W) Division was ordered to stand fast, though 1/5th RWF used rifle grenades to bombard and then rush a troublesome Turkish machine gun and sniper post. But that night the enemy in front pulled out as the entire Turkish army began a headlong retreat.

==== Jerusalem ====
From 10 November 53rd (W) Division remained in the same area, so as not to overload the supply lines for the advancing parts of the EEF. It did not move forward again until early December, and even then limited supplies meant that 158th Bde was left at Beersheba. It was not brought forward until 21 December, by which time the Battle of Jerusalem was over. On 22 December 1/5th RWF was sent forward to take over part of the outpost line under 159th Bde; the path was so steep that the relief was not completed until the following morning. At Christmas the rest of 158th Bde relieved 159th Bde, and 1/5th RWF became the reserve battalion. Late on 26 December the Turks launched a major counter-attack aiming to recapture Jerusalem, and the fighting spread to 53rd (W) Division's front on 27 December, though 158th Bde was hardly engaged, merely supporting 160th Bde on its flank and reoccupying a captured village that was only held by Turkish outposts. As the Turkish attacks faded away, the division went over to the attack itself, 158th Bde attacking the villages and high ground in its front. 1/7th Battalion's attack failed at first, but reinforced by two companies of 1/5th Bn and with renewed artillery support it took its objective at midnight. The brigade took further ground on 28 December. 53rd (W) Division held its line throughout the bad weather of January 1918, with 158th Bde providing working parties to improve the roads for the EEF's next advance, aimed at Jericho. This began on 14 February, supported by 53rd (W) Division, and the town was captured by 22 February.

==== Tell 'Asur ====
In March the EEF began an advance in the Jordan Valley. 53rd (W) Division's next objective was Tell 'Asur, the highest point of Judaea north of Jerusalem, and it had to tackle the most difficult terrain in the whole operation. The division occupied No man's land in the preceding days, then after a heavy bombardment on 9 March the 1/5th RWF captured the hill at about 09.30, despite morning fog. A Turkish counter-attack regained the summit, but 1/6th RWF came up in relief and drove them off it. In the next four hours the Turks launched four more fierce attacks on the hill, but failed to recapture it. During the night 1/6th Bn moved down to take another hill a mile in front, while 1/5th Bn held Tell 'Asur itself. The division completed its objectives by 12 March. 158th Brigade was not engaged in the various raids across the Jordan carried out by the EEF during Spring 1918.

=== 5/6th Battalion ===
In the summer 53rd (Welsh) Division was changed to the Indian Army establishment: only one British battalion was retained in each brigade, the remainder being sent as reinforcements to the Western Front. Initially, 1/5th and 1/6th Bns RWF continued in 158th Bde alongside Gurkha and Indian battalions from June, then on 1 August the two battalions merged to form the 5th/6th Battalion, Royal Welsh Fusiliers under the command of Lt-Col Borthwick of the 1/5th. This continued as the sole British battalion in 158th Bde for the remainder of the campaign.

==== Megiddo ====
At the climactic Battle of Megiddo 53rd (W) Division was tasked with advancing across the Samieh Basin towards Nablus, to threaten the Turks' communication centre and block the exits to the Jordan Valley (the Battle of Nablus). It attacked in moonlight late on the first day (18 September), after a 20-minute bombardment. 158th Brigade was in reserve, but a company of 5th/6th RWF was attached to the leading Indian unit of 160th Bde (17th Infantry (The Loyal Regiment)) and covered the left flank of the advance, occupying Keen's Knoll and Table Hill. Next day 5th/6th RWF relieved 4th/5th Welch Regiment (159th Bde) and secured the plateau in front ready for the advance to continue on 20 September, with Lt-Col Borthwick of 5th/6th RWF commanding the whole operation until the rest of the brigade caught up. Because of difficulties in making a road, 158th Bde was not ready until late on 20 September, but when it advanced at 23.00 it found the Turks had retired. It continued advancing through the night with 5th/6th RWF leading until 05.30 on 21 September when it found the road blocked. The roads were very bad, and the Royal Engineers struggled to make a path for the guns, but the advance continued at 08.30, with 5th/6th RWF picquetting the hills as it went. By the end of the next day the Turkish army was shattered, and its retreat was being harried by artillery and aircraft.

The advanced troops of the division were now south-east of Nablus, but 53rd (W) Division was ordered to stand fast and did not take part in the pursuit of the defeated Turkish army. For the next few days it was employed in clearing the battlefield and repairing the Nablus road. On 26 September it moved back to Tell 'Asur, and by 12 October it had moved to Ramle, where on 27 October it began entraining for Alexandria. The Armistice of Mudros ended the fighting in Palestine on 31 October. On 20 December demobilisation instructions were received and the first parties left for home on 22 December. The Indian battalions left in early 1919 as transport became available, and the British units were reduced to cadres. The last details left for Port Said and shipment home on 15 June. The 5th/6th RWF was officially disembodied on 4 August 1919.

==== Commanding officers ====
The following officers commanded 1/5th and 5th/6th RWF during the war:

- Lt-Col B.S. Phillips, from 15 May 1912, killed 10 August 1915
- Major B. Head from 10 August 1915, killed by sniper 13 August 1915
- Capt F.H. Borthwick, from 13 August 1915
- Lt-Col C.S. Rome,1/6th RWF, from 9 October 1915 (amalgamated battalion)
- Lt-Col F.H. Borthwick, from 28 January 1916 to Armistice
- Maj W. Beswick, acting 23 September–7 November 1916
- Maj T.H. Parry, acting 16 April–1 August 1918

=== 2/5th (Flintshire) Battalion ===
The 2/5th (Flintshire) Bn formed at the RWF's depot at Wrexham on 11 September 1914. It was assigned to 203rd (2nd North Wales) Brigade in 68th (2nd Welsh) Division, which began to assemble at Northampton in April 1915. It replaced the 53rd (W) Division at Bedford in July. Training was made difficult by the lack of arms and equipment, and the need to supply drafts to the 1st Line units. At first the men were issued with obsolete .256-in Japanese Arisaka rifles for training. In July the battalions were reorganised and the Home Service-only men were transferred to Provisional units (47th Provisional Bn, later 23rd Bn RWF, in the case of the RWF's TF battalions). By November the 2nd Line battalions were so weak that their establishment was reduced to 600 men. On 22 November the 2/5th (Flintshire) Bn absorbed the 2/6th (Glamorgan) Bn, Welsh Regiment. Late in 1915 the 68th (2nd W) Division's battalions handed over their Japanese rifles to the provisional battalions and were issued with some old Lee–Enfield rifles converted to charger loading.

68th (2nd Welsh) Division was assigned to Home Defence duties and in November 1915 it joined First Army in Central Force. By September 1916 the division was in General Reserve for Central Force, and in November the 2/5th Bn was at Westleton in Suffolk. By May 1917 the division had transferred to Northern Army (Home Forces), and the battalion was at Henham Park in Halesworth, Suffolk, for its summer station. In October 1917 it moved to Great Yarmouth where it transferred to 204th (2nd Cheshire) Brigade. 2/5th (Flintshire) Bn was disbanded on 16 March 1918 and replaced in 204th Bde by a training unit.

=== 3/5th (Flintshire) Battalion ===
The 3/5th (Flintshire) Bn formed at Flint on 23 March 1915. It was redesignated as 5th (Reserve) (Flintshire) Bn, RWF, on 8 April 1916 and on 1 September 1916 it was absorbed into the 4th (Reserve) (Denbighshire) Bn, RWF, in the Welsh Reserve Bde at Oswestry.

== Interwar ==
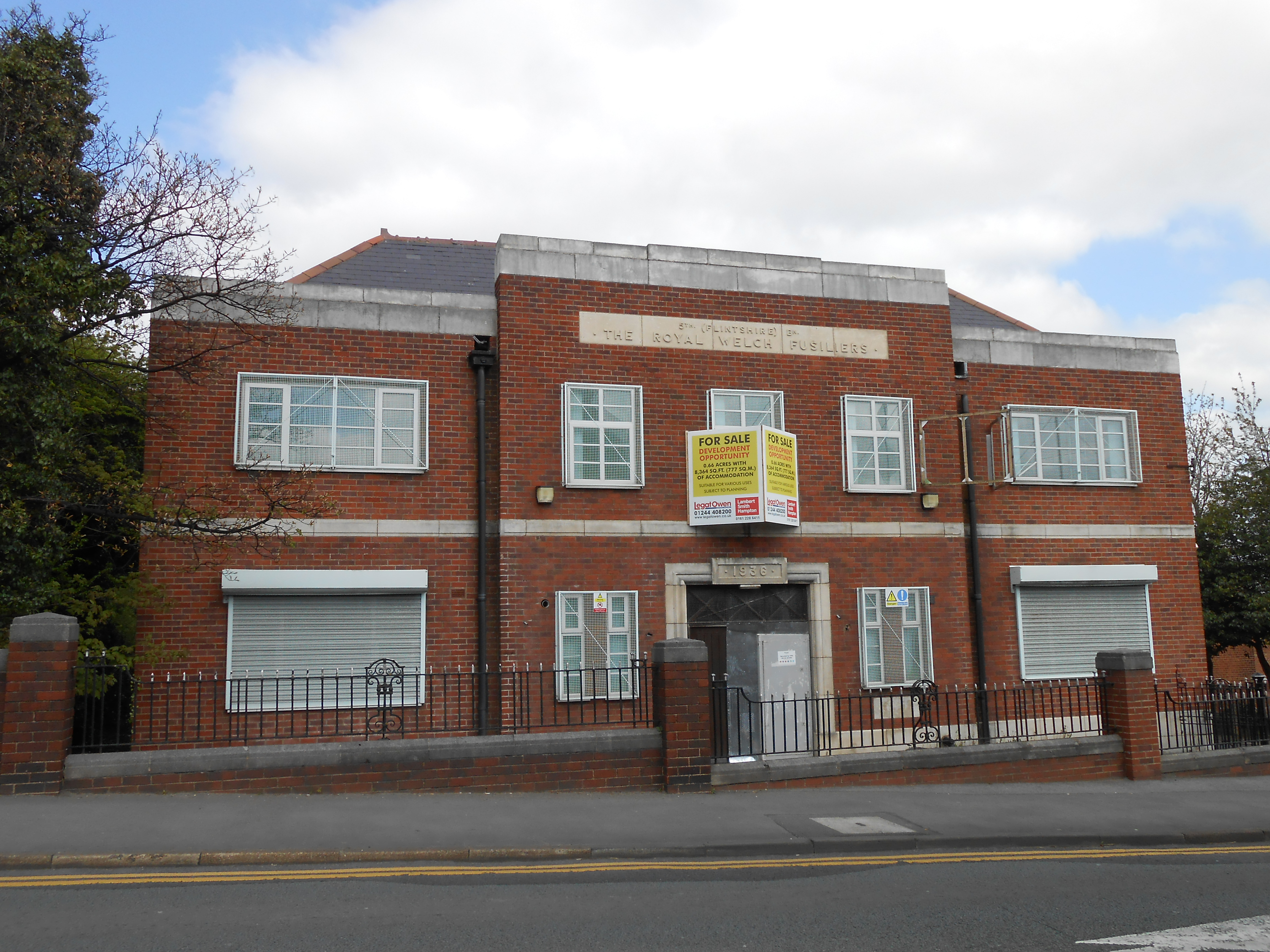
The former drill hall of the 5th (Flintshire) Bn, RWF, at Connah's Quay in 2014.

The TF was reconstituted on 7 February 1920 (reorganising as the Territorial Army (TA) the following year) and both the 5th and 6th RWF were reformed. 5th (Flintshire) Bn established its HQ at the Drill Hall, Rhyl, with a cadet battalion attached. It formed part of 158th (Royal Welch) Bde in 53rd (Welsh) Division. A new drill hall for the Connah's Quay detachment was built in 1936.

=== Anti-tank conversion ===
By the late 1930s a need for specialist anti-tank (A/T) artillery had been recognised, and the battalion was one of the first batch of TA units converted to the new role, on 16 November 1938 as 60th (Royal Welch Fusiliers) Anti-Tank Regiment, Royal Artillery, with the following organisation:

- Regimental HQ (RHQ) at Flint
- 237 A/T Battery at Flint
- 238 A/T Battery at Connah's Quay
- 239 A/T Battery at Mold
- 240 A/T Battery at Drill Hall, Rhyl

With the expansion of the TA after the Munich Crisis, the regiment quickly formed a duplicate unit, 70th Anti-Tank Regiment at Mold, with 277, 278, 279 and 280 A/T Btys.

The establishment of an A/T battery at this time was 12 x 2-pounder guns organised in Troops of four guns.

== Second World War ==
=== 60th (RWF) Anti-Tank Regiment, RA ===
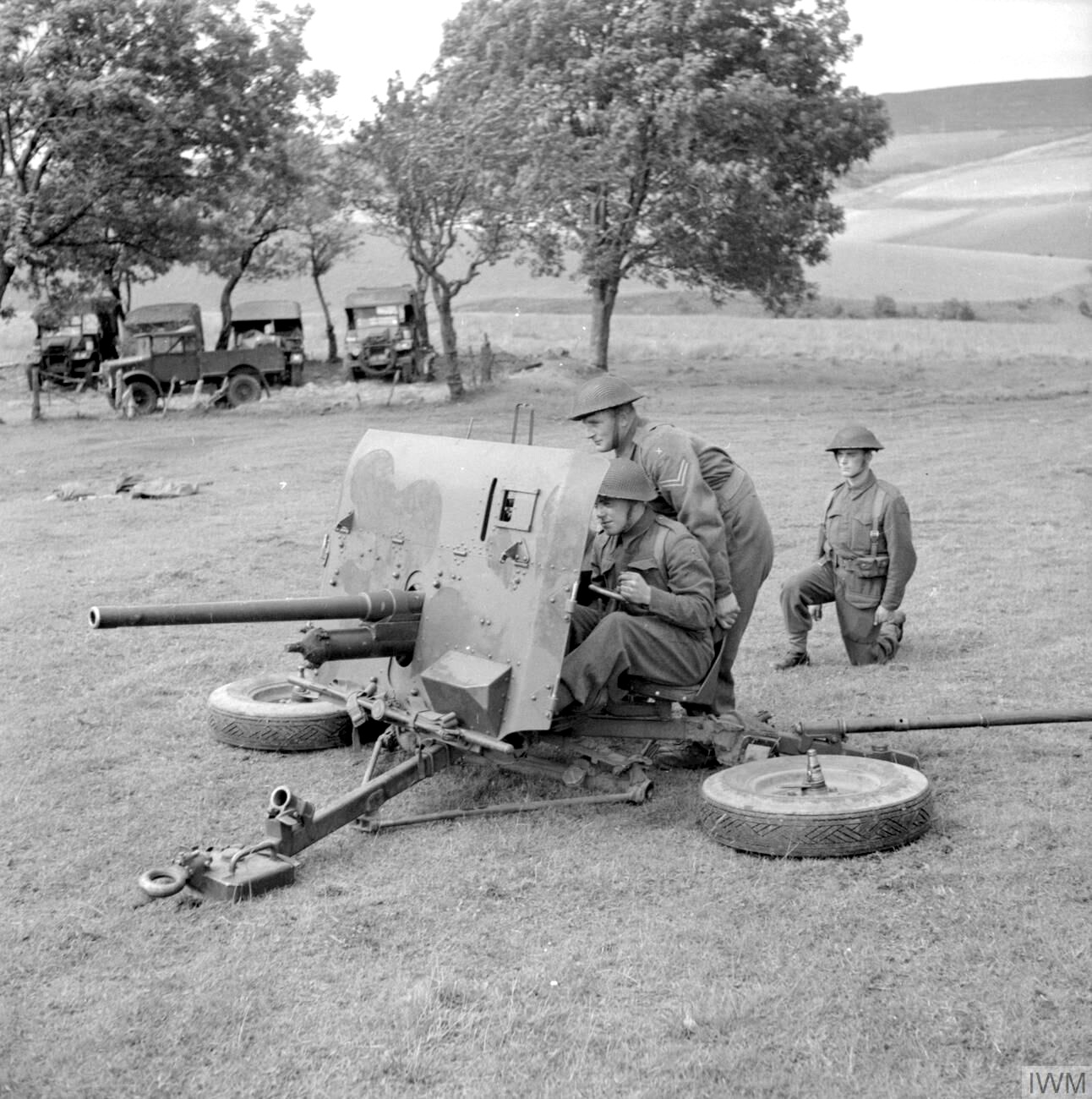
2-Pounder A/T gun in the UK.

When war broke out on 3 September 1939 60th (RWF) Regiment was the anti-tank component of 53rd (Welsh) Division, but on 22 December it was assigned to 1st Support Group (1st Sp Gp) in 1st Armoured Division, which was preparing to join the British Expeditionary Force in France.

=== 101st Light Anti-Aircraft/Anti-Tank Regiment, RA ===
On 14 February 1940, Regimental HQ (RHQ) of 60th (RWF) A/T Rgt was converted into 101st Light Anti-Aircraft/Anti-Tank Regiment, consisting of 237 and 239 A/T Btys and two light anti-aircraft (LAA) batteries, 43 from 11th (City of London Yeomanry) LAA Rgt and 44 from 12th (Finsbury Rifles) LAA Rgt. This composite unit, the first of its kind, provided the bulk of 1st Sp Gp, the other artillery units having already gone to France.

==== Battle of France ====
1st Armoured Division was ordered to France on 11 May after the German invasion of the Low Countries ended the Phoney War. It began landing at Cherbourg Naval Base and Le Havre on 15 May and was immediately ordered to advance and hold the crossings over the River Somme. 101st LAA/AT Regiment, with 20 x 2-pounder A/T guns and 96 Lewis guns as AA light machine guns (the LAA batteries' Bofors 40 mm guns not having arrived) was ordered to seize the crossings over the Seine and hold them until the armour arrived to push on to the Somme (the infantry of 1st Sp Gp had been diverted to the defence of Calais and were not available). Brigadier Archibald Beauman, who had been put in charge of the scattered mobile forces south of the Somme ('Beauforce'), recovered 10 Bofors guns from various abandoned airfields, and these were given to 44 LAA Bty.

The division's 2nd Armoured Brigade and Beauforce got within four miles of the Somme by 01.00 on 24 May, but then began to meet opposition and mines. Attempts by 1st Armoured and 51st (Highland) Division under French command to break through to the encircled BEF at Dunkirk led to fighting round Abbeville on 27–28 May and were unsuccessful. By early June the BEF had been evacuated, but fighting continued. On 4 June 1 Sp Gp provided flank protection for another attempt by 51st (H) Division to destroy the German bridgeheads at Abbeville, but the Germans had had two weeks to dig in, and the attack failed. Next day the Germans renewed their offensive, surrounding and capturing 51st (H) Division at St Valery-en-Caux, while 1st Sp Gp was 'out on a limb' facing German Panzer divisions and was driven back across the Seine. An operation to evacuate the considerable numbers of British forces left in France from the western ports (Operation Aerial) began. The survivors of 1st Sp Gp were shipped out of Cherbourg on 16 June.

After returning to the UK, the remnants of 1st Armoured Division were stationed in Surrey in VII Corps, as part of the mobile reserve to defend against the feared German invasion (Operation Sealion). The division was one of the first in line for re-equipping.

=== 76th (Royal Welch Fusiliers) Anti-Tank Regiment, RA ===
While it refitted in the UK, 1st Sp Gp was reorganised again, with 101st LAA/AT Rgt broken up at Godalming on 1 November to form 76th (Royal Welch Fusiliers) A/T Rgt and 61st LAA Rgt. 76th A/T Regiment formed a new C Battery from a cadre of experienced officers and gunners supplied by 237 and 239 Btys and a draft of 136 infantry machine gunners (C Battery was redesignated 310 A/T Bty on 24 June 1942).

==== Western Desert ====
1st Armoured Division's formation sign.

After completing its refitting and training in the UK, 1st Armoured Division sailed for the Middle East, 1st Sp Gp leaving on 27 September 1941, arriving in Egypt on 5 December and shortly afterwards moving up into Libya to join Eighth Army's Operation Crusader. 1st Armoured Division was committed to battle piecemeal before it had time to prepare for desert warfare; 1st Sp Gp found itself operating in appalling hummocky country, and many of its vehicles were not desert-worthy. At first, 76th A/T Rgt was sent up to the front with 2nd Armd Bde, but then reverted to 1st Sp Gp which relieved 7th Sp Gp with the experienced 7th Armoured Division on 19 January. General Erwin Rommel's counter-attack on 21 January broke through Eighth Army's screen, 1st Sp Gp finding itself in difficulties in the bad country and under attack by Junkers Ju 87 Stuka divebombers. Only by withdrawal did 1st Armd Division escape destruction.

Eighth Army retired to defensive positions at Gazala, consisting of a series of fortified 'boxes', each defended by a brigade group, with the armoured divisions deployed behind for counter-attack. There was then a pause while both sides trained and re-equipped for the next phase. Some of the new 6-pounder A/T guns began to arrive for the British, but most batteries continued to be equipped with the outclassed 2-pdr. From March until December 1942, 239 A/T Bty was attached to 11th Regiment, Royal Horse Artillery (Honourable Artillery Company), the mobile field artillery regiment working with 2nd Armd Bde.

Rommel attacked the Gazala Line on 27 May, swinging round the two southern boxes. 1st Armoured Division, positioned behind the line, was ordered south. The division's 22nd Armd Bde was ambushed and retired into the 'Knightsbridge' box, while 2nd Armd Bde attacked the German flank from the east; both brigades delivered some sharp blows to the enemy as they followed up. On 29 May the two brigades were involved in a violent tank and artillery action in a sandstorm. Over the following days the division was involved in fierce tank battles in what became known as the Battle of the Cauldron. 22nd Armoured Brigade was badly mauled on 5 June, while 2nd Armd Bde Group with 11th (HAC) RHA and attached units had been sent to reinforce 7th Armd Division. Once Rommel had reduced the southernmost box at Bir Hakeim, stubbornly defended until 10 June by the 1st Free French Brigade, he resumed his advance. On 12 June Eighth Army made a fresh attempt to move its armoured brigades south to attack the enemy, but although 2nd Armd Bde achieved its objective, the day was costly for the British. Next day 2nd and 22nd Armd Bdes held onto their positions east of Knightsbridge, but that night some of the remaining boxes had to be evacuated.

By 14 June Eighth Army began to withdraw to the Egyptian frontier with 1st Armd Division supporting 2nd South African Division in a rearguard action. The South African division was trapped in Tobruk and captured, but 1st Armd Division made it back to the desert south of Mersa Matruh inside Egypt (2nd Armd Bde had been completely withdrawn from the battle). But the Axis forces renewed their attacks on 27 June and Eighth Army Eighth Army was forced to retreat to its fall-back defences at El Alamein.

Once behind the Alamein defences the exhausted armoured divisions were withdrawn into reserve. On 30 June Rommel closed up to the Alamein defences and decided on an immediate attack (the Battle of Ruweisat). 1st Armoured Division was sent up to counter-attack, hindered by shortage of petrol and soft sand, but 18th Indian Infantry Brigade held out at Deir el Shein on 1 July and dislocated the enemy attack, allowing 1st Armoured to launch its counter-attack south of the Ruweisat Ridge on 2 July. The disorganised fighting continued until 5 July when Rommel paused his advance, and Eighth Army began to counter-attack in the north. By 21 July Eighth Army was ready to launch its own attack, with 1st Armd thrown in on 26 July to support the attack. However, both sides were now exhausted and there was a lull in the fighting. 1st Armoured Division was not engaged in the Battle of Alam el Halfa, when the Axis forces were decisively stopped.

==== Alamein ====
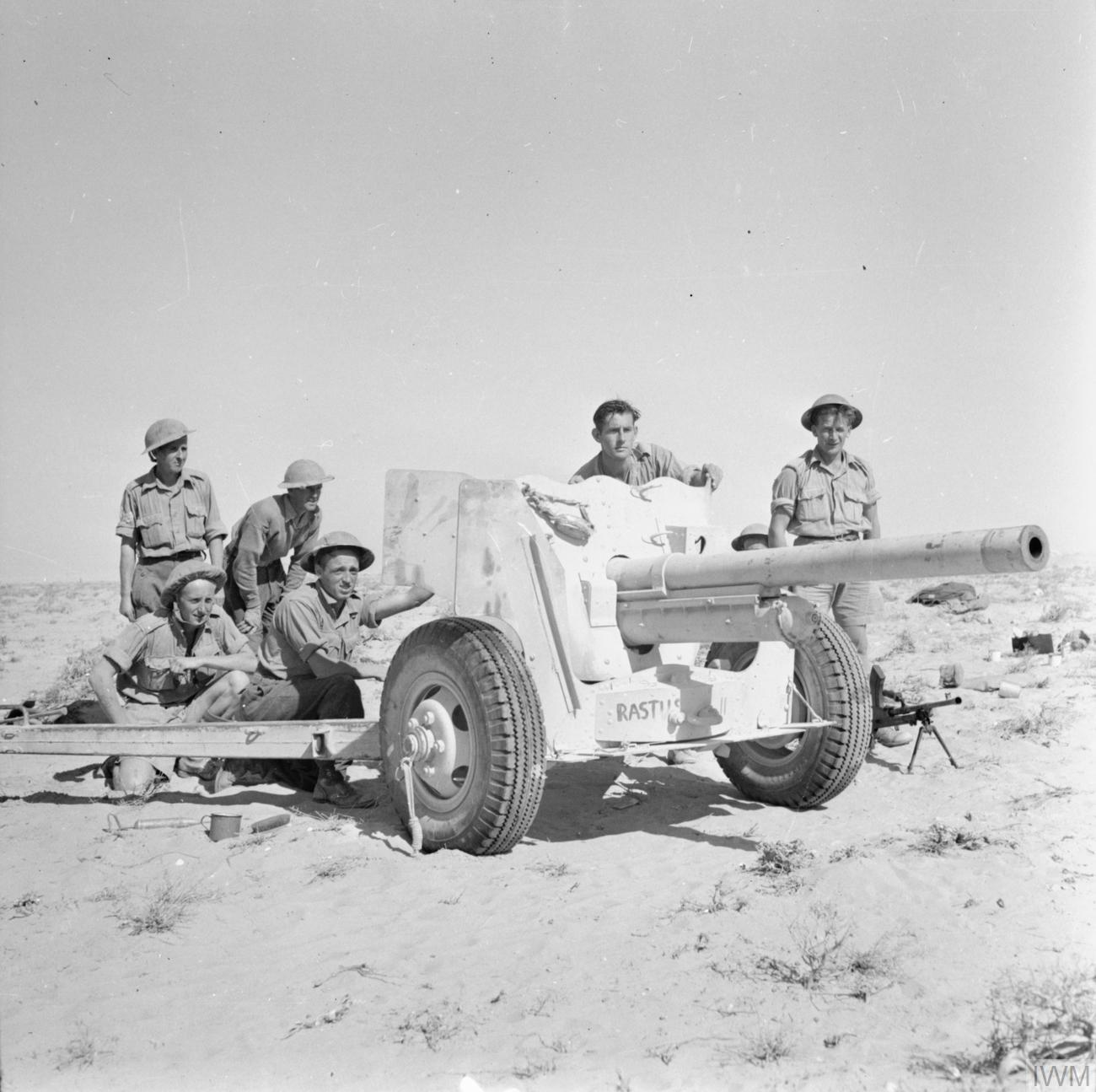
6-pounder A/T gun and crew in the Western Desert, 1942.

Eighth Army, now under the leadership of Gen Bernard Montgomery, prepared carefully for its next offensive. 76th (RWF) Anti-Tank Rgt was out of the line during August, but on 8 September it was joined by ZZ A/T Bty, which had been formed within 1st Regiment Royal Horse Artillery. The regiment was back in the line with 1st Armd Division in time for the Second Battle of El Alamein. It was by now fully equipped with 64 x 6-pdrs; 239 A/T Bty was still attached to 11th (HAC) RHA, (whose batteries were now equipped with M7 Priest self-propelled guns).

The division's role in the first phase (Operation Lightfoot) of the forthcoming battle under X Corps was to follow the advancing infantry during the night of 23/24 October, cutting corridors through the Axis minefield defences, and then deploy behind an anti-tank screen before attacking the enemy positions in daylight. In the event, only two tank squadrons got through the single corridor that 1st Armd achieved that night, and work continued during the day. On 25 and 26 October the division made little progress against the enemy anti-tank defences but held off several Axis counter-attacks during the phase of battle dubbed 'the dog-fight' by Montgomery.

During the night of 26/27 October the 2nd King's Royal Rifle Corps and 2nd Rifle Brigade of 1st Armd Division's 7th Motor Bde seized two strongpoints codenamed 'Woodcock' and 'Snipe'. Next day they dug in while a confused armoured battle continued. On Snipe the 13 6-pdr A/T guns of 2nd Rifle Brigade were reinforced by six more from 239 A/T Bty, and together stood their ground when Rommel's main counter-attack fell on their position at 16.00. Against the waves of attacking tanks the A/T guns 'did great execution, particularly among enemy tanks advancing against the 24th Armoured Brigade. More than once it seemed that the Battalion must be overrun. Coolness and courage averted this fate and led, instead, to the decisive defeat of the enemy at this important point'. (Note: The CO of 2nd Rifle Brigade, Lt-Col Victor Buller Turner, was awarded a Victoria Cross for his gallantry in this action, in which he joined one of the 6-pdr crews as a loader.)

The break-out phase of the battle was codenamed Operation Supercharge. For 1st Armd Division this was a repeat of Lightfoot, with a night crossing of a minefield on 1/2 November, followed by an armoured battle on the far side, in which the Axis tank strength was badly depleted. The breakthrough came on 4 November, when 1st Armd Division began a pursuit across the desert that continued through the night of 5/6 November until its fuel ran out. Refuelled, X Corps and 1st Armd Division then led the pursuit as far as the Jebel el Aktar before XXX Corps passed through to fight the Battle of El Agheila.

==== Tunisia ====
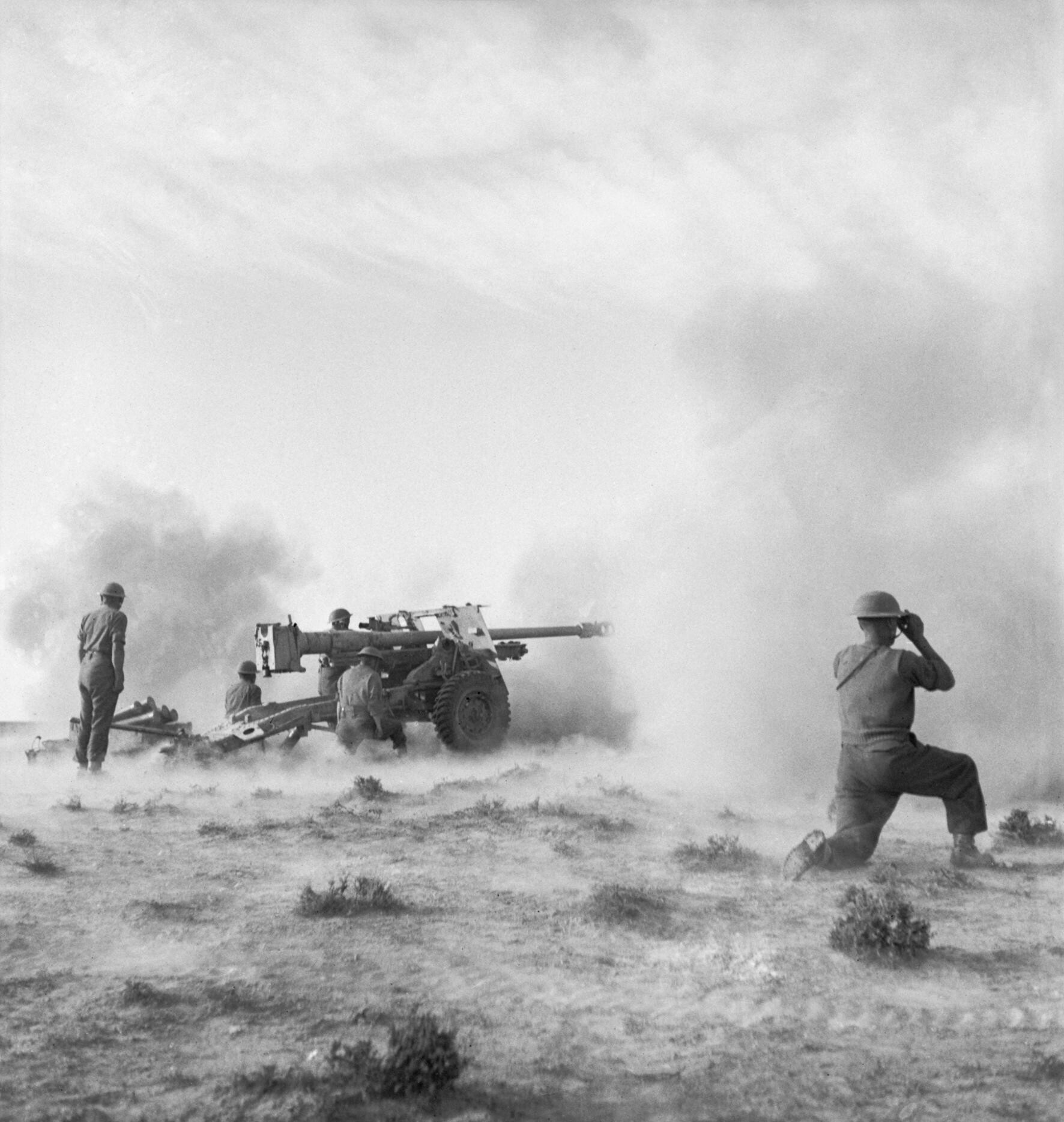
17-Pounder 'Pheasant' A/T gun in action in Tunisia, March 1943.

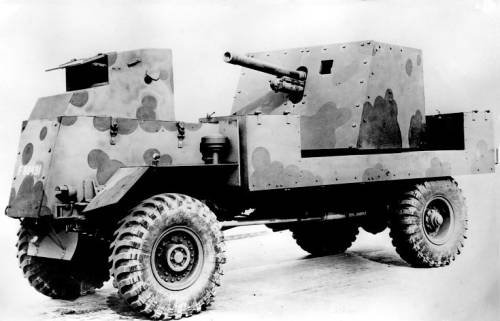
AEC Deacon self-propelled 6-pounder A/T gun.

1st Armoured Division spent the winter of 1942–43 near Benghazi and did not move up to rejoin Eighth Army until 27 February, when it began a 1,300 miles (2,100 km) drive with X Corps to Tripoli, completed by 14 March. By now 76th (RWF) A/T Rgt was equipped with 6-pdrs, new 17-pounders (on the stop-gap Pheasant carriage converted from the 25-pounder gun carriage) and Deacon self-propelled 6-pdrs (in ZZ Bty).

On arrival, 1st Armd Division went into reserve for the Battle of the Mareth Line, beginning on 20/21 March. When XXX Corps' frontal attack was held up, 1st Armd Division was sent with X Corps at 19.30 on 23 March to join New Zealand Corps on a long flanking move, which became 'a first rate tangle' in front of the Tebaga Gap. The defile was blocked by 21st Panzer Division. A new attack (Operation Supercharge II) was quickly planned: on the night of 25/26 March 1st Armd made a fast approach march in moonlight, passed through 2nd New Zealand Division and 8th Armd Bde, which had broken the front line, and went straight into action in the afternoon. With a sandstorm blowing into the enemy's eyes, the division blasted its way through the defile and continued towards El Hamma during the following night. At dawn on 27 March its tanks contacted a hastily organised German anti-tank gun screen and took up hull-down positions. Meanwhile, 15th Panzer Division attempted to attack the rear of the division's column, but it was quickly repulsed by the 17-pdrs of 76th (RWF) A/T Rgt. (It is also reported that the regiment successfully used its Deacons against Panzer IIIs at El Hamma.) There was now a short stalemate, but the Battle of Mareth was over and the enemy were pulling back to their next defensive position at Wadi Akarit. On 29 March 1st Armd Division began probing these defences, and on the evening of 5 April it made a demonstration while 4th Indian Infantry Division seized the heights during the night. Otherwise the division played little part in the Battle of Wadi Akarit.

On 15 April, 1st Armd Division transferred to IX Corps under First Army, which had now linked up with Eighth Army and had better terrain for armoured warfare. 1st Armoured Division moved north to take part in the final assault on Tunis (Operations Vulcan and Strike). The division failed to break through against 10th Panzer Division at El Kourzia on 23 April, but it inflicted unsustainable tank losses on its opponents. The division executed a feint on 5 May to draw attention away from the main thrust towards Tunis, then on 8 May it relieved 7th Armd Division and swung east to Creteville. On 13 May the last Axis troops in Tunisia surrendered.

At the end of the Tunisian campaign 76th (RWF) A/T Rgt was reorganised. On 10 May 1943 239 A/T Bty left again, this time permanently, to help form a new 106th A/T Rgt; it was replaced by a newly formed 199 A/T Bty. 1st Armoured Division remained in North Africa for the next year, missing the early part of the Italian campaign. 76th (RWF) A/T Regiment reverted to its old title of 60th (RWF) Anti-Tank Regiment on 1 April 1944.

==== Italy ====
1st Armoured Division began arriving in Italy in May 1944. In August it concentrated around Altamura in preparation for Operation Olive, the planned assault on the Gothic Line. When the operation began on 25 August, the division was in reserve, ready to lead the exploitation of any breach in the German line. The initial assault went so well that the division was warned on 27 August for its forward move for the Battle of Coriano, and on 31 August it began its difficult approach march along mountain roads. The formation became so spread out that 2nd Armd Bde had to attack the Coriano ridge almost unsupported on 4 September, and failed in its first attempt. A second attempt next day was only partially successful. The attack was renewed on 12 September after heavy artillery and air bombardment of the objective, and the village of Coriano was finally cleared on 14 September. 1st Armoured Division attempted to take the next heights (Point 153 on the Ceriano ridge) on 20 September, and failed with heavy casualties. Nevertheless, Eighth Army had broken the Gothic Line.

British forces in Italy were by now suffering an acute manpower shortage. In September 1944 Gen Harold Alexander decided that 1st Armoured Division would have to be broken up to reinforce other formations, with its divisional troops turned into Army Troops for general employment. 60th (RWF) Anti-Tank Rgt left the division on 26 September and served with Eighth Army through the winter. Eventually, it was placed in suspended animation on 1 April 1945 (some weeks before the end of the war) with 199, 310 and ZZ Btys; 237 A/T Bty survived until it was disbanded on 1 September 1945.

=== 70th (Royal Welch Fusiliers) Anti-Tank Regiment, RA ===
70th A/T Regiment (which was granted the RWF subtitle on 17 February 1942) was in Western Command, assigned to 38th (Welsh) Infantry Division, the 2nd Line duplicate of 53rd (Welsh) Division. The division was still forming when war broke out in 1939 and only assumed full control of its units on 18 September. It remained training in South Wales during the early part of the war, then moved to North West England under III Corps. By May 1941 it was in reserve just behind the invasion-threatened coast of Sussex. However, at the end of the year it was placed on a lower establishment, as a static coast defence formation with no prospect of active service overseas. It spent 1942–44 in various locations in Southern England. By 15 August 1944 most of its personnel had been drafted as reinforcements to 21st Army Group fighting in Normandy, and the divisional HQ ceased to command any units. However, on 1 September the division was recreated in a training role as 38th Infantry (Reserve) Division, and 70th (RWF) immediately rejoined as its A/T regiment until after the end of the war.

== Postwar ==
The TA was reconstituted on 1 January 1947, when 70th (RWF) A/T Rgt was formally disbanded and 60th (RWF) A/T Rgt was reformed at Rhyl as 384 (Royal Welch Fusiliers) Anti-Tank Regiment, RA, providing the divisional A/T component for the reformed 53rd (Welsh) Division. The regiment was reorganised as a Light Regiment, RA, on 1 March 1951.

On 31 October 1956 384 (RWF) Lt Rgt amalgamated with 361 (Carnarvonshire & Denbigh Yeomanry) Medium Rgt as 372 (Flintshire & Denbighshire Yeomanry) Field Rgt. When the TA was reduced into the Territorial and Army Volunteer Reserve (TAVR) in 1967, the regiment became the Flintshire & Denbighshire Yeomanry, RA, with P (Flintshire) Bty at Holywell. It was reduced to a cadre on 1 April 1969, but on 1 April 1971 the cadre was converted to infantry and expanded to form B Company in 3rd (Volunteer) Bn, Royal Welch Fusiliers. This battalion was merged into 2nd Bn, Royal Regiment of Wales, in 1999.

== Honorary Colonels ==
The following served as Honorary Colonel of the 1st Flintshire Rifle Volunteers and its successors:

- Rudolph Feilding, 8th Earl of Denbigh, former CO, appointed 2 July 1873
- Col B.D.G. Cooke, former CO, appointed 26 May 1897
- Col J.S. Roberts, VD, former CO, appointed 15 July 1905
- Lt-Col Sir W. Randle Mainwaring, CB, CBE, former CO of the Denbighshire Yeomanry, appointed 5 September 1936

== Uniforms and Insignia ==
The uniform of the 1st Flintshire RVC was scarlet with green facings, changing to the RWF's blue facings in 1888. In 1925 TA battalions were allowed the battle honours of their parent regiments; in addition the RWF battalions were granted the privilege of wearing the regiment's back flash (five black ribbons below the back of the collar).

When 5th RWF was converted into 60th A/T Rgt it adopted Royal Artillery cap badges but retained the old brass shoulder title of a grenade above the letters RWF, and also retained the black RWF flash below the back collar of the service dress tunic. In 1947, 384 A/T Rgt was authorised to wear the cap badge, buttons and back flash of the RWF, with RA collar badges and shoulder titles.

== Memorials ==
The RWF's regimental memorial for both world wars, a sculpted group by Sir William Goscombe John, stands at the junction of Bodhyfryd and Chester roads in Wrexham. A memorial to the 5th Battalion's casualties during the First World War was unveiled on 13 July 1922 at the Drill Hall in Rhyl.

The battalion's colours, presented in 1909 and subsequently amended to carry the RWF's battle honours, were no longer carried after it was converted to the Royal Artillery; they were finally laid up in St Asaph Cathedral in 1967.

== External sources ==
- British Army units from 1945 on
- Mark Conrad, The British Army, 1914 (archive site)
- Great War Centenary Drill Halls
- Imperial War Museum, War Memorials Register
- The Long, Long Trail
- Orders of Battle at Patriot Files
- Land Forces of Britain, the Empire and Commonwealth – Regiments.org (archive site)
- Royal Artillery 1939–1945
- Royal Welch Fusiliers Museum.
- Graham Watson, The Territorial Army 1947
- “Territorial Force.”
