= Arthur Sandbach =

British Army general officer (1859–1928)

Major-General Arthur Sandbach CB DSO
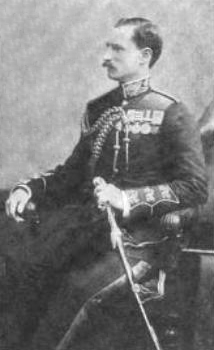
- In The Sketch, 22 January 1902
- Born: 30 July 1859; Llangernyw, Denbighshire, Wales
- Died: 25 June 1928 (aged 68); London, England
- Spouse: Hon. Ina Douglas-Pennant (m. 1902–1928)
- Relatives: Antoinette Sandbach (great-granddaughter)
- Military career
- Allegiance: United Kingdom
- Branch: British Army
- Rank: Major-General
- Nickname: "Minimus"
- Unit: Royal Engineers
- Commands: 59th (2nd North Midland) Division; 68th (2nd Welsh) Division; 1st Sappers and Miners
- Conflicts: Anglo-Egyptian War; Mahdist War; Sikkim Expedition; Hazara Expedition of 1891; Nile Expedition; Second Boer War; First World War
- Awards: Companion of the Order of the Bath; Distinguished Service Order; Mentioned in Despatches

Major-General Arthur Edmund Sandbach, CB, DSO (30 July 1859 – 25 June 1928) was a British Army officer who served in the Royal Engineers and on the General Staff, eventually rising to command the 68th (2nd Welsh) and 59th (2nd North Midland) Divisions during the First World War.

== Early life and education ==
Sandbach was born on 30 July 1859, the third son of Henry Robertson Sandbach of Hafodunos Hall in Denbighshire, a wealthy Anglo-Welsh landowner.

Sandbach was educated at Eton and the Royal Military Academy, Woolwich.

== Early life and military career ==
Following Woolwich, Sandbach was commissioned in the Royal Engineers as a lieutenant on 6 April 1879. He served in the Anglo-Egyptian War of 1882, seeing action at the Battle of Tel-el-Kebir, the 1885 Sudan campaign, the 1886–87 Burmese Expedition, and the Sikkim Expedition of 1888. He was promoted to captain on 1 April 1889, and in 1891 served as the aide-de-camp to Major General William Elles, commanding the Hazara Expedition of 1891. He attended the Staff College, Camberley from 1896–97 and was promoted to major in November 1897, and during the Nile Expedition of 1898 he held the post of assistant adjutant general in the Egyptian army, where he was mentioned in despatches and appointed a brevet lieutenant colonel.

On returning from Egypt at the start of 1899, Sandbach was appointed as the military secretary to the viceroy of India, a post he held until November, when the outbreak of the Second Boer War meant that he was sent to South Africa. He worked on the staff in South Africa as assistant adjutant general, for which he was later awarded the Distinguished Service Order (DSO) as well as a second mention in despatches.

In 1904, he returned again to India where he was appointed to command the 1st Sappers and Miners, the senior Indian engineer regiment. Accordingly, he was promoted to the brevet rank of colonel in February 1904, and the substantive rank of lieutenant colonel in April 1905. In 1907 he relinquished command of the 1st Sappers and returned to England, where he was appointed Officer Commanding Royal Engineers at Aldershot and took the (partly honorary) position as chairman of a Territorial Force (TF) county association. In 1910, he transferred to Irish Command as its chief engineer. In this post, he was given a substantive promotion to colonel in April, following which he was placed on the half-pay list, which lasted until October, whereupon he was made a temporary brigadier general. He was also made a Companion of the Order of the Bath in June of that year.

== First World War ==
Sandbach was still holding his post at Irish Command on the outbreak of the First World War in August 1914. While he officially remained chief engineer in Ireland until 5 October, he was in fact appointed to accompany the British Expeditionary Force (BEF) to France, as the commander, Royal Engineers in II Corps. He was promoted to major general in October 1914, "for distinguished service in the field", and with the expansion of the BEF in early 1915, he was appointed as chief engineer of the Second Army, but was recalled in April 1915 to act as the temporary inspector of Royal Engineers.

In November 1915, Sandbach was appointed to command the 68th (2nd Welsh) Division, a second-line Territorial Force (TF) formation on home defence duties in England. He handed over command in February 1916 on his transfer to the 59th (2nd North Midland) Division, another TF formation. The 59th was the "mobile division" in the Home Army, held in readiness to combat a landing along the East Coast; when the Easter Rising broke out in Dublin on 24 April 1916, it was ordered into immediate readiness and despatched to Ireland. Here, units of the division – many with only a few weeks' training – were hastily thrown into combat, some suffering many casualties; the 2/7th and 2/8th Sherwood Foresters lost over two hundred men killed or wounded at Mount Street on 26 April and at the South Dublin Union on 27 April. After the end of fighting in Dublin, the 59th moved to the Curragh for further training, and was returned to England at the end of the year.

In February 1917, the 59th Division was ordered to the Western Front, despite concerns that its training schedule had been disrupted by service in Ireland. It was deployed during the advance to the Hindenburg Line in March–April 1917, where it suffered unexpectedly high losses. Sandbach was relieved of command on 10 April, felt by his superiors to be too old for command of a front-line division. He was not given a further service appointment.

== After the war ==
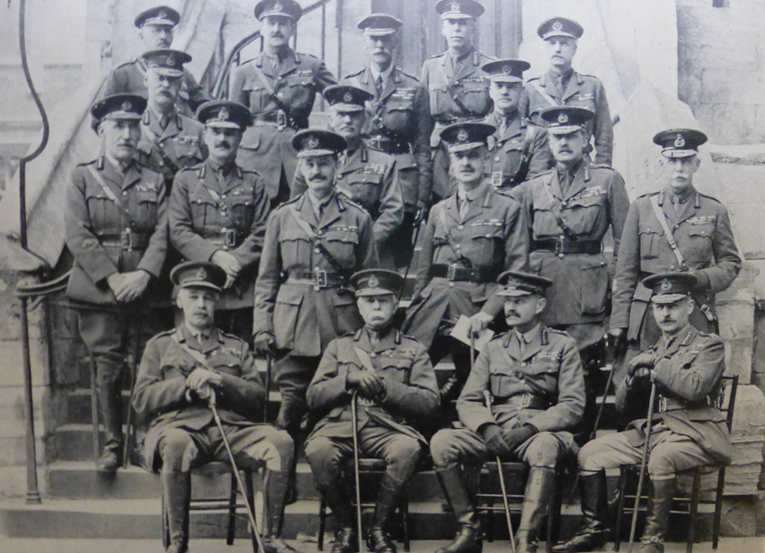
Eighteen Old Etonian generals revisit Eton, May 1919. Major General Sandbach is in the back row on the extreme right.

Sandbach retired from the army in August 1919. Following the war, Sandbach was appointed as a justice of the peace in Montgomeryshire, where he lived, and in 1919 served as the county's High Sheriff.

== Personal life ==
In 1902, Sandbach married the Hon. Ina Douglas-Pennant OBE (1867–1942), a daughter of George Douglas-Pennant, 2nd Baron Penrhyn. She was appointed an Officer of the Order of the British Empire in the 1918 Birthday Honours as President of the Montgomeryshire Branch, British Red Cross Society, during the First World War.

They had one daughter, Geraldine Pamela Violet Sandbach (1909–2001), who in 1932 married Graham Lawrie Mackeson, brother of Sir Harry Ripley Mackeson, 1st Baronet. They adopted the name and arms of Sandbach by royal license in 1933. They had three children: fraternal twins Ian (1933–2012) and Rosemary (1933–2018); and Aurial, Marchioness of Linlithgow (born 1943; third wife of 4th Marquess of Linlithgow). Politician Antoinette Sandbach is his great-granddaughter.

He died in 1928, age 68, at 57 Manchester Street, Marylebone.

Military offices
Preceded by Rowland Mainwaring	GOC 68th (2nd Welsh) Division; 1915–1916	Succeeded by Raymond Reade
Preceded by Raymond Reade	GOC 59th (2nd North Midland) Division; 1916–1917	Succeeded by Cecil Romer
