= Rowland Mainwaring =

British Army officer

Major-General Rowland Mainwaring CMG
- Born: 11 September 1850; Whitmore, Staffordshire, England
- Died: 22 November 1926 (aged 76)
- Military career
- Allegiance: United Kingdom
- Branch: British Army
- Rank: Major-General
- Commands: 2nd Battalion, Royal Welch Fusiliers; 23rd Regimental District; 68th (2nd Welsh) Division
- Conflicts: Third Anglo-Ashanti War; Third Anglo-Burmese War; Bhanio Mogoumg expedition Hazara expedition Second Boer War; First World War
- Awards: Companion of the Order of St Michael and St George

Major-General Rowland Broughton Mainwaring CMG (11 September 1850 – 22 November 1926) was a senior British Army officer.

== Military career ==
Educated at Marlborough College, Mainwaring was commissioned into the 23rd Regiment of Foot on 30 January 1878. He saw action in the Third Anglo-Ashanti War in 1873, the Third Anglo-Burmese War in 1885 and the Bhanio Mogoumg expedition in 1886 as well as the Hazara expedition in 1891. He became commanding officer of the 2nd Battalion Royal Welch Fusiliers, which he commanded in Crete, for which service he was appointed a Companion of the Order of St Michael and St George, and then took part in the Second Boer War in 1899. He went on to serve as commander of the 23rd Regimental District from 1900 to 1906 and as General Officer Commanding 68th (2nd Welsh) Division from January 1915 to November 1915.

== Works ==
- Mainwaring, Rowland Broughton (1889). Historical Record of the Royal Welch Fusiliers, Late the Twenty-third Regiment: Or, Royal Welsh Fusiliers (the Prince of Wales's Own Royal Regiment of Welsh Fuzeliers) Containing an Account of the Formation of the Regiment in 1689, and of Its Subsequent Services to 1889. Hatchards.

Military offices
New title	GOC 68th (2nd Welsh) Division; 1914−1916	Succeeded by Arthur Sandbach
