= 68th (2nd Welsh) Division =

2nd Welsh Division 68th (2nd Welsh) Division 68th Division
- Active: 23 January 1915–17 March 1919
- Country: United Kingdom
- Branch: British Army
- Type: Infantry
- Size: Division
- Service: First World War

Commanders
- Notable commanders: Major-General A.E. Sandbach; Major-General R.N.R. Reade

The 2nd Welsh Division was a 2nd Line Territorial Force division of the British Army in the First World War. The division was formed as a duplicate of the 53rd (Welsh) Division in January 1915. As the name suggests, the division recruited in Wales, but also included units from Cheshire and Herefordshire in England. In August 1915, in common with all Territorial Force divisions, it was numbered as 68th (2nd Welsh) Division. During the winter of 1917–18, the division was extensively reorganized and lost its territorial identity; henceforth it was known as 68th Division.

It served on home defence duties throughout the war, whilst recruiting, training and supplying drafts to overseas units and formations. It was stationed for most of the war in East Anglia, particularly in Norfolk and Suffolk and never left the UK. It was eventually disbanded in March 1919.

== History ==
In accordance with the Territorial and Reserve Forces Act 1907 (7 Edw.7, c.9) which brought the Territorial Force into being, the TF was intended to be a home defence force for service during wartime and members could not be compelled to serve outside the country. However, on the outbreak of war on 4 August 1914, many members volunteered for Imperial Service. Therefore, TF units were split into 1st Line (liable for overseas service) and 2nd Line (home service for those unable or unwilling to serve overseas) units. 2nd Line units performed the home defence role, although in fact most of these were also posted abroad in due course.

On 15 August 1915, TF units were instructed to separate home service men from those who had volunteered for overseas service (1st Line), with the home service personnel to be formed into reserve units (2nd Line). On 31 August, 2nd Line units were authorized for each 1st Line unit where more than 60% of men had volunteered for overseas service. After being organized, armed and clothed, the 2nd Line units were gradually grouped into large formations thereby forming the 2nd Line divisions. These 2nd Line units and formations had the same name and structure as their 1st Line parents. On 24 November, it was decided to replace imperial service (1st Line) formations as they proceeded overseas with their reserve (2nd Line) formations. A second reserve (3rd Line) unit was then formed at the peace headquarters of the 1st Line.

As a result, the 2nd Welsh Division was formed in January 1915 with the 2nd North Wales, 2nd Cheshire and 2nd Welsh Border Brigades as a 2nd Line duplicate of the Welsh Division.

== Order of battle ==
=== Organisation, November 1915 ===
Organisation in November 1915 after reorganization when all 2nd Line formations became liable for overseas service.

203rd (2nd North Wales) Brigade

2/4th (Denbighshire) Battalion, Royal Welch Fusiliers
2/5th (Flintshire) Battalion, Royal Welch Fusiliers
2/6th (Carnarvonshire & Anglesey) Battalion, Royal Welch Fusiliers
2/7th (Merionethshire & Montgomeryshire) Battalion, Royal Welch Fusiliers

Royal Field Artillery

2/I Welsh (Howitzer) Brigade

2/1st Glamorganshire (H) Battery
2/2nd Glamorganshire (H) Battery
2/I Welsh (H) Brigade Ammunition Column

2/II Welsh Brigade

2/3rd Glamorganshire Battery
2/4th Glamorganshire Battery
2/1st Cardigan Battery
2/II Welsh Brigade Ammunition Column

2/I Cheshire Brigade

2/1st Cheshire Battery
2/2nd Cheshire Battery
2/3rd Cheshire Battery
2/I Cheshire Brigade Ammunition Column

1/IV Welsh Brigade

2/1st Monmouth Battery
2/2nd Monmouth Battery
2/3rd Monmouth Battery
1/IV Welsh Brigade Ammunition Column

2/1st Welsh Divisional Ammunition Column

Royal Garrison Artillery

1/1st Welsh (Carnarvonshire) Heavy Battery and Ammunition Column
2/1st Welsh (Carnarvonshire) Heavy Battery and Ammunition Column

Divisional troops

68th (2/1st Welsh) Divisional Cyclist Company

Royal Engineers

3/1st Cheshire Field Company
1/1st Glamorgan Field Company
2/1st Glamorgan Field Company
68th (2/1st Welsh) Divisional Signal Company

Royal Army Medical Corps

2/1st Welsh Field Ambulance
2/2nd Welsh Field Ambulance
2/3rd Welsh Field Ambulance

68th (2/1st Welsh) Divisional Train, ASC

549th Company
550th Company
551st Company
552nd Company

204th (2nd Cheshire) Brigade

2/4th Battalion, Cheshire Regiment
2/5th (Earl of Chester's) Battalion, Cheshire Regiment
2/6th Battalion, Cheshire Regiment
2/7th Battalion, Cheshire Regiment

205th (2nd Welsh Border) Brigade

2/1st Battalion, Monmouthshire Regiment
2/2nd Battalion, Monmouthshire Regiment
2/3rd Battalion, Monmouthshire Regiment
2/1st Battalion, Herefordshire Regiment

== Commanders ==
The 68th (2nd Welsh) Division had the following commanders:

From	Rank	Name
23 January 1915	Brigadier-General	R.B. Mainwaring
15 November 1915	Major-General	A.E. Sandbach
14 February 1916	Major-General	R.N.R. Reade
1 December 1917	Major-General	E.M. Perceval (Note: Major-General E.M. Perceval was commander until 15 April 1919.)

== See also ==
- 53rd (Welsh) Division for the 1st Line formation
- List of British divisions in World War I

== Bibliography ==
- Becke, Archibald F. (1937). Order of Battle of Divisions Part 2B. The 2nd-Line Territorial Force Divisions (57th–69th) with The Home-Service Divisions (71st–73rd) and 74th and 75th Divisions. London: HMSO. OCLC 4405016.
- Farndale, General Sir Martin (1988). The Forgotten Fronts and the Home Base, 1914–18. History of the Royal Regiment of Artillery. Woolwich: The Royal Artillery Institution. ISBN 1-870114-05-1.
- James, Brigadier E.A. (1978). British Regiments 1914–18. London: Samson Books Limited. ISBN 0-906304-03-2.
- Rinaldi, Richard A (2008). Order of Battle of the British Army 1914. Ravi Rikhye. ISBN 978-0-97760728-0.
