= 205th (2nd Welsh Border) Brigade =

The 205th (2nd Welsh Border) Brigade was a formation of the British Army during the First World War. It was raised as a second line brigade, part of the 68th (2nd Welsh) Division, from those men in the Territorial Force who had not agreed to serve overseas. The second line infantry battalions had a minimum strength of 600 men.

== Formation ==
- 2/1st Monmouthshire Regiment. Disbanded 31 March 1918.
- 2/2nd Monmouthshire Regiment. Disbanded 20 April 1918.
- 2/3rd Monmouthshire Regiment. Absorbed into 2/1st and 2/2nd Battalions August 1917.
- 2/1st Herefordshire Regiment. Disbanded 10 September 1917.
- 233rd (Infantry) Battalion, TR. Joined from Training Reserve 23 July 1917. Became 52nd (Graduated) Battalion of the King’s (Liverpool Regiment) on 27 October 1917.
- 234th (Infantry) Battalion, TR. Joined from Training Reserve 23 July 1917. Became 52nd (Graduated) Battalion of the Welsh Regiment on 27 October 1917.
- 51st (Graduated) Battalion of the Royal Warwickshire Regiment. Joined January 1918.
- 52nd (Graduated) Battalion of the Royal Warwickshire Regiment. Joined January 1918.
