= 203rd (2nd North Wales) Brigade =

- Active: 1915- 1918
- Country: United Kingdom
- Branch: British Army
- Type: Infantry Brigade
- Role: Home Defence
- Part of: 68th (2nd Welsh) Division

203rd (2nd North Wales) Brigade was a formation of the British Army during World War I.

== Origin ==
On the outbreak of war in August 1914, the four Territorial Force battalions (4th – 7th) of the Royal Welsh Fusiliers comprised the North Wales Brigade of the Welsh Division. In common with the rest of the Territorial Force, these battalions immediately began forming 'Second Line' duplicate battalions composed of recruits and men enlisted for home service only. In May 1915 the original brigade became 158th (North Wales) Brigade in 53rd (Welsh) Division. Similarly the Second Line brigade became 203rd (2nd North Wales) Brigade in 68th (2nd Welsh) Division.

== Composition ==
On formation, 203rd Bde comprised the following battalions:

- 2/4th (Denbighshire) Battalion, Royal Welch Fusiliers (disbanded March 1918)
- 2/5th (Flintshire) Battalion, Royal Welch Fusiliers (disbanded 16 March 1918)
- 2/6th (Carnarvonshire and Anglesey) Battalion, Royal Welch Fusiliers (disbanded 8 September 1917)
- 2/7th (Merionethshire & Montgomeryshire) Battalion, Royal Welch Fusiliers (disbanded 12 September 1917)

== Service ==
68th Division did not go overseas even after the Military Service Act 1916 made it possible to send second line Territorials to war zones. The division and its components remained as part of the home defences of Britain, training and supplying drafts to other units overseas. The original units dwindled and were eventually disbanded.
