= 6th (Caernarvonshire and Anglesey) Battalion, Royal Welch Fusiliers =

6th (Caernarvonshire & Anglesey) Bn, Royal Welch Fusiliers 635 (Royal Welch) LAA Rgt, RA 446 (Royal Welch) Airborne LAA Rgt, RA 6th/7th Bn, Royal Welch Fusiliers
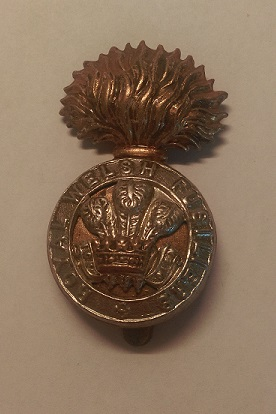
- Regimental cap badge of the Royal Welch Fusiliers
- Active: 1 April 1908–1 April 1971
- Country: United Kingdom
- Branch: Territorial Force
- Role: Infantry; Anti-aircraft artillery
- Size: 1-3 Infantry battalions
- Part of: 53rd (Welsh) Division
- Garrison/HQ: Caernarfon Barracks
- Engagements: World War I: Gallipoli; Palestine; World War II: Normandy; Reichswald; Rhine

Commanders
- Notable commanders: George Pennant, Lord Penrhyn

The 6th (Caernarvonshire & Anglesey) Battalion, Royal Welch Fusiliers, was a Welsh unit of the British Army's auxiliary forces. Formed in 1908, from Volunteer units that dated back to 1860, it fought at Gallipoli, in Egypt and Palestine during World War I, and in the campaign in North West Europe during World War II. Postwar it was converted to the anti-aircraft artillery role, then reverted to infantry in 1956 after it amalgamated with a neighbouring unit.

== Volunteer Force ==
An invasion scare in 1859 led to the emergence of the Volunteer Movement, and Rifle Volunteer Corps (RVCs) began to be organised throughout Great Britain, composed of part-time soldiers eager to supplement the Regular British Army in time of need. The following units were raised from Caernarfonshire (then spelt Carnarvonshire) in North Wales:

- 1st (Carnarvon) Carnarvonshire RVC, raised on 1 March 1860, recruited mainly from the Pennant Slate Quarry at Penrhyn, with George Pennant as captain-commandant; headquarters (HQ) moved from Carnarvon Barracks to Penrhyn after 1862
- 2nd (Carnarvon) Carnarvonshire RVC, raised on 1 March 1860 under Lieutenant Hamilton Alder Roberts, also mainly from Pennant employees; HQ at Penrhyn after 1862
- 3rd (Carnarvon) Carnarvonshire RVC, raised on 1 March 1860 under Capt Henry Runsey Williams; he and his lieutenant reigned in May and Capt Richard Fawcett was commissioned on 2 June; this was the only corps actually recruited in the county town of Caernarvon, mainly from the parish of Llanbeblig
- 4th (Tremadoc) Carnarvonshire RVC, raised on 1 March 1860 under Capt Henry Windus Mathews of Penmorfa, later moved to Portmadoc
- 5th (Pwllheli) Carnarvonshire RVC, raised on 1 March 1860 under Capt Robert Carreg
- 6th (Bangor) Carnarvonshire RVC, raised on 3 March 1860 under Capt Pennant Athel Iremonger (also adjutant of the Royal Carnarvon Rifles Militia), disbanded after October 1865
- 7th (Conway) Carnarvonshire RVC, raised on 4 April 1860 under Capt James Edwards of Conway, disbanded after January 1867

These units were grouped into the 1st Administrative Battalion, Carnarvonshire Rifle Volunteers, formed at Carnarvon on 2 August 1860, with George Pennant promoted to major in command.

Volunteers were also raised from the island of Anglesey. The first proposal came in April 1860 from Holyhead, where 83 employees of the Steam Packet Depot of the London and North Western Railway and the City of Dublin Steam Packet Company offered to form a company, while Mr Rigby of the New Harbour Works had begun to raise and equip a corps from his employees. Neither unit was accepted, but three other corps were formed:

- 1st Anglesey RVC, raised at Amlwch on 6 November 1860 under Capt Henry B. Mitchell
- 2nd Anglesey RVC, raised at Aberffraw on 5 November 1860 under Capt Owen A.F. Meyrick
- 3rd Anglesey RVC, raised at Menai Bridge on 2 November 1860 with the Burma War veteran Major-General Robert G. Hughes as captain-commandant

However, recruitment was poor, discouraged by the influential Non-conformist churches, and the three Anglesey units were disbanded in December 1863, March 1862 and February 1862 respectively.

On 2 October 1868 Capt Mathew succeeded Maj Pennant as officer commanding the 1st Admin Bn. However, Non-conformist influence was strong in Carnarvonshire as well, and the RVCs' numbers steadily fell. In 1874 the 1st Admin Bn of Carnarvonshire RVCs was disbanded and the surviving RVCs in the county were incorporated into the Flintshire battalion. The 1st Carnarvonshire RVC was disbanded after December 1874, and the 2nd and 5th in 1877. After the corps at Pwllheli was disbanded it was replaced by a new 5th Carnarvonshire RVC raised from Llanberis (another slate-mining area) in 1878.

When the RVCs were consolidated in February 1880 the admin battalion became the 1st Flintshire and Carnarvonshire Rifle Volunteers including the following units:

- G & H Companies at Carnavon – from 3rd Carnarvonshire RVC
- I Company at Portmadoc – from 4th Carnarvonshire RVC
- K Company at Llanberis – from 5th Carnarvonshire RVC

Under the 'Localisation of the Forces' scheme introduced by the Cardwell Reforms of 1872, Volunteers were grouped into county brigades with their local Regular and Militia battalions – Sub-District No 23 in Western District for the Flintshire & Carnarvon Battalion, grouped with the 23rd Foot (Royal Welch Fusiliers).

=== Royal Welch Fusiliers ===
The Childers Reforms of 1881 took Cardwell's reforms further, and the Volunteers were formally affiliated to their local Regular regiment, the 1st Flint & Carnarvon becoming a volunteer battalion (VB) of the RWF on 1 July 1881; it was redesignated 2nd Volunteer Battalion, Royal Welch Fusiliers in June 1884.

While the sub-districts were later referred to as 'brigades', they were purely administrative organisations and the Volunteers were excluded from the 'mobilisation' part of the Cardwell system. The Stanhope Memorandum of December 1888 proposed a more comprehensive Mobilisation Scheme for Volunteer units, which would assemble in their own brigades at key points in case of war. In peacetime these brigades provided a structure for collective training. Under this scheme the two Volunteer Battalions of the RWF formed part of the Welsh Brigade, later moving to the Welsh Border Brigade.

By 1896 the 2nd VB had 16 companies, but on 26 May 1897 the eight Carnarvon companies were separated to form a new 3rd Volunteer Battalion, Royal Welch Fusiliers. A new company was raised in Holyhead, Anglesey, in 1900, giving the battalion the following organisation:

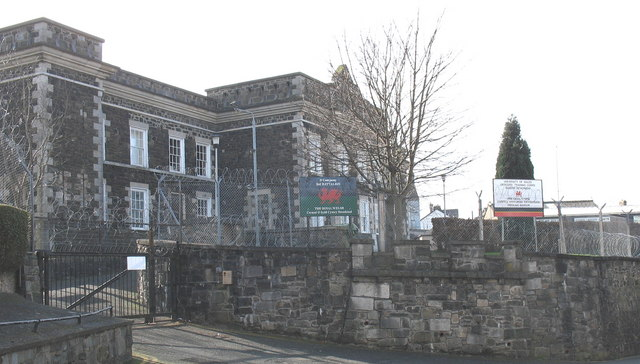
Caernarvon Barracks.

- HQ at Carnarvon
- A & B Companies at Carnarvon
- C Company at Portmadoc
- D Company at Penygroes
- E Company at Llanberis
- F Company at Conwy
- G Company at Penmaenmawr
- H Company at Pwllheli
- I Company at Holyhead

The battalion also had a thriving Cyclist Detachment.

=== Second Boer War ===
After Black Week in December 1899, the Volunteers were invited to send active service units to assist the Regulars in the Second Boer War. The War Office decided that one company 116 strong could be recruited from the volunteer battalions of any infantry regiment that had a regular battalion serving in South Africa. The three RWF VBs accordingly raised the 1st Volunteer Service Company (VSC), which joined the 1st Battalion at Modderspruit on 12 March 1900. After more than a year of active service the 1st VSC began its journey home on 28 October 1901, having been relieved by a 2nd VSC of the regiment. The 2nd VSC in turn was replaced by a 3rd VSC, which began the journey home on 13 June 1902 after a period of garrison duty on the Schoonspruit railway. This service earned the volunteer battalions their first Battle honour: South Africa 1900–02. At least four members of the 3rd Bn died on service in South Africa.

In 1906 the Welsh Border Brigade was reorganised as the North Wales Border Brigade, based at Shrewsbury, whereupon the 3rd VB transferred to the Wrexham-based Mersey Brigade for training purposes.

== Territorial Force ==
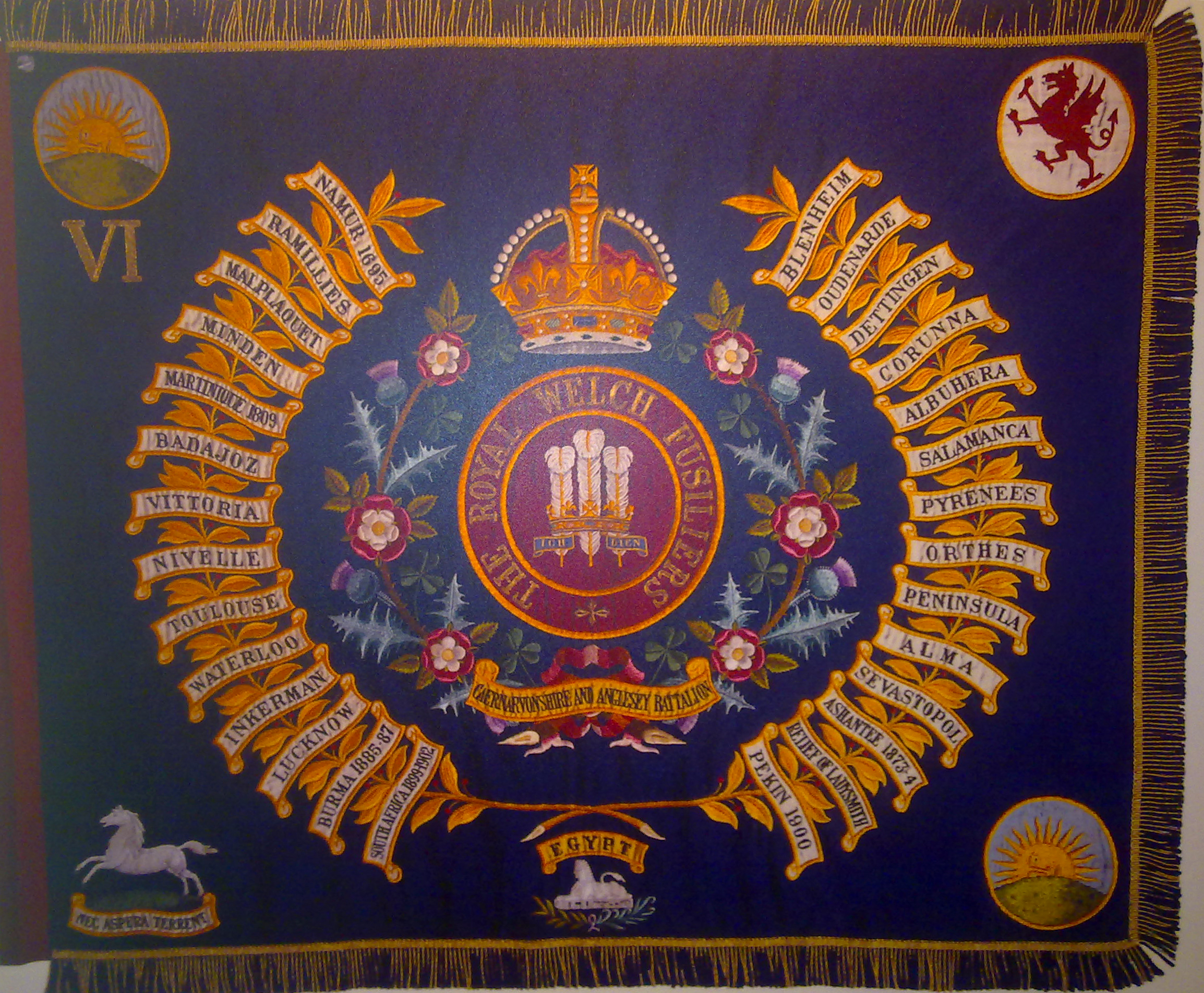
The 1939 Regimental Colour of the 6th (Caernarvonshire and Anglesey) Bn, Royal Welch Fusiliers.

When the Volunteers were subsumed into the new Territorial Force (TF) under the Haldane Reforms of 1908, the 3rd VB became the 6th (Carnarvonshire and Anglesey) Battalion, Royal Welch Fusiliers. (Note: The regiment used the spelling 'Welch' in preference to 'Welsh', even though this was not officially recognised until 1920.) (Note: The Carnarvonshire and Anglesey subtitle was added in March 1909.) The battalion was jointly administered by the Carnarvonshire and Anglesey TF Associations.

The battalion was distributed as follows:

- Battalion HQ at Carnarvon
- A Company at Carnarvon
- B Company at Snowdon Street, Portmadoc
- C Company at County Hall, Penygroes, with a detachment at Nantlle
- D Company at The Old Station, Llanberis, with a detachment at Ebenezer
- E Company at Mount Pleasant, Conway, with a detachment at Argyll Road, Llandudno
- F Company at Penmaenmawr
- G Company at North Quay, Pwllheli, with a detachment at Criccieth
- H Company at Moreton Road, Holyhead, with a detachment at Dale Street, Menai Bridge

It formed part of the North Wales Brigade of the TF's Welsh Division.

== World War I ==
=== Mobilisation ===
On 3 August 1914 the Welsh Division's infantry brigades were at their annual camps when all training was cancelled and the battalions were ordered back to their HQs; war was declared next day. On 5 August they mobilised, and had concentrated at their war stations (at Conway in the case of the North Wales Brigade) by 11 August. On that date TF units were invited to volunteer for Overseas Service and on 15 August the War Office issued instructions to separate those men who had signed up for Home Service only, and form these into reserve units. On 31 August, the formation of a reserve or 2nd Line unit was authorised for each 1st Line unit where 60 per cent or more of the men had volunteered for Overseas Service. The titles of these 2nd Line units would be the same as the original, but distinguished by a '2/' prefix. In this way duplicate battalions, brigades and divisions were created, mirroring those TF formations being sent overseas. Later 3rd Line units were formed to train drafts for the 1st and 2nd Line.

=== 1/6th (Carnarvonshire & Anglesey) Battalion ===
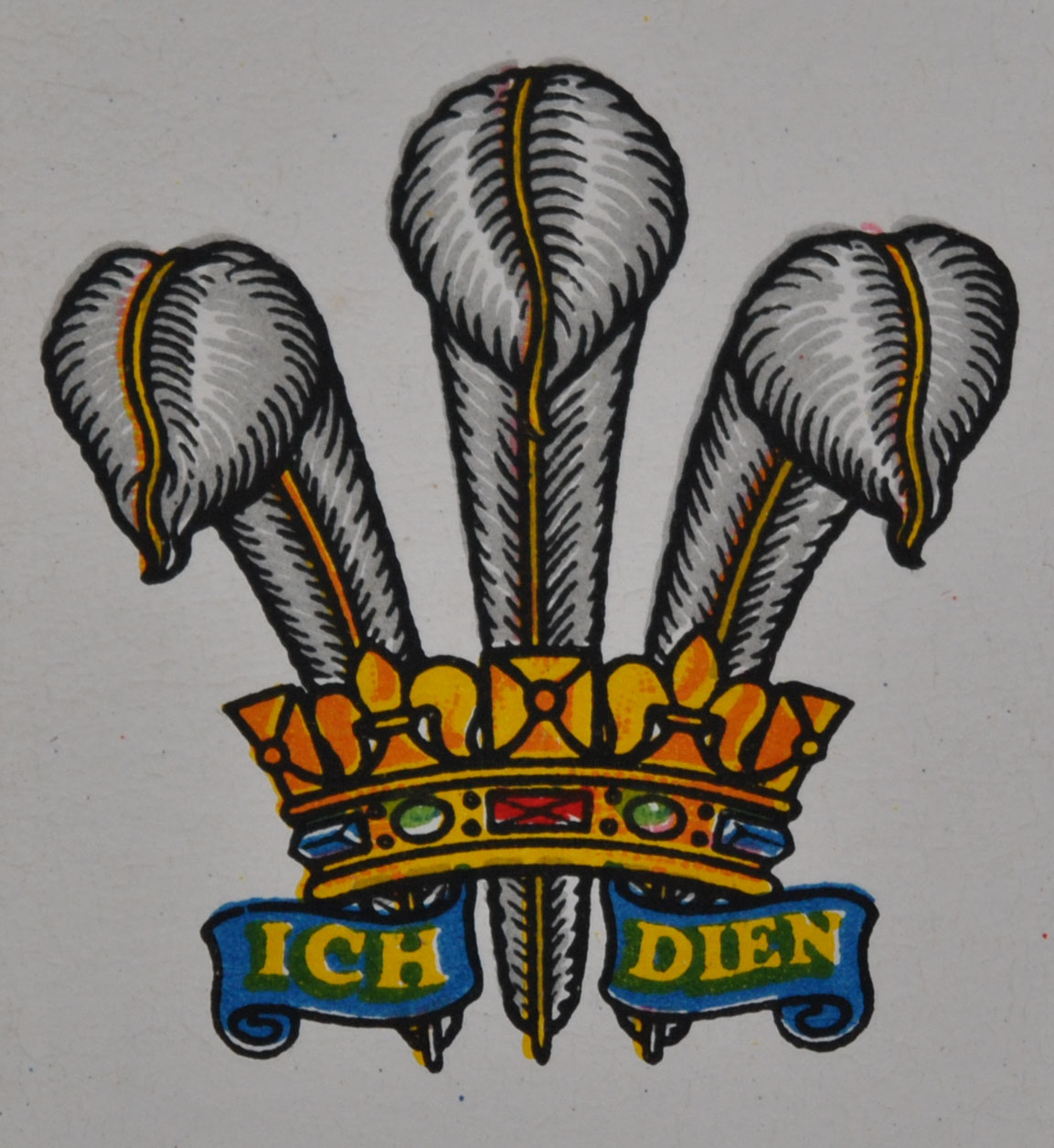
The Prince of Wales's feathers formation badge of the 53rd (Welsh) Division in World War I.

The Welsh Division moved to Northampton at the end of August 1914, where on 18 November it was warned for service in India, but this was subsequently cancelled. Training was interrupted by periods spent digging trenches for the East Coast defences. In December the division moved to Cambridge, then to Bedford in May 1915, where it was numbered as the 53rd (Welsh) Division, and the North Wales Brigade became the 158th (North Wales) Brigade. By July the battalion was at Rushden in Northamptonshire. On 2 July the division was ordered to refit for service in the Mediterranean. A considerable amount of last-minute dental work was required to render sufficient men of the 1/6th Bn medically fit for overseas service, though the dentures ordered for many of them did not reach them until a year later. The first battalions of the division to move were the 1/5th and 1/6th RWF, who entrained at Irchester for Devonport during the night of 13 July. The two battalions embarked on the Caledonia and sailed on 14 July.

==== Gallipoli ====
The transports sailed via Gibraltar, Malta, Alexandria and Lemnos, and the 1/6th Bn arrived at Mudros on 28 July, where it disembarked and went into bivouacs. It re-embarked on the Rowan for Imbros on 8 August. Next day the division took part in the Landing at Suvla Bay, an attempt to break the Trench warfare deadlock in the Gallipoli Campaign. The battalion landed at 'C' Beach at 06.00 and bivouacked at Lala Baba.

158th Brigade supported 159th (Cheshire) Brigade in an attack towards Scimitar Hill on 10 August with 1/6th RWF on the left of the brigade. The officers had no maps and confusion reigned, but the battalion advanced across the Salt Lake under heavy shrapnel and rifle fire, passing through 11th (Northern) Division on Chocolate Hill and advancing on Green Hill. 1/5th Royal Welch Fusiliers had penetrated to within a few hundred yards of Scimitar Hill and its Commanding Officer (CO) sent back a message urging the 1/6th RWF to come up and help complete the job, but he was killed soon afterwards. Part of 1/6th RWF reached Green Hill before it was driven back by Turkish fire. The battalion was later withdrawn to 160th (South Wales) Bde's line; further attempts to take Scimitar Hill during the afternoon all failed.

The corps commander, Lt-Gen Sir Frederick Stopford, had lost confidence in 53rd (W) Division, and would not use it in the subsequent phases of the battle. Over the following days the division was engaged in reorganising and improving the trenches facing Scimitar Hill, taking casualties from Turkish rifle fire. It also began to suffer badly from sickness.

In October the 1/6th Bn's strength had been reduced to 21 officers and 354 other ranks (ORs) and it was temporarily amalgamated with the similarly weakened 1/5th Bn, the combined battalion being under the command of Lt-Col Rome of 1/6th Bn. Turkish artillery became more active during November, adding to the toll of casualties from trench-holding, the trenches were flooded, and later there was a blizzard. So many men were evacuated suffering from frostbite and exposure that only 8 officers and 102 ORs remained in the line. The effective strength of 53rd (W) Division was very low and it was decided to evacuate the remnants. On 12 December the battalion moved to 'C' Beach to embark on the El Kahirah to Mudros. The division was then shipped to Alexandria, where it landed between 20 and 23 December.

==== Egypt ====
On arrival in Egypt the division went by rail to Wardan to recuperate. In mid-February 1916 158th Bde was sent to guard the water supplies at Wadi Natrun, where reinforcement drafts were absorbed and training was carried out. In May the brigade moved to Zeitoun, Cairo, where it rejoined the rest of 53rd (W) Division in the Suez Canal defences. By July 158th Bde was near Moascar, digging defences, but when it became clear that the Turks were crossing the Sinai Desert to attack the canal line, the brigade was sent by train and route march to Romani to reinforce 52nd (Lowland) Division in No 3 Section of the Canal Defences, arriving on 21 July. The brigade took up positions in Redoubts 6 to 10a, but 1/6th RWF was not engaged when the Turks attacked on 4 August (the Battle of Romani), and 158th Bde remained in position after the Turks retreated.

==== Gaza ====
158th Brigade returned to the canal on 14 August and spent the next three months at Ferdan. By the end of the year it was back at Romani, the Egyptian Expeditionary Force (EEF) having cleared Sinai of the enemy. On 20 January 1917 53rd (W) Division began the march across the Sinai Desert, reaching Wadi el Arish at the end of the month. It moved up to Rafah on 21 March. After an approach march beginning on 24 March, the EEF attacked Gaza on 26 March, launching the First Battle of Gaza. 53rd (W) Division in the Desert Column was ordered to cross the Wadi Ghuzze towards Gaza itself, masked by the mounted divisions sweeping round the flank. The division was led by 160th Bde, followed by 158th. There was an overnight fog, so 158th Bde was late crossing the wadi, but by 06.30 it reached the edge of the Mansura ridge overlooking the plain of Gaza. At 11.30 the division was hurriedly ordered to attack, even though the artillery had not yet established communications. 158th Brigade set out shortly after 11.45 to attack Ali Muntar. The whole advance, watched by the mounted divisions, was 'a model in precision and steadiness'. After leaving the protection of Mansura the three battalions marched across open ground parallel to the Ali Muntar defences before wheeling left and moving towards their objectives. Rifle fire now broke out from Green Hill and slowed the advance. Here firing became general, until the brigadier sent another battalion to take Green Hill. The whole line then advanced again. By 18.30 the whole Ali Muntar position was won, and by nightfall Gaza was almost completely surrounded, with patrols from 53rd (W) Division in the eastern streets linking up with the ANZAC Mounted Division. However, the senior British commanders were unaware of the success, and had already ordered the mounted troops to withdraw to water their horses. 53rd (W) Division was ordered to dig in on a line near Wadi Ghuzze next day; at the end of the day the whole division was withdrawn across the wadi, 158th Bde arriving at 01.15 on 28 March. The battalion's casualties were 2 officers and 14 ORs killed, 11 officers and 138 ORs wounded, and 3 ORs missing.

Both sides brought up reinforcements and carried out reconnaissances while the EEF prepared for a Second Battle of Gaza. 53rd (W) Division dug a new line well forward on sand dunes along the coast. When the attack was made on 18 April, 158th Bde held this new line, the other brigades passing through and assaulting Samson Ridge with tank support. As the attack developed, 158th Bde moved up in support, with 1/6th RWF sent to help 159th Bde. But the division was held up at Samson Ridge by the end of the day, and dug in where it stood.

Trench warfare now set in for the summer, while the EEF was reorganised under new command and intensive training was carried out behind the lines. On 20 October 158th Bde moved up to the concentration area for the new offensive (the Third Battle of Gaza), taking over 'Kent Fort' and reconnoitring the ground over which they were to attack. On 25 October the brigade moved into No man's land and established an outpost line. On 27 October the division advanced to take over a line of hills already occupied by the Yeomanry of the 8th Mounted Brigade. However, the Yeomanry outpost on Hill 630 was overwhelmed by a Turkish attack before 1/5th RWF could relieve them. The Turks then had perfect observation over the plain where 158th Bde was moving up, followed by160th Bde, and began shelling the concentration of troops. Once the division was re-organised for an attack, the Turks slipped away and the line of hills was easily reoccupied. The main attack, a turning movement against Beersheba (the Battle of Beersheba) began on 31 October; 53rd (W) Division on the left flank was hardly engaged, though 1/6th RWF with part of 158th Bde in 'Smith's Group' made a demonstration with long-range fire, and ended the day on outpost duty.

After the capture of Beersheba, the EEF thrust into the hills beyond, with 53rd (W) Division marching through Beersheba to occupy a line beyond without any fighting. On 3 November the division advanced into the hills in a series of columns, 158th Bde in reserve. After a two-day lull during a sandstorm and a difficult assembly close up to Tel el Khuweilfe, 158th Bde carried out a fullscale assault on the position at 04.20 on 6 November. 1/6th Battalion in the centre of the brigade was a little late in starting. It carried the heights with the bayonet and captured nine field guns on the far side, but its companies were then far ahead of the troops on either flank and were counter-attacked from three directions. The battalion had to abandon the captured guns and withdraw to higher ground, fired on by mistake by the British artillery as they retired.. The troops rallied, and took up a new line with a company of 1/5th Bn that had come up in support. Deadlock then set in, but next day the Desert Mounted Corps (DMC) swept round the flank of the pinned enemy. 53rd (W) Division was ordered to stand fast, though 1/5th RWF used rifle grenades to bombard and then rush a troublesome Turkish machine gun and sniper post. But that night the Turks in front pulled out as the entire Turkish army began a headlong retreat.

==== Jerusalem ====
From 10 November 53rd (W) Division remained in the area, so as not to overload the supply lines for the advancing parts of the EEF. It did not move forward again until early December, and even then limited supplies meant that 158th Bde was left at Beersheba. It was not brought forward until 21 December, by which time the Battle of Jerusalem was over. At Christmas 158th Bde relieved 159th Bde, in the line covering Jerusalem, with 1/6th RWF on the brigade's right. Late on 26 December the Turks launched a major counter-attack aiming to recapture Jerusalem, and the fighting spread to 53rd (W) Division's front on 27 December, though 158th Bde was hardly engaged, mainly supporting 160th Bde on its flank. A 'feeble' attack against 1/6th RWF was easily checked by the end of the day the brigade had reoccupied a captured village. As the Turkish attacks faded away, the division went over to the attack itself, 158th Bde attacking the villages and high ground in its front, 1/6th RWF led by Capt Emrys Evans taking 'Grey Hill'. The brigade took further ground on 28 December. 53rd (W) Division held its line throughout the bad weather of January 1918, with 158th Bde providing working parties to improve the roads for the EEF's next advance, aimed at Jericho. This began on 14 February, supported by 53rd (W) Division, and the town was captured by 22 February.

==== Tell 'Asur ====
In March the EEF began an advance in the Jordan Valley. 53rd (W) Division's next objective was Tell 'Asur, the highest point of Judaea north of Jerusalem, and it had to tackle the most difficult terrain in the whole operation. The division occupied No man's land in the preceding days, then after a heavy bombardment on 9 March the 1/5th RWF captured the hill at about 09.30, despite morning fog. A Turkish counter-attack regained the summit, but 1/6th RWF came up in relief and drove them off it. In the next four hours the Turks launched four more fierce attacks on the hill, but failed to recapture it. During the night 1/6th Bn moved down to take Tinto Hill a mile in front, but could not shift the Turks among the boulders. However the division completed its objectives by 12 March. 158th Brigade was not engaged in the various raids across the Jordan carried out by the EEF during Spring 1918.

=== 5/6th Battalion ===
In the summer 53rd (Welsh) Division was changed to the Indian Army establishment: only one British battalion was retained in each brigade, the remainder being sent as reinforcements to the Western Front. Initially, 1/5th and 1/6th Bns RWF continued in 158th Bde alongside Gurkha and Indian battalions from June, then on 1 August the two battalions merged to form the 5th/6th Battalion, Royal Welsh Fusiliers under the command of Lt-Col Borthwick of the 1/5th. This continued as the sole British battalion in 158th Bde for the remainder of the campaign.

==== Megiddo ====
At the climactic Battle of Megiddo 53rd (W) Division was tasked with advancing across the Samieh Basin towards Nablus, to threaten the Turks' communication centre and block the exits to the Jordan Valley (the Battle of Nablus). It attacked in moonlight late on the first day (18 September), after a 20-minute bombardment. 158th Brigade was in reserve, but a company of 5th/6th RWF was attached to the leading Indian unit of 160th Bde (17th Infantry (The Loyal Regiment) and covered the left flank of the advance, occupying Keen's Knoll and Table Hill. Next day 5th/6th RWF relieved 4th/5th Welch Regiment (159th Bde) and secured the plateau in front ready for the advance to continue on 20 September, with Lt-Col Borthwick of 5th/6th RWF commanding the whole operation until the rest of the brigade caught up. Because of difficulties in making a road, 158th Bde was not ready until late on 20 September, but when it advanced at 23.00 it found the Turks had retired. It continued advancing through the night with 5th/6th RWF leading until 05.30 on 21 September when it found the road blocked. The roads were very bad, and the Royal Engineers struggled to make a path for the guns, but the advance continued at 08.30, with 5th/6th RWF picquetting the hills as it went. By the end of the next day the Turkish army was shattered, and its retreat was being.harried by artillery and aircraft.

The advanced troops of the division were now south-east of Nablus, but 53rd (W) Division was ordered to stand fast and did not take part in the pursuit of the defeated Turkish army. For the next few days it was employed in clearing the battlefield and repairing the Nablus road. On 26 September it moved back to Tell 'Asur, and by 12 October it had moved to Ramle, where on 27 October it began entraining for Alexandria. The Armistice of Mudros ended the fighting in Palestine on 31 October. On 20 December demobilisation instructions were received and the first parties left for home on 22 December. The Indian battalions left in early 1919 as transport became available, and the British units were reduced to cadres. The last details left for Port Said and shipment home on 15 June. The 5th/6th RWF was officially disembodied on 4 August 1919.

==== Commanding officers ====
The following officers commanded 1/6th and 5th/6th RWF during the war:

- Lt-Col T.W. James, from 17 June 1912
- Lt-Col C.S. Rome, from 9 October 1915 (including amalgamated battalion) until promoted to command 158th Bde April 1917
- Capt F. Mills, acting 17 July–10 September 1916; promoted Lt-Col in command 5 April 1917
- Lt-Col E.H. Evans from 19 March 1918 until amalgamation
- Lt-Col F.H. Borthwick, 1/5th Bn, from amalgamation to Armistice

=== 2/6th (Carnarvonshire & Anglesey) Battalion ===
The 2/6th (Carnarvonshire & Anglesey) Bn formed at Carmarthen on 11 September 1914. It was assigned to 203rd (2nd North Wales) Brigade in 68th (2nd Welsh) Division, which began to assemble at Northampton in April 1915. It replaced the 53rd (W) Division at Bedford in July. Training was made difficult by the lack of arms and equipment, and the need to supply drafts to the 1st Line units. At first the men were issued with obsolete .256-in Japanese Ariska rifles for training. In July the battalions were reorganised and the Home Service-only men were transferred to Provisional units (47th Provisional Bn, later 23rd Bn Royal Welch Fusiliers, in the case of the RWF's TF battalions). By November the 2nd Line battalions were so weak that their establishment was reduced to 600 men. Late in 1915 the 68th (2nd W) Division's battalions handed over their Japanese rifles to the provisional battalions and were issued with some old Lee–Enfield rifles converted to charger loading.

68th (2nd Welsh) Division was assigned to Home Defence duties and in November 1915 it joined First Army in Central Force. By September 1916 the division was in General Reserve for Central Force, and by May 1917 it had transferred to Northern Army (Home Forces). From April 1917 the 2/6th Bn was at Henham Park in Halesworth, Suffolk, for its summer station. It was disbanded on 8 September 1917 at Halesworth, the personnel being drafted to other units in 203rd Brigade.

=== 3/6th (Carnarvonshire & Anglesey) Battalion ===
The 3/6th (Carnarvonshire & Anglesey) Bn formed at Carnarvon on 29 May 1915. It was redesignated as 6th (Reserve) (Carnarvonshire & Anglesey) Bn, RWF, on 8 April 1916 and on 1 September 1916 it was absorbed into the 4th (Reserve) (Denbighshire) Bn, RWF, in the Welsh Reserve Bde at Oswestry.

== Interwar ==
The TF was reconstituted on 7 February 1920 (reorganising as the Territorial Army (TA) the following year) and both the 5th and 6th RWF were reformed. The 5th (Carnarvonshire & Anglesey) Bn re-established its HQ at Carnarfon Barracks, with two cadet corps attached: the Carnarvon Town Cadet Corps and the Criccieth Cadet Company. It formed part of 158th (Royal Welch) Bde in 53rd (Welsh) Division. It officially changed the spelling of its subtitle to 'Caernarvonshire' in August 1937.

With the expansion of the TA after the Munich Crisis, the 6th formed a duplicate 9th Bn on 1 July 1939.

== World War II ==
=== 6th (Caernarvonshire & Anglesey) Battalion ===
Formation sign of the 53rd (Welsh) Division, World War II.

53rd (Welsh) Division mobilised in Western Command on the outbreak of war in September 1939. Parts of the division were sent to Northern Ireland from October 1939, and the whole division was stationed there from 3 April 1940 to 30 April 1941 as part of VI Corps.

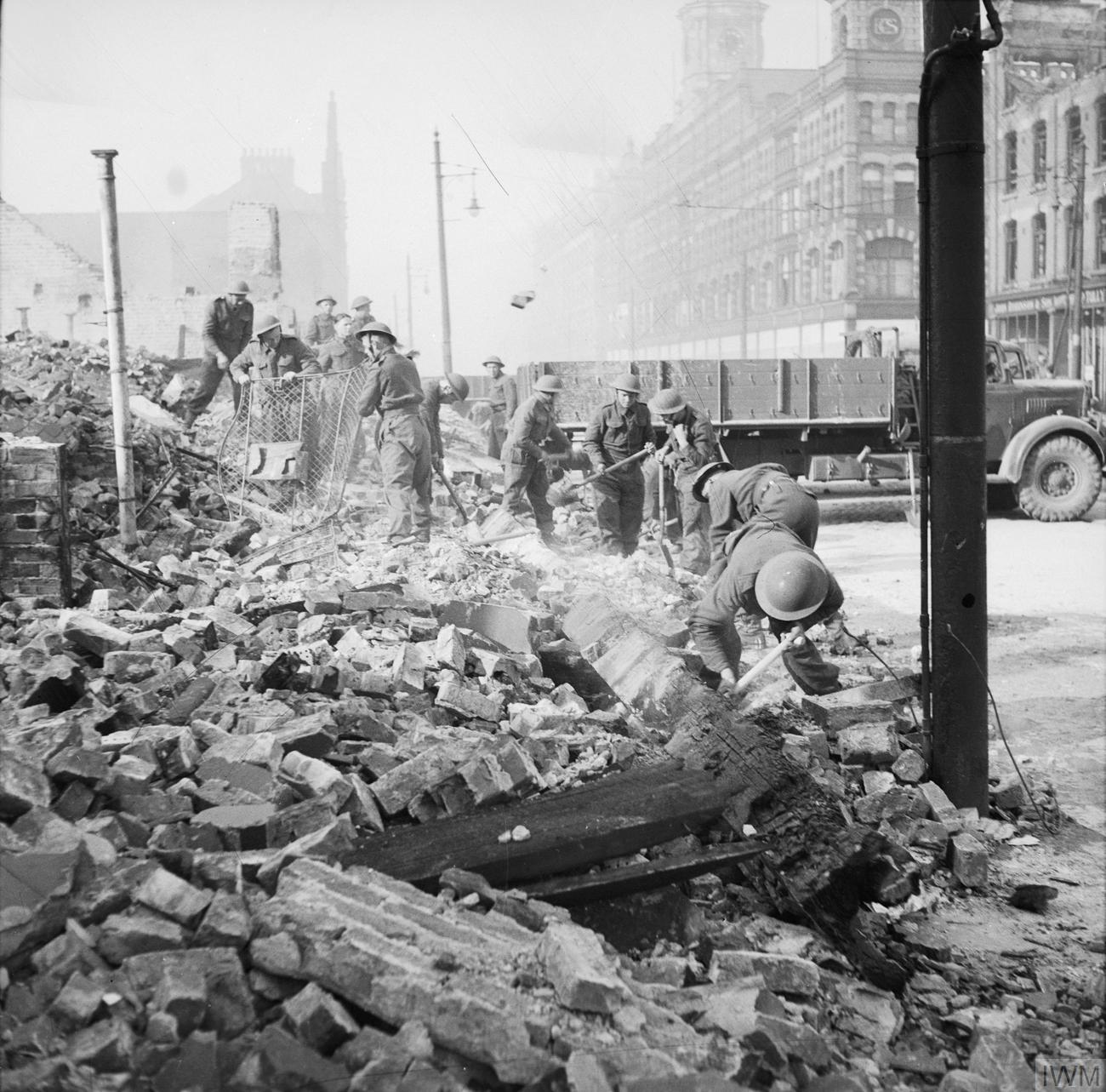
Royal Welch Fusiliers help to clear air raid damage in Belfast, Northern Ireland, 7 May 1941.

On returning to mainland Britain, the division served under III Corps and Western Command. On 8 April 1942 it was assigned to XII Corps District, then from 15 May 1943 in XII Corps it became part of 21st Army Group training for the Allied invasion of Normandy (Operation Overlord).

==== Normandy ====
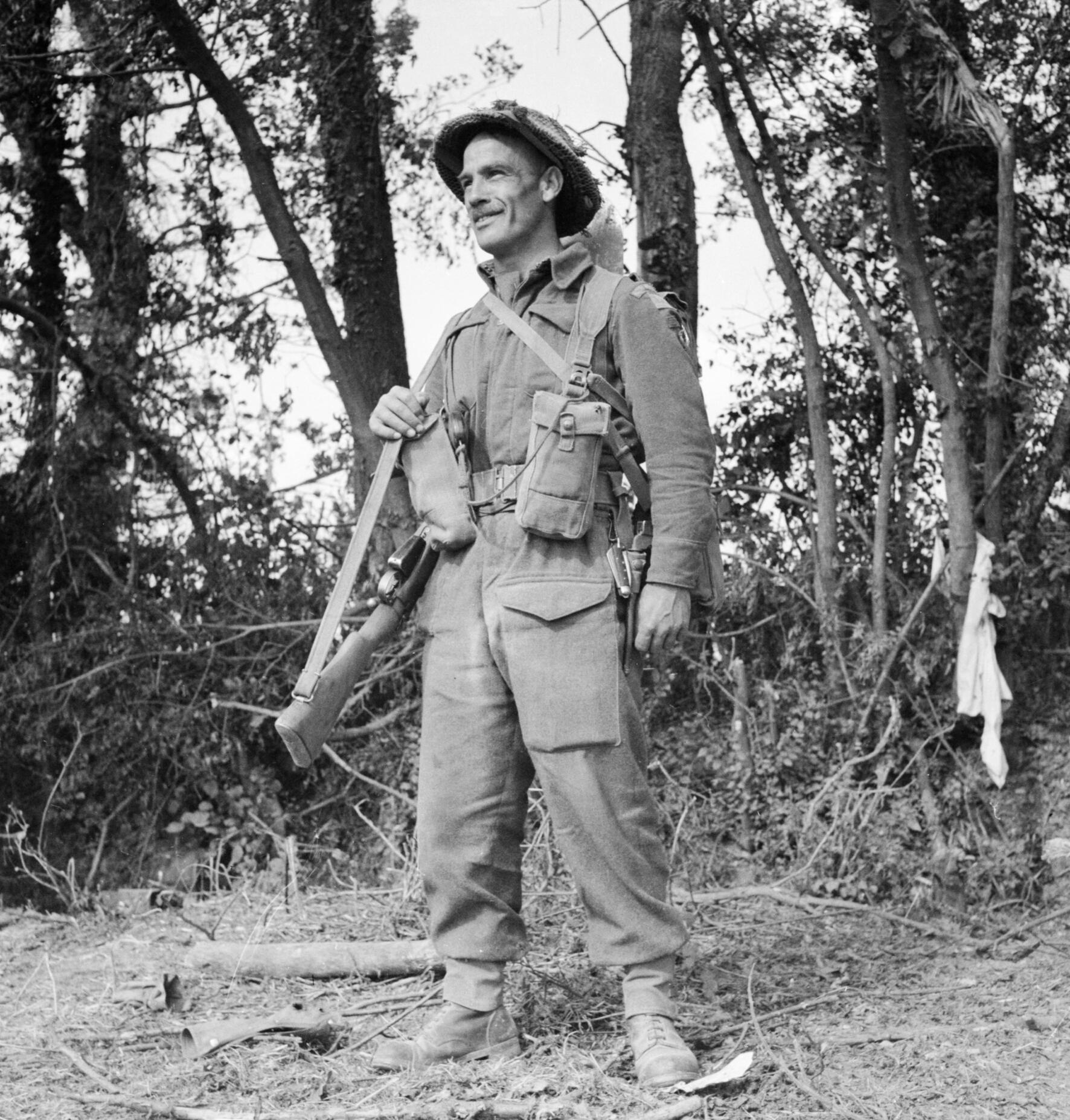
Fusilier Tom Payne, 11 Platoon, 'B' Company, 6th RWF, in Normandy, 12 August 1944.

53rd (Welsh) Division was not in the first wave landing on D Day; it sailed to Normandy and 158th Bde landed at La Rivière on Gold Beach on 25 June 1944. On the night of 29/30 June the division began moving into 'Scottish Corridor' to relieve the 15th (Scottish) Division, which had battered its way into the enemy lines during the Battle of the Odon (Operation Epsom); the relief was completed on 1/2 July. The division played a minor part in the next offensive phase, Operation Jupiter, guarding the western flank of the attack.

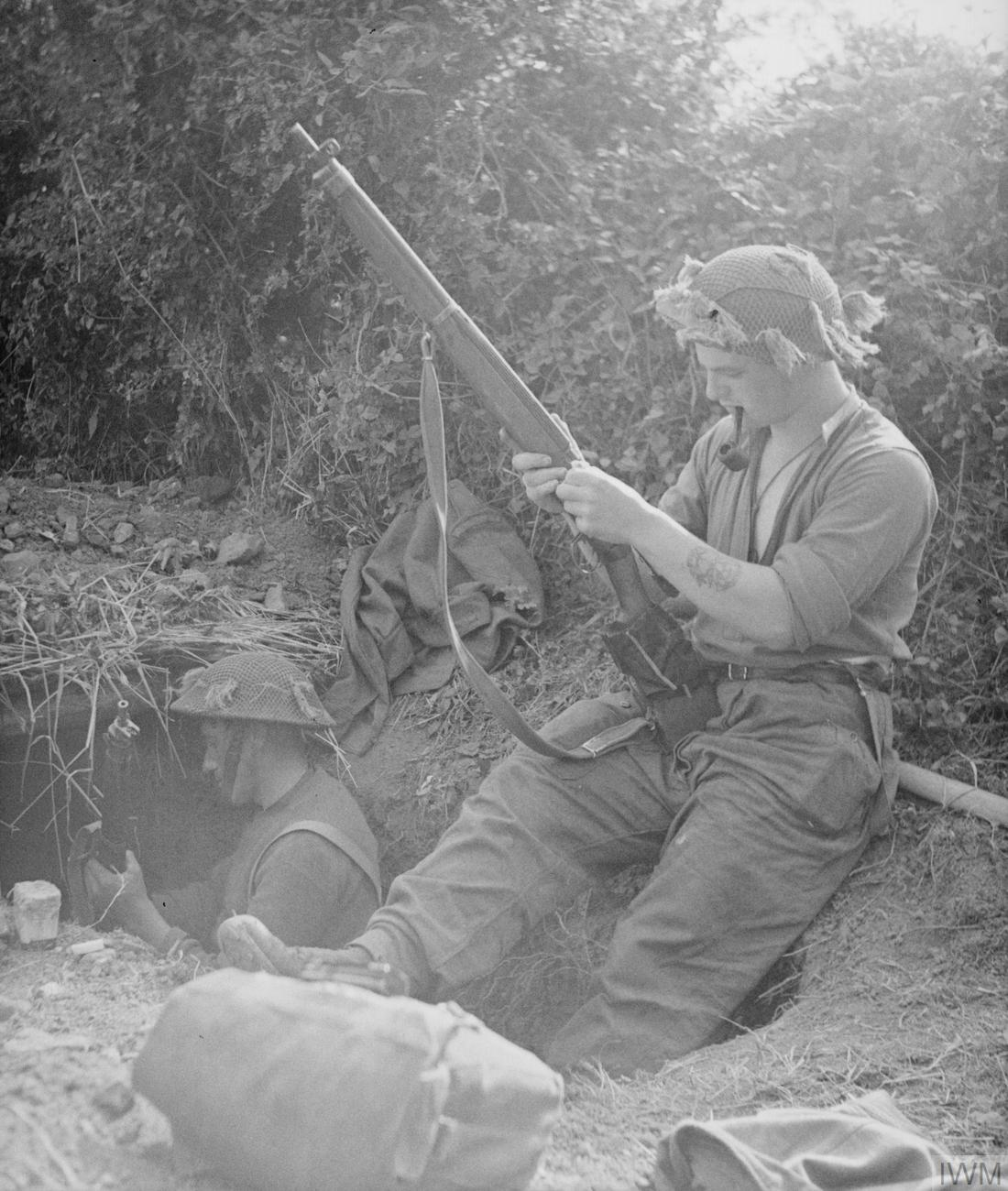
Royal Welch Fusiliers cleaning their rifles before the attack at Évrecy.

Preparatory attacks for Operation Goodwood began on 15 July with XII Corps pushing towards Évrecy. 53rd (Welsh) Division captured Cahier, but only held onto it with difficulty against heavy enemy counter-attacks. After 'Goodwood' had failed to break through south of Caen, 53rd (W) Division relieved 15th (S) Division at the le Bon Repos crossroads during the night of 19/20 July. On 21 July the position came under heavy attack by 10th SS Panzer Division, losing some ground and suffering heavy casualties. Following their heavy casualties, the three RWF battalions of 158th Bde were split up across the division, with 6th RWF transferring on 4 August to 160th Bde.

When the breakout from the Normandy beachhead began in early August, XII Corps began pushing south, with 53rd (W) Division clearing the east bank of the River Orne, while XXX Corps captured Mont Pinçon. 21st Army Group then endeavoured to close the northern side of the Falaise Gap to prevent the Germans escaping eastwards. By 18–19 August the division was in defensive positions west of Falaise, and on 20 August it captured Bazoches-au-Houlme.

After the Falaise Pocket was eliminated, XII and XXX Corps led 21st Army Group's rapid advance eastwards to the Seine. 15th (Scottish) Division seized bridgeheads on 27 August, and because the armour was not ready it was 53rd (W) Division that led the advance out of the bridgehead towards the Somme. On 30 August 53rd (W) Division was motoring forward with an open flank, but ran into a lot of scattered opposition. The Somme was crossed on 1 September. Opposition stiffened as the division pushed through La Bassée and Béthune on 3 September, but 7th Armoured Division bypassed this opposition and drove on while 53rd (W) Division stayed to 'mop up'. On 4 September the division cleared St Pol and was working its way through the canal area west of Lille. By 6 September 21 Army Group's advance had been halted at the lines of the Albert Canal and the Escaut Canal, where it regrouped.

==== North West Europe ====
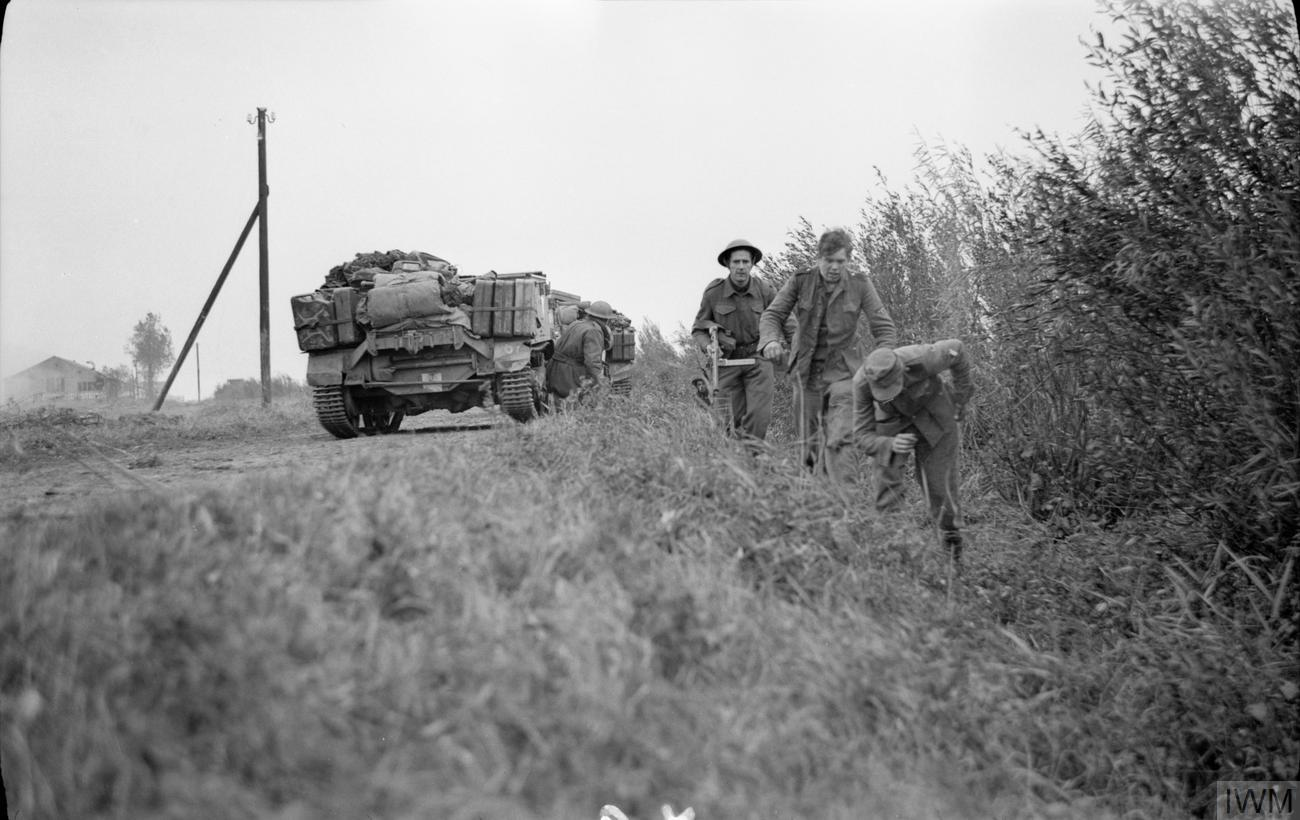
Bringing in German prisoners past the Carriers of 6th RWF during the fighting at 's-Hertogenbosch.

XII Corps had a relatively minor role in Operation Market Garden, XXX Corps' attempt to 'bounce' a succession of bridges as far as Arnhem on the Rhine. However, 53rd (W) Division was engaged in heavy fighting to cross the Junction Canal and then clear the Wilhelmina Canal on XXX Corps' left flank. After the failure at Arnhem, the division continued to push forwards in Operation Pheasant, capturing 's-Hertogenbosch on 26 October after five days of hard fighting. It was then moved south to face the 'Venlo Pocket' along the west bank of the River Maas. When the Germans launched a major counter-offensive in the Ardennes (the Battle of the Bulge) in December 1944, 53rd (W) Division was among the formations sent by 21st Army Group to reinforce the northern flank of the 'Bulge'. It later reclaimed much of the lost ground despite enemy counter-attacks.

The Allied offensive was renewed in February 1945. 53rd (Welsh) Division was now in XXX Corps, which was tasked with clearing the Reichswald in Operation Veritable. This saw some of the most bitter fighting of the campaign, amid mud and mines, the 53rd (W) Division's experience fighting through the Reichswald itself to Goch and Weeze was described by Lt-Gen Brian Horrocks, XXX Corps' commander, as 'one of the most unpleasant weeks of the war'. Having cleared the west bank of the Rhine, 21st Army Group stormed across the river on 23/24 March in Operation Plunder. 53rd (Welsh) Division crossed into the bridgehead on 26 March for the breakout, and then continued its advance across Germany to the River Elbe against stiff opposition.

The German surrender at Lüneburg Heath saw 6th (Caernarvonshire & Anglesey) Battalion in Hamburg. The battalion was among the British Army representatives at the Victory Parade in Paris. It was placed in suspended animation after August 1945.

=== 9th (Caernarvonshire & Anglesey) Battalion ===
Formation sign of the 38th (Welsh) Division, World War II.

At the outbreak of war 9th RWF had been assigned to 115th Bde in 38th (Welsh) Infantry Division, the 2nd Line duplicate of 53rd (Welsh) Division. The division was still forming when war broke out and only assumed full control of its units on 18 September. It remained training in South Wales during the early part of the war, then moved to North West England under III Corps. By May 1941 it was in reserve just behind the invasion-threatened coast of Sussex. However, at the end of the year it was placed on a lower establishment, as a static coast defence formation with no prospect of active service overseas. It spent 1942–43 in various locations in Southern England.

9th Royal Welch Fusiliers remained in 115th Bde until 11 October 1943, when it transferred to 220th Bde in 76th Infantry (Reserve) Division. This formation was used as a source of reinforcements for 21st Army Group after D Day in June 1944. On 23 July 9th RWF transferred to 211th Bde in 80th Infantry (Reserve) Division. By 1 September 1944 most of the division's personnel had been drafted as reinforcements to 21st Army Group, and 211th Bde was transferred to 38th Division, now also reformed as a Reserve formation. 211th Brigade was then redesignated 114th Bde. 9th Royal Welsh Fusiliers continued in this training and draft-finding role until the end of the war.

After the war 9th (Caernarvonshire & Anglesey) Battalion was placed in suspended animation on 16 March 1946.

== Postwar ==
When the TA was reconstituted on 1 January 1947, 9th Bn was re-absorbed and 6th Bn was transferred to the Royal Artillery (RA), reforming at Caernarvon as 635 (Royal Welch) Light Anti-Aircraft Regiment, RA. It formed part of 95 (Anti-Aircraft) Army Group Royal Artillery based in Newport, Monmouthshire (which became 95 AA Brigade in 1948).

When Anti-Aircraft Command was disbanded on 10 March 1955 there were wholesale mergers among the TA's AA units: 635 LAA Rgt amalgamated with 636 (Royal Welch) LAA Rgt (the former 7th (Montgomeryshire & Merioneth) Bn, RWF) as 446 (Royal Welch) Airborne LAA Rgt. However it was converted back to infantry on 1 July the following year as 6/7th Battalion, Royal Welch Fusiliers. When the TA was converted into the Territorial and Army Volunteer Reserve (TAVR) on 1 April 1967 the battalion was reduced to three companies (A and C at Caernarvon, B at Aberystwyth), but supplied some personnel to A (RWF) Company in the Welsh Volunteers, TAVR. Then on 1 April 1969 the battalion was reduced to a cadre in the Welsh Volunteers but also formed D (RWF) Company in the regiment. When the Welsh Volunteers were disbanded on 1 April 1971, A and D (RWF) Companies transferred to a new 3rd (Volunteer) Battalion, Royal Welch Fusiliers, TAVR. This battalion was merged into 2nd Bn, Royal Regiment of Wales, in 1999.

== Honorary Colonels ==
The following served as Honorary Colonel of the Carnarvonshire and Anglesey Rifle Volunteers and their successors:

- Henry Paget, 4th Marquess of Anglesey, appointed 13 May 1891, died 13 October 1898
- John Ernest Greaves, appointed 16 November 1898
- Hugh, 4th Lord Penrhyn, appointed 5 October 1932, to 1946

=== Other prominent members ===
- Malcolm Eve, later Lord Silsoe, served as a platoon commander in 1/6th Bn RWF at Gallipoli.
- Henry Paget, 7th Marquess of Anglesey, a major in the Royal Horse Guards during World War II and a noted military historian, served as a captain in 635th (Royal Welch) LAA Regiment 1950–53.

== Uniforms and Insignia ==
The uniform of the Carnarvonshire Rifle Volunteers was a 'Volunteer grey' tunic with scarlet collar and pointed cuffs edged with black braid, and with a decorative black braid knot above and below the cuff edging. The trousers were grey with a broad black stripe. The head-dress was a grey cloth Shako with a black patent leather peak and chinstrap. The 7th (Conway) RVC was the exception, wearing a Rifle green uniform and shako. Each RVC had a different badge, but these began to be standardised within the Admin Bn by 1865. The short-lived Anglesey RVCs wore a Volunteer grey uniform, with a grey shako carrying a bronze badge consisting of the Prince of Wales's feathers, coronet and 'Ich Dien' motto.

The 1st Flintshire & Carnarvonshire Rifle Volunteers wore a red uniform with green facings and blue trousers with a red stripe. The Home Service helmet with spike was worn, probably in blue cloth. The Carnarvonshire companies had a distinctive white metal helmet plate consisting of a Maltese cross surmounted by a crown, with in the centre the Prince of Wales's feathers, coronet and motto surrounded by a circle inscribed 'CARNARVON RIFLE VOLUNTEERS'. The design of this centrepiece was also used in the waistbelt.

On becoming a VB of the Royal Welsh Fusiliers, the battalion adopted that regiment's uniform of scarlet with blue facings and a black racoon-skin 'Fusilier' cap for full dress. The 2nd and 3rd VBs retained the pouchbelt plate for officers and senior NCOs, the design comprising the Prince of Wales's insignia surrounded by a 'Union' wreath of roses and thistles, the upper arms of which supported a crown; across the lower part a scroll inscribed '2ND (or 3RD) V.B. ROYALWELSH FUSILIERS'. The cap badge was the Fusilier 'grenade' with the Prince of Wales's insignia on the ball; however, ca 1900 the other ranks of the 3rd VB had a cap badge with '3RD/V.B.' on the ball surrounded by a circle with the regimental title.

The uniform of the 6th Bn was that of the RWF. In 1908 Regimental Colours were authorised for TF battalions, the 6th Bn's carrying the single Battle Honour 'South Africa' 1900–02. In 1925 TA battalions were allowed the battle honours of their parent regiments; in addition the RWF battalions were granted the privilege of wearing the regiment's back flash (five black ribbons below the back of the collar). The battle honours were added when the battalion was presented with new colours on 6 August 1939.

When reformed as an LAA regiment it was rebadged as Royal Artillery and ceased to carry regimental colours. The regiment wore 95 (AA) AGRA's formation sign of a blue shield with a blue silhouette of an aircraft in a white semi-circle at the top, below which was an upright red shell decorated with a blue fuze and driving bands, all representing an AA shell in flight towards its target, an aircraft in the clouds. In 1953 the artillery regiment was authorised to resume the black five-ribboned RWF flash below the back collar of the No 1 dress and battledress, as well as the RWF cap badge and buttons.

== Memorials ==
The RWF's regimental memorial for World War I and World War II, a sculpted group by Sir William Goscombe John, stands at the junction of Bodhyfryd and Chester roads in Wrexham. A World War I memorial plaque to 1/6th Bn was placed in Christ Church, Caernarfon, and later moved to Caernarfon Barracks.

The original colours of the 6th Bn were laid up in St Cybi's Church, Holyhead, Anglesey, in 1959. The 1939 colours were deposited in Caernarfon Castle (now the location of the Royal Welch Fusiliers Museum) in 1951 after the battalion was converted to artillery.
