= Gerard Bucknall =

British Army general (1894–1980)

Lieutenant-General Gerard Bucknall CB MC* DL
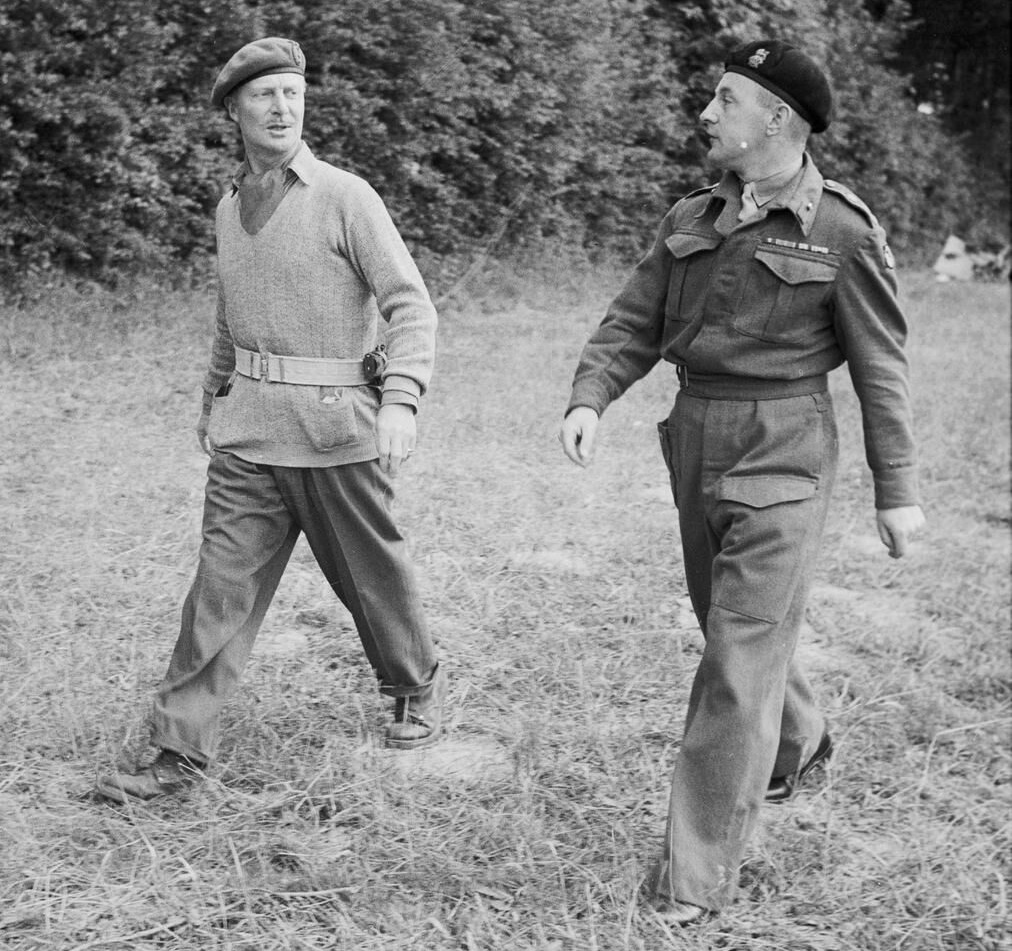
- Lieutenant-General Bucknall (left) with Brigadier Harold Pyman in Normandy, 1944.
- Born: 14 September 1894; Rock Ferry, Cheshire, England
- Died: 7 December 1980 (aged 86); Cheam, London Borough of Sutton, England
- Military career
- Allegiance: United Kingdom
- Branch: British Army
- Service years: 1914–1948
- Rank: Lieutenant-General
- Nickname: "Gerry"
- Service number: 5026
- Unit: Middlesex Regiment
- Commands: Northern Ireland District (1944–1947); XXX Corps (1944); 5th Infantry Division (1943–1944); I Corps (1943); XI Corps (1942–1943); 53rd (Welsh) Infantry Division (1941–1942); 138th Infantry Brigade (1940–1941); 2nd Battalion, Middlesex Regiment (1939)
- Conflicts: First World War; Second World War
- Awards: Companion of the Order of the Bath; Military Cross & Bar; Mentioned in Despatches

Lieutenant-General Gerard Corfield Bucknall, CB, MC & Bar, DL (14 September 1894 – 7 December 1980) was a senior British Army officer who served in both the First and Second World Wars. He is most notable for being the commander of XXX Corps during the Normandy landings and the subsequent Battle of Normandy which followed in the summer of 1944.

== Early life and First World War ==
Gerard Bucknall was born on 14 September 1894 in Rock Ferry, Cheshire, England, the son of Harry Corfield Bucknall and Alice Frederica, daughter of Thomas William Oakshott, JP, of Derby House, Rock Ferry. He was educated at Repton School and West Downs School. Entering the Royal Military College, Sandhurst in 1913, Bucknall was commissioned as a second lieutenant into the Middlesex Regiment on 25 February 1914.

During the First World War Bucknall, promoted to the temporary rank of lieutenant on 5 October 1914 (made permanent on 11 December 1914), served with the 1st Battalion, Middlesex in France and Belgium with some distinction, in particular during the Battle of the Somme on 25 August 1916 where he took command of the battalion and was awarded the Military Cross (MC). The citation for the MC reads:

For conspicuous gallantry in action. When his senior officers had become casualties, he went up and down the line cheering and reorganising his men in face of very heavy fire.

From 6 June 1917 he served as a brigade major with the 114th Infantry Brigade, part of the 38th (Welsh) Division, until war's end, and in 1918 he was awarded a Bar to his MC and mentioned in despatches.

== Between the wars ==
During the interwar period Bucknall served initially with his old battalion in Germany, the Egyptian Army (Egypt was then de facto part of the British Empire). He then returned to the 1st Middlesex and remained with the battalion until he attended the Staff College, Camberley from 1928 to 1929. His fellow students there included John Harding, Gerald Templer, Richard McCreery, Gordon MacMillan and Alexander Galloway. After returning to his regiment he was made a GSO3 at the War Office from 21 January 1931, until 30 August 1932, when he returned to the Royal Military College, Sandhurst, to command a company of gentlemen cadets.

Bucknall was promoted to brevet lieutenant colonel on 1 January 1936, and attended the Royal Naval College, Greenwich. From 13 March 1937 until 12 April 1939 he served as an instructor at the Royal Military College of Canada, taking over from Gordon MacMillan, where he came into contact with some of the Canadian generals of the next war, such as Harry Crerar, the college Commandant, and E. L. M. Burns and Guy Simonds, both fellow instructors. He returned to the United Kingdom in 1939 and became CO of the 2nd Battalion, Middlesex Regiment. He was only with the battalion for a few short months, however, before receiving promotion to colonel on 1 August (with seniority backdating to 1 January 1939) and being made an Assistant Quartermaster-General at the War Office.

== Second World War ==
Bucknall was still in this post by the outbreak of the Second World War, in September 1939, by the time the British Expeditionary Force (BEF) left for France. He then commanded the 138th Infantry Brigade and, promoted to acting major general on 29 July 1941, was appointed General Officer Commanding (GOC) 53rd (Welsh) Infantry Division, taking over from Major General Bevil Wilson. His rank of major general was made temporary on 29 July 1942. He was promoted to the acting rank of lieutenant general on 12 September 1942 and succeeded Lieutenant General John Crocker as GOC XI Corps in East Anglia. He held this command until April 1943 when he succeeded Lieutenant General Frederick Morgan as GOC of I Corps, which was earmarked as an assault formation for the invasion of Normandy. With the 3rd Canadian Division and the British 3rd and 49th (West Riding) Infantry Divisions, along with, under command, I Corps . He was made a Companion of the Order of the Bath (CB) on 2 June 1943.

Frustrated at training troops and wishing to command them in battle in an overseas theatre of war, he requested demotion in rank, to temporary major general, so he could command a division. Sent to the Mediterranean theatre, his chance came on 3 August 1943 when he became GOC of the 5th Infantry Division in succession to Major-General Horatio Berney-Ficklin, who had been in command for over three years. The division was then fighting in Sicily, which had been invaded the month before by the Allies, and was serving as part of the British Eighth Army, commanded by General Sir Bernard Montgomery, who had been one of Bucknall's instructors at the Staff College. Bucknall led the division during the final stages of the campaign in Sicily, followed in September by the Allied invasion of Italy and in the early stages of the Italian campaign, including in the First Battle of Monte Cassino in January 1944. His rank of major general was made permanent on 21 December 1943.

Bucknall's relatively brief performance under his command had sufficiently impressed Montgomery, who in late December 1943 returned to the United Kingdom to take command of the 21st Army Group, and when he was chosen to command Operation Overlord, the Allied invasion of Normandy, he appointed Bucknall to command XXX Corps – Bucknall took command on 27 January 1944, and was made an acting lieutenant general. On 11 March his rank of lieutenant general was made temporary. The Chief of the Imperial General Staff (CIGS), Field Marshal Sir Alan Brooke, believed Bucknall to be unsuitable for command at that level.

In August 1944 Bucknall was sacked, due to the relatively poor performance of XXX Corps (see Operation Perch) and replaced by Lieutenant General Brian Horrocks. Montgomery conceded that it had been a mistake to appoint him and, in November 1944, Bucknall revert to his permanent rank of major general and was given command of Northern Ireland, a post he held until his retirement from the army on 4 March 1948. He was granted the honorary rank of lieutenant general.

== Postwar ==
In 1952 Bucknall was given the colonelcy of the Middlesex Regiment, a position he held until 1959. He died at the age of 86 on 7 December 1980 in a nursing home in Chegworth.

== Bibliography ==
- Alanbrooke, Field Marshal Lord (2001). Danchev, Alex; Todman, Daniel (eds.). War Diaries 1939–1945. Phoenix Press. ISBN 1-84212-526-5.
- Collins, James (1994). The D-Day Encyclopedia. Upper Saddle River, New Jersey: Helicon. ISBN 978-0132036214.
- D'Este, Carlo (2004) [1983]. Decision in Normandy: The Real Story of Montgomery and the Allied Campaign. London: Penguin. ISBN 978-0-14-101761-7. OCLC 44772546.
- Smart, Nick (2005). Biographical Dictionary of British Generals of the Second World War. Barnesley: Pen & Sword. ISBN 1844150496.

Military offices
Preceded by Bevil Wilson	GOC 53rd (Welsh) Infantry Division; 1941–1942	Succeeded by Robert Ross
Preceded by John Crocker	GOC XI Corps; 1942–1943	Succeeded by Gerald Templer
Preceded by Frederick Morgan	GOC I Corps; April–July 1943	Succeeded by John Crocker
Preceded by Horatio Berney-Ficklin	GOC 5th Infantry Division; 1943–1944	Succeeded by Philip Gregson-Ellis
Preceded by Sir Oliver Leese	GOC XXX Corps; January–July 1944	Succeeded by Brian Horrocks
Preceded by Sir Alan Cunningham	GOC Northern Ireland District; 1944–1948	Succeeded by Sir Ouvry Roberts
Honorary titles
Preceded by Maurice Browne	Colonel of the Middlesex Regiment (Duke of Cambridge's Own); 1952–1959	Succeeded by Sir John Willoughby
Preceded by Sir John Crocker	Lord Lieutenant of Middlesex; 1963–1965	Office abolished
