= Robert Ross (British Army officer, born 1893) =

General in the British Army

Major-General Robert Ross CB DSO MC
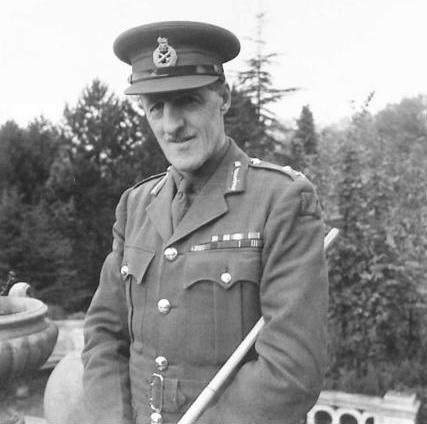
- Ross in 1942
- Born: 23 August 1893; Gibraltar
- Died: 3 November 1951 (aged 58); Regent's Park, London, England
- Burial place: Shalford Cemetery, Surrey, England
- Military career
- Allegiance: United Kingdom
- Branch: British Army
- Service years: 1913–1946
- Rank: Major-General
- Nicknames: "Bobby" "Willie"
- Service number: 5517
- Unit: Queen's (Royal West Surrey Regiment)
- Commands: Aldershot and Hampshire District (1945–1946); 53rd (Welsh) Infantry Division (1942–1945); 160th Infantry Brigade (1940–1942); 2nd Battalion, Queen's Royal Regiment (1937–1940)
- Conflicts: First World War; Arab Revolt in Palestine; Second World War
- Awards: Companion of the Order of the Bath; Distinguished Service Order; Military Cross; Mentioned in Despatches (3); Legion of Honour (France); Croix de guerre (France)

Major-General Robert Knox Ross, CB, DSO, MC (23 August 1893 – 3 November 1951) was a senior British Army officer who, during the Second World War, commanded the 53rd (Welsh) Infantry Division throughout the campaign in North-West Europe from June 1944 until May 1945.

== Early life and military career ==
Robert Knox Ross was born on 23 August 1893, the son of a British Army officer, Brigadier General Robert James Ross of the Middlesex Regiment, he was educated at Cheltenham College and the Royal Military College, Sandhurst. He graduated from Sandhurst and was commissioned as a second lieutenant into the Queen's (Royal West Surrey Regiment), the second most senior line infantry regiment of the British Army, on 5 February 1913. He served with the 2nd Battalion, Queen's in South Africa and Bermuda.

On the outbreak of the First World War, in August 1914, the battalion, stationed in Pretoria, was sent to England, arriving there in September, where it became part of the 22nd Brigade of the 7th Division. On 22 September Ross was promoted to lieutenant. The battalion was sent to the Western Front in October and Ross, commanding a platoon in 'A' Company, with his battalion, fought in the First Battle of Ypres, where he was one of the few officers not killed or wounded. On 22 October 1915, he was promoted to captain. Ross remained on the Western Front until 1916, upon promotion to the staff and becoming brigade major of the 27th Brigade, and later the 233rd Brigade in Palestine in the Middle Eastern theatre. In 1916 he became a General Staff Officer Grade 2 (GSO2) with the 60th (2/2nd London) Division, part of the Egyptian Expeditionary Force (EEF). He ended the war in 1918 having been awarded the Distinguished Service Order (DSO), in January 1918, Military Cross (MC) in February 1915, and was thrice mentioned in despatches.

== Between the wars ==
Remaining in the British Army during the interwar period, he served as adjutant of the 2nd Battalion, Queen's Royal Regiment in India from 14 May 1919 until September 1923. He was seconded to the Egyptian Army and the Sudan Defence Force (SDF) for almost a decade, from 21 September 1923 until 1932. He married Kathleen Ogden in 1933 and, in 1937, he was promoted to lieutenant colonel and assumed command of the 2nd Battalion of his regiment, then serving in Palestine during the Arab revolt, for which he was awarded his fourth mention in despatches. While there he first met Major General Bernard Montgomery, General Officer Commanding (GOC) of the 8th Division, of which the 2nd Queen's formed part of, serving in the 14th Brigade. Unlike many others who later became senior commanders, Ross did not attend the staff colleges at either Camberley or Quetta. He was mentioned in despatches for his services in Palestine in September 1939.

== Second World War ==
Still serving in Palestine upon the outbreak of the Second World War, the battalion moved, in January 1940, to Brigadier Cyril Lomax's 16th Brigade. In April he returned to the United Kingdom and, on 24 April, was promoted to the acting rank of brigadier, and took command of the 160th Infantry Brigade, a Territorial Army (TA) formation then serving in Northern Ireland with its parent unit, the 53rd (Welsh) Infantry Division, then commanded by Major General Bevil Wilson.

On 12 September 1942, promoted to acting major general, he became the GOC of the 53rd Division, succeeding Major General Gerard Bucknall. His rank of major general was made temporary on 12 September 1943, and permanent on 12 December 1944 (with seniority backdated to 3 February 1944)

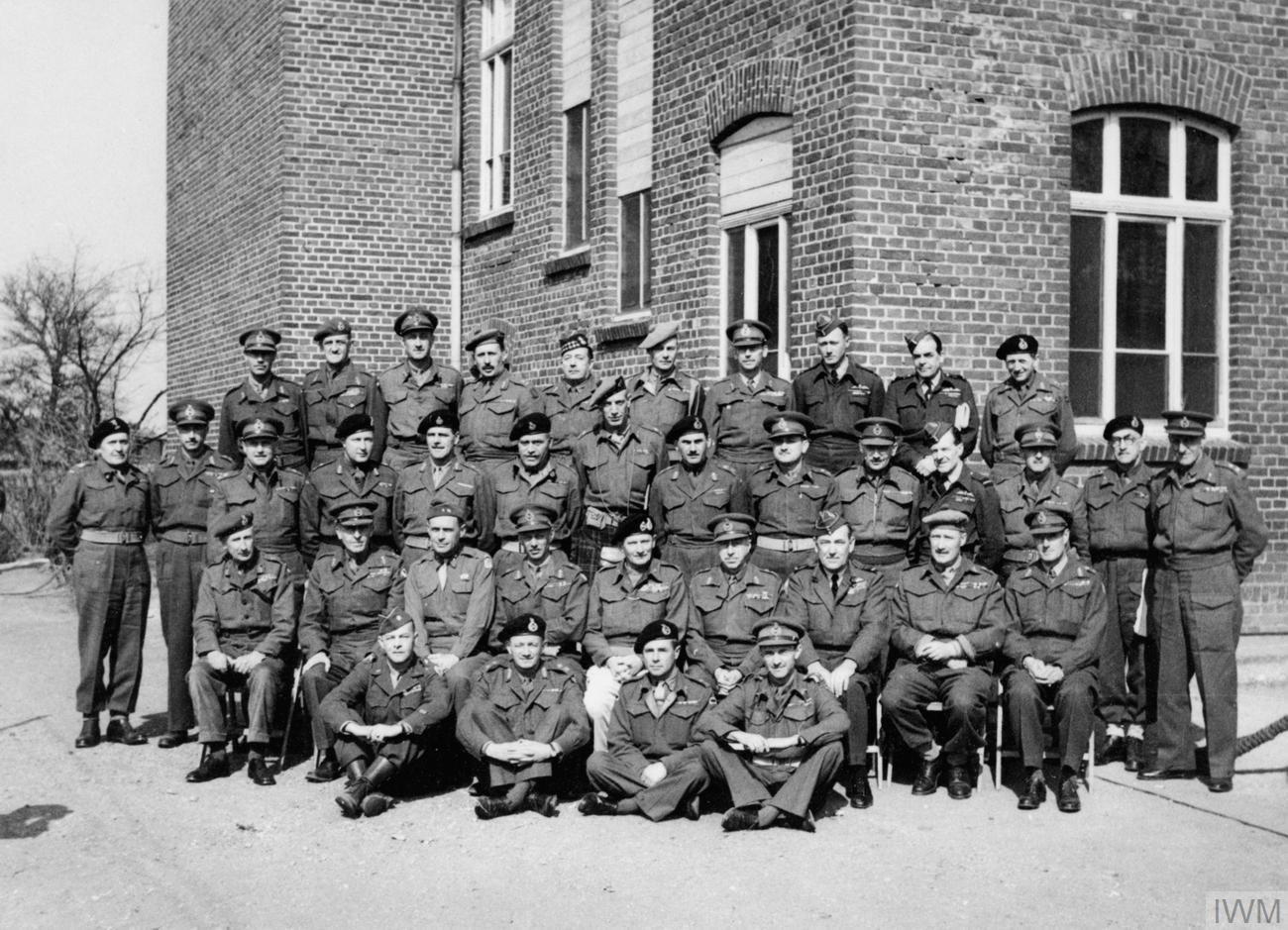
Field Marshal Sir Bernard Montgomery poses for a group photograph with members of his staff, along with his army, corps and division commanders, at Walbeck, Germany, 22 March 1945. Pictured standing in the third row, on the furthest right, is Major General Robert Knox Ross.

Ross trained the division in England for the next 21 months, leading it with great success during Operation Overlord, codename for the Allied invasion of Normandy, in the summer of 1944. His 53rd Division sustained heavy casualties in the Battle for Caen and the battles that followed, but by the end of the campaign in Normandy had captured some 3,500 German troops as prisoners of war (POWs). The division then, in the aftermath of the Battle of Falaise (where Captain Tasker Watkins of the 1/5th Battalion, Welch Regiment was awarded the division's only Victoria Cross of the war), took part in the pursuit of the retreating German forces during the Allied advance from Paris to the Rhine, entering the Netherlands and playing a relatively minor role in Operation Market Garden, capturing the town of 's-Hertogenbosch, later being one of the few British divisions to play a part in the Battle of the Bulge. In February 1945 the division played a significant role in Operation Veritable (Battle of the Reichswald), later crossing the River Rhine in March and taking part in the Western Allied invasion of Germany, eventually ending the war in Hamburg in May. He continued to command the division in the Allied occupation of Germany. Ross was made a Companion of the Order of the Bath (CB) on 1 February 1945.

== Postwar years ==
For his services in North-West Europe, Ross was appointed a Companion of the Order of the Bath in 1945, and awarded the French Legion of Honour and the Croix de guerre, the latter two in 1944. In November 1945, after three years as GOC, he relinquished command of the 53rd Division. The division historian described "the departure of General Ross" as a "sad event." Ross "had been associated with the Division since May 1940, first as Commander of the 160th Brigade, and from September 1942 as Divisional Commander. He was one of the few who held the same command from the time of the early fighting in Normandy until the German surrender. The uninterrupted successes of the Division during nearly a year of continuous fighting were the measures of the qualities of this fine officer." He then commanded the Aldershot and Hampshire District in Southeast England before his retirement from the British Army in December 1946. He died suddenly on 3 November 1951, at the age of 58.

== Personality ==
Despite being not nearly as well known as other senior British commanders, General Sir Charles Harington, then CO of the 1st Battalion, Manchester Regiment, who later became GSO1, claimed Ross was "popular with everyone" and a "Father figure to the troops." H. C. Kenway, then a junior staff officer, described Ross as "confident and impressive and greatly respected as a commander", although he "was not charismatic like many other generals and was rather reserved and introspective by nature. In my experience he was always courteous, never overbearing and never tried to impress as a great 'character' like a Monty, a Patton or a Horrocks. He was ruthless when necessary, as all successful commanders need to be at times, but I do not think he was ever unfair."

== Bibliography ==
- Barclay, C. N. (1956). The History of the 53rd (Welsh) Division in the Second World War. London: Wm. Clowes & Sons. OCLC 36762829.
- Delaforce, P. (2015) [1996]. Red Crown & Dragon: 53rd Welsh Division in North-West Europe 1944–1945 (Thistle ed.). Brighton: Tom Donovan. ISBN 978-1-91019-863-6.
- Devine, Louis Paul (2015). The British Way of War in Northwest Europe 1944−5: A Study of Two Infantry Divisions. Bloomsbury Publishing. ISBN 978-1-4742-2564-9.
- Smart, Nick (2005). Biographical Dictionary of British Generals of the Second World War. Barnesley: Pen & Sword. ISBN 1844150496.

Military offices
Preceded by Gerard Bucknall	GOC 53rd (Welsh) Infantry Division; 1942–1945	Succeeded by Francis Matthews
Preceded by Henry Curtis	GOC-in-C Aldershot and Hampshire District; 1945–1946	Succeeded by Noel Holmes
