= James Dick-Cunyngham =

British Army general

Major-General James Dick-Cunyngham CB CMG DSO
- Born: 28 March 1877; Cheltenham, Gloucestershire
- Died: 6 November 1935 (aged 58); Colchester, Essex
- Military career
- Allegiance: United Kingdom
- Branch: British Army
- Service years: 1898–1935
- Rank: Major-General
- Commands: South-Eastern Command; 4th Division; 152nd (Seaforth and Cameron) Infantry Brigade
- Conflicts: First World War
- Awards: Companion of the Order of the Bath; Companion of the Order of St Michael and St George; Distinguished Service Order

Major-General James Keith Dick-Cunyngham, CB, CMG, DSO (28 March 1877 – 6 November 1935) was a British Army officer who commanded the 4th Division in 1935.

== Military career ==
Officers of the Gordon Highlanders, presumably during the First World War. Dick-Cunyngham is in the second row on the extreme left.

Educated at Cheltenham College, Dick-Cunyngham was commissioned into the Gordon Highlanders in 1898.

He served in the Second Boer War and was awarded the Distinguished Service Order (DSO), which he received from King Edward VII in an investiture at St. James′s Palace on 2 June 1902.

He later served in the First World War, being made a brigade major on 30 September 1914. He was general officer commanding (GOC) of the 152nd (Seaforth and Cameron) Infantry Brigade, 51st (Highland) Division, on 7 April 1918, and was granted the temporary rank of brigadier general while employed in this role, before being taken as a prisoner of war (POW) at Le Cornet Malo in Northern France later that same month.

After the war he became an Assistant Adjutant General at the War Office, then commanded the British troops in France and Flanders until November 1921. He was placed on half-pay on 2 November 1926 and was appointed commander of the 152nd (Seaforth and Cameron) Infantry Brigade again in 1927 and then took a tour as Brigadier on the General Staff at Southern Command in India.

On 13 April 1930 he was appointed as an personal aide-de-camp to King George V, taking over from Colonel Winston Dugan. He was promoted to major general on 15 January 1932 and became general officer commanding (GOC) of the 53rd (Welsh) Division, Territorial Army (TA), on 8 December. His last appointment was as GOC of the 4th Division in June 1935 before his death in November.

== Family ==
In 1905 Dick-Cunyngham married Alice Daisy Deane, daughter of Sir Harold Arthur Deane and sister of Lady Humphrys. They had two daughters.

Military offices
Preceded by Charles Grant	GOC 53rd (Welsh) Infantry Division; 1932–1935	Succeeded by Gervase Thorpe
Preceded by John Brind	GOC 4th Division; June–November 1935	Succeeded by Clive Liddell
