= XI Corps (United Kingdom) =

- XI Corps formation badge First World War (left) and Second World War (right).
- Active: 1915–1919; 1940–1943
- Country: United Kingdom
- Branch: British Army
- Type: Corps
- Engagements: First World War: Battle of Fromelles; Italian Campaign; Battle of the Lys; The Advance in Flanders; The Final Advance in Artois

Commanders
- Notable commanders: Sir Richard Haking

XI Corps was a corps-sized formation of the British Expeditionary Force, active during the First World War that served on the Western Front and in Italy. It was recreated as part of Home Forces defending the United Kingdom during the Second World War.

== First World War ==
=== Western Front ===
XI Corps was formed in France on 29 August 1915 under Lieutenant-General Richard Haking. Its first serious engagement (as part of the First Army, Sir Charles Monro) was the Battle of Fromelles (19 July 1916), a diversion to the Somme offensive in which two untried divisions were launched into an ill-planned subsidiary attack in Flanders. It achieved nothing but cost thousands of casualties and caused great resentment in Australia.

Order of Battle at Fromelles

General Officer Commanding Lieutenant-General Richard Haking

- 61st (2nd South Midland) Division
- 5th Australian Division

=== Italian Front ===
XI Corps was one of two corps HQs moved to the Italian Front in November 1917.

Order of Battle in Italy 1 December 1917

GOC Lieutenant-General Sir Richard Haking

Corps Troops:

- 1/1st King Edward's Horse
- HQ Corps Heavy Artillery Royal Garrison Artillery (RGA)
- 11th Cyclist Battalion Army Cyclist Corps
- Corps Topographical Section Royal Engineers (RE)
- Signal Troops RE (L Corps Signal Company; 27 (Motor) Airline Section; R and LC Cable Sections, *Corps Heavy Artillery Signal Section RGA)
- Corps Siege Park Army Service Corps (ASC)
- Corps Ammunition Park (345 (MT) Company (25 Ammunition Sub-Park) ASC)
- 491 (MT) Company ASC, attached Corps Heavy Artillery
- 5th (Light) Mobile Workshop Army Ordnance Corps (AOC)
- Area Employment Company
- Corps School

=== Return to the Western Front ===
XI Corps returned to the Western Front in March 1918 in time to take part in the defence against the German spring offensive (the Battle of the Lys) and the final battles of the war as part of the Fifth Army (Sir William Birdwood).

==== Order of Battle 27 September 1918 ====
===== Corps Headquarters Command Staff =====
- GOC Lt-Gen Sir Richard Haking
- Brigadier-General, General Staff: Brig-Gen John Brind
- Deputy Adjutant & Quartermaster-General: Brigadier-General Arthur Green
- Assistant Director Ordnance Services, Lt Col Alfred Herbert, NZAOC
- Commander, Royal Artillery: Brig-Gen S.F. Metcalfe
- Commander, Heavy Artillery: Brig-Gen F.A. Twiss
- Commander, Engineers: Brig-Gen H.J.M. Marshall

===== Divisions attached to XI Corps =====
- 19th (Western) Division (to Third Army 4 October)
- 47th (1/2nd London) Division (to III Corps 13 October)
- 57th (2nd West Lancashire) Division (from Third Army 11 October)
- 59th (2nd North Midland) Division
- 61st (2nd South Midland) Division (to Third Army 5 October)
- 74th (Yeomanry) Division (from Fourth Army 2 October; to III Corps 8 October)

== Second World War ==
XI Corps was reformed in the United Kingdom early in the Second World War. It was based at Bishop's Stortford in Hertfordshire with a major operational base at Felsted School.

Order of Battle Autumn 1940

- 15th (Scottish) Infantry Division
- 55th (West Lancashire) Infantry Division
- Royal Artillery
  - 147th (Essex Yeomanry) Regiment, Royal Horse Artillery
  - 72nd Medium Regiment

== General Officers Commanding ==
Commanders included:

- 29 August – 4 September 1915 Major-General the Earl of Cavan (temporary)
- 4 September 1915 – 13 August 1916 Lieutenant-General Richard Haking
- 13 August – 30 September 1916 Lieutenant-General Sir Charles Anderson
- 30 September 1916 – 1919 Lieutenant-General Sir Richard Haking
- July 1940 – November 1941 Lieutenant-General Hugh Massy
- November 1941 – March 1942 Lieutenant-General Noel Irwin
- March–September 1942 Lieutenant-General John Crocker
- September 1942 – April 1943 Lieutenant-General Gerard Bucknall
- April–July 1943 Lieutenant-General Gerald Templer

== External sources ==
- The Long Long Trail
- Royal Artillery 1939-45
