= Gervase Thorpe =

Major-General Gervase Thorpe CB CMG DSO & Bar
- Thorpe with his wife Margaret (née Burt-Marshall) on their wedding day in 1917
- Born: 10 August 1877; Argyll, Scotland
- Died: 4 October 1962 (aged 85)
- Military career
- Allegiance: United Kingdom
- Branch: British Army
- Service years: 1897–1939; 1940
- Rank: Major-General
- Unit: Argyll and Sutherland Highlanders
- Conflicts: Second Boer War; First World War
- Awards: Companion of the Order of the Bath; Companion of the Order of St Michael and St George; Distinguished Service Order& Bar; Mentioned in Despatches (8)

Major-General Gervase Thorpe, CB, CMG, DSO & Bar (10 August 1877 – 4 October 1962) was a senior officer in the British Army.

== Early life ==
Gervase Thorpe was born on 10 August 1877, the fifth son of Colonel James Thorpe (1823–1902) of Coddington Hall in Nottinghamshire and of Ardbrecknish in Argyllshire, by his second wife, Annie (died 1929), eldest daughter of John MacDougall, of Lunga in Argyllshire. In 1917, he married Margaret, daughter of James Burt-Marshall, of Luncarty in Perthshire. They had two sons: Ian (killed in action in 1944) and Ivor Lawrence (died 1958).

== Military career ==
Following schooling at Eton College, Thorpe was commissioned into the British Army on 8 September 1897 as a second lieutenant in the Argyll and Sutherland Highlanders. He was promoted to the rank of lieutenant on 16 July 1899 and served in the Second Boer War; wounded, he received the Queen's and King's South Africa Medals with clasps for service at the battles of Modder River and Pandaardeberg, and in Transvaal and South Africa (1901 and 1902). On 15 October 1901, he was posted as a Station Staff Officer.

Promoted to captain in October 1904, Thorpe served in France during the First World War, initially as a deputy assistant quartermaster general (August and September 1914) and then as an aide-de-camp to a divisional commander until October 1914. He served as an adjutant between November 1914 and February 1915, after which he was a brigade major until September of that year. On 1 September 1915, he was promoted to the rank of major and on 9 September was posted as a general staff officer (GSO) of the 2nd Division; he was moved to the 46th (North Midland) Division as its general staff officer, grade 1 in June 1916, taking over from Archibald Fraser Home, and being made a temporary lieutenant colonel while in this position. Promoted to brevet lieutenant colonel on 1 January 1917, Thorpe remained as a GSO until 7 June 1918, when he became a brigade commander with the temporary rank of brigadier general.

He relinquished that position on 1 September 1919, became a temporary lieutenant colonel in the 3rd Battalion of the Royal Highlanders (May to August 1919) and took a promotion as brevet colonel on 3 June 1919, which became substantive on 31 August the following year.

A posting to the War Office as Assistant Adjutant General in January 1920 lasted until 25 April 1923. On that day, Thorpe was appointed a brigade commander in the Second Command, a post he held until 16 November 1925 when he was transferred of the Rhine Army as a staff officer. He left that role at the end of October 1927 to become commander of the 3rd Infantry Brigade in the Aldershot Command. In May 1931, he moved again, this time to be Deputy Adjutant General in India and on 1 March 1931 he was promoted to major general and was placed on half-pay in June. In June 1935, he became General Officer Commanding of the 53rd (Welsh) Infantry Division (one of the divisional commands at Western Command), and between 1937 and 1945 he was Colonel of his regiment. Having retired in 1939, Thorpe was brought back into employment in 1940 and served as commandant of the Cherbourg Base.

Thorpe was appointed a Companion of the Order of the Bath in 1931, a Companion of the Order of St Michael and St George in 1918 and received the Distinguished Service Order with a Bar during the First World War, when he was also mentioned in despatches eight times. He died on 4 October 1962.

Military offices
Preceded by James Dick-Cunyngham	GOC 53rd (Welsh) Infantry Division; 1935–1939	Succeeded by Bevil Wilson
