= Francis Matthews (British Army officer) =

British Army general (1903–1976)

Major-General Francis Matthews CB DSO
- Born: 26 January 1903
- Died: 26 May 1976 (aged 73); Warminster, Wiltshire, England
- Military career
- Allegiance: United Kingdom
- Branch: British Army
- Service years: 1923–1955
- Rank: Major-General
- Service number: 24375
- Units: York and Lancaster Regiment; South Wales Borderers
- Commands: 1st Infantry Division (1950–52); British Forces in Hong Kong (1948–1949); Royal Military Academy Sandhurst (1946–1948); 53rd (Welsh) Infantry Division (1945–1946); 185th Infantry Brigade (1945); 13th Infantry Brigade (1944); 168th Infantry Brigade (1944); 1st Battalion, South Wales Borderers (1941)
- Conflicts: Arab revolt in Palestine; Second World War
- Awards: Companion of the Order of the Bath; Distinguished Service Order; Mentioned in Despatches (2)

Francis Raymond Gage Matthews (26 January 1903 – 26 May 1976) was a British Army officer who was active in the Second World War and later was Commander of British Forces in Hong Kong.

== Military career ==
After graduating from the Royal Military College, Sandhurst, Matthews was commissioned into the York and Lancaster Regiment on 1 February 1923. He transferred to the South Wales Borderers in 1935 while aide-de-camp to the Governor and Commander-in-Chief of Malta. He served in Palestine during the Arab revolt in Palestine, for which he was later mentioned in despatches, before returning to the United Kingdom where he attended the Staff College, Camberley, from 1937 to 1938.

Matthews served in the Second World War, initially as a General Staff Officer and then as commanding officer of a battalion within the Mediterranean Expeditionary Force. He went on to become Director of Military Training for the Middle East in 1943, commander of the 168th Brigade in May 1944 and then commander of the 13th Brigade in Italy in September 1944. After that he became commander of the 185th Brigade in North West Europe in January 1945 and then General Officer Commanding 53rd (Welsh) Infantry Division in Germany in November 1945.

After the war Matthews became Commandant of the Royal Military Academy Sandhurst in June 1946, Commander of British Forces in Hong Kong in June 1948 and President of the Regular Commissions Board at the War Office in August 1949. He went on to be General Officer Commanding 1st Infantry Division on 2 December 1950, Director of Infantry at the War Office in December 1952 and Director of Civil Defence for Wales in 1956. His last appointments were as Commandant of the Civil Defence Staff College in 1956 and Director of Civil Defence for the South West Region in 1960. Matthews was also Colonel of the South Wales Borderers from 1954 to 1961.

Military offices
Preceded by Robert Ross	General Officer Commanding 53rd (Welsh) Infantry Division; 1945–1946	Succeeded by George Richards
New post Academy in alternative use during the war	Commandant of the Royal Military Academy Sandhurst; 1947–1948	Succeeded by Hugh Stockwell
Preceded by Sir George Erskine	Commander of British Forces in Hong Kong; 1948–1949	Succeeded by Sir Francis Festing
Preceded by Horatius Murray	General Officer Commanding 1st Infantry Division; 1950–1952	Succeeded by Thomas Brodie
Honorary titles
Preceded by Sir Reade Godwin-Austen	Colonel of the South Wales Borderers; 1954–1961	Succeeded by Sir David Yates
