= Charles Deedes =

British Army general (1879–1969)

General Sir Charles Deedes KCB CMG DSO
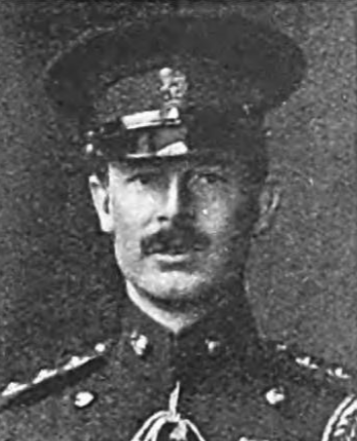
- Born: 9 August 1879
- Died: 9 March 1969 (aged 89)
- Military career
- Allegiance: United Kingdom
- Branch: British Army
- Service years: 1899–1937
- Rank: General
- Service number: 854
- Unit: King's Own Yorkshire Light Infantry
- Commands: 3rd Infantry Brigade; 53rd (Welsh) Division
- Conflicts: Second Boer War; World War I World War II
- Awards: Knight Commander of the Order of the Bath; Companion of the Order of St Michael and St George; Distinguished Service Order

General Sir Charles Parker Deedes, KCB, CMG, DSO (9 August 1879 – 9 March 1969) was a senior British Army officer who served as Military Secretary.

== Early life ==
Deedes was born at Nether Broughton, Leicestershire, the son of the Revd Philip Deedes and educated at Winchester College and the Royal Military College, Sandhurst.

== Military career ==
Deedes was commissioned into the King's Own Yorkshire Light Infantry (KOYLI) as a second lieutenant in February 1899, and promoted to lieutenant on 4 November 1899, later antedated to 9 October 1899.

He served in the 2nd Battalion, which was transferred to South Africa following the outbreak of the Second Boer War that month. For his service in the war, he was appointed a Companion of the Distinguished Service Order (DSO) in the October 1902 South African honours list.

After the war ended in June 1902, he returned to regular service with his regiment, and transferred with the battalion to Malta, for which he left Point Natal on the SS Staffordshire in October.

He also served in World War I initially, from February 1915, as a general staff officer, grade 2 at the General Headquarters of the British Expeditionary Force and, after being promoted to major on 1 September 1915, then from 1916 with 14th Army Corps and from 1917 as a General Staff Officer with 2nd Division in France. He was promoted on 1 January 1918 to brevet colonel.

After the War he was appointed Deputy Director of Staff Duties at the War Office. In 1926 he became Commander of 3rd Infantry Brigade and in 1928 he was made General Officer Commanding 53rd (Welsh) Division. He became Director of Personal Services at the War Office in 1930 and Military Secretary in 1934.

He retired from the army on 12 October 1937. He was promoted to general and held the colonelcy of the King's Own Yorkshire Light Infantry from 1927 to 1947.

During World War II he was an Area Commander for the Home Guard.

== Family ==
He married Eve Mary Dean-Pitt and they went on to have a son (Major-General Charles Julius Deedes) and a daughter, Mary Josephine Deedes.

Honorary titles
Preceded by Sir Arthur Wynne	Colonel of the King's Own Yorkshire Light Infantry; 1927–1947	Succeeded by William Robb
Military offices
Preceded by Thomas Cubitt	GOC 53rd (Welsh) Infantry Division; 1928–1930	Succeeded by Charles Grant
Preceded by Sir Sidney Clive	Military Secretary; 1934–1937	Succeeded by Viscount Gort
