= 53rd (Welsh) Infantry Division =

World War-era British Army formation

Welsh Division 53rd (Welsh) Division 53rd (Welsh) Infantry Division
- Formation patch of the 53rd (Welsh) Division, Second World War
- Active: 1908–1919; 1920–1945
- Country: United Kingdom
- Branch: Territorial Army
- Type: Infantry
- Size: Division
- Peacetime HQ: Shrewsbury
- Engagements: First World War: Gallipoli Campaign; First Battle of Gaza; Second World War: Battle of Normandy; Falaise Pocket; Battle of the Bulge; Battle of the Reichswald
- Battle honours: First World War: Battle of Gallipoli; Battle of Sari Bair; First Battle of Gaza; Battle of Beersheba (1917); Battle of Mughar Ridge; Battle of Jerusalem (1917); Battle of Megiddo (1918); Second World War: Battle of Normandy; Battle of Falaise; Battle of the Bulge; Battle of the Reichswald; Crossing of the Rhine

Commanders
- Notable commanders: Archibald Montgomery-Massingberd; Gerard Bucknall; Robert Knox Ross

The 53rd (Welsh) Infantry Division was an infantry division of the British Army that fought in both the First and Second World Wars. Originally raised in 1908 as the Welsh Division, part of the Territorial Force (TF), the division saw service in First World War, being designated 53rd (Welsh) Division in mid-1915, and fought in the Gallipoli Campaign and in the Middle East. Remaining active in the Territorial Army (TA) during the interwar period as a peacetime formation, the division again saw action in Second World War, fighting in North-western Europe from June 1944 until May 1945.

The 53rd Division was temporarily disbanded at the end of the war, but was reactivated in 1947 when the Territorial Army was reformed and reorganised. In 1968, the division was finally deactivated, but its 160th Brigade remains in service today. As the name suggests, the division recruited mainly in Wales, but also in Herefordshire, Shropshire and Cheshire.

== Formation ==
The Territorial Force (TF) was formed on 1 April 1908 following the enactment of the Territorial and Reserve Forces Act 1907 (7 Edw.7, c.9) which combined and re-organised the old Volunteer Force, the Honourable Artillery Company and the Yeomanry. On formation, the TF contained 14 infantry divisions and 14 mounted yeomanry brigades. One of the divisions was the Welsh Division. In peacetime, the divisional headquarters was, from 1909, at 3 Belmont in Shrewsbury.

== First World War ==
The Welsh Division was mobilised upon Britain's entrance into the First World War in early August 1914.

In 1915, the Welsh Division was numbered as the 53rd (Welsh) Division and the brigades became, respectively, the 158th (North Wales) Brigade, the 159th (Cheshire) Brigade and the 160th (Welsh Border) Brigade. Some original battalions were detached early in the First World War to reinforce other divisions.

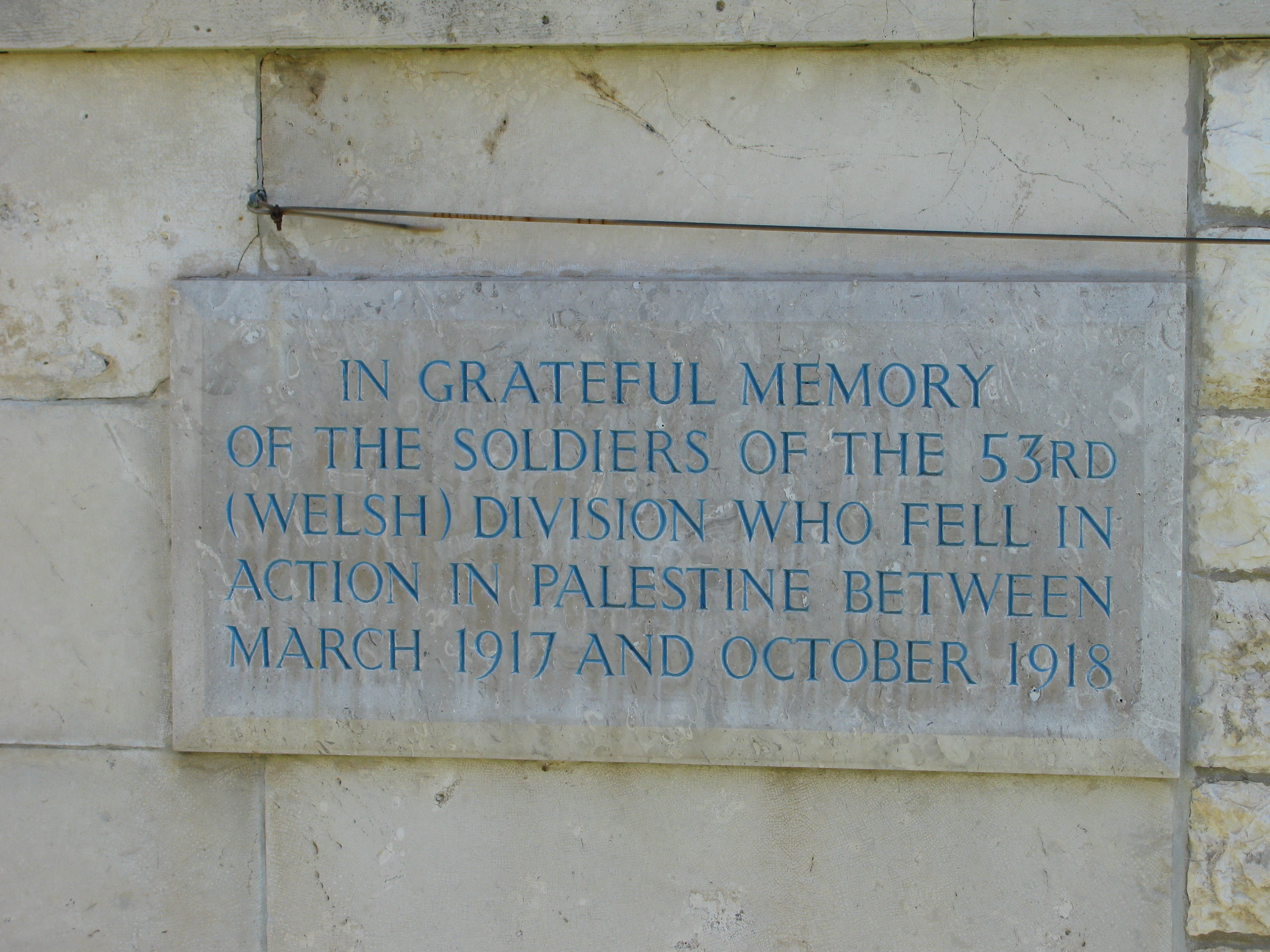
53rd (Welsh) Division commemoration plaque - Ramleh military cemetery.

The division sailed from Devonport, bound for Gallipoli via Imbros (now Gökçeada) on 19 July 1915 and landed at Suvla Bay on the Gallipoli Peninsula on 9 August 1915. The division was evacuated from Gallipoli during December 1915 and moved to Egypt. The evacuation was forced by a combination of combat, disease and harsh weather which saw the division reduced to just 162 officers and 2,428 men, approximately 15% of full strength.

On 26 March 1917, the 53rd (Welsh) Division bore the brunt of the First Battle of Gaza where the three brigades, along with the 161st (Essex) Brigade of the 54th (East Anglian) Division, had to advance across exposed ground, withstanding shrapnel, machine gun and rifle fire, to capture the Turkish fortifications. Despite gaining the advantage towards the end of the day, the British commander, Lieutenant-General Philip Chetwode called off the attack so that the division's casualties, were suffered in vain.

Other division actions included the Battle of Romani in August 1916, the Battle of El Buggar Ridge in October 1917 and the action of Tell 'Asur in March 1918.

== Between the wars ==
The division was disbanded after the war, along with the rest of the Territorial Force which was reformed in the 1920s as the Territorial Army, and created on a similar basis to the Territorial Force and the 53rd Division was reformed. The division saw a great change in its units between the wars.

== Second World War ==
=== 1939 ===
The Territorial Army and the 53rd (Welsh) Division, commanded by Major-General Bevil Wilson serving under Western Command, was mobilised on 1 September 1939, the day the German Army invaded Poland, and two days later the Second World War officially began. The early days of the war for the 53rd Division were spent in training the divisions' 2nd Line duplicate, the 38th (Welsh) Infantry Division, created earlier in the year, and containing many former members and much equipment, of the 53rd Division. In October, just over a month after the war began, most of the 53rd Division was sent to Northern Ireland, coming under command of British Troops Northern Ireland.

=== 1940–1941 ===
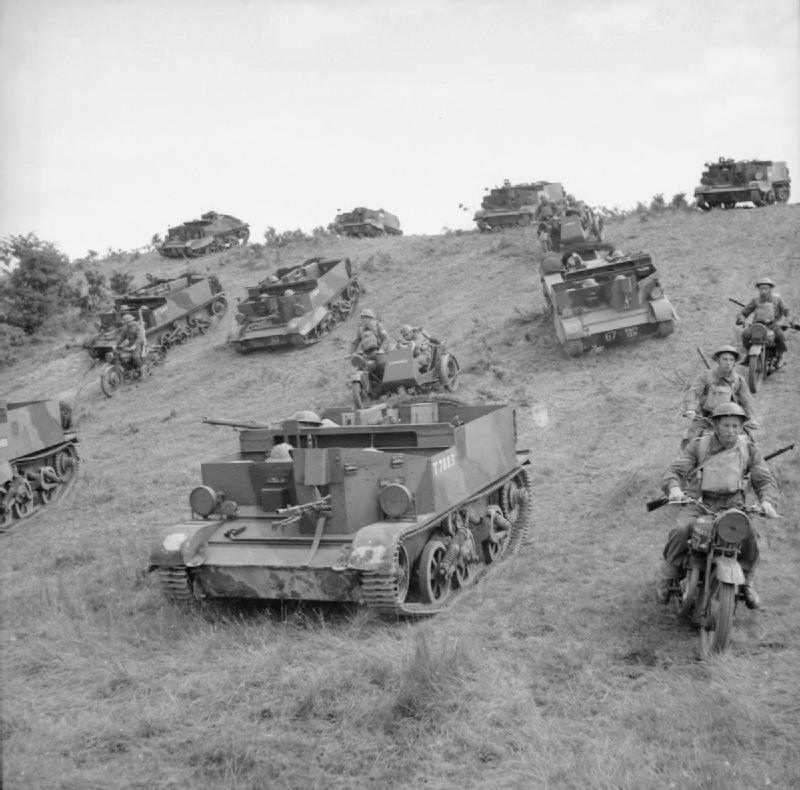
Universal Carriers and motorcycles of the 1/4th Battalion, Welch Regiment, on manoeuvres at Keady in County Armagh, Northern Ireland, 22 July 1941.

After the British Expeditionary Force (BEF) in France and Belgium was evacuated from Dunkirk in mid-1940, the threat grew of a German invasion of Northern Ireland. The 61st Infantry Division arrived to help defend it, with the 53rd Division charged with responsibility for the southern half of Ulster and the 61st Division the northern. The divisions came under the command of III Corps. In March 1941, the garrison was reinforced with the 5th Infantry Division, a Regular Army formation that had fought in France in 1940. The 53rd Division took part in many exercises, training by battalion, brigade, division and corps level. "It was a very different 53rd Division which returned to near its own countryside in November 1941, from the comparatively untrained one which had moved to Ireland in driblets between October 1939 and April 1940." The 53rd Division, now commanded by Major-General Gerard Bucknall, returned to the Welsh Border counties again in November 1941, with the divisional HQ based in Whitchurch, Shropshire.

=== 1942–1943 ===
The division was again serving under Western Command. In April 1942 the division was sent to defend Kent in South-Eastern Command, under Lieutenant-General Bernard Montgomery, between 1942–1943, joining XII Corps ready to defeat a German invasion (Operation Sea Lion), serving with the 43rd (Wessex) Infantry Division and 46th Infantry Division. The 53rd Division was later earmarked to form part of the Second Army for the invasion of Europe.

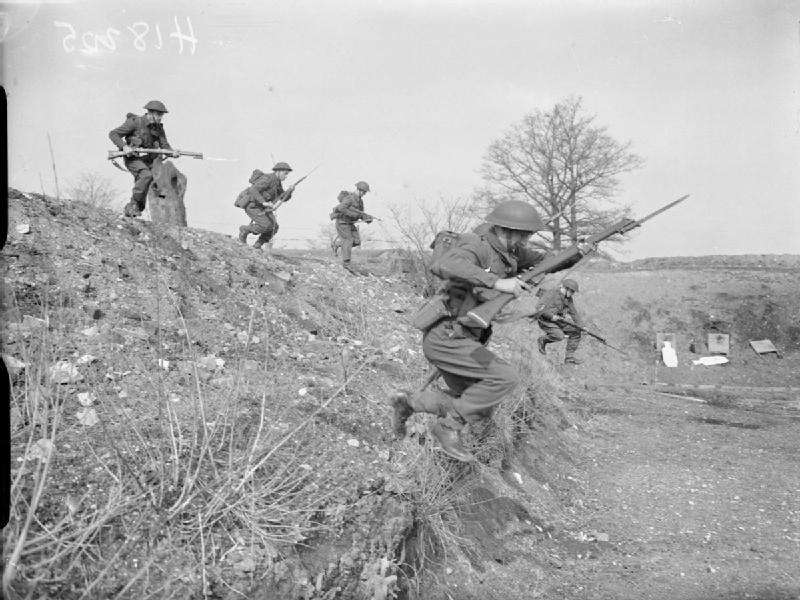
With bayonets fixed, men of the 7th Battalion, Royal Welch Fusiliers charge down a bank on an assault course at Teddesley Hall, Penkridge in Staffordshire, England, 27 March 1942.

In September 1942, the division received a new GOC (General Officer Commanding), Major-General Robert Knox "Bobby" Ross, an officer of the Queen's Royal Regiment (West Surrey) who arrived to replace Major-General Gerard Bucknall. Like most senior British commanders of the Second World War, he was a veteran of the Great War, where he had been awarded the Distinguished Service Order and the Military Cross. Before promotion to command of the 53rd, he had commanded the 160th Infantry Brigade and before that, the 2nd Battalion, Queen's Royal Regiment in Palestine. He commanded the 53rd (Welsh) Division until August 1945, training the division to a very high standard in England and Kent and leading it throughout the campaign in North-west Europe.

On 17 May 1942, the 53rd (Welsh) Division was reorganised, its 159th Infantry Brigade detaching to help form the 11th Armoured Division (The Black Bull), with the 31st Tank Brigade taking its place as part of an experiment with New Model Divisions (or Mixed Divisions) of one tank brigade and two infantry brigades. The experiment was abandoned in late 1943, being judged unsuitable for the terrain in North-western Europe and the 31st Tank Brigade was replaced by the 71st Infantry Brigade (containing the 1st East Lancashire Regiment, 1st Oxfordshire and Buckinghamshire Light Infantry and 1st Highland Light Infantry, nicknamed the Foreign or International Brigade) from the disbanded 42nd Armoured Division, in October.

The division spent the remaining period in the build-up to the Allied invasion of Normandy (Operation Overlord) in training. The intensity of training was stepped up in 1944. Early in the year, 53rd (Welsh) Division was involved in two corps-level exercises. In March, the divisional HQ and the brigade and ancillary HQs took part in 'Exercise Shudder' to study 'thrust line' technique; then, in April, the whole division was engaged in 'Exercise Henry' on the South Downs training area; this included a river crossing and full-scale simulated attack. In May, 'Exercise Bud' practised loading vehicles onto landing craft. Finally, in the last week of May, the division began moving into its concentration area at Herne Bay, ready for the invasion.

=== 1944–1945 ===
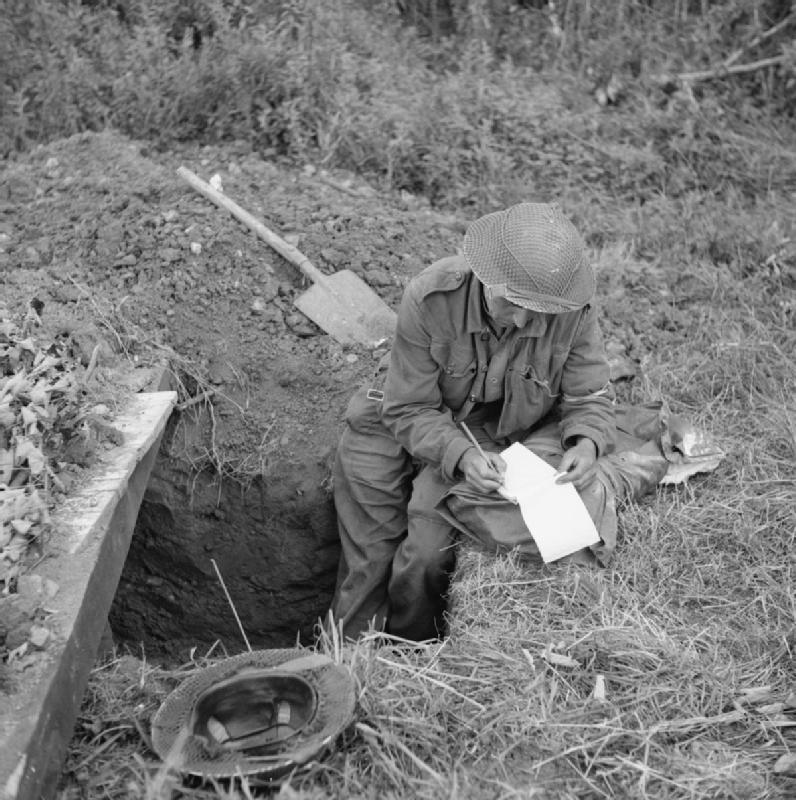
Fusilier W. Nodder of the Royal Welch Fusiliers writes home from his slit trench before the attack on Evrecy, Normandy, France, 16 July 1944.

53rd (Welsh) Division landed in Normandy on 28 June 1944, the second last British infantry division to land and was placed under command of XII Corps, defending the Odon Valley position. The division was involved in much fighting in this area, with the 158th Brigade detached to fight with the 15th (Scottish) Infantry Division in the Second Battle of the Odon (Operation Greenline) before Operation Goodwood in mid-July. In August, it began to push beyond the Odon and crossed the river Orne, helping to close the Falaise Pocket. It was during this fighting that Acting Captain Tasker Watkins, Officer Commanding (OC) B Company of the 1/5th Battalion, Welch Regiment was awarded the Victoria Cross, the first and only to be awarded to the regiment and division during the war, as well as the only Welshman of the British Army during the Second World War to be awarded the VC.

On 2 August, the GOC, Major-General Ross, decided that due to the casualties suffered by the division in Normandy and an acute lack of infantry replacements, the battalions of the 158th Brigade (the 4th, 6th and 7th Battalions of the Royal Welch Fusiliers) were replaced and sent to other brigades of the division, the 4th RWF transferring to 71 Brigade and 6th RWF to 160 Brigade while the 7th RWF remained in 158 Brigade. "It was found that with three Battalions of one Regiment in the same Brigade – as in the case of the 158th Brigade with its three Battalions of Royal Welch Fusiliers – difficulties were experienced in providing reinforcements in the event of heavy casualties. This was particularly so with Officer reinforcements." (Curiously though, this did occur with the 131st (Queen's) Brigade of the 7th Armoured Division). By 31 August 1944, the 53rd (Welsh) Division had suffered many casualties; in just over two months of fighting, 52 officers and 533 other ranks were killed, 145 officers were wounded, 18 missing, 2,711 other ranks wounded and 360 missing for a total of 3,819 casualties. The division had managed to capture over 3,800 prisoners of war (POWs).

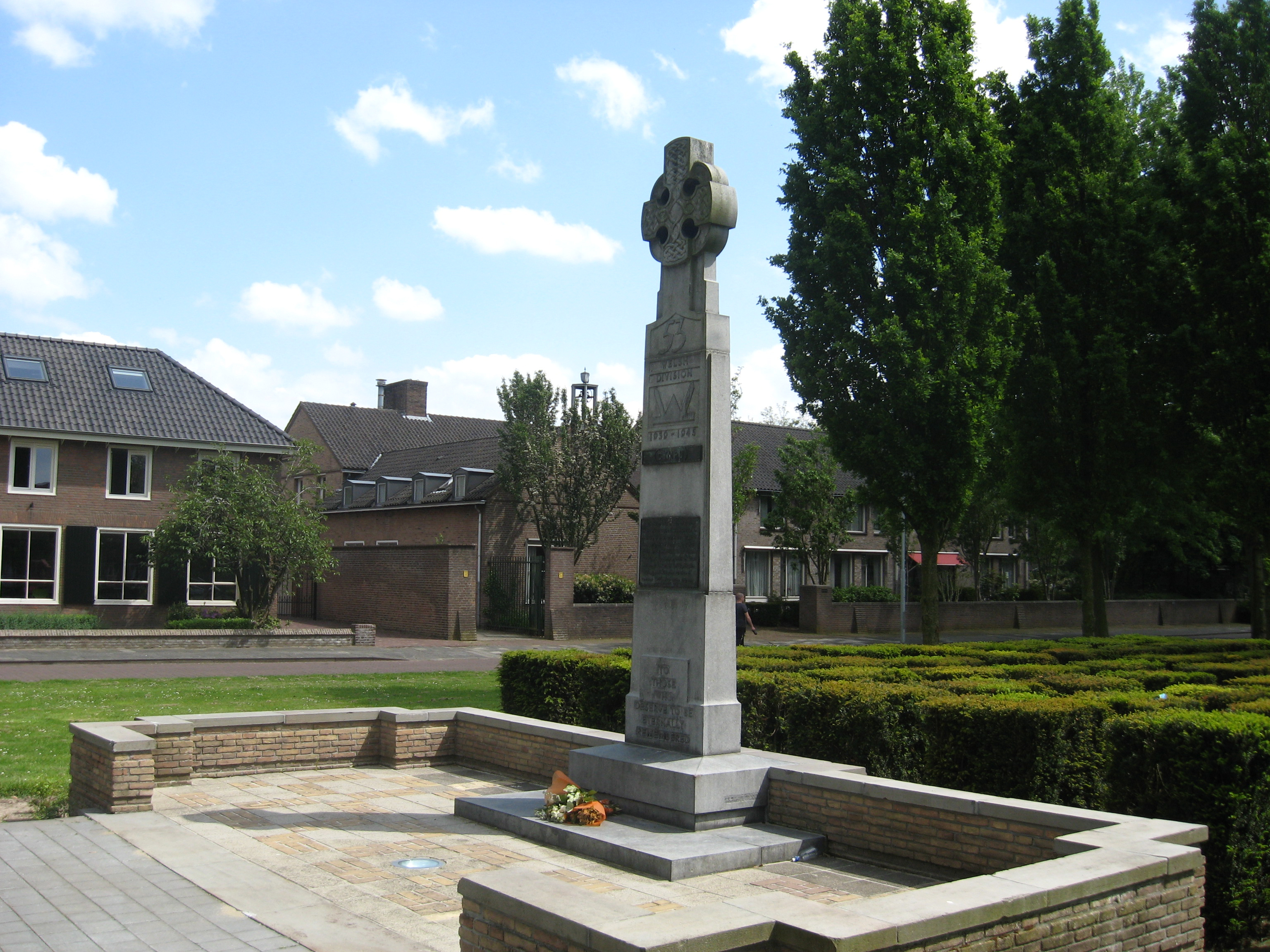
Memorial to the 53rd (Welsh) Division, 's-Hertogenbosch.

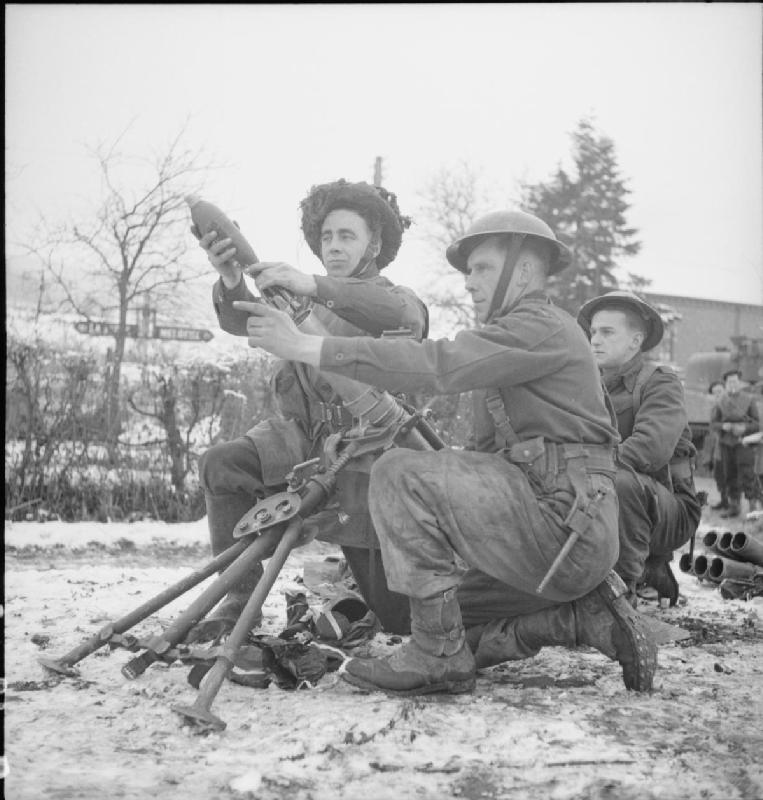
3-inch mortar team of the 2nd Battalion, Monmouthshire Regiment in action during the advance of 53rd (Welsh) Division towards Laroche in Belgium, 5 January 1945.

The division took part in the Swan (swift advance) to Belgium where much fighting took place to secure an important bridgehead at the Junction Canal near Lommel. The 53rd Division then fought hard to expand the salient south of Eindhoven in conjunction with the Operation Market Garden, which ended in failure due to events at the Battle of Arnhem in late September, where the British 1st Airborne Division was virtually destroyed in severe fighting. Advancing into the Netherlands, 53rd (Welsh) Division liberated the city of 's-Hertogenbosch in four days of heavy fighting from 24 October.

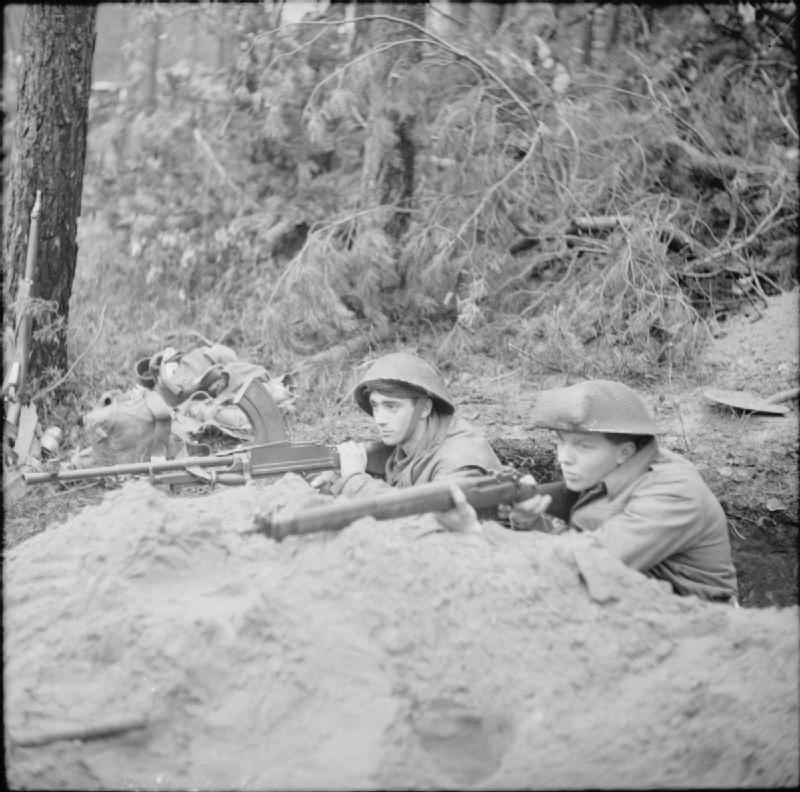
Two men of the 6th Battalion, Royal Welch Fusiliers man a trench in the Reichswald Forest, Germany, 8 February 1945.

In December 1944, attached to XXX Corps, it was one of the British divisions that took part in the mainly American Battle of the Bulge, helping to cut off the northern tip of the German salient. For the next few weeks, the division absorbed large numbers of replacements and trained the newcomers. Still with XXX Corps, which was attached to the First Canadian Army, it was later sent north in front of the Siegfried Line to take part in Operation Veritable (the Battle of the Reichswald Forest) in February 1945 where the division, supported by Churchill tanks of the 34th Armoured Brigade, was involved in some of the fiercest fighting of the campaign thus far, against determined German paratroopers and fighting in terrain similar to that found at Passchendaele 27 years before but with the addition of the cold of "winter rain, mud and flooding", where the mud was knee-deep. The Commanding Officer (CO) of the 1st Battalion, East Lancashire Regiment described the fighting in the forest as a "terribly wearing business for the men. Psychologically and mentally. It was nearly all bayonet, Sten and grenade fighting. The Bosch reserves fought very well, stubborn and had to be dug out with the bayonet." Throughout Veritable the 53rd Division suffered almost 2,500 casualties (including psychiatric casualties), roughly a quarter of what they suffered throughout the entire campaign, while capturing over 3,000 prisoners.

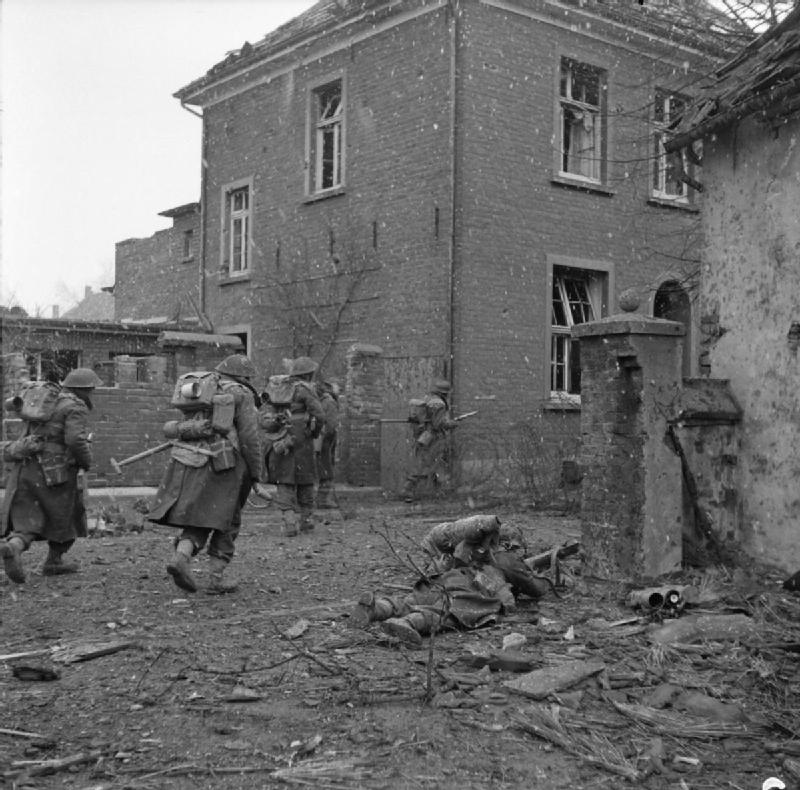
Men of the 4th Battalion, Welch Regiment in Weeze, Germany, 3 March 1945.

The division, now under command of XII Corps, under Lieutenant-General Neil Ritchie, took part in Operation Plunder, the crossing of the Rhine, and advancing into Germany, where they ended the war. Throughout its 10 months of almost continuous combat, the 53rd (Welsh) Division had suffered nearly 10,000 casualties: 113 officers and 1,396 other ranks killed, 387 officers and 7,221 other ranks wounded and 33 officers and 1,255 other ranks missing. Of those declared missing, 3 officers and 553 other ranks rejoined their units, bringing the total casualties for the division to 9,849 killed, wounded or missing. As with most divisions, the majority of these casualties were sustained by the average "Tommy" in the infantry–nicknamed the PBI or "Poor Bloody Infantry"–who had sustained more than 80 percent of the total losses. According to Ross the division "captured some 35,000 prisoners of war and probably accounted for the same amount in dead and wounded."

== Post-war ==
The division ended the war in 1945 in Hamburg. It served later as a peacekeeping force in the Rhineland, then disbanded to reform the 2nd Infantry Division in Germany in early 1947. It was reactivated later that year, serving as part of the peacetime TA. In 1961 the division became a district headquarters as 53rd (Welsh) Division/District, and it was disbanded in 1967. The district headquarters itself formed the core of the structure for the creation of Headquarters Wales under HQ UK Land Forces in 1972.

In the early 2000s, there were a few remnants of the division in the TA. The 160th Brigade was the regional brigade responsible for the administration of all TA units in Wales, while 53 (Welsh) Signal Squadron was the descendant formation of 53rd (Welsh) Divisional Signal Regiment, and continues to serve in a very similar capacity, providing communications support to the 160th Brigade.

== Victoria Cross recipients ==
- Captain Tasker Watkins, 1/5th Battalion, Welch Regiment, Second World War
- Refer to Monmouthshire Regiment section for Corporal Thomas Edward Chapman VC

== General officers commanding ==
Appointed	General officer commanding
April 1908 – January 1909	Brigadier-General Augustus Hill
January 1909 – September 1913	Major-General Francis Lloyd
14 October 1913 – 19 August 1915	Major-General John Lindley
19–25 August 1915	Major-General Herbert Lawrence (temporary)
25 August – 9 September 1915	Major-General William Marshall
9–13 September 1915	Brigadier-General W.J.C. Butler (acting)
13 September – 23 December 1915	Major-General William Marshall
23–27 December 1915	Brigadier-General R. O'B Taylor (acting)
27 December 1915 – 11 January 1916	Brigadier-General W.J.C. Butler (acting)
11 January 1916 – 6 March 1916	Major-General Alister Dallas
8–11 March 1916	Brigadier-General A.H. Short (acting)
11 March – 20 May 1916	Major-General Alister Dallas
20 May – 28 June 1916	Brigadier-General A.H. Short (acting)
28 June 1916 – 10 April 1917	Major-General Alister Dallas
10 April 1917 – July 1919	Major-General Stanley F. Mott
July 1919 – 1921	Major-General Cyril Deverell
March 1922 – June 1923	Major-General Archibald Montgomery
June 1923 – June 1927	Major-General Thomas Marden
June 1927 – October 1928	Major-General Thomas Cubitt
October 1928 – June 1930	Major-General Charles Deedes
June 1930 – December 1932	Major-General Charles Grant
December 1932 – June 1935	Major-General James Dick-Cunyngham
June 1935 – June 1939	Major-General Gervase Thorpe
June 1939 – 29 July 1941	Major-General Bevil Wilson
29 July 1941 – 12 September 1942	Major-General Gerard Bucknall
12 September 1942 – 16 February 1945	Major-General Robert Knox Ross
16 February – 10 March 1945	Brigadier M. Elrington (acting)
10 March – 27 May 1945	Major-General Robert Ross
27 May – 3 June 1945	Brigadier Charles Coleman (acting)
3 June – 26 August 1945	Major-General Robert Ross
26 August 1945	Brigadier C.F.C. Coleman (acting)
1945–1946	Major-General Francis Matthews
1946	Major-General George Richards
1946–1947	Major-General Philip Balfour
1 January – August 1947	Major-General Christopher Woolner
August 1947 – March 1950	Major-General George Wood
March 1950 – October 1952	Major-General Ernest Down
October 1952 – March 1955	Major-General Edric Bastyan
March 1955 – January 1958	Major-General William Cox
January 1958 – February 1961	Major-General Lewis Pugh
February 1961 – December 1963	Major-General Richard Frisby
December 1963 – April 1967	Major-General Douglas Darling

== Orders of battle ==
53rd (Welsh) Division (1914–1918)

158th (North Wales) Brigade

- 1/4th (Denbighshire) Battalion, Royal Welch Fusiliers (left on 6 November 1914)
- 1/5th (Flintshire) Battalion, Royal Welsh Fusiliers (until 2 August 1918) (Note: 1/5th and 1/6th Battalions of the Royal Welch Fusiliers were amalgamated on 3 August 1918 as the 5th/6th Battalion, Royal Welch Fusiliers.)
- 1/6th (Carnarvon and Anglesey) Battalion, Royal Welsh Fusiliers (until 2 August 1918)
- 1/7th (Merionethshire & Montgomeryshire) Battalion, Royal Welsh Fusiliers (to 160th Bde 24 June 1918)
- 1/1st Battalion, Herefordshire Regiment (joined on 24 April 1915, left 1 June 1918)
- 5th/6th Battalion, Royal Welch Fusiliers (from 3 August 1918)
- 158th Machine Gun Company, Machine Gun Corps (formed 26 April 1916, moved to 53rd Battalion, Machine Gun Corps 25 April 1918)
- 158th Trench Mortar Battery (formed 22 July 1917)
- 4th Battalion, 11th Gurkha Rifles (newly formed on 25 April 1918 and joined on 4 June 1918)
- 3rd Battalion, 153rd Rifles (newly formed on 25 April 1918 and joined on 10 June 1918)
- 3rd Battalion, 154th Infantry (joined from Mesopotamia on 3 August 1918)

159th (Cheshire) Brigade

- 1/4th Battalion, Cheshire Regiment (left 31 May 1918)
- 1/5th Battalion, Cheshire Regiment (left November 1914)
- 1/6th Battalion, Cheshire Regiment (left November 1914)
- 1/7th Battalion, Cheshire Regiment (left 1 June 1918)
- 2/6th Battalion, Cheshire Regiment (from November 1914 to April 1915)
- 2/5th Battalion, Cheshire Regiment (from February 1915 to April 1915)
- 1/4th Battalion, Welsh Regiment (from 17 April 1915)
- 1/5th Battalion, Welsh Regiment (from 17 April 1915, between 8 October 1915 and 20 February 1916 merged with 1/4th Battalion, fully amalgamated 30 July 1918)
- 159th Machine Gun Company, Machine Gun Corps (formed 20 April 1916, moved to 53rd Battalion, Machine Gun Corps 25 April 1918)
- 159th Trench Mortar Battery (formed 28 June 1917)
- 3rd Battalion, 152nd Punjabis (from 4 June 1918)
- 2nd Battalion, 153rd Punjabis (from 5 June 1918)
- 1st Battalion, 153rd Punjabis (from 2 August 1918)

160th (Welsh Border) Brigade

- 1/1st Battalion, Monmouthshire Regiment (left February 1915)
- 1/2nd Battalion, Monmouthshire Regiment (left November 1914)
- 1/3rd Battalion, Monmouthshire Regiment (left February 1915)
- 1/1st Battalion, Herefordshire Regiment (to 24 April 1915)
- 2/4th Battalion, Queen's (Royal West Surrey Regiment) (from 24 April 1915, left 31 May 1918)
- 1/4th Battalion, Royal Sussex Regiment (from 24 April 1915, left 30 May 1918)
- 2/4th Battalion, Queen's Own (Royal West Kent Regiment) (from 24 April 1915, left 25 August 1918)
- 2/10th Battalion, Duke of Cambridge's Own (Middlesex Regiment) (from 24 April 1915, left 19 August 1918)
- 1/7th (Merionethshire & Montgomeryshire) Battalion, Royal Welsh Fusiliers (from 158th Bde on 24 June 1918) Brigade)
- 160th Machine Gun Company, Machine Gun Corps (formed 11 May 1916, moved to 53rd Battalion, Machine Gun Corps 25 April 1918)
- 160th Trench Mortar Battery (formed 26 June 1917)
- 21st Punjabis (from 26 May 1918)
- 110th Mahratta Light Infantry (joined from Karachi on 28 June 1918, left 19 July)
- 1st Battalion, Cape Corps (South African, joined 22 July 1918)
- 17th Infantry (The Loyal Regiment) (from 6 August 1918)

2nd South Western Mounted Brigade (attached 29 November–9 December 1915)

- 1/1st Royal 1st Devon Yeomanry
- 1/1st Royal North Devon Yeomanry
- 1/1st West Somerset Yeomanry
- 2nd South Western Mounted Brigade Signal Section, Royal Engineers
- 2nd South Western Mounted Brigade Field Ambulance, Royal Army Medical Corps

2/1st London Brigade (attached January–April 1916)

- 2/1st (City of London) Battalion, London Regiment
- 2/2nd (City of London) Battalion, London Regiment
- 2/3rd (City of London) Battalion, London Regiment
- 2/4th (City of London) Battalion, London Regiment

4th Dismounted Brigade (attached 15 March–21 June 1916)

- 1/1st Pembroke Yeomanry
- 1/1st Montgomeryshire Yeomanry
- 1/1st Glamorgan Yeomanry
- 1/1st Shropshire Yeomanry
- 1/1st Cheshire Yeomanry
- 1/1st Denbighshire Hussars

Divisional Mounted Troops

- Westmorland and Cumberland Yeomanry (joined 18 August 1914; remained in England when the division embarked for Gallipoli)
- South Irish Horse (one squadron attached 22 June–19 July 1915)
- A Squadron, Duke of Lancaster's Own Yeomanry (joined 1 February 1916; left 23 August 1917)
- A Squadron, 1/1st Lincolnshire Yeomanry (attached 19 December 1916 – 14 January 1917)
- A Squadron, 2nd County of London Yeomanry (Westminster Dragoons) (attached 12–28 January 1917)
- 53rd (Welsh) Divisional Cyclist Company (raised after outbreak of war)

53rd (Welsh) Divisional Artillery

53rd (Welsh) Divisional Artillery (Divisional Artillery remained in England when the division embarked for Gallipoli. It embarked for France in November 1915 and joined the British Expeditionary Force on the Western Front, until February 1916 when it re-embarked and joined the rest of the division in Egypt.)

- Royal Field Artillery
  - I Welsh (Howitzer) Brigade (renamed CCLXV (265) Bde and batteries became A & B 26 May 1916; renumbered CCLXI (261) Bde 15 September 1916)
    - 1st Glamorgan (H) Battery (became C (H) Bty in CCLXV Bde 25 December 1916)
    - 2nd Glamorgan (H) Battery (became C (H) Bty in CCLXVI Bde 25 December 1916)
    - I Welsh (H) Brigade Ammunition Column (joined 53rd Divisional Ammunition Column 23–27 November 1916)
  - II Welsh Brigade (renamed CCLXVI (266) Bde and batteries became A & B 26 May 1916; renumbered CCLXVII (267) Bde 25 December 1916)
    - 3rd Glamorgan Battery (broken up between B and C Btys 25 December 1916)
    - 4th Glamorgan Battery (B Bty; renamed A Bty 25 December 1916)'
    - Cardigan Battery (C Bty; renamed B Bty 25 December 1916)
    - 437 (H) Bty (formed 8 April 1918 with equipment from C (H)/CXVII Bty (74th (Yeomanry) Division), personnel from 53rd and 60th (2/2nd London) Divisional Ammunition Columns and 9th Mountain Bty RGA)
    - II Welsh Brigade Ammunition Column (joined 53rd Divisional Ammunition Column 23–27 November 1916)
  - Cheshire Brigade (renamed CCLXVII (267) Bde and batteries became A–C 26 May 1916; renumbered CCLXV (265) Bde 25 December 1916)
    - 1st Cheshire Battery (broken up between B and C Btys 25 December 1916)
    - 2nd Cheshire Battery (B Bty; renamed A Bty 25 December 1916)
    - 3rd Cheshire Battery (C Bty; renamed B Bty 25 December 1916)
    - C (H) Bty (joined from old CCLXV (I Welsh) Bde 5 December 1916)
    - Cheshire Brigade Ammunition Column (joined 53rd Divisional Ammunition Column 23–27 November 1916)
  - IV Welsh Brigade (renamed CCLXVIII (268) Bde and batteries became A–C 26 May 1916; renumbered CCLXVI (266) Bde 25 December 1916)
    - 1st Monmouth Battery (A Bty)
    - 2nd Monmouth Battery (B Bty)
    - 3rd Monmouth Battery (broken up between A and B Btys 25 December 1916)
    - C (H) Bty (joined from old CCLXV (I Welsh) Bde 5 December 1916)
    - IV Welsh Brigade Ammunition Column (joined 53rd Divisional Ammunition Column 23–27 November 1916)
  - 53rd (Welsh) Divisional Ammunition Column, RFA (only Small Arms Ammunition Section went to Gallipoli, remainder joined 54th (East Anglian) Division in France; reformed in Egypt from BACs 23–27 November 1916
- Heavy Artillery
  - Welsh (Carnarvonshire) Heavy Battery and Ammunition Column, Royal Garrison Artillery (remained in England when division embarked for Gallipoli)

Royal Engineers

- 1/1st Welsh Field Company (numbered 436 Field Company 4 February 1917)
- 2/1st Welsh Field Company (raised after outbreak of war and joined 2 December 1915; numbered 437 Field Company 4 February 1917)
- 1/1st Cheshire Field Company (embarked for France 8 December 1914 and joined 3rd Division)
- 2/1st Cheshire Field Company (raised after outbreak of war and joined in England; numbered 439 Field Company 4 February 1917; to 74th (Yeomanry) Division 9 April 1918)
- 72nd Company, 3rd Bombay Sappers and Miners (joined 5 August 1918)
- 53rd (Welsh) Divisional Signal Company
  - Headquarters and No 1 Section (attached to 54th (East Anglian) Division 10–23 August 1915; to Salonika 15 December 1915; rejoined 22 January 1916)'
  - No 2 (Cheshire) Section
  - No 3 (North Wales) Section
  - No 4 (Welsh Border) Section

Pioneers

- 1st Battalion, 155th Pioneers (from 12 August 1918)

Machine Gun Units

- No 53 Battalion, Machine Gun Corps (formed 15–25 April 1918)
  - 158th MG Company (from 158th Brigade)
  - 159th MG Company (from 159th Brigade)
  - 160th MG Company (from 160th Brigade)
  - Cape Corps MG Company (joined 17 September 1918)

Royal Army Medical Corps

- 1st Welsh Field Ambulance (to Desert Mounted Corps 21 August 1918)
- 2nd Welsh Field Ambulance (absorbed into 170 Combined Field Ambulance 11 September 1918)
- 3rd Welsh Field Ambulance (attached to 54th (East Anglian) Division 11–18 August 1915; absorbed into 171 Combined Field Ambulance 11 September 1918)
- 170 Combined Field Ambulance (joined 3 July 1918)
- 171 Combined Field Ambulance (joined 23 August 1918)
- Welsh Clearing Hospital

Army Service Corps

- Welsh Divisional Transport and Supply Column (remained in England and joined 11th (Northern) Division)
  - Welsh Divisional Company (HQ) (became 479 Company)
  - Cheshire Brigade Company (became 480 Company)
  - North Wales Brigade Company (became 481 Company)
  - Welsh Border Brigade Company (became 482 Company)
  - Welsh Border Mounted Brigade Company (independent of division by 1914)
  - South Wales Mounted Brigade Company (independent of division by 1914)
- 29th Divisional Train (originally 43rd (Wessex) Divisional Train; joined and retitled 53rd (Welsh) Divisional Train 17 March 1916)
  - 246, 247, 248, 249 (Horse Transport) Companies

Army Veterinary Corps

- 53rd (Welsh) Mobile Veterinary Section (raised after outbreak of war, remained in England when division embarked for Gallipoli; rejoined 11 April 1916)

53rd (Welsh) Infantry Division (1939–1945)

158th Infantry Brigade

- 4th (Denbighshire) Battalion, Royal Welch Fusiliers (to 71st Bde 3 August 1944)
- 6th (Caernarvonshire and Anglesey) Battalion, Royal Welch Fusiliers (to 160th Bde 3 August 1944)
- 7th (Merionethshire and Montgomeryshire) Battalion, Royal Welch Fusiliers (left 27 April 1945, rejoined 14 June 1945)
- 158th Infantry Brigade Anti-Tank Company (formed 3 July 1940, joined 53rd Battalion, Reconnaissance Corps, 16 February 1941)
- 1/5th Battalion, Welch Regiment (from 4 August 1944)
- 1st Battalion, East Lancashire Regiment (from 4 August 1944)
- 2nd Battalion, South Wales Borderers (from 26 April 1945)

159th Infantry Brigade (left 17 May 1942)

- 4th Battalion, King's Shropshire Light Infantry
- 3rd Battalion, Monmouthshire Regiment
- 1st Battalion, Herefordshire Regiment
- 159th Infantry Brigade Anti-Tank Company (formed 29 June 1940, joined 53rd Battalion, Reconnaissance Corps, 15 February 1941)

160th Infantry Brigade

- 4th Battalion, Welch Regiment
- 1/5th Battalion, Welch Regiment (left 3 August 1944)
- 2nd Battalion, Monmouthshire Regiment
- 160th Infantry Brigade Anti-Tank Company (formed 1 July 1940, joined 53rd Battalion, Reconnaissance Corps, 15 February 1941)
- 6th Battalion, Royal Welch Fusiliers (from 158th Bde 4 August 1944)

31st Tank Brigade (from 17 May 1942, left 10 September 1943)

- 9th Royal Tank Regiment
- 10th Royal Tank Regiment
- 141st Regiment Royal Armoured Corps

71st Infantry Brigade (from 18 October 1943)

- 1st Battalion, East Lancashire Regiment (left 3 August 1944)
- 1st Battalion, Oxfordshire and Buckinghamshire Light Infantry
- 1st Battalion, Highland Light Infantry (left 17 August 1945)
- 4th Battalion, Royal Welch Fusiliers (from 158th Bde 4 August 1944)
- 1st Battalion, Royal Norfolk Regiment (from 17 August 1945)

Divisional Troops

- 53rd Divisional artillery, Royal Artillery
  - 81st (Welsh) Field Regiment
  - 83rd Field Regiment
  - 133rd Field Regiment
  - 71st (Royal Welch Fusiliers) Anti-Tank Regiment (from 31 October 1940, left 11 April 1941, rejoined 20 June 1941)
  - 63rd (Queen's Own Oxfordshire Hussars) Anti-Tank Regiment (from 12 April, left 20 June 1941)
  - 116th Light Anti-Aircraft Regiment (from 3 April 1942, disbanded 2 December 1944)
  - 25th Light Anti-Aircraft Regiment (from 1 December 1944)
- 53rd Divisional engineers, Royal Engineers
  - 244th (Welsh) Field Company
  - 245th (Welsh) Field Company (left 8 October 1939)
  - 282nd Field Company
  - 555th Field Company (from 30 December 1939)
  - 285th Field Park Company
  - 22nd Bridging Platoon (from 1 October 1943)
  - 53rd (Welsh) Division Postal Unit, Royal Engineers
- 53rd (Welsh) Divisional Signals Regiment, Royal Corps of Signals
- Shropshire Yeomanry (Divisional Cavalry Regiment, left February 1940)
- 5th Battalion, Cheshire Regiment (joined as Machine Gun Battalion, from 11 November 1941, left 1 October 1942)
- 1st Battalion, Manchester Regiment (joined as Support Battalion from 1 October 1943, became Machine Gun Battalion from 27 February 1944)
- 53rd Battalion, Reconnaissance Corps (formed 1 January 1941, became 53rd Regiment, Recce Corps, 6 June 1942, became 53rd (Welsh) Recce Regiment, Royal Armoured Corps, 1 January 1944)

== See also ==
- List of British divisions in World War I
- List of British divisions in World War II
- British Army Order of Battle (September 1939)
- Independent Company

== Bibliography ==
- Barclay, C. N. (1956). The History of the 53rd (Welsh) Division in the Second World War. London: Wm. Clowes & Sons. OCLC 36762829.
- Becke, Archibald F. (1936). Order of Battle of Divisions Part 2A. The Territorial Force Mounted Divisions and the 1st-Line Territorial Force Divisions (42–56). London: HMSO. OCLC 4405016.
- Delaforce, P. (2015) [1996]. Red Crown & Dragon: 53rd Welsh Division in North-West Europe 1944–1945 (Thistle ed.). Brighton: Tom Donovan. ISBN 978-1-91019-863-6.
- Falls, Cyril; G. MacMunn (1930). Military Operations Egypt & Palestine from the Outbreak of War with Germany to June 1917. Official History of the Great War Based on Official Documents by Direction of the Historical Section of the Committee of Imperial Defence. Vol. 1. London: HM Stationery Office. OCLC 610273484.
- James, Brigadier E. A. (1978). British Regiments 1914–18. London: Samson Books Limited. ISBN 0-906304-03-2.
- Joslen, H. F. (2003) [1960]. Orders of Battle: Second World War, 1939–1945. Uckfield, East Sussex: Naval and Military Press. ISBN 978-1-84342-474-1.
- Westlake, Ray (1996). British Regiments at Gallipoli. Barnsley: Leo Cooper. ISBN 0-85052-511-X.
- Roberts, John H. (September 2000). Welsh Bridges to the Elbe. Oxford: Boldacre Books. ISBN 1-898893-00-4.
- Sir John Smyth, Bolo Whistler: The Life of General Sir Lashmer Whistler, London: Frederick Muller, 1967.
- Ward, Maj C.H. Dudley, History of the 53rd (Welsh) Division (T.F.) 1914–1918, Cardiff: Western Mail, 1927/Uckfield: Naval & Military, 2004, ISBN 978-1-845740-50-4.
- Watson, Graham E.; Rinaldi, Richard A. (2018). The Corps of Royal Engineers: Organization and Units 1889–2018. Tiger Lily Books. ISBN 978-171790180-4.
- Westlake, Ray (1992). British Territorial Units 1914–18. Men-at-Arms Series. Vol. 245. Osprey. ISBN 978-1-85532-168-7.
- Young, Lt-Col Michael, Army Service Corps 1902–1918, Barnsley: Leo Cooper, 2000, ISBN 0-85052-730-9.
