= Charles Grant (British Army officer) =

British Army general

General Sir Charles Grant KCB KCVO DSO
- Born: 13 August 1877; London, England
- Died: 9 November 1950 (aged 73); Epsom, Surrey, England
- Burial place: Balmacaan, Glen Urquhart, Inverness-shire
- Military career
- Allegiance: United Kingdom
- Branch: British Army
- Service years: 1897–1940
- Rank: General
- Unit: Coldstream Guards
- Commands: Scottish Command; London District; 53rd (Welsh) Division; 8th Infantry Brigade; 137rd (Staffordshire) Brigade; 3rd Battalion, Coldstream Guards
- Conflicts: Second Boer War; First World War; Second World War
- Awards: Knight Commander of the Order of the Bath; Knight Commander of the Royal Victorian Order; Distinguished Service Order; Mentioned in Despatches (7); Legion of Honour (France)

General Sir Charles John Cecil Grant, KCB, KCVO, DSO (13 August 1877 – 9 November 1950) was a senior British Army officer. He saw active service in the Second Boer War in South Africa from 1899 to 1902, in the First World War of 1914 to 1918, and was a general officer during the 1930s and the early stages of the Second World War.

== Military career ==
Grant was commissioned a second lieutenant in the Coldstream Guards on 20 February 1897, and promoted to lieutenant on 11 May 1898. He served in the Second Boer War in South Africa from 1899 to 1902, where he was part of the Kimberley relief force, and was wounded at the Battle of Belmont in November 1899. Following the end of the war, he was appointed adjutant of the 1st Battalion of his regiment on 1 July 1902.

Grant left his position of brigade major of the 3rd Infantry Brigade, 1st Division, to which he had been appointed in 1909, in order to become a general staff officer, grade 3 (GSO3), at the War Office in February 1912. He was promoted to major in October 1913.

Grant also served in the First World War, initially as a brigade major for the 3rd Infantry Brigade which formed part of the British Expeditionary Force deployed to France in August 1914. In December 1915 he succeeded Brigadier General Charles Sackville-West as general staff officer, grade 1 (GSO1), or chief of staff, of the 12th (Eastern) Division, for which he was promoted to the temporary rank of lieutenant colonel while holding the appointment. He then became temporary general officer commanding (GOC) of the 1st Infantry Brigade in 1917. In 1918 he was assigned to General Headquarters of the French Army, as a liaison officer between General Sir Henry Wilson, Chief of the Imperial General Staff, and French Marshal Ferdinand Foch. He was awarded the Distinguished Service Order, mentioned in dispatches seven times, and was wounded during the war.

Grant became commanding officer of the 3rd Battalion, Coldstream Guards, in 1919 moving on to join the General Staff in Egypt in 1921. In 1925 he became commander of the 137th (Staffordshire) Brigade and, in 1927, commander of the 8th Infantry Brigade.

Grant, having been placed on half-pay in February 1930, then became GOC of the 53rd (Welsh) Division of the Territorial Army (TA). In December 1932 he became Major-General commanding the Brigade of Guards and GOC London District. In 1937 he was appointed General Officer Commanding in Chief of Scottish Command and Governor of Edinburgh Castle, retiring from that posting in 1940. He was also colonel of the King's Shropshire Light Infantry, taking over from Major General Raymond Reade, from February 1931 to 1946.

Grant owned and lived much of his life at Pitchford Hall in Shropshire. He served as a deputy lieutenant for the county in 1946.

== Family ==
Grant was married in 1903 to Lady Sybil Myra Caroline Primrose (1879–1955), eldest daughter of Archibald Primrose, 5th Earl of Rosebery, who had served as British prime minister from 1894 to 1895. They had one son, Charles Robert Archibald Grant (1903–1972), who married Pamela Wellesley (1912–1987), a granddaughter of the 4th Duke of Wellington.

== Later life ==
Grant died at his wife's property, The Durdans, Epsom, Surrey, aged 73, in November 1950, and was buried in the family grave at Balmacaan, Glen Urquhart, Inverness-shire, Scotland.

== Bibliography ==
- Smart, Nick (2005). Biographical Dictionary of British Generals of the Second World War. Barnesley: Pen & Sword. ISBN 1844150496.

Military offices
Preceded by Charles Deedes	GOC 53rd (Welsh) Infantry Division; 1930–1932	Succeeded by James Dick-Cunyngham
Honorary titles
Preceded by Raymond Reade	Colonel of the King's Shropshire Light Infantry; 1931–1947	Succeeded by John Grover
Military offices
Preceded by Albemarle Cator	GOC London District; 1932–1934	Succeeded by Sir Bertram Sergison-Brooke
Preceded by Sir Archibald Cameron	GOC-in-C Scottish Command; 1937–1940	Succeeded by Sir Harold Carrington
