= Stanley Mott =

Major-General Stanley Mott CB
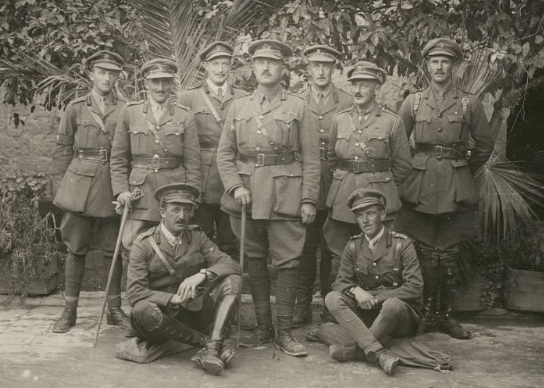
- Stanley Mott and members of his staff in January 1919
- Born: 1873
- Died: 1959 (aged 85–86)
- Military career
- Allegiance: United Kingdom
- Branch: British Army
- Rank: Major-General
- Commands: 158th Infantry Brigade; 53rd (Welsh) Infantry Division
- Conflicts: First World War
- Awards: Companion of the Order of the Bath

Major-General Stanley Fielder Mott CB (1873–1959) was a British Army officer.

== Military career ==
Educated at Eton College, Mott was commissioned into the King's Royal Rifle Corps on 27 September 1893.

He was promoted to brevet major in October 1902 and to supernumerary captain in June 1903.

He was promoted to major in October 1910 and was appointed as a brigade major later in the month but retired from the army less than a year later, in August 1911.

After being granted the temporary rank of lieutenant colonel while serving as an assistant adjutant and quartermaster general, from June to August 1915, he became commander of the 158th Infantry Brigade at Gallipoli in August during the First World War and for which he was promoted to the temporary rank of brigadier general the next month. After being evacuated from Gallipoli, he was promoted to temporary major general and was appointed as general officer commanding (GOC) of the 53rd (Welsh) Division in Egypt in April 1917. He commanded his division at the Third Battle of Gaza in November 1917 and later saw action at the Battle of Romani in August 1916, the Battle of Buqqar Ridge in October 1917 and the Battle of Tell 'Asur in March 1918.

He was promoted to honorary major general in June 1919 and retired from the army in July 1919.

Military offices
Preceded by Alister Dallas	GOC 53rd (Welsh) Infantry Division; 1916–1917	Succeeded by Cyril Deverell
