= General Carrington =

General Carrington may refer to:

- Frederick Carrington (1844–1913), British Army major general
- Harold Carrington (1882–1964), British Army lieutenant general
- Henry B. Carrington (1824–1912), Union Army brigadier general
