= Arthur Green (British Army officer) =

Brigadier-General Arthur Green CMG DSO
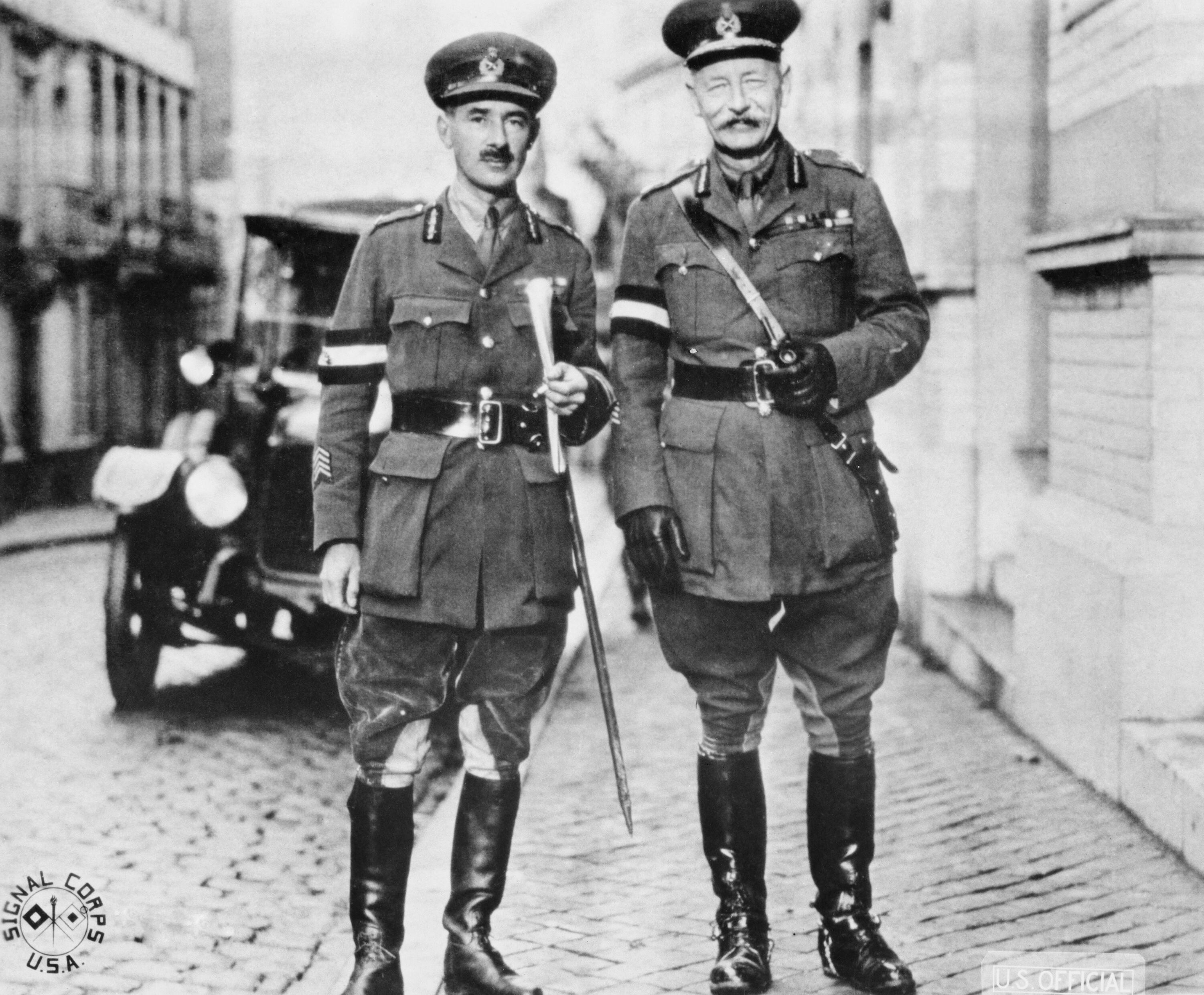
- Green (left) with General Haking in 1918 at Spa
- Born: 20 August 1878
- Died: 20 April 1964 (aged 85)
- Military career
- Allegiance: United Kingdom
- Branch: British Army
- Rank: Brigadier-General
- Commands: 4th Battalion, Sussex Home Guard
- Conflicts: Anglo-Boer War; World War I World War II
- Awards: Distinguished Service Order

Brigadier-General Arthur Frank Umfreville Green CMG DSO (20 August 1878 – 20 April 1964) was a senior British Army officer in World War I and author of several publications.

== Military career ==
Green was commissioned as a second lieutenant in the Royal Garrison Artillery on 23 December 1897, and in March 1900 was seconded for service in South Africa during the Second Boer War, leaving Southampton on the SS Umbria late that month.

During World War I he was deployed in Flanders and in Italy. He served as a quartermaster general with the XI Corps and was part of the Inter-Allied Commission at the Spa Conference of 1920. He was promoted on 3 June 1918 to brevet colonel "for distinguished service in connection with Military Operations in Italy".

From 1920 to 1924 he was commanded to Malta. In World War II he commanded the 4th battalion of the Sussex Home Guard.

== Works ==
- As Down Of Thistle (1904) under the Pen name Arthur Wenlock.
- The Countermine (1905) under the Pen name Arthur Wenlock.
- Landscape sketching for military purposes, London, Hugh Rees, 1908.
- Evening Tattoo, 1940.
- The British Home Guard Pocket-Book, 1940.
- Questions Answered about Rifle Shooting, 1945.
