= Alister Dallas =

British Army general

Major-General Alister Dallas CB CMG
- Born: 10 June 1866; Kensington, London, England
- Died: 2 February 1931 (aged 64); Hambledon, Hampshire, England
- Military career
- Allegiance: United Kingdom
- Branch: British Army
- Rank: Major-General
- Commands: 32nd Infantry Brigade; 53rd (Welsh) Division
- Conflicts: Second Boer War; First World War
- Awards: Companion of the Order of the Bath; Companion of the Order of St Michael and St George; Order of the White Eagle, 2nd Class (Serbia)

Major-General Alister Grant Dallas, CB, CMG (10 June 1866 – 2 February 1931) was a British Army officer.

== Early military career ==
Born the son of Alexander Grant Dallas, JP, DL and Mabel Alice Brooke, Dallas was commissioned into the 16th The Queen's Lancers as a lieutenant on 23 August 1886.

He was promoted to captain on 7 March 1892, and in 1897 served in the campaign in the North West Frontier of India, first as orderly officer to Major-General Penn Symons, commanding 2nd brigade, Tochi Field Force, and then followed Symons as aide-de-camp when he commanded the 1st division in the Tirah campaign. During the latter, he was present at the capture of the Sampagha and Arhanga passes (October 1897), the reconnaissance of the Saran Sar, operations in the Waran an Mastura Valleys and forcing of the Sapri pass (November 1897). For his service in this expedition he was mentioned in despatches and received the India Medal with two clasps.

== Second Boer War ==
After the outbreak of the Second Boer War in October 1899, Dallas was the following month seconded for special service in South Africa. He was wounded early the following year, and invalided home on board the SS Orotava in April 1900. He was back as a regular captain in his regiment in October 1901, and was promoted to major the next month.

== Post-war years ==
Dallas transferred to the Durham Light Infantry (DLI) in October 1902, and served from January 1905 onwards as a deputy assistant adjutant-general (DAAG) at the War Office, in succession to Colonel William Henry Birkbeck. He then became commandant of the School of Musketry in South Africa in 1907. He was promoted to lieutenant colonel in June 1907. Towards the end of his assignment as commandant, he was promoted to colonel in July 1911. He relinquished this appointment later that month and was then placed on half-pay. In October, after coming off of half-pay, he succeeded Colonel Count Gleichen as a general staff officer, grade 1 (GSO1) at the War Office in London.

== First World War ==
In October 1914, a few weeks after the start of the First World War, Dallas became GSO1 (essentially chief of staff in most modern armies) to Lieutenant General Sir Henry Rawlinson, who had recently been assigned as general officer commanding of the newly formed IV Corps of the British Expeditionary Force (BEF) on the Western Front. Promoted in January 1915 to temporary brigadier general, and made a brigadier general, general staff of the corps, now the senior officer on the staff, he was appointed a Companion of the Order of the Bath the following month. In his new role he helped in the planning for the major engagements in which IV Corps found itself involved in that year, most notably the Battle of Neuve Chapelle in March and the Battle of Aubers Ridge in May.

Rawlinson made staff changes in August and Dallas, promoted once again to temporary brigadier general (having since reverted to his permanent rank of colonel) in September, became commander of the 11th (Northern) Division's 32nd Infantry Brigade, which he led in the final stages of the Gallipoli campaign.

After being evacuated from Gallipoli Peninsula in January 1916, Dallas was promoted to the temporary rank of major general in January 1916 and became GOC of the 53rd (Welsh) Division, a Territorial Force formation, at the time serving in Egypt after having been recently evacuated from Gallipoli. After having had his major general's rank made substantive in January 1917, he was appointed to the Order of the White Eagle, 2nd Class by the King of Serbia in February.

He saw action with his division at the First and Second Battles of Gaza, in which his division suffered significant losses, in March and April. Aa a result, he handed over command of his division in April.

== Final years ==
He retired from the army in January 1922.

He died in February 1931, at the age of 64.

Military offices
Preceded by William Marshall	GOC 53rd (Welsh) Infantry Division; 1916–1917	Succeeded by Stanley Mott
