= 160th (Welsh) Brigade =

160th (Welsh) Brigade 160th Infantry Brigade & HQ Wales 160th (Welsh) Infantry Brigade 160th (South Wales) Brigade Welsh Border Brigade
- Current shoulder sleeve insignia of the 160th (Welsh) Brigade.
- Active: 1908–1919, 1920–1947; 1947–1967, 1984–present
- Country: United Kingdom
- Branch: British Army
- Type: Regional Brigade
- Size: Brigade
- Part of: Regional Command
- Brigade HQ: The Barracks, Brecon, Wales
- Engagements: First World War: * Gallipoli Campaign * First Battle of Gaza * Battle of Nablus (1918); Second World War: * Battle of Normandy * Battle of Falaise * Battle of the Bulge * Battle of the Reichswald * Western Allied invasion of Germany

Commanders
- Notable commanders: Sir John Dill; Robert Ross; Eric Dorman-Smith; Sir Lashmer Whistler

160th (Welsh) Brigade or Brigâd 160 (Cymru), is a regional brigade of the British Army that has been in existence since 1908, and saw service during both the First and the Second World Wars, as part of the 53rd (Welsh) Infantry Division. It is a regional command responsible for all of Wales. The Brigade is also regionally aligned with the Eastern European and Central Asian regions as part of defence engagement.

== Formation ==
The Welsh Border Brigade was originally raised in 1908, upon creation of the Territorial Force, and was part of the Welsh Division. The brigade was composed of the 1st, 2nd and 3rd Volunteer battalions of the Monmouthshire Regiment along with the 1st Battalion of the Herefordshire Regiment.

== First World War ==
In 1915 the brigade was re-designated the 160th (1/1st South Wales) Brigade and the Welsh Division the 53rd (Welsh) Division. The brigade fought with the division in the First World War, in the Middle Eastern theatre.

The brigade was reconstituted as a result of British troops being sent to the Western Front during the emergency following the German March 1918 Spring Offensive.

=== Order of battle ===
- 1/1st Battalion, Monmouthshire Regiment (to February 1915)
- 1/2nd Battalion, Monmouthshire Regiment (to November 1914)
- 1/3rd Battalion, Monmouthshire Regiment (to February 1915)
- 1/1st Battalion, Herefordshire Regiment (to 24 April 1915)
- 2/4th Battalion, Queen's (Royal West Surrey Regiment) (from 24 April 1915 to 31 May 1918)
- 1/4th Battalion, Royal Sussex Regiment (from 24 April 1915 to 30 May 1918)
- 2/4th Battalion, Queen's Own (Royal West Kent Regiment) (from 24 April 1915 to 25 August 1918)
- 2/10th Battalion, Duke of Cambridge's Own (Middlesex Regiment) (from 24 April 1914 to 19 August 1918)
- 1/7th (Merionethshire & Montgomeryshire) Battalion, Royal Welsh Fusiliers (joined on 24 June 1918 from 158th (North Wales) Brigade)
- 160th Machine Gun Company, Machine Gun Corps (formed 11 May 1916, moved to 53rd Battalion, Machine Gun Corps 25 April 1918)
- 160th Trench Mortar Battery (formed 26 June 1917)
- 21st Punjabis (from 26 May 1918)
- 110th Mahratta Light Infantry (joined from Karachi on 28 June 1918, left for 20th Indian Brigade on 19 July)
- 1st Battalion, Cape Corps (South African, joined 22 July 1918)
- 17th Infantry (The Loyal Regiment) (from 6 August 1918)

== Inter-war period ==
After the war the brigade and division were disbanded as was the Territorial Force. However, both the brigade and division were reformed in 1920 in the Territorial Army. The brigade, now the 160th (South Wales) Infantry Brigade, was again composed of the same four battalions it had before the Great War. However, these were all posted to the 159th (Welsh Border) Infantry Brigade early in the 1920s and were replaced by the 4th, 5th, 6th and 7th Battalions of the Welch Regiment. The 6th and 7th Battalions were amalgamated as the 6th/7th Battalion, Welch Regiment and the 4th Battalion, King's Shropshire Light Infantry joined in the same year.

== Second World War ==
The brigade, now composed of two battalions of the Welch Regiment and one of the Monmouthshire Regiment, together with the rest of the 53rd (Welsh) Division, was mobilised in late August 1939 and soon afterwards Britain declared war on Nazi Germany. In April 1940 160th Brigade was sent to Northern Ireland and, after the British Expeditionary Force (BEF) was evacuated from France, the brigade was mainly involved in anti-invasion duties and exercises training to repel a potential German invasion of Northern Ireland. In late 1941 160th Brigade, and the rest of the 53rd Division, were sent to Southeast England, where they began years of training for Operation Overlord, the planned Allied invasion of Northern France.

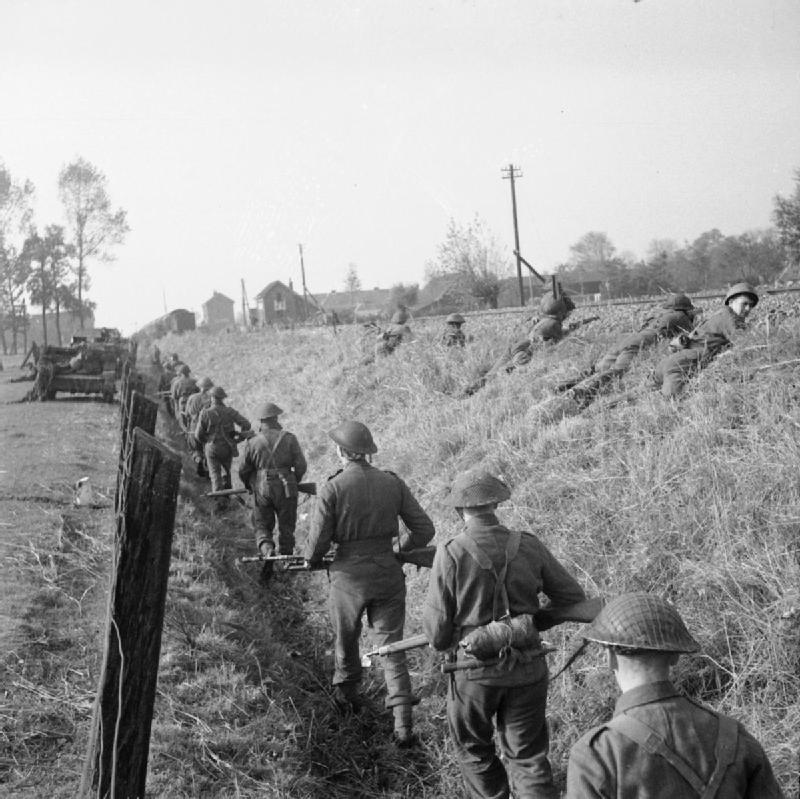
Infantrymen of the 4th Battalion, Welch Regiment advance along a railway embankment during the capture of 's-Hertogenbosch, the Netherlands, 25 October 1944.

On 14 January 1944 Brigadier Lashmer 'Bolo' Whistler was appointed to command 160th Bde. He had just returned to the UK after a successful year commanding the lorried infantry brigade of the famous 7th Armoured Division in North Africa. General Sir Bernard Montgomery regarded Whistler as 'the best and most experienced Brigadier in the British Army' and had earmarked him for a future divisional command. Whistler's appointment to 160th Bde was in line with Montgomery's policy of giving experienced leadership to the inexperienced formations in 'Overlord'. Whistler took over command of 160th Bde on 28 January, and the brigade was immediately involved in two corps-level training exercises. In March the 53rd (W) Division's HQ and all its brigade and ancillary HQs took part in Exercise Shudder to study 'thrust line' technique, then in April the division was engaged in Exercise Henry on the South Downs training area; this included a river crossing and full-scale simulated attack. In May, Exercise Bud practised loading vehicles on to landing craft. Finally, in the last week of May, the brigade began moving into its concentration area at Herne Bay, ready for the invasion.

As a follow-up formation, 53rd (W) Division did not take part in the invasion on D Day (6 June). The 160th Brigade began loading men and equipment aboard its ships on 20 June, but that night Brigadier Whistler was called away to take over 3rd Division whose commander had been wounded in the early fighting in Normandy. Lieutenant-Col Charles Coleman of the 4th Welch, who had been acting-Brigadier before Whistler's arrival, was promoted to take command permanently.

The 160th Brigade landed in Normandy on 28 June and with the rest of the 53rd (W) Division was almost immediately involved in severe attritional fighting around the French city of Caen, facing numerous German panzer divisions, in what came to be known as the Battle for Caen. The brigade later participated in the Second Battle of the Odon, suffering heavy casualties, which resulted in the 1/5th Battalion, Welch Regiment being transferred to the 158th Brigade of the division and replaced by the 6th Battalion, Royal Welch Fusiliers. The decision was made by the divisional commander, Major-General Robert Ross (a former commander of the brigade), due to an acute shortage of infantrymen in the British Army at this stage of the war, even more so in finding sufficient numbers of battle casualty replacements (or reinforcements) for three battalions of the same regiment serving in the same brigade, which, like the 160th Brigade, had also suffered many losses.

The brigade went on to fight in the Battle of Falaise, capturing large numbers of German troops and the subsequent Allied advance from Paris to the Rhine, later playing a minor role in the Battle of the Bulge, a large role in Operation Veritable in February 1945 and crossing the Rhine into Germany over a month later, where it took part in the Western Allied invasion of Germany, finally ending the war in Hamburg, Germany. The 160th Brigade remained in Germany on occupation duties until it was demobilised in late 1946.

=== Order of battle ===
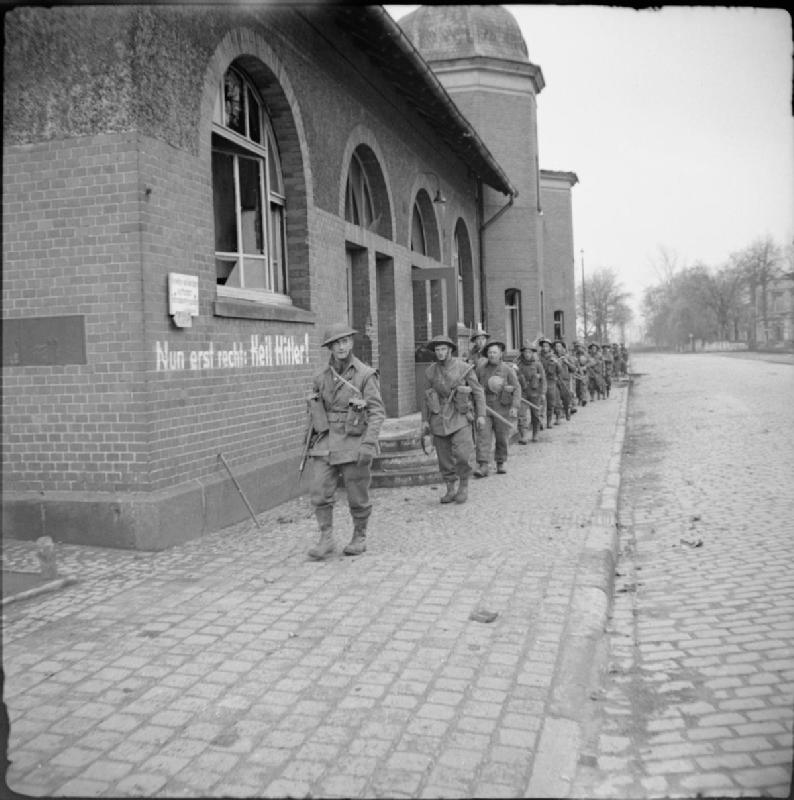
Men of the 2nd Battalion, Monmouthshire Regiment in Bocholt, Germany, 29 March 1945. Note the Nazi slogan painted on the wall.

160th Infantry Brigade was composed as follows during the war:

- 4th Battalion, Welch Regiment
- 1/5th Battalion, Welch Regiment (left 3 August 1944)
- 2nd Battalion, Monmouthshire Regiment
- 160th Infantry Brigade Anti-Tank company (formed 1 July 1940, left 15 February 1941 to join 53rd (Welsh) Reconnaissance Battalion)
- 6th (Caernarvonshire and Anglesey) Battalion, Royal Welch Fusiliers (from 4 August 1944)

=== Commanders ===
The following officers commanded 160th Infantry Brigade during the war:

- Brigadier Aubrey Williams (until 10 May 1940)
- Brigadier Robert Ross (from 10 May 1940 until 17 September 1942)
- Brigadier Eric Dorman-Smith (from 17 September 1942 until 22 November 1943)
- Lieutenant-Colonel Charles Coleman (acting, from 22 November 1943 until 28 January 1944)
- Brigadier Lashmer Whistler (from 28 January 1944 until 22 June 1944)
- Brigadier Charles Coleman (from 22 June 1944 until 27 May 1945)
- Lieutenant-Colonel H.B.D. Crozier (acting, from 27 May 1945 until 3 June 1945)
- Brigadier Charles Coleman (from 3 June 1945)

== Post War ==
Following the reformation of the Territorial Army after the end of the war, the brigade was reformed as the 160th (South Wales) Infantry Brigade on 1 April 1947. The brigade was organised as a 'three-battalion' brigade with the 2nd Battalion, Monmouthshire Regiment in Pontypool, 4th (Carmarthenshire) Battalion, The Welch Regiment in Llanelli, and 5th (Glamorgan) Battalion, The Welch Regiment in Pontypridd under its command. The brigade itself remained under the guise of the 53rd (Welsh) Infantry Division during this time.

Though the TA seemed stable in 1947, it was continually cut and reduced in size time and time again from 1950 onwards. In 1961, the first wave of major cuts came when the old territorial divisions were merged with their local districts to become 'Division/Districts', thus the 53rd (Welsh) Infantry Division became the 53rd (Welsh) Infantry Division/District that year and the brigade became a regional brigade now just tasked with home defence. As a result of the 1966 Defence White Paper, the TA became the 'TAVR' (Territorial & Army Volunteer Reserve) and was organised into four categories: TAVR I: those units tasked with quick-deployment support, ie: SAS and NATO-specific units; TAVR II: Units tasked with NATO-support and/or deployable as normal TA units were; TAVR III: Home defence infantry and light-equipment only units (reduced to cadres in 1969 and disbanded in 1975), and TAVR IV: Sponsored bands, UOTC, and miscellaneous units.

Following the above changes, the old Division/Districts were renamed as 'Districts', with the 53rd (Welsh) Division/District becoming Wales District and now oversaw all units within Wales, with the TA brigades disappearing shortly thereafter. These changes caused little or no direction in doctrine and training from above the battalion level, thus creating a complicated atmosphere.

In 1967, with the Territorial Army reorganised, the brigade's battalions were completely reorganised too. The 2nd Monmouths was disbanded and concurrently reconstituted as two units in TAVR II, B (South Wales Borderers) Company in the Welsh Volunteers based in Newport and in TAVR III, forming the whole unit, the Monmouthshire (Territorial) Battalion, The South Wales Borderers also based in Newport. The 4th Welch was reduced to three companies: in TAVR II, C (Welch) Company in the Welsh Volunteers and in TAVR III, B and C Companies of the 4th (Territorial) Battalion of the Welch Regiment. Finally, the 5th Welch was reduced to two units: in TAVR II, part of C (Welch) Company, and in TAVR III, B Company in Bridgend part of the 5th/6th (Territorial) Battalion, The Welch Regiment. With the wholescale reductions of the TA, the fully territorial brigades and divisions were disbanded and the brigade soon followed suite.

== Cold War ==
In 1984, as a result of the 1981 Defence White Paper, many of the old disbanded territorial brigades were reformed as part of their respective regional districts. These brigades were not like their predecessors however, as with the enhancement of the TA, the brigades became purely administrative headquarters for training. As part of these changes, 160th (Welsh) Infantry Brigade was reformed as the operational formation of Wales District with its headquarters at The Barracks in Brecon. The brigade's task was to protect Wales in its role of a home defence brigade. If mobilised, the brigade would have been the 8th Regional AF Headquarters.

In 1989 the brigade's structure was as follows:

- 160th (Wales) Brigade
  - Brigade Headquarters, at The Barracks, Brecon
  - 1st Battalion, The Royal Regiment of Wales, at Battlesbury Barracks, Warminster (Light Infantry) – infantry demonstration unit at the School of Infantry
  - 3rd (Volunteer) Battalion, The Royal Welch Fusiliers (V), in Wrexham (Light Infantry, Home Defence)
  - 3rd (Volunteer) Battalion, The Royal Regiment of Wales (V), at Maindy Barracks, Cardiff (Light Infantry)
  - 4th (Volunteer) Battalion, The Royal Regiment of Wales (V), in Swansea (Light Infantry, Home Defence)
  - 104th Air Defence Regiment, Royal Artillery (V), at Raglan Barracks, Newport (64 x Blowpipe MANPADS)
  - 157th (Wales and Midlands) Transport Regiment, Royal Corps of Transport (V), at Maindy Barracks, Cardiff
  - 203rd (Welsh) General Hospital, Royal Army Medical Corps (V), in Cardiff (General Hospital)

By the end of the Cold War, the German Army (Bundeswehr) had a battalion-sized tank (panzer) training unit based at the Castlemartin Training Area in West Wales, which was within the brigade's geographical area. The battalion was equipped with the Leopard 1 main battle tank and its personnel rotated through for gunnery and/or manoeuvre training.

After the end of the Cold War, the government published the Options for Change reform which saw several districts either merge or reduce in size, with some having both. Wales District was part of this later group and on 1 April 1992 merged with West Midlands District to form the new Wales and Western District. Following these changes, the brigade was moving under the new district which, in March 1995, was merged with North West District and consequently reduced to 5th Division in 1995.

== Twenty-first century ==
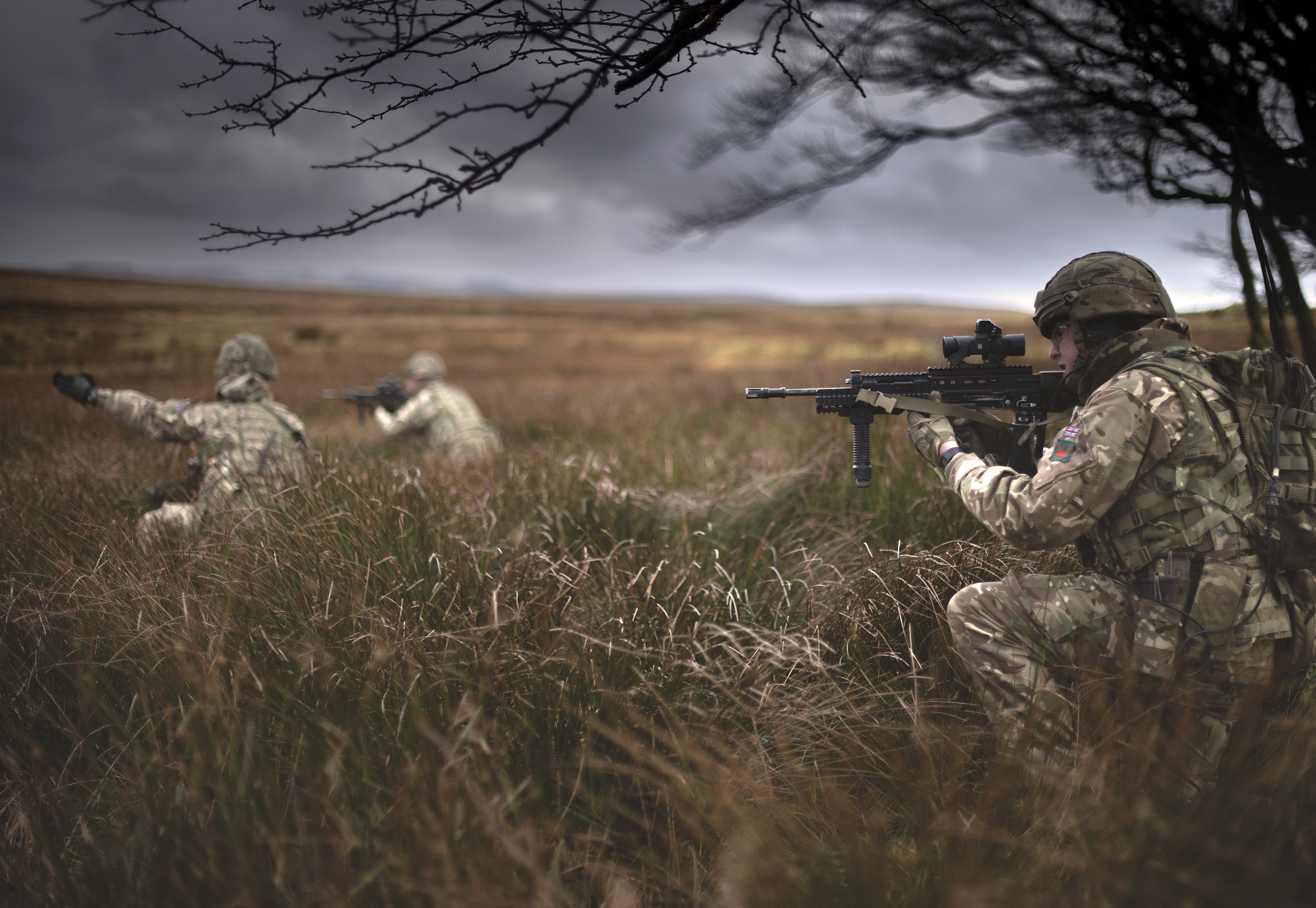
1 Rifles as part of the brigade, 2018.

By 2003, the brigade was organised as follows:

- Brigade Headquarters, at The Barracks, Brecon
- Royal Welsh Regiment (Territorial Army; one battalion) – 3rd (Volunteer) Battalion, The Royal Welsh from 2007
- 104th Regiment, Royal Artillery (Territorial Army; Air Defence)
- The Royal Monmouthshire Militia, Royal Engineers (Territorial Army)
- 157th (Wales and Midlands) Logistic Support Regiment, Royal Logistic Corps (Territorial Army)
- Wales University Officer Training Corps (Territorial Army)

=== Army 2020 ===
Under the Army 2020 programme, the brigade was renamed the 160th Infantry Brigade and Headquarters Wales, retaining its regional commitments, but now commanding several regular and territorial (becoming the Army Reserve in 2015) units. By 2017, the brigade was organised as follows:

- Brigade Headquarters, at The Barracks, Brecon
- 1st Battalion, The Royal Irish Regiment, at Clive Barracks, Tern Hill (Light Mechanised Infantry w/ Foxhound MRAPs)
- 1st Battalion, The Rifles, at Beachley Barracks, Chepstow (Light Infantry)
- 2nd Battalion, The Royal Irish Regiment (Army Reserve)
- 6th Battalion, The Rifles (Army Reserve)
- 160th Infantry Brigade & Headquarters Wales Cadet Training Team, at The Barracks, Brecon
- Clwyd and Gwynedd Army Cadet Force, at Kinmel Park Camp, Bodelwyddan
- Dyfed and Glamorgan Army Cadet Force, in Bridgend
- Gwent and Powys Army Cadet Force, in Powys

Under the Army 2020 Refine programme, the brigade dropped its operational commitments and became simply 160th (Welsh) Brigade, responsible for regional duties within Wales. Since 2019, the brigade has no operational units under its control, but does oversee cadets:

- 160th Infantry Brigade & Headquarters Wales Cadet Training Team, at The Barracks, Brecon
- Clwyd and Gwynedd Army Cadet Force, at Kinmel Park Camp, Bodelwyddan
- Dyfed and Glamorgan Army Cadet Force, in Bridgend
- Gwent and Powys Army Cadet Force, in Powys

== Bibliography ==
- Capt Cyril Falls, History of the Great War: Military Operations, Egypt and Palestine, Vol II, From June 1917 to the End of the War, Part II, London: HM Stationery Office, 1930/Uckfield: Naval & Military Press, 2013, ISBN 978-1-84574-950-7.
- Lt-Col H.F. Joslen, Orders of Battle, United Kingdom and Colonial Formations and Units in the Second World War, 1939–1945, London: HM Stationery Office, 1960/London: London Stamp Exchange, 1990, ISBN 0-948130-03-2/Uckfield: Naval & Military Press, 2003, ISBN 1-843424-74-6.
- Sir John Smyth, Bolo Whistler: The Life of General Sir Lashmer Whistler, London: Frederick Muller, 1967.
