= Bevil Wilson =

British Army general

Major-General Bevil Wilson CB DSO
- Born: 12 December 1885; Toronto, Ontario, Canada
- Died: 31 October 1975 (aged 89)
- Military career
- Allegiance: United Kingdom
- Branch: British Army
- Service years: 1905–1941
- Rank: Major-General
- Service number: 3312
- Unit: Royal Engineers
- Commands: Lahore Brigade; Nowshera Brigade; 53rd (Welsh) Infantry Division
- Conflicts: First World War; Second World War
- Awards: Companion of the Order of the Bath; Distinguished Service Order; Mentioned in dispatches (3)

Major-General Bevil Thomson Wilson, CB, DSO (12 December 1885 – 30 October 1975) was a British Army officer.

== Military career ==
Born in Canada as the son of Alexander Wilson and Mary Louise Rhynold-Barker, Wilson was, after being educated at Clifton College and then the Royal Military Academy, Woolwich, commissioned into the Royal Engineers of the British Army on 12 August 1905. The early years of his military career were spent in India and later with the Egyptian Army. By 1914 he was a captain.

He served on the Western Front, the Italian front and in the Gallipoli campaign in the First World War for which he was appointed a Companion of the Distinguished Service Order (DSO). The citation for his DSO reads:

For conspicuous gallantry and devotion to duty. He reached some canal bridges with the leading waves of infantry, and destroyed the charges of explosives before the bridges could be blown up. During an enemy counter-attack he collected what men he could and drove the enemy back, spending the rest of the day and night in organising a defensive flank under heavy fire. During the withdrawal across the canal he remained behind until orders were received for the destruction of the bridges. He showed splendid courage and initiative.

Attending the Staff College, Camberley from 1920−1921, he then served at the War Office for the next three years, until 1925, having been made a general staff officer, grade 2 there in June 1923.

He became commander of the Lahore Brigade in October 1935, commander of the Nowshera Brigade in India in January 1938 and General Officer Commanding the 53rd (Welsh) Infantry Division in Northern Ireland in June 1939 before retiring in July 1941. In August 1941 he presided over the court-martial of Josef Jakobs at the Duke of York's Headquarters in Chelsea.

== Family ==
In June 1918, he married Florence Erica Starkey; they had a son (Lieutenant-General Sir James Wilson) and a daughter.

== Bibliography ==
- Smart, Nick (2005). Biographical Dictionary of British Generals of the Second World War. Barnesley: Pen & Sword. ISBN 1844150496.

Military offices
Preceded by Gervase Thorpe	GOC 53rd (Welsh) Infantry Division; 1939–1941	Succeeded by Gerard Bucknall
