= Chegworth =

Hamlet in Kent, England

Coordinates: 51°14′36″N 0°38′53″E

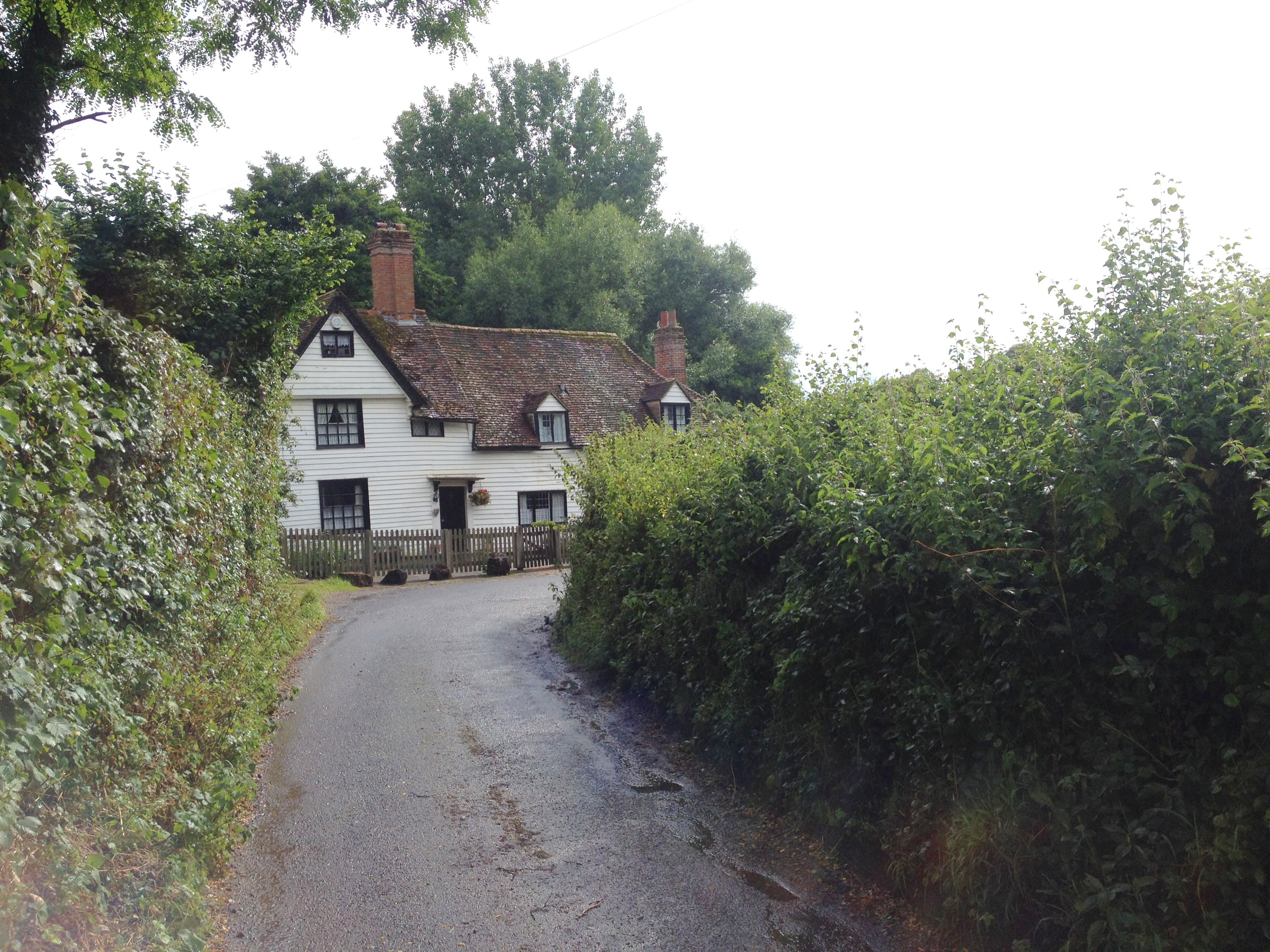
- Chegworth Lane

- Location within Kent
- OS grid reference: TQ 849 527
- Civil parish: Ulcombe
- District: Maidstone
- Shire county: Kent
- Region: South East
- Country: England
- Sovereign state: United Kingdom
- Post town: Maidstone
- Postcode district: ME17
- Police: Kent
- Fire: Kent
- Ambulance: South East Coast
- UK Parliament: Faversham and Mid Kent

Chegworth is a hamlet in the parish of Ulcombe in the Maidstone District of Kent, England. The hamlet lies along the Chegworth Road, Chegworth Lane and Water Lane, and comprises no more than 20 dwellings, including the historic Chegworth Water Mill on the River Len.

The hamlet is just south of the M20 motorway and the Eurostar high-speed railway line, and is less than a mile from Leeds Castle and Harrietsham.
