= Romer (surname) =

Romer is a surname. Notable people with the surname include:

- Wolfgang William Romer (1640–1713), Dutch/British military engineer
- Ole Rømer (1644–1710), Danish astronomer
- John Lambertus Romer (1680–1754), British military engineer
- Johann Jacob Roemer (1763–1819), Swiss physician and naturalist
- Michał Józef Römer (1778–1853), politician, writer, and notable member of the Polish-Lithuanian gentry
- Max Joseph Roemer (1791–1849), German botanist
- Isabella Frances Romer (1798–1852), English travel writer and novelist
- Edward Jan Römer (1806−1878), Polish painter
- Friedrich Adolph Roemer (1809–1869), German geologist
- Emma Romer (1814–1868), British soprano
- Ferdinand von Roemer (1818–1891), German geologist, brother of Friedrich Adolph Roemer
- John Romer (politician) (fl. 1831), Brithis politician, 19th century Governor of Bombay
- Alfred Isidore Romer, (1832–1897), Belarusian, Polish and Lithuanian painter, sculptor, carver and medalist, participant of the January Uprising (1863)
- Sir Robert Romer (1840–1918), British judge
- Edward Mateusz Römer (1848–1900), Polish painter
- Mark Romer, Baron Romer (1866–1944), British judge
- Eugeniusz Romer (1871–1954), Polish cartographer
- Lucien von Römer (1873–1965), Dutch physician, botanist and writer
- Helena Romer-Ochenkowska (1875–1947), Polish writer, playwright, opinion journalist, theatre critic and activist
- Michał Pius Römer (1880–1945), Lithuanian lawyer
- Josef “Beppo” Römer (1892–1944), German anti-fascist Freikorps leader and KPD organizer
- Alfred Romer (1894–1973), American paleontologist
- Tadeusz Romer (1894–1978), Polish diplomat and politician
- Sir Charles Romer (1897–1969), British judge
- Charles E. Roemer, II (1923–2012), Louisiana planter, businessman, and politician
- William F. Roemer, Jr. (1926–1996), American FBI agent
- Michael Roemer (1928–2025), German-born American film director, producer, and writer
- Piet Römer (1928–2012), Dutch actor
- Roy Romer (born 1928), American politician, governor of Colorado
- Elizabeth Roemer (1929–2016), American astronomer
- Karl Josef Romer (born 1932), Swiss-born Roman Catholic bishop
- Margot Römer (1938–2005), Venezuelan artist
- John Romer (Egyptologist) (born 1941), British egyptologist
- Buddy Roemer (1943–2021), American politician
- John Roemer (born 1945), American economist
- Kenneth Roemer (born 1945), American scholar of utopian, American, and Native American literature
- Astrid Roemer (1947–2026), Surinamese-Dutch writer and teacher
- Hanne Rømer (born 1949), Danish composer
- Paul Romer (born 1955), American economist
- Timothy J. Roemer (born 1956), American politician and ambassador
- Christina Romer (born 1958), American economist, chair of the Council of Economic Advisers
- David Romer (born 1958), American economist
- Marcus Romer (born 1961), British theatre director
- Emile Roemer (born 1962), Dutch politician
- Sarah Roemer (born 1984), American actress
- Peter Roemer, American engineer
- Marcel Rømer (born 1991), Danish footballer, brother of André
- André Rømer (born 1993), Danish footballer
