= Butt v Kelson =

Law case

- Court: Court of Appeal (England and Wales)
- Citation: [1952] Ch 197

Court membership
- Judges sitting: Romer LJ, Lord Evershed MR and Birkett LJ

Keywords
- Indirect investor, voting shares

Butt v Kelson [1952] Ch 197 is a UK company law and English trusts law case concerning the right of a beneficiary to direct its trustees to exercise votes on company shares that the trust possesses.

== Facts ==
Ms Kelson was one of three directors of a company called Weston-super-Mare Residential Flats Ltd. She and the other directors were also the trustees of the will of a Mr Robert Butt, which possessed 22,100 out of the 22,852 ordinary shares in the company. They had used the shares to appoint themselves as directors. After Mr Robert Henry Butt died, his son Mr Robert Arthur Butt, who was entitled to a large proportion of the residuary estate was dissatisfied at how the company was being run. He wanted to inspect all the documents which came into the directors' possession, and claimed to be able to do so by virtue of his large beneficial interest.

== Judgment ==
Romer LJ held that if Mr Arthur Butt wished to see the company documents, made a proper case for it, and was not met by any objection of other beneficiaries, he should be allowed. This was so, not because directors could be compelled qua directors, but because it would avoid them being compelled to use their voting power, which they held on trust, to make them do so. The beneficiaries were entitled to be treated as though they were the registered shareholders in respect of trust shares. If necessary, they could compel the trustee directors to use their votes as the beneficiaries. If the beneficiaries themselves were not in agreement then the court could exercise the power.

Romer LJ said the following.

The right of a beneficiary, or of the beneficiaries if they are united, is to compel the trustees to use their voting power in the best interests of the trust estate even to the extent, if need be and if the voting power is sufficiently large, of altering the articles of association. But what he says the beneficiaries have no right to do is to regard the directors' powers as forming part of the trust estate. He says that is precisely what the plaintiff in the present case is trying to do and what the judge below has held that he is entitled to do.

[...]

What I think is the true way of looking at the matter is that which was presented to this court by Sir Lynn Ungoed-Thomas, that is that the beneficiaries are entitled to be treated as though they were the registered shareholders in respect of trust shares, with the advantages and disadvantages (for example, restrictions imposed by the articles) which are involved in that position, and that they can compel the trustee directors if necessary to use their votes as the beneficiaries, or as the court, if the beneficiaries themselves are not in agreement, think proper, even to the extent of altering the articles of association if the trust shares carry votes sufficient for that purpose.

In the present case, the trust holding gives complete control over the management of the company, and the sort of way in which I approach the plaintiff's right in this matter is this, that if he, firstly, specifies the documents of the company which he wishes to see; secondly, makes out a proper case for seeing them, and, thirdly, is not met by any valid objection by the other beneficiaries or by the directors from the point of view of the company, then the directors should give inspection, not because they can be compelled to do so as directors, but as a short circuit, if one may so describe it, to an order compelling them to use their voting powers so as to bring about what the plaintiff desires to achieve.

Evershed MR and Birkett LJ concurred.

== See also ==
- UK company law
- English trust law
- Fiduciary
- Kirby v Wilkins [1929] Ch 444
- Schmidt v Rosewood Trust Ltd [2003] UKPC 26, [65]
