= Edward Römer =

Edward Römer may refer to:

- Edward Jan Römer, Polish writer, translator, social activist and painter
- Edward Mateusz Römer, his son, Baltic-German/Polish painter
