= Judge Peterson =

Judge Peterson may refer to:

- Arthur Frederick Peterson (1859–1922), judge of the English High Court of Justice
- Clark A. Peterson (fl. 1990s–2020s), Idaho state magistrate judge in Coeur d'Alene
- James D. Peterson (born 1957), judge of the United States District Court for the Western District of Wisconsin
- Randolph W. Peterson (born 1953), judge of the Minnesota Court of Appeals
- Rosanna M. Peterson (born 1951), judge of the United States District Court for the Eastern District of Washington

== See also ==
- Justice Peterson (disambiguation)
