= Michał Römer =

Michał Römer may refer to:

- Michał Józef Römer (1778–1853)
- Michał Pius Römer (1880–1945)
