= Helena Romer-Ochenkowska =

Polish writer

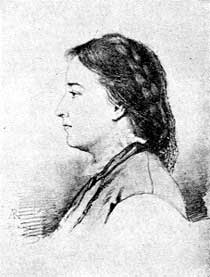
- Born: 2 August 1875; Vilnius, Russian Empire
- Died: 26 March 1947 (aged 71); Toruń, Poland
- Occupation: writer, journalist

Helena Romer-Ochenkowska (2 August 1875 – 26 March 1947) was a Polish writer, playwright, opinion journalist, columnist and theatre critic. She also engaged in social and education activism, especially promoting amateur theatre in the Vilnius region.

== Early life and education ==
Helena Romer was born on 2 August 1875, in Vilnius, to painter Alfred Izydor Romer and aristocrat Wanda née Sulistrowska. Her great-grandfather was the politician Michał Józef Römer. She received her education at a private girls' school in Kraków, then from 1897 gave classes in secret to the villagers of her estate in Karolinów. Later, she studied at the École des Hautes Sciences Sociales in Paris, where she wrote a thesis titled Immigration allemande en Russie et en Polgone. She married Henryk Ochenkowski, but the couple later separated.

== Career ==
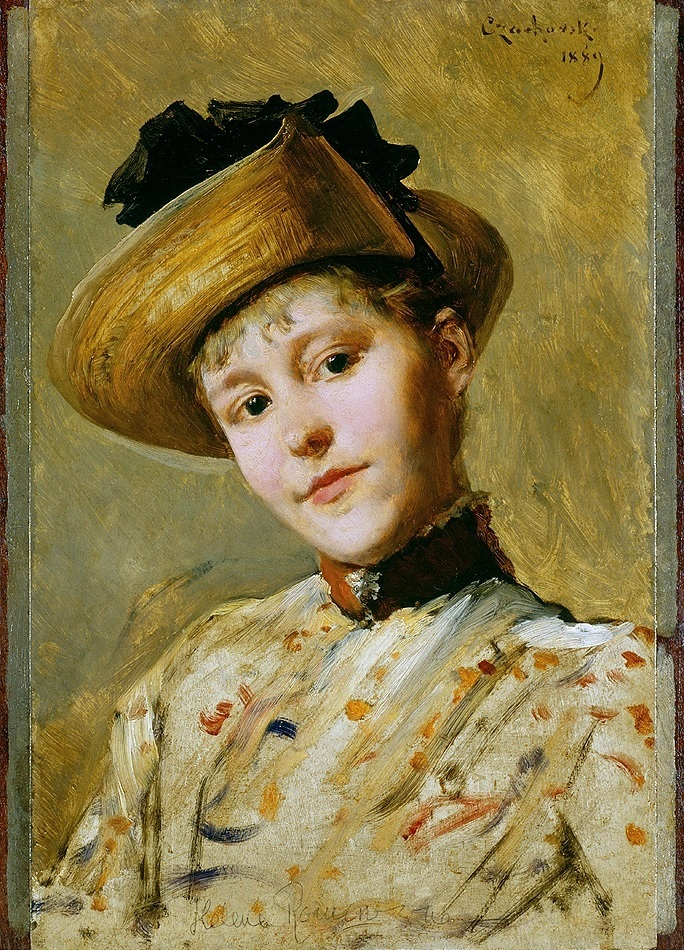
Portrait of Helena Romer, 1889, Władysław Czachórski

She debuted in 1904 with Karylla, czyli miłość patriotyczna. Two years later she started regularly publishing her literary work, reviews and columns. While living in Paris and Belgium for a couple of years, she wrote for the Kurier Warszawski. On top of writing, she also lobbied for wider access to education: during World War I she opened four schools in the Vilnius area, then gave lectures in Vilnius.

After the war, Helena wrote for most of the Vilnius press and was on the editorial team of the Kurier Wileński. She engaged in various cultural projects and supported educational activities, as well as amateur theatre, for which she wrote a number of plays. Helena believed that theatres should provide the space for integrating the many cultures and minorities of Vilnius. She became known as an authority on the region. Her writings gained popularity, especially short story collections Książka o nich (1922), Swoi ludzie (1922) and Tutejsi (1931), which focused on local life and history. In 1929, she was decorated with the Officer's Cross of the Order of Polonia Restituta.

She spent World War II in Vilnius, then moved to Toruń, where she died on 26 March 1947.

== Selected works ==
- Karylla, czyli miłość patriotyczna, 1904
- Majaki, 1910
- Książka o nich, 1922
- Swoi ludzie, 1922
- Wesele na Wileńszczyźnie, 1929
- Tutejsi, 1931
- Rok 1863 na Litwie, 1934
