= Henry MacCall =

British Army officer

Major-General Henry MacCall CB
- Born: 15 August 1845; Paris, France
- Died: 22 July 1921 (aged 75); Southsea, Hampshire, England
- Military career
- Allegiance: United Kingdom
- Branch: British Army
- Rank: Major-General
- Commands: 1st Bn, King's Royal Rifle Corps; 41st Regimental District; 59th (2nd North Midland) Division
- Conflicts: Isazai Expedition; Chitral Expedition; Siege of Malakand; First World War
- Awards: Companion of the Order of the Bath

Major-General Henry Blackwood MacCall CB (15 August 1845 – 22 July 1921) was a senior British Army officer.

== Military career ==
MacCall was commissioned into the 60th Regiment of Foot on 16 February 1864.

He was promoted to lieutenant colonel on 1 July 1891 and to brevet colonel on 1 July 1895 and served as commanding officer of the 1st Battalion, KRRC, with the Isazai Expedition in 1892, the Chitral Expedition in 1895 and the Siege of Malakand in 1897. He went on to receive a promotion to colonel and to be commander of the 41st Regimental District in Cardiff on 8 April 1897, then transferred to British India as Deputy Adjutant General in India in February 1899. After the outbreak of the Second Boer War saw several senior officers posted to South Africa in late 1899, MacCall was appointed temporary in command of the Peshawar district as its commander received another posting on 4 January 1900. He transferred to the Bangalore command in early August 1900, and received a substantive appointment as commander of a 2nd Class District in India in 1901.

He retired in August 1902 but was recalled to serve as General Officer Commanding 59th (2nd North Midland) Division on Home Service from January 1915 to November 1915.

Military offices
New title	GOC 59th (2nd North Midland) Division; January 1915 – November 1915	Succeeded by Raymond Reade
