= 59th (2nd North Midland) Division =

Former British Army infantry division

2nd North Midland Division 59th (2nd North Midland) Division 59th Division
- Division insignia
- Active: 6 January 1915 – 1 September 1919
- Country: United Kingdom
- Branch: Territorial Force
- Type: Infantry
- Size: Division
- Engagements: Easter Rising; Menin Road Ridge; Polygon Wood; Bourlon Wood; St Quentin; Bailleul; Kemmel Ridge; Albert; Final Advance in Artois and Flanders

Commanders
- Notable commanders: Maj-Gen Raymond Reade; Maj-Gen Arthur Sandbach; Maj-Gen Cecil Romer; Maj-Gen Sir Robert Whigham; Maj-Gen Sir Nevill Smyth, VC; Maj-Gen Charles Budworth

The 59th (2nd North Midland) Division was an infantry division of the British Army during World War I. It was formed in late 1914/early 1915 as a 2nd Line Territorial Force formation raised as a duplicate of the 46th (North Midland) Division. After training in the United Kingdom and seeing service in the Easter Rising in April 1916, the division joined the British Expeditionary Force (BEF) on the Western Front in early 1917. It saw action at Ypres and Cambrai, and was almost destroyed during the German Army's Spring Offensive in March 1918. The reconstituted division took part in the final advances of the war.

== Origin ==
The formation of Reserve or 2nd Line units of the Territorial Force (TF) was authorised on 31 August 1914, and the units were quickly formed from the flood of volunteers coming forward, trained by those men of the 1st Line TF who had not signed up for overseas service or were medically unfit. At first the men had to live at home, and parade in civilian clothes until the county TF associations were able to issue clothing and equipment. In January 1915, the 2nd North Midland was created as an exact duplicate of the 1st North Midland Division, the units being differentiated by '1/' or '2/' prefix. The 1st North Midland Division was the first complete TF formation to reach the Western Front, where it received the designation 46th (North Midland) Division. The 2nd Line division was designated 59th (2nd North Midland) Division in August 1915.

== Order of battle ==
The composition of 59th (2nd North Midland Division) until May 1918 was as follows:

=== 176th (2/1st Staffordshire) Brigade ===
- 2/5th Battalion, South Staffordshire Regiment (drafted and disbanded 1 January 1918)
- 2/6th Battalion, South Staffordshire Regiment
- 2/5th Battalion, North Staffordshire Regiment (absorbed 1/5th Bn 30 January 1918 and became 5th Bn)
- 2/6th Battalion, North Staffordshire Regiment
- 174th Company, Machine Gun Corps (joined 24 February 1917; to 59th Battalion, MGC 7–8 March 1918)
- 176th Trench Mortar Battery (formed 20 January 1917; temporarily disbanded 8 May 1918)

The infantry battalions of 176th Bde were reduced to training cadres on 9 May 1918 and transferred to 66th (2nd East Lancashire) Division on 30 May 1918.

=== 177th (2/1st Lincoln and Leicester) Brigade ===
- 2/4th Battalion, Lincolnshire Regiment (absorbed 1/4th Bn and became 4th Bn)
- 2/5th Battalion, Lincolnshire Regiment (disbanded 31 July 1918)
- 2/4th Battalion, Leicestershire Regiment
- 2/5th Battalion, Leicestershire Regiment (drafted and disbanded 1 January 1918)
- 177th Company, MGC (joined 19 February 1917; to 59th Battalion, MGC 7–8 March 1918)
- 177th Trench Mortar Battery (formed 20 January 1917; temporarily disbanded 8 May 1918)

The infantry battalions of 177th Bde were reduced to training cadres on 9 May 1918 and transferred to 16th (Irish) Division and 30th Division.

=== 178th (2/1st Nottinghamshire and Derbyshire) Brigade ===
- 2/5th Battalion, Sherwood Foresters
- 2/6th Battalion, Sherwood Foresters
- 2/7th Robin Hood Battalion, Sherwood Foresters (absorbed 1/7th Bn and became 7th Bn)
- 2/8th Battalion, Sherwood Foresters (drafted and disbanded 1 January 1918)
- 178th Company, MGC (joined 17 February 1917; to 59th Battalion, MGC 7–8 March 1918)
- 178th Trench Mortar Battery (formed 20 January 1917; temporarily disbanded 7 May 1918)

The infantry battalions of 178th Bde were reduced to training cadres on 7 May 1918 and transferred to 16th (Irish) and 30th Divisions.

=== Support troops ===
Mounted Troops

- 2/1st Northamptonshire Yeomanry (left in April 1916)
- 59th (2/1st North Midland) Cyclist Company, Army Cyclist Corps (joined 17 March 1915; did not accompany division to France)
- B Squadron, North Irish Horse (attached from 6 August 1915 until April 1916)
- 2/2nd County of London Yeomanry (attached from 20 February until April 1916)
- C Squadron, 21st Northumberland Hussars (28 March 1916 to 22 January 1917)

Artillery

- 2/I North Midland Brigade, Royal Field Artillery (2/1st, 2/2nd, and 2/3rd Lincolnshire Batteries, and 2/I North Midland Brigade Ammunition Column) (numbered CCXCV Bde in May 1916 and 2/1st Hampshire Royal Horse Artillery joined as D Battery; served with other divisions 22 March to 27 August 1918)
- 2/II North Midland Brigade, RFA (2/1st, 2/2nd, and 2/3rd Staffordshire Batteries, and 2/II North Midland Brigade Ammunition Column) (numbered CCXCVI Bde in May 1916 and 2/1st Essex Royal Horse Artillery joined as D Battery; served with other divisions 22 March to 27 August 1918)
- 2/III North Midland Brigade, RFA (2/4th, 2/5th, and 2/6th Staffordshire Batteries, and 2/III North Midland Brigade Ammunition Column) (numbered CCXCVII Bde in May 1916 and 2/1st Glamorganshire Royal Horse Artillery joined as D Battery; broken up before the division embarked for France)
- 2/IV North Midland (Howitzer) Brigade, RFA (2/1st and 2/2nd Derbyshire (H) Batteries, and 2/IV North Midland (H) Brigade Ammunition Column) (numbered CCXCVIII Bde in May 1916; left on 4 April 1917)
- 1/IV Home Counties (Howitzer) Brigade, RFA (10 March to 27 June 1915)
- 2/1st North Midland (Staffordshire) Heavy Battery, Royal Garrison Artillery (until 18 April 1916)
- 1/1st Wessex (Hampshire) Heavy Battery, RGA (joined 13 March 1915, to 60th (2/2nd London) Division 7 April 1915)
- 2/1st Wessex (Hampshire) Heavy Battery, RGA (joined 20 February 1916, drafted to 1/1st Wessex October 1916)
- 59th Divisional Trench Mortar Brigade, RFA
  - V.59 Heavy Trench Mortar Battery (formed 21 January 1917; left in March 1918)
  - X.59 Medium Trench Mortar Battery (formed 21 January 1917)
  - Y.59 Medium Trench Mortar Battery (formed 21 January 1917)
  - Z.59 Medium Trench Mortar Battery (formed 21 January 1917; absorbed by X and Y in March 1918)
- 59th (North Midland) Divisional Ammunition Column, RFA (absorbed brigade ammunition columns 31 July 1916)

Engineers

- 59th Divisional Engineers
  - 1/3rd North Midland Field Company, Royal Engineers (later numbered 467th Field Company)
  - 2/1st North Midland Field Company, RE (joined 46th Division 10 July 1915)
  - 2/2nd North Midland Field Company, RE (joined 4 February 1915; later numbered 469th Field Company)
  - 3/1st North Midland Field Company, RE (joined 3 February 1915, later numbered 470th Field Company)
  - 59th (2/1st North Midland) Signal Company, RE

Pioneers

- 6/7th Bn Royal Scots Fusiliers (joined 21 February 1918; reduced to training cadre in 176th Bde 7–10 May)

Machine Guns

  - 200th Company, MGC (formed 20 January 1917; left behind when division embarked for France; rejoined on 18 April 1917)
  - 201st Company, MGC (formed 25 October 1916; joined 62nd (2nd West Riding) Division in April 1917)
  - 202nd Company, MGC (formed 20 January 1917; joined 66th (2nd East Lancashire) Division in April 1917)
  - 203rd Company, MGC (formed 20 January 1917; joined 66th Division in April 1917)
- 59th Battalion, MGC (formed on 7–8 March 1918; reduced to training cadre May 1918)
  - 176th Company, MGC (moved from 176th Brigade)
  - 177th Company, MGC (moved from 177th Brigade)
  - 178th Company, MGC (moved from 178th Brigade)
  - 200th Company, MGC (see above)

Medical Services

- 2/1st North Midland Field Ambulance, Royal Army Medical Corps
- 2/2nd North Midland Field Ambulance, RAMC
- 2/3rd North Midland Field Ambulance, RAMC
- 59th Sanitary Section (left on 18 May 1917)
- 59th (2/1st North Midland) Mobile Veterinary Section, Army Veterinary Corps

Transport

- 59th (2/1st North Midland) Divisional Train, Army Service Corps
  - 513th Horse Transport Company, ASC
  - 514th HT Company, ASC
  - 515th HT Company, ASC
  - 516th HT Company, ASC

Labour

- 250th Divisional Employment Company, Labour Corps (formed 16 June 1917)

== Training ==
Early in January 1915, the units assigned to the division concentrated round Luton, where it formed part of Third Army in Central Force. In February the men were issued with .256-in Japanese Ariska rifles with which to train, and it was not until November 1915–March 1916 that these were replaced with .303 SMLE rifles and Lewis guns. Similarly, the gunners had to train with 'Quaker' guns – logs of wood mounted on cart wheels – until March 1915 when a few 90 mm French guns arrived for training. Later, some 15-pounder field guns and obsolete 5-inch howitzers were received, without sights.

In June 1915, the 2nd Line units began to send drafts of reinforcements to their 1st Line parents serving on the Western Front, while the Home Service men were transferred to provisional battalions. This reduced the strength and delayed the training of the division. In July 1915 it moved to a training area around St Albans. Here in early 1916 the artillery finally received their establishment of horses, 18-pounder field guns and 4.5-inch howitzers.

== Ireland ==
The 59th was the 'mobile division' in Home Forces, held in readiness to combat a landing along the East Coast; when the Easter Rising broke out in Dublin on 24 April 1916, it was ordered into immediate readiness and despatched to Ireland, the first TF formation to serve there. Here, units of the division – many with only a few weeks' training – were hastily thrown into combat, some suffering many casualties; the 2/7th and 2/8th Sherwood Foresters lost over two hundred men killed or wounded at Mount Street on 26 April and at the South Dublin Union on 27 April. After the end of fighting in Dublin, the 59th (2nd North Midland) Division moved to the Curragh for further training until the end of the year.

The division returned to England in January 1917 and began final battle training at Fovant, where there was a large purpose-built camp on the edge of the Salisbury Plain training area, before embarking for France on 17 February.

== Western Front ==
=== Polygon Wood ===
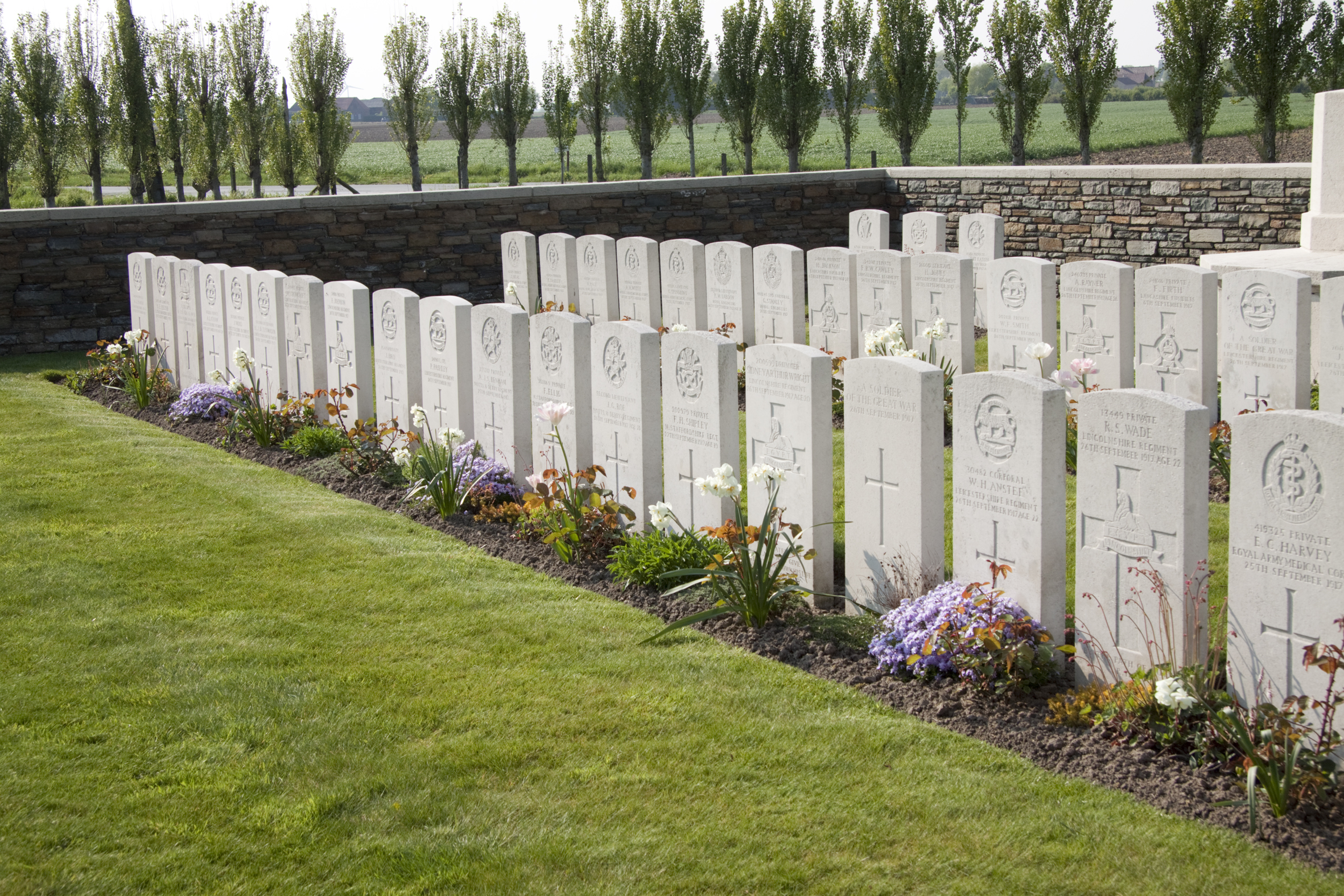
Bridge House Cemetery, named after a nearby farmhouse, was made by the 59th (North Midland) Division in September 1917. All but five of the 45 burials are of men of the division, and all but one date from the Battle of Polygon Wood.

The 59th Division took part in following the German Retreat to Hindenburg Line in March and April, but it was not until September that it was engaged in its first full-scale action, the phase of the 3rd Ypres Offensive known as the Battle of the Menin Road Ridge. This was a carefully prepared assault with massive artillery preparation, and most of the objectives were taken easily. The next phase, the Battle of Polygon Wood (26 September), was equally successful, with 59th Division advancing steadily behind its barrage onto the final objectives.

=== Bourlon Wood ===
59th Division was next moved south to join in the Battle of Cambrai. The division entered the recently captured line between Cantaing and Bourlon Wood on 28 November. Fierce German counter-attacks began on 30 November. Two infantry assaults were made against 176 Bde, but both attacks were easily broken up under British artillery fire. Lance-Corporal John Thomas of the 2/5th North Staffords was awarded the Victoria Cross for his gallantry in reconnoitring these attacks. That night the rest of 176 Bde in Bourlon Wood were subjected to a violent bombardment of high explosive and gas shells, but the division was not directly attacked the following morning. By 4 December the decision had been made to withdraw from the Bourlon Salient, and 59th Division held covering positions while this was carried out. By 7 December the British were back on the line that they would hold for the coming winter.

As a result of the BEF's manpower crisis at the end of 1917, the establishment of each infantry brigade was reduced from four to three battalions in January 1918. In 59th Division, each brigade saw one battalion disbanded to provide reinforcements, and one other absorbed its 1st Line parent from the 46th Division.

=== Spring Offensive ===
When the German spring offensive opened on 21 March 1918 (the Battle of St Quentin), 59th Division was holding the line of the Bullecourt Salient, with a thinly held 'Forward Zone', covering Bullecourt itself. This was where the heaviest German attack fell, following a hurricane bombardment and covered by morning mist. The battalions in front were driven from their defences and forced back through the village. Here and in the defences further to the north west a few survivors fought on for some hours. 176th and 178th Brigades were virtually destroyed (only one front-line officer of 176 Brigade made it back), and the reserves moving up were swamped. The division's field guns in the forward zone were captured after firing over open sights at the advancing Germans. The line was held by rear details, including the gunners using rifles and Lewis guns. Only two batteries of 59th Divisional Artillery escaped.

Over the next few days, 177th Brigade and the remaining divisional artillery remained in action under the command of 40th Division, fighting rearguard actions during the British Army's 'Great Retreat'. 59th Division was sent north to recuperate (without its artillery), but there the survivors were caught up in the second phase of the Spring Offensive at the Battle of Bailleul (14–15 April) and the Battle of Kemmel Ridge (17–18 April). About 2,000 men of the division, under Brig-Gen C.H.L. James of 177th Brigade, formed 'James's Force' and fought on for a couple more days under the command of 49th (West Riding) Division, but then the exhausted 59th Division was withdrawn from the front line.

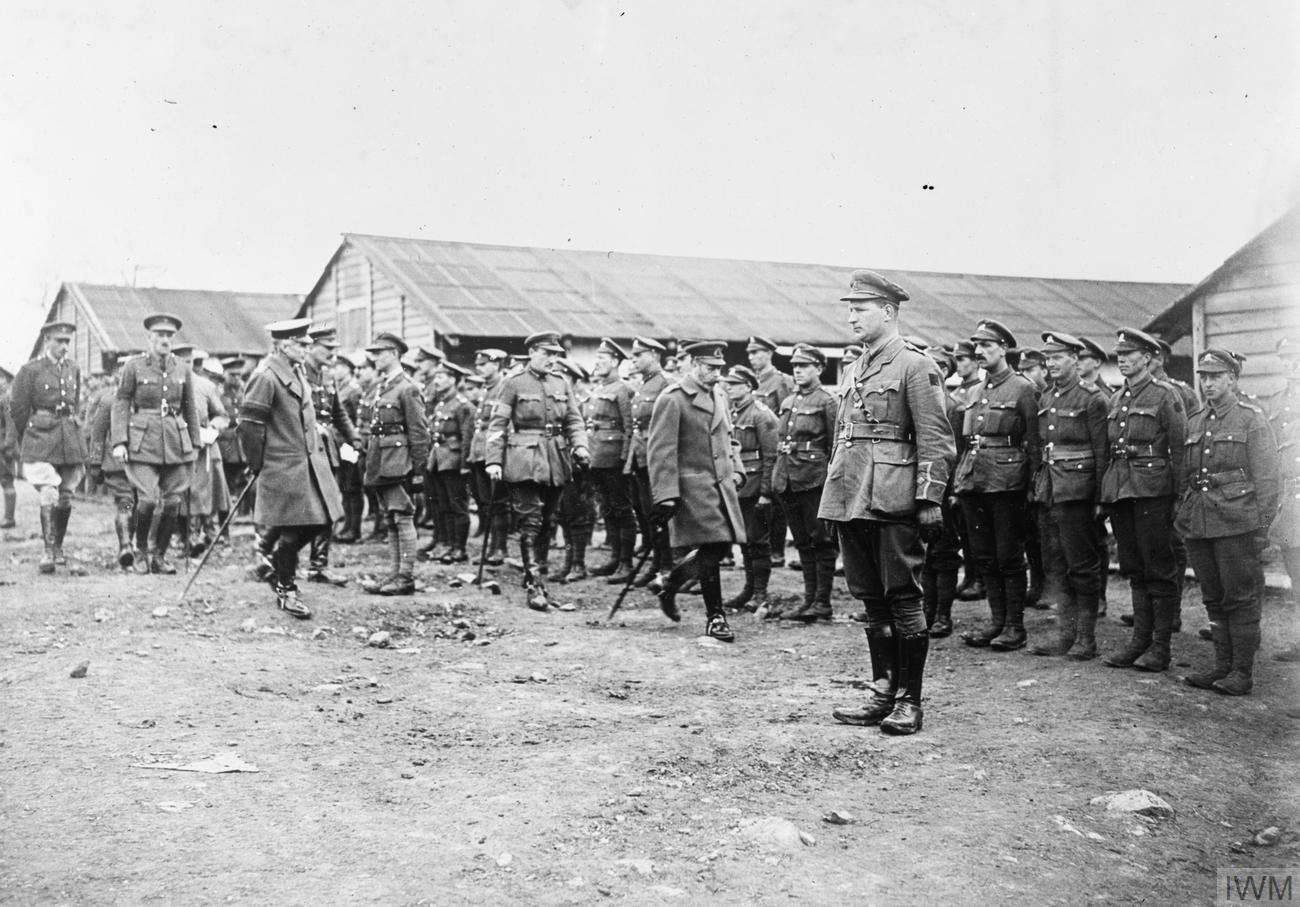
King George V and General Sir Henry Horne inspecting men of the 2/6th Battalion, South Staffordshire Regiment, at Gauchin, 30 March 1918. They are accompanied by Brigadier General Thomas George Cope and Major General Cecil Romer.

In May 1918 the shattered 59th Division was temporarily disbanded at Saint-Omer and its battalions and trench mortar batteries reduced to training cadres, the surplus men being drafted to other units.

However, the Divisional Artillery (CCXCV and CCXCVI Bdes) remained in the Line, serving with various formations as required: 62nd (2nd West Riding) Division (15–24 April and 17 May–19 June), 37th Division (24 April–17 May), XVIII Corps (23 June–1 July), 5th Division (1–8 August) and 61st (2nd South Midland) Division (8–26 August).

The 59th Division was reconstructed at Hestrus from Garrison Guard battalions sent from the United Kingdom. Until June, it was employed in digging rear defences, then it underwent training to enable it to hold a sector of the front line. On 25 July the reconstructed division went back into the line.

== Reconstruction ==
The order of battle of the reconstructed 59th Division (the 'North Midland' designation was no longer relevant) was as follows:

=== 176th Brigade ===
- 6th/7th Battalion, Royal Scots Fusiliers (joined as training cadre from divisional pioneers 7–10 May 1918, left for England 18 June 1918)
- 1st Provisional Garrison Guard Battalion (joined from Reserve Army 13 May 1918; became 17th Garrison Battalion, Worcestershire Regiment 25 May 1918, left 18 June 1918)
- 2nd Provisional Garrison Guard Battalion (joined from Reserve Army 13 May 1918; transferred to 177th Bde 22 May 1918)
- 3rd Provisional Garrison Guard Battalion (joined from Reserve Army 13 May 1918; transferred to 177th Bde 22 May 1918)
- 4th Provisional Garrison Guard Battalion (joined from Reserve Army 13 May 1918; became 23rd Garrison Battalion, Lancashire Fusiliers 25 May 1918, left 18 June 1918)
- 5th Provisional Garrison Guard Battalion (joined from Reserve Army 13 May 1918, became 17th Garrison Guard Battalion, Royal Sussex Regiment 25 May, then 17th Battalion 16 July 1918)
- 4th Garrison Guard Battalion, Royal Welch Fusiliers (joined 16 May 1918, became 26th Battalion 16 July 1918)
- 25th Garrison Guard Battalion, King's (Liverpool Regiment) (joined 16 June 1918, became 25th Battalion 16 July 1918)
- 176th Trench Mortar Battery (reformed 11 July 1918)

=== 177th Brigade ===
- 2/6th Garrison Guard Battalion, Durham Light Infantry, (joined from England 10 May 1918; became 2/6th Battalion 16 July 1918)
- 11th Garrison Guard Battalion, Somerset Light Infantry (joined from England 12 May 1918; became 11th Battalion 16 July 1918)
- 15th Garrison Guard Battalion, Essex Regiment (joined from England 12 May 1918; became 15th Battalion 16 July 1918)
- 2nd Provisional Garrison Guard Battalion (joined from 176th Bde 22 May 1918; redesignated 25th Garrison Battalion, King's Royal Rifle Corps 25 May, and became divisional pioneers 16 June 1918)
- 3rd Provisional Garrison Guard Battalion (joined from 176th Bde 22 May 1918; redesignated 13th Garrison Battalion, Duke of Wellington's Regiment 25 May; to 178th Bde 16 June 1918)
- 177th Trench Mortar Battery (reformed 17 August 1918)

=== 178th Brigade ===
- 36th Garrison Guard Battalion, Northumberland Fusiliers (joined from England 12 May 1918, became 36th Battalion 16 July 1918)
- 11th Garrison Guard Battalion, Royal Scots Fusiliers (joined from United Kingdom 12 May 1918, became 11th Battalion 16 July 1918)
- 2nd Garrison Guard Battalion, Royal Irish Regiment (joined from Ireland 17 May 1918, became 8th Garrison Battalion 25 May and left 19 June 1918)
- 13th Garrison Battalion, Duke of Wellington's Regiment (from 177th Bde 16 June 1918; became 13th Battalion 16 July 1918)
- 25th Garrison Guard Battalion, Cheshire Regiment (joined from England 24 May 1918, left 19 June 1918)
- 178th Trench Mortar Battery (reformed 24 June 1918)

=== Support troops ===
Mounted Troops

- XI Corps Mounted Troops (attached 17–21 October and 9 –14 November 1918)
  - 1st King Edward's Horse
  - 11th Cyclist Battalion, ACC

Artillery

- CCXCV Brigade, RFA
  - A, B, C and D (H) Batteries
- CCXCVI Brigade, RFA
  - A, B, C and D (H) Batteries
- 59th Divisional Trench Mortar Brigade, RFA
  - X.59 and Y.59 Medium Trench Mortar Batteries
- 59th Divisional Ammunition Column, RFA

Engineers

- 59th Divisional Engineers
  - 467th, 469th and 470th Field Companies, RE
  - 59th Signal Company, RE

Pioneers

- 25th Garrison Bn, King's Royal Rifle Corps (from 177th Bde 16 June 1918; dropped 'Garrison' title on 16 July 1918)

Machine Guns

- 25th Battalion, MGC (joined from 25th Division from 23 July to 19 October 1918)
  - 7th, 74th, 75th and 195th Companies
- 200th Battalion, MGC (joined on 2 October 1918)
  - A, B, C and D Companies

Medical Services

- 2/1st, 2/2nd and 2/3rd North Midland Field Ambulances, RAMC
- 59th Mobile Veterinary Section, AVC

Transport

- 59th Divisional Train, ASC
  - 513th, 514th, 515th and 516th Horse Transport Companies

Labour

- 250th Divisional Employment Company, Labour Corps

Attached Allied Troops

- III Artillery Brigade, Portuguese Expeditionary Corps (CEP) (3 October to 15 November 1918)
- 14th Infantry Battalion, CEP (3 October to 2 November 1918)
- 15th Infantry Battalion, CEP (3 October to 15 November 1918)

== Advance to Victory ==
On 21 August the 59th Division once more took part in active operations, at the Battle of Albert. 59th Divisional Artillery rejoined on 27 August. From 2 October until 11 November 1918 the division participated in the final advance in Artois and Flanders. On 2 October, 59th Division ordered two minor operations in which detachments advanced under cover of smoke and a creeping barrage; these determined that the enemy had retired, and so the division advanced against little opposition. On 16 October the division fought its way through the old defences of Lille, and liberated the city against minimal opposition the following day. Opposition stiffened at the River Schelde was approached, but this was crossed in early November. The Armistice on 11 November found the division astride the Schelde north of Tournai.

== Demobilisation ==
After the Armistice, 59th Division moved first to the area around Lille and then around Béthune. It was engaged in training and education. On 8–10 December it sent 178th Brigade, with 2/2 NM Field Ambulance and 516 Co ASC to Dunkirk to operate a dispersal camp for miners who were being demobilised early from the British Expeditionary Force. On 13–15 January 1919, 177th Brigade moved to Dieppe for demobilisation duties, where it was joined on 25 January by the pioneer battalion to build the demobilisation camp. On 8 March, Divisional HQ moved to Calais, and during the month other units followed. On 21–23 May, the units of 176th Brigade left for service in Egypt (the Brigade HQ was disbanded in July) and were replaced on 16 June by 19th Brigade transferred from 33rd Division:

19th Brigade

- 6th Battalion, Queen's Royal Regiment (West Surrey)
- 5th/6th Battalion, Cameronians (Scottish Rifles)
- 10th Battalion, Cameronians

By now, the division's responsibility was to train drafts for the forces serving in Egypt and the Black Sea. 59th Divisional Artillery was demobilised on 8 August, and on 29 August orders arrived to break up the rest of the division. Divisional HQ closed on 1 September 1919, and during the month the remaining cadres returned to England.

== General Officers Commanding ==
The following officers commanded 59th Division during its existence:

- Brig-Gen Henry MacCall, appointed 6 January 1915
- Maj-Gen Raymond Reade, appointed 14 November 1915
- Maj-Gen Arthur Sandbach, appointed 14 February 1916
- Maj-Gen Cecil Romer, appointed 9 April 1917
- Maj-Gen Sir Robert Whigham, appointed 19 June 1918
- Maj-Gen Sir Nevill Smyth, VC, appointed 28 August 1918
- Maj-Gen Charles Budworth, appointed 19 July 1919

== Notable personnel ==
- John Crocker

== See also ==
- List of British divisions in World War I

== Bibliography ==
- Becke, Maj A.F. History of the Great War: Order of Battle of Divisions, Part 2b: The 2nd-Line Territorial Force Divisions (57th–69th), with the Home-Service Divisions (71st–73rd) and 74th and 75th Divisions, London: HM Stationery Office, 1937/Uckfield: Naval & Military Press, 2007, ISBN 1-847347-39-8.
- Edmonds, Brig-Gen Sir James E. (1992) History of the Great War: Military Operations, France and Belgium 1917, Vol II, Messines and Third Ypres (Passchendaele), London: HM Stationery Office, 1948/Imperial War Museum and Battery Press, ISBN 0-90162775-5.
- Edmonds, Brig-Gen Sir James E. (1995) History of the Great War: Military Operations, France and Belgium 1918, Vol I, The German March Offensive and its Preliminaries, London: Macmillan, 1935/Imperial War Museum and Battery Press, ISBN 0-89839-219-5.
- Brig-Gen Sir James E. & Maxwell-Hyslop, (1993) Lt-Col R. History of the Great War: Military Operations, France and Belgium 1918, Vol V, 26th September–11th November, The Advance to Victory, London: HM Stationery Office, 1947/Imperial War Museum and Battery Press, ISBN 978-1-870423-06-9.
- Middlebrook, Martin (1983) The Kaiser's Battle, 21 March 1918: The First Day of the German Spring Offensive, London: Allen Lane, 1978/Penguin, ISBN 0-14-017135-5.
- Farndale, Gen Sir Martin (1986) History of the Royal Regiment of Artillery: Western Front 1914–18, Woolwich: Royal Artillery Institution, ISBN 1-870114-00-0.
- Miles, Capt Wilfred History of the Great War: Military Operations, France and Belgium 1917, Vol III, The Battle of Cambrai, London: HM Stationery Office, 1948/Uckfield: Naval and Military Press, 2009, ISBN 978-1-84574724-4.
- Wolff, Leon In Flanders Fields: the 1917 Campaign, London: Longmans, 1959/Corgi, 1966.
