= Raymond Reade =

British Army general

Major-General Raymond Reade CB CMG
- Reade in 1917
- Born: c. 1861; Chelsea, London, England
- Died: 18 October 1943 (aged 83); Samford, Suffolk, England
- Military career
- Allegiance: United Kingdom
- Branch: British Army
- Service years: 1880–1920
- Rank: Major-General
- Commands: 68th (2nd Welsh) Division; 59th (2nd North Midland) Division; Straits Settlements; Royal Military College of Canada
- Conflicts: First World War
- Awards: Companion of the Order of the Bath; Companion of the Order of St. Michael and St. George; Commander of the Royal Order of George I (Greece); Medal of Military Merit, 1st Class (Greece)

Major-General Raymond Northland Revell Reade, CB, CMG (c. 1861 – 18 October 1943) was a British Army general and Commandant of the Royal Military College of Canada.

== Background ==
Born in Chelsea, London, he was the son of John Page Reade and his wife Lady Mary Stuart Knox, daughter of Thomas Knox, 2nd Earl of Ranfurly. He was educated at Eton College and went to the Royal Military College, Sandhurst.

== Military career ==
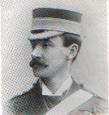
Reade as a young officer.

Reade was commissioned as a second lieutenant into the 85th Regiment of Foot, later the King's Shropshire Light Infantry (KSLI), on 14 January 1880. He was promoted to captain in October 1887. He was seconded for service on the staff on 6 December 1889.

After serving as a temporary major in West Africa, which on 6 April 1898 became substantive, and after receiving a promotion to lieutenant colonel while on half-pay on 8 March 1901, he served as commandant of Royal Military College of Canada from 1901 to 1905, during which time he was promoted to brevet colonel. His criticism of poor RMC examination marks in French, physics and chemistry in 1901 and surveying and physics 1904 led to reforms at the college: smaller classes for French, entrance tests in physics and chemistry, and separate instructors for physics and surveying. He also built up the RMC library and extended library privileges to Permanent Force Officers in the Kingston, Ontario, area. A 25-bed hospital was also constructed adjacent to the education block, and a large gymnasium was constructed south of the Stone Frigate. He secured quarters for the staff-adjutant and his family in what was later called Panet House, after the first resident. He built an extension to the rear of the Stone Frigate for bathroom facilities.

Reade, promoted to colonel in February 1907, became an assistant adjutant and quartermaster general (AAQMG) in October, served in Malta and Scotland. After being promoted to major general in July 1912, he became general officer commanding (GOC) the Troops in the Straits Settlements on 6 May 1914, succeeding Major General Theodore Stephenson.

Poor health prevented his active service in the First World War, which began in August, but he served as general officer commanding (GOC) of the 59th (2nd North Midland) Division, a Territorial Force (TF) formation. He commanded it from November 1915 until February 1916, and the 68th (2nd Welsh) Division, another TF formation, for most of 1916 while the formation was under training in the British Isles. He was the British representative on the inter-allied military mission to Greece in 1918, for which he was appointed a Commander of the Royal Order of George I and awarded the Medal of Military Merit, 1st Class from Greece.

He retired from the army in March 1920. He was colonel of his old regiment, the KSLI, from January 1921 until February 1931, taking over from Lieutenant General Sir Charles Edmond Knox.

== Family ==
Reade married Rose Frances Spencer, daughter of Colonel Almeric George Spencer and Alice Isabel Fraser, on 9 June 1894.

== Sources ==
- Becke, Archibald F. (1937). Order of Battle of Divisions Part 2B. The 2nd-Line Territorial Force Divisions (57th–69th) with The Home-Service Divisions (71st–73rd) and 74th and 75th Divisions. London: HMSO. OCLC 4405016.

Academic offices
Preceded by Edward Thornton Taylor	Commandant of the Royal Military College of Canada; 1905–1909	Succeeded by Gerald Kitson
Military offices
Preceded by Theodore Stephenson	GOC Troops in the Straits Settlements; 1914–1915	Succeeded by Sir Dudley Ridout
Preceded by Henry MacCall	GOC 59th (2nd North Midland) Division; 1915–1916	Succeeded by Arthur Sandbach
Preceded by Arthur Sandbach	GOC 68th (2nd Welsh) Division; 1916–1917	Succeeded by Edward Perceval
Honorary titles
Preceded by Charles Edmond Knox	Colonel of the King's Shropshire Light Infantry; 1921–1931	Succeeded by Sir Charles Grant
