= Re Londonderry's Settlement =

English trusts law case

- Court: Court of Appeal
- Citation: [1965] Ch 918

Keywords
- Fiduciary duties, information

Re Londonderry's Settlement [1965] Ch 918 is an English trusts law case concerning the duty of trustees to provide information to beneficiaries. It has been heavily criticised and possibly doubted by Schmidt v Rosewood Trust Ltd.

== Facts ==
A beneficiary did not like the small sums proposed to be distributed to her. She wanted information about the reasons for the decision.

== Judgment ==
The Court of Appeal held that there was no need for disclosure of reasons, because it could cause family strife, fruitless litigation or make the trustees’ role impossible.

== See also ==
- Schmidt v Rosewood Trust Ltd [2003] UKPC 26
- Hartigan Nominees v Rydge (1992) 29 NSWLR 405, Kirby P said it would not be unduly burdensome for professional trustees to provide reasoned decisions and that would be likely to cause less strife than no reasons at all.
- Hawkesley v May [1955] 3 WLR 569, obligation to inform beneficiaries of their status as beneficiaries when they turn 18.
- Re Manisty’s Settlement [1971] Ch 17, no necessary duty to inform objects of a power of their status, only the primary objects, who are identifiable only as a question of fact
- Murphy v Murphy [1999] 1 WLR 283, a settlor had to provide information to a discretionary beneficiary. A more remote beneficiary may not have gained disclosure.
