= Dudley Ridout =

British soldier

Major-General Sir Dudley Ridout KBE CB CMG
- Portrait by Walter Stoneman, 1921
- Born: Dudley Howard Ridout; 15 January 1866; Calcutta, British India
- Died: 3 May 1941 (aged 75); Richmond upon Thames, Surrey, England
- Burial place: Richmond Cemetery
- Military career
- Allegiance: United Kingdom
- Branch: British Army
- Rank: Major-General
- Unit: Royal Engineers
- Awards: Knight Commander of the Order of the British Empire; Companion of the Order of the Bath, Companion of the Order of St Michael and St George

Major-General Sir Dudley Howard Ridout, KBE, CB, CMG (15 January 1866 – 3 May 1941) was a British soldier of the Royal Engineers.

== Background ==
He was born in Calcutta, British India to Major Joseph Bramley Ridout and Wilmot Beresford Hayter. His father was a British soldier who served on the Bhutan expedition with the 80th Regiment 1864–5. His father had been on the staff of the Hythe School of Musketry and was the captain of cadets at the Royal Military College of Canada in Kingston, Ontario Canada. His grandfather Thomas Gibbs Ridout was deputy assistant commissary general during the War of 1812 and a cashier of the Bank of Canada from 1822 to 1861.

== Education and career ==
Dudley Ridout graduated at the Royal Military College of Canada in Kingston, Ontario and was commissioned into the Royal Engineers as a lieutenant on 30 June 1885. He was promoted captain on 1 October 1894. He served on the staff as an intelligence officer in South Africa during the Second Boer War from 1900 to 1902, after which he was appointed in command of the 46th (Field) company stationed in South Africa and promoted to major on 2 November 1902.

He served in World War I and was transferred to Singapore Command where from 1915 to 1921 he was General Officer Commanding the Troops in the Straits Settlements and a member of the Executive and Legislative Councils there. He retired in 1924.

He died in 1941 in the London borough of Richmond upon Thames and was buried in Richmond Cemetery, Section 8, grave number 9479.

== Legacy ==
Ridout Row, the row of two terraces of eight small four roomed cottages with an outdoor courtyard on the ground of RMC, was named in honour of Dudley Howard Ridout's father, Captain Joseph Bramley Ridout. The Ridout Row was renovated and currently houses the Canadian Defence Academy headquarters.

== Personal life ==
In 1904, Ridout married Maude Elizabeth Hutton, daughter of Charles Henry Hutton. They had a son, Colonel Dudley Gethin Bramley Ridout CBE (born 1906), who commanded 1/6 South Staffordshires in Normandy 1944, and a daughter, Estelle Wilmot Hutton (born 1911).

Military offices
Preceded by Raymond Reade	GOC Troops in the Straits Settlements; 1915–1921	Succeeded by Sir Neill Malcolm
