= Alfred Izydor Romer =

Polish-Lithuanian painter, sculptor, printmaker, and medallist

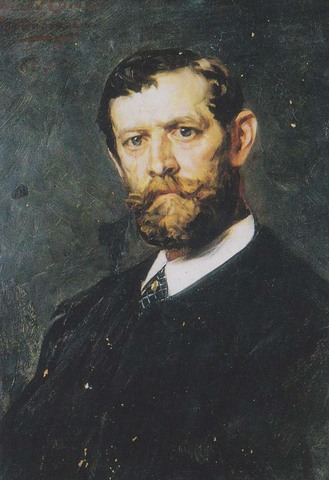
Alfred Isidore Romer. Portrait by Stanisław Jakub Rostworowski

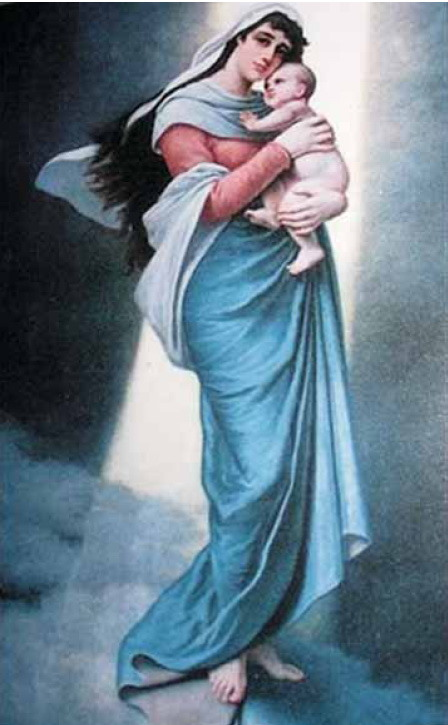
The Madonna of Pinsk (1894)

Alfred Izydor Romer (Römer or Roemer, Belarusian: Альфрэд Ізідор Ромер; 16 May 1832 – 24 January 1897) was a Polish-Lithuanian painter, sculptor, printmaker and medallist from the family of Baltic-German origins, who worked in what is now Lithuania and Belarus.

== Biography ==
Born in Vilnius, he was descended from a noble family that had settled in Courland in the 16th-Century. His father was Edward Jan Römer, a painter, writer and social activist. His grandfather was Michał Józef Römer, a politician who favored the abolition of serfdom. His brother, Edward Mateusz Römer was also a well-known painter. His mother was Anna Białłozor, daughter of Józef Montwid Białłozor.

He studied drawing with Kanuty Rusiecki in Vilnius. In 1850 he went to Vologda, where his father was exiled in 1839. They both together with father's second wife Zofia Białłozor returned to Vilnius in 1852. Alfred Izydor opened a painting academy. In 1857 he traveled together with Jan Zienkiewicz in Europe, visiting Dresden, Paris, Belgium and Italy. In 1859 he returned home and settled in Krewno estate in Ukmergė County. He also contributed prints and drawings of rural life to a Polish illustrated magazine called Kłosy (Ears of Wheat).

In 1863 he was arrested and imprisoned at Dinaburg Fortress for organising the uprising in Lithuania. After his release in 1865, he sold his estate and lived with father.

In 1867 he went abroad again visiting a number of countries - Bohemia, Switzerland, Germany. He spent a longer time in Paris, where he studied under Leon Bonnat and Antoni Oleszczyński. On 16 April 1871 he went to Bayeurx, then to Munich, where he enrolled at the Academy of Fine Arts, Munich, continuing his studies with Anton Seitz and Arthur von Ramberg. He also made a study trip to Italy with fellow student Albert von Keller, painting portraits of local aristocrats and copying Veronese. This was followed by a series of exhibitions in Munich, Paris and Kraków.

In 1874 he moved to an estate near Karolinowo, Pastavy Raion, that was owned by his new wife, countess Wanda Sulistrowska (1853–1944). These were among his most productive years, as he not only painted, but engaged in ethnographic studies. He wrote a monograph on the history and manufacture of a garment known as the "Slutsk Sash" and a history of the "Vilnius Academy of Fine Arts". He also wrote a monograph on the history of his own family (published in Przemyśl in 1880). Romer collected old documents and manuscripts, which he send to Polish museums Kraków and Lviv.

He moved to Kraków in 1884, and lived there for nice years while serving on the Art Commission of the Polish Academy of Learning. He was also a member of the committee and from 1890 to 1891 a member of the directorate of the Kraków Society of Friends of Fine Arts. In addition to his portraits and drawings, he created religious works at several churches; most notably the "Madonna of Pinsk".

He returned to his wife's estate in 1894 and died there in 1897. In 1895 he stayed briefly with his family in Italy. Wanda Sulistrowska, in her later years, became a spiritual advisor and ascetic. Plans are underway to restore the estate, which has fallen into disrepair, and create a monument. His only daughter was Helena Romer-Ochenkowska.

== Sources ==
- Kamolowa, Danuta; Więcek, Adam (1988–1989). "Alfred Izydor Romer". Polski Słownik Biograficzny (in Polish). Vol. 31. Wrocław. pp. 630–632.
- I. Dravnitsky, "Мастакі з дынастыі Ромераў, Жыццё і творчасць, родзічы і сябры" (Artists of the Romer Dynasty: Life, Work, Family and Friends), Паставы 2013. — 60 с.
- A. Vysotsky, "Introduction to Alfred Romer" in Нарачаснская зара, №115-117., 13 September 2003.
