= Justice Peterson =

Justice Peterson may refer to:

- C. Donald Peterson (1918–1987), associate justice of the Minnesota Supreme Court
- Edwin J. Peterson (born 1930), chief justice of the Oregon Supreme Court
- Henry K. Peterson (1884–1966), associate justice of the Iowa Supreme Court

== See also ==
- Judge Peterson (disambiguation)
