= Mark Romer, Baron Romer =

British barrister and judge (1866-1944)

The Right Honourable The Lord Romer PC
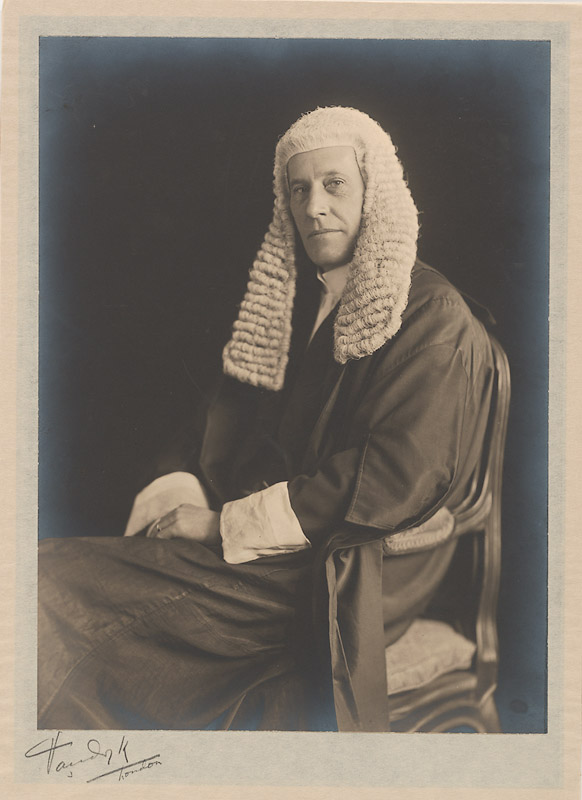

Lord of Appeal in Ordinary
- In office 1938–1944
- Preceded by: The Lord Roche
- Succeeded by: The Lord Simonds

Lord Justice of Appeal
- In office 19 November 1929 – 5 January 1938
- Preceded by: Sir Frank Russell
- Succeeded by: Sir Albert Clauson

Justice of the High Court
- In office 1922–1929
- Preceded by: Sir Arthur Peterson

Personal details
- Born: 9 August 1866 Crawley, Sussex, England
- Died: 19 August 1944 (aged 78)
- Spouse: Anne Wilmot Ritchie
- Parent: Sir Robert Romer (father)
- Relatives: Mark Lemon (maternal grandfather); Charles Romer (son); Cecil Romer (brother); Charles Thomson Ritchie (father-in-law)
- Education: Rugby School
- Alma mater: Trinity Hall, Cambridge

Mark Lemon Romer, Baron Romer, PC (9 August 1866 – 19 August 1944) was a British barrister and judge.

== Biography ==
Romer was born in Crawley, Sussex, the second son of Sir Robert Romer, later a Lord Justice of Appeal, and Betty, née Lemon, daughter of Mark Lemon, founding editor of Punch. He was educated at Rugby and Trinity Hall, Cambridge, where he read Mathematics, graduating as a junior optime. He was called to the bar by Lincoln's Inn in 1890. Practicing at the Chancery bar, he was made a King's Counsel in 1906 and attached himself to the court of Mr Justice Parker, then that of Mr Justice Sargant when Parker was elevated to the House of Lords.

Romer was appointed a judge of the Chancery Division of the High Court in 1922, in succession to Sir Arthur Frederick Peterson, and received the customary knighthood the same year. In 1929, he was made a Lord Justice of Appeal and sworn of the Privy Council. On 5 January 1938, he was appointed a Lord of Appeal in Ordinary in succession to Lord Roche and was made a life peer with the title Baron Romer, of New Romney in the County of Kent. He resigned as Lord of Appeal in April 1944, and died four months later. His son, Sir Charles Romer, was appointed to the Chancery Division two months after his death, following in the steps of both his father and grandfather.

Both Lord Romer's father, Sir Robert Romer (1840-1918), and his son, Sir Charles Romer (1897-1969), were also judges, serving as Lords Justices of Appeal in 1899-1906 and 1951-1960 respectively. All three had served in the Chancery Division of the High Court.

He married Anne Wilmot Ritchie, daughter of Charles Thomson Ritchie.

== List of cases ==
- Re Gardner (No.2) [1923] 2 Ch 230
- Re City Equitable Fire Insurance Co [1925] Ch 407
- France v James Coombes & Co [1928] 2 KB 81
- Cotter v National Union of Seamen [1929] 2 Ch 58
- Kirby v Wilkins [1929] Ch 444
- Re Thompson [1934] Ch 342
- Knightsbridge Estates Trust Ltd v Byrne [1940] AC 613
- Southern Foundries (1926) Ltd v Shirlaw [1940] AC 701
- Nokes v Doncaster Amalgamated Collieries Ltd [1940] AC 1014
