= Kirby v Wilkins =

- Court: High Court
- Citation: [1929] Ch 444

Keywords
- Indirect investor, trusts, nominee

Kirby v Wilkins [1929] Ch 444 is a UK company law and English trusts law case involving the duties owed by a nominee of shares to the beneficiary. It determines that a beneficiary, if absolutely entitled, can instruct a bare nominee how to deal with the shares. Pending any instructions about voting from the beneficial owner, the registered holder can vote shares in the beneficiary's interest.

== Facts ==
Mr Kirby was one of four people which sold a business to Derby Paper Staining Ltd. Unfortunately, the price was miscalculated and the company overpaid. It had paid by giving £16,000 worth of its shares to the four. The four decided, voluntarily and not because of any right of the company arising from misrepresentations, to give the company back £3,000 worth of shares. But then Mr Kirby argued, against the chairman, Mr Wilkins, that the shares were held on trust for the individual shareholders, and so he could not vote at any meeting on the shares. Mr Wilkins argued that the shares would be held on trust for the company.

== Judgment ==
Romer J first decided that the transfer did not violate the principle of a company purchasing its own shares. In the course of his judgment he said the following.

It is then said, however, that in any case the defendant ought not to have exercised his voting power in respect of the shares without the direction of the company. I do not think that that contention is sound. Where a shareholder holds shares as a bare trustee for a third person, he is no doubt obliged to exercise his voting power in the way that the cestui que trust desires, but unless and until the cestui que trust has indicated his wish as to the way in which the voting power should be exercised, there is no reason why the nominee should not exercise the voting power vested in him as a trustee. He holds that voting power upon trust, but, unless and until the cestui que trust intervenes, he must exercise it according to his discretion in the best interests of his cestui que trust. Now here I do not know that the company ever actually intervened, either through its board of directors, or by means of the general meeting of its shareholders in the sense of giving any direction to Mr. Wilkins as to how he should vote in respect of these shares, and that being so, unless and until he received any such direction, he was in my opinion justified in voting in respect of them as his conscience dictated in the interests of the company.

== See also ==
- Vandervell v IRC [1967] 2 AC 291, beneficial owner directs the dealings by a registered owner to transfer shares
- Butt v Kelson [1952] Ch 197
- Nestle v National Westminster Bank plc [1994] 1 All ER 118, 135, trustees manage impartially, with independent judgment for all beneficiaries’ benefit
