= Charles Romer =

British judge (1897–1969)

The Right Honourable Sir Charles Romer OBE

Lord Justice of Appeal
- In office 1951–1960

Justice of the High Court
- In office 1944–1951
- Preceded by: Sir Fergus Morton

Personal details
- Born: Charles Robert Ritchie Romer; 19 January 1891
- Died: 15 February 1969 (aged 78)
- Parent: Mark Romer (father)
- Relatives: Robert Romer (grandfather); Cecil Romer (uncle); Frederic Maugham (uncle)
- Education: Rugby School
- Military career
- Allegiance: United Kingdom
- Branch: British Army
- Rank: Captain
- Unit: King's Royal Rifle Corps
- Conflicts: World War I

Sir Charles Robert Ritchie Romer, OBE, PC (19 January 1897 – 15 February 1969) was a British judge who served as Lord Justice of Appeal between 1951 and 1960.

== Life and career ==
Romer was born into a judicial family: he was the son of Mark Romer, Baron Romer, a Lord of Appeal in Ordinary and the grandson of Sir Robert Romer, a Lord Justice of Appeal. He was the nephew of Sir Cecil Romer and was also related to Frederic Maugham, 1st Viscount Maugham, the Lord Chancellor, and Frank Russell, Baron Russell of Killowen, a Lord Justice of Appeal.

Romer was educated at the Rugby School, and served in the King's Royal Rifle Corps during World War I, achieving the rank of Captain. He was wounded in action and twice mentioned in dispatches, and was appointed an OBE.

He was called to the bar by Lincoln's Inn in 1921 and practised at the Chancery bar, frequently appearing in front of the House of Lords and the Judicial Committee of the Privy Council. He was made a King's Counsel in 1937.

He was appointed as judge of the Chancery Division of the High Court of Justice in 1944, receiving the customary knighthood. In 1951 he was promoted to the Court of Appeal, becoming a Lord Justice of Appeal, and was sworn of the Privy Council. He resigned from the bench in 1960. In retirement, he headed a committee appointed to inquire into security breaches related to the Portland spy ring.

== Judgments ==
Judicial decisions of Romer included:

- Frankfurther v W.L. Exner Ltd [1947] Ch 629 - on recognition of Nazi era decrees expropriating Jewish property.

== Arms ==
Coat of arms of Charles Romer

Motto
Agere Aut Pati Fortiter Romanum Es
