= Schmidt v Rosewood Trust Ltd =

2003 Judicial Committee of the Privy Council case

- Court: Judicial Committee of the Privy Council
- Citations: [2003] UKPC 26 [2003] 2 AC 709

Case history
- Prior action: Staff of Government Division of the High Court of Justice of the Isle of Man

Court membership
- Judges sitting: Lord Nicholls of Birkenhead; Lord Hope of Craighead; Lord Hutton; Lord Hobhouse of Woodborough; Lord Walker of Gestingthorpe

Case opinions
- Lord Walker of Gestingthorpe

Keywords
- Secret trusts, information

Schmidt v Rosewood Trust Ltd [2003] UKPC 26 is a judicial decision concerning the information rights of a beneficiary under a discretionary trust. Although the judgment involved a question as to the law of the Isle of Man (rather than English law, strictly speaking), the Privy Council's judgment in Schmidt v Rosewood was adopted into English law by Briggs J (as his Lordship then was) in Breakspear v Ackland [2008] EWHC 220 (Ch).

== Facts ==
Mr Vadim Schmidt sought disclosure of accounts and information in relation to two trusts set up by his father, who had died intestate. Rosewood Trustee Ltd was the trustee of the two relevant trusts, having assumed that office from Lorne House Trust Ltd (the original trustee). Mr Schmidt had a discretionary interest under the settlement and sought disclosure in his capacity as a beneficiary as well as in his capacity as the administrator of his father's estate.

The defendant trustee argued that Schmidt was not entitled to disclosure of the trust documents because he did not have a proprietary interest under the trust (being only "a mere object of a power"). Nor, the defendant trustee argued, had the father been the settlor under the trust, which had been executed by Pacquerette Ltd as settlor (the nominee of Mr Schmidt).

== Advice ==
The Privy Council rejected the previous proprietary explanation of a beneficiary's right to disclosure that had been set out in Re Londonderry's Settlement [1965] Ch 918 per Salmon LJ. Rather, Lord Walker (giving the advice of the Privy Council) held that: "the Board cannot regard it as a reasoned or binding decision that a beneficiary's right of claim to disclosure of trust documents or information must always have the proprietary basis of a transmissible interest in trust property." (at [50]) Lord Walker went further, writing that a proprietary interest under a trust "is neither sufficient nor necessary" (at [54]). Disclosure to a beneficiary having a proprietary interest has thus become a matter of discretion, although the nature of the interest is relevant to the court's consideration of whether to exercise its discretion.

Lord Walker made the following clear.

51. Their Lordships consider that the more principled and correct approach is to regard the right to seek disclosure of trust documents as one aspect of the court's inherent jurisdiction to supervise, and if necessary to intervene in, the administration of trusts. The right to seek the court's intervention does not depend on entitlement to a fixed and transmissible beneficial interest. The object of a discretion (including a mere power) may also be entitled to protection from a court of equity, although the circumstances in which he may seek protection, and the nature of the protection he may expect to obtain, will depend on the court's discretion: see Lord Wilberforce in Gartside v Inland Revenue Commissioners [1968] AC 553, 617-8 and in McPhail v Doulton [1971] AC 424, 456-7; Templeman J in In re Manisty's Settlement [1974] Ch 17, 27-8; and Warner J in Mettoy Pension Trustees Ltd v Evans [1990] 1 WLR 1587, 1617-8. Mr Brownbill's submission to the contrary effect tends to prove too much, since he would regard the object of a discretionary trust as having a proprietary interest even though it is not transmissible (except in the special case of collective action taken unanimously by all the members of a closed class).

52. Their Lordships are therefore in general agreement with the approach adopted in the judgments of Kirby P and Sheller JA in the Court of Appeal of New South Wales in Hartigan Nominees Pty Ltd v Rydge (1992) 29 NSWLR 405. That was a case concerned with disclosure of a memorandum of wishes addressed to the trustees by Sir Norman Rydge (who was in substance, but not nominally, the settlor). Kirby P said at pp 421-2:

"I do not consider that it is imperative to determine whether that document is a 'trust document' (as I think it is) or whether the respondent, as a beneficiary, has a proprietary interest in it (as I am also inclined to think he does). Much of the law on the subject of access to documents has conventionally been expressed in terms of the 'proprietary interest' in the document of the party seeking access to it. Thus, it has been held that a cestui que trust has a 'proprietary right' to seek all documents relating to the trust: see O'Rourke v Darbishire (at 601, 603). This approach is unsatisfactory. Access should not be limited to documents in which a proprietary right may be established. Such rights may be sufficient; but they are not necessary to a right of access which the courts will enforce to uphold the cestui que trust's entitlement to a reasonable assurance of the manifest integrity of the administration of the trust by the trustees. I agree with Professor H A J Ford's comment, in his book (with Mr W A Lee) Principles of the Law of Trusts, 2nd ed (1990) Sydney, Law Book Co, at 425, that the equation of rights of inspection of trust documents with the beneficiaries' equitable rights of property in the trust assets 'gives rise to far more problems than it solves' (at 425):

'... The legal title and rights to possession are in the trustees: all the beneficiary has are equitable rights against the trustees. ... The beneficiary's rights to inspect trust documents are founded therefore not upon any equitable proprietary right which he or she may have in respect of those documents but upon the trustee's fiduciary duty to keep the beneficiary informed and to render accounts. It is the extent of that duty that is in issue. The equation of the right to inspect trust documents with the beneficiary's equitable proprietary rights gives rise to unnecessary and undesirable consequences. It results in the drawing of virtually incomprehensible distinctions between documents which are trust documents and those which are not; it casts doubts upon the rights of beneficiaries who cannot claim to have an equitable proprietary interest in the trust assets, such as the beneficiaries of discretionary trusts; and it may give trustees too great a degree of protection in the case of documents, artificially classified as not being trust documents, and beneficiaries too great a right to inspect the activities of trustees in the case of documents which are, equally artificially, classified as trust documents.'"

== See also ==
- Re Londonderry's Settlement [1965] Ch 918
