= Robert Romer =

British judge (1840–1918)

The Right Honourable Sir Robert Romer GCB, FRS
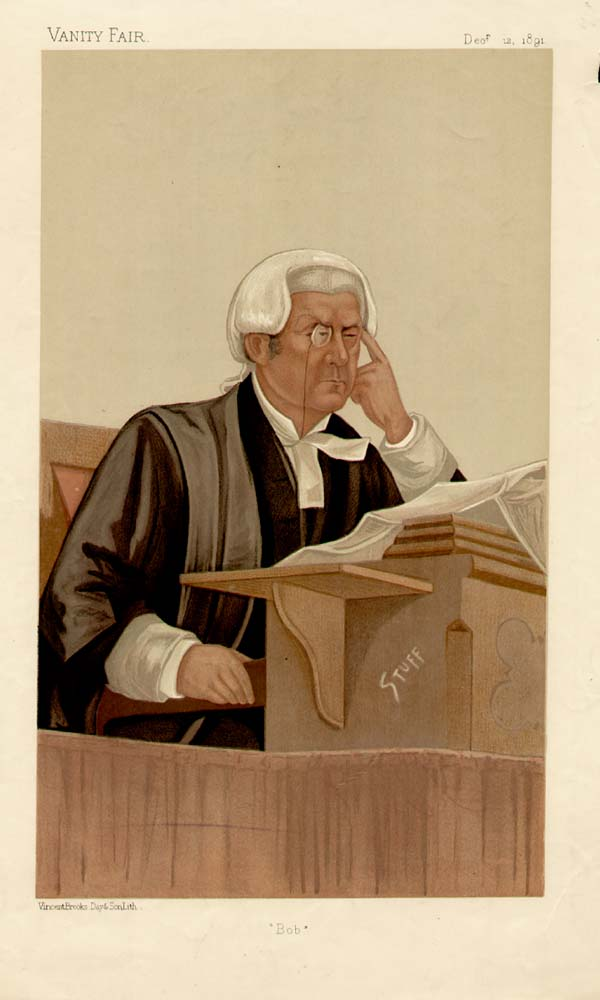
- "Bob", Vanity Fair caricature, 1891

Lord Justice of Appeal
- In office 27 February 1899 – 24 October 1906

Justice of the High Court
- In office 17 November 1890 – 27 February 1899

Personal details
- Born: 23 December 1840 Kilburn, Middlesex, England
- Died: 19 March 1918 (aged 77)
- Spouse: Betty Lemon (m. 1864)
- Children: 3
- Relatives: Mark Romer (son); Cecil Romer (son); Charles Romer (grandson)
- Education: St John's School, Leatherhead
- Alma mater: Trinity Hall, Cambridge

Sir Robert Romer GCB PC FRS (23 December 1840 – 19 March 1918) was a British judge. He was a High Court judge (1890–1899), and a Lord Justice of Appeal (1899–1906) when he was known as Lord Justice Romer.

== Biography ==
Romer was born in Kilburn, Middlesex. He attended St John's School, Leatherhead (in Surrey) and excelled at mathematics at Trinity Hall, Cambridge where he was Senior Wrangler in 1863 (the first from Trinity Hall) and was joint winner of Smith's Prize in that year. Following the premature late 1864 death of George Boole, the first professor of maths at Queen's College, Cork, Romer beat out Robert Ball for the vacant position, however he only stayed in Cork from 1865 to 1866. He became QC in 1881, and a bencher of Lincoln's Inn in 1884. The same year he unsuccessfully stood as the Liberal candidate in Brighton.

In 1890 he was appointed High Court judge and assigned to the Chancery Division, receiving the customary knighthood. He served as such until 1899, when he was appointed a Lord Justice of Appeal, in succession to Chitty. He resigned in 1906. It was said that his resignation had been caused by the conduct of his fellow Lord Justice Sir Roland Vaughan Williams.

Romer was sworn a Privy Councillor in 1899, and elected a Fellow of the Royal Society in the same year. He was appointed Knight Grand Cross of the Order of the Bath (GCB) in the New Year Honours list 1 January 1901, and was invested by King Edward VII in February the same year.

He was a member of the Royal Commission on South African Hospitals in 1901, during the Boer War. He was a member of the Royal Commission on University Education in London in 1909.

== Family ==
In 1864 he married his first cousin Betty Lemon, daughter of his aunt Helen (Nelly) Romer and Mark Lemon, editor of Punch. Their sons were Mark Romer, Baron Romer and Sir Cecil Romer. His grandson Sir Charles Robert Romer was also Lord Justice of Appeal. Their daughter Helen Mary married future Lord Chancellor Frederic Maugham.

== Arms ==
Coat of arms of Robert Romer

Crest
Out of a ducal coronet Or a demi man in armour as in the arms.
Escutcheon
Or on a base Vert a man in armour visor raised on the helmet proper a plume Gules Argent and Azure holding in the dexter gauntlet a halbert proper about the waist a sword belt Gules pendant therefrom a sword hilted Or the scabbard Gules garnished Or a crescent in dexter chief for difference Azure.
Motto
AGERE AUT PATI FORTITER ROMANUM EST (To do or be strongly is Roman).
