= Cecil Romer =

British Army general

General Sir Cecil Romer GCB KBE CMG
- Born: 14 November 1869; Kensington, London
- Died: 1 October 1962 (aged 92); Maidstone, Kent
- Military career
- Allegiance: United Kingdom
- Branch: British Army
- Service years: 1890–1935
- Rank: General
- Commands: Southern Command; Western Command; 1st Division; 59th (2nd North Midland) Division
- Conflicts: Second Boer War; First World War
- Awards: Knight Grand Cross of the Order of the Bath; Knight Commander of the Order of the British Empire; Companion of the Order of St Michael and St George; Mentioned in Despatches; Legion of Honour (France)

General Sir Cecil Francis Romer, GCB, KBE, CMG (14 November 1869 – 1 October 1962) was a British Army general who reached high command during the 1920s.

== Early life and education ==
Romer was born in Kensington, London, the son of Lord Justice Robert Romer and Betty Lemon, daughter of Mark Lemon, editor of Punch. His elder brother was Mark Romer, Baron Romer. He was educated at Eton College. His sister, Helen Mary, married Lord Chancellor Frederic Maugham, 1st Viscount Maugham.

== Military career ==
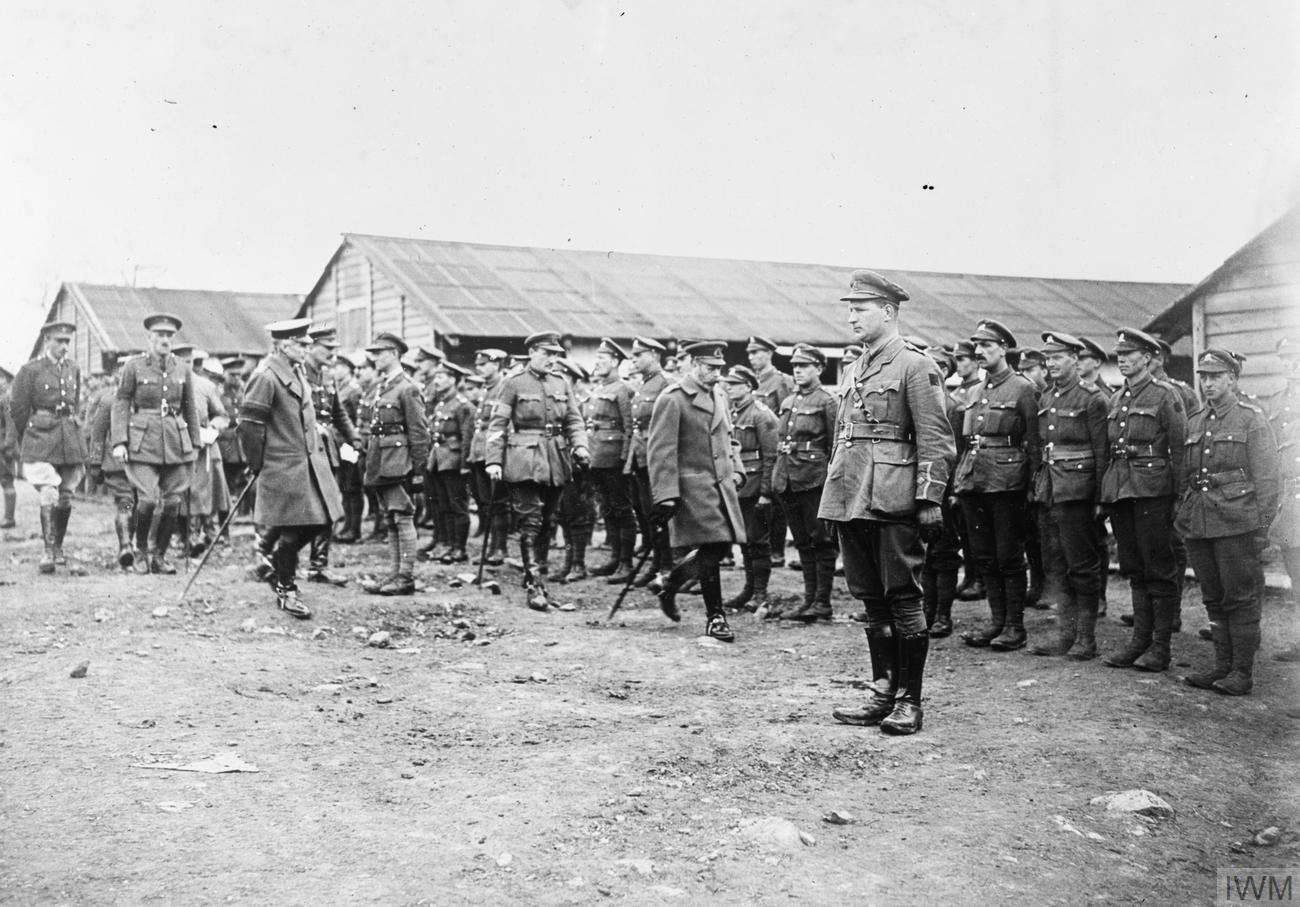
King George V and General Sir Henry Horne inspecting men of the 2/6th Battalion, South Staffordshire Regiment, 59th Division, at Gauchin, 30 March 1918. They are accompanied by Brigadier General T. G. Cope and Major General Cecil Romer, GOC 59th Division.

Romer was commissioned into the Royal Dublin Fusiliers as a second lieutenant on 1 March 1890, promoted lieutenant on 23 August 1893, and captain on 19 October 1898. He served in the Second Boer War between 1899 and 1902, was wounded in early 1900, and received the brevet rank of major on 29 November 1900. Following the war he was seconded as an adjutant of volunteers in February 1902, but only a few months later he was on 19 June 1902 appointed brigade major to the 13th Brigade, in Dublin. He went on to become a General Staff Officer in 1904. On 1 April 1908 he was appointed as a GSO2 of a Territorial Force (TF) unit.

On 7 June 1910 he was promoted to major.

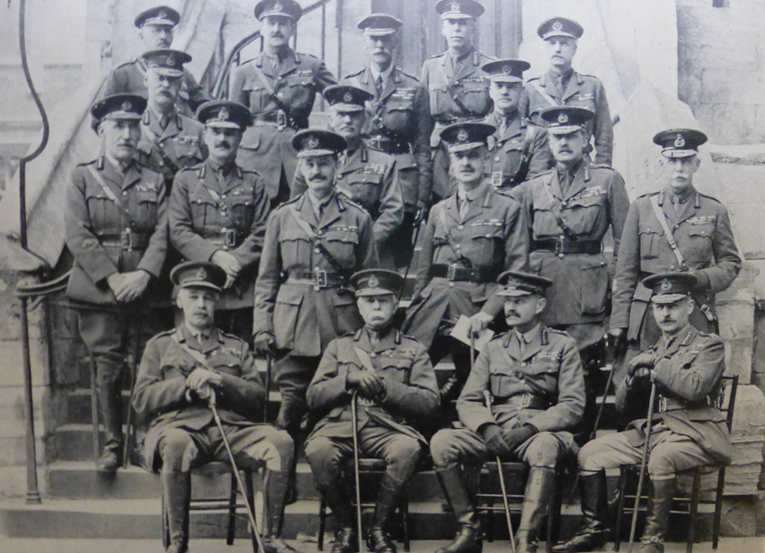
Eighteen Old Etonian generals revisit Eton, May 1919. Major General Romer is stood in the middle row, third from the left.

During the First World War, Romer, promoted to temporary colonel in November 1914, fought on the Western Front. In February 1915 he was appointed a Companion of the Order of the Bath (CB). In July he was promoted to temporary brigadier general and succeeded Major General Arthur Lynden-Bell as brigadier general, general staff of III Corps. In January 1916 he was advanced to brevet colonel and made an aide-de-camp (extra) to King George V. He was appointed a Companion of the Order of St Michael and St George (CMG) in the 1917 New Year Honours. Promoted in April 1917 to temporary major general, he was general officer commanding (GOC) of the 59th (2nd North Midland) Division between then and 1918.

Romer, promoted in January 1919 to substantive major general, became GOC 1st Division at Aldershot in 1926. He was then elevated to General Officer Commanding-in-Chief Western Command in 1928 and to General Officer Commanding-in-Chief Southern Command in March 1931. In 1933, he was appointed Adjutant-General to the Forces: he relinquished this appointment and retired from the army in March 1935.

Romer was appointed a Knight Commander of the Order of the British Empire (KBE) in the 1925 Birthday Honours, promoted to Knight Commander of the Order of the Bath (KCB) in 1929, and again to Knight Grand Cross of that Order (GCB) in the 1935 New Year Honours.

Military offices
Preceded by Arthur Sandbach	GOC 59th (2nd North Midland) Division; 1917–1918	Succeeded by Robert Whigham
Preceded by Archibald Montgomery	GOC 1st Division; 1926–1928	Succeeded by John Duncan
Preceded by Sir Richard Butler	GOC-in-C Western Command; 1928–1931	Succeeded by Sir Cyril Deverell
Preceded by Sir Archibald Montgomery-Massingberd	GOC-in-C Southern Command; 1931–1933	Succeeded by Sir Percy Radcliffe
Preceded by Sir Archibald Montgomery-Massingberd	Adjutant General; 1933–1935	Succeeded by Sir Harry Knox
