= Arthur Frederick Peterson =

Sir Arthur Peterson
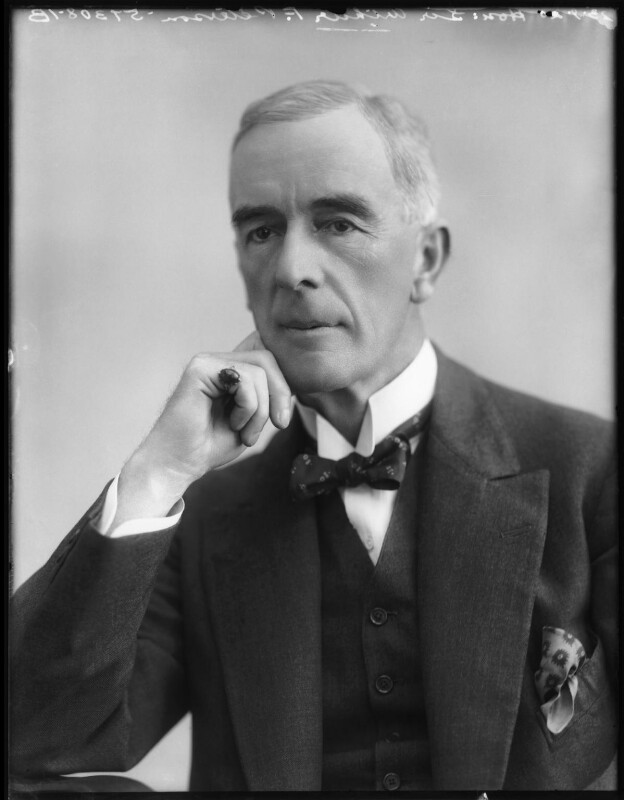
- Peterson in 1920

Justice of the High Court
- In office 1915–1922
- Preceded by: Sir Matthew Joyce
- Succeeded by: Sir Mark Romer

Personal details
- Born: Arthur Frederick Peterson
- Education: Dulwich College; Corpus Christi College, Oxford

Sir Arthur Frederick Peterson (12 October 1859 – 12 May 1922) was a leading barrister and an English High Court judge in the Chancery Division from 1915 until his death in 1922.

He was born in Melbourne, Colony of Victoria, the son of William Peterson of Melby, Shetland Islands, a station owner in Victoria, Riverina and Queensland and principal of the well known Flinders Street firm. He was a cousin of Sir William Peterson, principal of McGill University.

Arthur was sent to England at the age of twelve for his education and attended Dulwich College. He went on to study at Corpus Christi College, Oxford. He had a distinguished scholastic career and later entered Lincoln's Inn. On 22 November 1915 he was created a judge of the Chancery Division having not long previously been created a King's Counsel. During the First World War he was special constable detailed for duty at Buckingham Palace. He was unmarried.
