= Edward Mateusz Römer =

Baltic-German painter

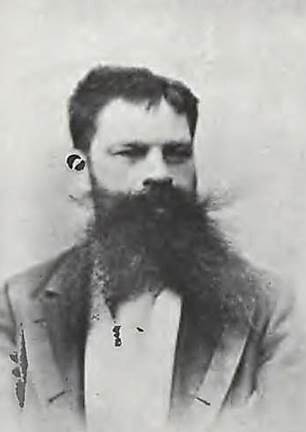
Edward Mateusz Römer (1870s?)

Edward Mateusz Jan Oktawiusz Römer (Belarusian: Эдвард Матэй Ромер; 19 September 1848, Vologda - 10 February 1900, Lunna) was a Baltic-German painter who lived and worked in the Russian Empire. His brother was the sculptor and painter, Alfred Izydor Römer and his father was Edward Jan Römer, a noted writer and social activist.

== Biography ==
He was born in Vologda, where his father had been exiled for supporting the radical politician, Szymon Konarski. In 1852, they returned home, to Vilnius, and he began his art studies; first with his father (who was an amateur painter), then with Kanuty Rusiecki.

After finishing his public school education in 1867, he enrolled at the Dresden Academy of Fine Arts, then transferred to the Academy of Fine Arts, Munich in 1870, where he studied with Hermann Anschütz and Arthur von Ramberg. Some of his drawings appeared in the Illustrirte Zeitung.

In 1873, he had a showing at an exhibit held by the Kraków Society of Friends of Fine Arts and later won a silver medal at an exposition in Lwów. Five years later, he opened a studio in Vilnius, which he shared with his brother Alfred.

In 1880, he married into a noble family and, as part of his dowry, became a landowner in the village of Lunna. Despite being relatively isolated, he continued to exhibit widely throughout Northern Europe and France. He died of lingering health issues from a severe case of pneumonia.

== Selected paintings ==
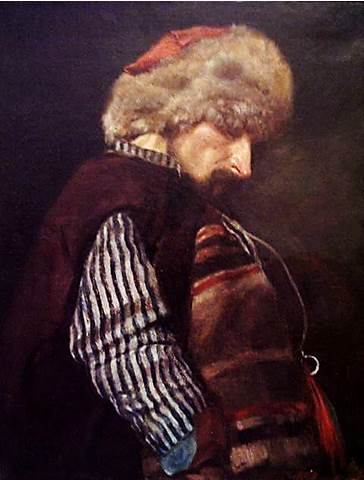
Peasant

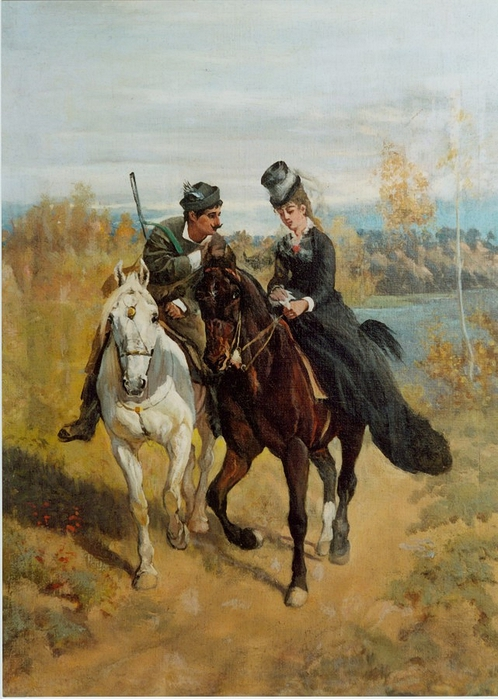
Two Riders

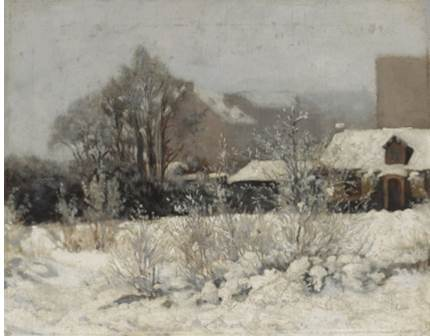
Winter

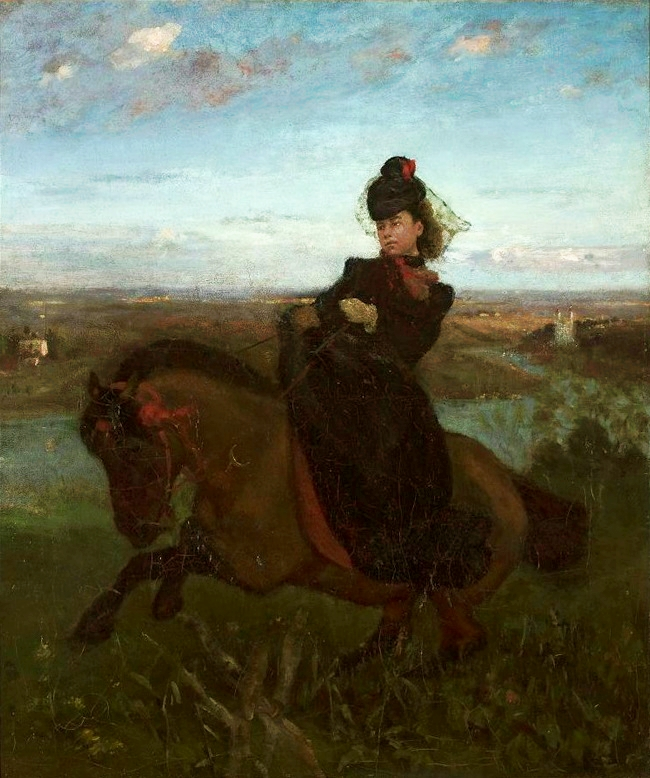
Amazon Woman

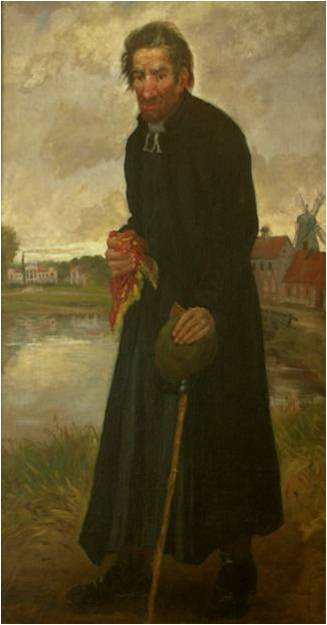
Antanas Strazdas
