= Edward Jan Römer =

Polish writer and painter (1806–1878)

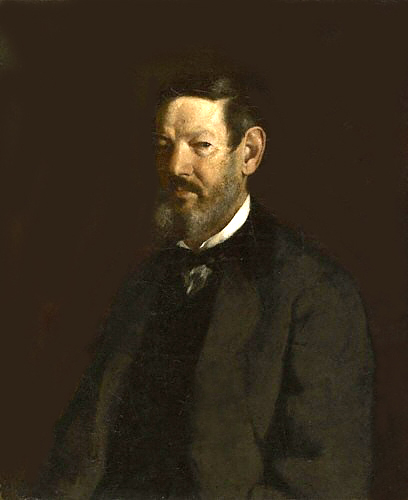
- Portrait of Edward Jan Römer by his son Edward Mateusz Römer
- Born: 14 May 1806; Vilnius, Russian Empire
- Died: 15 May 1878 (aged 72); Vilnius, Russian Empire
- Occupations: Writer, translator, social activist, painter
- Spouses: Anna Monwid-Białozor (1805–1834); Zofia Monwid-Białozor (1817–1893)
- Children: Alfred Izydor Römer, Edward Mateusz Römer
- Parents: Michał Józef Römer (father); Rachela de Reas (mother)

Edward Jan Römer (Belarusian: Эдвард Ян Ромер; Lithuanian: Edvardas Jonas Riomeris; 14 May 1806 – 15 May 1878) was a Polish writer, translator, social activist and painter. He was the father of the artists Alfred Izydor Römer, from his first marriage, to Anna Monwid-Białozor (1805–1834), and Edward Mateusz Römer, from his second marriage, to Anna's sister, Zofia (1817–1893). His father was the politician Michał Józef Römer.

== Biography ==
He was born in Vilnius as the son of Michał Józef Römer and Rachela de Reas. He initially studied painting at Vilnius University with Jan Rustem.

During the November Uprising, he became associated with the Central Insurrection Committee. In 1833, he was imprisoned and sentenced to banishment for life in Vologda, but was given permission to return after only a year. In 1834, he worked with Adam Jerzy Czartoryski, known as the "King" of those in exile, towards the goal of re-establishing the Polish–Lithuanian Commonwealth.

In 1838, he was imprisoned again for his association with the exiled radical, Szymon Konarski, and was sentenced to death. His sentence was commuted to exile in Vologda. This time, he remained until 1852. His son, Edward, was born there. After returning, he was under constant police surveillance.

Later, he became the director of the local branch of the Benevolent Society. He was also a member of the Museum of Antiquities in Vilnius and the Archaeological Commission. During the January Uprising, he was held under house arrest. In his later life, he wrote epigrams and memoirs of famous contemporaries, did translations, and painted portraits of his family. He died in 1878 in Vilnius.

== Sources ==
- Wyprawa do wód z Litwy do Normandii, pages from his journal; collected in 1861. Edited and with an introduction by Danuta Kamolowa. ISBN 83-7009-597-6
