= Michał Józef Römer =

Polish writer and politician (1778–1853)

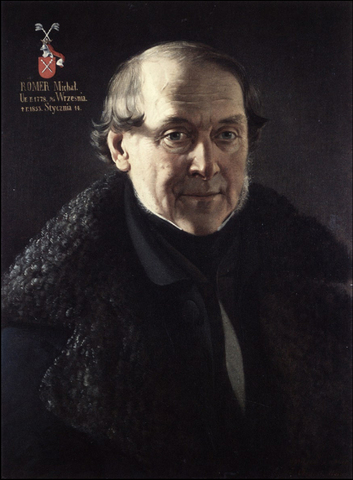
Portrait of Michał Józef Römer by Jan Chrucki (1847)

Michał Józef Römer (also spelled Romer or Roemer; 2 September 1778 – 14 January 1853) was a politician, writer, Freemason, and notable member of the Polish–Lithuanian gentry. He was the son of Stefan Dominik Römer and Anna Pac.

== Biography ==
Römer was born in the Lithuanian city of Vilna, where he spent most of his life. He owned manors in Kriaunos, Antanašė, Bagdoniškis, Daugirdiškiai, Granapolis, and Dembinė. During the French invasion of Russia, he served as the Mayor of Vilnius from July to September 1812. Between 1817 and 1820 he served as a Marshal of the Szlachta for the Vilna Governorate. He also served as a head of the regional branch of the National Patriotic Society and the Towarzystwo Szubrawców literary society (along with Michał Baliński, Leon Borowski, Ignacy Chodźko, Antoni Gorecki, Kazimierz Kontrym, Józef Sękowski, Jędrzej Śniadecki and Tomasz Zan). He was master of Masonic Lodge Diligent Lithuanian (Uolusis lietuvis) and chairman of the Great Lodge Perfect Unity (Tobuloji vienybė).

He was an early advocate for the abolition of serfdom and raised the question in public. For this and his other activities, in 1826 he was imprisoned in Warsaw and the Peter and Paul Fortress in Saint Petersburg. Later he was exiled to Voronezh. After his return in 1832, he retired from public life.

His son Edward Jan Römer was also a noted social activist and writer.

== Family ==
In 1799, he married Rachela de Reas (1783–1855), daughter of Franciszek de Raes, podczasy of Trakai, and Judyta Jeleńska. They had six children:

- Judyta (1800–1803)
- Henryk (1803–1828)
- Filareta Anna (1805–1890), wife of Ksawery Podbereski
- Edward Jan (1806–1878)
- Seweryn Justus (1814–1890)
- Michał Stefan (1816–1846), marshal of the Trakai county
