= 1/1st Montgomeryshire Yeomanry =

1/1st Montgomeryshire Yeomanry 25th (Montgomery and Welsh Horse Yeomanry) Battalion, Royal Welsh Fusiliers
- Active: 10 August 1914 – 29 June 1919
- Country: United Kingdom
- Branch: Territorial Force
- Type: Yeomanry
- Role: Cavalry/Infantry
- Size: Regiment/Battalion
- Part of: South Wales Mounted Brigade; 74th (Yeomanry) Division
- Garrison/HQ: Brook Street drill hall, Welshpool
- Engagements: Second Battle of Gaza; Third Battle of Gaza; Capture of Beersheba; Capture of the Sheria feature Capture of Jerusalem; Defence of Jerusalem; Battle of Tell 'Asur; Hundred Days Offensive; Second Battle of Bapaume; Battle of Épehy; Final advance in Artois and Flanders; Liberation of Tournai

Commanders
- Notable commanders: Lt-Col Lord Kensington, CMG, DSO

The 1/1st Montgomeryshire Yeomanry was an active service unit formed by the Montgomeryshire Yeomanry during World War I. It was sent to garrison Egypt and then amalgamated with another dismounted cavalry unit to form an infantry battalion, the 25th (Montgomery & Welsh Horse Yeomanry) Battalion of the Royal Welch Fusiliers. Serving in the 74th (Yeomanry) Division (the 'Broken Spur Division') it participated in the Sinai and Palestine campaign, including the capture of Beersheba and Jerusalem. Moving with the division to the Western Front it fought in the final campaign, including the desperate Battle of Épehy, until the Armistice. The regiment won two Victoria Crosses during its service. It was disbanded after the war.

== Mobilisation ==
When war was declared on 4 August 1914, the Montgomeryshire Yeomanry of the Territorial Force (TF) mobilised at Brook Street drill hall, Welshpool, with Brevet Colonel Robert Williams-Wynn, DSO, in command. It joined the South Wales Mounted Brigade (SWMB) at Carmarthen and then went with it by train to Hereford.

The part-time TF was intended to be a home defence force in wartime and its members could not be compelled to serve overseas. However, on 10 August 1914 the TF was invited to volunteer for overseas service. In the SWMB the Montgomeryshire and Glamorgan Yeomanry signed up en masse at Hereford, though the Pembroke Yeomanry were less enthusiastic. On 15 August the War Office issued instructions to separate those men who had signed up for Home Service only, and form these into reserve units. On 31 August, the formation of a reserve or 2nd Line unit was authorised for each 1st Line unit where 60 per cent or more of the men had volunteered for Overseas Service. The titles of these 2nd Line units would be the same as the original, but distinguished by a '2/' prefix. In this way duplicate battalions, brigades and divisions were created, mirroring the 1st Line TF formations being sent overseas. Later, the 2nd Line was prepared for overseas service and a 3rd Line was formed to act as a reserve, providing trained replacements for the 1st and 2nd Line regiments.

== 1/1st Montgomeryshire Yeomanry ==
The 1/1st Montgomeryshire Yeomanry moved with the 1/1st SWMB to East Anglia and was stationed in Norfolk, at Thetford by 29 August, moving to Blickling shortly afterwards. The following month the brigade joined the 1st Mounted Division. While training in In East Anglia the division at the same time formed part of the defence forces for the East Coast, and there were numerous false invasion alarms. By September 1915 the 1/1st Montgomeryshire Yeomanry was based at Holt. In October it moved to Cromer. In November the 1/1st SWMB was dismounted.

=== Egypt ===
The 1/1st SWMB embarked at Devonport on 4 March 1916 and sailed to Egypt in company with the 1/1st Welsh Border Mounted Brigade from 1st Mtd Division. They disembarked at Alexandria on 14–15 March and on 20 March the two brigades were merged to form the 4th Dismounted Brigade. At first this was placed in the Suez Canal defences under 53rd (Welsh) Division, with 1/1st Montgomeryshire Yeomanry at Beni Salama, but in April it came under the command of Western Frontier Force (WFF). Following the Senussi campaign of 1915, the WFF was left guarding Egypt's western and southern frontier against any further incursions. 4th Dismounted Brigade covered the Bahariya front with patrols and outposts, though any Senussi activity was further north, so the brigade saw no fighting.

At the beginning of 1917 the Egyptian Expeditionary Force (EEF) was preparing to advance across Sinai into Palestine and required additional infantry. The dismounted brigades on the western frontier began to move east. In January 1917 the dismounted yeomanry of 4th Dismounted Bde were permanently re-roled as infantry. The brigade became 231st Brigade, which joined 74th (Yeomanry) Division on its formation in March 1917.

== 25th (Montgomery & Welsh Horse Yeomanry) Bn, Royal Welch Fusiliers ==
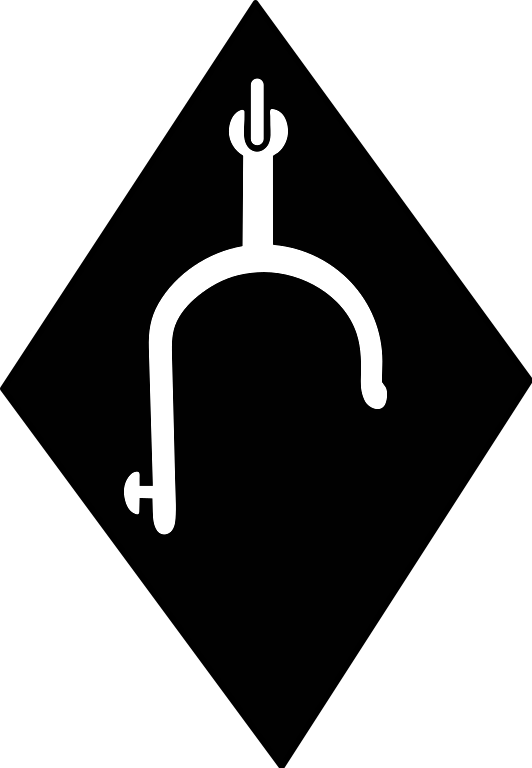
The 'broken spur' insignia of 74th (Yeomanry) Division.

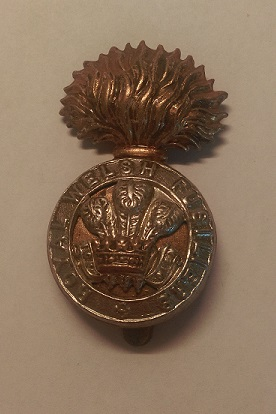
Royal Welsh Fusiliers' cap badge.

Cavalry regiments were smaller than infantry battalions, so the dismounted yeomanry regiments were paired to form effective battalions and these were affiliated to infantry regiments. On 4 March at Halmia, 1/1st Montgomeryshire Yeomanry amalgamated with 1/1st Welsh Horse Yeomanry to form 25th (Montgomery & Welsh Horse Yeomanry) Battalion, Royal Welch Fusiliers (RWF). (The Welsh Horse Yeomanry was a war-formed regiment administered by the Montgomeryshire Territorial Association. 1/1st Welsh Horse Yeomanry had fought at Gallipoli.) 25th Royal Welch Fusiliers was commanded by Lieutenant-Colonel Lord Kensington, CMG, DSO, a former officer in the 15th Hussars, who had been commanding the Welsh Horse Yeomanry.

=== Palestine ===
The division moved up into Palestine and after the failure of the First Battle of Gaza it began taking over the outpost line along the Wadi Ghuzzee on 7 April; 231st Bde took over at Khan Yunus on 11 April. 74th (Y) Division was in reserve for the Second Battle of Gaza beginning on 19 April, tasked with moving across the Wadi Ghuzzee following the divisions advancing on Gaza City. Soon after midnight 231st Bde moved down into the wadi, Lord Kensington complaining that troops from the attacking 52nd (Lowland) Division were occupying the same ground and did not move off until 04.15. However, this attack was also unsuccessful and although the division took a few casualties from enemy shellfire and aircraft attacks it was not engaged. The division dug in on its new positions on 20 April. Active operations shut down for several months during which the new division continued its organisation and training while carrying out a number of patrol actions. One night 25th RWF sent a party of two officers and 50 other ranks to raid the 'Cactus Garden' outside Gaza: finding about 80 Turks there the patrol dispersed them with bombs and bayonets and returned with prisoners, having suffered only two slight casualties.

==== Beersheba ====
Sir Edmund Allenby took over command of the EEF in May and began thorough preparations before launching the next offensive (the Third Battle of Gaza) on 27 October. On 25 October 231st Bde Group was at Nakhrur; that night it marched to Abu Sita, leaving the camp standing and campfires burning. The following night it continued to Gamli, where 230th Bde took over the front line and the rest of the division formed up behind. While Turkish attention was fixed on Gaza City by a heavy bombardment from land and sea, XX Corps, including 74th (Y) Division led by 229th Bde, made a night approach march on 30/31 October to attack Beersheba on the Turks' landward flank. The other two brigades of the division then moved up. After crawling from wadi to wadi under accurate shrapnel and machine gun fire, 231st Bde was within 500 yards (460 m) of the Turkish main defences by 10.40; the artillery cut the barbed wire and the brigades attacked at 12.15 through the dust clouds of the bombardment. 24th (Denbighshire Yeomanry) and 25th Bns RWF leading 231st Bde on right and left respectively met stout resistance: Acting-Corporal John Collins of the 25th is recorded as having bayonetted 15 Turks in one outpost that fought to the last. He had already carried wounded back for aid, and later advanced with a Lewis gun section beyond the objective to cover its consolidation. Collins was a Second Boer War veteran of the Royal Horse Artillery who had joined the Welsh Horse Yeomanry at the beginning of World War I. For his actions at Beersheba he was later awarded the Victoria Cross (VC). The two RWF battalions suffered nearly two-thirds of 74th (Y) Division's total casualties on the day, and also took three-quarters of its prisoners. The follow-up battalion, 24th (Pembroke & Glamorgan Yeomanry) Bn, Welsh Regiment then passed through and advanced 2,000 yards (1,800 m) into the Turkish positions. Meanwhile the Desert Mounted Corps swept round the flank and into Beersheba itself.

==== Sheria ====
The Capture of Beersheba was a resounding success, and XX Corps pressed on northwards as the Turks fell back to the Sheria Position. 229th Brigade led 74th (Y) Division's pre-dawn attack on this position on 8 November, without preliminary bombardment or barrage. 231st Brigade was echeloned back to the right to protect the flank and then take the high ground. Afterwards it was given the task of capturing the station at Tel Sheria, but this could not be completed until the fire and explosions in the abandoned Turkish ammunition dump died down at 03.30 next morning. The Capture of the Sheria feature broke the Turkish left, and they began a rapid retreat.

==== Jerusalem ====
While the mounted troops pursued the beaten enemy, 74th (Y) Division paused and re-equipped with winter clothing for the next phase of the campaign. By 25 November the division was about four days' march behind the fighting line, but it was brought up for the advance into the Judaean Hills towards Jerusalem. The Turks launched strong counter-attacks on 27 and 28 November, and 74th (Y) Division began arriving to reinforce the position on 29 November, 231st Bde having marched 12 out of the previous 18 hours. Coming under 52nd (L) Division the brigade took over scattered positions from the remnants of 8th Mounted Brigade. Lord Kensington was ordered to take 25th RWF through Et Tire and occupy a line from 'Point 1750' (which did not exist) to the village of Foqa (which 52nd (L) Divisional HQ did not realise had been abandoned the previous night). The battalion was held up by the rough country and it was not until 02.00 on 30 November that it reached Et Tire. One of its companies together with one from 10th (Shropshire & Cheshire Yeomanry) Bn King's Shropshire Light Infantry (KSLI) immediately attacked and captured 'Signal Hill' (which may have been the intended 'point 1750'). Major J.G. Rees (a captain in the Regular Army Reserve) then led another company of 25th RWF rapidly up the old Roman road to Foqa, the Lewis gun teams being unable to keep up. He warned his advance guard that they would find the village held by 'Scotsmen or Turks, probably the latter'. With about 80 men Rees found large numbers of Turks in the village, with arms piled, cooking their morning meal. Rees deployed his men and then ordered the Turks through his interpreter to surrender. Although six machine guns opened up, they did little damage among the houses, and some 450 Turks laid down their arms. Rees formed them up under their own officers and sent them to the rear with a small escort. The column took the wrong route and came under fire from both sides, at which a number of the prisoners escaped, but realising the situation the 11th Australian Light Horse gave covering fire and the tiny escort brought in 8 officers and 298 other ranks as prisoners. Major Rees now only had 60 men to hold Foqa against strong counter-attacks. He beat these off until 08.30 when, almost surrounded, he broke out the way he had come. At 14.30 the Turks also drove the 10th KSLI off Signal Hill and out of Et Tire. 24th Welsh temporarily recaptured Et Tire next day, but 231st and 229th Bdes had difficulty forming a solid defensive front in the confused country. However, on 8 December the EEF launched its final attack on Jerusalem. 74th (Y) Division's surprise attack on a narrow front was supported by flanking fire from 231st Bde in the Nebi Samwil defences (confused by the fact that there were also Turkish machine guns concealed in the ruined village). Next day Jerusalem surrendered and the division was then engaged in road-making for most of the month while the EEF defended Jerusalem against Turkish counter-attacks. 74th (Y) Division resumed its advance on 27 December and by 31 December the EEF had established a strong defence line. The division then went into reserve and resumed roadbuilding.

==== Tell 'Asur ====
By March the EEF was ready to advance into the Jordan Valley. 231st Brigade returned to the line first, under 53rd (W) Division, then 74th (Y) Divisional HQ took over for the planned attack. On the night of 8/9 March XX Corps moved against the high ground of Tell 'Asur dominating the valley. 74th (Y) Division advanced astride the Nablus road, with 231st Bde on the right directed at Mezrah esh Sherqiye, just east of the road and 1.5 miles (2.4 km) NNW of Tell 'Asur. 10th KSLI led, with 25th RWF in support. After an approach in the dark the brigade rushed the Turkish positions at Selwad at 04.00 without any preliminary artillery fire, a company of 25th RWF dealing with some Turkish machine guns in a flanking position. The battalion was now to take over the advance towards Mezrah esh Sherqiye, but it was faced with a steep machine-gun swept descent to the Wadi en Nimr, and 231st was out of touch with its flanking brigades. 230th Brigade on its left had fought its way through Yebrud and the hill beyond by 10.30, but was equally held up by Wadi el Jib. Both brigades resumed the advance after dark, 25th RWF deploying in the boulder-strewn bed of the Nimr at 20.30 without much trouble before assaulting the Lisaneh Ridge in front. It took until 03.00 on 10 March to reach the enemy position, which was carried after a sharp hand-to-hand fight. 25th RWF and 10th KSLI spent the rest of the night and next day driving off Turkish counter-attacks. They then advanced again just before midnight in heavy rain, finding no opposition But they now had to cross open country to attack Turmus Ayya, and 25th RWF was held up by heavy machine gun fire from the right, where 53rd (W) Division had yet to arrive. By now 230th Bde on the left was exhausted, so 74th (Y) Division was ordered to halt on the line it had taken. The Battle of Tell 'Asur was 74th (Y) Division's last action in the campaign.

=== Western Front ===
The German spring offensive on the Western Front left the British Expeditionary Force (BEF) in urgent need of reinforcements, and troops were sent from the EEF. 74th (Y) Division was warned on 3 April of an impending move to France; between 7 and 9 April it was relieved in the front line and by 13 April it had moved back to Lydda to concentrate. It then moved back to Egypt, arriving at Qantara on 20 April. On 29 April it began embarking at Alexandria and sailed for Marseille. The units began arriving on 7 May and immediately entrained for Noyelles. By 18 May the division had concentrated around Rue in the Abbeville district.

74th (Y) Division now embarked on training for the fighting conditions on the Western Front, principally anti-gas defence, but also including bayonet fighting (though the divisional historian pointed out that 'any one platoon of the 74th Division had probably made more use of the bayonet that any battalion in France'.) Towards the end of the month the division was moved forward between Doullens and St Pol and on 31 May it became part of the GHQ Reserve. It continued training around Le Cauroy, particularly for cooperation with tanks and aircraft, until 14 July. It then went into the line near Merville under XI Corps in Fifth Army. Here the marshy ground precluded trenches, and the defences consisted of breastworks.

In the line the 25th RWF began active patrolling. On the night of 17 July Sergeant Varley crossed the enemy breastwork and took away a machine gun while the sentry was looking in the other direction. Next day Lieutenant Jowett with 10 men made a daylight trench raid, bringing back five prisoners without suffering a casualty. In August Maj J.G. Rees was promoted to succeed Lt-Col Lord Kensington as commanding officer of 25th RWF, a position that he retained until the end of the war.

The Allies launched their counter-offensive (the Hundred Days Offensive) with the Battle of Amiens on 8 August. Although Fifth Army's front was distant from the battle, patrols from 74th (Y) Division found the enemy withdrawing from their frontline positions and cautiously followed up during August, with some skirmishing. By 18 August large fires were seen as the Germans destroyed supplies they could not evacuate. On 29 August the division began to entrain to move south and join in the Allied offensive.

==== Bapaume ====
On 30 August the division joined III Corps in Fourth Army, preparing for the next phase of the offensive, the Second Battle of Bapaume, opening on 2 September. The aim was to keep the Germans on the move, and 74th (Y) Division had little time for preparation. On the night of 1/2 September, a few hours after detraining it relieved 58th (2/1st London) Division in a tangled confusion of trenches, some of which were held in parts by both sides, from which it would have to jump off the following morning. 229th and 230th Bdes led, with 231st Bde in reserve. A neighbouring division had to capture its jumping-off trench before it could start, and enemy machine gun posts in No man's land had to be cleared before the advance began. The attack was therefore late starting, and the division lost its protective Creeping barrage. The defensive artillery fire was also much heavier than had been experienced against the Turks. The division's leading brigades were still in the line when the fighting ended on the Tortille valley at dusk, and although it took a few casualties 231st Bde did not get into the real fighting. Next morning it took over a portion of the line from the neighbouring 2nd Australian Division to form a defensive flank for 74th (Y) Division.

==== Pursuit to the Hindenburg Line ====
Nevertheless, the battle had been a success, and on 4 September Fourth Army began pursuing the Germans back towards their Hindenburg Line. On 7 September 231st Bde took up the lead, with 24th Welsh and 10th KSLI taking Villers-Faucon after some heavy fighting, 25th RWF acting in support before forming a flank guard. Next day 25th RWF took over the lead, attempting to take the trenches at Hargicourt, but the neighbouring 58th (2/1st L) Division was held up in front of Épehy and the battalion suffered considerable casualties from enfilade fire from that direction. Patrols found the enemy in strength everywhere and they were not shaken by the British artillery fire. The brigade fell back to its starting point by the end of the day. 229th Brigade and 58th (2/1st L) Division made a failed attempt on Épehy on 10 September, and it was clear that a fully prepared attack would have to be made.

==== Épehy ====
The Battle of Épehy was scheduled for 18 September, but preparations were hampered by German Mustard gas shelling the day before, which cased numerous casualties among 74th (Y) Division. The assault, timed for 05.20, was made behind a creeping barrage containing 10 per cent smoke shells, timed to lift 100 yards (91 m) every 3 minutes. The barrage was to pause for over an hour just beyond the first objective (the Green Line) to allow that to be consolidated. The advance was made through rain which made the ground slippery, but 231st Bde was on its first objective, the south side of Ronssoy, by 07.35, taking many prisoners without much resistance. While 24th Welsh remained to consolidate Ronssoy, 25th RWF passed through to follow the creeping barrage as it restarted at 08.30 towards the second objective (the Red Line). However, resistance now stiffened, the battalion lost the barrage and was stopped by massed machine gun fire from the 'Quadrilateral' on the left flank, which 18th (Eastern) Division had not yet reached. For conspicuous gallantry in attacking machine gun positions, Lance-Sergeant William Herbert Waring, a pre-war member of the Montgomeryshire Yeomanry serving with 25th RWF, won a posthumous VC. 231st Brigade had been brought to a standstill, but a fresh bombardment of the second objective was arranged for 16.00, allowing10th KSLI to complete its task. 18th (Eastern) Division had made less progress through Ronssoy, so 25th RWF was unable to make progress but formed a defensive flank to link it to the KSLI. Reduced to 120 men by the end of the day, and having suffered heavy casualties among its officers and NCOs, 25th RWF was temporarily reorganised into two companies commanded by 2nd Lieutenants.

The attack was renewed on 21 September. With its flank thrown back from the Red Line, 25th RWF had a tricky task in attacking the Quadrilateral, then swinging right (east) to allow 24th Welsh to pass through to Gillimont Farm, with 25th RWF finally retaking the lead to continue east to capture and consolidate the Blue Line. To assist in this assault the battalion was assigned four tanks, but two broke down before the start line and the others were knocked out by mines before reaching the first objective. It appears that 25th RWF successfully passed over the Quadrilateral and swung eastwards through an intense barrage, but 24th Welsh lost direction and simply followed 25th RWF rather carrying on to Gillimont Farm. Meanwhile 18th (E) Division was still held up and the dugouts and tunnels of the Quadrilateral were being reinforced from that side, so 10th KSLI were unable to 'mop up'. The 25th RWF therefore found themselves under fire from the rear. 231st Brigade suffered very heavy casualties, and by the end of the day it was back on its starting positions.

==== Advance to the Schelde ====
74th (Y) Division was now considered tired and was sent back to XI Corps with Fifth Army, beginning to entrain on 25 and arriving on 30 September. Far from getting a rest, it went straight into action as it relieved 19th (Western) Division in the line at Neuve-Chapelle on the night of 1/2 October. The divisional commander had no intention of using his exhausted men offensively, but the Germans began to withdraw on 2 October and 74th (Y) Division followed up for 2 miles (3.2 km). After barely a day in the reserve trenches, 231st Bde moved forward to Aubers Ridge, and on 3 October it continued the advance, meeting no opposition. On 4 October the advance was slowed by enemy artillery fire, and by nightfall patrols had found the enemy holding positions in strength.

While the pursuit paused, 74th (Y) Division returned to the command of III Corps on 8 October when that HQ arrived from the south. On 15 October patrols revealed that the Germans were withdrawing again, and the division followed up to the Haute Deule Canal. The enemy kept up fire from the canal until 04.30 on 17 October and then suddenly disappeared. 74th (Y) Division crossed the canal and followed up south of Lille. Next day, slowly advancing through fog, 231st Bde found the enemy rearguard of machine guns and field guns at Sainghin; the village was taken without difficulty and the brigade outposts advanced to the River la Marcq, where all the bridges had been destroyed. Next morning (19 October) the river was crossed without any opposition and the advance continued, with 231st Bde reaching Camphin, but the following morning the brigade was squeezed out of the line because of the division's shortening front. The Germans now held a strong belt of barbed wire at Orcq in front of Tournai on the River Schelde, and unable to make progress the division halted.

==== Tournai ====
On 4 November, the Germans suffered another crushing defeat at the Battle of the Sambre, and their retreat was resumed all along the line. Early on the morning of 8 November patrols of 25th RWF entered the western half of Tournai where civilians confirmed that the Germans had left at 03.00. All the bridges in the town had been blown and the enemy had machine guns lining the eastern bank. They left the following night and next morning the engineers had a footbridge across the Schelde by 07.00 and 10th KSLI crossed to the east side of the town. 25th RWF then passed through and became the advance guard of the division, moving forward to Thimougies by 18.45 (the Germans had left at 16.00). There was no contact with the enemy as the division advanced on 10 November. By 08.30 on 11 November the advanced troops had crossed the Dendre Canal and liberated Ath. 25th RWF was north of Ath when the advance was ended by the entry into force of Armistice with Germany at 11.00.

On 16 November the division moved into the area of Rebaix–Herinnes–Tournai and was employed on repairing the Tournai–Leuze railway. Between 15 and 18 December the division moved to the Lessines–Grammont–Herrines area. Demobilisation got under way early in 1919. 25th (Montgomeryshire & Welsh Horse Yeomanry) Battalion, Royal Welch Fusiliers was reduced to cadre in France, and disbanded on 29 June 1919.

== See also ==
- Montgomeryshire Yeomanry
- Welsh Horse Yeomanry
- Royal Welch Fusiliers
- John Collins (VC)
- William Herbert Waring, VC
