= Welsh Horse Yeomanry =

- Active: 18 August 1914 – 1919
- Country: United Kingdom
- Branch: British Army
- Type: Yeomanry
- Size: Three regiments
- Garrison/HQ: Cardiff
- Engagements: World War I Gallipoli 1915 Egypt 1915–17 Palestine 1917–18 France and Flanders 1918

The Welsh Horse Yeomanry was a yeomanry regiment of the British Army that served in the First World War. The regiment was raised shortly after the outbreak of the war. Initially it served in East Anglia on anti-invasion duties, before being dismounted in 1915 and sent to take part in the Gallipoli Campaign. After withdrawal to Egypt, it was amalgamated with the 1/1st Montgomeryshire Yeomanry as the 25th (Montgomery and Welsh Horse Yeomanry) Battalion, Royal Welch Fusiliers and served as such throughout the rest of the war. It took part in the Sinai and Palestine Campaign in 1917 and 1918, before being transferred to the Western Front where it remained until the end of the war. The regiment formed 2nd and 3rd Lines in 1914, but these never left the United Kingdom before being disbanded in 1916 and early 1917, respectively. The 1st Line was disbanded in 1919.

== History ==
=== Formation and early history ===
The Welsh Horse Yeomanry was raised on 18 August 1914 in South Wales by the Glamorganshire Territorial Force Association, with HQ at Sophia Gardens in Cardiff (since demolished). Later in the year, it was transferred to Montgomeryshire County T.F. Association, with HQ now at Newtown. The regiment was trained and equipped as lancers. Despite being the last yeomanry regiment to be raised, it was accorded precedence after the Glamorganshire Yeomanry due to its connection to the Glamorganshire T.F. Association at the time of its formation.

In accordance with the Territorial and Reserve Forces Act 1907 (7 Edw. 7, c.9) which brought the Territorial Force into being, the TF was intended to be a home defence force for service during wartime and members could not be compelled to serve outside the country. However, on the outbreak of war on 4 August 1914, many members volunteered for Imperial Service. Therefore, TF units were split in August and September 1914 into 1st Line (liable for overseas service) and 2nd Line (home service for those unable or unwilling to serve overseas) units. Later, a 3rd Line was formed to act as a reserve, providing trained replacements for the 1st and 2nd Line regiments.

=== 1/1st Welsh Horse Yeomanry ===
From early 1915, the 1st Line regiment was in 1/1st North Midland Mounted Brigade of 1st Mounted Division in the Diss area, replacing the Leicestershire Yeomanry which had been posted to 7th Cavalry Brigade with the British Expeditionary Force on the Western Front. About February 1915 it was transferred to 1/1st Eastern Mounted Brigade (this time replacing 2nd King Edward's Horse which had left for the Canadian Cavalry Brigade) in the Woodbridge area, still in 1st Mounted Division.

In September 1915, the regiment was dismounted and left Suffolk for Liverpool. On 24 September it boarded RMS Olympic and sailed the next day. It arrived at Mudros on 1 October and on 10 October it landed at Anzac Cove in Gallipoli. Along with its brigade, it was attached to the 54th (East Anglian) Division; the regiment was attached to 163rd Brigade, carrying out mining operations at Hill 60. Between 15 and 20 December, the regiment was evacuated to Mudros.

After the evacuation from Gallipoli, it moved to Egypt in December 1915 and on 22 February 1916 the Eastern and South Eastern Mounted Brigades were amalgamated into the 3rd Dismounted Brigade. It served as part of the Suez Canal Defences from 14 March to 26 July attached to 42nd (East Lancashire) Division; it then joined the Western Frontier Force. By the end of the year, it was back on the Suez.

=== 25th (Montgomery & Welsh Horse Yeomanry) Bn, Royal Welch Fusiliers ===
On 14 January 1917, Egyptian Expeditionary Force (EEF) Order No. 26 instructed that the 2nd, 3rd and 4th Dismounted Brigades be reorganized as the 229th, 230th and 231st Brigades. Consequently, on 4 March 1917, the regiment was amalgamated with the 1/1st Montgomeryshire Yeomanry as the 25th (Montgomery and Welsh Horse Yeomanry) Battalion, Royal Welch Fusiliers at Helmieh, Cairo. It joined 231st Brigade in the 74th (Yeomanry) Division. Lieutenant-Colonel Lord Kensington, CMG, DSO, a former officer in the 15th Hussars, who had been commanding the Welsh Horse Yeomanry, became commanding officer or the new battalion.

With 74th Division, the battalion took part in the invasion of Palestine in 1917 and 1918. Shortly after joining the division it took part in the Second Battle of Gaza (17–19 April 1917). Then in the autumn it fought in the Third Battle of Gaza (27 October–7 November). Shortly afterwards it was involved in the Capture of Jerusalem (8–9 December) and its subsequent defence (27–30 December). In March 1918, the battalion participated in the Battle of Tel 'Asur, but shortly afterwards was warned that it was to move to France, where reinforcements were urgently required to stem the German spring offensive.

In May 1918, the Division moved to France, and the battalion saw action on the Western Front. It took part in the Hundred Days Offensive including the Second Battle of the Somme (Second Battle of Bapaume) and the Battles of the Hindenburg Line (Battle of Épehy). In October and November 1918, it took part in the 'Final Advance' on Artois and Flanders. By the Armistice it was north of Ath, Belgium, still in 231st Brigade, 74th (Yeomanry) Division.

=== 2/1st Welsh Horse Yeomanry ===
The 2nd Line regiment was formed in 1914 at Newtown. In July 1915 it was in the 2/1st South Wales Mounted Brigade as a fourth regiment in the Doncaster area. In September 1915 it moved with the brigade to the Yoxford area where it joined the 1st Mounted Division. In 1916 the regiment was absorbed into the 2/1st Montgomeryshire Yeomanry. Lord Kenyon KCVO TD was the Commanding Officer.

=== 3/1st Welsh Horse Yeomanry ===
The 3rd Line regiment was formed in 1915 and in the summer was affiliated to a Reserve Cavalry Regiment in Ireland. In the summer of 1916 it was dismounted and attached to the 3rd Line Groups of the Welsh Division at Oswestry as its 1st Line was serving as infantry. The regiment was disbanded in early 1917 with personnel transferring to the 2/1st Montgomeryshire Yeomanry or to the 4th (Reserve) Battalion of the Royal Welsh Fusiliers at Oswestry.

=== Postwar ===
25th (Montgomeryshire & Welsh Horse Yeomanry) Battalion, Royal Welch Fusiliers was reduced to cadre in France, and disbanded on 29 June 1919. None of the three regiments of the Welsh Horse Yeomanry was reformed in the postwar Territorial Force.

== Victoria Cross ==
The Victoria Cross is the highest and most prestigious award for gallantry in the face of the enemy that can be awarded to British and Commonwealth forces. One member of the regiment won the award while serving with the 25th (Montgomery and Welsh Horse Yeomanry) Battalion, Royal Welsh Fusiliers:

- Corporal John Collins on 31 October 1917 at Wadi Saba, Beersheba, Palestine

== Battle honours ==
The Welsh Horse Yeomanry was awarded the following battle honours for service in World War I:

Somme 1918, Bapaume 1918, Hindenburg Line, Épéhy, Pursuit to Mons, France and Flanders 1918, Gallipoli 1915, Egypt 1915–17, Gaza, Jerusalem, Jericho, Tell 'Asur, Palestine 1917–18

== See also ==
- Yeomanry
- Yeomanry order of precedence
- British yeomanry during the First World War
- Second line yeomanry regiments of the British Army

== Bibliography ==
- Maj A.F. Becke,History of the Great War: Order of Battle of Divisions, Part 2a: The Territorial Force Mounted Divisions and the 1st-Line Territorial Force Divisions (42–56), London: HM Stationery Office, 1935/Uckfield: Naval & Military Press, 2007, ISBN 1-847347-39-8.
- Maj A.F. Becke,History of the Great War: Order of Battle of Divisions, Part 2b: The 2nd-Line Territorial Force Divisions (57th–69th), with the Home-Service Divisions (71st–73rd) and 74th and 75th Divisions, London: HM Stationery Office, 1937/Uckfield: Naval & Military Press, 2007, ISBN 1-847347-39-8.
- J.B.M. Frederick, Lineage Book of British Land Forces 1660–1978, Vol I, Wakefield: Microform Academic, 1984, ISBN 1-85117-007-3.
- Brig E.A. James, British Regiments 1914–18, London: Samson Books, 1978, ISBN 0-906304-03-2/Uckfield: Naval & Military Press, 2001, ISBN 978-1-84342-197-9.
- Mileham, Patrick (1994). The Yeomanry Regiments; 200 Years of Tradition. Edinburgh: Canongate Academic. ISBN 1-898410-36-4.
- Owen, Bryn (1990). Owen Roscomyl and the Welsh Horse. Palace Books.
- Rinaldi, Richard A (2008). Order of Battle of the British Army 1914. Ravi Rikhye. ISBN 978-0-97760728-0.
- Westlake, Ray (1996). British Regiments at Gallipoli. Barnsley: Leo Cooper. ISBN 0-85052-511-X.
- Order of Battle of the British Armies in France, November 11th, 1918. France: General Staff, GHQ. 1918.
- Maj C.H. Dudley Ward, The 74th (Yeomanry) Division in Syria and France, London: John Murray, 1922/Uckfield: Naval & Military Press, 2004, ISBN 1-843428-71-7.

=== External links ===
- Chris Baker, The Long, Long Trail
- "Welsh Horse (Lancers) at regiments.org by T.F.Mills". Archived from the original on 19 April 2007.
- "Welsh Horse Yeomanry on The Regimental Warpath 1914 - 1918 by PB Chappell". Archived from the original on 28 February 2013.
- "Welsh Horse (Lancers) Yeomanry Research Papers". National Library of Wales.
