= 1/1st Denbighshire Hussars =

1/1st Denbighshire Hussars 24th (Denbighshire Yeomanry) Bn, Royal Welch Fusiliers
- Active: 10 August 1914–1919
- Country: United Kingdom
- Branch: Territorial Force
- Type: Yeomanry
- Role: Cavalry/Infantry
- Size: Regiment/Battalion
- Part of: Welsh Border Mounted Brigade; 74th (Yeomanry) Division; 31st Division
- Garrison/HQ: 1 Erdigg Street, Wrexham
- Engagements: Second Battle of Gaza; Third Battle of Gaza; Capture of Beersheba; Capture of the Sheria feature Capture of Jerusalem; Defence of Jerusalem; Capture of Jericho; Battle of Tell 'Asur; Hundred Days Offensive; Action of Le Becque; Capture of Vieux-Berquin; Fifth Battle of Ypres; Action at Tieghem

The 1/1st Denbighshire Hussars was an active service unit formed by the Denbighshire Hussars during World War I. It was sent to garrison Egypt and then formed an infantry battalion, the 24th (Denbighshire Yeomanry) Battalion of the Royal Welch Fusiliers. Serving in the 74th (Yeomanry) Division (the 'Broken Spur Division') it participated in the Sinai and Palestine campaign, including the capture of Beersheba and Jerusalem. Moving to the Western Front it fought with the 31st Divisionin the final advance in Flanders until the Armistice. It was disbanded after the war.

== Mobilisation ==
When war was declared on 4 August 1914, the Denbighshire Hussars, a Yeomanry regiment of the Territorial Force (TF), mobilised at its drill hall at 1 Erdigg Street, Wrexham, under Lieutenant-Colonel H.P. Sykes, a retired Regular Army captain who had been in command since 21 December 1910. It assembled with the Welsh Border Mounted Brigade (WBMB) and went with it to its war stations in East Anglia.

The part-time TF was intended to be a home defence force in wartime and its members could not be compelled to serve overseas. However, on 10 August 1914 the TF was invited to volunteer for overseas service and the majority did so. On 15 August the War Office issued instructions to separate those men who had signed up for Home Service only, and form these into reserve units. On 31 August, the formation of a reserve or 2nd Line unit was authorised for each 1st Line unit where 60 per cent or more of the men had volunteered for Overseas Service. The titles of these 2nd Line units would be the same as the original, but distinguished by a '2/' prefix. In this way duplicate battalions, brigades and divisions were created, mirroring the 1st Line TF formations being sent overseas. Later, the 2nd Line was prepared for overseas service and a 3rd Line was formed to act as a reserve, providing trained replacements for the 1st and 2nd Line regiments.

== 1/1st Denbighshire Hussars ==
The 1/1st Denbighshire Hussars was stationed with the 1/1st WBMB in north-east Suffolk. The following month the brigade became part of the 1st Mounted Division. While training in East Anglia the division was at the same time part of the defence forces for the East Coast, and there were numerous false invasion alarms. By November 1915 the 1st Mtd Division had moved south into Norfolk, and that month its regiments were dismounted. They were now being readied for despatch to the Middle Eastern theatre.

=== Egypt ===
On 5 March 1916 the 1/1st WBMB sailed to Egypt in company with the 1/1st South Wales Mounted Brigade from 1st Mtd Division. They disembarked at Alexandria on 15 March and on 20 March the two brigades were merged to form the 4th Dismounted Brigade. At first this was placed in the Suez Canal defences under 53rd (Welsh) Division, with 1/1st Denbighshire Hussars at Mohara, but in April it came under the command of Western Frontier Force (WFF).

Following the Senussi campaign of 1915, the WFF was left guarding Egypt's western and southern frontier against any further incursions. 4th Dismounted Brigade covered the Bahariya front with patrols and outposts, though any Senussi activity was further north, so the brigade saw no fighting.

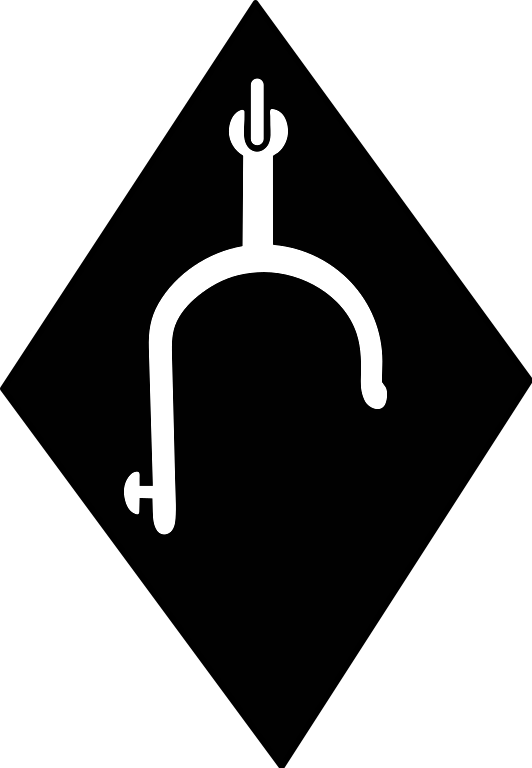
The 'broken spur' insignia of 74th (Yeomanry) Division'

At the beginning of 1917 the Egyptian Expeditionary Force (EEF) was preparing to advance across Sinai into Palestine and required additional infantry. The dismounted brigades on the western frontier began to move east. In January 1917 the dismounted yeomanry of 4th Dismounted Bde were permanently re-roled as infantry. The brigade became 231st Brigade, which joined 74th (Yeomanry) Division on its formation in March 1917.

== 24th (Denbighshire Yeomanry) Bn, Royal Welch Fusiliers ==
In February, the dismounted Yeomanry regiments comprising the new division were converted into numbered battalions of an infantry regiment recruiting from the same area. Thus on 1 March 1917 1/1st Denbighshire Hussars became 24th (Denbighshire Yeomanry) Battalion of the Royal Welch Fusiliers. (Note: Taking the number of a Home Service battalion of the RWF raised in 1916 and disbanded by the beginning of 1917.) (RWF).

=== Palestine ===
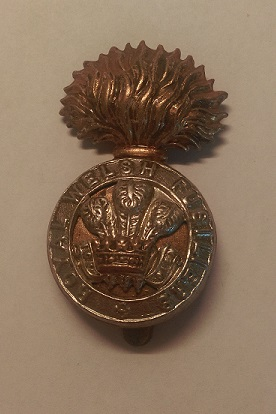
Royal Welch Fusiliers cap badge.

231st Brigade assembled at Khan Yunis, 24th RWF arriving on 4 April. The EEF had already made one unsuccessful attack on Gaza; now 74th (Y) Division began taking over the outpost line along the Wadi Ghuzzee on 7 April. The division was in reserve for the Second Battle of Gaza beginning on 19 April, tasked with moving across the Wadi Ghuzzee following the divisions advancing on Gaza City. Soon after midnight 231st Bde moved down into the wadi, complicated by the fact that troops from the attacking 52nd (Lowland) Division were occupying the same ground and did not move off until 04.15. However, this attack was also unsuccessful and although the division took a few casualties from enemy shellfire and aircraft attacks it was not engaged. The division dug in on its new positions on 20 April. Active operations shut down for several months during which the new division continued its organisation and training while carrying out a number of patrol actions.

==== Beersheba ====
Sir Edmund Allenby took over command of the EEF in May and began thorough preparations before launching the next offensive (the Third Battle of Gaza) on 27 October. During August the yeomanry battalions carried out intensive training in the desert in platoon tactics and musketry. On 25 October 231st Bde Group was at Nakhrur; that night it marched to Abu Sita, leaving the camp standing and campfires burning. The following night it continued to Gamli, where 230th Bde took over the front line and the rest of the division formed up behind. While Turkish attention was fixed on Gaza City by a heavy bombardment from land and sea, XX Corps, including 74th (Y) Division led by 229th Bde, made a night approach march on 30/31 October to attack Beersheba on the Turks' landward flank. The other two brigades of the division then moved up. After crawling from wadi to wadi under accurate shrapnel and machine gun fire, 231st Bde was within 500 yards (460 m) of the Turkish main defences by 10.40; the artillery cut the barbed wire and the brigades attacked at 12.15 through the dust clouds of the bombardment. The leading battalions of 231st Bde were 24th RWF on the right and 25th (Montgomery and Welsh Horse Yeomanry) Bn, RWF, on the left. They immediately came under heavy and accurate shrapnel fire and met stout resistance but broke into the position. The two RWF battalions suffered nearly two-thirds of 74th (Y) Division's total casualties on the day, and also took three-quarters of its prisoners. The follow-up battalion, 24th (Pembroke & Glamorgan Yeomanry) Bn, Welsh Regiment, then passed through and advanced 2,000 yards (1,800 m) into the Turkish positions. Meanwhile the Desert Mounted Corps swept round the flank and into Beersheba itself.

==== Sheria ====
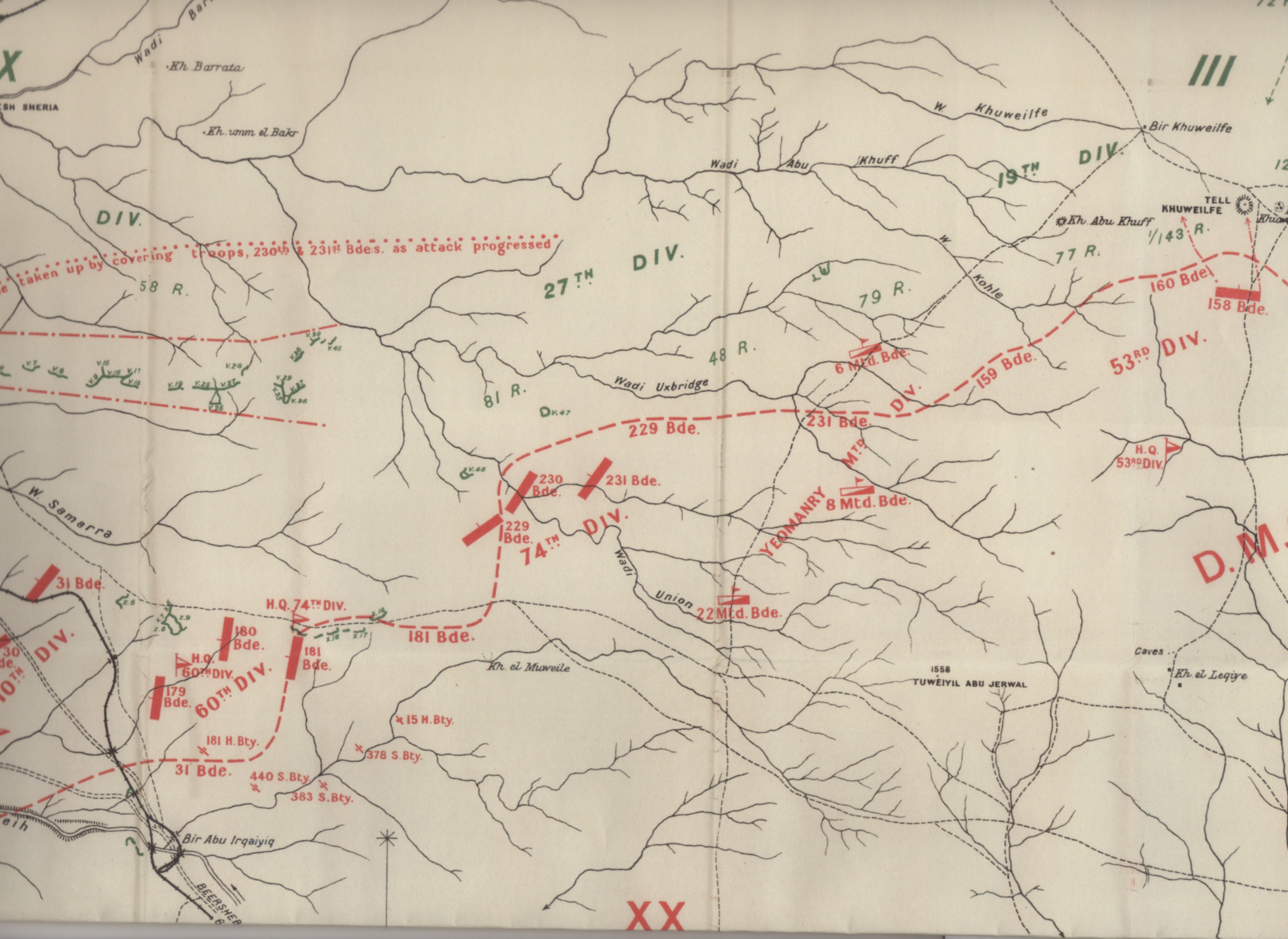
XX Corps' attack on 6 November.

The Capture of Beersheba was a resounding success, and XX Corps pressed on northwards as the Turks fell back to the Sheria Position. 229th Brigade led 74th (Y) Division's pre-dawn attack on this position on 6 November, without preliminary bombardment or barrage. 231st Brigade was echeloned back to the right to protect the flank and then take the high ground. Afterwards 231st Bde was given the task of capturing the station at Tel Sheria, but this could not be completed until the fire and explosions in the abandoned Turkish ammunition dump died down at 03.30 next morning. The Capture of the Sheria feature broke the Turkish left, and they began a rapid retreat.

==== Jerusalem ====
While the mounted troops pursued the beaten enemy, 74th (Y) Division paused and re-equipped with winter clothing for the next phase of the campaign. By 25 November the division was about four days' march behind the fighting line, but it was brought up for the advance into the Judaean Hills towards Jerusalem. The Turks launched strong counter-attacks on 27 and 28 November, and 74th (Y) Division began arriving to reinforce the position on 29 November, 231st Bde having marched 12 out of the previous 18 hours. Coming under 52nd (L) Division the brigade took over scattered positions from the remnants of 8th Mounted Brigade, 24th RWF filling the gap across to the neighbouring 60th (2/2nd London) Division, so it took little part in the confused fighting on 29/30 November. Although. 25th RWF temporarily captured the hilltop village of Foqa and 24th Welsh briefly recaptured Et Tire next morning, the positions were untenable and they were compelled to fall back to the high ground and begin building a defensive line of stone sangars. 231st and 229th Bdes had difficulty forming a solid defensive front in the confused country. However, on 8 December the EEF launched its final attack on Jerusalem. 74th (Y) Division's surprise attack on a narrow front was supported by flanking fire from 231st Bde in the Nebi Samwil defences (confused by the fact that there were also Turkish machine guns concealed in the ruined village). Next day Jerusalem surrendered and the division was then engaged in road-making for most of the month while the EEF defended Jerusalem against Turkish counter-attacks. 74th (Y) Division resumed its advance on the morning of 27 December, led by 229th Bde. 24th RWF then took up the attack at 10.15, having concentrated in the Wadi Salman in front of Beit Duqqu during the night. One company captured Kh. Dreihemeh while two others attacked Hill 2450 and succeeded in reaching the crest. However, neither group could get beyond the summits, and each was enfiladed by fire from the enemy on the reverse slope of the other feature. The companies on Hill 2450 were attacked again and again, and forced slightly down the hill. During the afternoon a second assault was delivered after an artillery bombardment, but the Turkish machine guns on Kh. Dreihemeh swept the crest of Hill 2450 and the attempt failed. The positions were held until 22.00 when 24th RWF, having suffered heavy casualties, was relieved by 24th Welsh. Next morning 229th and 231st Bdes worked their way forwards on the other hills, splitting the enemy fire; 231st Bde was withdrawn into reserve by the end of 8 December. By 31 December the EEF had established a strong defence line covering Jerusalem. The division then went into reserve and resumed roadbuilding.

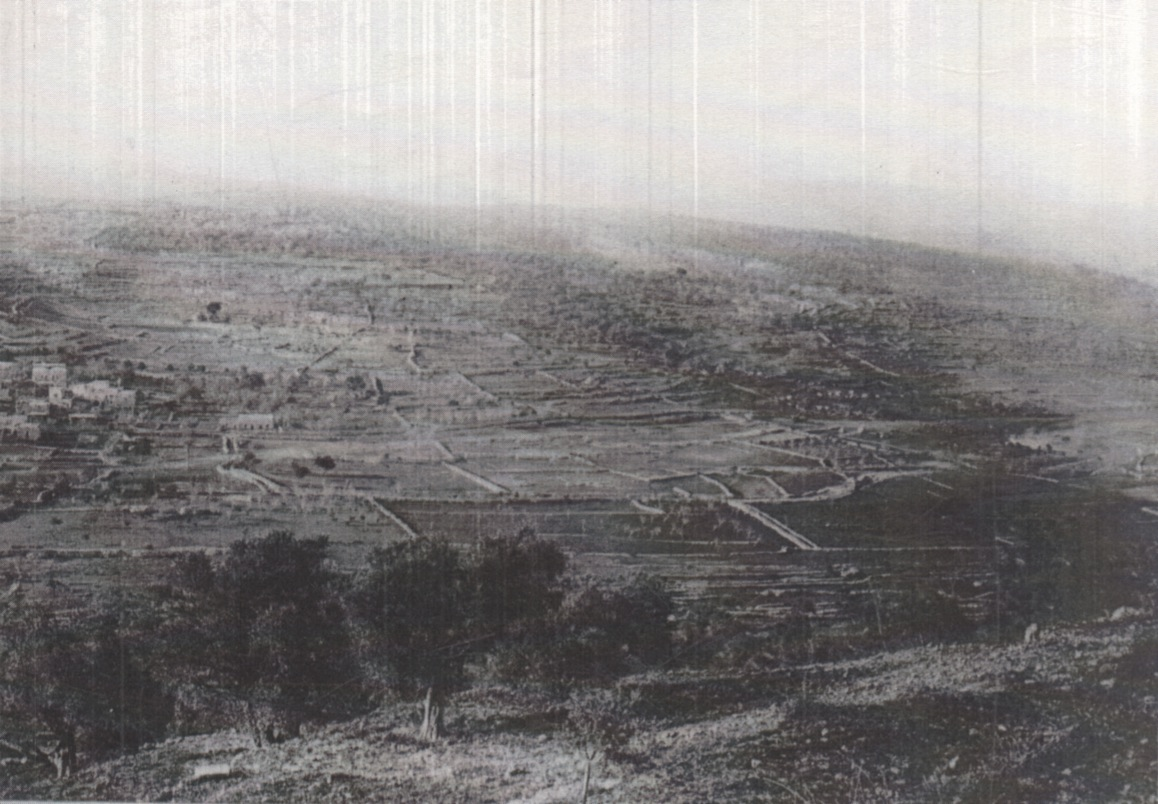
74th (Yeomanry) Division's view north up the Jerusalem–Nablus road, early 1918.

==== Jericho ====
231st Brigade worked on the Biddu–Beitunia road until 16 February 1918 when it was placed at the disposal of 60th (2/2nd L) Division for operations towards the River Jordan. On 19 February the EEF launched an attack towards Jericho, with 231st Bde supporting 181st (2/6th London) Bde at Mukhmas. 181st Brigade advanced over difficult country through Ras el Tawil against machine gun fire from the retreating Turkish rearguards. It got to within 2 miles (3.2 km) of the escarpment overlooking the Jordan Valley, then 231st Brigade then took over, with 24th RWF supporting 10th King's Shropshire Light Infantry. Early next morning patrols reached the escarpment and could see British mounted troops and armoured cars entering Jericho 231st Brigade was then released by 60th (2/2nd L) Division and 24th RWF returned to Ras el Tawil and resumed roadbuilding.

==== Tell 'Asur ====
By March the EEF was ready to advance into the Jordan Valley and 74th (Y) Division was brought up once more. 231st Brigade returned to the line first, under 53rd (W) Division, with 24th RWF and 24th Welsh taking over the line on 27 February. The Turkish lines were lightly held, so on 1/2 March the RWF advanced the line to the high ground without opposition, and the next night 24th Welsh pushed further forward. The two battalions made another small advance on 6/7 March, with 24th RWF moving north-west of Sinia, but the only casualties came from climbing the steep hills.

74th (Y) Divisional HQ now took over the front for the planned attack. On the night of 8/9 March XX Corps moved against the high ground of Tell 'Asur dominating the valley. 74th (Y) Division advanced astride the Nablus road, with 231st Bde on the right directed at Mezrah esh Sherqiye, just east of the road and 1.5 miles (2.4 km) NNW of Tell 'Asur. After an approach in the dark the brigade rushed the Turkish positions at Selwad at 04.00 without any preliminary artillery fire, 10th KSLI leading; 24th RWF played little part in the attack. The brigade swept through the positions but was then faced with a steep machine-gun swept descent to the Wadi en Nimr, and was so far ahead that it was out of touch with its flanking brigades. It resumed the advance after dark, the leading battalions climbing the ridge beyond the wadi and carrying the position at 03.00 on 10 March. By now 230th Bde on the left was exhausted, so 74th (Y) Division was ordered to halt on the line it had taken. The Battle of Tell 'Asur was 74th (Y) Division's last action in the campaign.

=== Western Front ===
The German spring offensive on the Western Front left the British Expeditionary Force (BEF) in urgent need of reinforcements, and troops were sent from the EEF. 74th (Y) Division was warned on 3 April of an impending move to France; between 7 and 9 April it was relieved in the front line and by 13 April it had moved back to Lydda to concentrate. It then moved back to Egypt, arriving at Qantara on 20 April. On 29 April it began embarking at Alexandria, and sailed for Marseille. The convoy arrived on 7 May and the division entrained for Noyelles. By 18 May the division had concentrated around Rue in the Abbeville district. 74th (Y) Division now embarked on training for the fighting conditions on the Western Front, principally anti-gas defence, but also including bayonet fighting (though the divisional historian pointed out that 'any one platoon of the 74th Division had probably made more use of the bayonet that any battalion in France'.) Towards the end of the month the division was moved forward between Doullens and St Pol and on 31 May it became part of the GHQ Reserve but continued training around Le Cauroy

=== 31st Division ===
31st Division's formation sign.

Due to a lack of replacements, British infantry divisions on the Western Front had been reduced from 12 to nine battalions at the beginning of 1918. To conform with this new structure, one battalion left each brigade of 74th (Y) Division, 24th RWF being the one selected from 231st Bde. On 21 June the three battalions were used to reconstitute 94th Brigade of 31st Division, which was renamed the 94th (Yeomanry) Brigade on that date.

The reconstituted 31st Division was assigned to Second Army in the north, and although the Battle of the Lys had ended several weeks before, minor activity was ceaseless on the army's front. On 28 June 31st Division carried out a successful operation at La Becque Farm to advance the line by about 1 mile (1.6 km) from the Forest of Nieppe, allowing the British to occupy an outpost line clear of the forest that was under constant gas shelling. 94th (Y) Brigade was not involved in the main attack on this occasion.

=== Hundred Days Offensive ===
The Allies launched their counter-offensive (the Hundred Days Offensive) with the Battle of Amiens on 8 August. The Germans had already been withdrawing troops facing Second Army to meet this threat, and on the night of 8/9 August Second Army began cautiously advancing. XV Corps, including 31st Division, captured the village of Vieux-Berquin on 13 August and pushed on towards the Outtersteene Ridge. This was largely captured by 9th (Scottish) and 29th Divisions on 18 August, but part remained uncaptured and at 17.00 next afternoon 94th (Y) Bde attacked alongside 29th Division to complete the operation. 12th (Norfolk Yeomanry) Bn, Norfolk Regiment, led for 94th (Y) Bde, covered by a creeping barrage, and the brigade carried all its objectives, reaching the Vieux-Berquin–Outtersteene road. This success threatened the Germans in the Merville Salient with encirclement, and they began a fresh retirement.

Second Army now began planning a major offensive (the Fifth Battle of Ypres). Fires could be seen behind the enemy lines as they destroyed their supply dumps and prepared to retreat. From 27 September the Allies carried out a coordinated series of offensives along the Western Front. Second Army launched its assault on 28 September, with 31st Division attacking Ploegsteert Wood ('Plugstreet Wood') in the afternoon. However, 94th (Y) Brigade only left Hazebrouck that morning and got held up at Nord; it did not arrive until 07.00 on 29 September, and the division's confusion was so great that the planned advance for that day was postponed. 94th (Y) Brigade set off at 04.00 on 30 September, coming up the Ploegsteert–La Basse Ville road in support behind 92nd Bde. At 06.00 it began to cross the 1 mile (1.6 km) of country to La Basse Ville–Warneton, meeting no opposition until it reached the ridge overlooking the River Lys where it was brought to a halt by machine gun fire. Finally, at 17.30 the fire decreased and the brigade was able to reach the river. On 2 October 31 Division made an almost unopposed advance past Armentières, having strict orders not to go through the ruined town, which might have been booby-trapped.

After the completion of the Fifth Battle of Ypres on 2 October, Second Army began preparing for its next bound, the Battle of Courtrai. When 31st Division carried out its advance on 16–17 October, it found no enemy in front, and it was not until 18 October, after it had passed through Tourcoing, that it contacted the enemy rearguards again. On 20 October the division closed up towards the River Schelde against slight opposition, but that night its front and rear areas were shelled and gassed incessantly. The division was rested and then moved to II Corps. When it came back into the line the enemy were no longer giving ground and were again deluging the area with shellfire and gas. The corps would have to make a set-piece attack to advance further.

This was the Action at Tieghem on 31 October. 94th (Y) Brigade led for 31st Division, with Zero Hour at 05.25. German retaliation to the British barrage was not severe, but German machine gun posts fought hard in the farms and villages of the densely populated countryside. The first objective was reached on schedule at 06.45, and after a two hour pause the second was taken between 10.00 and 11.00. The following day the brigade's patrols encountered no opposition, the Germans having fallen back behind the Schelde. About 15.00 on 1 November at Driesch the brigade made contact with the French troops coming up on their left. II Corps then went into reserve.

On 4 November 31 Division switched to XIX Corps. The Germans continued to hold the line of the Schelde until 8 November when they began to withdraw and fires and explosions could be seen in their rear areas. 31st Division established patrols along the riverbank and by 10 November was a cross the river. On 11 November it was pushing forward from Avelghem to Renaix when the Armistice with Germany came into force at 11.00.

On 13 November the division began to move back and by the end of the month was quartered around St Omer. Demobilization of key workers began in December, and gathered pace in the new year. By March 1919 most of the division's units had been reduced to a cadre. Soon afterwards 24th (Denbigh Yeomanry) Battalion, Royal Welch Fusiliers, was disembodied.
