= Charles Heathcote =

Charles Heathcote may refer to:

- Charles Edensor Heathcote (1875–1947), British Army officer
- Charles Gilbert Heathcote (1841–1913), English barrister and tennis player
- Charles Henry Heathcote (1850–1938), British architect

== See also ==
- Heathcote (surname)
