= 74th (Yeomanry) Division =

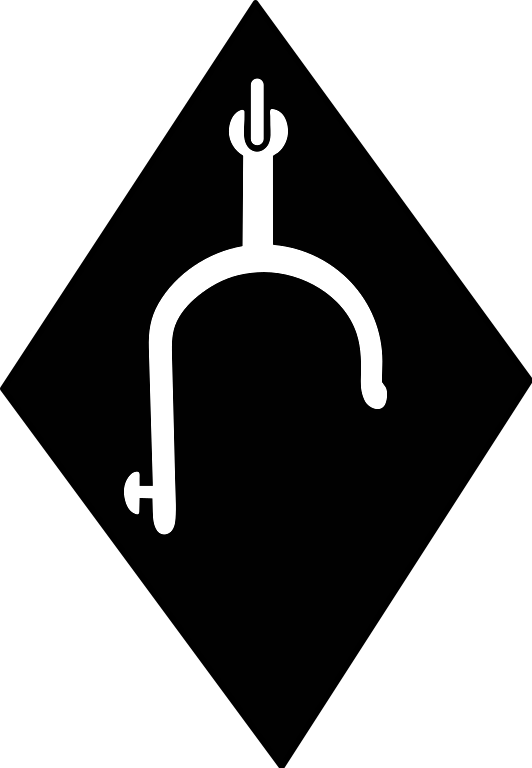
- The "Broken Spur" insignia of the division
- Active: 25 February 1917 – 10 July 1919
- Country: United Kingdom
- Branch: British Army
- Type: Dismounted Yeomanry
- Size: Division
- Engagements: First World War; Sinai and Palestine campaign; Second Battle of Gaza; Battle of Beersheba; Battle of Jerusalem; Battle of Tell 'Asur; Western Front; Battle of Épehy; Second Battle of Bapaume

The 74th (Yeomanry) Division was a Territorial Force infantry division formed in Palestine in early 1917 from three dismounted yeomanry brigades. It served in the Sinai and Palestine Campaign of the First World War, mostly as part of XX Corps. In May 1918 it was sent to the Western Front where it remained until the end of the war.

The division's insignia was a broken spur to signify that its units were once mounted but now served as infantry.

== History ==
=== Formation ===
On 14 January 1917, Egyptian Expeditionary Force (EEF) Order No. 26 instructed that the 2nd, 3rd and 4th Dismounted Brigades (then with the Suez Canal Defences) be reorganized as the 229th, 230th and 231st Brigades.

On 23 February 1917, Lieutenant General Sir Archibald Murray, the General Officer Commanding EEF, sought permission from the War Office to form the 229th, 230th and 231st Brigades into a new division. On 25 February, the War Office granted permission and the new 74th (Yeomanry) Division started to form. It was acknowledged that it would take some time for artillery, engineers and auxiliary services to complete the division.

The division began to assemble from 4 March at el Arish. The 229th Brigade joined at el Arish by 9 March, the 231st Brigade joined at Khan Yunis by 6 April and the 230th Brigade joined by 13 April at Deir el Balah. The other divisional units (cavalry squadron, engineer field companies, veterinary section, and the train), had joined by April. The artillery did not become a part of the division until July and August (after the division had already fought in the Second Battle of Gaza).

Order of Battle, May 1917
Formation / Organization	Units
229th Brigade	16th (Royal 1st Devon and Royal North Devon Yeomanry) Battalion, Devonshire Regiment
229th Brigade	12th (West Somerset Yeomanry) Battalion, Somerset Light Infantry
229th Brigade	12th (Ayrshire and Lanarkshire Yeomanry) Battalion, Royal Scots Fusiliers
229th Brigade	14th (Fife and Forfar Yeomanry) Battalion, Black Watch
229th Brigade	4th Company, Machine Gun Corps
229th Brigade	229th Trench Mortar Battery
229th Brigade	229th Field Ambulance, RAMC
230th Brigade	10th (Royal East Kent and West Kent Yeomanry) Battalion, Buffs (Royal East Kent Regiment)
230th Brigade	12th (Norfolk Yeomanry) Battalion, Norfolk Regiment
230th Brigade	15th (Suffolk Yeomanry) Battalion, Suffolk Regiment
230th Brigade	16th (Sussex Yeomanry) Battalion, Royal Sussex Regiment
230th Brigade	209th Company, Machine Gun Corps
230th Brigade	230th Trench Mortar Battery
230th Brigade	230th Field Ambulance, RAMC
231st Brigade	24th (Denbighshire Yeomanry) Battalion, Royal Welch Fusiliers
231st Brigade	25th (Montgomery and Welsh Horse Yeomanry) Battalion, Royal Welch Fusiliers
231st Brigade	24th (Pembroke and Glamorgan Yeomanry) Battalion, Welsh Regiment
231st Brigade	10th (Shropshire and Cheshire Yeomanry) Battalion, King's Shropshire Light Infantry
231st Brigade	210th Company, Machine Gun Corps
231st Brigade	231st Trench Mortar Battery
231st Brigade	231st Field Ambulance, RAMC
Artillery	XLIV Brigade, RFA (Note: XLIV Brigade, RFA transferred from England and landed at Alexandria on 27 May 1917 with 340, 382 and 399 Batteries, each of four 13-pounders. It reached Sidi el Bishr on 2 June and was reorganized and re-equipped as two batteries of six 18-pounders (399 Battery was broken up to complete the other two). 340 Battery was renamed 'A' Battery and 382 renamed 'B'. The brigade joined the division at Rafah on 3 July.) (A and B Batteries)
Artillery	CXVII Brigade, RFA (Note: CXVII Brigade, RFA from 26th Division in Salonika; landed at Alexandria on 5 July with 'A', 'B', 'C' and 'D' (H) Batteries, twelve 18-pounders and four 4.5" howitzers. It reached el Ferdan on 6 July and was reorganized as two batteries of six 18-pounders ('C' Battery was broken up to complete 'A' and 'B' Batteries) and one battery of four 4.5" howitzers ('D' (H) Battery renamed 'C' (H) Battery). The brigade joined the division at Deir el Balah on 9 August.) (A, B and C (H) Batteries)
Artillery	CCLXVIII Brigade, RFA (Note: CCLXVIII Brigade, RFA formed at el Ferdan on 17 June and joined the division at Deir el Balah on 23 July. B Battery, CCCI Brigade RFA from 60th (2/2nd London) Division in Salonika joined the brigade at el Ferdan on 17 June and became A Battery (six 18-pounder guns). 366 Battery, CXLVI Brigade RFA from 28th Division in Salonika joined the brigade on 11 July and became B Battery (also with six 18-pounder guns). D (H) Battery, CCCII Brigade RFA from 60th (2/2nd London) Division in Salonika joined the brigade at el Ferdan on 19 June and became C (H) Battery (equipped with four 4.5" howitzers).) (A, B and C (H) Batteries)
Artillery	74th Divisional Ammunition Column (Note: Formed between 21 June and 10 July from parts of the ammunition columns of XLIV and CXVII Brigades, RFA.)
Divisional Troops	A Squadron, 1/2nd County of London Yeomanry (Note: Joined the division at Khan Yunis on 5 April. Left on 23 August for XX Corps Cavalry Regiment.)
Divisional Troops	5th Field Company, Royal Monmouthshire Royal Engineers (Note: Joined the division at Deir el Balah by 19 April.)
Divisional Troops	5th Royal Anglesey Field Company, Royal Engineers (Note: Joined the division at Deir el Balah on 14 April.)
Divisional Troops	74th Divisional Signal Company (Note: Formed from 2 March and joined the division at Rafah by 28 March.)
Divisional Troops	59th Mobile Veterinary Section (Note: Joined the division at Deir el Balah on 13 April.)
Divisional Troops	74th Divisional Train (Note: Formerly the Divisional Train of 42nd (East Lancashire) Division which remained in Egypt when 42nd Division transferred to France in February 1917. It was attached to 53rd (Welsh) Division from 20 March for the Gaza operations. It was assigned to 74th Division on 1 April and redesignated 74th Divisional Train on 13 April.) (447th, 448th, 449th and 450th Companies, ASC)

=== Palestine 1917–18 ===
The 74th Division took part in the invasion of Palestine in 1917 and 1918.

The division was not fully formed when it participated in the Second Battle of Gaza between 17 and 19 April 1917. It acted as reserve to the Eastern Force and was not engaged. Thereafter, the division was assigned to XX Corps where it remained for the rest of its time in Palestine.

In October and November 1917, the division took part in the Third Battle of Gaza (including the capture of Beersheba on 31 October and the Sheria Position on 6 November). At the end of 1917, it took part in the capture and defence of Jerusalem and in March 1918 in the Battle of Tell 'Asur. On 3 April 1918, the division was warned that it would move to France and by 30 April 1918 had completed embarkation at Alexandria.

Before departure for France, the 4th (of 229th Brigade), 209th (of 230th Brigade), 210th (of 231st Brigade) and 261st MG Companies formed 74th Battalion, Machine Gun Corps. It concentrated at Alexandria between 17 and 30 April and departed for France with the division on the latter date.

The artillery was also restructured in March and April 1918 before departing for France. On 21 March, 'A' Battery of CCLXVIII Brigade, RFA (A/CCLXVIII) returned to 60th (2/2nd London) Division where it resumed its original identity as B/CCCI. It was replaced by 425 Battery which was redesignated A/CCLXVIII. Then, between 11 and 21 April, the artillery was reorganized as two brigades at Lydda:

Old designation	New designation
XLIV Brigade, RFA	XLIV Brigade, RFA
A Battery	resumed identity as 340 Battery
B Battery	resumed identity as 382 Battery
	former A/CCLXVIII resumed identity as 425 Battery
	former C (H)/CCLXVIII as D (H) Battery
CXVII Brigade, RFA	CXVII Brigade, RFA
	former B/CCLXVIII resumed identity as 366 Battery
A Battery	A Battery
B Battery	B Battery
C (H) Battery	D (H) Battery
CCLXVIII Brigade, RFA	broken up
A Battery	transferred to XLIV Brigade as 425 Battery
B Battery	transferred to CXVII Brigade as 366 Battery
C (H) Battery	transferred to XLIV Brigade as D (H) Battery

Each brigade now consisted of three batteries of six 18-pounders and a battery of four 4.5" howitzers. Each of the howitzer batteries were later made up to six 4.5" howitzers in France (on 21 May 1918 at Noulette).

=== France and Flanders 1918 ===
In May 1918, the 74th (Yeomanry) Division landed at Marseille, France. It served in France and Flanders for the rest of the war. By 18 May, the division had concentrated around Rue in the Abbeville area. Here the dismounted Yeomanry underwent training for service on the Western Front, particularly gas defence.

Due to a lack of replacements, British (Note: As distinct from the Australian, Canadian and the New Zealand divisions which remained on a 12-battalion basis.) infantry divisions on the Western Front had been reduced from 12 to nine battalions in January and February 1918. To conform with this new structure, on 21 June, 12th Royal Scots Fusiliers (of 229th Brigade), 12th Norfolk Regiment (of 230th Brigade) and 24th Royal Welsh Fusiliers (of 231st Brigade) left the 74th (Yeomanry) Division. They were used to reconstitute 94th Brigade of 31st Division which was renamed the 94th (Yeomanry) Brigade on that date. On 16 May, the Pioneer Battalion, 1/12 Loyal North Lancashire Regiment, was reduced from a 4-company to a 3-company organization.

Order of Battle, June 1918
Formation / Organization	Units
229th Brigade	16th (Royal 1st Devon and Royal North Devon Yeomanry) Battalion, Devonshire Regiment
229th Brigade	12th (West Somerset Yeomanry) Battalion, Somerset Light Infantry
229th Brigade	14th (Fife and Forfar Yeomanry) Battalion, Black Watch
229th Brigade	229th Trench Mortar Battery
229th Brigade	229th Field Ambulance, RAMC
230th Brigade	10th (Royal East Kent and West Kent Yeomanry) Battalion, Buffs (Royal East Kent Regiment)
230th Brigade	15th (Suffolk Yeomanry) Battalion, Suffolk Regiment
230th Brigade	16th (Sussex Yeomanry) Battalion, Royal Sussex Regiment
230th Brigade	230th Trench Mortar Battery
230th Brigade	230th Field Ambulance, RAMC
231st Brigade	25th (Montgomery and Welsh Horse Yeomanry) Battalion, Royal Welsh Fusiliers
231st Brigade	24th (Pembroke and Glamorgan Yeomanry) Battalion, Welsh Regiment
231st Brigade	10th (Shropshire and Cheshire Yeomanry) Battalion, King's Shropshire Light Infantry
231st Brigade	231st Trench Mortar Battery
231st Brigade	231st Field Ambulance, RAMC
Artillery	XLIV Brigade, RFA (340, 382, 425 and 'D' (H) Batteries)
Artillery	CXVII Brigade, RFA (366, 'A', 'B' and 'D' (H) Batteries)
Artillery	X.74 Medium Trench Mortar Battery, RFA (Note: X and Y Batteries were formed at Fifth Army Trench Mortar School on 1 June and joined the division on 12 June. On 14 June, the batteries received twelve Newton 6 inch Mortars.)
Artillery	Y.74 Medium Trench Mortar Battery, RFA
Artillery	74th Divisional Ammunition Column
Divisional Troops	5th Field Company, Royal Monmouthshire Royal Engineers
Divisional Troops	5th Field Company, Royal Anglesey Royal Engineers
Divisional Troops	439th (2/1st Cheshire) Field Company, Royal Engineers (Note: 439th Field Company (2/1st Cheshire Field Company redesignated on 4 February 1917) joined the division from 53rd (Welsh) Division at Ramle on 9 April 1918.)
Divisional Troops	74th Divisional Signal Company
Divisional Troops	1/12 (Pioneer) Battalion, Loyal North Lancashire Regiment (T.F.) (Note: Joined the division from 60th (2/2nd London) Division at Sarafand (Sarafand al-Amar or possibly Sarafand al-Kharab) on 10 April 1918.)
Divisional Troops	74th Battalion, Machine Gun Corps (4th, 209th, 210th and 261st Companies, MGC)
Divisional Troops	59th Mobile Veterinary Section
Divisional Troops	985th Divisional Employment Company (Note: Formed in the division on 18 May 1918.)
Divisional Troops	74th Divisional Train (447th, 448th, 449th and 450th Companies, ASC)

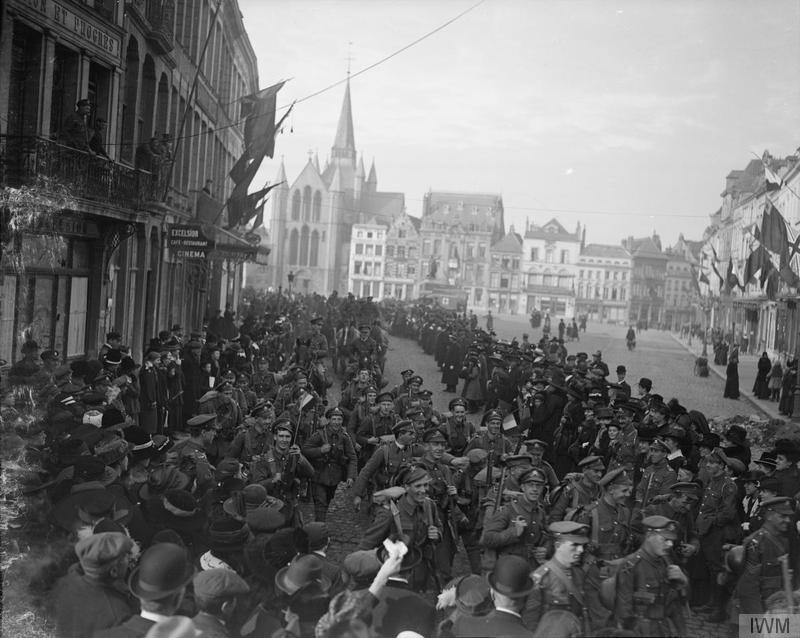
74th (Yeomanry) Division marches through the liberated city of Tournai on 10 November 1918.

On 14 July 1918 the 74th (Yeomanry) Division went into the line for the first time, near Merville on the right of XI Corps. From September 1918, as part of III Corps of Fourth Army, it took part in the Hundred Days Offensive including the Second Battle of the Somme (Second Battle of Bapaume) and the Battles of the Hindenburg Line (Battle of Épehy). In October and November 1918, it took part in the 'Final Advance' on Artois and Flanders. By the Armistice of 11 November 1918 it was in the area of Tournai, Belgium.

With the end of the war, the troops of 74th Division were engaged in railway repair work and education was undertaken while demobilisation began. The division and its subformations were disbanded on 10 July 1919.

== Commanders ==
74th (Yeomanry) Division was commanded throughout its existence by Major General E.S. Girdwood.

== Battles ==
- Second Battle of Gaza
- Battle of Beersheba
- Third Battle of Gaza
- Battle of Jerusalem
- Battle of Tell 'Asur
- Second Battle of Bapaume
- Battle of Épehy

== See also ==
- List of British divisions in World War I
- British yeomanry during the First World War

== Bibliography ==
- Becke, Archibald F. (1936). Order of Battle of Divisions Part 2A. The Territorial Force Mounted Divisions and the 1st-Line Territorial Force Divisions (42–56). London: HMSO. OCLC 4405016.
- Becke, Archibald F. (1937). Order of Battle of Divisions Part 2B. The 2nd-Line Territorial Force Divisions (57th–69th) with The Home-Service Divisions (71st–73rd) and 74th and 75th Divisions. London: HMSO. OCLC 4405016.
- Becke, Archibald F. (1945). Order of Battle of Divisions Part 3B. New Army Divisions (30-41) & 63rd (R.N.) Division. London: HMSO. OCLC 4405016.
- Dudley Ward, C. H. (1922). The 74th (Yeomanry) Division in Syria and France. London: John Murray.
- Falls, Cyril; MacMunn, G. (1930). Military Operations Egypt & Palestine from the outbreak of war with Germany to June 1917. Official History of the Great War Based on Official Documents by Direction of the Historical Section of the Committee of Imperial Defence. Vol. I. London: HMSO. OCLC 610273484.}
- Haythornthwaite, Philip J. (1996). The World War One Source Book. London: Arms and Armour Press. ISBN 1-85409-351-7.
- James, Brigadier E. A. (1978). British Regiments 1914–18. London: Samson Books. ISBN 0-906304-03-2.
