= 231st Brigade (United Kingdom) =

231st Brigade 231st Independent Infantry Brigade 231st Infantry Brigade
- Formation sign of the 231st Independent Infantry Brigade while in Malta and shortly after.
- Active: 14 January 1917 – 10 July 1919; 1943–1945
- Country: United Kingdom
- Branch: British Army
- Type: Infantry
- Size: Brigade
- Part of: 74th (Yeomanry) Division; 50th (Northumbrian) Infantry Division
- Engagements: First World War; Second World War

Commanders
- Notable commanders: Roy Urquhart; Alfred Dudley Ward; Sir Alexander Stanier

The 231st Brigade was an infantry brigade of the British Army that saw active service in both the First and the Second World Wars. In each case it was formed by redesignation of existing formations. In the First World War, it fought in Palestine and on the Western Front, while during the Second World War it served in the Allied invasion of Sicily, Italy and the Normandy landings of 6 June 1944.

== First World War ==
In March 1916 the South Wales Mounted Brigade and Welsh Border Mounted Brigade, both composed of Yeomanry regiments of the Territorial Force in 1st Mounted Division, were dismounted and sent to Egypt to serve as infantry. Together, they formed 4th Dismounted Brigade. Between January and March 1917 the small Yeomanry regiments were amalgamated and numbered as battalions of infantry regiments recruiting from the same districts. The brigade was renumbered 231st Brigade and joined 74th (Yeomanry) Division in the first week of April 1917.

=== Order of Battle ===
231st Brigade was constituted as follows during the First World War:

- 24th (Denbighshire Yeomanry) Battalion, Royal Welch Fusiliers (left 21 June 1918)
- 25th (Montgomery and Welsh Horse Yeomanry) Battalion, Royal Welch Fusiliers
- 24th (Pembroke and Glamorgan Yeomanry) Battalion, Welsh Regiment
- 10th (Shropshire and Cheshire Yeomanry) Battalion, King's Shropshire Light Infantry
- 210th Machine Gun Company, Machine Gun Corps (joined 74th Battalion Machine Gun Corps 11 April 1918)
- 231st Trench Mortar Battery (formed 15 May 1917)
- 231st Field Ambulance, Royal Army Medical Corps

=== Commanders ===
The following officers commanded 231st Brigade during the First World War:

- Brigadier-General E.A. Herbert (commanding Welsh Border Mounted Brigade since 1912)
- Lieutenant Colonel Lord Kensington (acting, 28 April – 5 May and 21 July – 2 September 1917)
- Brigadier-General W.J. Bowker (from 5 May; sick 21 July 1917)
- Brigadier-General C.E. Heathcote (from 2 September 1917)

=== Palestine ===
Shortly after joining 74th Division, the brigade took part in the Second Battle of Gaza (17–19 April 1917). Then in the autumn it fought in the Third Battle of Gaza (27 October – 7 November) including the Battle of Beersheba (31 October) and the capture of the Sheria Position (6 November). Shortly afterwards it was involved in the Capture of Jerusalem (8–9 December) and its subsequent defence (27–30 December). In March 1918, the brigade was in the Battle of Tel 'Asur, but shortly afterwards was warned that it was to move to France, where reinforcements were urgently required to stem the German spring offensive.

Before departure for France, the 210th Machine Gun Company joined 4th (of 229th Brigade), 209th (of 230th Brigade) and 261st Machine Gun companies to form 74th Battalion, Machine Gun Corps. It concentrated at Alexandria between 17 and 30 April and departed for France with the division on the latter date.

=== Western Front ===
The 74th Division embarked at Alexandria for Marseille on 29–30 April 1918, and was concentrated in the Abbeville district by 18 May. Here the dismounted Yeomanry underwent training for service on the Western Front, including gas defence. Infantry brigades on the Western Front had been reduced to three battalions, and 231st Brigade lost the 24th Royal Welsh Fusiliers, which went to form part of the 94th (Yeomanry) Brigade in the reconstituted 31st Division.

On 14 July 1918 the Yeomanry Division went into the line for the first time. During the Allies' victorious Hundred Days Offensive it fought in the Second Battle of Bapaume (2–3 September) and the Battle of Épehy (18 September), and took part in the succession of small fights during the final advance. On 18 October, while advancing towards Lille, 231st Brigade 'found the machine-gun defenders of Sainghin assisted by a field battery, and they resisted stoutly; although the village was cleared during the morning, it was dusk before the Germans were driven out of the wood beyond and across the la Marque, and all the bridges being destroyed they could not be followed'.

During the night of 8/9 November, patrols from 231st Brigade probed the German defences of Tournai and worked their way down to the River Scheldt. The Germans had withdrawn to the east bank, and 231st Brigade seized the northern bridge but could get no further against machine-gun fire from the far bank, and all the other bridges in the town had been blown up. At 07.00 on 9 November, 10th King's Shropshire Light Infantry crossed by a footbridge laid by the engineers at the northern end of the town, and the rest of the brigade followed through this bridgehead. When the Armistice with Germany came into effect on 11 November, the division was across the River Dendre at Ath.

After the fighting ended, the troops of 74th Division were engaged in railway repair while demobilisation began. The division and its subformations were disbanded on 10 July 1919.

== Second World War ==
A new 231st Infantry Brigade was created in the Second World War on 1 April 1943 by the redesignation of the 1st (Malta) Infantry Brigade. This was composed of three Regular Army battalions that had been stationed on or been transported to Malta since the start of the Second World War and had served there during the siege. After Generalfeldmarschall Erwin Rommel's defeat at the Second Battle of El Alamein, in late 1942, Malta lost some of its strategic significance and the 231st Independent Infantry Brigade, joined the British Eighth Army in North Africa, who were preparing for the Allied invasion of Sicily (Operation Husky).

=== Sicily and Italy ===
The Allied invasion of Sicily was to be the first of three amphibious assault landings conducted by the 231st Brigade during the war. The brigade was constituted as an independent brigade group under the command of Brigadier Roy Urquhart, later famous as commander of the 1st Airborne Division, which was destroyed at Arnhem in September 1944. After some hard fighting, including the 2nd Devons at Regalbuto amongst the foothills of Mount Etna, the Germans were driven from Sicily and the Allies prepared to invade Italy. Despite the success of the relatively brief campaign, the brigade sustained almost 600 casualties, with the 1st Hampshires losing over 300 men, the 1st Dorsets 189 and the 2nd Devons 113. The campaign ended in mid-August and the 231st Brigade was withdrawn for a short rest to prepare for the next operation.

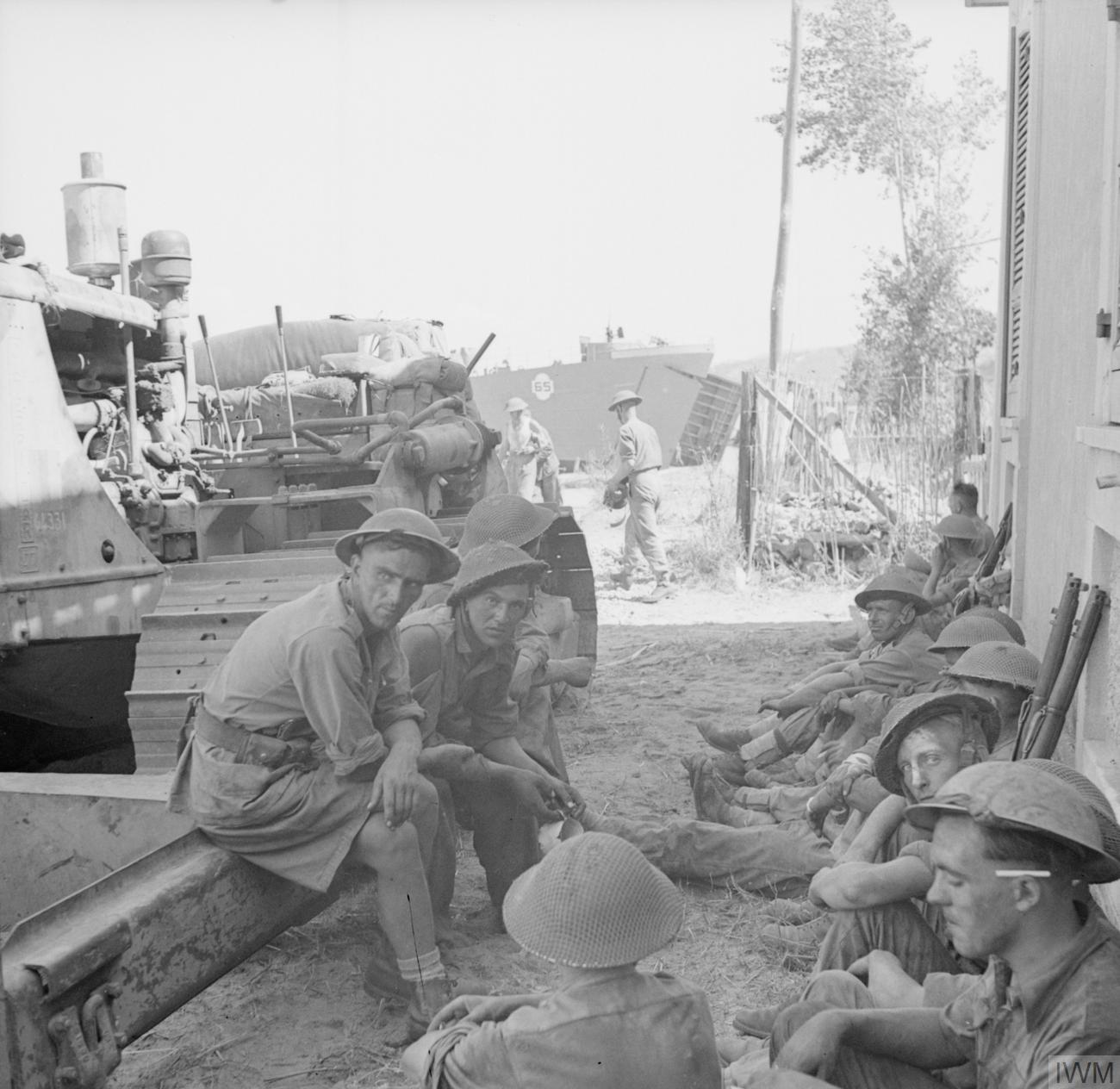
Troops of the 231st Brigade resting beside a bulldozer after fighting a fire on a landing craft which was hit during a surprise landing in the enemy's rear at Porro Di S. Venere, Italy, 8 September 1943.

The 231st Brigade's second assault landing was at Porto San Venere on 7 September 1943, when the Allies invaded Italy. They were now experienced amphibious assault troops. After this, the 231st Brigade became an integral part of the veteran 50th (Northumbrian) Infantry Division and was recalled to England with the division, to prepare for the Allied invasion of Normandy, scheduled for the spring of 1944. In February 1944 Brigadier Sir A. B. G. Stanier assumed command of the brigade.

=== Gold Beach ===
Gold Beach was the codename for the centre invasion beach during the Allied invasion of Normandy, 6 June 1944 or D-Day. It lay between Omaha Beach and Juno Beach, was 8 km wide and divided into four sectors. From west to east they were How, Item, Jig, and King. This was the hardest and costliest of the 231st Brigade's three assault landings and the Battle of Normandy exacted a heavy toll on the brigade.

The task of invading Gold Beach was given to the 50th Infantry Division and the 8th Armoured Brigade. The beach was assaulted in multiple brigades of the 50th Infantry Division; on the West was the 231st Infantry Brigade, followed by the 56th Brigade, attached to this was a regiment of DD tanks from Sherwood Rangers Yeomanry, the infantry assault battalions that attacked in the west were; the 1st Battalion, Hampshire Regiment, and the 1st Battalion, Dorsetshire Regiment. On the east the 69th Brigade, followed by 151st Brigade, again a regiment of DD tanks was attached, they were from the 4th/7th Royal Dragoon Guards.

Universal Carriers of 50th Division wade ashore from LCTs on Jig beach, Gold area, 6 June 1944. The markings on the carrier indicate a vehicle from the 1st Battalion, Dorsetshire Regiment, 231st Brigade.

Their primary objective was to seize the town of Bayeux, the Caen-Bayeux road, and the port of Arromanches with the secondary objectives being to make contact with the Americans landing at Omaha Beach to the West and the Canadians landing at Juno Beach to the East. The 716th Static Infantry Division commanded by Generalleutnant Wilhelm Richter, and elements of the 352nd Infantry Division commanded by Generalleutnant Dietrich Kraiss, defended the Channel coast for the Germans. H-Hour for the Gold beach landing was set for 0725 hours.

At 0725 hours, the 50th Infantry Division assault landed Gold beach with the objective of taking the beach, then moving to Bayeux and making a rendezvous with the American troops at Omaha Beach. The landing crafts were deployed seven miles off the beach, compared to the American ones that were deployed 12 miles off the beaches, this meant they had a shorter run in.

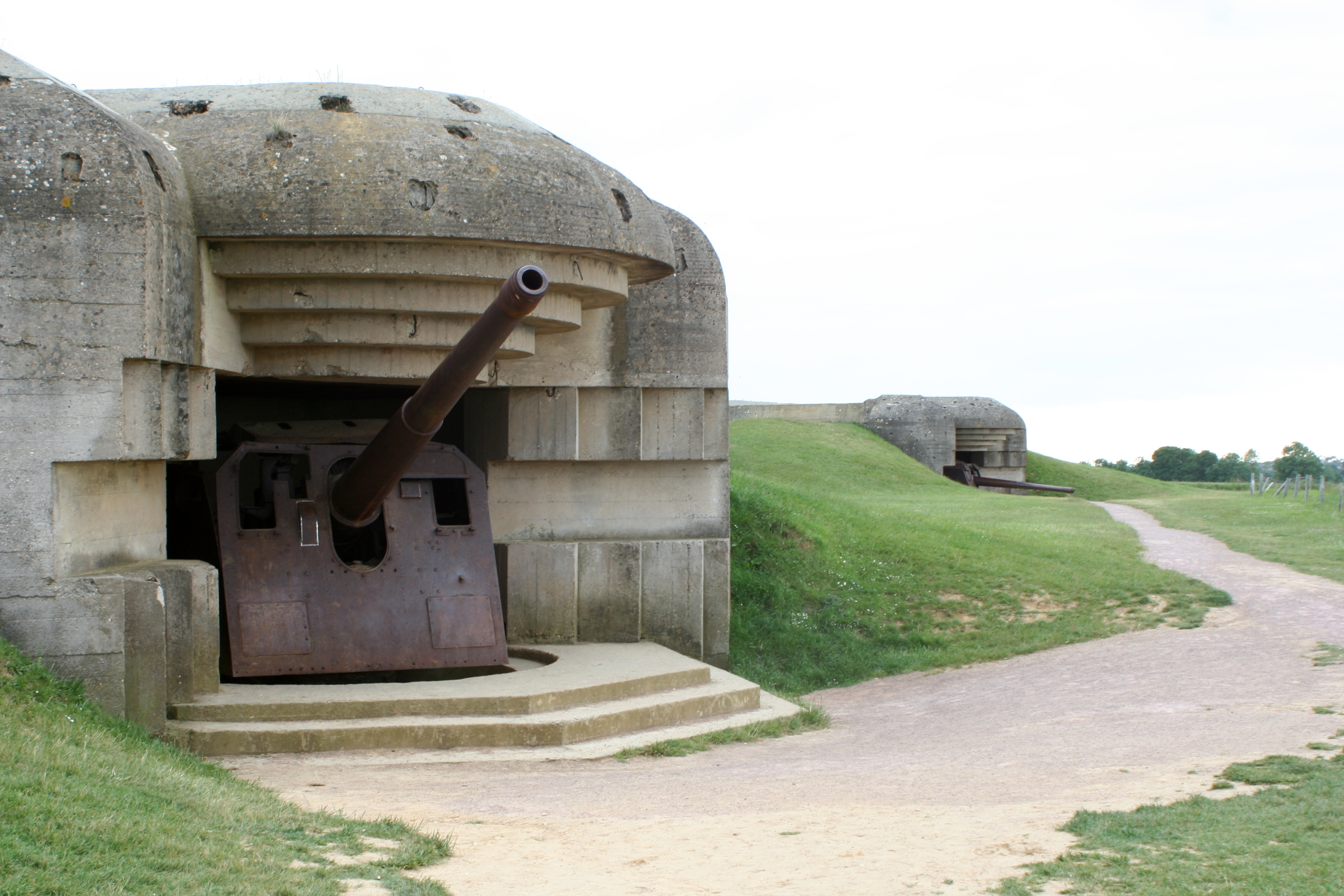
Two of the bunkers of Longues-sur-Mer.

The first battalion to come ashore suffered heavy casualties, among them their CO and the second-in-command, because their Higgins boats grounded earlier than expected and they had to wade ashore.

By midnight on the 6 June 1944, 24,970 men had landed on Gold Beach, and had penetrated six miles into occupied France. They fulfilled one of their secondary objectives by meeting up with the 3rd Canadian Infantry Division who had landed at Juno Beach, but failed in their primary objective of reaching the Caen-Bayeux road and in their secondary objective of meeting the Americans from Omaha Beach. However they had established a foothold into Fortress Europe that would ultimately be a stepping stone to victory.

The Longues-sur-Mer gun battery (as seen in the film The Longest Day where the German officer looks out at the invasion fleet), surrendered on 7 June to the 231st Brigade.

=== North West Europe ===
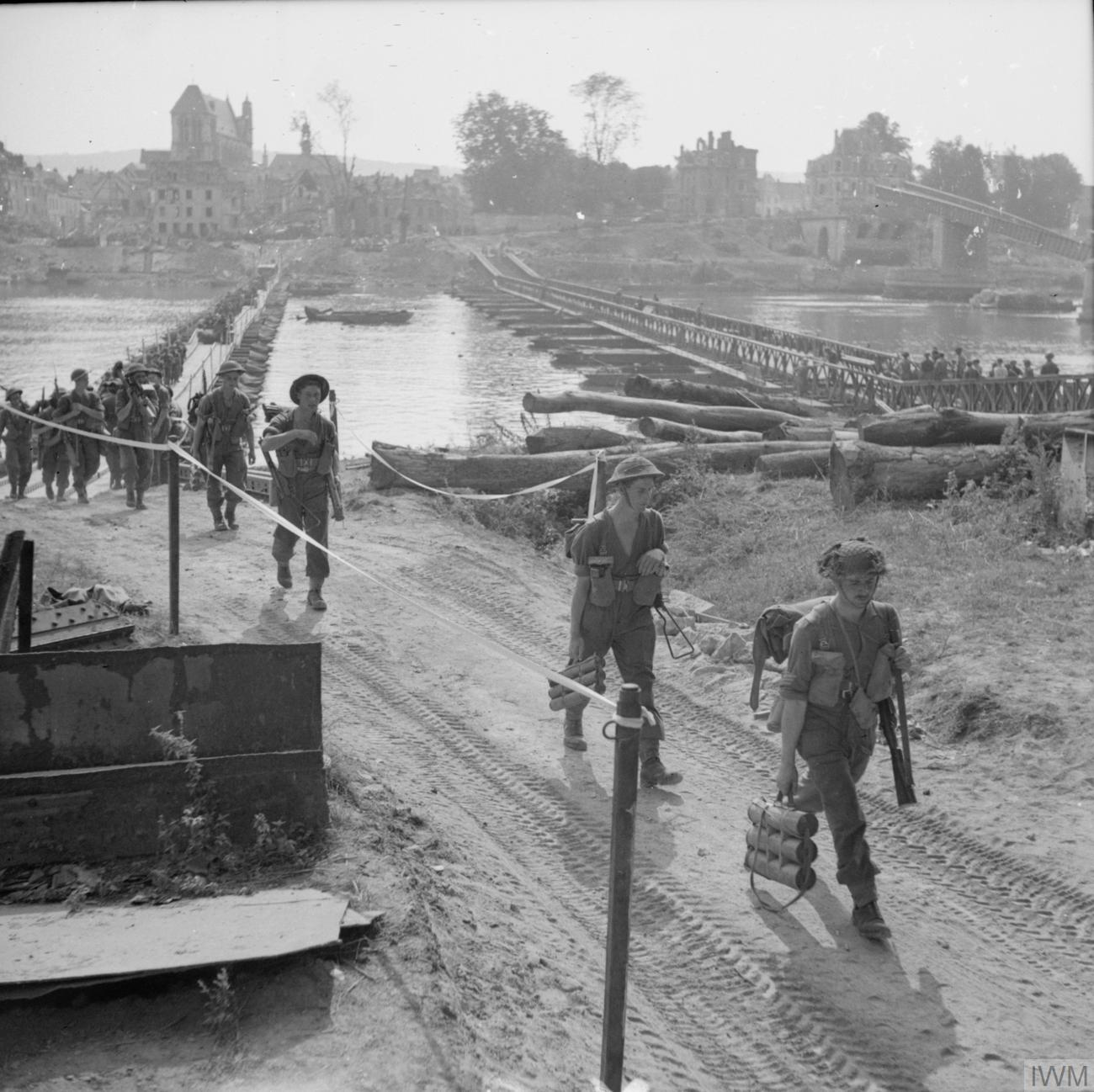
Infantrymen of the 1st Battalion, Hampshire Regiment crossing the Seine at Vernon, 28 August 1944.

After Normandy the brigade followed the armoured divisions across northern France to Belgium, where they assisted the Guards Armoured Division, in liberating Brussels, and on the Dutch border. They held Joe's Bridge in Lommel across the Escaut Canal at the start of XXX Corps, advance to Arnhem during Operation Market Garden and was then present during the Nederrijn campaign in North West Europe.

Much depleted, the 231st Brigade was transferred back to the United Kingdom in December 1944, to serve as a Training Brigade. At the same time, it exchanged the 2nd Battalion Devonshire Regiment, for the 1/6th Battalion, Queen's Royal Regiment (West Surrey) from the 131st (Queens) Brigade.

=== Order of Battle ===
The following units constituted the 231st Brigade during the Second World War:

- 2nd Battalion, Devonshire Regiment (left 30 November 1944)
- 1st Battalion, Hampshire Regiment
- 1st Battalion, Dorsetshire Regiment
- 1/6th Battalion, Queen's Royal Regiment (West Surrey) (from 4 December 1944)

Between 1 May and 24 September 231 Brigade was constituted as an independent brigade group with the following additional units under command:

- 165th Field Regiment, Royal Artillery
- 300th Anti-Tank Battery, Royal Artillery
- 352nd Light Anti-Aircraft Battery, Royal Artillery
- 66th Field Company, Royal Engineers (from 1 May until 5 August 1943)
- 295th Field Company, Royal Engineers (from 7 August until 23 September 1943)
- 346 Company RASC Royal Army Service Corps
- 200th Field Ambulance, Royal Army Medical Corps

=== Commanders ===
The following officers commanded the 231st Brigade during the Second World War:

- Brigadier K.P. Smith
- Brigadier R.E. Urquhart (from 19 May 1943)
- Brigadier A.D. Ward (from 30 September 1943)
- Brigadier G.W.B. Tarleton (from 9 October 1943)
- Brigadier G. Murray (from 11 December 1943)
- Brigadier Sir Alexander Stanier, Bart (from 23 February 1944)
- Brigadier J.D. Russell (from 14 February 1945)

== See also ==
- South Wales Mounted Brigade
- Welsh Border Mounted Brigade
- British yeomanry during the First World War
