= John Collins (VC) =

Recipient of the Victoria Cross, born 1880

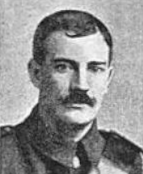
- Born: 10 September 1880; West Hatch, Somerset, England
- Died: 3 September 1951 (aged 70); Merthyr Tydfil, Mid Glamorgan, Wales
- Burial place: Pant Cemetery, Merthyr Tydfil
- Military career
- Allegiance: United Kingdom
- Branch: British Army
- Service years: 1895–1907, 1915–1919
- Rank: Sergeant
- Units: Royal Welch Fusiliers
- Conflicts: Second Boer War; First World War: Gallipoli Campaign; Battle of Beersheba
- Awards: Victoria Cross; Distinguished Conduct Medal; Mentioned in dispatches

John Collins VC, DCM (10 September 1880 – 3 September 1951) was a recipient of the Victoria Cross, the highest and most prestigious award for gallantry in the face of the enemy that can be awarded to British and Commonwealth forces.

== Biography ==
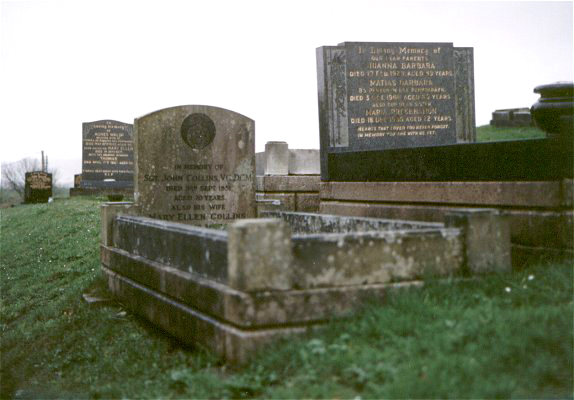
John Collins grave, Pant Cemetery

Born in West Hatch, Somerset, his family moved to Merthyr Tydfil, South Wales, when he was 10 years old.

He enlisted in the Royal Horse Artillery in 1895 and served in South Africa during the Boer War and was one of the first troops to enter Ladysmith with the relief column. He also saw service in India. Although his war records were destroyed during the London Blitz of 1940, it is likely that he left the Army in 1907, when he worked as a collier at the Bedlinog Colliery.

He enlisted in the newly formed Welsh Horse Yeomanry in 1915 and the regiment was sent to Gallipoli (it had been converted to an infantry regiment) and carried out mining and sapping duties in the area around Hill 60. They were evacuated to Egypt as part of the last British troops to leave the peninsula. The Welsh Horse provided part of the garrison in the Libyan desert until January 1917, when they were merged with the 1/1 Montgomeryshire Yeomanry and then formed the 25th Battalion, The Royal Welch Fusiliers, British Army. During the last week of October, the 25 RWF were positioned on the right of the 74 Division, in the centre of the line where, along with 24 RWF they were to be the brigade's two attacking battalions. At this time, Collins was 37 years old, and an acting corporal when the following deed took place for which he was awarded the Victoria Cross.

On 31 October 1917, during the Battle of Beersheba at Wadi Saba, Beersheba, Palestine, when, after deployment, prior to an attack, his battalion was forced to lie out in the open under heavy shell and machine-gun fire which caused many casualties. Corporal Collins repeatedly went out under heavy fire and brought back many wounded to cover, thus saving many lives. In subsequent operations throughout the day, he was conspicuous in rallying and leading his command. He led the final assault with the utmost skill in spite of heavy fire at close range and uncut wire. He bayoneted 15 of the enemy and with a Lewis gun section, pressed on beyond the objective and covered the reorganization and consolidation most effectively although isolated and under fire from snipers and guns.

He later achieved the rank of sergeant and was discharged in 1919.

He was decorated with the Victoria Cross by HM King George V at Buckingham Palace on 1 June 1918. His Victoria Cross is displayed at the Royal Welch Fusiliers Museum, Caernarfon Castle, Gwynedd, Wales, where there is a plaque in the entrance to his memory. A painting of Collins by G Ethridge is on display at Cyfarthfa Castle Museum & Art Gallery.
