= Charles Edensor Heathcote =

Brigadier-General Charles Edensor Heathcote CB CMG DSO
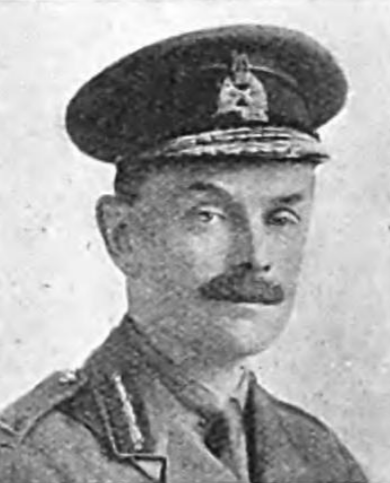
- Born: 8 April 1875; Cowes, Isle of Wight
- Died: 6 September 1947 (aged 72); Sussex, England
- Military career
- Allegiance: United Kingdom
- Branch: British Army
- Service years: 1894–1932
- Rank: Brigadier-General
- Units: King's Own Yorkshire Light Infantry, Royal West African Frontier Force, Royal Lincolnshire Regiment, Royal Leicestershire Regiment
- Conflicts: First World War
- Awards: CB, CMG, DSO

Brigadier-General Charles Edensor Heathcote, CB, CMG, DSO (8 April 1875 – 6 September 1947) was a senior British Army officer during the First World War.

== Early life ==
Born on 8 April 1875, Charles Edensor Heathcote was educated at Bedford School.

== Early military career ==
He received his first commission as a Second Lieutenant in the King's Own Yorkshire Light Infantry (KOYLI) in March 1894. He was promoted to the rank of lieutenant on 30 January 1898. Two years later, he was in January 1900 appointed to a staff position as Superintendent of Gymnasia at Malta, and promoted the rank of captain on 23 April 1900. He was back with his regiment in January 1903. He subsequently served with the Royal West African Frontier Force, between 1904 and 1909, where he took part in the Onitsha Hinterland Expedition, between 1904 and 1905, and further operations in the Southern Nigeria Protectorate.

He was promoted to the rank of major in November 1913.

== First World War ==
He served during the First World War, between 1914 and 1918. He departed for France with the 2nd Battalion, KOYLI, on 31 October 1914, serving as a company commander and rising to be commanding officer of the battalion. He served at the Battle of Mons, the Battle of Le Cateau, the First Battle of the Marne, the First Battle of the Aisne, at the First Battle of Ypres, and was wounded at Battle of Messines.

He rejoined the 2nd KOYLI at the Front in April 1915, fought in the Second Battle of Ypres, and was CO of the battalion again between May and September.

In September 1915, Heathcote became CO of the 4th Battalion, Lincolnshire Regiment (later the Royal Lincolnshire Regiment), fighting at the Battle of Loos and during the Battle of the Hohenzollern Redoubt. He served in Egypt as part of the Suez Canal Defence Force, and in France at the Battle of Vimy Ridge.

In May 1916, when he was appointed as brigadier general and given command of the 7th Infantry Brigade, leading the brigade through further Vimy operations, and at the Battle of the Somme. He was next given command of the 9th (Service) Battalion, KOYLI, with whom he fought in the Somme operations in September 1916, when he was wounded. Upon his return to the Front in early 1917, Heathcote was appointed to command the 7th Battalion, Royal Leicestershire Regiment, and fought with it throughout the Battle of Arras.

In May 1917, he went to Egypt in order to command the 231st Infantry Brigade, which he commanded during the Battle of Beersheba and the Battle of Hareira and Sheria, operations to the west of Jerusalem, and in the subsequent capture of Jerusalem, as well as in fighting on the Nablus Road. He then took the 231st Brigade to the Western Front, where it went into battle south of Merville, Nord, in September 1918. From then until the end of hostilities in November 1918, the brigade was constantly in action, participating in the Second Battle of the Somme and the attack on the Hindenburg Line, east of Ronssoy and Templeux-le-Guérard, in addition to the fighting which resulted in the re-occupation of the Aubers Ridge and Lille, and the fall of Tournai.

== Postwar and final years ==
Returning to normal regimental duties in the early 1920s, he again commanded the 2nd Battalion, King's Own Yorkshire Light Infantry in India, between 1922 and 1924, was Brigadier of the 1st Rhine Brigade, with the British Army of the Rhine, between 1928 and 1929, ending his career as Brigadier in command of the 15th Brigade at York, between 1929 and 1932.

Brigadier General Charles Edensor Heathcote was invested as a Companion of the Distinguished Service Order in 1915, as a Companion of the Order of St Michael and St George in 1918, and as a Companion of the Order of the Bath in 1919. He retired from the British Army in 1932. In retirement, he served on Uckfield Rural District Council, representing the village of Forest Row, where he lived. He died in Sussex on 6 September 1947, aged 72.
