= Brook Street drill hall, Welshpool =

Brook Street drill hall
- Welshpool, Wales
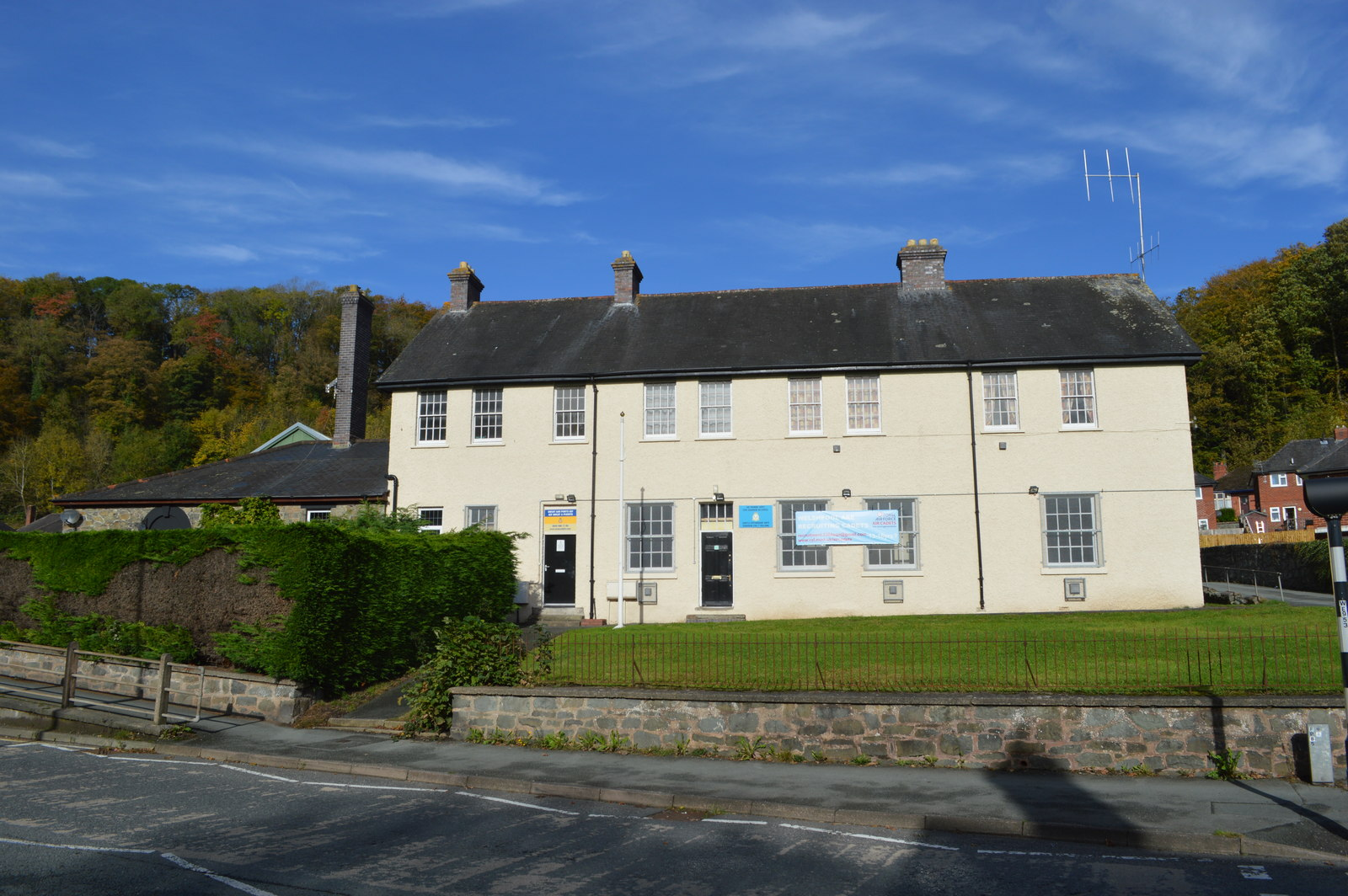
- Brook Street drill hall

Site information
- Type: Drill hall

Location
- Location in Powys
- Coordinates: 52.66198°N 3.15330°W

Site history
- Built: Mid 19th century
- Built for: War Office
- In use: Mid 19th century – Present

The Brook Street drill hall is a military installation in Welshpool.

== History ==
An armoury was established at Welshpool in the mid-19th century. It became the headquarters of the Montgomeryshire Rifle Volunteers in 1861 and, although the regiment evolved to become 7th (Merioneth and Montgomery) Battalion, the Royal Welch Fusiliers with its headquarters at Newtown in 1908, the battalion still maintained a presence at Welshpool in the form of C Company.

Meanwhile, the building had also become the headquarters of the Montgomeryshire Yeomanry in the late 19th century. The regiment was mobilised at the drill hall in August 1914 before being deployed to the Middle East. After the war, the yeomanry were absorbed by the 7th (Merioneth and Montgomery) Battalion, the Royal Welch Fusiliers.

Following the Second World War and the conversion of the battalion to artillery, the drill hall was decommissioned; it was converted into a sports centre in 1980 but it is still used as a training facility by the air cadets.
