= Berlencourt-le-Cauroy =

- Commune
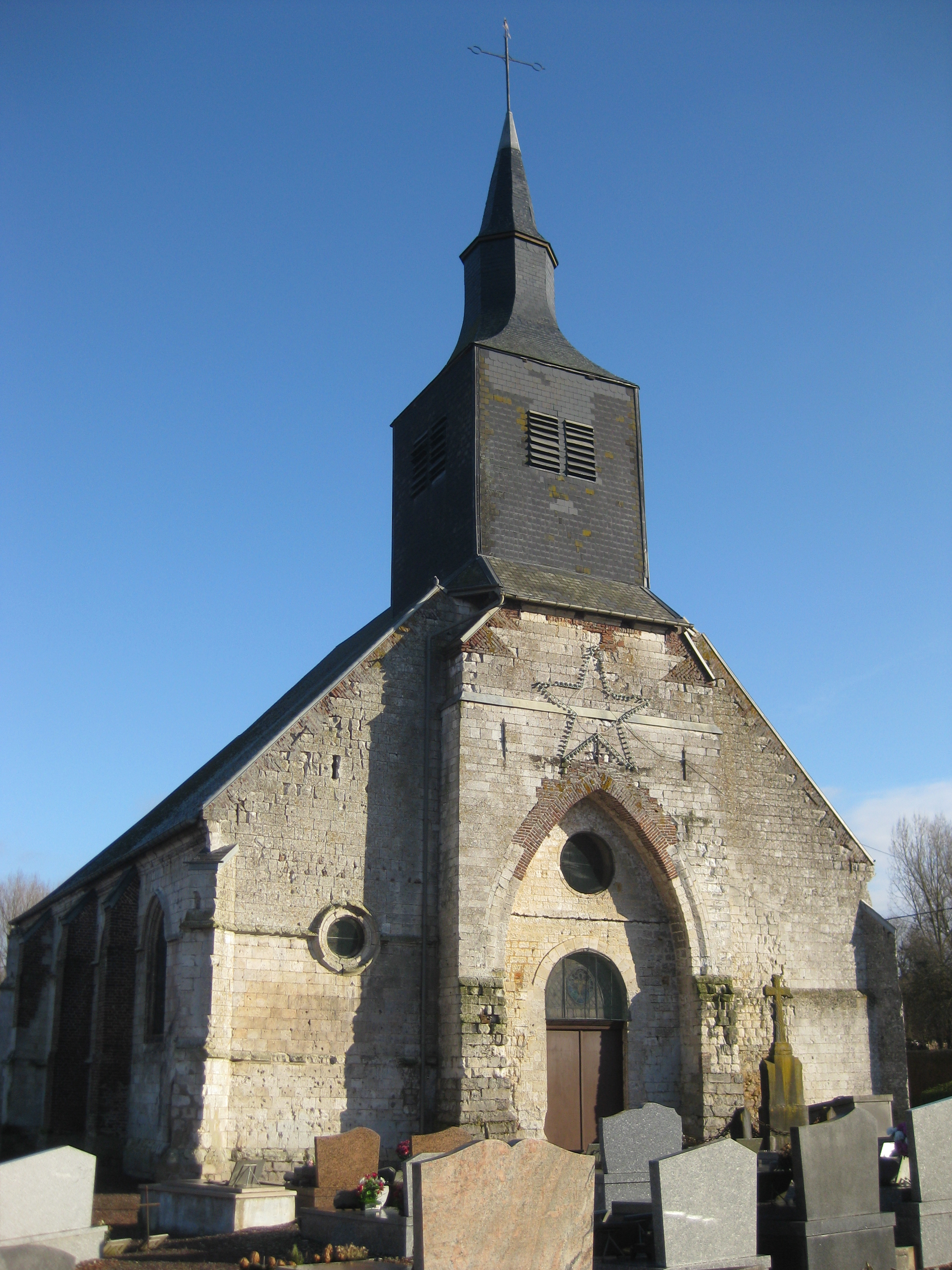
- The church of Berlencourt-le-Cauroy
- Location of Berlencourt-le-Cauroy
- Location within France Location within Hauts-de-France
- Coordinates: 50°16′56″N 2°25′36″E
- Country: France
- Region: Hauts-de-France
- Department: Pas-de-Calais
- Arrondissement: Arras
- Canton: Avesnes-le-Comte
- Intercommunality: CC Campagnes de l'Artois

Government
  - Mayor (2020–2026): Christian Delambre
- Area^{1}: 7.48 km^{2} (2.89 sq mi)
- Elevation: 110 m (360 ft)
- Highest elevation: 151 m (495 ft)
- Lowest elevation: 87 m (285 ft)
- Population (2023): 277
  - Density: 37.0/km^{2} (95.9/sq mi)
- Time zone: UTC+01:00 (CET)
  - Summer (DST): UTC+02:00 (CEST)
- INSEE/Postal code: 62111 /62810
- ^{1} French Land Register data, which excludes lakes, ponds, glaciers > 1 km^{2} (0.386 sq mi or 247 acres) and river estuaries.

Berlencourt-le-Cauroy (French pronunciation: [bɛʁlɑ̃kuʁ lə koʁwa]; Picard: Berlincourt-l’Cauroy) is a commune in the Pas-de-Calais department in the Hauts-de-France region in northern France.

== Geography ==
A village located 16 miles (26 km) west of Arras on the D79 road, in the valley of the river Canche.

== Population ==
Historical population
Year	Pop.	±% p.a.
1968	266	—
1975	246	−1.11%
1982	241	−0.29%
1990	254	+0.66%
1999	265	+0.47%
2007	272	+0.33%
2012	298	+1.84%
2017	275	−1.59%
2023	277	+0.12%
Source: INSEE

== Sights ==
- Vestiges of a 13th-century château.
- The Château du Cauroy, built in 1680.
- The eighteenth century Château of Ignaucourt.
- The church of Saint-Sulpice, dating from the seventeenth century.
- The church of Saint-Pierre, dating from the nineteenth century.

== See also ==
- Communes of the Pas-de-Calais department
