= Battle of Tell 'Asur =

1918 battle

- Part of the Middle Eastern theatre of World War I
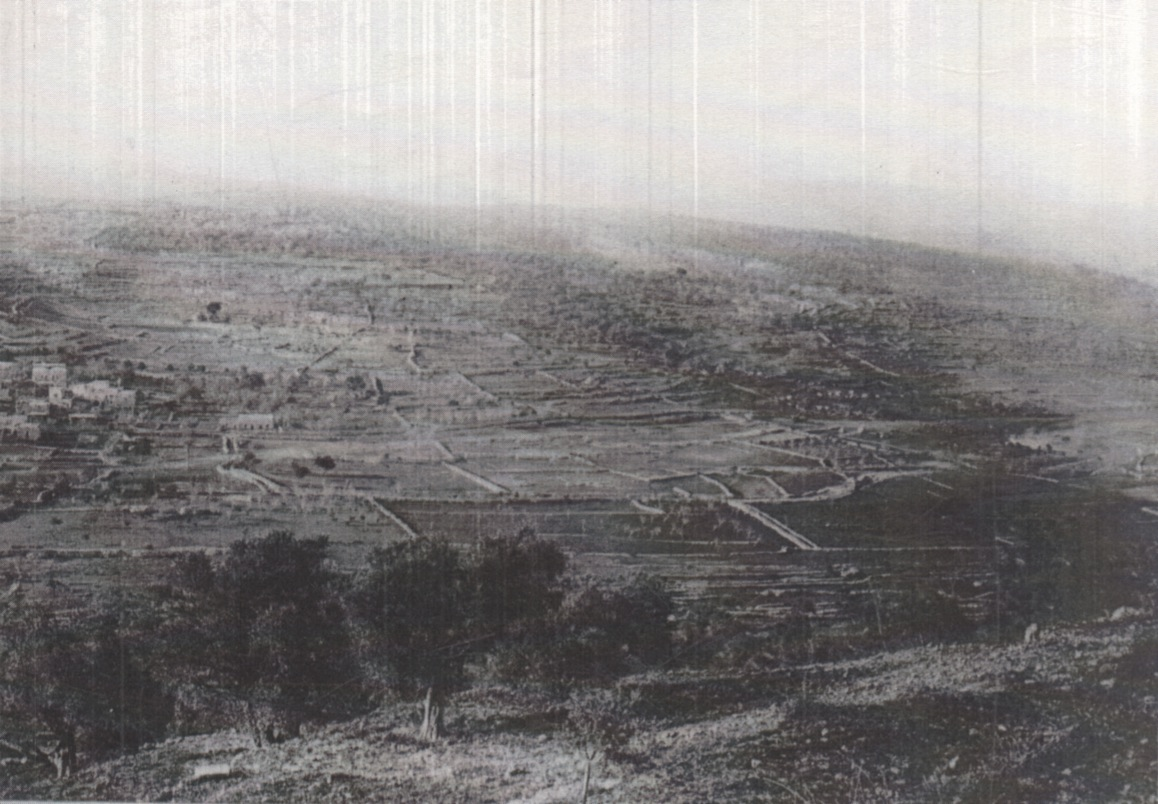
- Jerusalem to Nablus Road shows Ain Sinia on left and Yebrud on right. Photo taken by the 230th Brigade, 74th Division.
Date	8–12 March 1918
Location	General attack along front line from the Mediterranean coast to western edge of Jordan Valley.
Result	British Empire victory

Belligerents
British Empire: United Kingdom; Australia	Ottoman Empire; German Empire

Commanders and leaders
(United Kingdom) Edmund Allenby (British Empire) Edward Bulfin (British Empire) Philip Chetwode	(Ottoman Empire) Fevzi Pasha (German Empire) Erich von Falkenhayn (German Empire) Liman von Sanders

Units involved
XX Corps; XXI Corps; 1st Light Horse Brigade	Seventh Army; Eighth Army

The Battle of Tell 'Asur, also known as the actions of Tel Asur or the Battle of Turmus 'Aya, took place 8–12 March 1918, after the decisive victory at the Battle of Jerusalem and the Capture of Jericho during the Sinai and Palestine Campaign of World War I. Fighting took place over an area which extended from the Mediterranean to Abu Tellul and Mussallabeh on the edge of the Jordan Valley.

After the capture of Jericho by the Egyptian Expeditionary Force (EEF) in February 1918 the occupation of the Jordan Valley began. However, the captured territory was not sufficiently broad to provide a strong enough base for the planned Transjordan operations. The EEF's front line was successfully pushed northwards following attacks by the XX and XXI Corps against the Ottoman Seventh Army and Eighth Army. At the end of March the First Transjordan attack on Amman was launched to be followed the next month by the Second Transjordan attack on Shunet Nimrin and Es Salt.

== Background ==
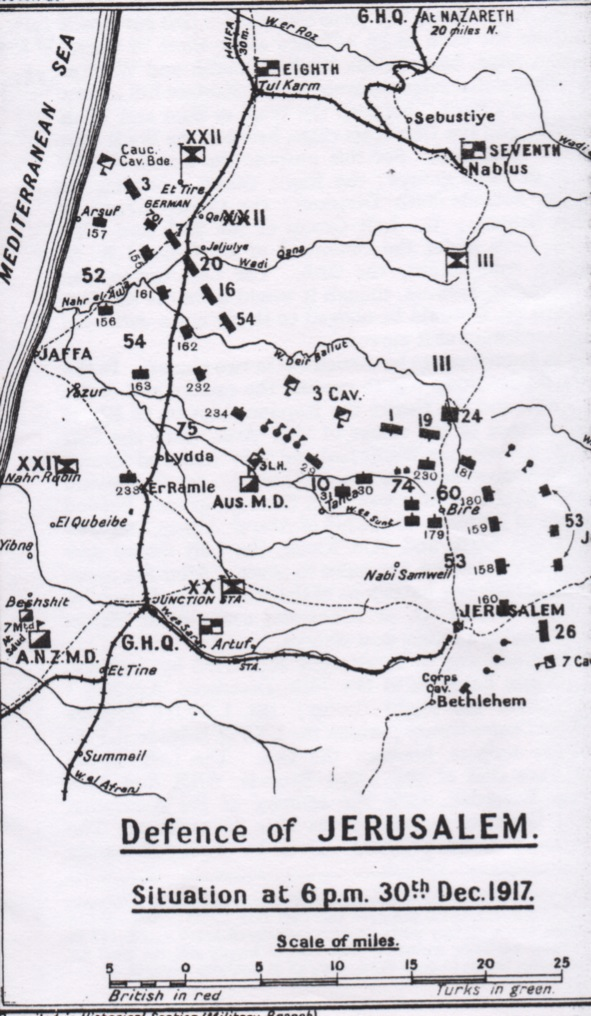
Falls Sketch Map 21 – position of the front line before the capture of Jericho

General Edmund Allenby's right flank was secure but was not sufficiently broad to support the planned operations across the Jordan to the Hedjaz railway. During these operations a general advance on a front of 14–26 miles (23–42 km) and up to a maximum of 5–7 miles (8.0–11.3 km) in depth by both the XX and XXI Corps pushed Ottoman forces north from the River Auja on the Mediterranean coast, from Abu Tellul and Mussallabeh on the edge of the Jordan Valley and up the Jerusalem to Nablus road capturing Ras el Ain.

The objectives of the XX Corps were Kh. el Beiyudat and Abu Telul in the Jordan Valley north of the Wadi el Auja and to the west astride the Jerusalem to Nablus road, the road running from Mughaiyrir through Sinjil and Jiljliya (Gilgal) to Abwein. The XXI Corps' right was to advance to Deir Ballut and Majdal Yaba 4.5 miles (7.2 km) north of its present position at Et Tire.

== Prelude ==
Some preliminary operations mainly to gain better gun positions commenced on the night of 2 March when infantry from the 53rd (Welsh) Division advanced west of the Nablus road on a 3 miles (4.8 km) front from north-west of Rammun to south-west of Bir ez Zeit and the 10th (Irish) Division advanced to Beit Ello 5 miles (8.0 km) west of Bir ez Zeit. On the night of 6 March 53rd (Welsh) Division occupied the village of Taiyibe and the artillery was then brought up. (Note: The names of the infantry divisions, brigades and battalions and some other units have, in many cases, been changed so they no longer reflect the names of these units as they appear in the sources quoted.)

== Battle ==
=== Against the Ottoman Seventh Army ===
Tell 'Asur operations of 230th Brigade 74th Division

The main advance by infantry from the XX Corps, began during the night of 8 March, by the 53rd (Welsh) Division with the 1st Light Horse Brigade (probably operating dismounted in the rough terrain — see map opposite), the 74th (Yeomanry) Division and the 10th (Irish) Division. On the right flank the 181st Brigade, 60th (2/2nd London) Division, which took part on the first day only, was to secure the line of the Wadi el Auja in and just above the Jordan Valley and guard it and the open right flank of the 53rd (Welsh) Division against an attack. The 60th (2/2nd London) Division pushed Ottoman units back from high ground on the north bank of the Wadi Auja, well beyond the valuable water supply in the river. The XX Corps began its advance during the night of 8 March at the same time as the Ottoman XX Corps began to arrive on the Auja. The wadi was 20 yards (18 m) across but only 3 feet (0.91 m) deep and the 2/22nd and 2/21st Battalion, London Regiment crossed the wadi in the plain without incident before 05:00. The 2/24th and 2/23rd Battalions, London Regiment in the hills had difficulties and a gap of 5 miles (8.0 km) developed where an Ottoman division had given the defences an unexpected strength.

Meanwhile, infantry from the 53rd, 74th and 10th Divisions advanced north up both sides of the Jerusalem to Nablus road from Kefr Malik to Nebi Saleh cutting off all tracks and roads leading to the lower Jordan Valley. The 53rd (Welsh) Division's objective; the capture of Tell 'Asur, was assigned to the 158th Brigade. The Tell was a very valuable observation post with views extending north to the hills of Galilee with Mount Hermon in the background 90 miles (140 km) away, in the east and south-east to Gilead, Moab and most of the Dead Sea, in the south over the Mount of Olives to the heights of Hebron and west to the Mediterranean from south of Jaffa to north of Caesarea. It was captured by the 5th Battalion, Royal Welch Fusiliers about 09:30 after a heavy bombardment by the 91st Heavy Battery but the position was far from secure being subjected to a successful counter-attack shortly after, but the 6th Battalion, Royal Welch Fusiliers, drove them off. Four unsuccessful attempts by Ottoman forces were made to regain this hill.

Infantry from the 74th (Yeomanry) Division's attack was made astride the Jerusalem to Nablus road; the 231st Brigade on the right moving towards Mezra ash Sherqiye 1.5 miles (2.4 km) north north west of Tell 'Asur. But the difficult night advance was further complicated by the terrain and Ottoman machine guns and despite reinforcements being brought forward, the infantry were held up later in the day by the cavernous gorge of the Wadi el Jib.

Operating in two groups; the 10th (Irish) Division's right attacked Atara and Ajul and the left attacked from Deir es Sudan to Nabi Salih. After a late start due to fog rapid advances were made and during the following night the advance continued on most of the front. The bridge over the Wadi el Jib was found to be intact and the top of the cliff was won just before dawn. Daylight found them on the lower slopes of the hills while Ottoman machine gun defenders made determined stands.

During these operations the infantry advanced up and down precipitous cliffs and through deep gorges with every Ottoman machine gun carefully placed in strong defensive positions. These had to be located by careful reconnaissance on foot as the country was very rough and due to the low cloud and mist aerial reconnaissance could not be used. Artillery was also severely hampered by the rough terrain making it virtually impossible to produce effective artillery fire support.

=== Against the Ottoman Eighth Army ===
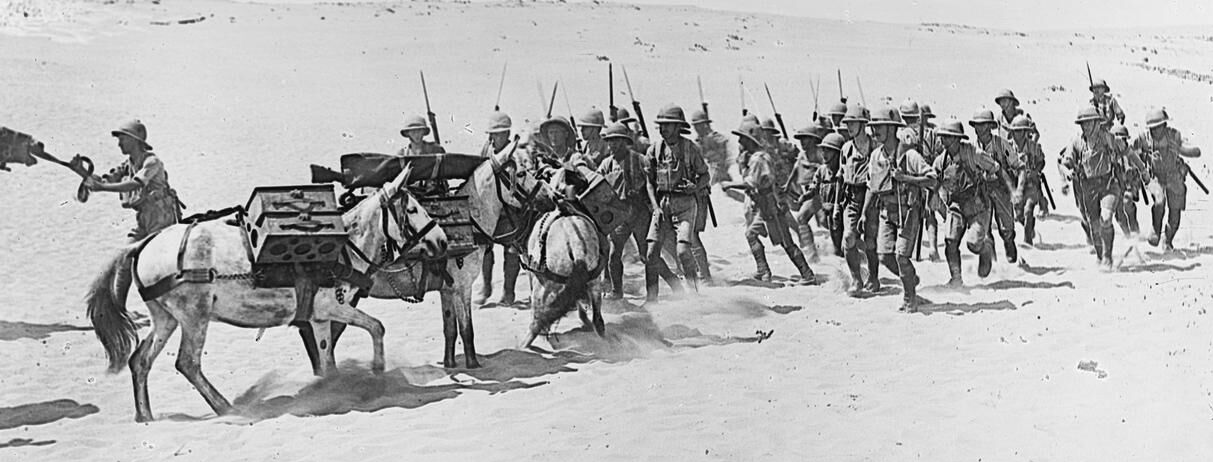
Lewis Gun Section of the 2nd Battalion, Leicestershire Regiment (7th Indian Division) with their mules at Arsuf Coastal Sector, summer 1918

On the plain the operations of the XXI Corps were carried out without any of the difficulties suffered by the XX Corps. The XXI Corps moved its right forward from the Wadi Deir Ballut to Ras el Ain and secured a commanding position near Abu Tellul and Musallabeh which overlooks the Jordan Valley and the Beisan to Jericho road.

Their final objective was a line north of the Wadi Deir Ballut (which becomes the Wadi el Jib) and the Wadi Abu Lejja where it enters the Nahr el Auja north of Mulebbis an advance of 4.5 miles (7.2 km). After the passage of the Nahr el Auja an advance had reached El Haram near ancient Arsuf making it possible to take the Ottoman positions in enfilade. The attack was carried out by infantry from the 232nd Brigade and 234th Brigade of the 75th Division and the 162nd Brigade of the 54th (East Anglian) Division closely supported by artillery in a creeping barrage. (Note: Creeping barrages were also successfully employed on the maritime plain by the XXI Corps, to which both the 54th and 75th Divisions transferred, during the morning attack of 19 September 1918. [Falls 1930 Vol. 2 pp. 470–1]) One section followed close behind the infantry leaving the rest of the battery in action and as soon as the leading section was able to open fire the four other guns moved forward to join it. Deir el Ballut was taken about at 14:00 on 10 March and by 11:00 on 11 March all the ground to the south of the Wadi had been evacuated by the Ottoman forces leaving behind 112 soldiers who were taken prisoner and about 40 dead at a cost to the two infantry divisions of 104 casualties.

== Aftermath ==
The final line captured was found to be overlooked on all sides so a slight retirement to the heights just to the south was made and the positions consolidated. Elsewhere objectives had not all been gained but the depth of the advance in the centre was 5 miles (8.0 km) over a 14-mile (23 km) front at a cost of over 1,300 casualties; only 169 prisoners had been captured.

The new line established by these infantry corps remained almost the same for six months; until the general advance in September 1918. The success of these infantry operations provided a sufficiently large base to support the Transjordan operations which began at the end of the month with the first Transjordan attack on Amman.

== Bibliography ==
- Blenkinsop, Layton John; Rainey, John Wakefield, eds. (1925). History of the Great War Based on Official Documents Veterinary Services. London: H.M. Stationers. OCLC 460717714.
- Bruce, Anthony (2002). The Last Crusade: The Palestine Campaign in the First World War. London: John Murray. ISBN 978-0-7195-5432-2.
- Falls, Cyril (1930). Military Operations Egypt & Palestine from June 1917 to the End of the War. Official History of the Great War Based on Official Documents by Direction of the Historical Section of the Committee of Imperial Defence. Vol. 2 Part I. A. F. Becke (maps). London: HM Stationery Office. OCLC 644354483.
- Falls, Cyril (1930). Military Operations Egypt & Palestine from June 1917 to the End of the War. Official History of the Great War Based on Official Documents by Direction of the Historical Section of the Committee of Imperial Defence. Vol. 2 Part II. A. F. Becke (maps). London: H.M. Stationery Office. OCLC 256950972.
- Keogh, E. G.; Joan Graham (1955). Suez to Aleppo. Melbourne: Directorate of Military Training by Wilkie & Co. OCLC 220029983.
