= Battle of Épehy =

1918 battle of WWI

Coordinates: 50°00′N 3°07′E

- Part of the Hundred Days Offensive of World War I
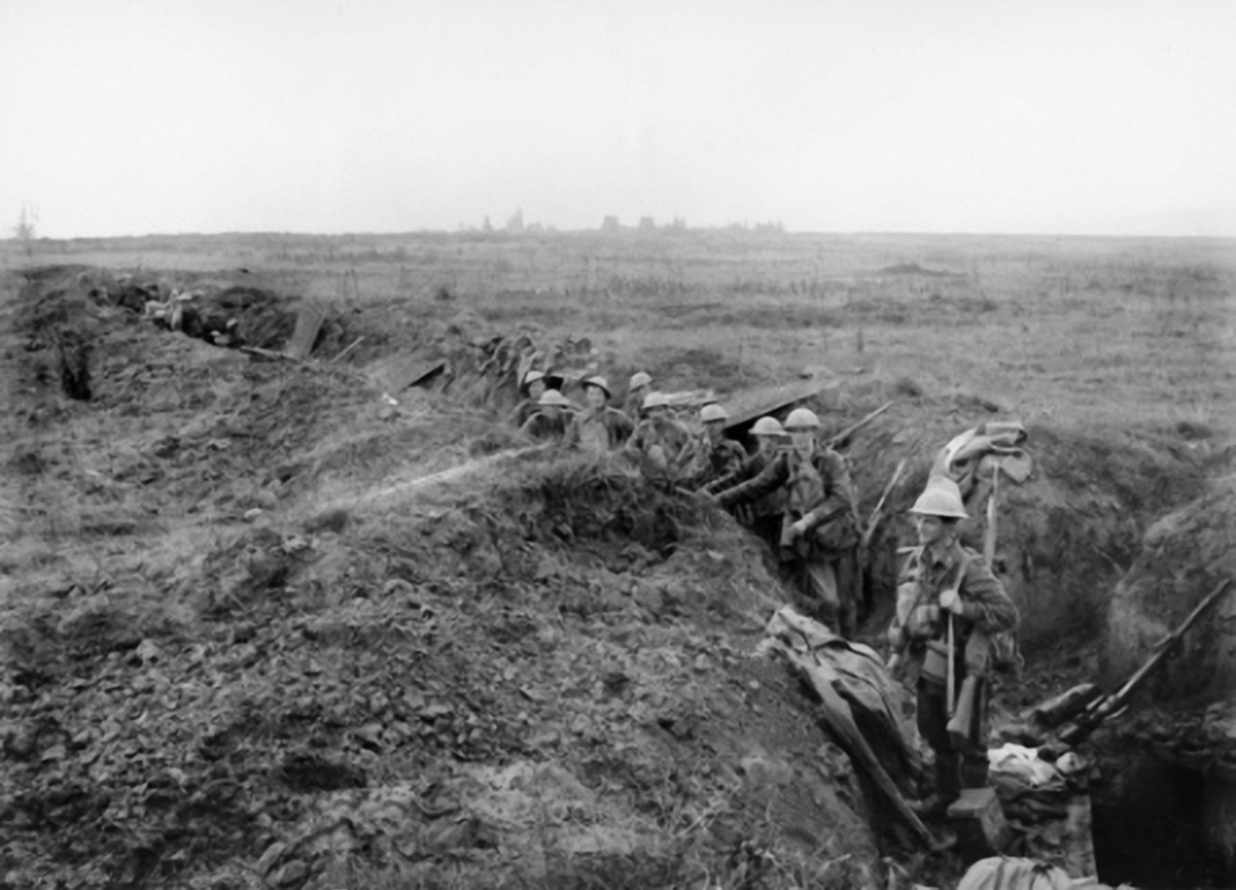
- The Western Front, 1918
Date	18 September 1918
Location	Épehy, France
Result	Allied victory

Belligerents
British Empire: United Kingdom; Australia; France	German Empire

Commanders and leaders
(United Kingdom of Great Britain and Ireland) Henry Rawlinson (United Kingdom of Great Britain and Ireland) Julian Byng (French Third Republic) Marie-Eugène Debeney	(German Empire) Georg von der Marwitz

Strength
12 divisions 1,500 artillery pieces	At least 6 divisions

Casualties and losses
Total: unknown (Australia) 1,260 men (265 killed, 1,059 wounded)	Total: unknown Captured: 11,750 men and 100 artillery pieces

The Battle of Épehy was fought during the First World War on 18 September 1918, involving the British Fourth Army under the command of General Henry Rawlinson against German outpost positions in front of the Hindenburg Line. The village of Épehy was captured on 18 September by the 12th (Eastern) Division.

== Prelude ==
Field Marshal Sir Douglas Haig, Commander-in-Chief (C-in-C) of the British Expeditionary Force (BEF) on the Western Front, was not eager to carry out any offensives, until the assault on the Hindenburg Line, influenced by mounting British losses from previous battles that year, over 600,000 casualties since March, 180,000 of them in the past six weeks. Rawlinson was kept reined in and advised by Haig to ensure his men were well rested for the eventual attack on the Line. When news arrived of the British Third Army's victory at the Battle of Havrincourt, Haig's mind was changed. On the day following the success at Havrincourt, 13 September, Haig approved Rawlinson's plan to clear German outpost positions on the high ground before the Hindenburg Line and preparations began.

== Battle ==
Very few tanks could be provided for the attack, so an artillery barrage would have to be relied upon to prepare the way. But in the interests of surprise, they would not be able to provide a preliminary bombardment. The 1,488 guns would instead fire concentration shots at zero hour and support the infantry with a creeping barrage; 300 machine-guns were also made available. All three corps of the Fourth Army were to take part, with V Corps of the Third Army on their left flank and on their right the French First Army (under Marie Eugène Debeney). The objective consisted of a fortified zone roughly 3 miles (4.8 km) deep and 20 miles (32 km) long, supported by subsidiary trenches and strong points. The German 2nd Army and 18th Army defended the area.

On 18 September at 5.20 am, the attack opened and the troops advanced. The promised French assistance did not arrive, resulting in limited success for IX Corps on that flank. On the left flank, III Corps also found difficulty when attacking the fortifications erected at "the Knoll", Quennemont and Guillemont farms, which were held determinedly by German troops, the village was however captured by the British 12th Eastern Division (7th Norfolk, 9th Essex and 1st Cambridge). In the centre, General John Monash's two Australian divisions achieved complete and dramatic success. The 1st Australian Division and the 4th Australian Division, had a strength of some 6,800 men and in the course of the day captured 4,243 prisoners, 76 guns, 300 machine-guns and 30 trench mortars. They took all their objectives and advanced to a distance of about 3 miles (4.8 km) on a 4 miles (6.4 km) front. The Australian casualties were 1,260 officers and men (265 killed, 1,057 wounded, 2 captured). The attack closed as an Allied victory, with 11,750 prisoners and 100 guns captured.

However, during the battle, all but one member of "D" Company of the 1st Australian Battalion refused to take part in an attack to help a neighbouring British unit. The protest was against the battalion being sent back into combat when it had been about to be relieved. On 21 September 119 members of the company were subsequently imprisoned for desertion; this was the AIF's largest incidence of "combat refusal" during the war and formed part of a general weakening in the force's discipline due to the stresses of prolonged combat. The charges of desertion in the face of the enemy (a crime that could mean execution by firing squad in World War I) were reduced to the lesser crime of being AWOL. All bar one soldier had their charges dropped after the armistice in November.

== Aftermath ==
Although Épehy was not a massive success, it signalled an unmistakable message that the Germans were weakening and it encouraged the Allies to take further action with the Battle of St. Quentin Canal, before the Germans could consolidate their positions. The failure of the III Corps to take their last objective – the outpost villages, would mean that the American forces would face a difficult task due to a hurried attack prior to the battle.

The Épehy Wood Farm Cemetery takes its name from the Ferme du Bois, a little to the east. Plots I and II were made by the 12th Division after the capture of the village, and contain the graves of officers and men who died in September 1918 (or, in a few instances, in April 1917 and March 1918). Plots III-VI were made after the Armistice when graves were brought in from the battlefields surrounding Épehy and from the smaller cemeteries of Deelish Valley Cemetery, Éphey, in the valley running from South-West to North-East a mile East of Épehy village which contained the graves of 158 soldiers from the United Kingdom (almost all of the 12th Division) who fell in September, 1918, Éphey New British Cemetery, on the South side of the village, which contained the graves of 100 soldiers from the United Kingdom who fell in August, 1917-March, 1918 and in September, 1918 and Éphey R.E. Cemetery, 150 yards North of the New British Cemetery which contained the graves of 31 soldiers from the United Kingdom who fell in April-December, 1917, and of whom 11 belonged to the 429th Field Company, Royal Engineers. The Épehy Wood Farm Cemetery now contains 997 burials and commemorations of the First World War. 235 of the burials are unidentified but there are additional special memorials to 29 casualties known or believed to be buried among them, and to two casualties buried in Épehy New British Cemetery, whose graves could not be found when that cemetery was concentrated. The cemetery was designed by Sir Herbert Baker.

== Notes ==
1. – The British and Australian official histories both state an Australian strength of 6,800 infantry. Major-General Sir Archibald Montgomery's The Story of the Fourth Army, written apparently with access to British Army documents states different figures; 5,902 Australian infantry engaged, 1,700 prisoners taken, 87 guns captured and casualties of 1,022 men. The former figure has been used in this article but the difference should be noted. C. E. W. Bean: Volume VI – The Australian Imperial Force in France during the Allied Offensive, 1918 lists 5,822 infantry engaged but uses the figure of 6,800 soldiers (as the later figure includes the various battalion and brigade headquarters staff).
