= Glamorganshire Royal Horse Artillery =

Former British Army horse artillery battery

Glamorganshire Royal Horse Artillery (T.F.) 1/1st Glamorganshire RHA (T.F.)
- Active: 26 May 1908 – 1919
- Country: United Kingdom
- Branch: British Army
- Type: Artillery
- Size: Battery
- Part of: South Wales Mounted Brigade; CCXCIII Brigade, RFA (T.F.)
- peacetime HQ: Port Talbot
- Equipment: Ordnance QF 15-pounder Ordnance QF 18-pounder
- Engagements: First World War Western Front

The Glamorganshire Royal Horse Artillery was a Territorial Force Royal Horse Artillery battery that was formed in Glamorganshire in 1908. It saw active service during the First World War on the Western Front in 1917 and 1918 as part of an Army Field Artillery Brigade. A second line battery, 2/1st Glamorganshire RHA, served in England and Ireland before being broken up in January 1917. Glamorganshire RHA was not reconstituted in the post-war Territorial Force.

== History ==
=== Formation ===
The Territorial Force (TF) was formed on 1 April 1908 following the enactment of the Territorial and Reserve Forces Act 1907 (7 Edw.7, c.9), which combined and re-organised the old Volunteer Force, the Honourable Artillery Company and the Yeomanry. On formation, the TF contained 14 infantry divisions and 14 mounted yeomanry brigades. Each yeomanry brigade included a horse artillery battery and an ammunition column.

On 18 March 1908, Glamorganshire Royal Horse Artillery (Territorial Force) was proposed as a new unit and it was recognized by the Army Council on 26 May 1908; the ammunition column was recognized on 30 September 1908. The unit consisted of

Battery HQ at Port Talbot
Glamorganshire Battery at Port Talbot
South Wales Brigade Ammunition Column also at Port Talbot

Some of the personnel for the new unit came from the 2nd Volunteer Battalion Welsh Regiment based in Cardiff, originally raised as Rifle Volunteers in 1859, some of whom had seen active service during the Second Boer War. (Other members of this battalion joined the 2nd Welsh Brigade, Royal Field Artillery, the remainder formed the 7th (Cyclist) Battalion, Welsh Regiment.)

The battery was equipped with four Ehrhardt 15-pounder guns and allocated as artillery support to the South Wales Mounted Brigade.

=== First World War ===
In accordance with the Territorial and Reserve Forces Act 1907 (7 Edw.7, c.9), which brought the Territorial Force into being, the TF was intended to be a home defence force for service during wartime and members could not be compelled to serve outside the country. However, on the outbreak of war on 4 August 1914, many members volunteered for Imperial Service. Therefore, TF units were split into 1st Line (liable for overseas service) and 2nd Line (home service for those unable or unwilling to serve overseas) units. 2nd Line units performed the home defence role, although in fact most of these were also posted abroad in due course.

==== 1/1st Glamorganshire ====
The 1st Line battery was embodied with the South Wales Mounted Brigade on 4 August 1914 at the outbreak of the First World War. The brigade assembled at Hereford and moved to East Anglia by the end of August 1914. It joined the 1st Mounted Division in August 1914, replacing 1st South Midland Mounted Brigade which moved to 2nd Mounted Division.

In December 1915, the battery was re-equipped with four 18 pounders. In March 1916, the South Wales Mounted Brigade (without the battery) was dismounted and left for Egypt. The brigade was replaced in the 1st Mounted Division by 2/1st Eastern Mounted Brigade and the battery remained with the division until August 1916.

2/IV London (Howitzer) Brigade, (Note: The basic organic unit of the Royal Artillery was, and is, the Battery. When grouped together they formed brigades, in the same way that infantry battalions or cavalry regiments were grouped together in brigades. At the outbreak of the First World War, a field artillery brigade of headquarters (4 officers, 37 other ranks), three batteries (5 and 193 each), and a brigade ammunition column (4 and 154) had a total strength just under 800 so was broadly comparable to an infantry battalion (just over 1,000) or a cavalry regiment (about 550). Like an infantry battalion, an artillery brigade was usually commanded by a Lieutenant-Colonel. Artillery brigades were redesignated as regiments in 1938. Note that the battery strength refers to a battery of six guns; a four-gun battery would be about two thirds of this.) RFA (T.F.) of 58th (2/1st London) Division was broken up in July 1916 when it batteries were posted to 2/I and 2/II London Brigades, RFA (T.F.) (that is, before the field artillery brigades of the Territorial Force divisions were numbered in a single sequence). The brigade was reformed for 58th Division in August 1916 as CCXCIII Brigade, RFA with two gun batteries provided by 1/1st Shropshire RHA (A/CCXCIII Battery) and 1/1st Glamorganshire RHA (B/CCXCIII Battery) and two howitzer batteries (C(H) and D(H) of four 4.5" howitzers each). The Brigade Ammunition Column had been redundant since the South Wales Mounted Brigade had left, so the men were transferred to the 58th Divisional Trench Mortar Brigade.

CCXCIII brigade landed at Le Havre on 22 January 1917. On 6 February 1917, D(H) Battery was split between D(H)/CCXC Battery and D(H)/CCXCI Battery; the remainder of the brigade became CCXCIII Army Field Artillery Brigade, RFA, (Note: Army Field Artillery Brigades were artillery brigades that were excess to the needs of the divisions, withdrawn to form an artillery reserve.) now with two batteries of six 18 pounders and one of four 4.5" howitzers.

At the Armistice, the battery (six 18 pounders) was still with CCXCIII Army Brigade, RFA serving as Army Troops with the First Army.

==== 2/1st Glamorganshire ====
2/1st Glamorganshire RHA (T.F.)
- Active: 1914 – January 1917
- Country: United Kingdom
- Branch: British Army
- Type: Artillery
- Size: Battery
- Part of: 2/1st South Wales Mounted Brigade; CCXCVII Brigade, RFA (T.F.); CCXCVIII Brigade, RFA (T.F.)
- Equipment: Ordnance QF 15-pounder Ordnance QF 18-pounder
- Service: First World War

Glamorganshire RHA formed a 2nd line, 2/1st Glamorganshire Battery, RHA, in 1915.

The pre-war Territorial Force infantry divisions were generally (Note: 51st (Highland) Division was exceptional in that it had three field and one mountain artillery brigade.) supported by four field artillery brigades. These were numbered I, II, III and IV within each division and consisted of three gun brigades (each of three batteries, equipped with four 15-pounder guns) and a howitzer brigade (two batteries of four 5" howitzers). Artillery for 2nd Line divisions were formed in a similar manner, with a fractional designation, for example the 2/III North Midland Brigade, RFA (with 2/4th, 2/5th and 2/6th Staffordshire Batteries, RFA) for 59th (2nd North Midland) Division. Territorial Force artillery brigades were later numbered in a consecutive sequence, and batteries lettered, so for the above example, CCXCVII Brigade, RFA with A, B and C batteries.

The battery, equipped with four 18 pounders, joined CCXCVII Brigade, RFA (former 2/III North Midland Brigade) in 59th (2nd North Midland) Division in Ireland in early May 1916 and became D/CCXCVII Battery. On 10 July 1916, the battery transferred to CCXCVIII Brigade, RFA (former 2/IV North Midland Brigade) as C/CCXCVIII Battery. At this point, CCXCVIII Brigade consisted of three 2nd Line RHA batteries: 2/1st Hampshire as A Battery, 2/1st Essex as B Battery and 2/1st Glamorganshire as C Battery.

In January 1917, the division returned to England. Before leaving Ireland, the battery was broken up: one section (Note: A Subsection consisted of a single gun and limber drawn by six horses (with three drivers), eight gunners (riding on the limber or mounted on their own horses), and an ammunition wagon also drawn by six horses (with three drivers). Two Subsections formed a Section and in a six gun battery these would be designated as Left, Centre and Right Sections.) joined A/CCXCVIII Battery (former 2/1st Hampshire Battery, RHA) and the other joined B/CCXCVIII Battery (former 2/1st Essex Battery, RHA) to make them up to six 18 pounders each. (Note: Elsewhere, Becke says that 2/1st Glamorganshire RHA was renamed as 815th Battery, RFA and remained in the United Kingdom throughout the war.)

=== Post war ===
The battery not reconstituted in the Territorial Force in 1920.

== Memorial ==
The Glamorganshire RHA's wooden memorial board listing the 56 men who died in World War I, and their former commanding officer, Brevet Colonel T.J. David, DSO, OBE, TD, who died on 6 November 1926, is in St Mary's Church, Margam.

== See also ==
- List of Territorial Force horse artillery batteries 1908

== Bibliography ==
- Becke, Archibald F. (1936). Order of Battle of Divisions Part 2A. The Territorial Force Mounted Divisions and the 1st-Line Territorial Force Divisions (42–56). London: HMSO. OCLC 4405016.
- Becke, Archibald F. (1937). Order of Battle of Divisions Part 2B. The 2nd-Line Territorial Force Divisions (57th–69th) with The Home-Service Divisions (71st–73rd) and 74th and 75th Divisions. London: HMSO. OCLC 4405016.
- Clarke, Dale (2004). British Artillery 1914–19 Field Army Artillery. Vol. 94 of New Vanguard Series. Oxford: Osprey Publishing. ISBN 1-84176-688-7.
- Clarke, W.G. (1993). Horse Gunners: The Royal Horse Artillery, 200 Years of Panache and Professionalism. Woolwich: The Royal Artillery Institution. ISBN 09520762-0-9.
- Frederick, J.B.M. (1984). Lineage Book of British Land Forces 1660–1978. Wakefield, Yorkshire: Microform Academic Publishers. ISBN 1-85117-009-X.
- Norman E.H. Litchfield, The Territorial Artillery 1908–1988 (Their Lineage, Uniforms and Badges), Nottingham: Sherwood Press, 1992, ISBN 0-9508205-2-0.
- Rinaldi, Richard A (2008). Order of Battle of the British Army 1914. Ravi Rikhye. ISBN 978-0-97760728-0.
- Westlake, Ray (1992). British Territorial Units 1914–18. Osprey Publishing. ISBN 978-1-85532-168-7.
- Ray Westlake, Tracing the Rifle Volunteers, Barnsley: Pen and Sword, 2010, ISBN 978-1-84884-211-3.
- Order of Battle of the British Armies in France, November 11th, 1918. France: General Staff, GHQ. 1918.
