= List of divisions of the British Territorial Force 1914–1918 =

The Territorial Force was established on 1 April 1908 as a volunteer auxiliary to the British Army. It was formed by the amalgamation of the former auxiliary institutions of the Volunteer Force and the yeomanry. Designed primarily as a home defence force, its members could not be compelled to serve overseas unless they volunteered to do so. On the outbreak of the First World War in 1914, many did. The first units were deployed piecemeal in support of the regular army as it defended against the opening German offensive in Belgium and France in 1914. The first territorial divisions to be deployed were used to free up imperial garrisons overseas, but in 1915 they began to be deployed to the front lines on the Western Front and at Gallipoli. The pre-war territorial divisions were numbered in May 1915 in order of their deployment. As they were deployed, second-line divisions were raised to replace them at home, and in 1916 these began to be deployed to combat zones. By the end of the war in 1918, the Territorial Force had provided 28 divisions and 14 mounted brigades.

== Infantry divisions ==
Number	Name	Second-line	Recruitment Area	Notes	References
42nd	East Lancashire Division	66th (2nd East Lancashire) Division	Cumberland, part of Lancashire and Westmorland		
43rd	Wessex Division	45th (2nd Wessex) Division	Cornwall, Devon, Dorset, Hampshire, Somerset, Wiltshire		
44th	Home Counties Division	67th (2nd Home Counties) Division	Middlesex, Kent, Surrey and Sussex	Second-line division lost territorial association early 1918	
46th	North Midland Division	59th (2nd North Midland) Division	Derbyshire, Leicestershire, Lincolnshire, Nottinghamshire, Rutland and Staffordshire		
47th	2nd London Division	60th (2/2nd London) Division	County of London		
48th	South Midland Division	61st (2nd South Midland) Division	Berkshire, Buckinghamshire, Gloucestershire, Oxfordshire and Warwickshire		
49th	West Riding Division	62nd (2nd West Riding) Division	West Riding of Yorkshire		
50th	Northumbrian Division	63rd (2nd Northumbrian) Division	County Durham, Northumberland, East and North Ridings of Yorkshire	Second-line division broken up in July 1916	
51st	Highland Division	64th (2nd Highland) Division	Aberdeen and Dundee, the counties of Aberdeenshire, Argyllshire, Banffshire, Buteshire, Caithness, Clackmannanshire, Dunbartonshire, Elginshire, Fife, Forfarshire, Inverness-shire, Kinross-shire, Nairnshire, Renfrewshire, Shetland, Stirlingshire, Sutherland and part of Lanarkshire	Second-line division lost territorial association early 1918	
52nd	Lowland Division	65th (2nd Lowland) Division	Edinburgh and Glasgow, Counties of Berwickshire, Dumfriesshire, Haddingtonshire, Kirkcudbrightshire, Linlithgowshire, Midlothian, Peeblesshire, Selkirkshire, Wigtownshire and part of Lanarkshire	Second-line division broken up 18 March 1918	
53rd	Welsh Division	68th (2nd Welsh) Division	Wales, Monmouthshire, Cheshire, Herefordshire and Shropshire	Second-line division lost territorial association early 1918	
54th	East Anglian Division	69th (2nd East Anglian) Division	Bedfordshire, Cambridgeshire, Essex, Hertfordshire, Huntingdonshire, Norfolk, Northamptonshire and Suffolk	Second-line division lost territorial association early 1918	
55th	West Lancashire Division	57th (2nd West Lancashire) Division	Lancashire and Liverpool		
56th	1st London Division	58th (2/1st London) Division	City of London and County of London		

== Mounted units ==
The original mounted brigades were:

- Eastern Mounted Brigade
- Highland Mounted Brigade
- London Mounted Brigade
- Lowland Mounted Brigade
- North Midland Mounted Brigade
- Nottinghamshire and Derbyshire Mounted Brigade
- South Eastern Mounted Brigade
- 1st South Midland Mounted Brigade
- 2nd South Midland Mounted Brigade
- South Wales Mounted Brigade
- 1st South Western Mounted Brigade
- 2nd South Western Mounted Brigade
- Welsh Border Mounted Brigade
- Yorkshire Mounted Brigade

A number of yeomanry divisions were also formed:

Name	Formed	Theatre	Notes	References
1st Mounted Division	August 1914	Home defence	Became the 1st Cyclist Division in July 1916. Disbanded November 1916.	
2nd Mounted Division	September 1914	Gallipoli Campaign	Fought dismounted at Gallipoli. Disbanded January 1916.	
3rd Mounted Division	March 1915	Home defence	Formed as the second-line 2/2nd Mounted Division. Renamed to 3rd Mounted Division March 1916. Renamed to 1st Mounted Division July 1916. Renamed to Cyclist Division September 1917. Disbanded June 1919.	
4th Mounted Division	March 1916	Home defence	Renamed to 2nd Cyclist Division July 1916. Disbanded November 1916.	
Yeomanry Mounted Division	July 1917	Sinai and Palestine Campaign	Lost its yeomanry affiliation April 1918, becoming an Indian division and renamed to 1st Mounted Division.	
74th (Yeomanry) Division	April 1917	Sinai and Palestine Campaign; Western Front	Formed from dismounted yeomanry. Transferred to France May 1918. Disbanded July 1919.	

== Other divisions ==
Also considered divisions of the Territorial Force were:

- 71st, 72nd and 73rd Divisions – formed late 1916 as Home Service divisions; all broken up early 1918.
- 75th Division – mixed Territorial Force and Indian Army division formed in June 1917.

== Bibliography ==
- Becke, Major A. F. (2007). Order of Battle of Divisions, Part 2a & 2b: Territorial & Yeomanry Divisions. Uckfield, East Sussex: Naval & Military Press. ISBN 9781847347398.
- Beckett, Ian Frederick William (2004). A Nation in Arms. Barnsley, South Yorkshire: Pen & Sword Military. ISBN 9781844680238.
- Beckett, Ian Frederick William (2008). Territorials: A Century of Service. Plymouth: DRA Publishing. ISBN 9780955781315.
- Beckett, Ian Frederick William (2011). Britain's Part-Time Soldiers: The Amateur Military Tradition: 1558–1945. Barnsley, South Yorkshire: Pen & Sword Military. ISBN 9781848843950.
- Mitchinson, K. W. (2014). The Territorial Force at War, 1914–1916. London: Palgrave Macmillan. ISBN 9781137451590.
- Westlake, Ray (1991). British Territorial Units 1914–1918. Oxford: Osprey Publishing. ISBN 9781855321687.
