= Shropshire Royal Horse Artillery =

Former British Army horse artillery battery

Shropshire Royal Horse Artillery (T.F.) 1/1st Shropshire RHA (T.F.)
- Active: 7 May 1908 – 1919
- Country: United Kingdom
- Branch: British Army
- Type: Artillery
- Size: Battery
- Part of: Welsh Border Mounted Brigade; CCXCIII Brigade, RFA (T.F.)
- peacetime HQ: Shrewsbury
- Equipment: Ordnance QF 15-pounder Ordnance QF 18-pounder
- Engagements: First World War Western Front

The Shropshire Royal Horse Artillery was a Territorial Force Royal Horse Artillery battery that was formed in Shropshire in 1908 from the Shropshire Battery of the 1st Shropshire and Staffordshire Artillery Volunteers, Royal Garrison Artillery of the Volunteer Force. It saw active service during the First World War on the Western Front in 1917 and 1918 as part of an Army Field Artillery Brigade. A second line battery, 2/1st Shropshire RHA, also served on the Western Front in 1917 and 1918 as part of another Army Field Artillery Brigade. It was reconstituted post-war as a medium artillery battery and served as such in the Second World War.

== History ==
=== Formation ===
The Territorial Force (TF) was formed on 1 April 1908 following the enactment of the Territorial and Reserve Forces Act 1907 (7 Edw.7, c.9) which combined and re-organised the old Volunteer Force, the Honourable Artillery Company and the Yeomanry. On formation, the TF contained 14 infantry divisions and 14 mounted yeomanry brigades. Each yeomanry brigade included a horse artillery battery and an ammunition column.

On 18 March 1908, Shropshire Royal Horse Artillery (Territorial Force) was proposed to be raised from the Shropshire Battery of the 1st Shropshire and Staffordshire Artillery Volunteers, RGA. This was the only one of the new horse artillery batteries (other than those of the Honourable Artillery Company) that pre-existed the establishment of the Territorial Force in 1908. It was recognized by the Army Council on 7 May 1908. The unit consisted of

- Battery HQ at Shrewsbury
- Shropshire RHA Battery at Shrewsbury
- Welsh Border Mounted Brigade Ammunition Column at Church Stretton

The unit was equipped with four Ehrhardt 15-pounder guns and allocated as artillery support to the Welsh Border Mounted Brigade.

=== First World War ===
In accordance with the Territorial and Reserve Forces Act 1907 (7 Edw.7, c.9), which brought the Territorial Force into being, the TF was intended to be a home defence force for service during wartime and members could not be compelled to serve outside the country. However, on the outbreak of war on 4 August 1914, many members volunteered for Imperial Service. Therefore, TF units were split into 1st Line (liable for overseas service) and 2nd Line (home service for those unable or unwilling to serve overseas) units. 2nd Line units performed the home defence role, although in fact most of these were also posted abroad in due course.

==== 1/1st Shropshire ====
The 1st Line battery was embodied with the Welsh Border Mounted Brigade on 4 August 1914 at the outbreak of the First World War and moved to East Anglia. It joined the 1st Mounted Division in September 1914, replacing 2nd South Midland Mounted Brigade which moved to 2nd Mounted Division.

The battery was re-equipped with four 18-pounders on 30 December 1915 at Beccles. In March 1916, the Welsh Border Mounted Brigade (without the battery) was dismounted and left for Egypt. The brigade was replaced in the 1st Mounted Division by its 2nd line 2/1st Welsh Border Mounted Brigade and the battery remained with the division until August 1916.

2/IV London (Howitzer) Brigade, (Note: The basic organic unit of the Royal Artillery was, and is, the Battery. When grouped together they formed brigades, in the same way that infantry battalions or cavalry regiments were grouped together in brigades. At the outbreak of the First World War, a field artillery brigade of headquarters (4 officers, 37 other ranks), three batteries (5 and 193 each), and a brigade ammunition column (4 and 154) had a total strength just under 800 so was broadly comparable to an infantry battalion (just over 1,000) or a cavalry regiment (about 550). Like an infantry battalion, an artillery brigade was usually commanded by a Lieutenant-Colonel. Artillery brigades were redesignated as regiments in 1938. Note that the battery strength refers to a battery of six guns; a four-gun battery would be about two thirds of this.) RFA (T.F.) of 58th (2/1st London) Division was broken up in July 1916 when it batteries were posted to 2/I and 2/II London Brigades, RFA (T.F.) (that is, before the field artillery brigades of the Territorial Force divisions were numbered in a single sequence). The brigade was reformed for 58th Division in August 1916 as CCXCIII Brigade, Royal Field Artillery (T.F.) with two gun batteries provided by 1/1st Shropshire RHA (A/CCXCIII Battery) and 1/1st Glamorganshire RHA (B/CCXCIII Battery) and two howitzer batteries (C(H) and D(H) of four 4.5" howitzers each). The Brigade Ammunition Column had been redundant since the Welsh Border Mounted Brigade had left, so the men were transferred to the 58th Divisional Trench Mortar Brigade.

CCXCIII Brigade landed at Le Havre on 22 January 1917. On 6 February 1917, D(H) Battery was split between D(H)/CCXC Battery and D(H)/CCXCI Battery; the remainder of the brigade became CCXCIII Army Field Artillery Brigade, RFA, (Note: Army Field Artillery Brigades were artillery brigades that were excess to the needs of the divisions, withdrawn to form an artillery reserve.) now with two batteries of six 18-pounders and one of four 4.5" howitzers.

At the Armistice, the battery (six 18-pounders) was still with CCXCIII Army Brigade, RFA serving as Army Troops with the First Army.

==== 2/1st Shropshire ====
2/1st Shropshire RHA (T.F.)
- Active: 1914 – May 1919
- Country: United Kingdom
- Branch: British Army
- Type: Artillery
- Size: Battery
- Part of: 2/1st Welsh Border Mounted Brigade; CLVIII Brigade, RFA
- Equipment: Ordnance QF 15-pounder Ordnance QF 18-pounder
- Engagements: First World War Western Front

Shropshire RHA formed a 2nd line in 1914, initially designated as the Shropshire (Reserve) Battery RHA and later given a fractional designation as 2/1st Shropshire Battery, RHA.

The battery joined the 2nd line 2/1st Welsh Border Mounted Brigade on formation in September 1914. The brigade was posted to Northumberland in January 1915 and attached to the 63rd (2nd Northumberland) Division. In March 1916, the brigade joined the 1st Mounted Division to replace the 1st Line Welsh Border Mounted Brigade which was dismounted for service in Egypt.

The battery (along with 2/1st Berkshire RHA) joined CLVIII Brigade, RFA when it was reformed (Note: The original CLVIII Brigade, RFA was formed for 35th Division in Accrington and Burnley from December 1914. It was broken up in France between 8 January and 28 February 1917.) at Heytesbury, Wiltshire on 13 April 1917. The two RHA batteries provided the manpower for the Brigade Ammunition Column. At this point, the battery had been rearmed with 18-pounders. The brigade disembarked at Boulogne on 24 May 1917 and became an Army Field Brigade. On 6 July 1917, the battery was redesignated as A/CLVIII Battery and 2/1st Berkshire RHA became C/CLVIII Battery.

At the Armistice, the battery (by now made up to six 18-pounders) was still with CLVIII Army Brigade, RFA serving as Army Troops with the Fifth Army.

=== Interwar ===
Shropshire RHA was reconstituted in the Territorial Force on 7 February 1920 when it formed a battery (later numbered 240th) in 6th (Cheshire and Shropshire) Medium Brigade, Royal Garrison Artillery and ceased to be a Royal Horse Artillery battery. The rest of the brigade was formed from the 6th Battalion, Cheshire Regiment (T.F.) and the Cheshire Brigade, RFA (T.F.). The unit was later redesignated as 60th (6th Cheshire and Shropshire) Medium Brigade, RA, (TA). In January 1927, 240th Battery regained its sub-title as 240th (Shropshire RHA) Medium Battery, RA (TA).

=== Second World War ===
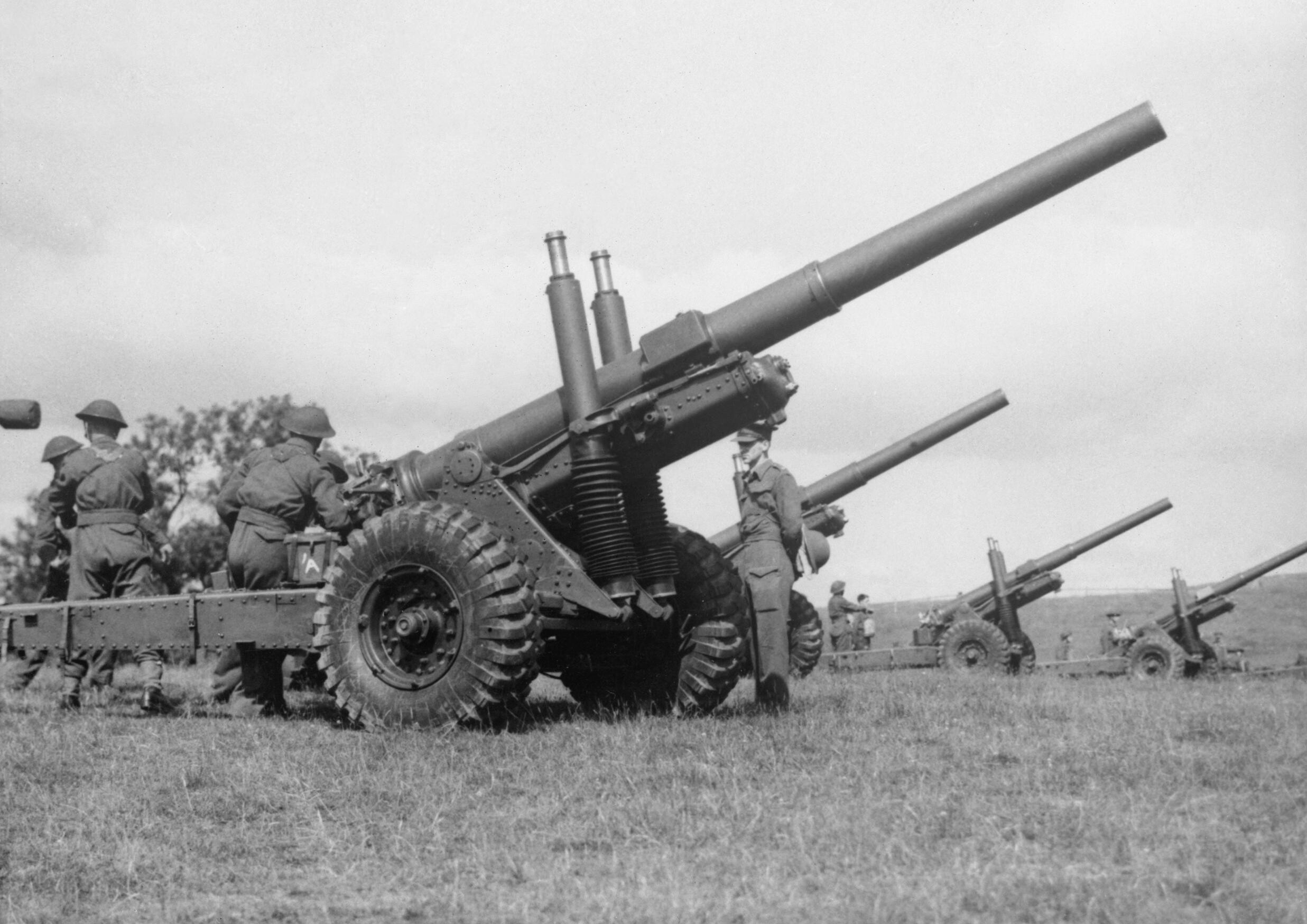
5.5-inch guns of 240 Bty, 51st Medium Rgt, at Ellesmere Port, Cheshire, 7 July 1941.

In 1938, 240th (Shropshire RHA) Battery transferred from the 60th Medium Regiment to 51st (Midland) Medium Regiment, and fought with it throughout the Second World War, in 'Arkforce' during the Battle of France, in the Tunisian and Italian campaigns, and finally in Germany at the end of the war.

=== Postwar ===
51st (Midland) Medium Rgt was placed in suspended animation in 1946. When it was reformed in the postwar TA as 351st (Midland) Medium Rgt, the Shropshire RHA element instead joined 639th Heavy Regiment as P Battery, later becoming HQ RA of 48th District. In 1967, it became A Squadron (Shropshire RHA) in the Shropshire Yeomanry.

== See also ==
- List of Territorial Force horse artillery batteries 1908

== Bibliography ==
- Becke, Archibald F. (1936). Order of Battle of Divisions Part 2A. The Territorial Force Mounted Divisions and the 1st-Line Territorial Force Divisions (42–56). London: HMSO. OCLC 4405016.
- Becke, Archibald F. (1937). Order of Battle of Divisions Part 2B. The 2nd-Line Territorial Force Divisions (57th–69th) with The Home-Service Divisions (71st–73rd) and 74th and 75th Divisions. London: HMSO. OCLC 4405016.
- Becke, Archibald F. (1945). Order of Battle of Divisions Part 3B. New Army Divisions (30-41) & 63rd (R.N.) Division. London: HMSO. OCLC 4405016.
- Clarke, Dale (2004). British Artillery 1914–19 Field Army Artillery. Vol. 94 of New Vanguard Series. Oxford: Osprey Publishing. ISBN 1-84176-688-7.
- Ellis, Major L.F. (2004) [1954]. The War in France and Flanders 1939–1940 Appendix 1: British Forces Engaged. History of the Second World War, United Kingdom Military Series (Naval and Military Press, Uckfield ed.). London: HMSO.
- Ellis, L.F. (1968). Victory in the West: The defeat of Germany. History of the Second World War. London: H.M. Stationery Office.
- Frederick, J.B.M. (1984). Lineage Book of British Land Forces 1660–1978. Wakefield, Yorkshire: Microform Academic Publishers. ISBN 1-85117-009-X.
- James, Brigadier E.A. (1978). British Regiments 1914–18. London: Samson Books Limited. ISBN 0-906304-03-2.
- Joslen, Lt-Col H.F. (1990) [1st. Pub. HMSO:1960]. Orders of Battle, Second World War, 1939–1945. London: London Stamp Exchange. ISBN 0-948130-03-2.
- Derek Harrison with Peter Duckers, Shropshire Royal Horse Artillery 1908–1920, Shrewsbury: Kingswood/Shropshire Regimental Museum, 2006.
- Litchfield, Norman E.H. (1992). The Territorial Artillery 1908–1988 (Their Lineage, Uniforms and Badges). Nottingham: Sherwood Press. ISBN 0-9508205-2-0.
- Rinaldi, Richard A (2008). Order of Battle of the British Army 1914. Ravi Rikhye. ISBN 978-0-9776072-8-0.
- Westlake, Ray (1992). British Territorial Units 1914–18. Osprey Publishing. ISBN 978-1-85532-168-7.
- Order of Battle of the British Armies in France, November 11th, 1918. France: General Staff, GHQ. 1918.
