= Cheshire Yeomanry =

The Cheshire Yeomanry
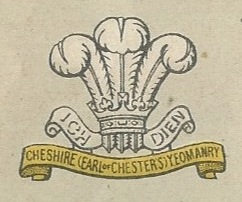
- Cap badge
- Active: 1797–present
- Country: Kingdom of Great Britain (1797–1800); United Kingdom (1801–present)
- Branch: British Army
- Type: Yeomanry
- Role: Formation Reconnaissance; Signals
- Size: Two Squadrons
- Part of: Royal Armoured Corps; Royal Signals
- Garrison/HQ: Chester
- March: Quick - John Peel
- Engagements: Peterloo Massacre; Second Boer War; First World War Egypt 1916–17 Palestine 1917–18 France and Flanders 1918 Second World War Syria 1941 North-West Europe 1945
- Battle honours: See battle honours below

Commanders
- Honorary Colonel: Major Peter M. Cooper, TD
- Notable commanders: Hugh Grosvenor, 2nd Duke of Westminster

The Cheshire Yeomanry is a yeomanry regiment that can trace its history back to 1797 when Sir John Leicester of Tabley raised a county regiment of light cavalry in response to the growing fears of invasion from Napoleonic France. Its lineage is maintained by C (Cheshire Yeomanry) Squadron, the Queen's Own Yeomanry.

== History ==
=== Formation and early history ===
The regiment was founded in 1797 when Sir John Leicester of Tabley raised a county regiment of light cavalry in response to the growing fears of invasion from Napoleonic France. In 1803, the Prince of Wales (later King George IV) gave his permission for the regiment to wear his triple feather crest, a badge that Cheshire Yeoman still wear today.

=== Peterloo Massacre ===
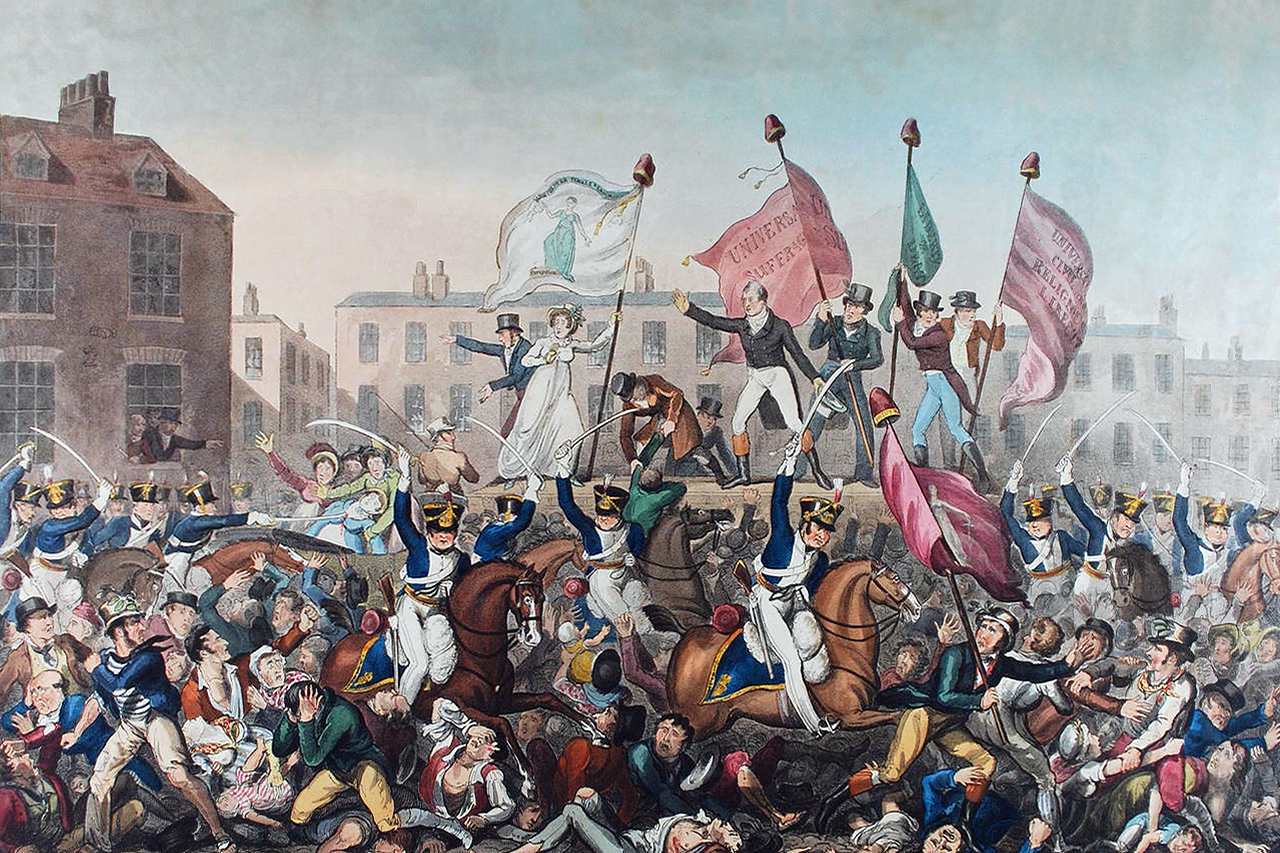
The Cheshire Yeomanry at the Peterloo Massacre

The Peterloo Massacre of 16 August 1819 was the result of a cavalry charge into the crowd at a public meeting at Saint Peters Field, in Manchester, England. Eleven people were killed and more than 400, including many women and children, injured. Local magistrates arranged for a substantial number of regular soldiers to be on hand. The troops included 600 men of the 15th Hussars; several hundred infantrymen; a Royal Horse Artillery unit with two six-pounder (2.7 kg) guns; 400 men of the Cheshire Yeomanry, 400 special constables and 120 cavalry of the Manchester and Salford Yeomanry, relatively inexperienced militia recruited from among shopkeepers and tradesmen.

=== Second Boer War ===
The Yeomanry was not intended to serve overseas, but due to the string of defeats during Black Week in December 1899, the British government realized they were going to need more troops than just the regular army. A Royal Warrant was issued on 24 December 1899 to allow volunteer forces to serve in the Second Boer War. The Royal Warrant asked standing Yeomanry regiments to provide service companies of approximately 115 men each for the Imperial Yeomanry (IY), equipped as Mounted infantry. The regiment provided the 21st (Cheshire) and 22nd (Cheshire) Companies for the 2nd Battalion, IY, in 1900. The mounted infantry experiment was considered a success and the existing yomenary regiments were converted to IY in 1901, the regiment becoming Cheshire Imperial Yeomanry (Earl of Chester's); the word 'Imperial' was dropped in 1908 when the yeomanry were transferred to the Territorial Force (TF). The regiment had its headquarters at Old Bank Buildings in Foregate Street at this time.

=== First World War ===
In accordance with the Territorial and Reserve Forces Act 1907 (7 Edw. 7, c.9) which brought the Territorial Force into being, the TF was intended to be a home defence force for service during wartime and members could not be compelled to serve outside the country. However, on the outbreak of war on 4 August 1914, many members volunteered for Imperial Service. Therefore, TF units were split in August and September 1914 into 1st Line (liable for overseas service) and 2nd Line (home service for those unable or unwilling to serve overseas) units. Later, a 3rd Line was formed to act as a reserve, providing trained replacements for the 1st and 2nd Line regiments.

==== 1/1st Cheshire Yeomanry ====
The 1/1st Cheshire Yeomanry was mobilised with the Welsh Border Mounted Brigade on 4 August 1914 at the outbreak of the First World War. It moved to East Anglia, where it joined the 1st Mounted Division in September 1914. In November 1915, the brigade was dismounted.

The regiment was posted with the brigade to Egypt in March 1916. On 20 March, the Welsh Border Mounted Brigade was absorbed into the 4th Dismounted Brigade (along with the South Wales Mounted Brigade).

The brigade was with the Suez Canal Defences when, on 14 January 1917, Egyptian Expeditionary Force (EEF) Order No. 26 instructed that the 2nd, 3rd and 4th Dismounted Brigades be reorganized as the 229th, 230th and 231st Brigades.

Between January and March 1917 the small Yeomanry regiments were amalgamated and numbered as battalions of infantry regiments recruiting from the same districts. (Note: The 74th (Yeomanry) Division commanded 12 infantry battalions formed from 18 yeomanry regiments.) As a result, the 1/1st Cheshire Yeomanry was amalgamated with the 1/1st Shropshire Yeomanry at Cairo on 2 March 1917 to form the 10th (Shropshire and Cheshire Yeomanry) Battalion, King's Shropshire Light Infantry (10th KSLI).

On 23 February, the General Officer Commanding the EEF, Lieutenant-General Sir A.J. Murray, sought permission from the War Office to form the 229th, 230th and 231st Brigades into a new division. On 25 February, the War Office granted permission and the new 74th (Yeomanry) Division started to form. The 231st Brigade joined the division at el Arish by 9 March. The 10th KSLI remained with 231st Brigade in 74th (Yeomanry) Division for the rest of the war.

It took part in the invasion of Palestine in 1917 and 1918, including the Second (17–19 April 1917) and Third Battles of Gaza (27 October–7 November) – including the capture of Beersheba on 31 October and the Sheria Position on 6 November. At the end of 1917, it took part in the capture and defence of Jerusalem and in March 1918 in the Battle of Tell 'Asur. On 3 April 1918, the division was warned that it would move to France and by 30 April 1918 had completed embarkation at Alexandria.

In May 1918, the battalion landed at Marseille, France with 74th (Yeomanry) Division. It served in France and Flanders with the division for the rest of the war. By 18 May, the division had concentrated around Rue in the Abbeville area. Here, the dismounted Yeomanry underwent training for service on the Western Front, particularly trench warfare and gas defence.

On 14 July 1918, the Yeomanry Division went into the line for the first time, near Merville on the right of XI Corps. From September 1918, as part of III Corps of Fourth Army, it took part in the Hundred Days Offensive including the Second Battle of the Somme (Second Battle of Bapaume) and the Battles of the Hindenburg Line (Battle of Épehy). In October and November 1918, it took part in the Final Advance in Artois and Flanders. By the Armistice, it was near Tournai, Belgium, still with 74th (Yeomanry) Division.

With the end of the war, the troops of 74th Division were engaged in railway repair work and education was undertaken while demobilisation began. The division and its subformations were disbanded on 10 July 1919.

==== 2/1st Cheshire Yeomanry ====
The 2nd Line regiment was formed in 1914. It joined the 2/1st Welsh Border Mounted Brigade in the Newcastle area of Northumberland in January 1915 (along with the 2/1st Shropshire Yeomanry and the 2/1st Denbighshire Hussars). The brigade was placed under the command of the 63rd (2nd Northumbrian) Division. On 31 March 1916, the remaining Mounted Brigades were ordered to be numbered in a single sequence and the brigade became 17th Mounted Brigade, still in Northumberland under Northern Command.

In April 1916, it moved with its brigade to East Anglia where it joined the 1st Mounted Division; it replaced its 1st Line which had departed (dismounted) for Egypt. By July, it had left with its brigade for the Morpeth, Northumberland area.

In July 1916, there was a major reorganization of 2nd Line yeomanry units in the United Kingdom. All but 12 regiments were converted to cyclists and as a consequence the regiment was dismounted and the brigade converted to 10th Cyclist Brigade. Further reorganization in October and November 1916 saw the brigade redesignated as 6th Cyclist Brigade in November, still in the Morpeth area. In July 1917, the regiment moved to Acklington.

Early in 1918, the brigade moved to Ireland and was stationed at the Curragh. There were no further changes before the end of the war.

==== 3/1st Cheshire Yeomanry ====
The 3rd Line regiment was formed in 1915 and in the summer was affiliated to a Reserve Cavalry Regiment at The Curragh. In the summer of 1916, it was attached to the 3rd Line Groups of the 55th (West Lancashire) Division as its 1st Line was serving as infantry. The regiment was disbanded in early 1917 with personnel transferring to the 2nd Line or to the 4th (Reserve) Battalion of the Cheshire Regiment at Oswestry.

=== Between the wars ===
Post war, a commission was set up to consider the shape of the Territorial Force (Territorial Army from 1 October 1921). The experience of the First World War made it clear that cavalry was surfeit. The commission decided that only the 14 most senior regiments were to be retained as cavalry (though the Lovat Scouts and the Scottish Horse were also to remain mounted as "scouts"). Eight regiments were converted to Armoured Car Companies of the Royal Tank Corps (RTC), one was reduced to a battery in another regiment, one was absorbed into a local infantry battalion, one became a signals regiment and two were disbanded. The remaining 25 regiments were converted to brigades (Note: The basic organic unit of the Royal Artillery was, and is, the Battery. When grouped together they formed brigades, in the same way that infantry battalions or cavalry regiments were grouped together in brigades. At the outbreak of the First World War, a field artillery brigade of headquarters (4 officers, 37 other ranks), three batteries (5 and 193 each), and a brigade ammunition column (4 and 154) had a total strength just under 800, so was broadly comparable to an infantry battalion (just over 1,000) or a cavalry regiment (about 550). Like an infantry battalion, an artillery brigade was usually commanded by a Lieutenant-Colonel. Artillery brigades were redesignated as regiments in 1938.) of the Royal Field Artillery between 1920 and 1922. As the 8th most senior regiment in the order of precedence, the regiment was retained as horsed cavalry.

=== Second World War ===
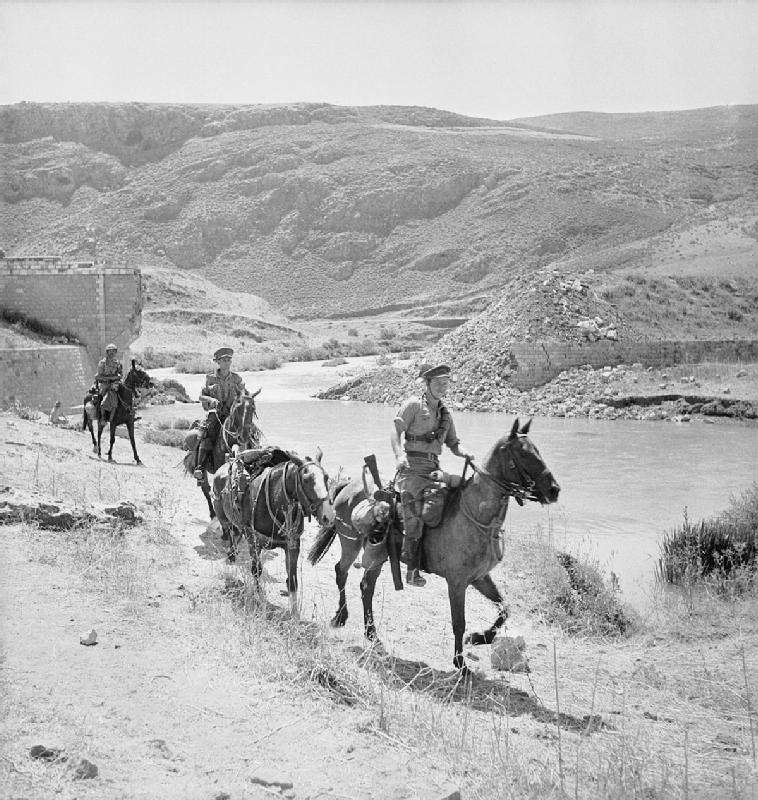
The Cheshire Yeomanry patrolling on horseback at Marjuyan in Syria, 16 June 1941. (IWM E3593)

During the Second World War, the regiment was part of the 6th Cavalry Brigade, 1st Cavalry Division and remained mounted until 1942, seeing action in Palestine, Syria and the Lebanon. As one of the last regiments of the British Army to fight on horseback, the Cheshire Yeomanry found it particularly painful to lose its mounts and to re-role as a Signals Regiment, when its title changed in 1942 to the 5th Line of Communications Signals Regiment. After leaving the Middle East, the regiment was redesignated the 17th Line of Communication Signals Regiment (Cheshire Yeomanry) for service in North-West Europe.

=== Post war ===
On May Day 1947, the Cheshire Yeomanry reformed as an armoured regiment, equipped with Cromwell and Comet tanks. It continued as such until 1958, when it re-equipped with Daimler Armoured Cars. The defence re-organisation of 1967 led to the disbanding of the regiment except for a small cadre, but in 1971 the Queen's Own Yeomanry (QOY) was formed from four old yeomanry regiments, including the Cheshire Yeomanry. This lasted until 1999, when the regiment, as part of the Strategic Defence Review, was amalgamated into the Royal Mercian and Lancastrian Yeomanry.

==== The Royal Mercian and Lancastrian Yeomanry ====
The RMLY's mission was to provide Challenger 2 (CR2) War Establishment Reserves (WER) to the Regular Army. To fulfil this commitment, the RMLY soldiers trained as Challenger 2 loaders and gunners. In 2014 C (Cheshire Yeomanry) Squadron, which is based in Chester, re-joined the Queen's Own Yeomanry.

==== 33 (Lancashire and Cheshire) Signal Regiment ====
A second squadron continues in service as 80th (Cheshire Yeomanry) Signal Squadron (V), part of 33 Signal Regiment, Royal Signals.

== Regimental museum ==
The Cheshire Military Museum is based at Chester Castle.

== Battle honours ==
The Cheshire Yeomanry was awarded the following battle honours (honours in bold are emblazoned on the regimental colours):

Second Boer War	**South Africa 1900–01**
First World War	**Somme 1918**, **Bapaume 1918**, **Hindenburg Line**, **Épehy**, **Pursuit to Mons**, **France and Flanders 1918**, Egypt 1916–17, **Gaza**, **Jerusalem**, **Jericho**, **Tell 'Asur**, Palestine 1917–18
Second World War	**Syria 1941** Honorary Distinction: Badge of the Royal Corps of Signals with year-date "1945" and scroll "North-West Europe"

== Uniforms ==
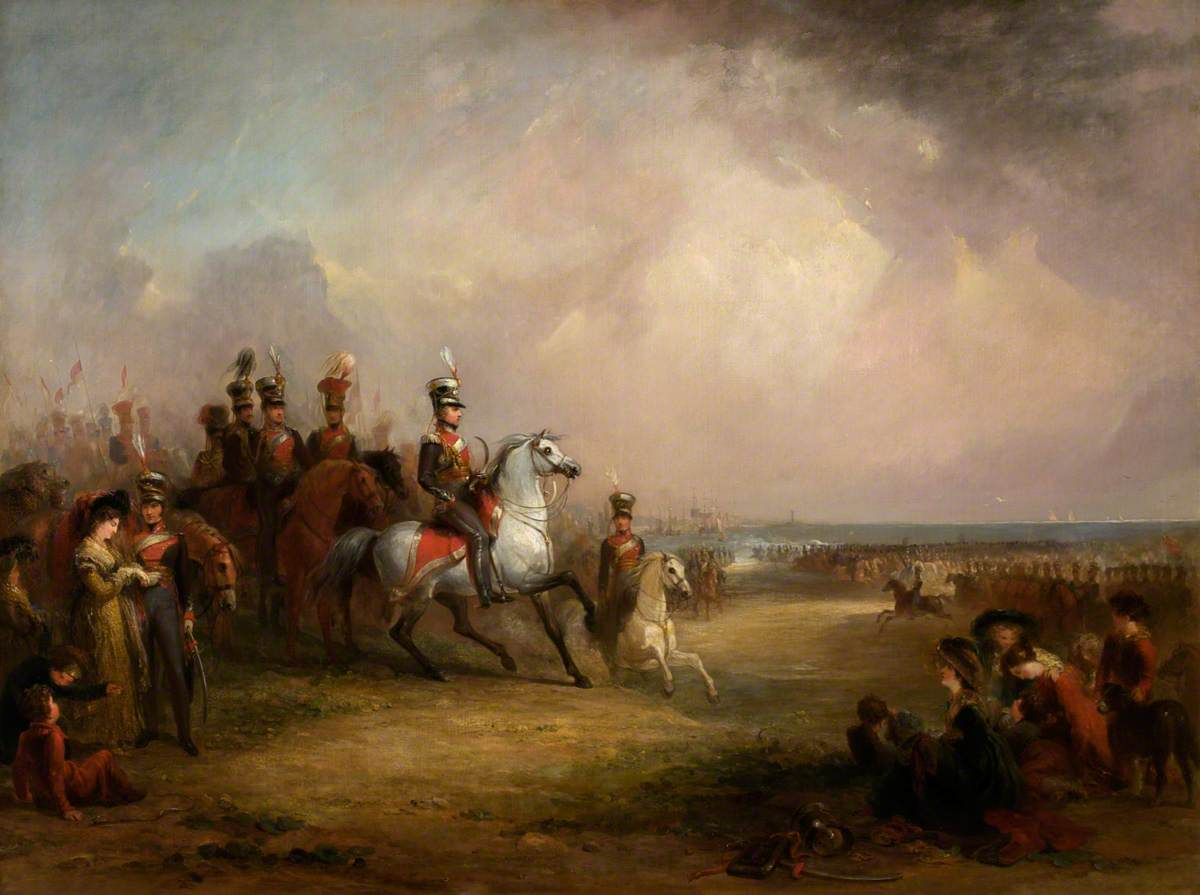
Sir John Leicester and the Cheshire Yeomanry Exercising on the Sands at Liverpool by George Jones, 1824

The full dress uniform of the Cheshire Yeomanry, worn prior to World War I, closely resembled that of the regular hussar regiments of the British Army. Chest braiding and piping on the dark blue tunic was however white (rather than the yellow of regulars). In an unusual combination collar facings were red while overall (tight cavalry trousers) stripes were white. Peaked caps were normally worn although fur busbies were borrowed for the 1911 Coronation.

The plain khaki service dress of the regular cavalry was worn from about 1907 onwards, replacing the blue uniform for nearly all occasions after 1914. The service dress was in turn replaced by battle dress, or other standard British Army uniforms, following the dismounting of the regiment in 1942.

== See also ==
- Imperial Yeomanry
- List of Yeomanry Regiments 1908
- Yeomanry
- Yeomanry order of precedence
- British yeomanry during the First World War
- Second line yeomanry regiments of the British Army

== Bibliography ==
- Becke, Archibald F. (1936). Order of Battle of Divisions Part 2A. The Territorial Force Mounted Divisions and the 1st-Line Territorial Force Divisions (42–56). London: HMSO. OCLC 4405016.
- Becke, Archibald F. (1937). Order of Battle of Divisions Part 2B. The 2nd-Line Territorial Force Divisions (57th–69th) with The Home-Service Divisions (71st–73rd) and 74th and 75th Divisions. London: HMSO. OCLC 4405016.
- James, Brigadier E.A. (1978). British Regiments 1914–18. London: Samson Books Limited. ISBN 0-906304-03-2.
- Lord, Cliff; Watson, Graham (2003). The Royal Corps of Signals : unit histories of the Corps (1920-2001) and its antecedents. Solihull, West Midlands, England: Helion & Company. ISBN 1-874622-92-2. OCLC 184820114. ProQuest 5774170.
- Mileham, Patrick (1994). The Yeomanry Regiments; 200 Years of Tradition. Edinburgh: Canongate Academic. ISBN 1-898410-36-4.
- Reid, Robert (1989), The Peterloo Massacre, William Heinemann, ISBN 978-0-434-62901-5
- Rinaldi, Richard A (2008). Order of Battle of the British Army 1914. Ravi Rikhye. ISBN 978-0-9776072-8-0.
