= Shropshire Yeomanry =

- Badge of the Shropshire Yeomanry
- Active: 1795–1969
- Country: Kingdom of Great Britain (1795–1800); United Kingdom (1801–1969)
- Branch: British Army
- Type: Cavalry
- Role: Yeomanry
- Part of: Royal Armoured Corps
- Engagements: Second Boer War; First World War Egypt 1916–17 Palestine 1917–18 France and Flanders 1918 Second World War Sicily 1943 Italy 1943–45
- Battle honours: See battle honours below

Commanders
- Honorary Colonel: Colonel Francis S. Acton, VR

Insignia
- Identification symbol: Shrop Yeo

The Shropshire Yeomanry was a yeomanry regiment of the British Army, first raised in 1795, which served as a cavalry and dismounted infantry regiment in the First World War and as a cavalry and an artillery regiment in the Second World War. It was then amalgamated with the Shropshire Royal Horse Artillery.

In 1969, the regiment was replaced by No. 4 Squadron, 35 (South Midlands) Signal Regiment and the Shropshire Yeomanry Cadre. These later formed the Shropshire Yeomanry Squadron of the Queen's Own Mercian Yeomanry before their amalgamation into the Royal Mercian and Lancastrian Yeomanry and subsequent re-subordination to the Royal Yeomanry.

== History ==
=== Formation and early history ===
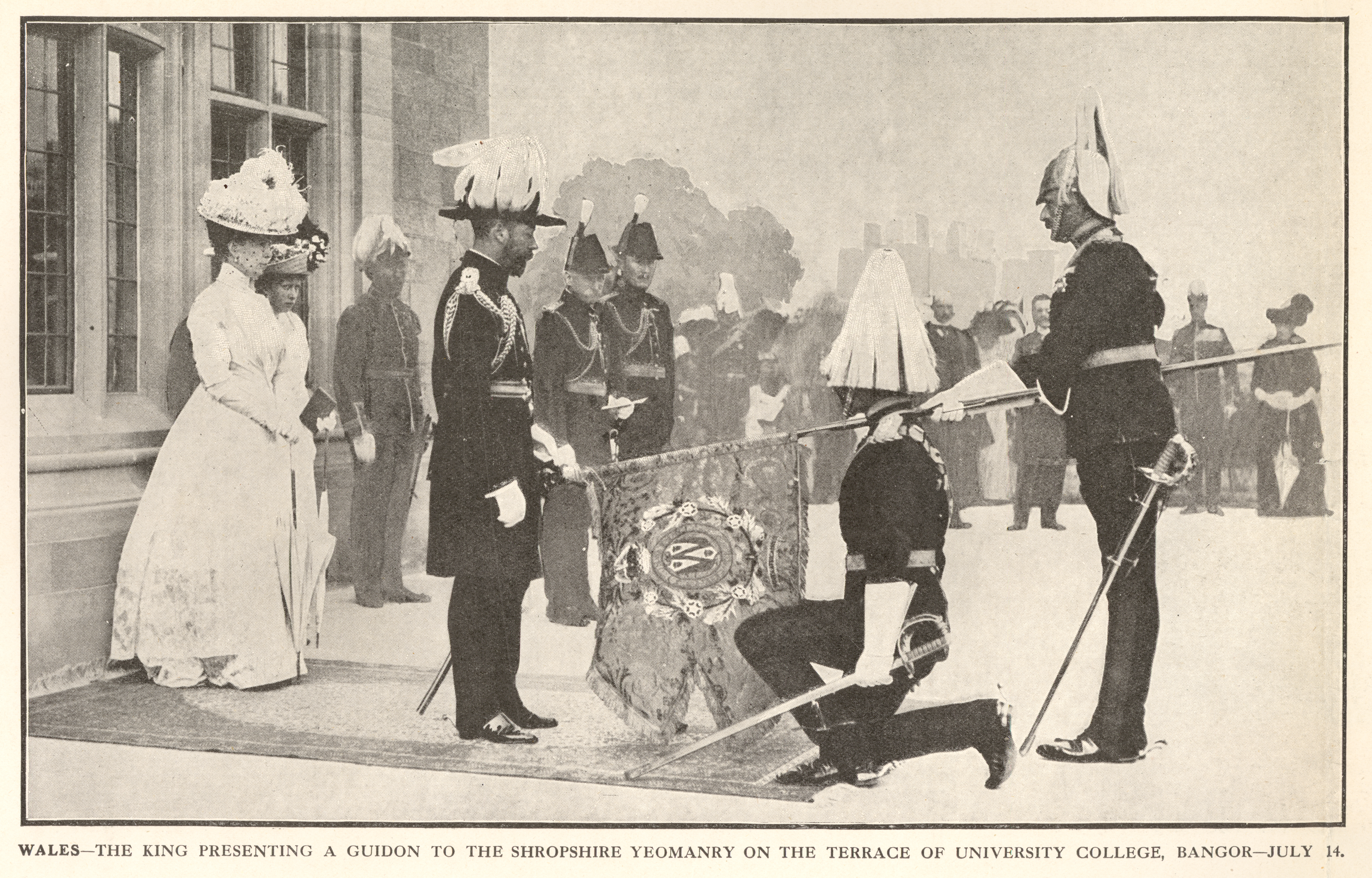
King George V presents a guidon to the Shropshire Yeomanry (1911).

The Shropshire Yeomanry dates its origins to the French Revolutionary Wars, when volunteer cavalry units were raised throughout the country. These small units, which included the Wellington Troop formed in Shropshire in 1795, were amalgamated into three larger units, the Shrewsbury Yeomanry Cavalry, the South Shropshire Yeomanry Cavalry and the North Shropshire Yeomanry Cavalry in 1815. These larger units were consolidated into a single unit in 1872.

South Shropshire and Shrewsbury Yeomanry troops were also present during the 1821 Cinderloo Uprising, which saw 3,000 colliers in present-day Telford go on strike to protest the lowering of their wages. Clashes between the Yeomanry and the workers resulted in the deaths of two strikers whilst another was arrested and later hanged.

=== Second Boer War ===
The Yeomanry was not intended to serve overseas, but due to the string of defeats during Black Week in December 1899, the British government realized they were going to need more troops than just the regular army. A Royal Warrant was issued on 24 December 1899 to allow volunteer forces to serve in the Second Boer War. The Royal Warrant asked standing Yeomanry regiments to provide service companies of approximately 115 men each for the Imperial Yeomanry (IY). The regiment provided the 13th (Shropshire) Company for the 5th Battalion in 1900. The Imperial Yeomanry was equipped and trained as Mounted infantry. The experiment was considered a success and in 1901 all the existing yeomanry regiments were converted to IY: the regiment became the Shropshire Imperial Yeomanry. The 'Imperial' part of the title was dropped when the yeomanry were transferred to the Territorial Force (TF) in 1908. The regiment had its headquarters at Kingston House in St Alkmunds Place in Shrewsbury at that time.

=== First World War ===
In accordance with the Territorial and Reserve Forces Act 1907 (7 Edw. 7, c.9), which brought the Territorial Force into being, the TF was intended to be a home defence force for service during wartime and members could not be compelled to serve outside the country. However, on the outbreak of war on 4 August 1914, many members volunteered for Imperial Service. Therefore, TF units were split in August and September 1914 into 1st Line (liable for overseas service) and 2nd Line (home service for those unable or unwilling to serve overseas) units. Later, a 3rd Line was formed to act as a reserve, providing trained replacements for the 1st and 2nd Line regiments.

==== 1/1st Shropshire Yeomanry ====
The 1/1st Shropshire Yeomanry was mobilised with the Welsh Border Mounted Brigade on 4 August 1914 at the outbreak of the First World War. It moved to East Anglia where it joined the 1st Mounted Division in September 1914. In November 1915, the brigade was dismounted.

The regiment was posted with the brigade to Egypt in March 1916. On 20 March, Welsh Border Mounted Brigade was absorbed into the 4th Dismounted Brigade (along with the South Wales Mounted Brigade).

The brigade was with the Suez Canal Defences when, on 14 January 1917, Egyptian Expeditionary Force (EEF) Order No. 26 instructed that the 2nd, 3rd and 4th Dismounted Brigades be reorganized as the 229th, 230th and 231st Brigades.

Between January and March 1917, the small Yeomanry regiments were amalgamated and numbered as battalions of infantry regiments recruiting from the same districts. (Note: The 74th (Yeomanry) Division commanded 12 infantry battalions formed from 18 yeomanry regiments.) As a result, the 1/1st Shropshire Yeomanry was amalgamated with the 1/1st Cheshire Yeomanry at Cairo on 2 March 1917 to form the 10th (Shropshire and Cheshire Yeomanry) Battalion, King's Shropshire Light Infantry (10th KSLI).

On 23 February, the General Officer Commanding the EEF, Lieutenant-General Sir A.J. Murray, sought permission from the War Office to form the 229th, 230th and 231st Brigades into a new division. On 25 February, the War Office granted permission and the new 74th (Yeomanry) Division started to form. The 231st Brigade joined the division at el Arish by 9 March. The 10th KSLI remained with 231st Brigade in 74th (Yeomanry) Division for the rest of the war.

It took part in the invasion of Palestine in 1917 and 1918, including the Second (17–19 April 1917) and Third Battles of Gaza (27 October–7 November) – including the capture of Beersheba on 31 October and the Sheria Position on 6 November. At the end of 1917, it took part in the capture and defence of Jerusalem and in March 1918 in the Battle of Tell 'Asur. On 3 April 1918, the division was warned that it would move to France and by 30 April 1918 had completed embarkation at Alexandria.

In May 1918, the battalion landed at Marseille, France with 74th (Yeomanry) Division. It served in France and Flanders with the division for the rest of the war. By 18 May, the division had concentrated around Rue in the Abbeville area. Here, the dismounted Yeomanry underwent training for service on the Western Front, particularly trench warfare and gas defence.

On 14 July 1918, the Yeomanry Division went into the line for the first time, near Merville on the right of XI Corps. From September 1918, as part of III Corps of Fourth Army, it took part in the Hundred Days Offensive including the Second Battle of the Somme (Second Battle of Bapaume) and the Battles of the Hindenburg Line (Battle of Épehy). In October and November 1918, it took part in the Final Advance in Artois and Flanders. By the Armistice, it was near Tournai, Belgium, still with 74th (Yeomanry) Division.

With the end of the war, the troops of 74th Division were engaged in railway repair work and education was undertaken while demobilisation began. The division and its subformations were disbanded on 10 July 1919.

==== 2/1st Shropshire Yeomanry ====
The 2nd Line regiment was formed in 1914 and joined the 2/1st Welsh Border Mounted Brigade in the Newcastle area of Northumberland in January 1915 (along with the 2/1st Cheshire Yeomanry and the 2/1st Denbighshire Hussars). The brigade was placed under the command of the 63rd (2nd Northumbrian) Division. On 31 March 1916, the remaining Mounted Brigades were ordered to be numbered in a single sequence and the brigade became 17th Mounted Brigade, still in Northumberland under Northern Command.

In April 1916, it moved with its brigade to East Anglia where it joined the 1st Mounted Division; it replaced its 1st Line, which had departed (dismounted) for Egypt. By July, it had left with its brigade for the Morpeth, Northumberland area.

In July 1916, there was a major reorganization of 2nd Line yeomanry units in the United Kingdom. All but 12 regiments were converted to cyclists and as a consequence the regiment was dismounted and the brigade converted to 10th Cyclist Brigade. Further reorganization in October and November 1916 saw the brigade redesignated as 6th Cyclist Brigade in November, still in the Morpeth area. In March 1917, the regiment moved to Newbiggin, and later to Woodhorn near Morpeth.

Early in 1918, the Brigade moved to Ireland and was stationed at The Curragh. There were no further changes before the end of the war.

==== 3/1st Shropshire Yeomanry ====
The 3rd Line regiment was formed in 1914 and in the summer of 1915 affiliated to a Reserve Cavalry Regiment in Ireland. In the summer of 1916, it was dismounted and attached to the 3rd Line Groups of the 55th (West Lancashire) Division at Oswestry as its 1st Line was serving as infantry. The regiment was disbanded in early 1917 with personnel transferring to the 2nd Line regiment or to the 4th (Reserve) Battalion of the King's Shropshire Light Infantry, probably at Tenby.

=== Between the wars ===
Post war, a commission was set up to consider the shape of the Territorial Force (Territorial Army from 1 October 1921). The experience of the First World War made it clear that cavalry was surfeit. The commission decided that only the 14 most senior regiments were to be retained as cavalry (though the Lovat Scouts and the Scottish Horse were also to remain mounted as "scouts"). Eight regiments were converted to Armoured Car Companies of the Royal Tank Corps (RTC), one was reduced to a battery in another regiment, one was absorbed into a local infantry battalion, one became a signals regiment and two were disbanded. The remaining 25 regiments were converted to brigades (Note: The basic organic unit of the Royal Artillery was, and is, the Battery. When grouped together they formed brigades, in the same way that infantry battalions or cavalry regiments were grouped together in brigades. At the outbreak of the First World War, a field artillery brigade of headquarters (4 officers, 37 other ranks), three batteries (5 and 193 each), and a brigade ammunition column (4 and 154) had a total strength just under 800 so was broadly comparable to an infantry battalion (just over 1,000) or a cavalry regiment (about 550). Like an infantry battalion, an artillery brigade was usually commanded by a Lieutenant-Colonel. Artillery brigades were redesignated as regiments in 1938.) of the Royal Field Artillery between 1920 and 1922. As the 6th most senior regiment in the order of precedence, the Shropshire Yeomanry was retained as horsed cavalry.

=== Second World War ===
==== 75th (Shropshire Yeomanry) Medium Regiment, RA ====
On 1 September 1939, the Shropshire Yeomanry was a Horsed Cavalry Regiment, but, in 1940, the Regiment lost its horses and converted to artillery. H.Q. and "A" Squadrons formed 101 and 102 Batteries of the 75th Medium Regiment, R.A. On 20 December 1942, the Regiment, equipped with 4.5" howitzers, left Liverpool for Durban and Suez, arriving on 14 April 1943. 101 Battery was re-equipped with 5.5 howitzers, whilst 102 kept its 4.5s.

After intensive training, 101 battery moved through the desert to Tripoli, then went to Syracuse in Sicily and saw its first action. 102 Battery arrived in Sicily from Egypt on 7 August.

The Regiment served through the Italian campaign, sometimes in support of the 5th Army, sometimes with the 8th Army (at least part of the time with 6 AGRA), and saw action in many notable battles. These included the third battle of Monte Cassino, operations against the Gustav Line and the breakthrough, operations against the Hitler Line, actions at Arezzo and the occupation of Florence and Forlì.

The Regiment went on to serve in the Apennines against the Gothic Line and on to the final offensives of the 8th Army in Spring 1945. The end of the war found the 75th Medium Regiment in defensive positions facing Tito's Yugoslav army in Venezia Giulia.

==== 76th (Shropshire Yeomanry) Medium Regiment, RA ====
After the conversion from Horsed Cavalry to Gunners in 1940, "B" and "C" Squadrons formed the nucleus of the 76th Medium Regiment as 112 and 113 Batteries, and where equipped with Great War 60-pounders, although these were later replaced by 6-in. howitzers. From then, until 1942, the Regiment was occupied in intensive training.

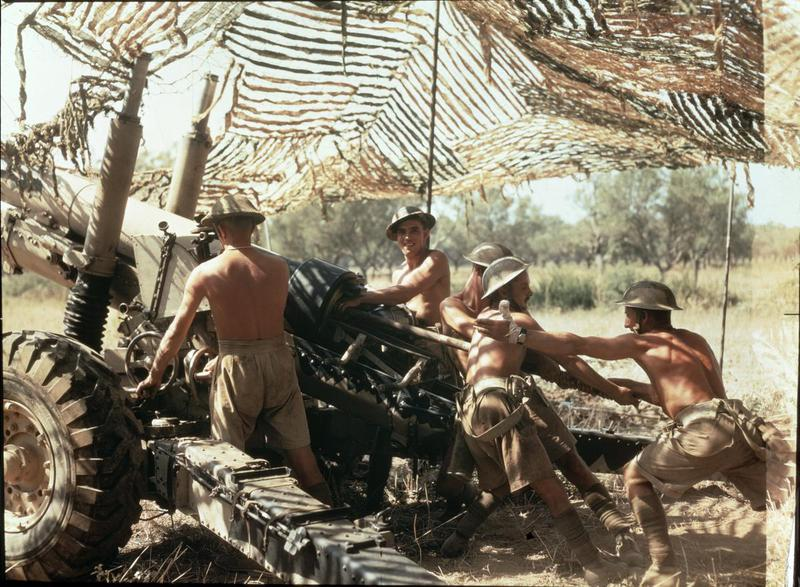
Shropshire Yeomanry in action in Italy with a 5.5-inch Howitzer

On 25 August 1942, now equipped with 5.5" howitzers, the unit sailed from Gourock-on-Clyde, also by way of Durban, to the Suez Area, arriving in November. In January 1943, the Regiment left Egypt and motored by way of the Sinai Desert along the Trans-Jordan Pipeline to Baghdad to join the Persia and Iraq Force ("Paiforce"). In April 1943, they moved to Syria and through a shortage of guns in Tunisia lost its own.

In May 1943, more guns arrived and combined operations with further intensive training were carried out in the Suez Canal area. They left the Middle East in December 1943, and landed at Taranto, Italy, by 9 December 1943. 112 Battery had at this time 5.5" howitzers and 113 Battery 4.5s; but shortly after landing, 112 lost its guns to another Yeomanry Regiment, receiving 4.5s in exchange. On 15 December 1943, the Regiment moved up to the Sangro battle and took over from its sister-regiment in support of the 8th Army. In February 1944, the Regiment moved across to Cassino and took part in the battles of 16 February to 15 March and the successful capture and break-through of 11 May, and then on to the Hitler Line. The advance now went beyond Rome, with the Regiment supporting the 6th South African Armoured Division up to and including the fight for Florence, except for the Arezzo battle, with 6th Armoured Division.

In April 1945, the Regiment again moved across Italy to the east coast to join the final offensive with the 8th Army. After the German surrender on 2 May 1945, the Regiment saw further action on the road to Austria. On VE Day, it, like its sister regiment, was watching Tito near Trieste.

=== Post war ===
Since 1947, as part of the Royal Armoured Corps, the Regiment has been equipped with Tanks, Armoured Cars, Scout Cars and Land Rovers. In 1959, Home Headquarters of the 1st Queen's Dragoon Guards was established at R.H.Q. in Shrewsbury and the new Regiment became associated with the Shropshire Yeomanry. From 1961 to 1967, the Pembroke Yeomanry was affiliated as a Sabre Squadron and, in 1967, the Shropshire Royal Horse Artillery (raised in 1860 as the 1st Shropshire and Staffordshire Artillery Volunteers) was amalgamated with the Regiment, becoming "A" Squadron.

In 1969, the Regiment was disbanded and replaced by No. 4 Squadron, 35 (South Midlands) Signal Regiment and the Shropshire Yeomanry Cadre. The Cadre was then expanded in 1971 to form the Shropshire Yeomanry Squadron of the Mercian Yeomanry (renamed the Queen's Own Mercian Yeomanry in 1973), with an infantry role in Home Defence.

=== 200 years and 21st century ===
Having celebrated its 200th anniversary in 1995, the Shropshire Yeomanry now survives as D (Shropshire Yeomanry) Squadron of the Royal Yeomanry based in Dawley Bank, Telford. Following the latest defence review, the Squadron became 'light cavalry' and uses the Land Rover RWMIK.

== Regimental museum ==
The Shropshire Regimental Museum, which includes the collections of the King's Shropshire Light Infantry and the Shropshire Yeomanry, is based at Shrewsbury Castle.

== Victoria Cross ==
The Victoria Cross is the highest and most prestigious award for gallantry in the face of the enemy that can be awarded to British and Commonwealth forces. The only Victoria Cross awarded to a member of Shropshire regiment in the First World War was won on 10 March 1918 by Private Harold Whitfield of the Shropshire Yeomanry (10th KSLI) for gallantry at Burj-el-Lisaneh during the Battle of Tell 'Asur in Palestine.

== Battle honours ==
The Shropshire Yeomanry was awarded the following battle honours (honours in bold are emblazoned on the regimental colours):

| Second Boer War | **South Africa 1900–02** | Honorary Distinction from the Second World War, awarded to the Shropshire Yeomanry for service as a Royal Artillery regiment. |
| First World War | **Hindenburg Line**, **Épehy**, **Pursuit to Mons**, **France and Flanders 1918**, **Egypt 1916–17**, **Gaza**, **Jerusalem**, **Jericho**, **Tell 'Asur**, **Palestine 1917–18** | Honorary Distinction from the Second World War, awarded to the Shropshire Yeomanry for service as a Royal Artillery regiment. |
| Second World War | The Royal Artillery was present in nearly all battles and would have earned most of the honours awarded to cavalry and infantry regiments. In 1833, William IV awarded the motto Ubique (meaning "everywhere") in place of all battle honours. Honorary Distinction: Badge of the Royal Regiment of Artillery with year-dates "1943–45" and two scrolls: "Sicily" and "Italy" | Honorary Distinction from the Second World War, awarded to the Shropshire Yeomanry for service as a Royal Artillery regiment. |

== Uniforms ==
In 1872, the newly amalgamated Shropshire Yeomanry Cavalry adopted a heavy dragoon style dark-blue uniform with red facings plus silver and bronze spiked helmet. A white over scarlet plume was worn for parade. The features of the new uniform were drawn from those of the two former regiments following extended discussions between the officers of both. While many Yeomanry regiments simplified their dress uniforms following the South African War, the Shropshire Yeomanry retained the full blue and red review order for ceremonial dress. Khaki cavalry service dress was worn for most duties in the years preceding World War I, and the standard battle dress after the 1940 conversion to artillery.

== See also ==
- List of Yeomanry Regiments 1908
- British yeomanry during the First World War
- Second line yeomanry regiments of the British Army
- List of British Army Yeomanry Regiments converted to Royal Artillery

== Bibliography ==
- Becke, Archibald F. (1936). Order of Battle of Divisions Part 2A. The Territorial Force Mounted Divisions and the 1st-Line Territorial Force Divisions (42–56). London: HMSO. OCLC 4405016.
- Becke, Archibald F. (1937). Order of Battle of Divisions Part 2B. The 2nd-Line Territorial Force Divisions (57th–69th) with The Home-Service Divisions (71st–73rd) and 74th and 75th Divisions. London: HMSO. OCLC 4405016.
- Gladstone, E.W. (1953). The Shropshire Yeomanry, 1795-1945: The Story of a Volunteer Cavalry Regiment. Manchester: Whitethorn.
- James, Brigadier E.A. (1978). British Regiments 1914–18. London: Samson Books Limited. ISBN 0-906304-03-2.
- Mileham, Patrick (1994). The Yeomanry Regiments; 200 Years of Tradition. Edinburgh: Canongate Academic. ISBN 1-898410-36-4.
- Rinaldi, Richard A (2008). Order of Battle of the British Army 1914. Ravi Rikhye. ISBN 978-0-97760728-0.
