= 58th Divisional Trench Mortar Brigade =

- Active: December 1916-April 1919
- Country: United Kingdom
- Branch: Territorial Force
- Type: Mortar Brigade
- Part of: 58th (2/1st London) Division
- Engagements: Arras; Vimy Ridge; Bullecourt; Langemarck; Menin Road Ridge; German spring offensive Épehy; Hundred Days Offensive

The 58th Divisional Trench Mortar Brigade was a group ('Brigade' in contemporary Royal Artillery parlance) of mortar batteries formed within the British Army's 58th (2/1st London) Division during World War I. Manned by volunteers from the Royal Horse Artillery (RHA) and Royal Field Artillery (RFA) it provided short-range fire support as well as carrying out a variety of other trench warfare duties.

== Background ==
The short-range high-angle fire support provided by mortars proved valuable in the trench warfare of the Western Front. By 1916 the infantry divisions of the British Expeditionary Force serving in France and Flanders included light Trench Mortar Batteries (TMBs) formed within the infantry brigades, and three medium and one heavy TMB at divisional level manned by the artillery.

58th (2/1st London) Division was a 2nd Line formation of the Territorial Force raised after the outbreak of war in August 1914. As with all the 2nd Line formations, the shortage of equipment meant that organisation and training was held up. It was not until December 1916 that the War Office decided that 58th Division was ready to embark for overseas service. At this point, 58th Division formed its Divisional TMBs.

== Organisation ==
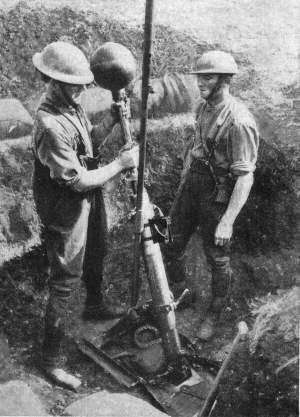
British troops loading a 'Toffee-Apple' bomb into a 2-inch trench mortar with attached periscope post. This appears to be a training exercise because no fuze is visible.

The personnel for the Divisional TMBs were volunteers from one of the division's field artillery units, CCXCIII Brigade (293 Bde; formerly 2/III London Brigade, RFA). This brigade had been brought up to strength during 1916 with the addition of two horse artillery batteries re-equipped with field guns. These were the 1/1st Glamorganshire RHA and 1/1st Shropshire RHA, which had been left in the UK after their parent formations, the South Wales Mounted Brigade and Welsh Border Mounted Brigade respectively, had been sent to Egypt. These batteries still included the brigade ammunition columns for the mounted brigades, which were surplus to requirements because 58th Division already had its own Divisional Ammunition Column. On arrival in France, CCXCIII Bde was completed by the addition of a battery (formerly 2/13th West Lancashire RFA) from 57th (2nd West Lancashire) Division. 58th Divisional TMB Bde therefore included men from London, Lancashire, Shropshire and South Wales, though the largest contingents came from the Glamorgan and Shropshire RHA ammunition columns. (CCXCIII Brigade left 58th Division shortly afterwards, but this did not affect the TMBs.)

The personnel went to France in January 1917 where they were issued with their weapons and trained in their use, joining the division on 1 March 1917. The organisation was as follows:

- Three Medium batteries, each equipped with four 2-inch Medium Mortars firing 60 pound 'Toffee-Apple' projectiles:
  - X.58
  - Y.58
  - Z.58 (broken up on 7–8 February 1918 to bring X and Y batteries up to six mortars each)
- One Heavy trench mortar battery equipped with the 9.45-inch Heavy Mortar firing 120 pound projectiles:
  - V.58 (most men transferred to X and Y batteries 8 February 1918, remainder to III Corps Heavy Trench Mortar Battery on 18 February.)

== Service ==
58th Division's TMBs first went into action at Rivieres, a few miles from Arras, on wire-cutting, where Gunners Gerald Davis and Tom Finch of the Shropshire RHA attached to Y.58 TMB won the Military Medal for continuing to fire their mortar despite their emplacement being subject to heavy counter-bombardment. The batteries' other duties at this time included assisting 18-pounder gun batteries and working at forward ammunition dumps. 58th Divisional TMBs were temporarily attached to 51st (Highland) Division for the Arras Offensive, and acted as stretcher-bearers at the Battle of Vimy Ridge on 9 April 1917. The TMBs were hotly engaged at the subsequent Battle of Bullecourt.

During the 1917 Ypres Offensive the 58th Division was engaged on several occasions. On 17 August, at St Julien during the Battle of Langemarck, the men of the TMBs were rushed up to assist the divisional field artillery, who had suffered serious casualties. Then on 19 September they were engaged in bombarding enemy pillboxes ahead of the assault in the following day's Battle of the Menin Road Ridge. Next day, V.58 battery lost all its mortars and ammunition when a German shell burst in its position, although its crews suffered no casualties.

At Christmas 1917 the medium TMBs were re-equipped with the new Newton 6-inch Mortar, and were reorganised in February 1918 when Z.58 was split up between X.58 and Y.58 to make them six-mortar batteries. At the same time, most of the men of V.58 were also transferred to the medium batteries, while the remainder left the division to form III Corps HTMB.

When the German spring offensive began on 21 March 1918, 58th's TMBs were positioned on the extreme right of the British line at Chauny and lost all their mortars, although casualties were low. Re-equipped, they were in action again at Albert in June, and manned a forward ammunition dump where they came under a German Gas attack. The British Hundred Days Offensive opened on 8 August and the 58th TMBs were in action at Épehy, where they turned captured German Minenwerfers on the enemy with great success. Medium mortars were less useful in mobile warfare, so for the rest of the campaign the TMB men acted as mule drivers for the depleted Divisional Ammunition Column.

After the Armistice with Germany, 58th Division was billeted around the liberated Belgian village of Péruwelz for the winter, where skilled men such as coal-miners were demobilised. The dwindling division moved to Leuze-en-Hainaut in March 1919, and on 4 April the remaining artillery left for England and demobilisation.

== Online sources ==
- The Long, Long Trail
- Shropshire RHA outline history at Shropshire Regimental Museum
