= 1st Mounted Division =

WW1 British Army formation

1st Mounted Division 1st Cyclist Division
- Active: 5 August 1914 – 16 November 1916
- Country: United Kingdom
- Branch: British Army
- Type: Yeomanry; Bicycle infantry
- Size: Division
- Service: World War I

Commanders
- Notable commanders: Edwin Alderson; Robert Broadwood

The 1st Mounted Division was a Yeomanry Division of the British Army active during World War I. It was formed in August 1914 for the home defence of the United Kingdom from four existing mounted brigades of the Territorial Force, each of three regiments of Yeomanry. The divisional order of battle changed often, as the 1st Line (Note: In accordance with the Territorial and Reserve Forces Act 1907 (7 Edw. 7, c.9) which brought the Territorial Force into being, the TF was intended to be a home defence force for service during wartime and members could not be compelled to serve outside the country. However, on the outbreak of war on 4 August 1914, many members volunteered for Imperial Service. Therefore, TF units were split into 1st Line (liable for overseas service) and 2nd Line (home service for those unable or unwilling to serve overseas) units. 2nd Line units performed the home defence role, although most of these were also posted abroad in due course. Likewise, existing pre-war formations (brigades and divisions) formed duplicate 2nd Lines with the same structure as their 1st Line parents.) brigades left for service overseas and were replaced by 2nd Line formations. It was converted to the 1st Cyclist Division in July 1916, and was broken up in November 1916 without being involved in active service. It remained in East Anglia throughout its existence.

An unrelated 1st Mounted Division was formed in July 1916, from the 3rd Mounted Division, lasting until September 1917. Another incarnation of 1st Mounted Division was created in April 1918 from the Yeomanry Mounted Division, lasting until July 1918.

== History ==
=== 1st Mounted Division ===
The Mounted Division was formed on 5 August 1914, immediately after the outbreak of World War I, from four existing mounted brigades of the Territorial Force – Eastern, 1st South Midland, 2nd South Midland, and Notts. and Derby. It was assembled in East Anglia with Headquarters at Bury St Edmunds and the brigades at Ipswich, Diss and two at Bury. The division was to spend its entire existence in East Anglia.

Later in the month, a decision was made to concentrate mounted troops in the Churn area of Berkshire and at the end of August 1914 these were formed into a new 2nd Mounted Division. The original division was designated as 1st Mounted Division and gained three more 1st Line mounted brigades – South Wales, Welsh Border, and North Midland – to replace the 1st South Midland, 2nd South Midland, and Notts. and Derby brigades.

As the 1st Line mounted brigades left for overseas service, they were replaced by 2nd Line formations. As with other 2nd Line divisions – which the 1st Mounted Division was in all but name – the division experienced considerable problems with regard to equipment and personnel. Even as late as July 1915, some Royal Horse Artillery batteries were without guns, wagons or harnesses, machine guns were lacking and few of the men had fired a recruits' course of musketry.

By the beginning of March 1916, the last 1st Line brigades had left and the division was now composed entirely of 2nd Line formations. On 31 March 1916, the remaining mounted brigades were ordered to be numbered in a single sequence and the division now commanded the 1st, 2nd, 3rd and 4th Mounted Brigades.

=== 1st Cyclist Division ===
In July 1916 there was a major reorganization of 2nd Line yeomanry units in the United Kingdom. All but 12 regiments were converted to cyclists: the rest were dismounted, handed over their horses to the remount depots and were issued with bicycles. The 1st Mounted Division was reorganized as the 1st Cyclist Division, now commanding the 1st, 2nd, 3rd and 4th Cyclist Brigades. On reorganization, 2nd Mounted Brigade – with 2/1st Royal 1st Devon, 2/1st Montgomeryshire and 2/1st Fife and Forfar Yeomanry – was posted to the new 1st Mounted Division (3rd Mounted Division redesignated) and remained mounted. In exchange, the 12th Mounted Brigade (2/1st London) joined as the 4th Cyclist Brigade.

A further reorganization in November 1916 saw the 1st Cyclist Division broken up. The cyclist brigades were dispersed and the yeomanry regiments were amalgamated in pairs to form Yeomanry Cyclist Regiments in new cyclist brigades.

=== Other formations ===
Two other divisions of the British Army were named 1st Mounted Division during World War I.

When the original division was converted to a cyclist division in July 1916, the 3rd Mounted Division was renumbered as the 1st Mounted Division as it was the only remaining mounted division. (Note: The 2nd Mounted Division was broken up in Egypt on 21 January 1916 and the 4th Mounted Division was reformed as the 2nd Cyclist Division at the same time that the 1st Mounted Division became the 1st Cyclist Division.) It, too, was converted to cyclists as The Cyclist Division on 4 September 1917.

In March 1918, the 1st Indian Cavalry Division was broken up in France. The British units remained on the Western Front and the Indian elements were sent to Egypt. By an Egyptian Expeditionary Force GHQ Order of 12 April 1918, the mounted troops of the EEF were reorganized when the Indian Army units arrived in theatre. On 24 April 1918, the Yeomanry Mounted Division was indianized (Note: British divisions were converted to the British Indian Army standard whereby brigades only retained one British regiment or battalion and most support units were Indian (artillery excepted).) and its title was changed to 1st Mounted Division. On 22 July 1918, it was renumbered as the 4th Cavalry Division.

== Orders of battle ==
1st Mounted Division – August 1914
On formation immediately after the outbreak of World War I, the 1st Mounted Division commanded the following units:
Eastern Mounted Brigade: 1/1st Suffolk Yeomanry; 1/1st Norfolk Yeomanry; 1/1st Essex Yeomanry (Note: 1/1st Essex Yeomanry left the Eastern Mounted Brigade on 1 December 1914 and joined the 8th Cavalry Brigade in France. It was replaced by 2nd King Edward's Horse.); 2nd King Edward's Horse (Note: 2nd King Edward's Horse replaced 1/1st Essex Yeomanry in Eastern Mounted Brigade in December 1914; it left on 1 February 1915 for the Canadian Cavalry Brigade. In turn, it was replaced by the Welsh Horse Yeomanry in February 1915.)	Royal Horse Artillery (RHA): 1/1st Essex RHA Eastern Ammunition Column; 1/1st Warwickshire RHA 1st South Midland Ammunition Column; 1/1st Berkshire RHA 2nd South Midland Ammunition Column; 1/1st Nottinghamshire RHA Notts. and Derby. Ammunition Column; Royal Engineers Signal Service: Eastern Signal Troop; 1st South Midland Signal Troop; 2nd South Midland Signal Troop; Notts. and Derby. Signal Troop; London Wireless Signal Company; Southern Wireless Signal Company; Scottish Cable Signal Company	Medical: Eastern Field Ambulance, RAMC; 1st South Midland Field Ambulance, RAMC; 2nd South Midland Field Ambulance, RAMC; Notts. and Derby. Field Ambulance, RAMC; Veterinary: Eastern Mobile Veterinary Section; 1st South Midland Mobile Veterinary Section; 2nd South Midland Mobile Veterinary Section; Notts. and Derby. Mobile Veterinary Section; 1st Mounted Division Train: Eastern Transport and Supply Column, ASC; 1st South Midland Transport and Supply Column, ASC; 2nd South Midland Transport and Supply Column, ASC; Notts. and Derby. Transport and Supply Column, ASC; 1st Mounted Division Company, ASC
1st South Midland Mounted Brigade (Note: 1st South Midland Mounted Brigade left for the 2nd Mounted Division in September 1914. It was replaced by the South Wales Mounted Brigade.): 1/1st Warwickshire Yeomanry; 1/1st Royal Gloucestershire Hussars; 1/1st Queen's Own Worcestershire Hussars	Royal Horse Artillery (RHA): 1/1st Essex RHA Eastern Ammunition Column; 1/1st Warwickshire RHA 1st South Midland Ammunition Column; 1/1st Berkshire RHA 2nd South Midland Ammunition Column; 1/1st Nottinghamshire RHA Notts. and Derby. Ammunition Column; Royal Engineers Signal Service: Eastern Signal Troop; 1st South Midland Signal Troop; 2nd South Midland Signal Troop; Notts. and Derby. Signal Troop; London Wireless Signal Company; Southern Wireless Signal Company; Scottish Cable Signal Company
2nd South Midland Mounted Brigade (Note: 2nd South Midland Mounted Brigade left for the 2nd Mounted Division in September 1914. It was replaced by the Welsh Border Mounted Brigade.): 1/1st Royal Buckinghamshire Hussars; 1/1st Queen's Own Oxfordshire Hussars; 1/1st Berkshire Yeomanry	Royal Horse Artillery (RHA): 1/1st Essex RHA Eastern Ammunition Column; 1/1st Warwickshire RHA 1st South Midland Ammunition Column; 1/1st Berkshire RHA 2nd South Midland Ammunition Column; 1/1st Nottinghamshire RHA Notts. and Derby. Ammunition Column; Royal Engineers Signal Service: Eastern Signal Troop; 1st South Midland Signal Troop; 2nd South Midland Signal Troop; Notts. and Derby. Signal Troop; London Wireless Signal Company; Southern Wireless Signal Company; Scottish Cable Signal Company
Nottinghamshire and Derbyshire Mounted Brigade (Note: Nottinghamshire and Derbyshire Mounted Brigade left for the 2nd Mounted Division in September 1914. It was replaced by the North Midland Mounted Brigade.): 1/1st Sherwood Rangers Yeomanry; 1/1st South Nottinghamshire Hussars; 1/1st Derbyshire Yeomanry	Royal Horse Artillery (RHA): 1/1st Essex RHA Eastern Ammunition Column; 1/1st Warwickshire RHA 1st South Midland Ammunition Column; 1/1st Berkshire RHA 2nd South Midland Ammunition Column; 1/1st Nottinghamshire RHA Notts. and Derby. Ammunition Column; Royal Engineers Signal Service: Eastern Signal Troop; 1st South Midland Signal Troop; 2nd South Midland Signal Troop; Notts. and Derby. Signal Troop; London Wireless Signal Company; Southern Wireless Signal Company; Scottish Cable Signal Company
Attached: 1/6th (Cyclist) Battalion, Norfolk Regiment; 1/6th (Cyclist) Battalion, Suffolk Regiment; 1/6th (Cyclist) Battalion, Royal Sussex Regiment; 1/25th (Cyclist) Battalion, London Regiment	Royal Horse Artillery (RHA): 1/1st Essex RHA Eastern Ammunition Column; 1/1st Warwickshire RHA 1st South Midland Ammunition Column; 1/1st Berkshire RHA 2nd South Midland Ammunition Column; 1/1st Nottinghamshire RHA Notts. and Derby. Ammunition Column; Royal Engineers Signal Service: Eastern Signal Troop; 1st South Midland Signal Troop; 2nd South Midland Signal Troop; Notts. and Derby. Signal Troop; London Wireless Signal Company; Southern Wireless Signal Company; Scottish Cable Signal Company

1st Mounted Division – September 1914 to September 1915
The 1st Mounted Division had the following structure after the departure of three of the original brigades to the 2nd Mounted Division and before the 1st Line mounted brigades started to be replaced by 2nd Line formations:
Eastern Mounted Brigade (Note: Eastern Mounted Brigade was dismounted in September 1915 and departed for ANZAC Cove, Gallipoli where it was attached to the 54th (East Anglian) Division. It was replaced by the 2/1st South Wales Mounted Brigade.): 2nd King Edward's Horse; 1/1st Suffolk Yeomanry; 1/1st Norfolk Yeomanry; 1/1st Welsh Horse Yeomanry (Note: 1/1st Welsh Horse Yeomanry replaced 1/1st Leicestershire Yeomanry in North Midland Mounted Brigade in early 1915. It transferred to the Eastern Mounted Brigade in February 1915, replacing 2nd King Edward's Horse.)	Royal Artillery: 1/1st Essex RHA Eastern Ammunition Column; 1/1st Glamorganshire RHA South Wales Ammunition Column; 1/1st Shropshire RHA Welsh Border Ammunition Column; 1/1st Leicestershire RHA North Midland Ammunition Column; 117th Heavy Battery, RGA; 41st Siege Battery, RGA; RE Signal Service: Eastern Signal Troop; South Wales Signal Troop; Welsh Border Signal Troop; North Midland Signal Troop; London Wireless Signal Company; Scottish A.T. Signal Company; Southern Command A.T. Signal Company	Medical: Eastern Field Ambulance, RAMC; South Wales Field Ambulance, RAMC; Welsh Border Field Ambulance, RAMC; North Midland Field Ambulance, RAMC; Veterinary: Eastern Mobile Veterinary Section; South Wales Mobile Veterinary Section; Welsh Border Mobile Veterinary Section; North Midland Mobile Veterinary Section; 1st Mounted Division Train: Eastern Transport and Supply Column, ASC; South Wales Transport and Supply Column, ASC; Welsh Border Transport and Supply Column, ASC; North Midland Transport and Supply Column, ASC; 1st Mounted Division Company, ASC
South Wales Mounted Brigade (Note: South Wales Mounted Brigade replaced the 1st South Midland Mounted Brigade in September 1914. It was dismounted in March 1916 and departed for Egypt. It was replaced, in turn, by the 2/1st Eastern Mounted Brigade.): 1/1st Pembroke Yeomanry; 1/1st Montgomeryshire Yeomanry; 1/1st Glamorgan Yeomanry	Royal Artillery: 1/1st Essex RHA Eastern Ammunition Column; 1/1st Glamorganshire RHA South Wales Ammunition Column; 1/1st Shropshire RHA Welsh Border Ammunition Column; 1/1st Leicestershire RHA North Midland Ammunition Column; 117th Heavy Battery, RGA; 41st Siege Battery, RGA; RE Signal Service: Eastern Signal Troop; South Wales Signal Troop; Welsh Border Signal Troop; North Midland Signal Troop; London Wireless Signal Company; Scottish A.T. Signal Company; Southern Command A.T. Signal Company
Welsh Border Mounted Brigade (Note: Welsh Border Mounted Brigade replaced the 2nd South Midland Mounted Brigade in September 1914. It was dismounted in March 1916 and departed for Egypt. It was replaced, in turn, by the 2/1st Welsh Border Mounted Brigade.): 1/1st Shropshire Yeomanry; 1/1st Cheshire Yeomanry; 1/1st Denbighshire Hussars	Royal Artillery: 1/1st Essex RHA Eastern Ammunition Column; 1/1st Glamorganshire RHA South Wales Ammunition Column; 1/1st Shropshire RHA Welsh Border Ammunition Column; 1/1st Leicestershire RHA North Midland Ammunition Column; 117th Heavy Battery, RGA; 41st Siege Battery, RGA; RE Signal Service: Eastern Signal Troop; South Wales Signal Troop; Welsh Border Signal Troop; North Midland Signal Troop; London Wireless Signal Company; Scottish A.T. Signal Company; Southern Command A.T. Signal Company
North Midland Mounted Brigade (Note: North Midland Mounted Brigade replaced the Nottinghamshire and Derbyshire Mounted Brigade in September 1914. It left in October 1915, mounted, for Salonika but its destination was changed while at sea and it landed in Egypt. It was replaced by its 2nd Line 2/1st North Midland Mounted Brigade.): 1/1st Staffordshire Yeomanry; 1/1st Leicestershire Yeomanry (Note: 1/1st Leicestershire Yeomanry left the North Midland Mounted Brigade on 3 November 1914 and joined the 7th Cavalry Brigade in France. They were replaced by 1/1st Welsh Horse Yeomanry in early 1915.); 1/1st Lincolnshire Yeomanry; 1/1st Welsh Horse Yeomanry; 1/1st East Riding of Yorkshire Yeomanry (Note: 1/1st East Riding of Yorkshire Yeomanry replaced 1/1st Welsh Horse Yeomanry in the North Midland Mounted Brigade in May 1915.)	Royal Artillery: 1/1st Essex RHA Eastern Ammunition Column; 1/1st Glamorganshire RHA South Wales Ammunition Column; 1/1st Shropshire RHA Welsh Border Ammunition Column; 1/1st Leicestershire RHA North Midland Ammunition Column; 117th Heavy Battery, RGA; 41st Siege Battery, RGA; RE Signal Service: Eastern Signal Troop; South Wales Signal Troop; Welsh Border Signal Troop; North Midland Signal Troop; London Wireless Signal Company; Scottish A.T. Signal Company; Southern Command A.T. Signal Company
Attached: 1/6th (Cyclist) Battalion, Norfolk Regiment; 1/6th (Cyclist) Battalion, Suffolk Regiment; 1/6th (Cyclist) Battalion, Royal Sussex Regiment; 1/25th (Cyclist) Battalion, London Regiment	Royal Artillery: 1/1st Essex RHA Eastern Ammunition Column; 1/1st Glamorganshire RHA South Wales Ammunition Column; 1/1st Shropshire RHA Welsh Border Ammunition Column; 1/1st Leicestershire RHA North Midland Ammunition Column; 117th Heavy Battery, RGA; 41st Siege Battery, RGA; RE Signal Service: Eastern Signal Troop; South Wales Signal Troop; Welsh Border Signal Troop; North Midland Signal Troop; London Wireless Signal Company; Scottish A.T. Signal Company; Southern Command A.T. Signal Company

1st Mounted Division – September 1915 to March 1916
The 1st Mounted Division had the following structure after the departure of the last 1st Line mounted brigade and before the mounted brigades were numbered:
2/1st Eastern Mounted Brigade (Note: 2/1st Eastern Mounted Brigade replaced South Wales Mounted Brigade in March 1916. On 20 March 1916 it joined the newly-formed 4th Mounted Division and was replaced by the 2/1st Highland Mounted Brigade.): 2/1st Suffolk Yeomanry; 2/1st Norfolk Yeomanry; 2/1st Essex Yeomanry	Royal Artillery: 2/1st Leicestershire RHA North Midland Ammunition Column; 2/1st Glamorganshire RHA South Wales Ammunition Column; 2/1st Shropshire RHA Welsh Border Ammunition Column; 117th Heavy Battery, RGA; 2/1st Devon Heavy Battery, RGA; Signal Service: 2/1st Eastern Signal Troop; 2/1st North Midland Signal Troop; 2/1st South Wales Signal Troop; 2/1st Welsh Border Signal Troop; 1st Mounted Division Signal Squadron	Medical: 2/1st Eastern Field Ambulance, RAMC; 2/1st North Midland Field Ambulance, RAMC; 2/1st South Wales Field Ambulance, RAMC; 2/1st Welsh Border Field Ambulance, RAMC; Veterinary: 2/1st Eastern Mobile Veterinary Section; 2/1st North Midland Mobile Veterinary Section; 2/1st South Wales Mobile Veterinary Section; 2/1st Welsh Border Mobile Veterinary Section; 1st Mounted Division Train: 2/1st Eastern Transport and Supply Column, ASC; 2/1st North Midland Transport and Supply Column, ASC; 2/1st South Wales Transport and Supply Column, ASC; 2/1st Welsh Border Transport and Supply Column, ASC; 1st Mounted Division Company, ASC
2/1st North Midland Mounted Brigade (Note: 2/1st North Midland Mounted Brigade replaced the North Midland Mounted Brigade in October 1915.): 2/1st Staffordshire Yeomanry; 2/1st Leicestershire Yeomanry; 2/1st Lincolnshire Yeomanry	Royal Artillery: 2/1st Leicestershire RHA North Midland Ammunition Column; 2/1st Glamorganshire RHA South Wales Ammunition Column; 2/1st Shropshire RHA Welsh Border Ammunition Column; 117th Heavy Battery, RGA; 2/1st Devon Heavy Battery, RGA; Signal Service: 2/1st Eastern Signal Troop; 2/1st North Midland Signal Troop; 2/1st South Wales Signal Troop; 2/1st Welsh Border Signal Troop; 1st Mounted Division Signal Squadron
2/1st South Wales Mounted Brigade (Note: 2/1st South Wales Mounted Brigade replaced the Eastern Mounted Brigade in March 1916.): 2/1st Pembroke Yeomanry; 2/1st Montgomeryshire Yeomanry; 2/1st Glamorgan Yeomanry; 2/1st Welsh Horse Yeomanry (Note: 2/1st Welsh Horse Yeomanry joined the 2/1st South Wales Mounted Brigade in July 1915 as a fourth regiment. By May 1916, the regiment had been absorbed into the 2/1st Montgomeryshire Yeomanry.)	Royal Artillery: 2/1st Leicestershire RHA North Midland Ammunition Column; 2/1st Glamorganshire RHA South Wales Ammunition Column; 2/1st Shropshire RHA Welsh Border Ammunition Column; 117th Heavy Battery, RGA; 2/1st Devon Heavy Battery, RGA; Signal Service: 2/1st Eastern Signal Troop; 2/1st North Midland Signal Troop; 2/1st South Wales Signal Troop; 2/1st Welsh Border Signal Troop; 1st Mounted Division Signal Squadron
2/1st Welsh Border Mounted Brigade (Note: 2/1st Welsh Border Mounted Brigade replaced the Welsh Border Mounted Brigade in September 1915. By July 1916, it had left for the Morpeth, Northumberland area and was replaced by the 2/2nd South Western Mounted Brigade.): 2/1st Shropshire Yeomanry; 2/1st Cheshire Yeomanry; 2/1st Denbighshire Hussars	Royal Artillery: 2/1st Leicestershire RHA North Midland Ammunition Column; 2/1st Glamorganshire RHA South Wales Ammunition Column; 2/1st Shropshire RHA Welsh Border Ammunition Column; 117th Heavy Battery, RGA; 2/1st Devon Heavy Battery, RGA; Signal Service: 2/1st Eastern Signal Troop; 2/1st North Midland Signal Troop; 2/1st South Wales Signal Troop; 2/1st Welsh Border Signal Troop; 1st Mounted Division Signal Squadron
Attached (Note: Becke does not show the cyclist battalions as being attached to the division in May or July 1916, but shows them assigned to the cyclist brigades in September 1916. It is reasonable to assume that they remained attached to the division in the interim.): 1/6th (Cyclist) Battalion, Norfolk Regiment; 1/6th (Cyclist) Battalion, Suffolk Regiment; 2/6th (Cyclist) Battalion, Royal Sussex Regiment; 1/25th (Cyclist) Battalion, London Regiment; 2/25th (Cyclist) Battalion, London Regiment	Royal Artillery: 2/1st Leicestershire RHA North Midland Ammunition Column; 2/1st Glamorganshire RHA South Wales Ammunition Column; 2/1st Shropshire RHA Welsh Border Ammunition Column; 117th Heavy Battery, RGA; 2/1st Devon Heavy Battery, RGA; Signal Service: 2/1st Eastern Signal Troop; 2/1st North Midland Signal Troop; 2/1st South Wales Signal Troop; 2/1st Welsh Border Signal Troop; 1st Mounted Division Signal Squadron

1st Mounted Division – March 1916 to July 1916
The 1st Mounted Division had the following structure after the mounted brigades were numbered and before it was converted to a cyclist division:
1st Mounted Brigade (2/1st Highland) (Note: 2/1st Highland Mounted Brigade replaced 2/1st Eastern Mounted Brigade in March 1916. It was numbered as 1st Mounted Brigade on 31 March 1916 and 1st Cyclist Brigade in July 1916.): 2/1st Fife and Forfar Yeomanry (Note: The 2/1st Montgomeryshire Yeomanry and the 2/1st Fife and Forfar Yeomanry joined the 2/1st Royal 1st Devon Yeomanry in the 2nd Mounted Brigade in July 1916. They remained mounted and moved with the brigade to the new 1st Mounted Division.); 2/1st Lovat Scouts; 2/2nd Lovat Scouts	Royal Artillery: 2/1st Leicestershire RHA and Ammunition Column; 2/1st Glamorganshire RHA and Ammunition Column; 2/1st Shropshire RHA and Ammunition Column; 117th Heavy Battery, RGA; Signal Service: 1st Mounted Brigade Signal Troop; 2nd Mounted Brigade Signal Troop; 3rd Mounted Brigade Signal Troop; 4th Mounted Brigade Signal Troop; 1st Mounted Division Signal Squadron; Medical: 1st Mounted Brigade Field Ambulance, RAMC; 2nd Mounted Brigade Field Ambulance, RAMC; 3rd Mounted Brigade Field Ambulance, RAMC; 4th Mounted Brigade Field Ambulance, RAMC; 1st Mounted Division Train: 1st Mounted Brigade Transport and Supply Column, ASC; 2nd Mounted Brigade Transport and Supply Column, ASC; 3rd Mounted Brigade Transport and Supply Column, ASC; 4th Mounted Brigade Transport and Supply Column, ASC; 1st Mounted Division Company, ASC
2nd Mounted Brigade (2/2nd South Western) (Note: 2/2nd South Western Mounted Brigade replaced the 2/1st Welsh Border Mounted Brigade by July 1916. It was numbered as 2nd Mounted Brigade on 31 March 1916. In July 1916, it transferred to the new 1st Mounted Division (3rd Mounted Division redesignated).): 2/1st Royal 1st Devon Yeomanry; 2/1st Royal North Devon Yeomanry; 2/1st West Somerset Yeomanry
3rd Mounted Brigade (2/1st North Midland) (Note: 2/1st North Midland Mounted Brigade was numbered as 3rd Mounted Brigade on 31 March 1916 and 3rd Cyclist Brigade in July 1916.): 2/1st Staffordshire Yeomanry; 2/1st Leicestershire Yeomanry; 2/1st Lincolnshire Yeomanry
4th Mounted Brigade (2/1st South Wales) (Note: 2/1st South Wales Mounted Brigade was numbered as 4th Mounted Brigade on 31 March 1916 and 2nd Cyclist Brigade in July 1916.): 2/1st Pembroke Yeomanry; 2/1st Montgomeryshire Yeomanry; 2/1st Glamorgan Yeomanry
Attached: 1/6th (Cyclist) Battalion, Norfolk Regiment; 1/6th (Cyclist) Battalion, Suffolk Regiment; 2/6th (Cyclist) Battalion, Royal Sussex Regiment; 2/25th (Cyclist) Battalion, London Regiment

1st Cyclist Division – July 1916 to November 1916
The 1st Mounted Division was extensively reorganized to form the 1st Cyclist Division. It had the following structure during its brief existence:
1st Cyclist Brigade (Note: 1st Mounted Brigade (2/1st Highland) was redesignated as 1st Cyclist Brigade in July 1916. 2/1st West Somerset Yeomanry of 2nd Mounted Brigade (2/2nd South Western) exchanged places with 2/1st Fife and Forfar Yeomanry.): 2/1st West Somerset Yeomanry; 2/1st Lovat Scouts; 2/2nd Lovat Scouts; 2/25th (Cyclist) Battalion, London Regiment; 6th Infantry Works Company	Signal Service: 1st Cyclist Brigade Signal Troop; 2nd Cyclist Brigade Signal Troop; 3rd Cyclist Brigade Signal Troop; 4th Cyclist Brigade Signal Troop; 1st Cyclist Division Signal Squadron; Northern Signal Company (A.T.); Medical: 1st Cyclist Brigade Field Ambulance, RAMC; 2nd Cyclist Brigade Field Ambulance, RAMC; 3rd Cyclist Brigade Field Ambulance, RAMC; 4th Cyclist Brigade Field Ambulance, RAMC; 1st Cyclist Division Train: 1st Cyclist Brigade Transport and Supply Column, ASC; 2nd Cyclist Brigade Transport and Supply Column, ASC; 3rd Cyclist Brigade Transport and Supply Column, ASC; 4th Cyclist Brigade Transport and Supply Column, ASC; 1st Cyclist Division Company, ASC
2nd Cyclist Brigade (Note: 4th Mounted Brigade (2/1st South Wales) was redesignated as 2nd Cyclist Brigade in July 1916. 2/1st Royal North Devon Yeomanry of 2nd Mounted Brigade (2/2nd South Western) exchanged places with 2/1st Montgomeryshire Yeomanry.): 2/1st Pembroke Yeomanry; 2/1st Royal North Devon Yeomanry; 2/1st Glamorgan Yeomanry; 1/6th (Cyclist) Battalion, Suffolk Regiment
3rd Cyclist Brigade (Note: 3rd Mounted Brigade (2/1st North Midland) was redesignated as 3rd Cyclist Brigade in July 1916.): 2/1st Staffordshire Yeomanry; 2/1st Leicestershire Yeomanry; 2/1st Lincolnshire Yeomanry; 2/7th (Cyclist) Battalion, Welsh Regiment
4th Cyclist Brigade (Note: 12th Mounted Brigade (2/1st London) of the 3rd Mounted Division joined the division and was redesignated as 4th Cyclist Brigade in July 1916.): 2/1st County of London Yeomanry; 2/1st City of London Yeomanry (Rough Riders); 2/3rd County of London Yeomanry (Sharpshooters); 1/6th (Cyclist) Battalion, Norfolk Regiment

== Commanders ==
The 1st Mounted Division / 1st Cyclist Division had the following commanders:

From	Rank	Name
5 August 1914	Major-General	E. A. H. Alderson
29 September 1914	Lieutenant General	R. G. Broadwood

== See also ==
- List of British divisions in World War I
- British yeomanry during the First World War
- Second line yeomanry regiments of the British Army

== Bibliography ==
- Becke, Major A.F. (1936). Order of Battle of Divisions Part 2A. The Territorial Force Mounted Divisions and the 1st-Line Territorial Force Divisions (42–56). London: His Majesty's Stationery Office.
- James, Brigadier E.A. (1978). British Regiments 1914–18. London: Samson Books Limited. ISBN 0-906304-03-2.
- Perry, F.W. (1993). Order of Battle of Divisions Part 5B. Indian Army Divisions. Newport: Ray Westlake Military Books. ISBN 1-871167-23-X.
- Rinaldi, Richard A (2008). Order of Battle of the British Army 1914. Ravi Rikhye. ISBN 978-0-97760728-0.
- Westlake, Ray (1996). British Regiments at Gallipoli. Barnsley: Leo Cooper. ISBN 0-85052-511-X.
