= Frederick Fryer =

Frederick Fryer may refer to:

- Frederick Fryer (British Army officer)
- Frederick Fryer (cricketer)
- Sir Frederick William Richards Fryer, lieutenant governor of Burma
