= 2/1st Welsh Border Brigade =

2/1st Welsh Border Brigade may refer to:

- 2/1st Welsh Border Mounted Brigade, a 2nd Line Yeomanry cavalry brigade, later numbered as 17th Mounted Brigade
- 205th (2nd Welsh Border) Brigade, a 2nd Line Territorial Force infantry brigade
