= Second line yeomanry regiments of the British Army =

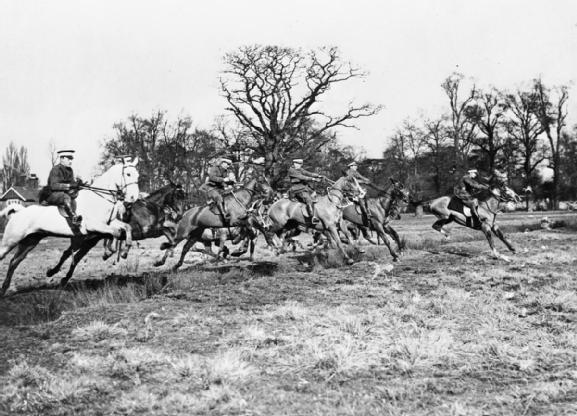
Yeomanry training 1915

Yeomanry are part of the reserve for the British Army. At the start of First World War there were fifty-four yeomanry regiments in the British Army. Soon after the declaration of war, it was decided to increase the number of these volunteer mounted regiments. The new regiments were mirror formations of the existing first line regiments, with the same name and served initially in the same brigades. However they were all classed as second line units. The first line regiments, were numbered the 1/1st while the second line became the 2/1st (regimental name) or in cases where there were more regiments with the same name, or already numbered, the 2/2nd or 2/3rd.

Territorial Force mounted brigades were known by their district name until August 1915, when they became numbered. For most of their existence the second line regiments and brigades were used as a coastal defence force. Most of the second line regiments were converted to cyclist battalions in 1916, and never served in a recognised theatre of war. Several were disbanded and its men transferred to other regiments and one served as an army corps cavalry regiment on the Western Front.

== List ==
Regiment	Brigade	Fate
2/1st Royal Wiltshire Yeomanry (Prince of Wales's Own Royal Regiment)	15th Mounted Brigade	Converted to a cyclist unit in 1916.
2/1st Warwickshire Yeomanry	10th Mounted Brigade	In March 1918 all those fit sent to France as replacements.
2/1st Yorkshire Hussars (Alexandra, Princess of Wales's Own)	18th Mounted Brigade	Converted to a cyclist unit in 1916.
2/1st Nottinghamshire Yeomanry (Sherwood Rangers)	9th Mounted Brigade	Converted to a cyclist unit in 1917.
2/1st Staffordshire Yeomanry (Queen's Own Royal Regiment)	3rd Mounted Brigade	Converted into a cyclist unit in 1917.
2/1st Shropshire Yeomanry	17th Mounted Brigade	Converted to a cyclist unit in 1916.
2/1st Ayrshire (Earl of Carrick's Own) Yeomanry	20th Mounted Brigade	Converted to a cyclist unit in 1916.
2/1st Cheshire Yeomanry (Earl of Chester's)	17th Mounted Brigade	Converted to a cyclist unit in 1916.
2/1st Queen's Own Yorkshire Dragoons	18th Mounted Brigade	Converted to a cyclist unit in 1916.
2/1st Leicestershire Yeomanry (Prince Albert's Own)	3rd Mounted Brigade	Converted into a cyclist unit in 1917.
2/1st North Somerset Yeomanry	15th Mounted Brigade	Converted to a cyclist unit in 1916.
2/1st Duke of Lancaster's Own Yeomanry	21st Mounted Brigade	Converted to a cyclist unit in 1916.
2/1st Lanarkshire Yeomanry	20th Mounted Brigade	Converted into a cyclist unit in 1916.
2/1st Northumberland Hussars		Became the XIX Corps Cavalry Regiment then converted to the 9th (Northumberland Hussars Yeomanry) Battalion, Northumberland Fusiliers in September 1917.
2/1st South Nottinghamshire Hussars	9th Mounted Brigade	Converted into a cyclist unit in 1917.
2/1st Denbighshire Hussars	17th Mounted Brigade	Converted into a cyclist unit in 1916.
2/1st Westmorland and Cumberland Yeomanry	21st Mounted Brigade	Converted into a cyclist unit in 1916.
2/1st Pembroke Yeomanry	4th Mounted Brigade	Converted into a cyclist unit in 1916.
2/1st Royal East Kent Yeomanry (The Duke of Connaught's Own)	14th Mounted Brigade	Converted into a cyclist unit in 1916.
2/1st Hampshire Yeomanry (Carabiniers)	15th Mounted Brigade	Converted into a cyclist unit in 1916.
2/1st Royal Buckinghamshire Yeomanry	11th Mounted Brigade	Converted to a cyclist unit in 1917.
2/1st Derbyshire Yeomanry	9th Mounted Brigade	Converted to a cyclist unit in 1916.
2/1st Queen's Own Dorset Yeomanry	16th Mounted Brigade	Converted to a cyclist unit in 1917.
2/1st Royal Gloucestershire Hussars	10th Mounted Brigade	Converted to a cyclist unit in 1916.
2/1st Hertfordshire Yeomanry		Converted to a cyclist unit in 1917.
2/1st Berkshire Yeomanry (Hungerford)	11th Mounted Brigade	Converted into a cyclist unit in 1916.
2/1st County of London Yeomanry (Middlesex, Duke of Cambridge's Hussars)	12th Mounted Brigade	Converted into a cyclist unit in 1916.
2/1st Royal 1st Devon Yeomanry	2nd Mounted Brigade	Converted into a cyclist unit in 1916.
2/1st Suffolk Yeomanry (Duke of York's Own Loyal Suffolk Hussars)	13th Mounted Brigade	Converted to a cyclist unit in 1916.
2/1st Royal North Devon Yeomanry	2nd Mounted Brigade	Converted to a cyclist unit in 1916.
2/1st Queen's Own Worcestershire Hussars	10th Mounted Brigade	Converted to a cyclist unit in 1916.
2/1st Queen's Own West Kent Yeomanry	14th Mounted Brigade	Converted to a cyclist unit in 1916.
2/1st West Somerset Yeomanry	2nd Mounted Brigade	Converted to a cyclist unit in 1916.
2/1st Queen's Own Oxfordshire Hussars	11th Mounted Brigade	Converted to a cyclist unit in 1916.
2/1st Montgomeryshire Yeomanry	4th Mounted Brigade	Converted into a cyclist unit in 1916.
2/1st Lothians and Border Horse	20th Mounted Brigade	Converted into a cyclist unit in 1916.
2/1st Queen's Own Royal Glasgow Yeomanry		Disbanded and men taken into the 1st Reserve Cavalry Regiment in February 1918.
2/1st Lancashire Hussars	21st Mounted Brigade	Converted into a cyclist unit in 1916.
2/1st Surrey Yeomanry (Queen Mary's Regiment)	16th Mounted Brigade	Converted to a cyclist unit in 1916.
2/1st Fife and Forfar Yeomanry	1st Mounted Brigade	Converted to a cyclist unit in 1917.
2/1st Norfolk Yeomanry (King's Own Royal Regiment)	13th Mounted Brigade	Converted to a cyclist unit in 1916.
2/1st Sussex Yeomanry	14th Mounted Brigade	Converted into a cyclist unit in 1916.
2/1st Glamorgan Yeomanry	4th Mounted Brigade	Converted into a cyclist unit in 1916.
2/1st Welsh Horse Yeomanry	4th Mounted Brigade (Note: 2/1st Welsh Horse Yeomanry joined the 4th Mounted Brigade as a fourth (extra) regiment.)	Disbanded in 1916, men taken into the 2/1st Montgomeryshire Yeomanry.
2/1st Lincolnshire Yeomanry	3rd Mounted Brigade	Converted into a cyclist unit in 1916.
2/1st City of London Yeomanry (Rough Riders)	12th Mounted Brigade	Converted into a cyclist unit in 1916.
2nd County of London Yeomanry (Westminster Dragoons)		Men transferred to the Tank Corps in 1917.
2/3rd County of London Yeomanry (Sharpshooters)	12th Mounted Brigade	Converted into a cyclist unit in 1916.
2/1st Bedfordshire Yeomanry	16th Mounted Brigade	Disbanded and men transferred to the 1st Reserve Cavalry Regiment in 1917.
2/1st Essex Yeomanry	13th Mounted Brigade	Converted into a cyclist unit in 1917.
2/1st Northamptonshire Yeomanry		One squadron taken over by the Tank Corps, the others by the 6th Reserve Cavalry Regiment in 1917.
2/1st East Riding of Yorkshire Yeomanry	18th Mounted Brigade	Converted into a cyclist unit in 1916.
2/1st Lovat Scouts	1st Mounted Brigade	Converted into a cyclist unit in 1916.
2/2nd Lovat Scouts	1st Mounted Brigade	Converted into a cyclist unit in 1916.
2/1st Scottish Horse	19th Mounted Brigade	Converted into a cyclist unit in 1916.
2/2nd Scottish Horse	19th Mounted Brigade	Converted into a cyclist unit in 1916.
2/3rd Scottish Horse	19th Mounted Brigade	Converted into a cyclist unit in 1916.

== Bibliography ==
- James, Brigadier E.A. (1978). British Regiments 1914–18. London: Samson Books Limited. ISBN 0-906304-03-2.
- Rinaldi, Richard A (2008). Order of Battle of the British Army 1914. Ravi Rikhye. ISBN 978-0-97760728-0.
- Westlake, Ray (1992). British Territorial Units 1914–18. Vol. 245 of Men-at-Arms Series. Osprey Publishing. ISBN 978-1-85532-168-7.
