= Harold Whitfield =

Recipient of the Victoria Cross

Harold Edward Whitfield
- Born: 10 June 1886; Oswestry, Shropshire, England
- Died: 19 December 1956 (aged 70)
- Burial place: Oswestry Cemetery, Oswestry, Shropshire, England
- Military career
- Allegiance: United Kingdom
- Branch: British Army
- Service years: 1908–1934
- Rank: Squadron Sergeant Major
- Service number: 230199
- Units: King's Shropshire Light Infantry; Shropshire Yeomanry
- Conflicts: World War I
- Awards: Victoria Cross

Squadron Sergeant Major Harold Edward Whitfield VC (10 June 1886 − 19 December 1956) was a British Army soldier and an English recipient of the Victoria Cross (VC), the highest and most prestigious award for gallantry in the face of the enemy that can be awarded to British and Commonwealth forces.

== Background ==
Born in Oswestry, Shropshire, in June 1886, Whitfield joined the Shropshire Yeomanry in 1908. When World War I broke out in 1914 he was mobilized spending the next two years in England. In 1916 he was shipped to Egypt, his unit becoming part of the Egyptian Expeditionary Force. He was now a member of the 10th Battalion of the King's Shropshire Light Infantry as his unit had been re-designated.

=== Citation ===
Whitfield was 31 years old, and a private in the 10th Battalion, The King's Shropshire Light Infantry, British Army during the First World War Battle of Tell 'Asur when the following deed took place for which he was awarded the VC.

On 10 March 1918 at Burj El Lisaneh, Egypt, during the first of three counter-attacks made by the enemy on the position which had just been captured by his battalion, Private Whitfield, single-handed, charged and captured a Lewis gun, killed the whole gun team of three and turned the gun on the enemy, driving them back with heavy casualties. Later he organised and led a bombing attack on the enemy, again inflicting many casualties and by establishing his party in their position saved many lives and materially assisted in the defeat of the counter-attack.

== Further information ==
He later achieved the rank of squadron sergeant major.

In civilian life, he was a farmer. After giving up business, he worked at Express Dairies at Whittington, Shropshire until his death, aged 70. He died from head injuries received in a road accident three days earlier when, cycling after work to his home in Lord Street, Oswestry, his machine was hit from behind by an army Jeep.

His medals are held by the Shropshire Regimental Museum in Shrewsbury Castle.
