= 6th Cyclist Brigade =

2/1st Welsh Border Mounted Brigade 17th Mounted Brigade 10th Cyclist Brigade 6th Cyclist Brigade
- Active: January 1915–1918
- Country: United Kingdom
- Branch: British Army
- Type: Yeomanry; Bicycle infantry
- Size: Brigade
- Service: World War I

The 17th Mounted Brigade previously known as the 2/1st Welsh Border Mounted Brigade was a 2nd Line yeomanry brigade of the British Army during the First World War. In July 1916 it was converted to a cyclist formation as 10th Cyclist Brigade and in November 1916 was redesignated as 6th Cyclist Brigade. It was still in existence, in Ireland, at the end of the war.

== Mounted Brigade ==
In accordance with the Territorial and Reserve Forces Act 1907 (7 Edw.7, c.9) which brought the Territorial Force into being, the TF was intended to be a home defence force for service during wartime and members could not be compelled to serve outside the country. However, on the outbreak of war on 4 August 1914, many members volunteered for Imperial Service. Therefore, TF units were split in August and September 1914 into 1st Line (liable for overseas service) and 2nd Line (home service for those unable or unwilling to serve overseas) units. Later, a 3rd Line was formed to act as a reserve, providing trained replacements for the 1st and 2nd Line regiments. Similarly, by 1915 most 2nd Line yeomanry regiments were formed into 2nd Line mounted brigades with the same title and composition as the pre-war 1st Line formations. Two other 2nd Line brigades (2/1st Southern Mounted Brigade and 2/1st Western Mounted Brigade) without 1st Line antecedents were also formed.

2/1st Welsh Border Mounted Brigade was a mirror formation of the 1st Line Welsh Border Mounted Brigade. It was formed in the Newcastle area of Northumberland in January 1915 (Note: 2/1st Denbighshire Hussars joined the brigade in January 1915. Br-Gen M.O. Little was assigned to command on 20 January 1915, so it is likely that the brigade was formed on that date.) under the command of Brigadier-General M.O. Little. (Note: Becke shows the commander as Br-Gen M.D. Little, but this is probably a typo.) It had under command the 2/1st Shropshire Yeomanry, the 2/1st Cheshire Yeomanry, and the 2/1st Denbighshire Hussars and was placed under the command of the 63rd (2nd Northumbrian) Division.

On 31 March 1916, the remaining Mounted Brigades were ordered to be numbered in a single sequence and the brigade became 17th Mounted Brigade, still in Northumberland under Northern Command.

In April 1916, the brigade joined the 1st Mounted Division in East Anglia where it replaced its 1st Line which had departed (dismounted) for Egypt. At this time, the brigade also commanded 2/1st Shropshire Royal Horse Artillery and ammunition column, a signal troop, a Field Ambulance, RAMC, a mobile veterinary section and a Transport and Supply Column, ASC. By July it had left for the Morpeth, Northumberland area.

== Cyclist Brigade ==
In July 1916 there was a major reorganization of 2nd Line yeomanry units in the United Kingdom. All but 12 regiments were converted to cyclists and as a consequence the brigade was converted to 10th Cyclist Brigade. Further reorganization in October and November 1916 saw the brigade redesignated as 6th Cyclist Brigade in November, still in the Morpeth area. At this time the 2/1st Denbighshire Yeomanry departed for the 1st Cyclist Brigade at Beccles in Suffolk where it was amalgamated with the 2/1st Montgomeryshire Yeomanry as the 3rd (Montgomery and Denbigh Yeomanry) Cyclist Battalion. It was replaced by the 2/1st Fife and Forfar Yeomanry, which was stationed at Ashington.

In March 1917, 2/1st Shropshire Yeomanry moved to Newbiggin, and later to Woodhorn near Morpeth. In July, 2/1st Fife and Forfar Yeomanry and 2/1st Cheshire Yeomanry moved to Acklington.

Early in 1918 the Brigade moved to Ireland and was stationed at the Curragh. It was joined there by the 2/1st Queen's Own Dorset Yeomanry and the 2/1st Essex Yeomanry. 1/6th (Cyclist) Battalion, Royal Sussex Regiment at Tralee, later at Limerick, was also attached to the brigade. There were no further changes before the end of the war.

== See also ==
- Welsh Border Mounted Brigade for the 1st Line formation
- British yeomanry during the First World War
- Second line yeomanry regiments of the British Army

== Bibliography ==
- Becke, Archibald F. (1936). Order of Battle of Divisions Part 2A. The Territorial Force Mounted Divisions and the 1st-Line Territorial Force Divisions (42–56). London: HMSO. OCLC 4405016.
- Becke, Archibald F. (1937). Order of Battle of Divisions Part 2B. The 2nd-Line Territorial Force Divisions (57th–69th) with The Home-Service Divisions (71st–73rd) and 74th and 75th Divisions. London: HMSO. OCLC 4405016.
- James, Brigadier E.A. (1978). British Regiments 1914–18. London: Samson Books Limited. ISBN 0-906304-03-2.
- Rinaldi, Richard A (2008). Order of Battle of the British Army 1914. Ravi Rikhye. ISBN 978-0-97760728-0.
