= Frederick Fryer (British Army officer) =

British Army general (1871–1943)

Brigadier-General Frederick Fryer DL JP
- Born: Frederick Fryer; 13 August 1871
- Died: 23 September 1943 (aged 72)
- Military career
- Allegiance: United Kingdom
- Branch: British Army
- Rank: Brigadier-General
- Unit: 6th (Inniskilling) Dragoons
- Commands: 6th (Inniskilling) Dragoons; South Wales Mounted Brigade; 22nd Mounted Brigade
- Conflicts: Second Boer War; First World War
- Other work: Deputy Lieutenant of the County of Dorset; Justice of the Peace

Brigadier-General Frederick Arthur Bashford Fryer DL JP (13 August 1871 – 23 September 1943 ) was a British Army cavalry officer in the 6th (Inniskilling) Dragoons.

He served in the Second Boer War and the First World War, commanding his regiment and two mounted brigades. In later life he became a Deputy Lieutenant of Dorset and a Justice of the Peace.

== Career ==
Fryer was born 13 August 1871, the eldest son of Frederick William Richard Fryer and Frances Elizabeth (née Bashford). He graduated from the Royal Military College Sandhurst and became a second-lieutenant in the 6th (Inniskilling) Dragoons in October 1890. His first promotion to lieutenant was in February 1892, then in 1897 he became the Aide de Camp to his father the Lieutenant Governor of Burma. In February 1899 he was promoted to captain,

Fryer served in the Second Boer War, becoming Provost Marshal in October 1899, after which he was promoted to major in January 1903. A year late he married Frances Esme Balfe, together they would have five children.

He was promoted to lieutenant-colonel and commanding officer of the 6th Dragoons in July 1908, until July 1912 when he completed his time in command and went onto the half pay list.

He remained on the half pay list until January 1913, when he was promoted and given command of a yeomanry formation, of the Territorial Force, the South Wales Mounted Brigade.

The brigade as part of the 2nd Mounted Division served in the Gallipoli campaign. Fryer survived that conflict and then moved to Egypt, as commander of the 22nd Mounted Brigade and fought in the Sinai and Palestine campaign. In the Middle East Fryer was promoted to temporary brigadier-general and rank he held until reverting to his substantive rank of colonel in March 1920.

Following the war Brigadier-General Fryer settled at Shroton House, Iwerne Courtney, Blandford Forum in Dorset. He was appointed a Deputy Lieutenant of the County of Dorset and also a Justice of the Peace. Until he died 23 September 1943.
