= 4th Mounted Brigade (United Kingdom) =

- Active: 1914–1916
- Country: United Kingdom
- Branch: British Army
- Type: Yeomanry
- Size: Brigade
- Engagements: First World War

The 4th Mounted Brigade previously known as the 2/1st South Wales Mounted Brigade was a second line yeomanry brigade of the British Army during the First World War.

Raised after the declaration of war, it was a mirror formation of the first line South Wales Mounted Brigade. It had under command the 2/1st Pembroke Yeomanry, the 2/1st Montgomeryshire Yeomanry, the 2/1st Welsh Horse Yeomanry and the 2/1st Glamorgan Yeomanry. All of which were converted in cyclist units in 1916, the brigade, never having seen any active service, ceased to exist.

== See also ==
- South Wales Mounted Brigade for the 1st Line formation
- British yeomanry during the First World War
- Second line yeomanry regiments of the British Army
