= Ammunition column =

An Ammunition Column was a support echelon of a British or Dominion brigade or division during the First World War and consisted of dedicated military vehicles carrying artillery and small arms ammunition for the combatant unit to which the column belonged, generally an Artillery Brigade or a Divisional Artillery.

Thus, the Ammunition Columns of a division, formed of the brigades of field artillery, carry reserve ammunition for the guns, the machine guns of the infantry and the rifles of all arms. Generally speaking, the Brigade Ammunition Column of the Artillery Brigades furnishes ammunition for its own batteries and for one of the brigades of infantry, and each is supported by a Divisional Artillery.

From the start of World War I, as they were newly established, BEF/Dominion Infantry Divisions came to be assigned a Divisional Artillery of three Field Artillery Brigades and one (Field) Howitzer Brigade, each Brigade having four batteries and a ‘Brigade Ammunition Column’. The British Army Divisional Artillery pre-WW1 included an additional Heavy 60-Pounder Battery. A Cavalry Division had two Horse Artillery Brigades each with 12 × 13-PDR guns. As warfare progressed and the tank was introduced the demands of ammunition supply to armored formations called for the development of like structures.

== The British Army and Dominion Artillery prior to May 1916 ==
Ammunition Columns, Brigade or Divisional, were officered and manned by the Royal Artillery and national equivalents. Intended for direct affiliation to their Brigades, and Divisions, they were additionally called upon to furnish ammunition to any unit requiring it during an action. The Officers and Gunners of the R.A. employed with an Ammunition Column were, as a matter of course, immediately available to replace casualties in the batteries. Working mostly at night, moving forward, the Brigade Ammunition Columns ammunition wagons were interchangeable with a Firing Batteries own ammunition wagons (one per gun), so full wagons could be easily dropped-off, being unhooked and taken away for reloading.

The Horse Artillery and Heavy Brigades of Artillery each had their own Brigade Ammunition Column (BAC), organized in much the same way and performing similar duties. The Brigade Ammunition Column of the Heavy Brigade was divisible into three sections, so that the three batteries, if operating independently, have each a section at hand to replenish the ammunition expended. The Horse Artillery Brigade Ammunition Columns carried, besides S.A.A. for corps troops, other than artillery, the reserve of pom-pom ammunition. The Field Brigade Ammunition Column numbered 158 heads, commanded by a captain, with three Lieutenants or Second Lieutenants.

The Howitzer Brigade Ammunition Column (BAC) included ammunition wagons (with limber), one wagon per howitzer, and one GS wagon for stores, with at least 132 horses (riding and draft, using six per wagon). The Columns operational task was to have available a constant supply, and bring forward, forty-eight rounds per howitzer, to a firing Batterys entrenched position, or to supply it to the Batterys own ammunition wagon lines. The Howitzer BAC was divided into two sections, they commanded by Lieutenants, each tasked to two Batteries, and included a Battery Sergeant-Major, a Battery Quartermaster Sergeant, a Farrier-Sergeant, Shoeing Smiths (of which 1 would be a Corporal), 2 Saddlers (driver equipment), 2 Wheel-Wrights, a Trumpeter, 4 Sergeants, 5 Corporals, 5 Bombardiers, 3 Gunners acting as Batmen, Signalers, Drivers, and The Gunners.

Some miles to the rear were the Divisional Ammunition Columns, which on the one hand replenish the empty wagons of the Columns in front, and on the other draw fresh supplies from the depots on the line of communication. The Divisional Ammunition Columns also are in artillery charge; to replenish each of Brigade Ammunition Columns. An Infantry Division, Divisional Artillery, and Divisional Ammunition Column was organized around three Field Artillery Sections, and a fourth Howitzer Section, bringing forward scaled levels of field artillery, howitzer, and small arms ammunition, for each of the Brigade Columns. According to the April 1915 War Establishment Organization Tables: New Army (40/WO/2425), it would have 12 Officers, 1 Warrant Officer, 10 Sergeants, 32 Artificers and 473 Other Ranks: Total 528 (and a Base Detachment of 49); seeing some 140 in No, 1,2,3 Sections and 84 in No. 4 Section plus a total of 683 horses. The Fifth Section: Heavy Portion for 60-pounder ammunition, were removed from the BEF DAC establishment in early in 1915 when the 60-pdr guns were withdrawn from Divisions.

The Divisional Ammunition Column collected ammunition from the Army Service Corps Divisional Ammunition Park, as the higher movement and supply of ammunition was coordinated at Corps level. A second scale of ammunition was stored in the Divisional Ammunition Park whilst a third scale was stored in the Corps Ammunition Park, which received and held replenishment from the Corps Ordnance Depot. Mechanical transport companies of the Army Service Corps carried out ammunition supply for RGA Heavy and Siege Batteries, given one company was included within each Army and Corps.

The Brigade Ammunition Columns and Divisional Ammunition Columns thus carried ordinarily seven or eight kinds at least of field, horse, howitzer and heavy gun shrapnel, howitzer and heavy gun lyddite shells, cartridges for the four different guns employed and pom-pom cartridges for the cavalry, in all twelve distinct types and varied small arms and machine gun ammunition. Consequently, the rounds of each kind in charge of each ammunition column must vary in accordance with the work expected of the combatant unit to which it belongs.

Thus, pom-pom ammunition is out of place in the Brigade Ammunition Columns of field artillery, and S.A.A. is relatively unnecessary in that attached to a Heavy Artillery Brigade. Under these circumstances, a column may be unable to meet the unique wants of troops engaged in the vicinity; for instance, a cavalry regiment would send in vain to a heavy artillery ammunition column for pom-pom cartridges. The point to be observed in this is that the fewer the natures of weapons used, the more certain is the ammunition supply.

== The British Army and Dominion Artillery after May 1916 ==
On 13 May 1916, originating from BEF GHQ, orders were issued for the reorganization of Royal and Dominion/Indian Divisional Artillery establishments, they were to be restructured having four ‘mixed’ Artillery Brigades, to a standardized / universal establishment, each being allocated three Field Artillery Batteries and one Howitzer Battery. This ‘operational decision’ additionally saw the abolition of the four integral ‘Brigade Ammunition Columns’ and they being broken up or absorbed into their supporting ‘Divisional Ammunition Column’.

Having to absorb three Field BACs and a Howitzer BAC, the DAC would take on additional authorized ammunition wagons, horses and personnel, and excess to establishment personnel would be moved as artilleryman to any of the sixteen gun/howitzer batteries, of the Division. This ‘internal’ reassignment of BAC gunner officers and artilleryman was consistent with past practices, as since 1906, it was an established routine to consider ‘ammunition column’ personnel, as a manning reserve and a source of timely replacements for ‘casualties’ in their brigades batteries.

In the ‘new’ Divisional Artillery ‘universal establishment’ structure, the Divisional Ammunition Columns reorganized around a new supporting model, standing up a dedicated ‘A’ Echelon, and a supporting ‘B’ Echelon. The ‘A’ Echelon comprised four ‘new’ Sections, now doing the work of the (four) Brigade Ammunition Columns, one for each of the Divisions mixed Artillery Brigades. Each common A Section, had the same task of bringing forward ‘first-line’ artillery ammunition, and small arms ammunition, to the batteries of an affiliated Artillery and Infantry Brigade, as previously did a Field BACs.

When the DACs absorbed the RFA BACs in May 1916, the DAC Establishment increased to 16 officers and about 800 men. In January 1917, when the Divisional Artillery was reduced to two brigades, the numbers in the DAC were reduced to 15 and about 700, and later in 1917 to 15 and about 600. By August 1918, they had further reduced to 15 and 569.
