= Welsh Border Mounted Brigade =

- Active: 1908–March 1916
- Country: United Kingdom
- Branch: British Army
- Type: Yeomanry
- Size: Brigade
- HQ (peacetime): Shrewsbury
- Engagements: World War I

The Welsh Border Mounted Brigade was a formation of the Territorial Force of the British Army, organised in 1908. After home defence service, it was posted to Egypt, where it was absorbed into the 4th Dismounted Brigade in March 1916.

== Formation ==
Under the terms of the Territorial and Reserve Forces Act 1907 (7 Edw.7, c.9), the brigade was formed in 1908 as part of the Territorial Force. It consisted of three yeomanry regiments, a horse artillery battery and ammunition column, a transport and supply column and a field ambulance. Three other yeomanry regiments (the Duke of Lancaster's Own Yeomanry, the Westmorland and Cumberland Yeomanry and the Lancashire Hussars Yeomanry) were attached for training in peacetime.

As the name suggests, the units were drawn from the areas adjacent to both sides of the England–Wales border, notably Denbighshire (Wales), Cheshire and Shropshire (both England).

== World War I ==
The brigade was mobilised on 4 August 1914 at the outbreak of the First World War and moved to East Anglia. It joined the 1st Mounted Division in September 1914, replacing 2nd South Midland Mounted Brigade which moved to 2nd Mounted Division. In November 1915, the brigade was dismounted. It was replaced in 1st Mounted Division by 2/1st Welsh Border Mounted Brigade when it departed for Egypt.

=== Egypt ===
The brigade was posted to Egypt in March 1916. On 20 March, Welsh Border Mounted Brigade was absorbed into the 4th Dismounted Brigade (along with the South Wales Mounted Brigade). 4th Dismounted Brigade was later renamed as 231st Brigade in the 74th (Yeomanry) Division.

== Commanders ==
The Welsh Border Mounted Brigade was commanded from 4 April 1912 by Colonel E.A. Herbert. He was promoted to brigadier general on 5 August 1914 and remained in command until the brigade was absorbed into 4th Dismounted Brigade. He took command of 4th Dismounted Brigade on formation, and remained in command when the brigade was converted to 231st Brigade.

== See also ==
- 2/1st Welsh Border Mounted Brigade for the 2nd Line formation
- British yeomanry during the First World War

== Bibliography ==
- Becke, Archibald F. (1936). Order of Battle of Divisions Part 2A. The Territorial Force Mounted Divisions and the 1st-Line Territorial Force Divisions (42–56). London: HMSO. OCLC 4405016.
- Becke, Archibald F. (1937). Order of Battle of Divisions Part 2B. The 2nd-Line Territorial Force Divisions (57th–69th) with The Home-Service Divisions (71st–73rd) and 74th and 75th Divisions. London: HMSO. OCLC 4405016.
- James, Brigadier E.A. (1978). British Regiments 1914–18. London: Samson Books Limited. ISBN 0-906304-03-2.
- Rinaldi, Richard A (2008). Order of Battle of the British Army 1914. Ravi Rikhye. ISBN 978-0-9776072-8-0.
- Westlake, Ray (1992). British Territorial Units 1914–18. Osprey Publishing. ISBN 978-1-85532-168-7.
