= South Wales Mounted Brigade =

- Active: 1908 – March 1916
- Country: United Kingdom
- Branch: British Army
- Type: Yeomanry
- Size: Brigade
- HQ (peacetime): Pembroke, Pembrokeshire
- Engagements: World War I

The South Wales Mounted Brigade was a formation of the Territorial Force of the British Army, organised in 1908. After home defence service, it was posted to Egypt, where it was absorbed into the 4th Dismounted Brigade in March 1916.

== History ==
=== Formation ===
Under the terms of the Territorial and Reserve Forces Act 1907 (7 Edw.7, c.9), the brigade was formed in 1908 as part of the Territorial Force. It consisted of three yeomanry regiments, a horse artillery battery and ammunition column, a transport and supply column and a field ambulance.

As the name suggests, the units were drawn from the South Wales area, with the exception of the field ambulance which was based in Hereford, England.

=== Mobilisation for World War I ===
The brigade was mobilised on 4 August 1914 at the outbreak of the First World War, assembled at Hereford and moved to East Anglia by the end of August 1914. It joined the 1st Mounted Division in August 1914, replacing 1st South Midland Mounted Brigade which moved to 2nd Mounted Division. In November 1915, the brigade was dismounted. It was replaced in 1st Mounted Division by 2/1st Eastern Mounted Brigade when it departed for Egypt.

=== Egypt ===
The brigade was posted to Egypt in March 1916. On 20 March, South Wales Mounted Brigade was absorbed into the 4th Dismounted Brigade (along with the Welsh Border Mounted Brigade). 4th Dismounted Brigade was later renamed as 231st Brigade in the 74th (Yeomanry) Division.

== Commanders ==
The South Wales Mounted Brigade was commanded from 1 January 1913 by Colonel Frederick Fryer. He was promoted to brigadier general on 5 August 1914.

== See also ==
- 2/1st South Wales Mounted Brigade for the 2nd Line formation
- British yeomanry during the First World War

== Bibliography ==
- Becke, Archibald F. (1936). Order of Battle of Divisions Part 2A. The Territorial Force Mounted Divisions and the 1st-Line Territorial Force Divisions (42–56). London: HMSO. OCLC 4405016.
- Becke, Archibald F. (1937). Order of Battle of Divisions Part 2B. The 2nd-Line Territorial Force Divisions (57th–69th) with The Home-Service Divisions (71st–73rd) and 74th and 75th Divisions. London: HMSO. OCLC 4405016.
- James, Brigadier E.A. (1978). British Regiments 1914–18. London: Samson Books Limited. ISBN 0-906304-03-2.
- Rinaldi, Richard A (2008). Order of Battle of the British Army 1914. Ravi Rikhye. ISBN 978-0-97760728-0.
- Westlake, Ray (1992). British Territorial Units 1914–18. Osprey Publishing. ISBN 978-1-85532-168-7.
