= Walter Tull =

English footballer (1888–1918)

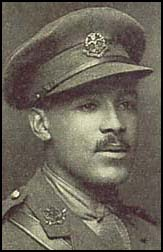
- Born: 28 April 1888; Folkestone, England
- Died: 25 March 1918 (aged 29) near Favreuil, Pas-de-Calais, France
Association football career
- Position: Half back
Senior career*
Years	Team	Apps	(Gls)
1908–1909	Clapton		(11)
1909–1911	Tottenham Hotspur	10	(2)
1911–1914	Northampton Town	105	(9)
1917	Rangers	0	(0)
Total		121+	(22)
- * Club domestic league appearances and goals
- Military career
- Allegiance: United Kingdom
- Branch: British Army
- Service years: 1914–1918
- Rank: Second lieutenant
- Unit: Middlesex Regiment
- Conflicts: World War I

Walter Daniel John Tull (28 April 1888 – 25 March 1918) was an English professional footballer and British Army officer of Afro-Caribbean descent. He played as an inside forward and half back for Clapton, Tottenham Hotspur and Northampton Town and was the third person of mixed heritage to play in the top division of the Football League after Arthur Wharton and Willie Clarke. He was also the first player of African descent to sign for Rangers in 1917, while stationed in Scotland.

During the First World War, Tull served in the Middlesex Regiment, including in the two Footballers' Battalions. He was commissioned as a second lieutenant on 30 May 1917 and killed in action on 25 March 1918.

== Early life ==
Walter Daniel John Tull was born in Folkestone, Kent, the son of Barbadian carpenter Daniel Tull and Kent-born Alice Elizabeth Palmer. His paternal grandfather was a slave in Barbados. His maternal English grandmother was from Kent. He began his education at North Board School, now Mundella Primary School, Folkestone.

In 1895, when Tull was seven, his mother died of cancer. A year later, his father married Alice's cousin, Clara Palmer. She gave birth to a daughter, Miriam, on 11 September 1897. Three months later, Daniel died from heart disease. The stepmother was unable to cope with five children, so the resident minister of Folkestone's Grace Hill Wesleyan Chapel recommended that the two boys of school age, Walter and Edward, should be sent to an orphanage. From the age of nine, Tull was brought up in the Methodist Children's Home and Orphanage (now known as Action for Children) in Bethnal Green, London. Edward was adopted by the Warnock family of Glasgow, becoming Edward Tull-Warnock; he qualified as a dentist, the first mixed-heritage person to practise this profession in the United Kingdom.

== Career ==
Tull's professional football career began after he was spotted playing for top amateur club Clapton. He had signed for Clapton in October 1908, reportedly never playing in a losing side. By the end of the season he had won winners' medals in the FA Amateur Cup, London County Amateur Cup and the London Senior Cup. In March 1909, the Football Star called him "the catch of the season". At Clapton, he played alongside Clyde Purnell and Charlie Rance.

At the age of 21, Tull signed for Football League First Division team Tottenham Hotspur in the summer of 1909 after a close-season tour of Argentina and Uruguay, making him the first mixed-heritage professional footballer to play in Latin America. Tull made his debut for Tottenham in September 1909 in the position of inside forward against Sunderland and his home Football League debut against FA Cup-holders, Manchester United, in front of more than 30,000. His excellent form in this opening part of the season promised a great future. Tull made only 10 first-team appearances, scoring twice, before he was dropped to the reserves. This may have been due to the racial abuse he received from opposing fans, particularly at Bristol City, whose supporters used language "lower than Billingsgate", (Note: The raucous cries of the fish vendors at Billingsgate Fish Market gave rise to "Billingsgate" as a synonym for profanity or offensive language.) according to a report at the time in the Football Star newspaper. The match report of the game away to Bristol City in October 1909 by Football Star reporter, "DD", was headlined "Football and the Colour Prejudice", possibly the first time racial abuse was headlined in a football report. "DD" emphasised how Tull remained professional and composed despite the intense provocation: "He is Hotspur's most brainy forward ... so clean in mind and method as to be a model for all white men who play football ... Tull was the best forward on the field." However, soon after, Tull was dropped from the first team and found it difficult to get a sustained run back in the side. Goodwin writes in The Spurs Alphabet that "whilst a skilful player, he was not considered fast enough for top class football."

Further appearances in the first team (20 in total with four goals) were recorded, before Tull's contract was bought by Southern Football League club Northampton Town on 17 October 1911 for a "substantial fee", plus Charlie Brittain joining Tottenham Hotspur in return. Tull made his debut four days later against Watford, and made 108 first-team appearances (105 in the League), scoring nine goals for the club. The day before the RMS Titanic sank on 15 April 1912, Tull scored four goals in a match against Bristol Rovers. The manager Herbert Chapman, also a Methodist, was a former Spurs player and had played as a young man with Arthur Wharton at Stalybridge Rovers; Chapman went on to manage both Huddersfield Town and Arsenal to FA Cup wins and League championships.

In 1940, an article in the Glasgow Evening Times about Tull being the first "coloured" infantry officer in the British Army reported that he had signed to play for Rangers after the war. Rangers have confirmed that Tull signed for them in February 1917, while he was an officer cadet in Scotland at Gailes, Ayrshire.

== Honours ==
- Clapton
- FA Amateur Cup: 1908
- London County Amateur Cup: 1908
- London Senior Cup: 1908

== First World War ==
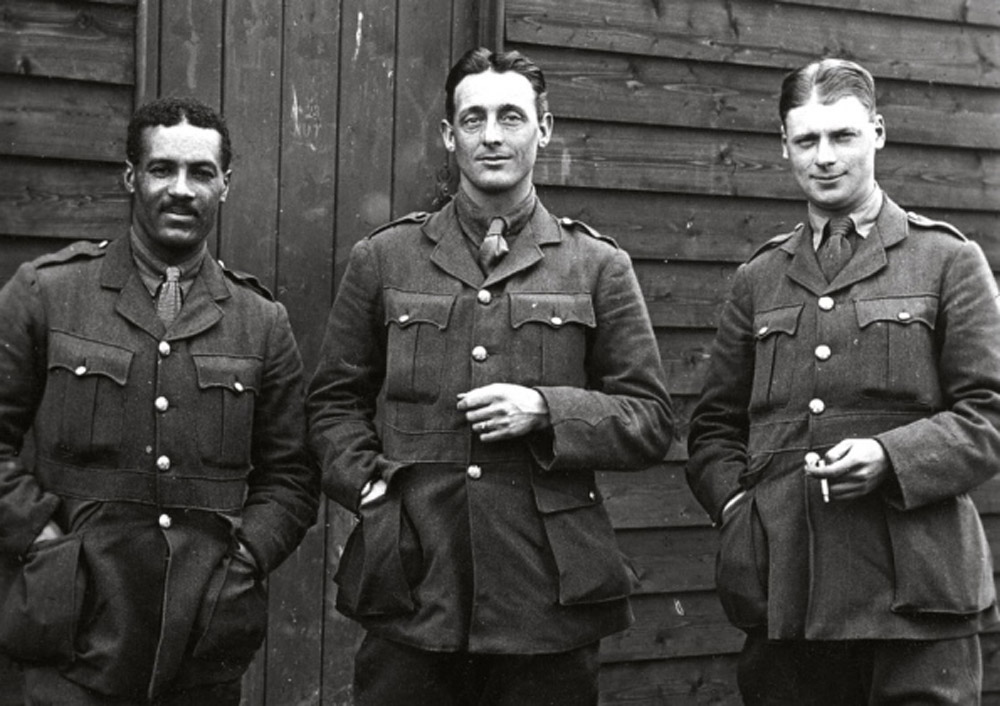
Tull (left) with fellow officers

After the First World War broke out in August 1914, Tull became the first Northampton Town player to enlist in the British Army, in December of that year. Tull served in the two Football Battalions of the Duke of Cambridge's Own (Middlesex) Regiment, the 17th and 23rd, and also in the 5th Battalion. He rose to the rank of lance sergeant and fought in the Battle of the Somme in 1916.

When Tull was commissioned as a second lieutenant on 30 May 1917, he became one of the first mixed-heritage infantry officers in a regular British Army regiment, (Note: Nathaniel Wells, the son of a white plantation owner and a black slave, received a Yeomanry commission in 1818; Allan Noel Minns, DSO, MC, was commissioned in the Royal Army Medical Corps in September 1914, Euan Lucie-Smith (killed in action 25 April 1915) was commissioned in the Royal Warwickshire Regiment in November 1914, George Bemand was commissioned in the Royal Field Artillery in 1915, although on his attestation form he categorises himself as being of "pure European descent"; and David Clemetson was commissioned in the territorial Pembroke Yeomanry in October 1915.) when the 1914 Manual of Military Law excluded soldiers that were not "natural born or naturalised British subjects of pure European descent" from becoming commissioned officers in the Special Reserve.

With the 23rd Battalion, Tull fought on the Italian Front from 30 November 1917 to early March 1918. He was praised for his "gallantry and coolness" by Major-General Sydney Lawford, General Officer Commanding 41st Division, having led 26 men on a night-raiding party, crossing the fast-flowing rapids of the Piave River into enemy territory and returning them unharmed.

Tull and the 23rd Battalion returned to northern France on 8 March 1918. He was killed in action near the village of Favreuil in the Pas-de-Calais on 25 March during the First Battle of Bapaume, the early stages of the German Army's Spring Offensive. His body was never recovered, despite the efforts of, among others, Private Tom Billingham, a former goalkeeper for Leicester Fosse, to return him to the British position while under fire. He is believed to be buried somewhere in the Somme, but historian Andy Robertshaw has indicated he may be buried in an unmarked grave at Heninel-Croisilles Road cemetery.

In a letter of condolence to his family, the commanding officer of the 23rd Battalion, Major Poole and his colleague 2Lt Pickard both said that Tull had been put forward for a Military Cross. Pickard wrote "he had been recommended for the Military Cross, and certainly earned it." However, the Ministry of Defence has no record of any recommendation but many records were lost in a 1940 fire.

== Legacy ==
In the history of mixed-heritage footballers in Britain, Tull may be mentioned alongside: Robert Walker of Third Lanark; Andrew Watson, an amateur who is credited as the earliest black international football player, winning his first cap for Scotland in 1881; Arthur Wharton, a goalkeeper for several clubs, including Darlington, and who became the first mixed-heritage professional in 1889; John Walker of Hearts and Lincoln, who died aged 22; the Anglo-Indian Cother brothers, Edwin and John, who began their careers at Watford in 1898, and Willie Clarke, who played for Aston Villa and Bradford City in the Edwardian era.

From around 2006, campaigners including the then Northampton South MP, Brian Binley, and Phil Vasili, who has researched Tull since the early 1990s, called for a statue to be erected in his honour at Dover and for him to be posthumously awarded the Military Cross. However, as the Military Cross was not authorised to be awarded posthumously until 1979, and the change did not include any provision for retrospective awards, this would not be possible without a change in the rules. The campaigners felt this would be justified given that the army broke the rules. Tull's commission, at a time when the army was desperately short of officers was also due to his natural leadership, coolness and respect of his unit's officers and men. If he had been recommended for a Military Cross, his status as an officer of non-European descent might have meant to award him the honour would validate his status, leading to more mixed-heritage officers being commissioned. A Royal Army Medical Corps officer Allan Noel Minns, also a natural-born British subject of Afro-Caribbean descent, was awarded both DSO and MC.

=== Memorials ===
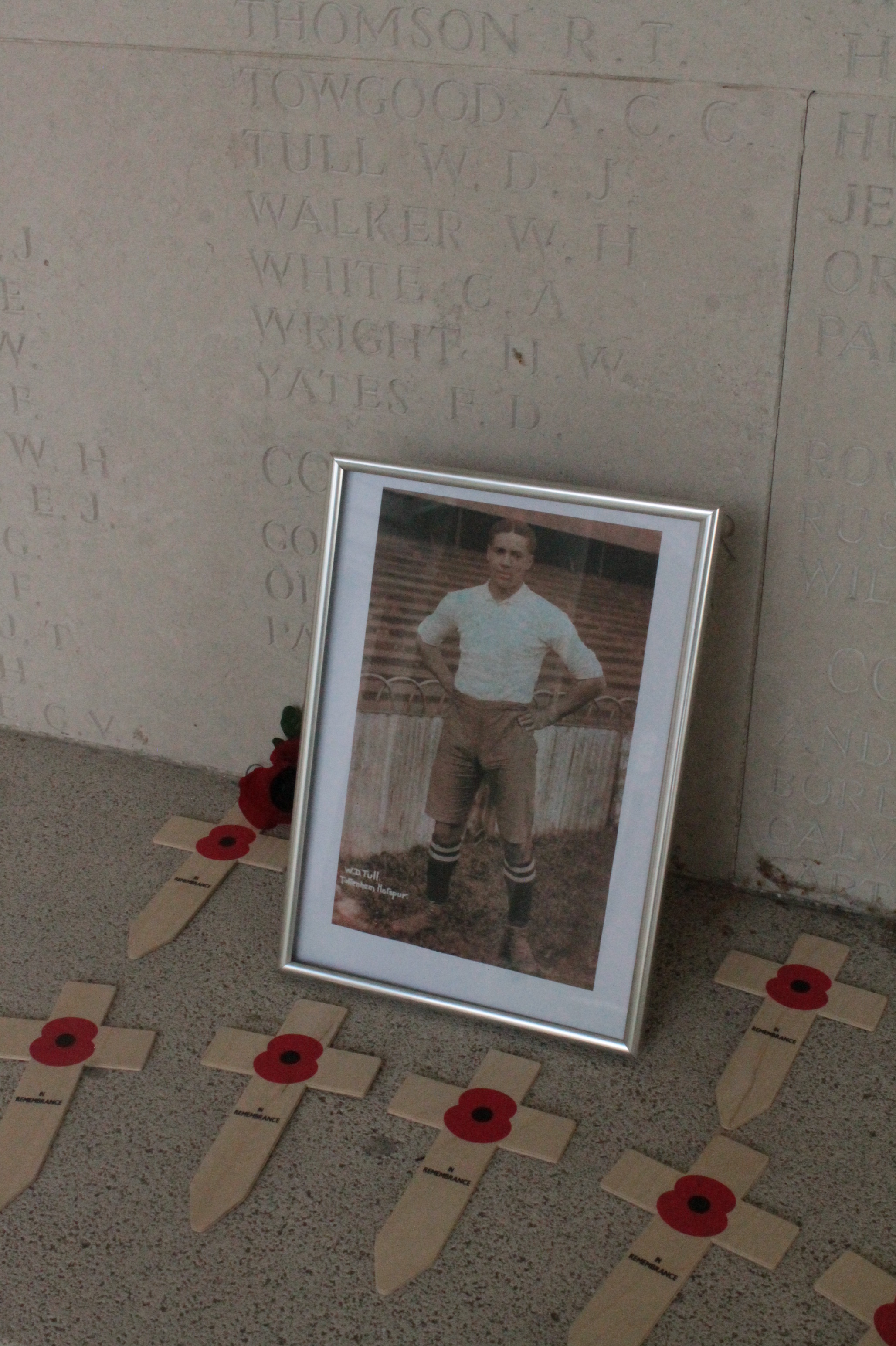
Walter Tull's name on the Arras Memorial and left memorabilia

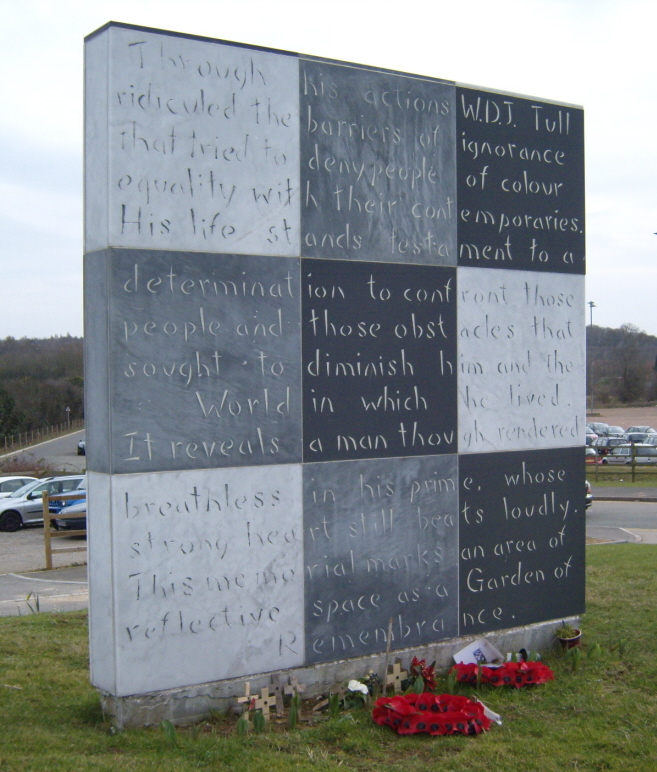
Walter Tull memorial at the Sixfields Stadium, Northampton

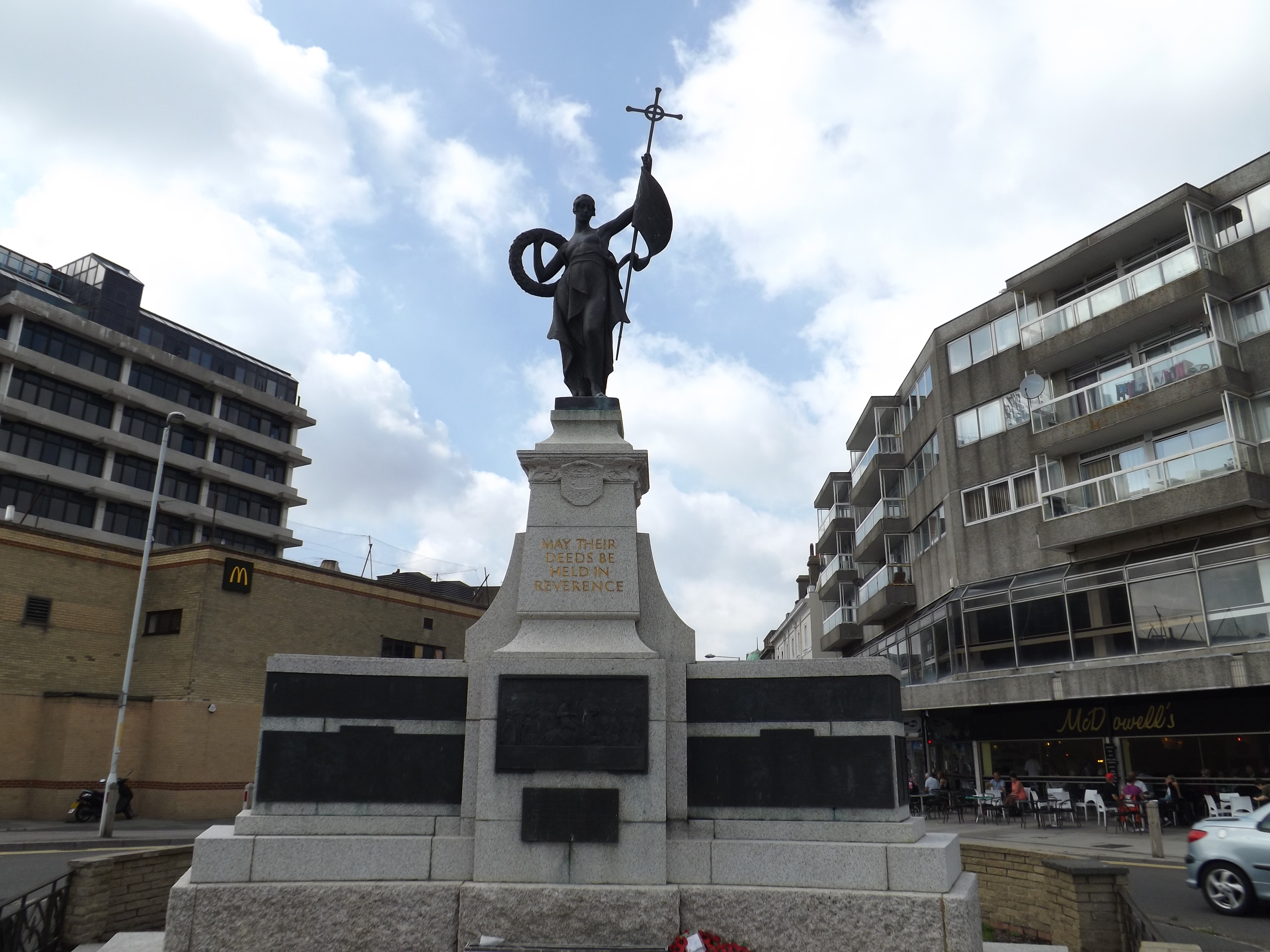
Folkestone War Memorial

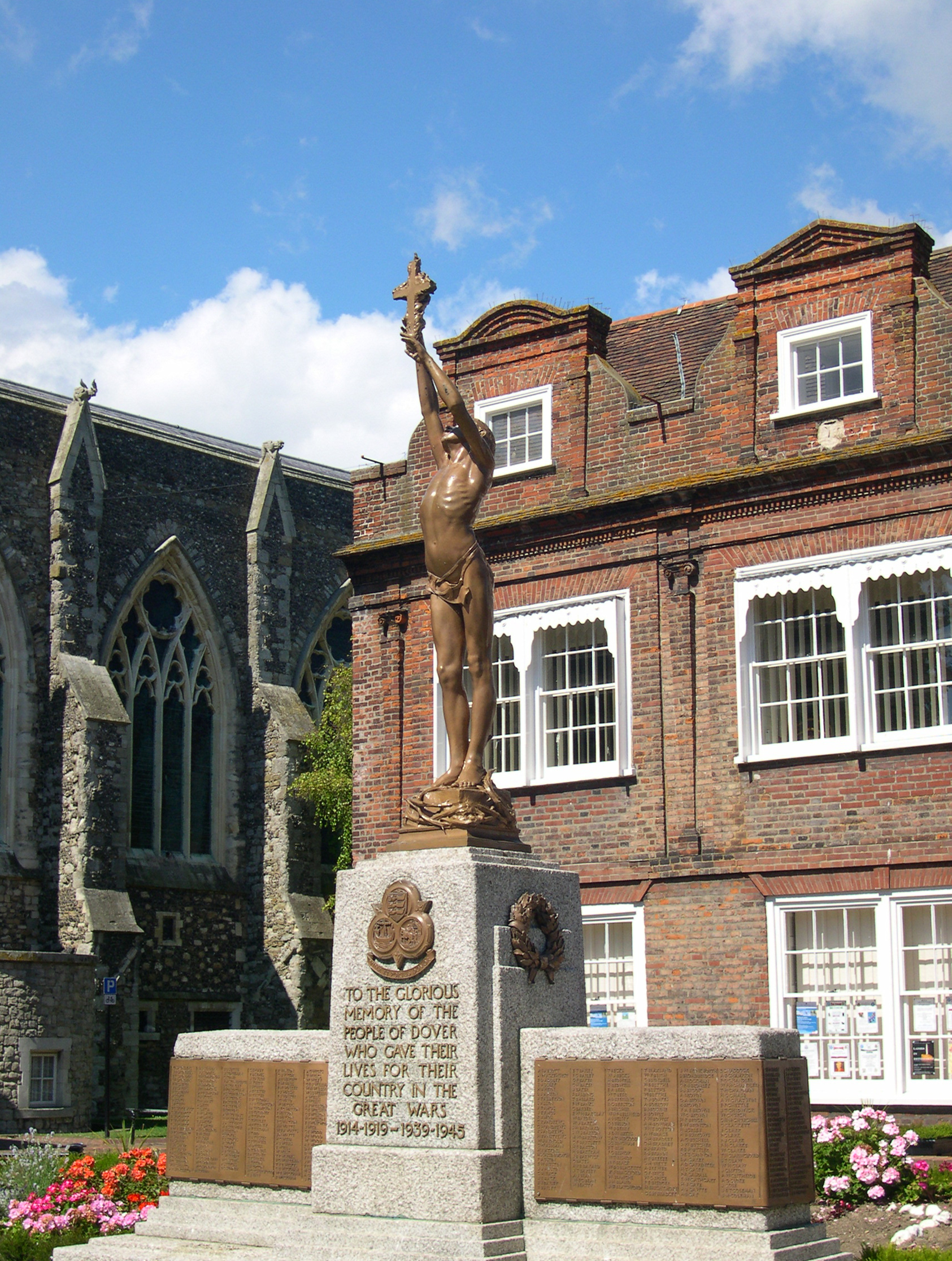
Dover war memorial

Tull is commemorated on Bay 7 of the Arras Memorial, which commemorates 34,785 soldiers with no known grave who died in the Arras sector.

His name was added to his parents' gravestone in Cheriton Road Cemetery, Folkestone. His older brother William, of the Royal Engineers, died in 1920, aged 37, and is buried in the cemetery with a Commonwealth War Graves Commission (CWGC) headstone, so his death was recognised as a result of his war service.

Tull's name is listed in the Roll of Honour for the City of Glasgow, his address given as 419 St. Vincent Street, the location of the dental surgery belonging to his brother Edward.

Tull's name appeared on the war memorial at North Board School, Folkestone, unveiled on 29 April 1921. He is named on the Folkestone War Memorial, at the top of the Road of Remembrance in Folkestone, and in Dover his name is on the town war memorial outside Maison Dieu House, and on the parish memorial at River.

On 11 July 1999, Northampton Town F.C. unveiled a memorial wall to Tull in a garden of remembrance at Sixfields Stadium. The text, written by Tull's biographer, Phil Vasili, reads:

Through his actions, W. D. J. Tull ridiculed the barriers of ignorance that tried to deny people of colour equality with their contemporaries. His life stands testament to a determination to confront those people and those obstacles that sought to diminish him and the world in which he lived. It reveals a man, though rendered breathless in his prime, whose strong heart still beats loudly.

A road behind the North Stand (The Dave Bowen Stand) at Sixfields Stadium is named Walter Tull Way, and a public house adjacent to the stadium bears his name.

In 2010, a planning application to erect a bronze memorial statue of Tull in Geraldine Mary Harmsworth Park close to the Imperial War Museum in London, was refused by Southwark London Borough Council.

The Royal Mint included a £5 coin honouring Tull in the introductory First World War six-coin set, released in 2014.

On 21 October 2014, a blue plaque was unveiled at 77 Northumberland Park, London N17, on the site of the house where Tull lived before the war, close to the White Hart Lane ground. The plaque was provided by the Nubian Jak Community Trust and was unveiled by former Spurs striker Garth Crooks, who described Tull as an "amazing man" whose recognition had been "a long time coming".

On 4 July 2017, five statues including one of Tull were unveiled in the courtyard of Northampton Guildhall. The bronze installations were commissioned by Northampton Borough Council from sculptor Richard Austin.

On 25 March 2018, to commemorate the centenary of Tull's death, Rushden & District History Society unveiled a blue plaque at 26 Queen Street, Rushden, where he lodged while playing at Northampton Town.

In September 2018, to mark the centenary of the end of the First World War, Royal Mail produced a set of stamps, one of which features Tull.

On Remembrance Sunday 2018, the people of Ayr, Scotland, came together to etch a large sand portrait of Tull into the town's beach as part of "Pages of the Sea", a nationwide public art project curated by Oscar-winning filmmaker Danny Boyle.

In October 2020, as part of Black History Month, the Royal Mail painted a postbox black in Glasgow to honour Tull.

On 21 October 2021, Tull was inducted into the English Football Hall of Fame of the National Football Museum.

In October 2022, Nick Marr launched a campaign on Change.org to honour Tull, advocating for Tull to be posthumously awarded the Military Cross and proposing the erection of a statue in Central London. The campaign highlights the historical and symbolic importance of formally acknowledging Tull's contributions, both as a soldier and as a trailblazer for racial equality. It also underscores the potential value of a statue in London to commemorate his legacy, serving as a reminder of his achievements and an inspiration to future generations.

In late 2024, a musical about Tull's life, written by Dougie Blaxland with music by Chris Anthony, toured the UK.

==== Walter Tull Trophy ====
In July 2004, to honour the memory of Tull Tottenham Hotspur and Rangers contested in a summer friendly tournament dubbed the Walter Tull Trophy. Rangers won the Cup, defeating Spurs 2–0 with goals from Dado Pršo and Nacho Novo. The two clubs arranged and contested again in July 2022. This time Tottenham Hotspur beat Rangers 2–1 at Ibrox.

== Media and television ==
In 2005 Michaela Morgan wrote Respect!, an account of Tull's life, specifically written for young people and was published by Barrington Stoke. The book was shortlisted in the Birmingham Libraries young readers' book festival May 2008.

Then in May 2008 two films were launched focusing on teaching about Tull which was made for Teachers TV. Also in 2008 the BBC created Walter's War, a drama about the life of Tull, starring O. T. Fagbenle and written by Kwame Kwei-Armah, that was first screened on 9 November 2008 as part of the BBC's Ninety Years of Remembrance season. The drama was aired alongside Forgotten Hero, a documentary about Tull.

In 2016, Off The Records made an animated film about Tull's life, Walter Tull: Britain's First Black Officer, which was voiced by actor Liam Gerrard. The film was nominated for a children's BAFTA.

== Bibliography ==
- Lyndon, Dan (2011). Walter Tull: Footballer, Soldier, Hero. Collins. ISBN 978-0007336371.
- Goodwin, Bob (1992). The Spurs Alphabet. ACL & Polar Publishing (UK) Ltd. ISBN 0-9514862-8-4.
- Vasili, Phil (2018). Walter Tull 1888 to 1918: Footballer and Officer (2nd ed.). London League Publications. ISBN 978-1909885172.
