= Allan Minns =

Allan Minns may refer to:

- Allan Glaisyer Minns (1858–1930), medical doctor and the first man of colour to become a mayor in Britain
- Allan Noel Minns (1891–1921), his son, English medical doctor and British Army officer
