= 1/1st Pembroke Yeomanry =

British military unit in Wales

1/1st Pembroke Yeomanry 24th (Pembroke & Glamorgan Yeomanry) Bn, Welsh Regiment
- Active: 10 August 1914 – 5 July 1919
- Country: United Kingdom
- Branch: Territorial Force
- Type: Yeomanry
- Role: Cavalry/Infantry
- Size: Regiment/Battalion
- Part of: South Wales Mounted Brigade; 74th (Yeomanry) Division
- Garrison/HQ: The Norton drill hall, Tenby
- Engagements: Second Battle of Gaza; Third Battle of Gaza; Capture of Beersheba; Capture of the Sheria feature Capture of Jerusalem; Defence of Jerusalem; Battle of Tell 'Asur; Hundred Days Offensive; Second Battle of Bapaume; Battle of Épehy; Final advance in Artois and Flanders

The 1/1st Pembroke Yeomanry was an active service unit formed by the Pembroke Yeomanry during World War I. It was sent to garrison Egypt and then amalgamated with another dismounted cavalry unit to form an infantry battalion, the 24th (Pembroke and Glamorgan Yeomanry) Battalion of the Welsh Regiment. Serving in the 74th (Yeomanry) Division (the 'Broken Spur Division') it participated in the Sinai and Palestine campaign, including the capture of Beersheba and Jerusalem. Moving with the division to the Western Front it fought in the final campaign, including the desperate Battle of Épehy, until the Armistice. It was disbanded after the war.

== Mobilisation ==
When war was declared on 4 August 1914, the Pembroke Yeomanry (Castlemartin) of the Territorial Force (TF) mobilised at The Norton drill hall, Tenby, with Lieutenant-Colonel Owen Williams VD, in command. It joined the South Wales Mounted Brigade (SWMB) at Carmarthen and then went with it by train to Hereford.

The part-time TF was intended to be a home defence force in wartime and its members could not be compelled to serve overseas. However, on 10 August 1914 the TF was invited to volunteer for overseas service. In the SWMB the Montgomeryshire and Glamorgan Yeomanry signed up en masse at Hereford, though the Pembroke Yeomanry were less enthusiastic: reportedly only 120 men signed up at first from a complement of 496, though others were later persuaded to change their minds. On 15 August the War Office issued instructions to separate those men who had signed up for Home Service only, and form these into reserve units. On 31 August, the formation of a reserve or 2nd Line unit was authorised for each 1st Line unit where 60 per cent or more of the men had volunteered for Overseas Service. The titles of these 2nd Line units would be the same as the original, but distinguished by a '2/' prefix. In this way duplicate battalions, brigades and divisions were created, mirroring the 1st Line TF formations being sent overseas. Later, the 2nd Line was prepared for overseas service and a 3rd Line was formed to act as a reserve, providing trained replacements for the 1st and 2nd Line regiments.

== 1/1st Pembroke Yeomanry ==
The 1/1st Pembroke Yeomanry moved with the 1/1st SWMB to East Anglia and was stationed in Norfolk, at Thetford by 29 August, moving to Aylsham shortly afterwards. The following month the brigade joined the 1st Mounted Division. While training in East Anglia the division at the same time formed part of the defence forces for the East Coast, and there were numerous false invasion alarms. In December 1914 Lt-Col Williams died in an accident and Major Cecil Spence-Jones was promoted to the command. By September 1915 the 1/1st Pembroke Yeomanry was based at Holt. In October it moved to Cromer. In November the 1/1st SWMB was dismounted.

=== Egypt ===
The 1/1st SWMB embarked at Devonport on 4 March 1916, with the 1/1st Pembroke Yeomanry aboard the SS Arcadian, and sailed to Egypt in company with the 1/1st Welsh Border Mounted Brigade from 1st Mtd Division. They disembarked at Alexandria on 14–15 March and on 20 March the two brigades were merged to form the 4th Dismounted Brigade. At first this was placed in the Suez Canal defences under 53rd (Welsh) Division, with 1/1st Pembroke Yeomanry at Beni Salama, but in April it came under the command of Western Frontier Force (WFF).

Following the Senussi campaign of 1915, the WFF was left guarding Egypt's western and southern frontier against any further incursions. 4th Dismounted Brigade covered the Bahariya front with patrols and outposts, though any Senussi activity was further north, so the brigade saw no fighting. A number of officers and men of the 1/1st Pembroke Yeomanry volunteered to transfer to the Imperial Camel Corps, the Machine Gun Corps and the Australian Imperial Force.

At the beginning of 1917 the Egyptian Expeditionary Force (EEF) was preparing to advance across Sinai into Palestine and required additional infantry. The dismounted brigades on the western frontier began to move east. In January 1917 the dismounted yeomanry of 4th Dismounted Bde were permanently re-roled as infantry. The brigade became 231st Brigade, which joined 74th (Yeomanry) Division on its formation in March 1917.

== 24th (Pembroke & Glamorgan Yeomanry) Battalion ==
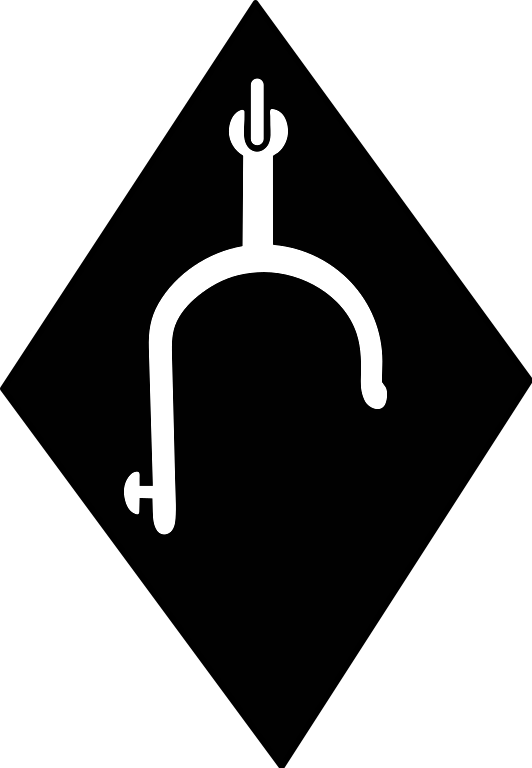
The 'broken spur' insignia of 74th (Yeomanry) Division'

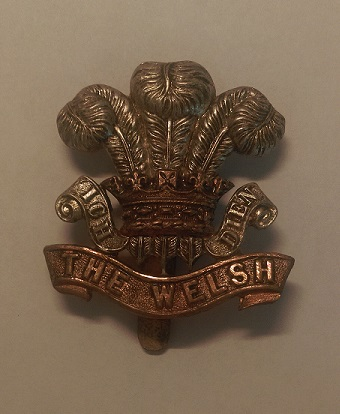
Welsh Regiment cap badge.

Cavalry regiments were smaller than infantry battalions, so the dismounted yeomanry regiments were paired to form effective battalions and these were affiliated to infantry regiments. On 2 February, 1/1st Pembroke Yeomanry amalgamated with 1/1st Glamorgan Yeomanry to form 24th (Pembroke & Glamorgan Yeomanry Battalion, Welsh Regiment (Note: The Welsh Regiment often used the spelling 'Welch', but this was not officially adopted until 1921.) under the command of Lt-Col Spence-Jones of the Pembroke Yeomanry.

=== Palestine ===
The 24th Welsh crossed the Suez Canal on 24 March as the division moved up into Palestine. After the failure of the First Battle of Gaza it began taking over the outpost line along the Wadi Ghuzzee on 7 April; 231st Bde took over at Khan Yunus on 11 April. 74th (Y) Division was in reserve for the Second Battle of Gaza beginning on 19 April, tasked with moving across the Wadi Ghuzzee following the divisions advancing on Gaza City. Soon after midnight 231st Bde moved down into the wadi, complicated by the fact that troops from the attacking 52nd (Lowland) Division were occupying the same ground and did not move off until 04.15. However, this attack was also unsuccessful and although the division took a few casualties from enemy shellfire and aircraft attacks it was not engaged. The division dug in on its new positions on 20 April. Active operations shut down for several months during which the new division continued its organisation and training while carrying out a number of patrol actions.

==== Beersheba ====
Sir Edmund Allenby took over command of the EEF in May and began thorough preparations before launching the next offensive (the Third Battle of Gaza) on 27 October. During August the 24th Welsh carried out intensive training in the desert in platoon tactics and musketry. On 25 October 231st Bde Group was at Nakhrur; that night it marched to Abu Sita, leaving the camp standing and campfires burning. The following night it continued to Gamli, where 230th Bde took over the front line and the rest of the division formed up behind. While Turkish attention was fixed on Gaza City by a heavy bombardment from land and sea, XX Corps, including 74th (Y) Division led by 229th Bde, made a night approach march on 30/31 October to attack Beersheba on the Turks' landward flank. The other two brigades of the division then moved up. After crawling from wadi to wadi under accurate shrapnel and machine gun fire, 231st Bde was within 500 yards (460 m) of the Turkish main defences by 10.40; the artillery cut the barbed wire and the brigades attacked at 12.15 through the dust clouds of the bombardment. The leading battalions of 231st Bde met stout resistance but broke into the position. As follow-up battalion, 24th Welsh then passed through and advanced 2,000 yards (1,800 m) into the Turkish positions and took up a defensive line. Meanwhile the Desert Mounted Corps swept round the flank and into Beersheba itself. On 1 November the battalion was withdrawn and began battlefield clearance.

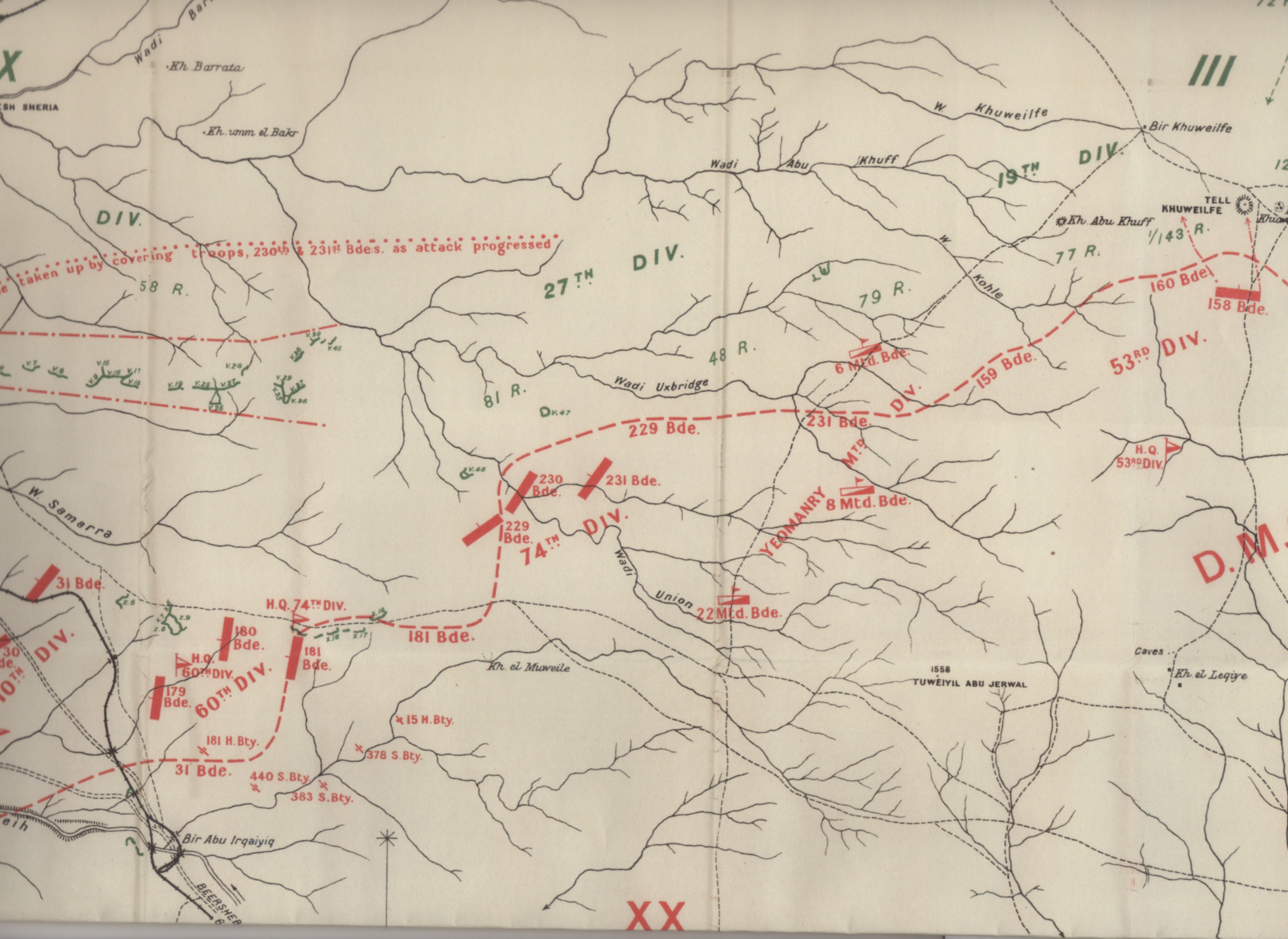
XX Corps' attack on 6 November.

==== Sheria ====
The Capture of Beersheba was a resounding success, and XX Corps pressed on northwards as the Turks fell back to the Sheria Position. 229th Brigade led 74th (Y) Division's pre-dawn attack on this position on 6 November, without preliminary bombardment or barrage. 231st Brigade was echeloned back to the right to protect the flank and then take the high ground. Having driven the Turkish skirmishers off the high ground, 24th Welsh beat off several counter-attacks in the course of the day. Afterwards 231st Bde was given the task of capturing the station at Tel Sheria, but this could not be completed until the fire and explosions in the abandoned Turkish ammunition dump died down at 03.30 next morning. 24th Welsh remained guarding the brigade's flank. The Capture of the Sheria feature broke the Turkish left, and they began a rapid retreat.

==== Jerusalem ====
While the mounted troops pursued the beaten enemy, 74th (Y) Division paused and re-equipped with winter clothing for the next phase of the campaign. By 25 November the division was about four days' march behind the fighting line, but it was brought up for the advance into the Judaean Hills towards Jerusalem. The Turks launched strong counter-attacks on 27 and 28 November, and 74th (Y) Division began arriving to reinforce the position on 29 November, 231st Bde having marched 12 out of the previous 18 hours. Coming under 52nd (L) Division the brigade took over scattered positions from the remnants of 8th Mounted Brigade. 25th (Montgomery and Welsh Horse Yeomanry) Battalion, Royal Welch Fusiliers, of 231st Bde was ordered to advance through Et Tire and occupy a line from 'Point 1750' (which did not exist) to the village of Foqa (which 52nd (L) Divisional HQ did not realise had been abandoned the previous night). A company of 24th Welsh was sent up in support. After a gallant defence, 25th RWF was driven back out of Foqa and Et Tire. 24th Welsh was ordered to fill the gap between the presumed Point 1750 and the 10th (Shropshire & Cheshire Yeomanry) Bn King's Shropshire Light Infantry (KSLI), and then to recapture Et Tire in the morning. After a long night march on 30 November the battalion attacked and temporarily recaptured Et Tire next day, but was under enfilade fire and the position was untenable. 24th Welsh fell back to the high ground and began building a defensive line of stone sangars. 231st and 229th Bdes had difficulty forming a solid defensive front in the confused country. However, on 8 December the EEF launched its final attack on Jerusalem. 74th (Y) Division's surprise attack on a narrow front was supported by flanking fire from 231st Bde in the Nebi Samwil defences (confused by the fact that there were also Turkish machine guns concealed in the ruined village). Next day Jerusalem surrendered and the division was then engaged in road-making for most of the month while the EEF defended Jerusalem against Turkish counter-attacks. 74th (Y) Division resumed its advance on 27 December, 24th Welsh launching an attack on Hill 1910. They were driven off it before they could consolidate the position, but renewed the attack and held the hill after fierce hand-to-hand fighting. By 31 December the EEF had established a strong defence line covering Jerusalem. The division then went into reserve and resumed roadbuilding. The 24th Welsh remained guarding Jerusalem and Bethlehem while the rest of 231st Bde played a minor role in the capture of Jericho on 19–20 February 1918.

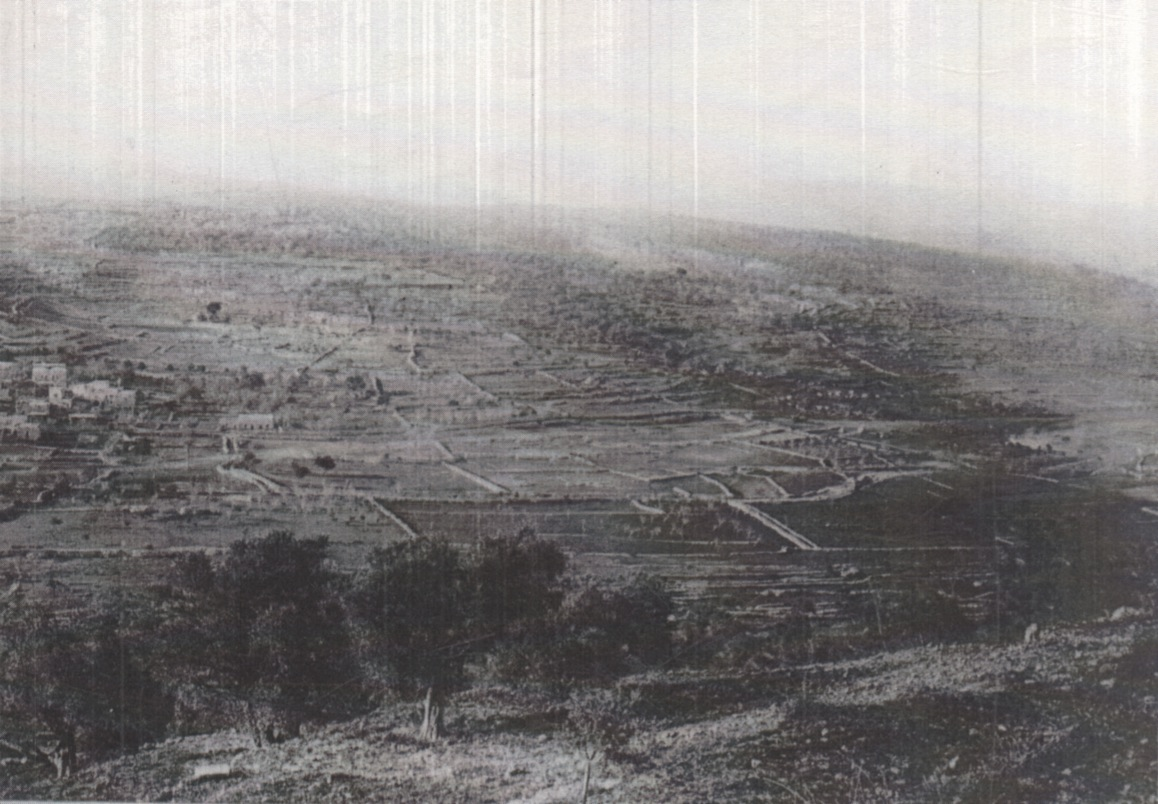
74th (Yeomanry) Division's view north up the Jerulsalem–Nablus road, early 1918.

=== Tell 'Asur ===
By March the EEF was ready to advance into the Jordan Valley and 74th (Y) Division was brought up. 231st Brigade returned to the line first, under 53rd (W) Division, with 24th Welsh and 24th (Denbighshire Hussars) Bn RWF taking over the line on 27 February. The Turkish lines were lightly held, so on 1/2 March the RWF advanced the line to the high ground without opposition, and the next night B and D Companies of 24th Welsh pushed forward to Ain Yebrud and captured a machine gun position. The two battalions made another small advance on 6/7 March, 24th Welsh taking 'Raspberry Hill' but the only casualties came from climbing the steep hills. The Turks counterattacked Raspberry Hill but were driven off.

74th (Y) Divisional HQ now took over the front for the planned attack. On the night of 8/9 March XX Corps moved against the high ground of Tell 'Asur dominating the valley. 74th (Y) Division advanced astride the Nablus road, with 231st Bde on the right directed at Mezrah esh Sherqiye, just east of the road and 1.5 miles (2.4 km) NNW of Tell 'Asur. After an approach in the dark the brigade rushed the Turkish positions at Selwad at 04.00 without any preliminary artillery fire, 10th KSLI leading, supported by 25th RWF. The brigade swept through the positions; when 25th RWF came under flanking fire from two hills, two companies of 24th Welsh dealt with them. The brigade was now faced with a steep machine-gun swept descent to the Wadi en Nimr, and was so far ahead that it was out of touch with its flanking brigades. It resumed the advance after dark, 24th Welsh and 10th KSLI forming up in the bottom of the wadi at 20.30 before beginning the long climb up the wall of the Lisane Ridge. Despite congestion at the one climbable route they carried the position at 03.00 on 10 March. B and D Companies of 24th Welsh then supported 25th RWF on to the objective. By now 230th Bde on the left was exhausted, so 74th (Y) Division was ordered to halt on the line it had taken. The Battle of Tell 'Asur was 74th (Y) Division's last action in the campaign.

=== Western Front ===
The German spring offensive on the Western Front left the British Expeditionary Force (BEF) in urgent need of reinforcements, and troops were sent from the EEF. 74th (Y) Division was warned on 3 April of an impending move to France; between 7 and 9 April it was relieved in the front line and by 13 April it had moved back to Lydda to concentrate. It then moved back to Egypt, arriving at Qantara on 20 April. On 29 April it began embarking at Alexandria, 24th Welsh aboard HM Transport Canberra, and sailed for Marseille. The ship arrived on 7 May and the division entrained for Noyelles, 24th Welsh arriving on 12 May. By 18 May the division had concentrated around Rue in the Abbeville district.

74th (Y) Division now embarked on training for the fighting conditions on the Western Front, principally anti-gas defence, but also including bayonet fighting (though the divisional historian pointed out that 'any one platoon of the 74th Division had probably made more use of the bayonet that any battalion in France'.) The battalion also supplied working parties for road-building and onctrsuting rear area defences. Towards the end of the month the division was moved forward between Doullens and St Pol and on 31 May it became part of the GHQ Reserve. It continued training around Le Cauroy, particularly for cooperation with tanks and aircraft, until 14 July. It then went into the line near Merville under XI Corps in Fifth Army. Here the marshy ground precluded trenches, and the defences consisted of breastworks.

The Allies launched their counter-offensive (the Hundred Days Offensive) with the Battle of Amiens on 8 August and the Germans began to withdraw at several points along the line. 74th (Y) Division advanced its line on 16–18 August, the 24th Welsh taking over a section of enemy trench known as 'Wolf's Track'. The battalion advanced again on 20 August, suffering a few casualties in the skirmishing and from gas shelling. The division was relieved on 26 August.

==== Bapaume ====
On 30 August the division joined III Corps in Fourth Army, preparing for the next phase of the offensive, the Second Battle of Bapaume, opening on 2 September. The aim was to keep the Germans on the move, and 74th (Y) Division had little time for preparation. On the night of 1/2 September, a few hours after detraining it relieved 58th (2/1st London) Division in a tangled confusion of trenches, some of which were held in parts by both sides, from which it would have to jump off the following morning. 229th and 230th Bdes led, with 231st Bde in reserve. A neighbouring division had to capture its jumping-off trench before it could start, and enemy machine gun posts in No man's land had to be cleared before the advance began. The attack was therefore late starting, and the division lost its protective Creeping barrage. The defensive artillery fire was also much heavier than had been experienced against the Turks. The division's leading brigades were still in the line when the fighting ended on the Tortille valley at dusk, and although it took a few casualties 231st Bde did not get into the real fighting. Next morning it took over a portion of the line from the neighbouring 2nd Australian Division to form a defensive flank for 74th (Y) Division.

==== Pursuit to the Hindenburg Line ====
Nevertheless, the battle had been a success, and on 4 September Fourth Army began pursuing the Germans back towards their Hindenburg Line. On 7 September 231st Bde took up the lead, with 24th Welsh and 10th KSLI taking Villers-Faucon after some heavy fightin, in which 24th Welsh lost 12 killed and 75 wounded. Next day 231st Bde attempted to take the trenches at Hargicourt, but the neighbouring 58th (2/1st L) Division was held up in front of Épehy. Patrols found the enemy in strength everywhere and they were not shaken by the British artillery fire. The brigade fell back to its starting point by the end of the day. 229th Brigade (temporarily commanded by Lt-Col Spence-Jones of 24th Welsh) and 58th (2/1st L) Division made a failed attempt on the Horse Shoe Trench system at Épehy on 10 September, and it was clear that a fully prepared attack would have to be made.

==== Épehy ====
The Battle of Épehy was scheduled for 18 September, but preparations were hampered by German Mustard gas shelling the day before, which cased numerous casualties among 74th (Y) Division. The assault, timed for 05.20, was made behind a creeping barrage containing 10 per cent smoke shells, timed to lift 100 yards (91 m) every 3 minutes. The barrage was to pause for over an hour just beyond the first objective (the Green Line) to allow that to be consolidated. The advance was made through rain which made the ground slippery, but 231st Bde was on its first objective, the south side of Ronssoy, by 07.35, taking many prisoners without much resistance. While 24th Welsh remained to consolidate Ronssoy, 25th RWF passed through to follow the creeping barrage as it restarted at 08.30 towards the second objective (the Red Line). However, resistance now stiffened and the brigade was stopped by massed machine gun fire from the 'Quadrilateral' on the left flank, which 18th (Eastern) Division had not yet reached. 231st Brigade had been brought to a standstill, and a fresh bombardment of the second objective was arranged for 16.00, allowing 10th KSLI to complete its task. But 25th RWF was shattered and 18th (Eastern) Division had made less progress through Ronssoy, so 24th Welsh dug in on its positions, having suffered heavy casualties (13 killed and 65 wounded).

The attack was renewed on 21 September. With its flank thrown back from the Red Line, 25th RWF had a tricky task in attacking the Quadrilateral, then swinging right (east) to allow 24th Welsh to pass through to take Gillemont Farm, with 25th RWF finally retaking the lead to continue east to capture and consolidate the Blue Line. It appears that 25th RWF successfully passed over the Quadrilateral and swung eastwards through an intense barrage, but 24th Welsh lost direction and simply followed 25th RWF rather carrying on to Gillemont Farm. Meanwhile 18th (E) Division was still held up and the dugouts and tunnels of the Quadrilateral were being reinforced from that side. The defenders of the Quadrilateral continued to fire into the rear of the 25th RWF despite the efforts of 24th Welsh to bomb them out. 231st Brigade suffered very heavy casualties (24th RWF lost 14 killed, 96 wounded – nine mortally – and 24 missing of whom at least 10 were killed) (Note: Among those killed near Gillemont Farm on 21 September 1918 was Lt David Clemetson, one of the first black officers commissioned into the British Army. Born in Jamaica, he was at Cambridge University when World War I broke out and he enlisted in the 23rd (Service) Battalion (1st Sportsman's), Royal Fusiliers. He was commissioned into the Pembroke Yeomanry on 27 October 1915, and served with 1/1st Pembrokes and 24th Welsh in Palestine and on the Western Front.) and by the end of the day it was back on its starting positions.

==== Final advance ====
74th (Y) Division was now considered tired and was sent back to XI Corps with Fifth Army, beginning to entrain on 25 and arriving on 30 September. Far from getting a rest, it went straight into action as it relieved 19th (Western) Division in the line at Neuve-Chapelle on the night of 1/2 October. The divisional commander had no intention of using his exhausted men offensively, but the Germans began to withdraw on 2 October and 74th (Y) Division followed up for 2 miles (3.2 km). After barely a day in the reserve trenches, 231st Bde moved forward to Aubers Ridge, and on 3 October it continued the advance, meeting no opposition, though 24th Welsh suffered casualties from shellfire. On 4 October the advance was slowed by enemy artillery fire, and by nightfall patrols had found the enemy holding positions in strength.

While the pursuit paused, 74th (Y) Division returned to the command of III Corps on 8 October when that HQ arrived from the south. On 15 October patrols revealed that the Germans were withdrawing again, and the division followed up to the Haute Deule Canal. The enemy kept up fire from the canal until 04.30 on 17 October and then suddenly disappeared. 74th (Y) Division crossed the canal and followed up south of Lille. Next day, slowly advancing through fog, 231st Bde found the enemy rearguard of machine guns and field guns at Sainghin; the village was taken without difficulty and the brigade outposts advanced to the River la Marcq, where all the bridges had been destroyed. Next morning (19 October) the river was crossed without any opposition and the advance continued, with 231st Bde reaching Camphin, but the following morning the brigade was squeezed out of the line because of the division's shortening front. The Germans now held a strong belt of barbed wire at Orcq in front of Tournai on the River Schelde, and unable to make progress the division halted. 24th Welsh rested, carried out battalion drill, and supplied working parties. Lieutenant-Col Spence-Jones was promoted to colonel on 21 October and officially retired from the Pembroke Yeomanry.

On 30 October the brigade returned to the line, and on 2 November 24 Welsh and 10th KSLI advanced under a creeping barrage as a reconnaissance, but finding the enemy line still firmly held, they withdrew. On 4 November, the Germans suffered another crushing defeat at the Battle of the Sambre, and their retreat was resumed all along the line. Early on the morning of 8 November patrols of 25th RWF entered the western half of Tournai where civilians confirmed that the Germans had left at 03.00. 24th Welsh was then sent to patrol into the town, confirming that all the bridges over the Schelde had been blown and the enemy had machine guns lining the eastern bank. They left the following night and next morning the engineers had a footbridge across the Schelde by 07.00 and 10th KSLI crossed to the east side of the town. There was no contact with the enemy as the division advanced on 10 November. By 08.30 on 11 November 231st Bde had crossed the Dendre Canal and liberated Ath when the advance was ended by the entry into force of Armistice with Germany at 11.00.

==== Disbandment ====
On 16 November the division moved into the area of Rebaix–Herinnes–Tournai and next day 24th Welsh went into billets at Beclers and was employed on repairing roads and the embankment of the Tournai–Leuze railway. Demobilisation of coalminers began in early December. Between 15 and 18 December the division moved to the Lessines–Grammont–Herrines area, with 24th Welsh billeted in Overboulaere, a suburb of Grammont. On 22 December Col Spence-Jones assumed command of 231st Bde and Maj John Woodcock took command of the battalion. Almost half the battalion was demobilised in January 1919, and a large draft of men with shorter service being sent to the Army of Occupation, the battalion was down to a strength of one company in February. On 24 June Maj Woodcock led the remaining cadre of the battalion back to Carmarthen, where 4th (Pembroke & Glamorgan Yeomanry) Battalion, Welsh Regiment was disbanded on 5 July 1919.

=== Guidon ===
Although it was normal for regiments to 'lay up' their Regimental standards at a suitable location (town hall or church) before proceeding overseas, the 24th (Pembroke & Glamorgan Yeomanry) Battalion took the Pembrokeshire Yeomanry's guidon to France and carried it on all possible occasions during the war, such as guard-mounting. The guidon, of light blue silk, carried the Prince of Wales's feathers, coronet and 'Ich Dien' motto, with scrolls either side inscribed with the regiment's original title of 'Castlemartin Yeomanry' and underneath the unique Battle honour 'Fishguard', the first such honour conferred on a yeomanry regiment and the only one awarded for an engagement on British soil.
