= Bemand =

Bemand is a surname. Notable people with the surname include:

- George Bemand (1892–1916), British military officer
- Scott Bemand (born 1978), English rugby union footballer
