= David Clemetson =

British army officer (1893–1918)

David Louis Clemetson (1 October 1893 – 21 September 1918), born in Jamaica into a wealthy family, was one of the first black people to serve as an officer in the British Army. He was commissioned in the Pembroke Yeomanry in October 1915. He was killed in action in France in September 1918.

Almost a century before Clemetson, Nathaniel Wells served in the Yeomanry Cavalry of Gloucestershire and Monmouth in 1820 to 1822, and John Perkins served in the Royal Navy from 1775 to 1804. Other early black officers were Walter Tull, of the Middlesex Regiment, and George Bemand, of the Royal Field Artillery.

== Early life ==
Clemetson was born in Port Maria, in Saint Mary Parish, Jamaica. He was the eldest son of David Robert Clemetson and his wife Mary Eliza, of the Frontier Estate sugar plantation. His grandfather, Robert Clemetson, had been a slave, but he was also the son of his owner; he was freed by his father and became one of the wealthy elite on the island. Robert Clemetson himself owned slaves and, in 1840, was elected to the House of Assembly of Jamaica.

Clemetson was educated at Potsdam School in Jamaica, and then Clifton College in Bristol, England, where he served in the Officers' Training Corps. He studied Law at Trinity College, Cambridge from 1912, where he rowed for the First Trinity Boat Club's fourth boat (crewed by the rugby team).

== First World War ==
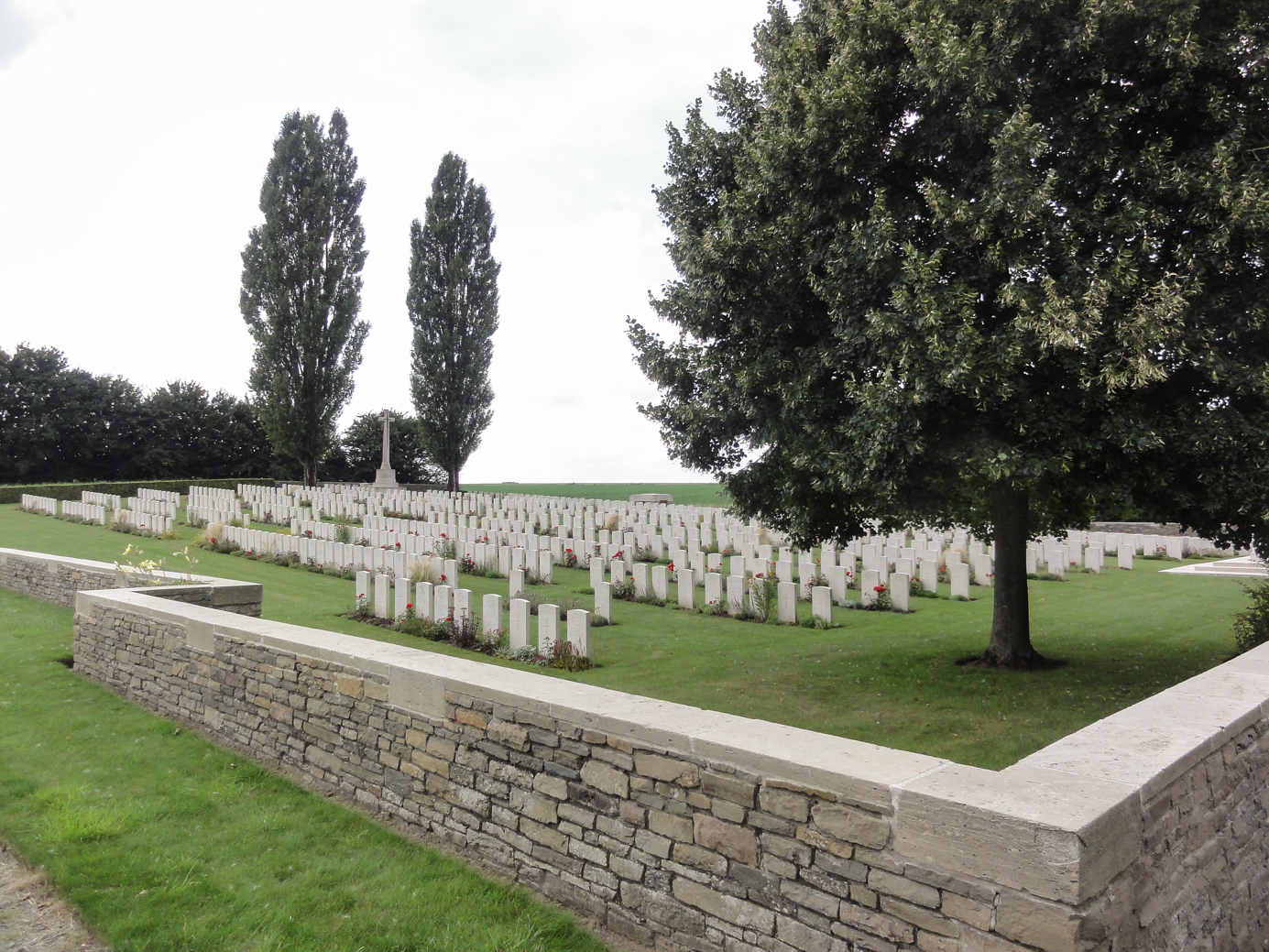
Unicorn Cemetery, Vendhuile

Following the outbreak of war, Clemetson left college without graduating, and enlisted in the 1st Sportsman's Battalion (the 23rd Battalion, Royal Fusiliers) in 1914. He became an acting lance sergeant, and played in the battalion's rugby team. On the recommendation of his commander Lieutenant Colonel H. J. H. Inglis, he was commissioned as a second lieutenant in the Pembroke Yeomanry on 27 October 1915.

His unit, 1/1st Pembroke Yeomanry, was sent to Egypt in March 1916 with the 4th Dismounted Brigade (later the 231st Brigade). He may have served at the Second Battle of Gaza (some reports suggest he served on the Macedonian front in Salonika, but his unit was not sent there). He returned to England after suffering shell shock and was rescued after the ship taking him back to England, HMHS Dover Castle, was sunk by a German submarine off North Africa on 26 May 1917. While he recuperated at Craiglockhart, he was promoted to the rank of lieutenant in July 1917.

He returned to his unit, which in March 1917, with the Glamorgan Yeomanry, formed the 24th (Pembroke and Glamorgan Yeomanry) Battalion, Welsh Regiment. He served on the Western Front from March 1918.

Clemetson was killed near Péronne, on the Somme, in September 1918, less than two months before the Armistice of 11 November 1918. He is now buried at Unicorn Cemetery in Vendhuile, Aisne. He is listed on the British West Indies Regiment memorial in Port Maria, Jamaica. A poem, "In Memoriam", written by a friend, was published in the Jamaica Gleaner after his death.
