= 157 (Welsh) Regiment RLC =

- Active: 1967-Present
- Country: United Kingdom
- Branch: British Army
- Role: Logistics
- Size: Regiment; 435 personnel
- Part of: Royal Logistic Corps
- Website: 157 Regiment RLC

157 (Welsh) Regiment RLC is an Army Reserve regiment of the Royal Logistic Corps.

== History ==
The regiment was formed in the Royal Corps of Transport as 157th (Wales and Midlands) Transport Regiment, RCT (Volunteers) in 1967. 224 Squadron was formed in 1969. The regiment was renamed 157th (Wales and Midlands) Transport Regiment, RCT (Volunteers) in 1987 and 157th (Wales and Midlands) Transport Regiment, RLC (Volunteers) in 1993. 580 Squadron was formed and HQ Squadron was re-designated 249 Squadron later that year. The regiment was-renamed 157th (Wales and Midlands) Logistic Support Regiment, RLC (Volunteers) in 1999 and 157th (Wales and Midlands) Transport Regiment, RLC (Volunteers) in 2006.

== Structure ==
The regiment's structure is:

- Regimental Headquarters, at Maindy Barracks, Cardiff
- 249 Headquarters Squadron, at Maindy Barracks, Cardiff
- 223 Transport Squadron, in Swansea
- 224 Transport Squadron, in Carmarthen
  - A Troop, in Haverfordwest
- 398 Transport Squadron, in Queensferry
- 580 Transport Squadron, at Maindy Barracks, Cardiff

== Battle honours ==
FISHGUARD. This was awarded to the Pembroke Yeomanry (Castlemartin) in 1853 to reflect the Regiment's involvement in the last invasion of Britain by the French in 1797. This honour is carried forward to the Welsh Transport Regiment by 224 (Pembroke Yeomanry) Squadron.
