= George Bemand =

George Edward Kingsley Bemand (19 March 1892 – 26 December 1916) was a British Army officer who served in the First World War. He was one of a small number of Black officers to serve in the British Army during the conflict. (Note: Others included Walter Tull, Allan Noel Minns and David Clemetson. Almost a century earlier Nathaniel Wells had received a Yeomanry commission in 1818.) He was killed in action in France.

Bemand was born in Jamaica in 1892 to George Bemand senior and his wife Minnie. He was the child of a white English father and a black Jamaican mother. The family moved to London in 1908 on RMS Lusitania, with the passenger list in New York recording Minnie and her son as "African-Black". George attended Dulwich College and then in 1913 went to University College, London to study engineering. At the start of the Great War he joined the University of London Officers' Training Corps and on 24 May 1915 was commissioned as a second lieutenant in the Royal Field Artillery; in his attestation form he categorised himself as being of pure European descent.

He was sent to France in August 1916 (his school records November 1915). While serving with a trench mortar battery, he was killed by a shell on Boxing Day 1916 near Béthune, and is buried at Le Touret Military Cemetery.

His younger brother Harold served in the ranks as a gunner and died of wounds in 1917, aged 19.
