= Pembroke Yeomanry =

British military regiment in Wales

- Tactical Recognition Flash (TRF) of the Royal Logistic Corps
- Active: 22 April 1794 – present
- Country: Kingdom of Great Britain (1794–1800); United Kingdom (1801 – present)
- Branch: Territorial Force/Army Reserve; Yeomanry (World War I); Royal Artillery (World War II); Royal Logistic Corps (current)
- Size: One Squadron
- Engagements: French Revolutionary Wars: Fishguard; Second Boer War; World War I: Sinai and Palestine campaign; Hundred Days Offensive; World War II: Western Desert campaign; Tunisian campaign; Italian campaign; North West Europe campaign

The Pembroke Yeomanry was an auxiliary regiment of the British Army dating back to 1794. It saw active service in the French Revolutionary War, the Second Boer War, World War I and World War II. Its lineage is maintained by 224 (Pembroke Yeomanry) Transport Squadron, part of 157 (Welsh) Regiment RLC in the Army Reserve.

== French Revolutionary and Napoleonic Wars ==
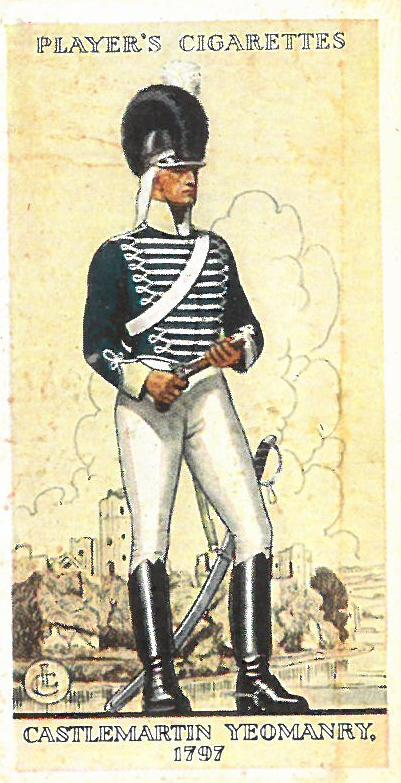

After Britain was drawn into the French Revolutionary Wars, Prime Minister William Pitt the Younger proposed on 14 March 1794 that the counties should form a force of Volunteer Yeoman Cavalry (Yeomanry) that could be called on by the King to defend the nation against invasion or by the Lord Lieutenant to subdue any civil disorder within the county. By the end of the year 27 counties had raised Yeomanry. Lord Milford, Lord Lieutenant of Haverfordwest and Pembrokeshire, was one of the first to act and the Castlemartin Troop was raised at Castlemartin, Pembrokeshire, on 22 April 1794 by John Campbell (later Lord Cawdor). Except in the case of actual invasion it was only to operate within Pembrokeshire and the neighbouring counties of Carmarthenshire and Cardiganshire. The Pembroke Yeoman Cavalry (Note: Not to be confused with the Pembrokeshire Regiment of Fencible Light Dragoons, a fulltime home defence regiment raised in 1795–6 for service anywhere in Britain, a detachment of which was at the Massacre of Tranent in Scotland in 1797.) of four troops followed on 17 July under the personal command of Lord Milford.

=== Fishguard ===
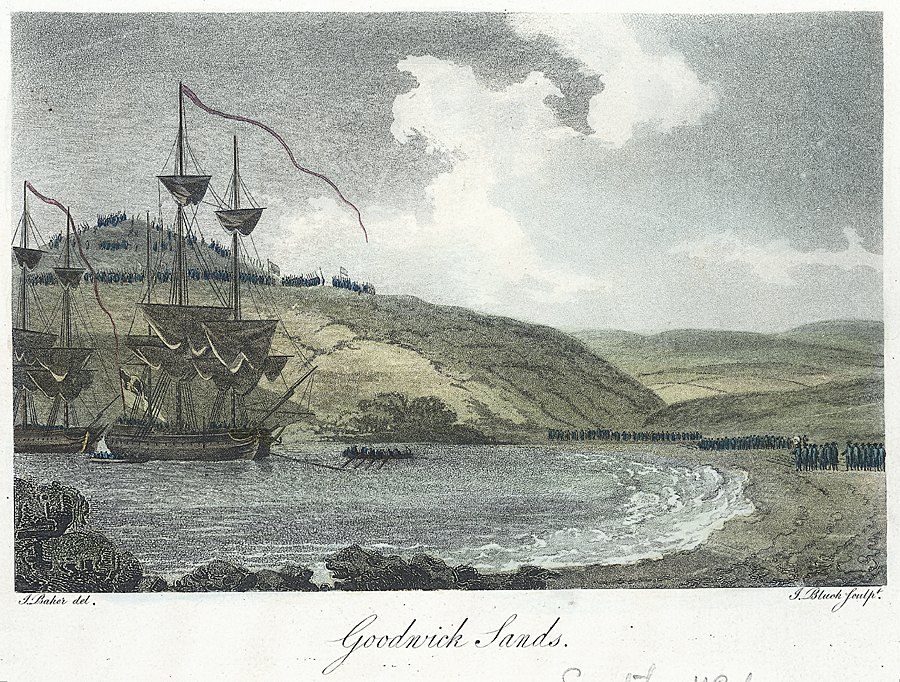
The Légion Noire landing on Goodwick Sands, 22 February 1797.

In February 1797 a French Republican fleet and landing force was spotted off the West of England and the coast defences were alerted. Unable to enter the Bristol Channel because of adverse winds, the French made for Cardigan Bay, appearing off Fishguard in Pembrokeshire on the afternoon of 22 February. A warning shot from the fort showed that the harbour was defended, so the French landed in the evening at Carregwastad Point, 2.5 miles (4.0 km) to the west. The landing force under Chef de brigade William Tate consisted of the Légion Noire, around 1300 strong, around half of them recruited from French convicts and foreign prisoners-of-war. Expecting a republican uprising in their favour, the force also landed additional arms and ammunition. At dawn on 23 February the French ships left, while the Legion posted an advance guard and patrols in the Carn Wnda hills and completed the unloading of stores on Goodwick Sands. Meanwhile, Lord Milford was gathering troops at Haverfordwest, including the Castlemartin Troop (3 officers and 43 cavalry), a company of the Cardiganshire Militia relieved from guarding prisoners-of-war at Pembroke (3 officers and 100 infantry), a company of the Pembroke Volunteer Infantry from Milford Haven (3 officers and 93 infantry), and 7 officers and 150 seamen with two 9-pounder guns from the Revenue Cutters-based there. Lord Cawdor led this force towards Fishguard, meeting the Fishguard and Newport Volunteer Infantry (3 officers and 191 infantry) who were retiring from the town. Cawdor then force-marched the whole group towards Fishguard, which was still unoccupied by the enemy when he arrived at 17.00 and set up his headquarters at the Royal Oak Inn. The Legion's outposts reported an enemy force approaching, its numbers inflated by the numerous onlookers on the surrounding hills, some armed with pitchforks, and including some hundreds of Welsh women in their traditional red shawls and tall black hats, whose appearance at a distance resembled redcoated infantry. (Note: Legends have grown up about the Welsh women at Fishguard, but the moral effect of their appearance is attested by a letter written only three days after the 'battle'.) Faced with the total breakdown of discipline amongst his Legion, who were looting every farm in the vicinity, and believing that he was facing a superior force, Tate sent a message to Cawdor that night offering to surrender on terms. Bluffing, Cawdor demanded unconditional surrender by 10.00 next morning, which Tate and his officers accepted. The Legion surrendered on Goodwick Sands, ending the Battle of Fishguard, 'the last invasion of Britain'.

Two of the French frigates involved in the expedition were captured on the way home and one was re-commissioned in the Royal Navy as HMS Fisgard. The Pembroke Yeomanry (Castlemartin) became the first auxiliary unit of the British Army to receive a Battle honour when Queen Victoria conferred the honour Fishguard upon the regiment on 28 May 1853, and it is the only unit still serving in the British Army to bear the name of an engagement on British soil.

As the war continued, further yeomanry units were later raised in Pembrokeshire: a fifth troop for the Pembroke Yeoman Cavalry in 1798, an independent Narberth Troop at Narberth, Pembrokeshire, in May 1798, and the Haverfordwest Yeomanry Cavalry of two troops on 17 April 1801. The Treaty of Amiens signed on 25 March 1802 appeared to have ended the war, and the yeomanry and volunteers were stood down.

When the Peace of Amiens broke down and the war was resumed in 1803, three yeomanry units were reformed in Pembrokeshire:

- Castlemartin Cavalry (3 Trps), Capt Adams commissioned 28 July 1803
- Haverfordwest Cavalry (1 Trp), Capt John Allen commissioned 10 December 1803 (other officers 17 April 1801)
- Pembroke Cavalry, under Lt-Col Commandant Sir Hugh Owen, 6th Baronet of Orielton, commissioned 9 November 1803, formed by regimenting independent troops:
  - Dungleddy Yeomanry Cavalry, raised 1802
  - North Pembroke Yeomanry Cavalry (2 Trps), raised at Picton? 9 November 1803
  - Sir Hugh Owen's Orielton Yeomanry Cavalry (2 Trps), raised 7 November 1803

The Pembroke Cavalry was disbanded by 1810 leaving only the Castlemartin and Haverfordwest units at troop strength.

== 19th century ==
Although the militia and remaining infantry volunteers were stood down at the end of the Napoleonic Wars, the yeomanry was kept in being because of its usefulness for internal security. The Pembroke Yeomanry were called out to deal with corn riots at Fishguard in 1817. An additional troop was raised at Picton in 1819 and amalgamated with the Haverfordwest Cavalry. The government withdrew funding for the yeomanry in 1827 and they were disbanded. However, the two Pembrokeshire troops continued without pay until the revival of the yeomanry to deal with the growing civil unrest. The troops were re-accepted in 1830 and regimented to form the Castlemartin Yeomanry Cavalry. A St Bride's Troop was added in 1833.

The regiment was called out numerous times between 1839 and 1843 to deal with the Turnpike Gate Riots or Rebecca Riots. The first time was at Tavernspite in 1839, then at St Clears in neighbouring Carmarthenshire in 1843 when they were out for 26 days. From 26 June to 18 November 1843 the regiment was on continuous service (by alternate troops), a total of 171 days in support of the civil powers in the year. George Bowling of Holyland, near Pembroke, had been appointed Major-Commandant of the regiment on 10 April 1843.

Major-Commandant Bowling was succeeded by Captain Henry Leach of Corston House, a former officer in the Scots Fusilier Guards, who was promoted on 12 June 1852. Major Leach died in 1864 and Capt Baron de Rutzen, of Slebech Hall who had been first commissioned as a cornet in the regiment on 29 May 1847, was promoted to succeed him on 20 May 1864. (Note: The regiment appeared in the Army List as the Pembroke Yeomanry (Castlemartin), but officers were still gazetted to the 'Castlemartin Yeomanry' into the 1870s.)

In 1871 the Regulation of the Forces Act transferred control of the yeomanry from their county lords-lieutenant to the War Office. Regiments with fewer than four troops were required to raise the additional numbers or face disbandment or amalgamation. The Pembroke Yeomanry raised a fourth 'Dungleddy and North-East Troop', and the regiment was upgraded to a lieutenant-colonel's command: Maj Baron de Rutzen was promoted on 21 February 1871. At this time the regimental headquarters (RHQ) was at Haverfordwest.

In 1893 the yeomanry regiments were reorganised into squadrons:

- A Squadron:
  - A (Pembroke) Trp
  - B (Tenby & Narberth) Trp
- B Squadron:
  - C (Haverfordwest) Trp
  - D (Dungleddy & North-East) Trp

Also in 1893 the yeomanry regiments were brigaded in pairs, but the Pembroke regiment was the only one to remain unbrigaded, probably because of its remoteness. As a largely rural county the population of Pembrokeshire was too small to support a full regiment, and the Pembroke Yeomanry was now recruiting outside its borders in Carmarthenshire and Cardiganshire. The 'Field Troop' was raised at Llanelli in Carmarthenshire in 1899. Initially it formed part of A Sqn, but it was soon redesignated as C (Carmarthenshire) Sqn.

== Imperial Yeomanry ==
=== Second Boer War ===
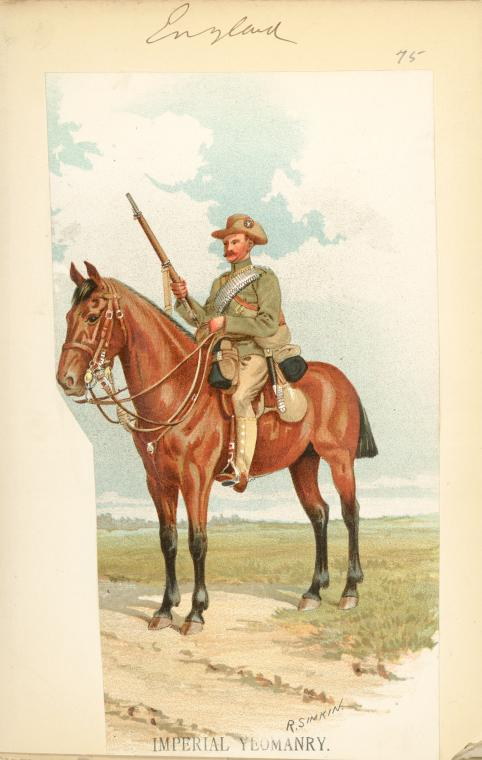
An Imperial Yeomanry trooper

Following a string of defeats during Black Week in early December 1899, the British government realised that it would need more troops than just the regular army to fight the Second Boer War. On 13 December, the decision to allow volunteer forces to serve in South Africa was made, and a Royal Warrant was issued on 24 December. This officially created the Imperial Yeomanry (IY). The force was organised as county service companies of approximately 115 men signed up for one year, and volunteers from the Yeomanry and civilians (usually middle and upper class) quickly filled the new force, which was equipped to operate as Mounted infantry. The Pembroke Yeomanry raised the 30th (Pembrokeshire) Company, which landed in South Africa on 6 April and served in 9th (Welsh) Battalion, IY. After the first contingent's tour of duty, a relief company was raised to replace them in 1901. Both companies saw considerable action.

The service of the 30th (Pembrokeshire) Company earned the regiment its second battle honour: South Africa, 1901.

The Imperial Yeomanry were trained and equipped as mounted infantry. The concept was considered a success and before the war ended the existing Yeomanry regiments at home were converted into Imperial Yeomanry, with an establishment of RHQ and four squadrons with a machine gun section. The regiment was redesignated the Pembroke Imperial Yeomanry (Castlemartin) in 1901 and raised D (Cardiganshire) Sqn at Lampeter in 1901. RHQ was now at The Norton drill hall, Tenby. On 27 January 1902 Lt-Col Frederick Meyrick (later Sir Frederick Meyrick, 2nd Baronet), a former officer in the 15th Hussars who had been commanding 5th Bn IY, in South Africa, was appointed commanding officer. (Note: In 1915 Meyrick was 'dug out' of retirement to command 2/1st South Wales Mounted Bde)

== Territorial Force ==
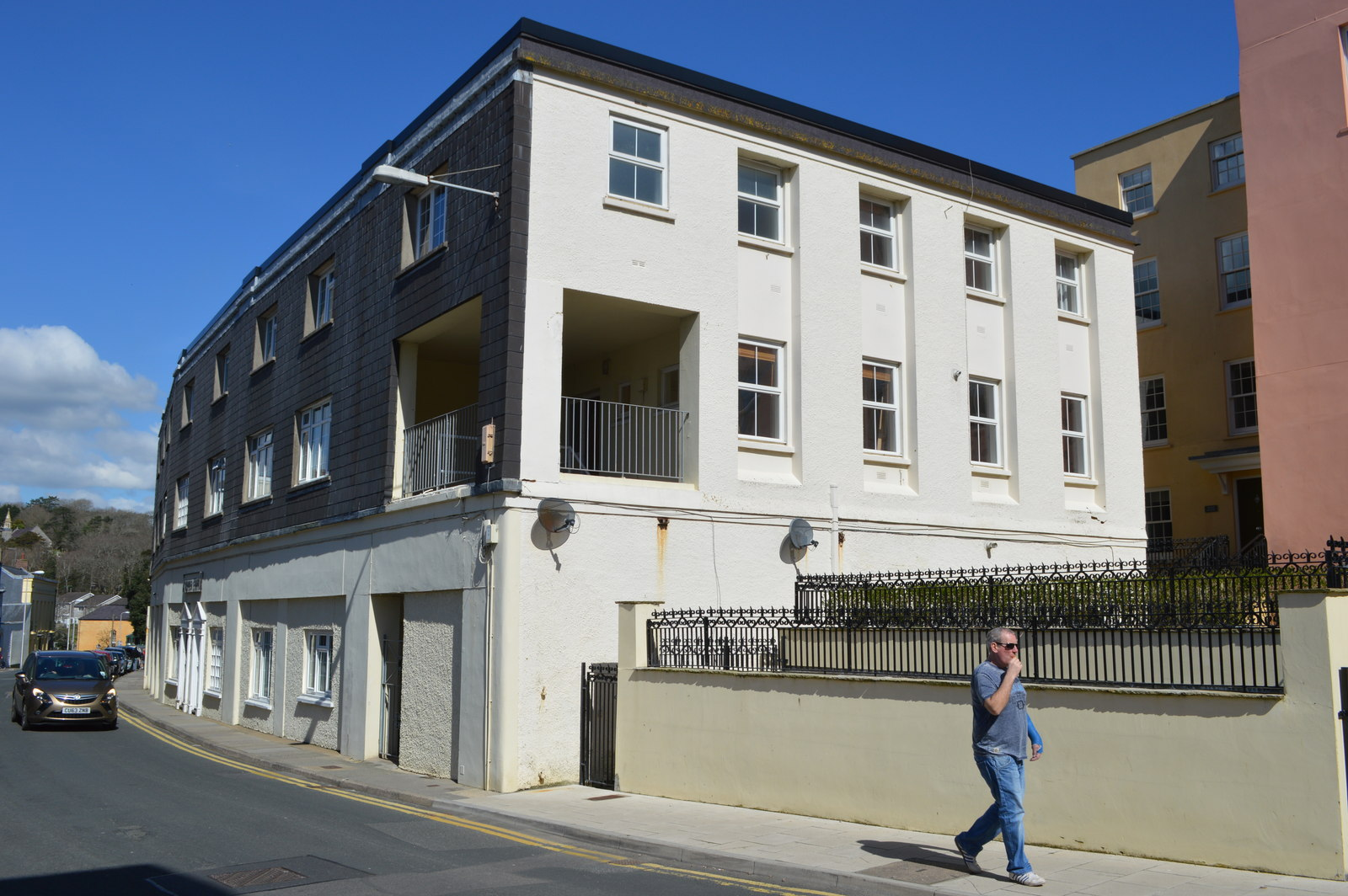
The Norton Drill Hall, Tenby, RHQ of the Pembroke Yeomanry from 1901.

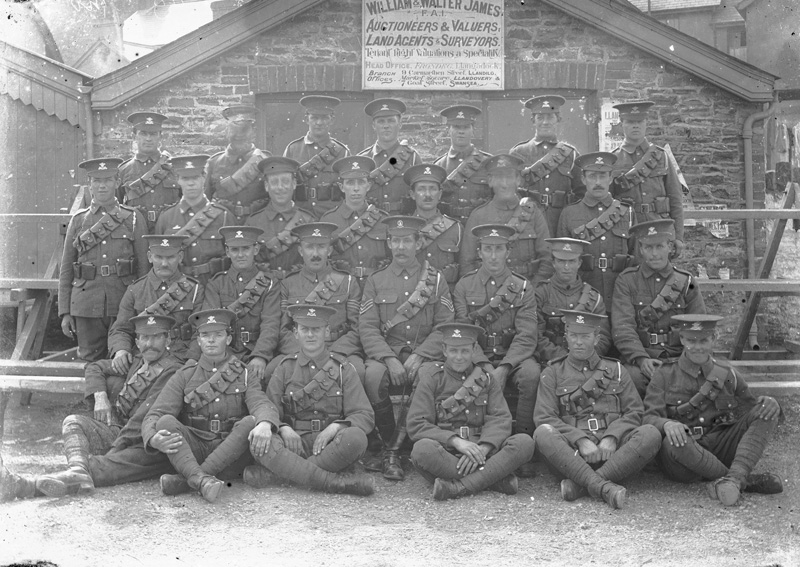
A group of the Pembroke Yeomanry ca 1912.

The Imperial Yeomanry were subsumed into the new Territorial Force (TF) under the Haldane Reforms of 1908. The Pembroke Yeomanry transferred on 1 April 1908, dropping 'Imperial' from its title. It was now organised as follows:

- RHQ at The Norton Drill Hall, Tenby
- A Sqn at Tenby, with drill stations at Main Street, Pembroke; Maiden Wells; St Florence; Manorbier; Kilgetty and Templeton
- B Sqn at Upper Market Street, Haverfordwest; with drill stations at Clarbeston Road; Newgale; Johnston; Newport; and Fishguard
- C Sqn at Carmarthen, with drill stations at Whitland; Murray Street, Llanelli; Crescent Road, Llandeilo; Llangadock; Pantglas; Ferryside; Pembroke Dock; and Llandovery
- D Sqn at Lampeter, with drill stations at Park Avenue, Aberystwyth; Tregaron; Llandysul; Aberaeron; and Llanybydder

The regiment formed part of the TF's South Wales Mounted Brigade, based at Carmarthen. Lieutenant-Col Ivor Philipps, DSO, MP, who had joined the regiment in 1903 after a career in the Indian Army, commanded it from 1908 to 1912. (Note: Philipps was 'dug out' of retirement in World War I and commanded 38th (Welsh) Infantry Division.)

== World War I ==
=== Mobilisation ===
When war was declared on 4 August 1914, the Pembroke Yeomanry mobilised at its drill halls under Lt-Col Owen Williams, TD, who had been in command since 1 October 1912. It joined the SWMB at Carmarthen and then went with it by train to Hereford.

In accordance with the Territorial and Reserve Forces Act 1907 (7 Edw. 7, c.9) which brought the TF into being, it was intended to be a home defence force for service during wartime and members could not be compelled to serve outside the country. However, on 10 August 1914 the TF was invited to volunteer for overseas service. In the SWMB the Montgomeryshire and Glamorgan Yeomanry signed up en masse at Hereford, though the Pembroke Yeomanry were less enthusiastic (many were later persuaded to change their minds and sign up). On 15 August the War Office issued instructions to separate those men who had signed up for Home Service only, and form these into reserve units. On 31 August, the formation of a reserve or 2nd Line unit was authorised for each 1st Line unit where 60 per cent or more of the men had volunteered for Overseas Service. The titles of these 2nd Line units would be the same as the original, but distinguished by a '2/' prefix. In this way duplicate battalions, brigades and divisions were created, mirroring those TF formations being sent overseas. Later, the 2nd Line was prepared for overseas service and a 3rd Line was formed to act as a reserve, providing trained replacements for the 1st and 2nd Line regiments.

=== 1/1st Pembroke Yeomanry ===
By the end of August 1914 the 1/1st SWMB including the 1/1st Pembroke Yeomanry joined the 1st Mounted Division. In November 1915, the brigade was dismounted. It was replaced in 1st Mounted Division by 2/1st Eastern Mounted Brigade when it departed for Egypt. With the brigade, the regiment was posted to Egypt in March 1916. On arrival a detachment from the regiment formed part of the Imperial Camel Corps. On 20 March, South Wales Mounted Brigade was absorbed into the 4th Dismounted Brigade.

=== 24th (Pembroke and Glamorgan Yeomanry) Battalion, Welsh Regiment ===
In March 1917 1/1st Pembroke Yeomanry were re-roled as infantry and together with the 1/1st Glamorgan Yeomanry were converted into 24th (Pembroke and Glamorgan Yeomanry) Battalion, Welsh Regiment. It joined 231st Brigade in the 74th (Yeomanry) Division and took part in the Third Battle of Gaza, the Battle of Beersheba, the capture and defence of Jerusalem and the Battle of Tell 'Asur.

In May 1918, the Division moved to the Western Front, and the battalion saw action in the Hundred Days Offensive, including the Second Battle of Bapaume, the Battle of Épehy, (Note: Among those killed near Gillemont Farm on 21 September 1918 was Lt David Clemetson, one of the first black officers commissioned into the British Army. Born in Jamaica, he was at Cambridge University when World War I broke out and he enlisted in the 23rd (Service) Battalion (1st Sportsman's), Royal Fusiliers. He was commissioned into the Pembroke Yeomanry on 27 October 1915, and served with 1/1st Pembrokes and 24th Welsh in Palestine and on the Western Front.) and the final advance in Artois and Flanders. The 24th Welch entered Ath on 11 November 1918, only two and a half hours before hostilities ceased.

=== 2/1st Pembroke Yeomanry ===
The 2nd Line regiment was formed in 1914. Early in 1915 it joined the 2/1st South Wales Mounted Brigade at Carmarthen and later moved to Llandeilo and Dorchester. In September 1915, it moved with the brigade to the Yoxford area and joined the 1st Mounted Division. On 31 March 1916, the remaining Mounted Brigades were ordered to be numbered in a single sequence and the brigade became 4th Mounted Brigade. The regiment was based at Southwold during the raid by Admiral Boedicker's battle cruisers on Lowestoft in 1916.

In July 1916 there was a major reorganisation of 2nd Line yeomanry units in the United Kingdom. All but 12 regiments were converted to cyclists and as a consequence the regiment was dismounted and the brigade converted to 2nd Cyclist Brigade (and the division to 1st Cyclist Division). Further reorganization in November 1916 saw the regiment departing for the 1st Cyclist Brigade where it was amalgamated with the 2/1st Glamorgan Yeomanry as the 2nd (Pembroke and Glamorgan) Yeomanry Cyclist Regiment. (Note: James also names the combined unit as 2nd (Pembroke and Glamorgan Yeomanry) Cyclist Battalion which agrees with Frederick.) The regiment resumed its separate identity as 2/1st Pembroke Yeomanry in March 1917 at Aldeburgh. It moved to Benacre in July and to Lowestoft at the end of the year. It was still at Lowestoft in 1st Cyclist Brigade at the end of the war.

=== 3/1st Pembroke Yeomanry ===
The 3rd Line regiment was formed at Carmarthen in 1915 and moved to Brecon. In the summer of 1915 it was affiliated to a Reserve Cavalry Regiment in Ireland. In the summer of 1916 it was attached to the 3rd Line Groups of the Welsh Division at Oswestry as its 1st Line was serving as infantry. The regiment was disbanded in early 1917 with personnel transferring to the 2nd Line or to the 4th (Reserve) Battalion of the Welsh Regiment at Milford Haven.

== Interwar ==
The TF was reconstituted on 7 February 1920 and the Pembroke Yeomanry reformed at Carmarthen Barracks. However, experience from World War I showed that the TF had a surplus of cavalry, so only the 14 senior yeomanry regiments remained as horsed cavalry, the remainder converting to other roles, mainly in the Royal Field Artillery (RFA). The Pembroke Yeomanry (ranked 17th) was converted on 3 September 1920 into 102nd (Pembroke and Cardigan) Brigade, RFA (Note: In contemporary RA usage a brigade was a lieutenant-colonel's command consisting of batteries 'brigaded' together; it was not comparable with an infantry or cavalry brigade commanded by a brigadier-general. In the Territorials, unlike the Regulars, unit heritage is carried by the brigade/regiment, rather than the battery.) with the following organisation:

- Brigade HQ at Greenhill Avenue, Tenby
- 405 (Pembroke) Battery at Bush Camp, Pembroke Dock – from A Sqn
- 406 (Pembroke) Battery (Howitzer) at Haverfordwest – from B & C Sqns
- 407 (Cardigan) Battery at Cardigan (Note: The Cardiganshire Battery of 2nd Welsh Brigade, RFA, at Aberystwyth was not reformed in 1920, and there was no direct link between that unit and the new Cardigan batteries.) – from D Sqn
- 408 (Cardigan) Battery at Aberystwyth – from D Sqn

In 1924 the RFA was subsumed into the Royal Artillery (RA), and the word 'Field' was inserted into the titles of its brigades and batteries. The 102nd was defined as an 'Army Field Brigade' serving as 'Army Troops' in 53rd (Welsh) Divisional Area. The establishment of a TA artillery brigade was four 6-gun batteries, three equipped with 18-pounder guns and one with 4.5-inch howitzers, all of World War I patterns. However, the batteries only held four guns in peacetime. The guns and their first-line ammunition wagons were still horsedrawn and the battery staffs were mounted. Partial mechanisation was carried out from 1927, but the guns retained iron-tyred wheels until pneumatic tyres began to be introduced just before World War II.

By 1930 the HQ of 102nd (Pembroke & Cardigan) Army Brigade had moved to Carmarthen Barracks, and by December 1934 it was at Haverfordwest. In 1931 the Pembroke batteries changed their subtitles to 'Pembroke Yeomanry' and in 1937 'Cardigan' in the brigade and battery titles was altered to 'Cardiganshire'.

In 1938 the RA modernised its nomenclature and a lieutenant-colonel's command was designated a 'regiment' rather than a 'brigade'; this applied to TA field brigades from 1 November 1938. The TA was doubled in size after the Munich Crisis, and most regiments formed duplicates. Part of the reorganisation was that field regiments changed from four six-gun batteries to an establishment of two batteries, each of three four-gun troops. For the Pembroke & Cardigan regiment this resulted in the following organisation from 8 July 1939:

102nd (Pembroke & Cardiganshire) Field Regiment

- Regimental HQ at Pembroke Dock
- 405 (Pembroke Yeomanry) Field Battery at Pembroke Dock
- 406 (Pembroke Yeomanry) Field Battery at Haverfordwest

146th Field Regiment

- RHQ at Aberystwyth
- 407 (Cardiganshire) Field Battery at Cardigan
- 408 (Cardiganshire) Field Battery at Aberystwyth

== World War II ==
38th (Welsh) Division's formation sign.

=== Mobilisation and Home Defence ===
When the TA was mobilised on 1 September, just ahead of the outbreak of World War II on 3 September, both regiments were assigned to 38th (Welsh) Infantry Division, the duplicate of 53rd (Welsh) Division that was being formed in Western Command. This new division became operational on 18 September 1939.

Until 14 July 1940 the division was undergoing training in south-east Wales in Western Command. Then, after the British Expeditionary Force's evacuation from Dunkirk, 38th (W) Division was stationed around Liverpool. On 16 April 1941 the division moved to defend invasion-threatened Sussex.

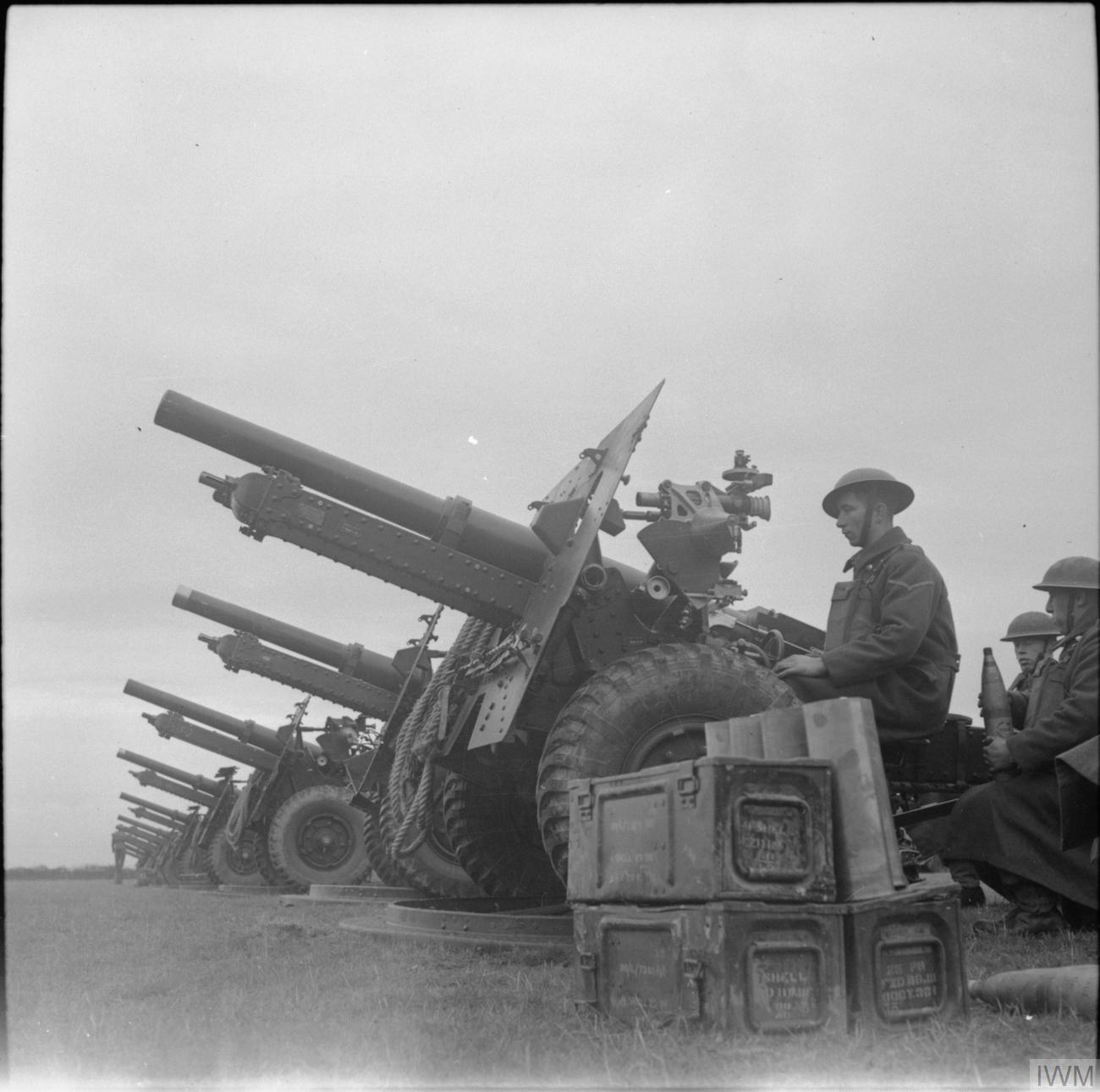
25-pounder guns of 408 Battery, 146th Field Rgt at Littlehampton, Sussex, 14 November 1941.

On 1 December 1941 38th (W) Division was placed on a lower establishment; this meant that it was not going to be sent overseas for the foreseeable future, and it became a static coast defence formation. As the invasion threat receded, the lower establishment divisions became sources of units and drafts to reinforce the fighting formations overseas. 102nd (P&C) Field Rgt was one of the first units to leave, on 23 November 1941, followed by 146th Field Rgt on 13 May 1942.

=== 102nd (Pembroke & Cardiganshire) Field Regiment ===
102nd (P&C) Field Rgt landed at Algiers in February 1942 and took part in the Tunisian campaign, including the fighting at 'Hunt's Gap'. After the fall of Tunis and the end of the campaign 102nd (P&C) Fd Rgt was not required for the Allied invasion of Sicily.

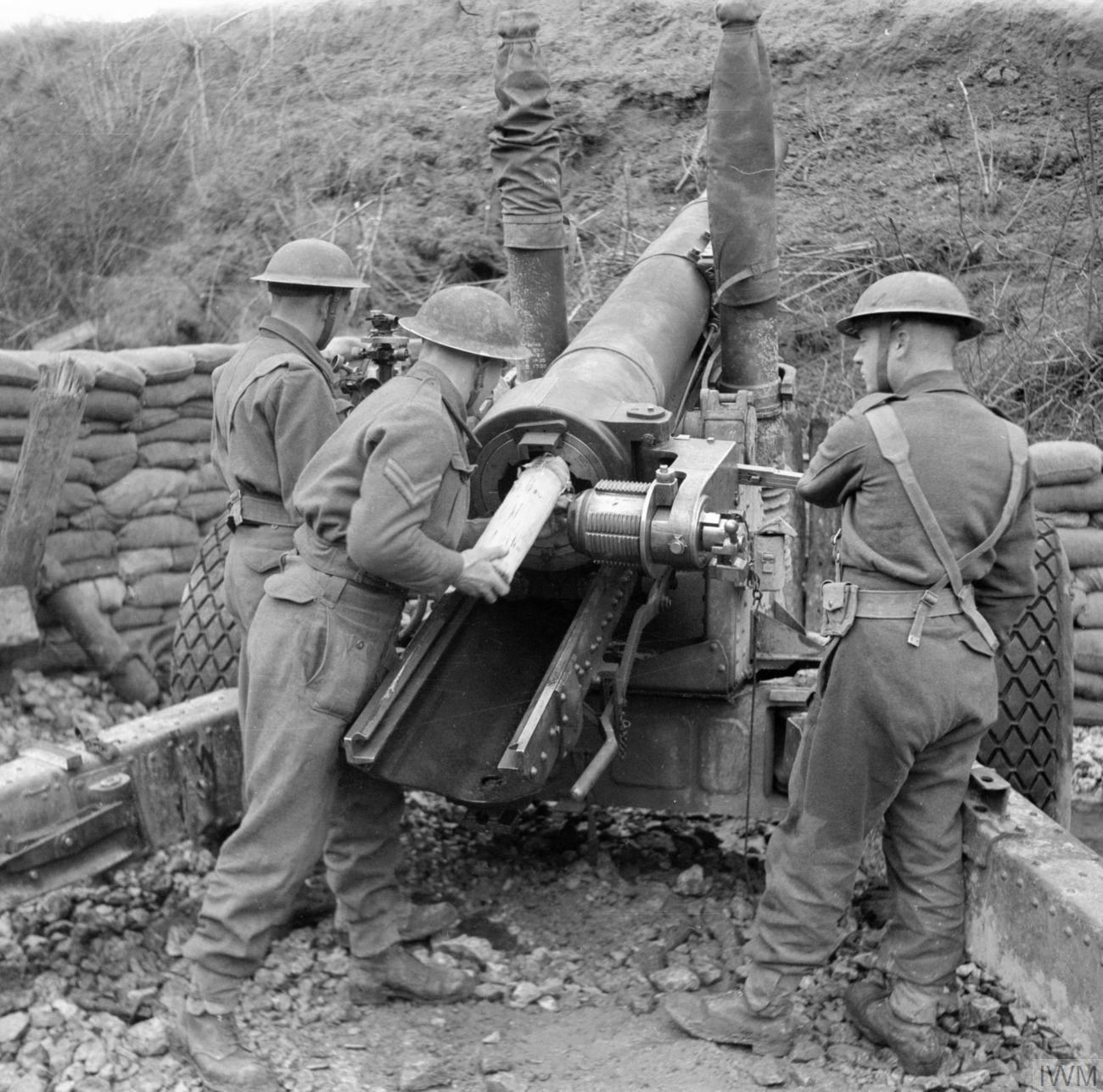
102nd Medium Regiment (Pembroke Yeomanry) with 5.5-inch medium gun, Italy 1944 (IWM NA12381)

=== 102nd (Pembroke Yeomanry) Medium Regiment ===
The regiment remained in North Africa and on 18 September 1943 was converted into 102nd (Pembroke Yeomanry) Medium Regiment (its title finally reflecting the departure of the Cardigan batteries). It landed in Italy to join Eighth Army in December 1943 and fought in the Italian Campaign, including the battles round Monte Cassino and the breaching of the Gothic Line (Operation Olive). By the end of the war the regiment was on the banks of the River Po. 102nd (Pembroke Yeomanry) Medium Regiment and its batteries passed into suspended animation on 15 January 1946.

=== 146th (Pembroke & Cardiganshire) Field Regiment ===
When TA duplicate units were authorised to adopt their parent's subtitles on 17 February 1942, the 146th was given the 'Pembroke & Cardigan' title, even though it only had the Cardigan batteries. After it left 38th (W) Division the regiment was sent by sea to reinforce Eighth Army fighting the Western Desert Campaign; it landed at Suez in September 1942. It formed part of 'Hammerforce' for the Second Battle of El Alamein, then joined 7th Armoured Division during the subsequent pursuit to the frontier of Tunisia. It took part in the battles of Medenine, the Mareth Line and Wadi Akarit. 7th Armoured Division pursued the enemy the Enfidaville position and then switched to First Army for the final push to capture Tunis (Operations Vulcan and Strike) in May 1943.

7th Armoured Division landed in Italy in September and entered Naples on 1 October. It was involved in the fighting on the Volturno. 7th Armoured Division was then withdrawn from the fighting to return to the UK to prepare for the Allied invasion of Normandy (Operation Overlord). 146th (P&C) Field Rgt left the division on 6 November when it supported the attack on 'Bare Arse Ridge' by 201st Guards Brigade.

=== 146th (Pembroke & Cardiganshire) Medium Regiment ===
However, 146th (P&C) Field Rgt had also been selected for conversion to medium artillery and to take part in Overlord. It was redesignated 146th (Pembroke & Cardiganshire) Medium Regiment on 16 December and returned to the UK.

The regiment landed in Normandy on 15 July 1944 as part of 8th Army Group Royal Artillery (8th AGRA) in time to take part in Operation Goodwood. 8th AGRA was loaned to II Canadian Corps for the subsidiary Operation Spring on 25 July, then moved secretly across the beachhead to join VIII Corps' attack on 30 July (Operation Bluecoat), supporting 15th (Scottish) Infantry Division. After the breakout from the Normandy beachhead VIII Corps was 'grounded' and only played a minor part in Operation Market Garden. In October it was engaged in clearing the Venlo 'Pocket', culminating in December when 8th AGRA supported 15th (S) Division once more for Operation Guildford to take the last German bridgehead on the River Maas at Blerick. 146th (P&C) Medium Rgt was assigned to 52nd (Lowland) Infantry Division for the crossing of the Rhine (Operation Plunder) but all that division's guns fired in support of 15th (S) Division's successful assault crossing.

After the war 146th (Pembroke & Cardiganshire) Medium Regiment passed into suspended animation on 9 January 1946 and was not reformed in the postwar TA: it was officially disbanded on 1 January 1947.

== Postwar ==
When the TA was reconstituted on 1 January 1947, 102nd (PY) Medium Rgt was reformed as 302 (Pembroke Yeomanry) Field Regiment. with RHQ at Haverfordwest. It was part of the divisional artillery of 53rd (W) Division. On 31 October 1956 it absorbed the Pembroke batteries of the 408th (Glamorgan and Pembroke) Coast Regiment, RA.

The TA was reorganised on 1 May 1961, when the regiment reverted to its original title as the Pembroke Yeomanry (Castlemartin) when it re-roled in the Royal Armoured Corps as an independent reconnaissance squadron affiliated to the Shropshire Yeomanry, while some personnel transferred to 4th Battalion, Welch Regiment.

When the TA was reduced into the Territorial and Army Volunteer Reserve (TAVR) on 1 April 1967, the regiment formed A (Pembroke Yeomanry) Company in the reorganised 4th (T) Bn Welch Regiment (TAVR III), and A (Pembroke Yeomanry) Troop in 223 (South Wales) Squadron of 157 (Wales and Midland) Transport Regiment (V), Royal Corps of Transport, (TAVR II). The 'Volunteer' units in TAVR II were intended to reinforce the Regular Army in time of war and the 'Territorials' of TAVR III were for home service.

=== 224 (Pembroke Yeomanry) Transport Squadron ===
TAVR III was disbanded on 1 January 1969 and its units were reduced to cadres. The cadre of 4th Bn Welch joined A Troop of 223 (South Wales) Sqn to form a new 224 (West Wales) Sqn at Haverfordwest in 157 Transport Rgt. It was redesignated as 224 (Pembroke Yeomanry) Transport Squadron in 1987. The Royal Corps of Transport was absorbed into the Royal Logistic Corps (RLC) on 1 April 1994 when 224 (PY) Sqn became an engineer support squadron based at Carmarthen, including a troop at Llanelli from A Company of 4th (V) Bn Royal Regiment of Wales. The troop at Llanelli was closed on 1 July 1999. By 2008 224 (PY) Sqn was once again designated a transport squadron, with HQ at Carmarthen and a troop at Haverfordwest.

It remains part of 157 (Welsh) Regiment RLC, in the Army Reserve.

== Heritage and ceremonial ==
=== Uniforms and insignia ===
In 1850 the regiment was dressed as Hussars, in blue jackets with buff facings and silver/white hussar lace, with a black Shako. The appointments bore the letters 'C.Y.C.' (for Castlemartin Yeomanry Cavalry).

On the eve of the Boer War the regiment wore a Shell jacket in dark blue, closely braided with white cord, and with white facings. The head-dress was a fur Busby with white bag and plume. The blue pantaloons or overalls bore white stripes. The officers' Sabretaches and the horses' throat plumes were also white.

After the Boer War the Imperial Yeomanry adopted a khaki service dress with the typical Slouch hat of the IY, replaced in about 1906 by the Service cap. The pre-war uniform was retained for full dress occasions.

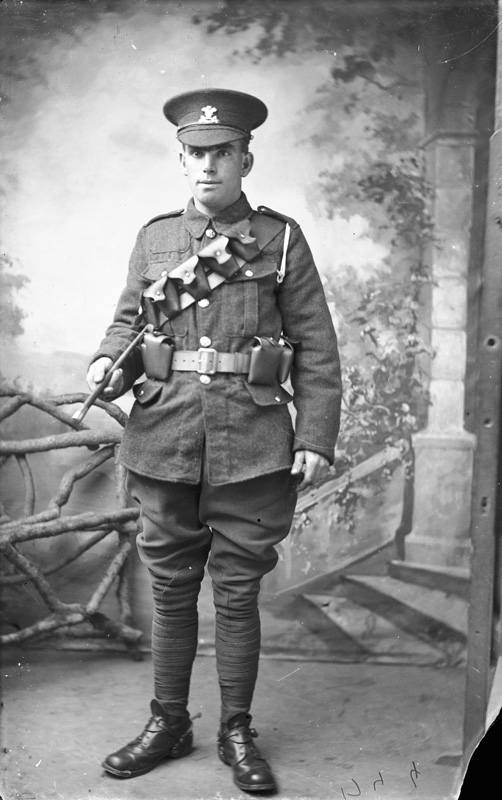
Soldier of the Pembroke Yeomanry, World War I.

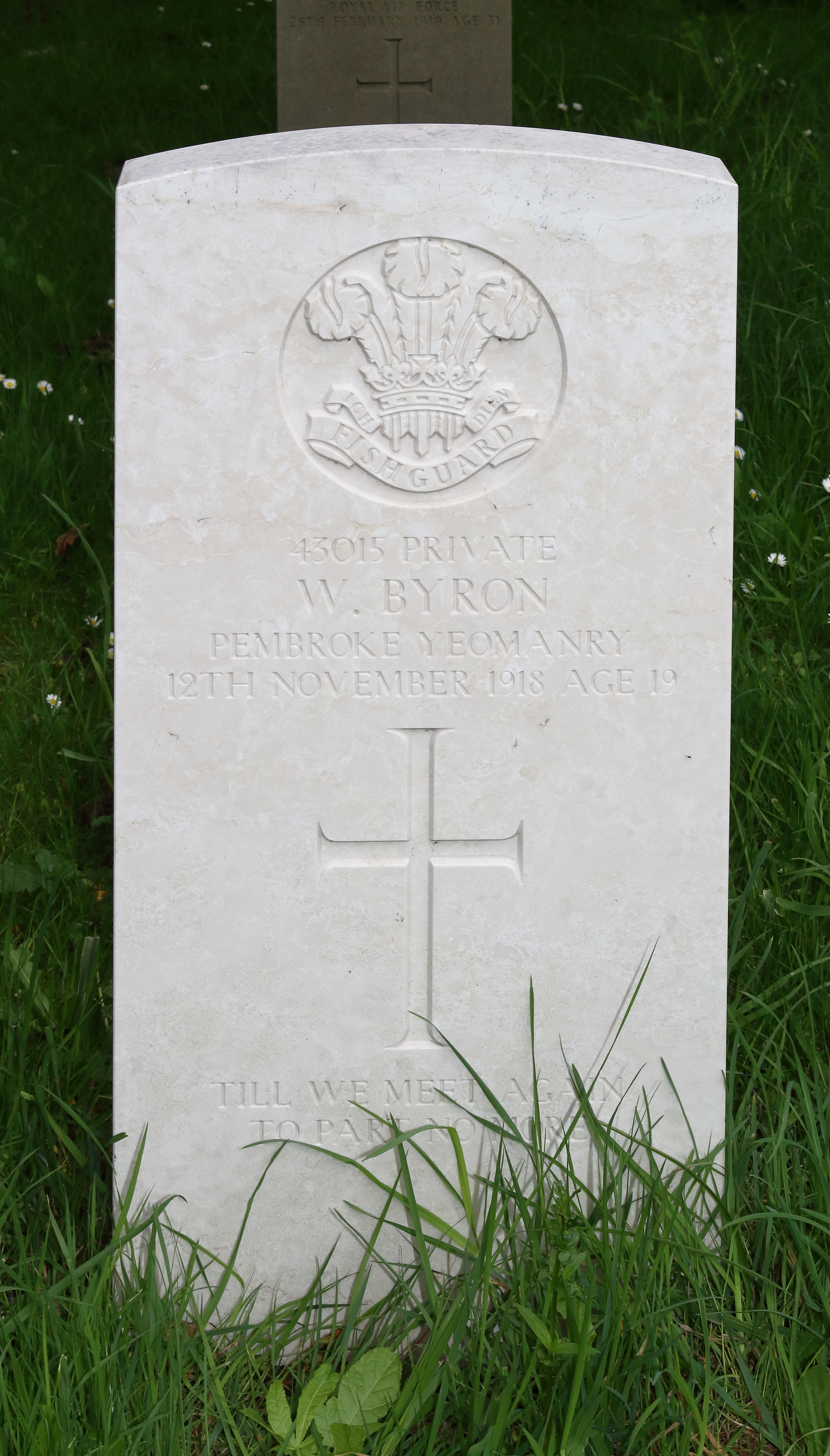
Commonwealth War Graves Commission gravestone showing the Pembroke Yeomanry badge.

In the TF the parade and walking out uniform of the Pembroke Yeomanry consisted of a dark blue peaked cap, tunic and overalls. The cap band, shoulder straps and trouser stripe were white. Officers were distinguished by silver shoulder cords and white pouch belts. The plain khaki service dress of the regular cavalry was worn from 1908 onwards, replacing the blue uniform for all occasions after 1914. The service dress was in turn replaced by battledress or other standard British Army uniforms during and after World War II.

When the regiment was first converted to artillery it continued to wear its Pembroke Yeomanry cap badge, consisting of the Prince of Wales's feathers, coronet and 'Ich Dien' motto, with a scroll beneath carrying the unique Battle honour 'Fishguard'. However it was later badged as Royal Artillery. In 1933 the CO, Lt-Col L.H. Higgon, re-introduced the Pembroke Yeomanry badge as a collar badge, which was worn during World War II. 146th (P&C) Medium Rgt continued this tradition, leading to its nickname 'Fishguard Express'. After the war 302 (PY) Field Rgt reintroduced the Pembroke Yeomanry badge for cap and collar, cavalry shoulder chains were authorised on No 1 dress, and the Pembroke Yeomanry dark blue-silver-red Stable belt was worn in place of the RA belt.

=== Guidon ===
The regiment's guidon, of light blue silk, carried the regimental badge (the Prince of Wales's feathers, coronet and motto, with 'Fishguard' beneath) with scrolls either side inscribed 'Castlemartin' and 'Yeomanry'. Although it was normal for regiments to 'lay up' their Regimental standards at a suitable location (town hall or church) before proceeding overseas, the 24th (Pembroke & Glamorgan Yeomanry) Battalion took the Pembrokeshire Yeomanry's guidon to France and carried it on all possible occasions during the war, such as guard-mounting. When the regiment converted to Royal Artillery, which does not carry Regimental colours, the guidon was retired in 1923

=== Honours ===
The Pembroke Yeomanry was awarded the following Battle Honours:

- French Revolutionary War: **Fishguard**
- Second Boer War: **South Africa, 1901**
- World War I: Somme 1918, Bapaume, 1918, **Hindenburg Line**, **Épehy**, **Pursuit to Mons**, **France & Flanders, 1918**, **Egypt, 1916–17**, **Gaza**, **Jerusalem**, **Jericho**, **Tell 'Asur**, **Palestine, 1917–18**

The regiment was awarded the World War I battle honours to which it was entitled, and those in bold would have been emblazoned on the guidon, but that had already been retired (see above). The Royal Artillery does not receive battle honours (its motto, Ubique ('Everywhere') granted by William IV in 1833 is deemed to cover all engagements), so none were awarded for World War II.

In 1946 the Pembroke Yeomanry received the Freedom of the Town and County of Haverfordwest, and in 1997 on the bicentenary of the Battle of Fishguard 224 Squadron was given the Freedom of Fishguard and Goodwick, accepted by the Princess Royal.

=== Honorary Colonels ===
The following served as Honorary Colonel of the regiment:

- Baron de Rutzen, former CO, appointed 22 May 1878
- Sir Owen Scourfield, 2nd Baronet, TD, appointed 2 August 1890
- Col Herbert Davies-Evans, Lord Lieutenant of Cardiganshire
- Brig-Gen Sir Frederick Meyrick, 2nd Baronet, CB, CMG, former CO, appointed 1 December 1928, died 1932
- Lt-Col Sir George Roberts, OBE, TD, former CO, appointed 28 July 1932
- Col Sir Thomas Meyrick, 3rd Baronet, former major in the regiment, appointed 3 September 1954
- Maj The Hon R. Hanning Phillips, MBE, appointed 3 September 1959, to 1967

== See also ==
- Imperial Yeomanry
- List of Yeomanry Regiments 1908
- Yeomanry
- Yeomanry order of precedence
- British yeomanry during the First World War
- Second line yeomanry regiments of the British Army
- List of British Army Yeomanry Regiments converted to Royal Artillery

== Bibliography ==
- Anon, British Army of the Rhine Battlefield Tour: Operation Bluecoat, Germany: BAOR, 1947/Uckfield: Naval and Military Press, 2021, ISBN 978-1-78331-812-4.
- Anon, British Army of the Rhine Battlefield Tour: Operation Plunder, Germany: BAOR, 1947/Uckfield: Naval and Military Press, 2022, ISBN 978-1-4745-3532-8.
- Maj A.F. Becke,History of the Great War: Order of Battle of Divisions, Part 2a: The Territorial Force Mounted Divisions and the 1st-Line Territorial Force Divisions (42–56), London: HM Stationery Office, 1935/Uckfield: Naval & Military Press, 2007, ISBN 1-84734-739-8.
- Maj A.F. Becke,History of the Great War: Order of Battle of Divisions, Part 2b: The 2nd-Line Territorial Force Divisions (57th–69th), with the Home-Service Divisions (71st–73rd) and 74th and 75th Divisions, London: HM Stationery Office, 1937/Uckfield: Naval & Military Press, 2007, ISBN 1-84734-739-8.
- J. Campbell, 'The Pembroke Yeomanry (Castlemartin)', Journal of the Society for Army Historical Research, Vol 12, No 46 (Summer 1933), pp. 114–6. JSTOR 44226085
- Basil Collier, History of the Second World War, United Kingdom Military Series: The Defence of the United Kingdom, London: HM Stationery Office, 1957/Uckfield: Naval & Military, 2004, ISBN 978-1-84574-055-9.
- Col John K. Dunlop, The Development of the British Army 1899–1914, London: Methuen, 1938.
- Maj L.F. Ellis, History of the Second World War, United Kingdom Military Series: Victory in the West, Vol II: The Defeat of Germany, London: HM Stationery Office, 1968/Uckfield: Naval & Military, 2004, ISBN 1-84574-059-9.
- J.B.M. Frederick, Lineage Book of British Land Forces 1660–1978, Vol I, Wakefield: Microform Academic, 1984, ISBN 1-85117-007-3.
- J.B.M. Frederick, Lineage Book of British Land Forces 1660–1978, Vol II, Wakefield: Microform Academic, 1984, ISBN 1-85117-009-X.
- Maj-Gen B.P. Hughes, Honour titles of the Royal Artillery, Woolwich: Royal Artillery Institution, 1975.
- Brig E.A. James, British Regiments 1914–18, London: Samson Books, 1978, ISBN 0-906304-03-2/Uckfield: Naval & Military Press, 2001, ISBN 978-1-84342-197-9.
- Steven John, Welsh Yeomanry at War: A History of the 24th (Pembroke & Glamorgan Yeomanry) Battalion, The Welsh Regiment, Barnsley: Pen & Sword, 2016, ISBN 978-1-4738-3362-3.
- Lt-Col H.F. Joslen, Orders of Battle, United Kingdom and Colonial Formations and Units in the Second World War, 1939–1945, London: HM Stationery Office, 1960/London: London Stamp Exchange, 1990, ISBN 0-948130-03-2/Uckfield: Naval & Military Press, 2003, ISBN 1-84342-474-6.
- 'J.H.L' (Lt-Col J.H. Leslie?), 'Fishguard, Pembrokeshire – 1797', Journal of the Society for Army Historical Research, Vol 6, No 46 (October 1927), pp. 248–9. JSTOR 44227631
- N.B. Leslie, Battle Honours of the British and Indian Armies 1695–1914, London: Leo Cooper, 1970, ISBN 0-85052-004-5.
- Norman E.H. Litchfield, The Territorial Artillery 1908–1988 (Their Lineage, Uniforms and Badges), Nottingham: Sherwood Press, 1992, ISBN 0-9508205-2-0.
- Col K. W. Maurice-Jones, The History of Coast Artillery in the British Army, London: Royal Artillery Institution, 1959/Uckfield: Naval & Military Press, 2005, ISBN 978-1-84574-031-3.
- Brig C.J.C. Molony, History of the Second World War, United Kingdom Military Series: The Mediterranean and Middle East, Vol V: The Campaign in Sicily 1943 and the Campaign in Italy 3rd September 1943 to 31st March 1944, London: HM Stationery Office, 1973/Uckfield, Naval & Military Press, 2004, ISBN 1-84574-069-6.
- Bryn Owen, History of the Welsh Militia and Volunteer Corps 1757–1908: Carmarthenshire, Pembrokeshire and Cardiganshire, Part 1: Regiments of Militia, Wrexham: Bridge Books, 1995, ISBN 1-872424-51-1.
- Bryn Owen, History of the Welsh Militia and Volunteer Corps 1757–1908: Montgomeryshire Regiments of Militia, Volunteers and Yeomanry Cavalry, Wrexham: Bridge Books, 2000, ISBN 1-872424-85-6.
- Rinaldi, Richard A (2008). Order of Battle of the British Army 1914. Ravi Rikhye. ISBN 978-0-9776072-8-0.
- Col H.C.B. Rogers, The Mounted Troops of the British Army 1066–1945, London: Seeley Service, 1959.
- Lt-Col Ernest Ryan, 'Arms, Uniforms and Equipment of the Yeomanry Cavalry', Journal of the Society for Army Historical Research, September 1957, Vol 35, pp. 124–33. JSTOR 44228854
- Lt-Col Ernest Ryan, 'The Post-South African War Yeomanry', Journal of the Society for Army Historical Research, June 1960, Vol 38, pp. 57–62. JSTOR 44223318
- Lt-Col J.D. Sainsbury, The Hertfordshire Yeomanry Regiments, Royal Artillery, Part 1: The Field Regiments 1920-1946, Welwyn: Hertfordshire Yeomanry and Artillery Trust/Hart Books, 1999, ISBN 0-948527-05-6.
- Arthur Sleigh, The Royal Militia and Yeomanry Cavalry Army List, April 1850, London: British Army Despatch Press, 1850/Uckfield: Naval and Military Press, 1991, ISBN 978-1-84342-410-9.
- Edward M. Spiers, The Army and Society 1815–1914, London: Longmans, 1980, ISBN 0-582-48565-7.
- Col C.P. Stacey, Official History of the Canadian Army in the Second World War, Vol III: The Victory Campaign – The Operations in North-West Europe 1944–1945, Ottawa: Queen's Printer & Controller of Stationery, 1960. Archived 21 December 2020 at the Wayback Machine
- Philip Talbot, 'The English Yeomanry in the Nineteenth Century and the Great Boer War', Journal of the Society for Army Historical Research, Spring 2001, Vol 79, No 317, pp. 45–62. JSTOR 44230659
- Lt-Col Will Townend & Frank Baldwin, Gunners in Normandy: The History of the Royal Artillery in North-West Europe January 1942 to August 1944, Cheltenham: History Press, 2020, ISBN 978-0-7509-9044-8.
- War Office, A List of the Officers of the Militia, the Gentlemen & Yeomanry Cavalry, and Volunteer Infantry of the United Kingdom, 11th Edn, London: War Office, 14 October 1805/Uckfield: Naval and Military Press, 2005, ISBN 978-1-84574-207-2.
- War Office, Titles and Designations of Formations and Units of the Territorial Army, London: War Office, 7 November 1927 (RA sections also summarised in Litchfield, Appendix IV).

=== External links ===
- Anglo-Boer War
- Chris Baker, The Long, Long Trail
- British Army units from 1945 on
- The Drill Hall Project
- Orders of Battle at Patriot Files Archived 26 March 2023 at the Wayback Machine
- Land Forces of Britain, the Empire and Commonwealth – Regiments.org (archive site)
- Roll of Honour
