= The Norton drill hall, Tenby =

The Norton drill hall
- Tenby
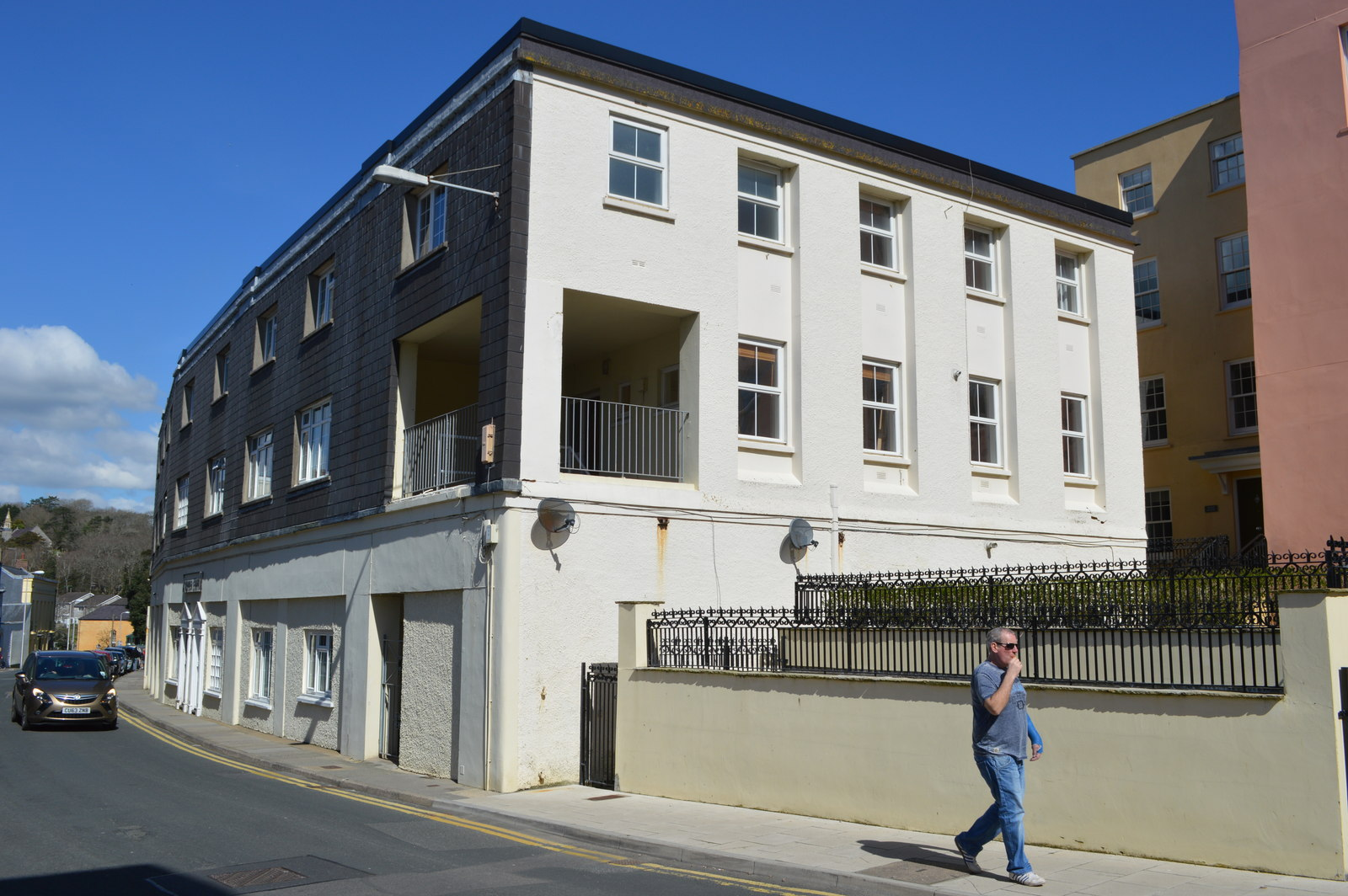
- The Norton drill hall

Site information
- Type: Drill hall

Location
- Location within Pembrokeshire
- Coordinates: 51.67439°N 4.70230°W

Site history
- Built: Early 20th century
- Built for: War Office
- In use: Early 20th century – Present

The Norton drill hall is a former military installation in Tenby, Wales.

== History ==
The building was established as the drill hall for "A Squadron" of the Pembroke Yeomanry. "A Squadron" became co-located with the headquarters for the regiment after Yeomanry Headquarters was re-organised at Tenby in 1901. The regiment was mobilised at Tenby in August 1914 before being deployed to Egypt but, after the headquarters moved to Haverfordwest, the drill hall was converted for residential use and is now known as "Regency Court".
