= Allan Glaisyer Minns =

Doctor and mayor (1858–1930)

Allan Glaisyer Minns MRCS, LRCP
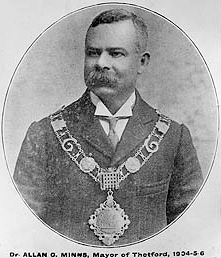

Mayor of Thetford
- In office 1904–1906

Personal details
- Born: Allan Glaisyer Minns; 19 October 1858 Inagua, The Bahamas
- Died: 16 September 1930 (aged 71) Dorking, Surrey, England
- Education: Guy's Hospital London

Allan Glaisyer Minns (1858 – 1930) was a medical doctor and the first man of colour to become a mayor in Britain.

== Early life ==
Born in the island of Inagua in the Bahamas, Minns was one of the nine children and the youngest son of John Minns (1811–1863), a doctor, and Ophelia (née Bunch) Minns (1817–1902).

His grandfather, also called John Minns, had emigrated about 1801 from England to the Bahamas, where he married Rosetta, a former African slave; she had saved his life after a shipwreck. Their story was recounted in A Tribute for the Negro (1848) by Wilson Armistead.

== Education and medical career ==
Minns was educated at Nassau Grammar School and Guy's Hospital in London. He was registered with the British Medical Association on 14 February 1884; his qualifications were MRCS (1881), and LRCP (1884).

He was based in Thetford, Norfolk, from 1885 until 1923, when he moved to Dorking in Surrey. His eldest brother, Pembroke Minns (1840–1912), was already in medical practice in Thetford when he moved there.

== Political career ==
Minns was elected to the town council of Thetford in 1903, and the next year was elected as mayor, serving two one-year terms as mayor, the first known Black mayor in England. John Archer, who was elected mayor of Battersea in 1913, had initially been thought to be the first Black British mayor. However, in reporting Archer's election, the American Negro Year Book (1914) noted that "[i]n 1904, Mr. Allen Glaser Minns [sic], a colored man from the West Indies, was elected mayor of the borough of Thetford, Norfolk."

== Personal life ==
Minns was twice married; first in 1888 to Emily Pearson (1859–1892) and then to Gertrude Ann Morton in 1896. He had two daughters and one son with his first wife, and two daughters with his second.

His son Allan Noel Minns (1891–1921), also a doctor, was one of the few Black officers to serve in the British Army during the First World War.

== Death ==
Allan Glaisyer Minns died, aged 71, at his home, Thetford Lodge in Dorking, on 16 September 1930.
