= Allan Noel Minns =

English doctor and soldier (1891–1921)

Allan Noel Minns, DSO, MC, (23 March 1891 – 6 April 1921) was an English medical doctor of African-Caribbean descent who served as an officer in the British Army during the First World War.

He was born in Thetford, Norfolk in 1891, the son of the Bahamian Allan Glaisyer Minns and Emily née Pearson. His father was a doctor and later mayor of Thetford, the first black man to be the mayor of an English town. Educated at Thetford Grammar School, Allan junior followed his father by attending Guy's Hospital, qualifying as a doctor in 1914.

After volunteering for the Royal Army Medical Corps he was commissioned as a lieutenant in September 1914, rising to the rank of captain in March 1918. He saw active service in Gallipoli and Mesopotamia. He was awarded two medals for bravery – the Military Cross in 1915 for gallantry at Suvla Bay on 30 August, and the Distinguished Service Order in December 1916. The citation for the MC reads "For conspicuous gallantry and devotion to duty at Suvla Bay, Gallipoli Peninsula, on 30th August 1915, when attending to the wounded under heavy shrapnel fire. Another officer who was assisting him was killed. Lt. Minns later returned to the dressing station, took out twelve stretcher squads and brought in twenty-four wounded men." He was twice mentioned in despatches.

Minns died in hospital at Newmarket, Suffolk on 6 April 1921, aged 30, following a motor accident. He is buried in Thetford Cemetery. He was unmarried.
