= Henry Hodgson (British Army officer) =

Major-General Sir Henry Hodgson KCMG CB CVO
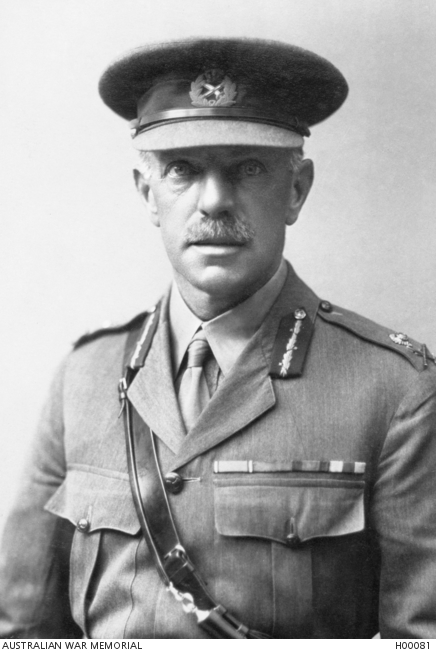
- Born: 29 June 1868; Clapham
- Died: 5 February 1930 (aged 61); London
- Burial place: Bolney
- Military career
- Allegiance: United Kingdom
- Branch: British Army
- Service years: 1886–1927
- Rank: Major-General
- Commands: 15th (The King's) Hussars; Eastern Mounted Brigade; 3rd Dismounted Brigade; Western Frontier Force; Australian Mounted Division; 44th (Home Counties) Division
- Conflicts: First World War: Gallipoli campaign; Senussi campaign; Sinai and Palestine campaign
- Awards: Knight Commander of the Order of St Michael and St George; Companion of the Order of the Bath; Commander of the Royal Victorian Order; Order of the Nile (Egypt); Military Order of Savoy (Italy)

Major-General Sir Henry West Hodgson KCMG CB CVO (29 June 1868 – 5 February 1930) was an officer of the British Army.

He was the Regimental Colonel of the 14th King's Hussars and the commanding officer of the 15th (The King's) Hussars. He also commanded the Australian Mounted Division during the Sinai and Palestine Campaign of the First World War.

== Early life ==
Henry West Hodgson was born 29 June 1868 the second son of Barnard Beckett Hodgson. His elder brother Barnard Thornton Hodgson was a barrister, Justice of the Peace and became a lieutenant-colonel 4th Battalion, Royal Sussex Regiment.

== Early military career ==
Hodgson joined the 15th (The King's) Hussars a cavalry regiment of the British Army in 1889. He was promoted to lieutenant in March 1891, captain in 1895 and became adjutant of his regiment in December 1893. He was next promoted to major on 29 November 1899, and later, after being promoted to lieutenant colonel, succeeded Colonel William Peyton as the commanding officer of the 15th Hussars in October 1907.

He was appointed to the Royal Victorian Order on 5 November 1910. Following his service as CO Hodgson was placed on the half-pay list on 10 October 1911 and made a colonel with effect from the same date. In April 1912 he took command of a mounted brigade of the Territorial Force.

== First World War ==
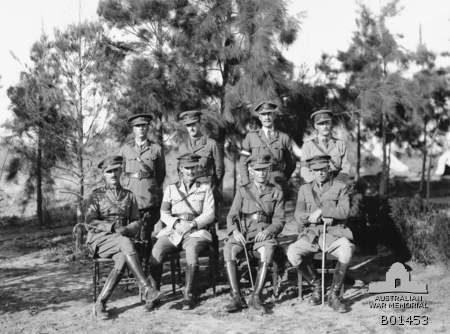
Senior officers of the Palestine campaign, 1918. Sat on the extreme right is Major General Henry W. Hodgson, GOC Australian Mounted Division.

By the time the First World War began in August 1914 Hodgson, made a temporary brigadier general on 5 August, was in command of the Eastern Mounted Brigade and deployed with them to serve in the Gallipoli campaign, where following losses it was amalgamated into the 3rd Dismounted Brigade, on 22 February 1916, along with the remnants of the South Eastern Mounted Brigade. this new brigade was still commanded by Hodgson, who was allowed to keep his temporary brigadier's rank.

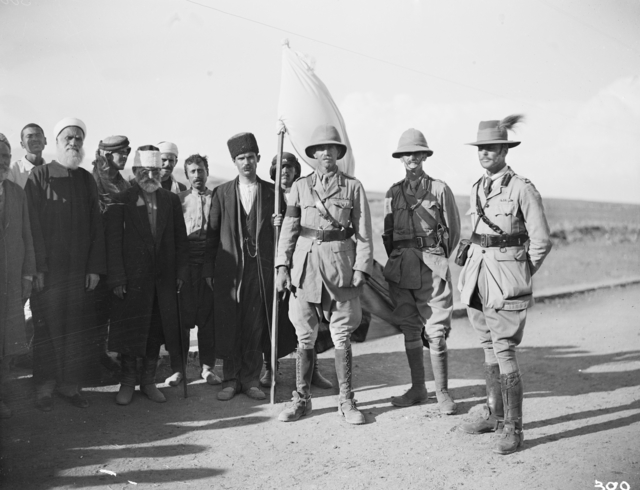
A group (including Brigadier General Grant, 4th Brigade, on the right), taken at Kuneitra, after the surrender of the town to Major General Hodgson, commander of the Australian Mounted Division (left), on 28 September 1918.

Following the Allied withdrawal he went to Egypt and fought with the Western Frontier Force in the Senussi campaign. In February 1917, he was given his first divisional command, the Imperial Mounted Division, later renamed the Australian Mounted Division. His immediate commander General Harry Chauvel said of him "his masterpiece was probably his skilful withdrawal of his own division and attached brigades from Es Salt during the second Trans-Jordan raid, when, owing to the defection of certain of our Arab allies and a determined counter-attack by the enemy, he was surrounded on three sides, and his line of retreat almost cut off in extremely difficult country. His coolness and determination on that occasion, coupled with the bravery of his troops, saved Australia very serious losses, and earned him the complete confidence of his troops".

== Post-war and final years ==
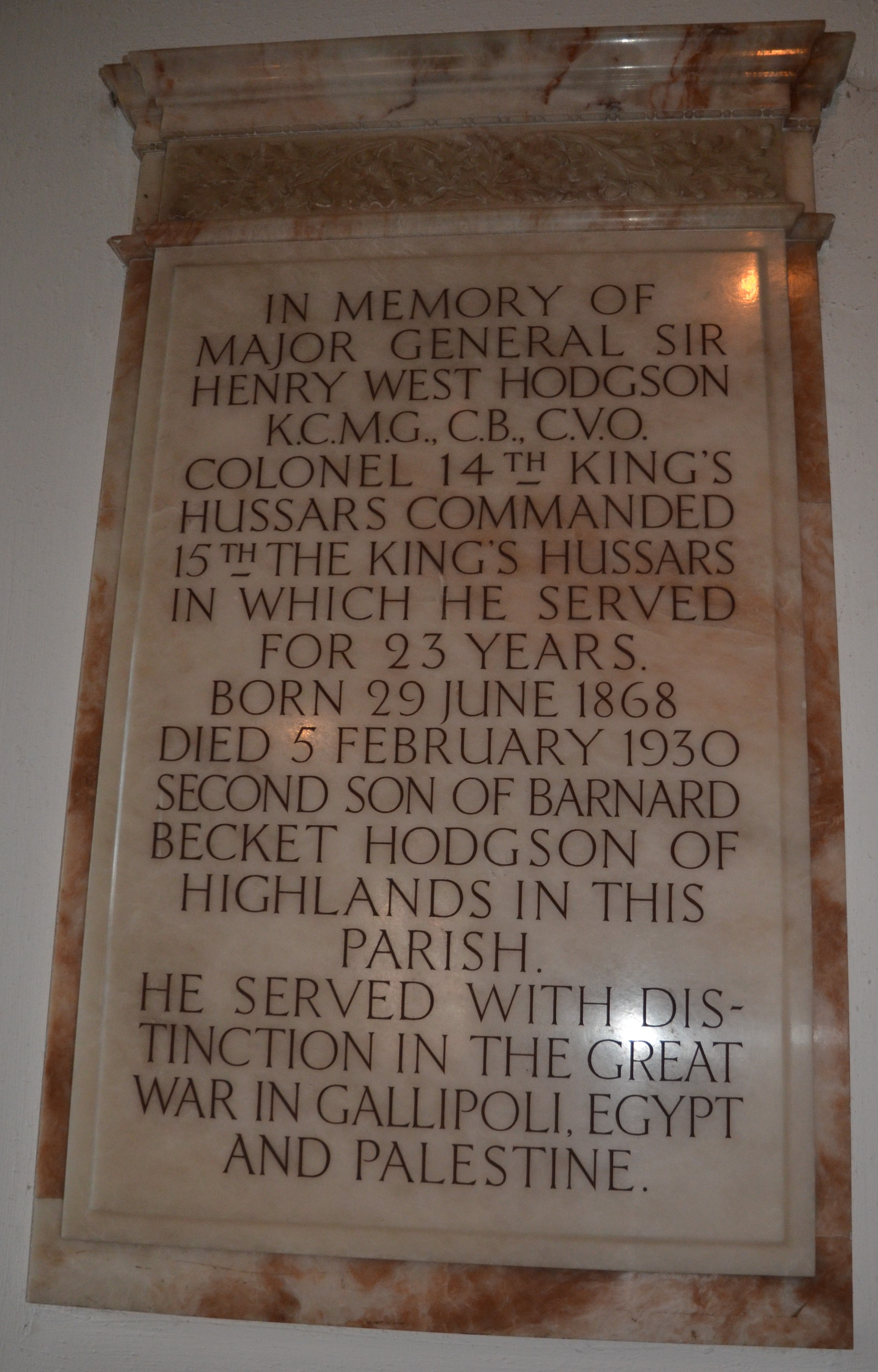
Memorial to Henry Hodgson in St Mary Magdalene's Church, Bolney, West Sussex

Hodgson was promoted to substantive major-general on 1 January 1919, having only been a substantive colonel and a temporary major-general beforehand. For his service in the Middle East he was awarded the Order of the Nile (Second Class) in November 1919, by the Sultan of Egypt, and the Military Order of Savoy by Italy.

In June 1920 he became the colonel of the 14th King's Hussars, overseeing the amalgamation with the 20th Hussars when they became the 14th/20th King's Hussars. His last command came in June 1923 when he succeeded Major General Sir John Longley as GOC of the 44th (Home Counties) Division, a Territorial Army formation, before retiring from the army in 1927.

Henry West Hodgson died at the age of 61 in London on 5 February 1930, and was buried at St Mary Magdalene's Church, Bolney, England.

== Footnotes ==
Military offices
Preceded by Sir John Longley	GOC 44th (Home Counties) Division; 1923–1927	Succeeded by Arthur Wauchope
