= Suffolk Yeomanry =

Duke of York's Own Loyal Suffolk Hussars
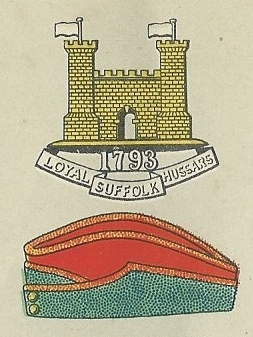
- Loyal Suffolk Hussars badge and service cap
- Active: 1793–present
- Country: Kingdom of Great Britain (1793–1800); United Kingdom (1801–present)
- Branch: Territorial Army
- Type: Yeomanry
- Size: Regiment
- Part of: Cavalry (First World War); Royal Artillery (Second World War); Army Air Corps (Present)
- Motto: CONSTANTIA LEVANDI (Steadfast in support)
- Battle honours: The Great War: Somme 1918, Bapaume 1918, Hindenberg Line, Epehy, Pursuit to Mons, France & Flanders 1918, Gallipoli 1915, Egypt 1915-17, Gaza, Jerusalem, Tell ‘Asur, Palestine 1917-18

Commanders
- Notable commanders: Brigadier-General Ned Baird

The Duke of York's Own Loyal Suffolk Hussars was a Yeomanry regiment of the British Army. Originally formed as a volunteer cavalry force in 1793, it fought in the Second Boer War as part of the Imperial Yeomanry. In World War I the regiment fought at Gallipoli, in Palestine and on the Western Front. The unit was subsequently converted into a Royal Artillery unit, serving in the anti-tank role North Africa, Italy and France during World War II. The lineage is maintained by No. 677 (Suffolk and Norfolk Yeomanry) Squadron AAC.

== French Revolutionary and Napoleonic Wars ==
After Britain was drawn into the French Revolutionary Wars, a number of independent cavalry troops were raised in the county of Suffolk from August 1793. The following year, the government of Prime Minister William Pitt the Younger proposed that the counties should form corps of Yeomanry Cavalry that could be called on by the King to defend the country against invasion or by the Lord Lieutenant to subdue any civil disorder within the county, and the Suffolk troops were accepted as Yeomanry. These troops were at Bury St Edmunds, Eye (known as the Suffolk and Norfolk Borderers, or as the Suffolk and Norfolk Borderers), Ipswich, Botesdale, Ickworth, Fornham, Lowestoft, Saxmundham and Stowmarket. Some of the troops were disbanded in 1800 and six of the remainder were regimented as the 1st Regiment of Loyal Suffolk Yeomanry Cavalry.

== 19th century ==
The regiment was formally disbanded in 1827 but revived in 1831 as the Suffolk (1st Loyal Suffolk) Troop of Yeomanry Cavalry, trained as lancers. In 1868, the 1st Suffolk was amalgamated with another independent troop at Long Melford to form the West Suffolk Regiment of Yeomanry Cavalry. It was converted to Hussars in 1872, dropped the 'West' prefix in 1875, and assumed the supplementary title of 'Loyal Suffolk Hussars' in 1883. Finally, it received the title of Suffolk Yeomanry Cavalry (The Duke of York's Own Loyal Suffolk Hussars) when the Duke of York (later King George V) became its Honorary Colonel in 1894.

Captain Richard Colvin raised a new troop of the regiment in the neighbouring county of Essex in 1889. By 1899 the regimental headquarters (RHQ) was at King's Road drill hall, Bury St Edmunds, and the regiment together with the Hertfordshire Yeomanry constituted the 7th Yeomanry Brigade.

== Imperial Yeomanry ==
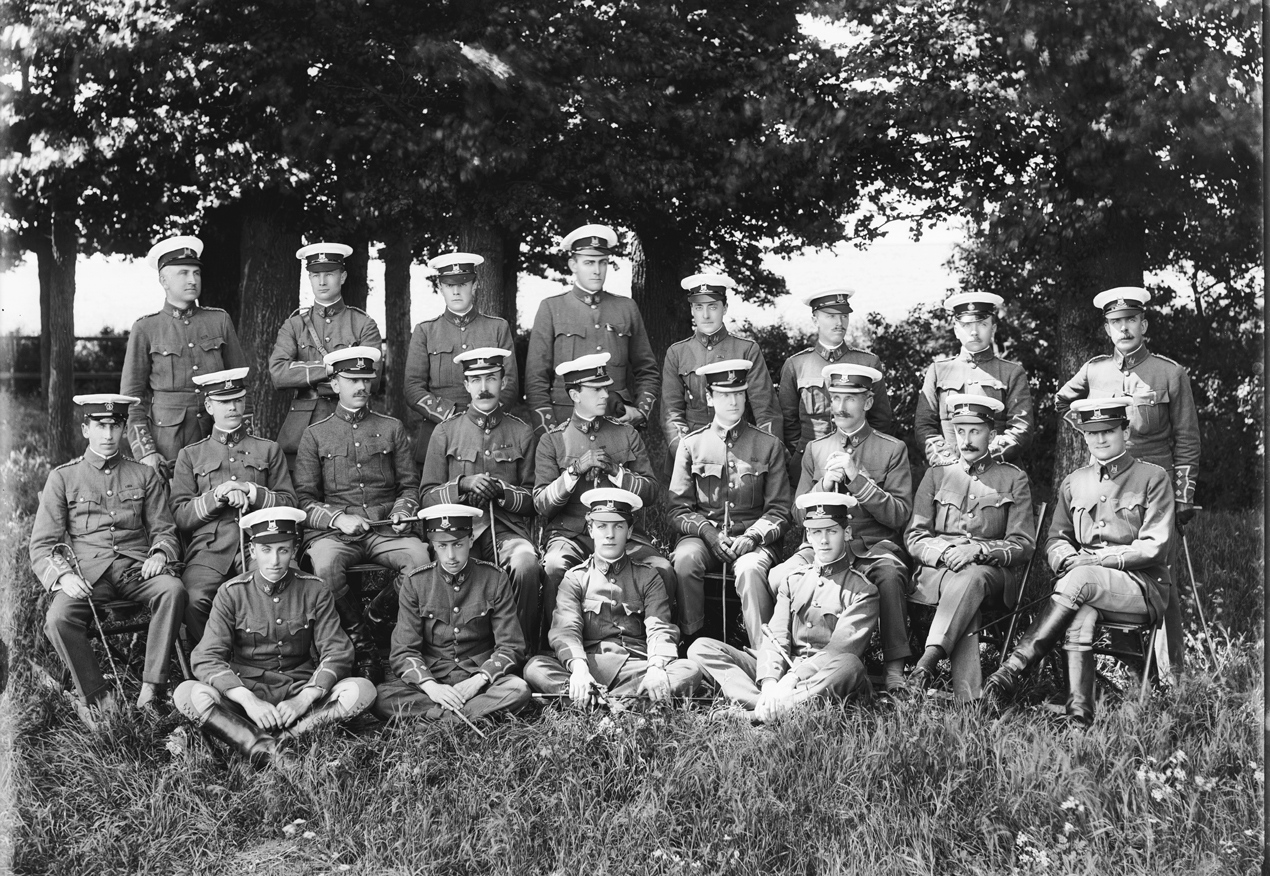
Group portrait of the Suffolk Yeomanry

Following a string of defeats during Black Week in early December 1899, the British government realised that it would need more troops than just the regular army to fight the Second Boer War. On 13 December, the decision to allow volunteer forces to serve in South Africa was made, and a Royal Warrant was issued on 24 December. This officially created the Imperial Yeomanry (IY). The force was organised as county service companies of approximately 115 men signed up for one year, and volunteers from the Yeomanry and civilians (usually middle and upper class) quickly filled the new force, which was equipped to operate as mounted infantry. The Loyal Suffolk Hussars raised the 43rd and 44th (Suffolk) companies. A company of the Loyal Suffolk Hussars first left Southampton on 31 January 1900, bound for Cape Town. These two companies, which landed in South Africa on 23 February and 28 March respectively, served in 12th Battalion, IY. In addition, Capt (now Lt-Col) Colvin of the Essex Troop commanded the 20th (Rough Riders) Battalion IY, which was raised on 17 March 1900 in the City of London and landed in South Africa on 3 May.

In May and June, the 12th Bn IY was serving as Corps Troops with Lord Roberts' main army north of the Orange River. The first contingent of the Imperial Yeomanry completed their year's term of service in 1901, the two Suffolk companies having earned the regiment its first battle honour: South Africa 1900–01.

The Imperial Yeomanry were trained and equipped as mounted infantry. The concept was considered a success, and before the war ended the existing Yeomanry regiments at home were converted into Imperial Yeomanry, with an establishment of HQ and four squadrons with a machine gun section. This included the Loyal Suffolk Hussars. A new regiment of Essex Yeomanry was also formed on the basis of the Suffolk Hussars' Essex Troop, and commanded by Lt-Col Colvin.

== World War I ==
=== Mobilisation ===
At the start of the First World War, 'A' squadron was at Cambridge, 'B' squadron and 'HQ' was at Bury St Edmunds, 'C' squadron was at Ipswich and 'D' squadron was at Beccles.

In accordance with the Territorial and Reserve Forces Act 1907 (7 Edw. 7, c.9) which brought the Territorial Force into being, the TF was intended to be a home defence force for service during wartime and members could not be compelled to serve outside the country. However, on the outbreak of war on 4 August 1914, many members volunteered for Imperial Service. Therefore, TF units were split in August and September 1914 into 1st Line (liable for overseas service) and 2nd Line (home service for those unable or unwilling to serve overseas) units. Later, a 3rd Line was formed to act as a reserve, providing trained replacements for the 1st and 2nd Line regiments.

As of August 1914, two local MPs were serving as officers: Frank Goldsmith and Walter Guinness.

=== 1/1st Duke of Yorks Own Loyal Suffolk Hussars ===
The 1/1st was embodied in August 1914 at Bury St. Edmunds and became part of the Eastern Mounted Brigade, 1st Mounted Division.

In September 1915, they were dismounted and moved to the ANZAC bridgehead at Gallipoli and came under the command of the 54th (East Anglian) Division. After they were withdrawn from Gallipoli they moved to Egypt in December 1915, the first party being evacuated to Mudros on 14 December and the rest following five days later. They were next attached to the 3rd Dismounted Brigade on Suez Canal defences, from 22 February 1916.

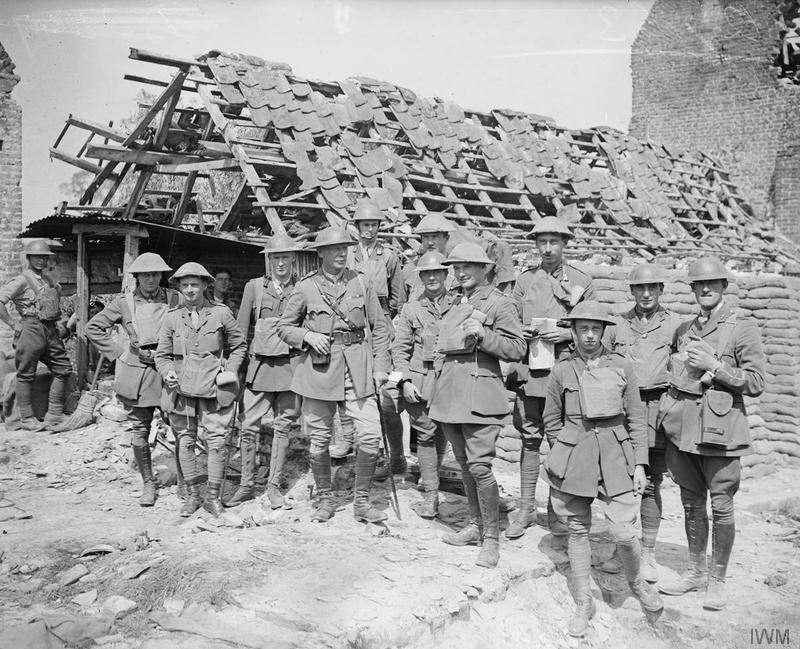
Headquarters officers of the 15th (Suffolk Yeomanry) Battalion, Suffolk Regiment, 74th (Yeomanry) Division. Near Carvin 14 August 1918. The battalion was formerly known as the 1/1st Duke of Yorks Own Loyal Suffolk Hussars.

In January 1917, they were converted to an infantry battalion and formed the 15th (Suffolk Yeomanry) Battalion, the Suffolk Regiment in the 74th (Yeomanry) Division, which moved to France in May 1918.

=== 2/1st Duke of Yorks Owns Loyal Suffolk Hussars ===
The 2nd Line regiment was formed in 1914 and by January 1915 it was in the 2/1st Eastern Mounted Brigade at Ely. On 31 March 1916, the remaining Mounted Brigades were ordered to be numbered in a single sequence; the brigade was numbered as 13th Mounted Brigade and joined 4th Mounted Division in the Wivenhoe area.

In July 1916, the regiment was converted to a cyclist unit in 5th Cyclist Brigade, 2nd Cyclist Division, still in the Wivenhoe area. In November 1916, the division was broken up and the regiment was merged with the 2/1st Norfolk Yeomanry to form the 7th (Suffolk and Norfolk) Yeomanry Cyclist Regiment in 3rd Cyclist Brigade, in the Ipswich area. In March 1917 it resumed its identity as 2/1st Suffolk Yeomanry, still at Ipswich in 3rd Cyclist Brigade. By July 1917 the regiment had moved to Woodbridge. In May 1918 the regiment moved to Ireland and was stationed at Boyle and Collooney, still in 3rd Cyclist Brigade, until the end of the war.

=== 3/1st Duke of Yorks Own Loyal Sufolk Hussars ===
The 3rd Line regiment was formed in 1915 and in the summer it was affiliated to a Reserve Cavalry Regiment in Eastern Command. In 1916 it was dismounted and attached to the 3rd Line Groups of the East Anglian Division at Halton Park, Tring. Early in 1917 the regiment was disbanded and its personnel were transferred to the 2nd Line regiment and the 4th (Reserve) Battalion of the Suffolk Regiment at Halton Park.

== Interwar years ==
On 31 January 1920, the War Office announced that recruitment for the reconstituted Territorial Army (as it was now known) would begin, but that only 16 out of the 55 existing Yeomanry regiments would be retained in their traditional mounted role. The remainder were converted to other roles, and the Suffolk Yeomanry provided two batteries in 103rd (Suffolk) Brigade, Royal Field Artillery (RFA). However, in 1923 the two Suffolk Yeomanry batteries transferred to the 108th (Norfolk Yeomanry) Brigade, and after the RFA was merged into the Royal Artillery (RA) in 1924, the unit was constituted as follows:

108th (Suffolk and Norfolk Yeomanry) Field Brigade, RA

- HQ at Swaffham
- 411 (Suffolk Yeomanry) Bty at Old Barracks, Bury St Edmunds
- 412 (Suffolk Yeomanry) Bty at Beccles, later at the Drill Hall, St Peter's Street, Lowestoft
- 429 (Norfolk Yeomanry) Bty at Swaffham, later at Cattle Market Barracks, Norwich
- 430 (Norfolk Yeomanry) Bty (Howitzer) at Swaffham

The unit was an 'Army' field brigade in 54th (East Anglian) Divisional Area.

In 1938 the RA was reorganised, 'brigades' became 'regiments', and some field regiments were converted to the anti-tank (A/T) role. 108th Field Brigade became 55th (Suffolk and Norfolk Yeomanry) Anti-Tank Regiment, RA and the batteries were renumbered 217–220. The unit became the divisional A/T regiment of 54th (East Anglian) Division.

== World War II ==
=== Mobilisation ===
By 1939 it became clear that a new European war was likely to break out and, as a direct result of the German invasion of Czechoslovakia on 15 March, the doubling of the Territorial Army was authorised, with each unit and formation forming a duplicate. When the TA was mobilised on 1 September, the Norfolk and Suffolk Yeomanry 'Duplicate and Original Regiments' were on annual training at Chiseldon Camp in Wiltshire, and the 'Norfolk Duplicate Batteries' and 'Lowestoft Contingent' returned to Swaffham. The following day, orders were issued to split the unit into 55th (Suffolk Yeomanry) A/T Rgt at Bury St Edmunds as part of 54th Division, and 65th (Norfolk Yeomanry) A/T Rgt at Swaffham as part of the duplicate 18th Infantry Division. The Suffolk Yeomanry part was organised as follows: (Note: The War Diary is an authoritative source and contradicts the statement by Mileham (pp. 101, 112) that the Suffolk and Norfolk batteries were not split until 1942 and the statement by Litchfield that the 65th did not regain its Norfolk Yeomanry title until that year.)

=== 55th (Suffolk Yeomanry) Anti-Tank Regiment ===
- HQ at Bury St Edmunds
- 217 Bty at Bury St Edmunds
- 218 Bty at Lowestoft
- 219 Bty at Bury St Edmunds and Brandon
- 220 Bty at Beccles

The Regiment was attached to various Divisions during the war:

54th (East Anglian) Infantry Division, September 1939
79th Armoured Division, September 1942 – April 1943
49th (West Riding) Infantry Division, July 1943 – August 1945

From July 1943 until after the end of the war, the regiment served with the 49th (West Riding) Division and fought in the North-Western Europe from June 1944 to May 1945.

== Postwar ==
After the war, the regiment was reconstituted as 308th (Suffolk Yeomanry) Anti-Tank Regiment, RA with headquarters at Bury St Edmunds. It amalgamated with 358th (Suffolk) Medium Regiment, RA, to form 358th (Suffolk Yeomanry) Medium Regiment, RA in 1958 and it amalgamated with 284th (King's Own Royal Regiment, Norfolk Yeomanry) Light Anti-Aircraft Regiment, RA to form 308th (Suffolk and Norfolk Yeomanry) Field Regiment, RA in 1961.

During the major reorganisation of the Territorial Army that took place in 1967, the unit was reduced to battery size as 202 (The Suffolk and Norfolk Yeomanry) Battery, RA, part of 100 (Medium) Regiment Royal Artillery (Volunteers). The battery, which had been equipped with the 105mm light gun, re-roled as an air defence unit and transferred to 106th (Yeomanry) Regiment Royal Artillery in July 1999. It re-roled again and became No. 677 (Suffolk and Norfolk Yeomanry) Squadron AAC, part of 6 Regiment Army Air Corps in July 2006. Squadron Headquarters and A Flight are at Bury St Edmunds, B Flight at Norwich and C Flight at Ipswich.

== Uniforms and insignia ==
A county meeting at Stowmarket on 28 May 1794 decided that the uniform for the troops of Yeomanry Cavalry being raised in Suffolk would be 'a dark blue coat faced with yellow, cape [collar] and cuffs, yellow shoulder-straps white waistcoat, leather breeches, high topt [sic] boots, round hat, white feather and cockade, white [metal] buttons, with the letters S.Y. (Suffolk Yeomanry)'. However, the Yeomanry did not approve of the pattern and another meeting on 12 June ordered a uniform of 'Scarlet coat, lined white, with dark blue military cape and cuffs, scarlet and blue chain epaulets, white waistcoat, leather breeches, high topt boots, round hat, with bearskin, feather and cockade, white plated button, with the Crown and Garter of the Order, the words "Loyal Suffolk Yeomanry" inscribed on the Garter'. A great-coat of dark blue, lined white, with uniform buttons was also prescribed. The first troop raised was to bear 'No. 1' on the button and the other troops similarly numbered in order of acceptance by the Lord-lieutenant.

Until 1868 the several independent troops that made up The Loyal Suffolk Hussars wore a variety of cavalry uniforms. In 1850 these included green with gold lace for the 1st Loyal Suffolk Troop; a scarlet light dragoon dress for the Suffolk Borderers; and a dark green lancer uniform for the Long Melford Troop. Brought together as the Suffolk Yeomanry Cavalry in 1868, the amalgamated regiment adopted a heavy dragoon dress of green with red facings with a brass Albert helmet and white plume. In 1878 fashion changes had led to a green hussar uniform with braided dolman and fur busby. The hussar dress was changed to blue-green in the 1880s. By 1902 a special levee-dress jacket had been authorised for officers, modelled on that of the Royal Horse Artillery but in green and red. By the 1911 Coronation, other ranks were wearing a "mid-bright green" tunic and overalls (tight cavalry breeches) with red facings. Officers, however, retained the levee-dress which was variously described as "lavish" and "magnificent".

After 1914, the standard khaki service and (subsequently battledress) became normal wear, although the combination of green and red survived in items such as the officers' field service cap.

Until the 1961 amalgamation, the Suffolk Yeomanry batteries of the RA continued to wear the Loyal Suffolk Hussars cap badge (in gilt or bronze for officers, bimetal for other ranks). During World War II the officers wore the badge embroidered on their side caps.

== Battle honours ==
The Suffolk Yeomanry has been awarded the following battle honours:

Second Boer War

South Africa 1900–01

First World War

Somme 1918, Bapaume 1918, Hindenburg Line, Épéhy, Pursuit to Mons, France and Flanders 1918, Gallipoli 1915, Egypt 1915–17, Gaza, Jerusalem, Tell 'Asur, Palestine 1917–18

Second World War

None awarded to artillery. The Royal Artillery was present in nearly all battles and would have earned most of the honours awarded to cavalry and infantry regiments. In 1833, William IV awarded the motto Ubique (meaning "everywhere") in place of all battle honours.

== Commanders ==
Lieutenants-Colonel Commandant

- Lieutenant-Colonel Alfred George Lucas (until 1900)
- Honorary Colonel Fletcher H. G. Cruickshank (14 March 1900–)

== Prominent members ==
- The Hon. Francis Crossley (later 2nd Baron Somerleyton) and his brother, the Hon. John De Bathe Crossley, served as Major and Captain respectively in the Suffolk Yeomanry batteries in the 1920s.
- Arthur Guinness, Viscount Elveden (heir of the Earl of Iveagh) was commissioned into 411 Bty as a 2nd Lieutenant in 1932, and was killed on active service as a Major with 55th (Suffolk Yeomanry) A/T Rgt in Holland in February 1945.
- Sir Charles Rowley, 6th Baronet, formerly an officer in the Grenadier Guards, commanded 411 Bty from 1925 and became CO of 108th Fd Rgt in 1935.
- The Hon. John Hare, (later 1st Viscount Blakenham) was commissioned into RHQ as a 2nd Lieutenant in 1938, and served with 55th (Suffolk Yeomanry) A/T Rgt during World War II.

== See also ==
- Imperial Yeomanry
- List of Yeomanry Regiments 1908
- Yeomanry
- Yeomanry order of precedence
- British yeomanry during the First World War
- Second line yeomanry regiments of the British Army
- List of British Army Yeomanry Regiments converted to Royal Artillery

== Bibliography ==
- L.S. Amery (ed), The Times History of the War in South Africa 1899-1902, London: Sampson Low, Marston, 6 Vols 1900–09; Appendix to Chapters I-XIV, pp. 503–14.
- Anon, Regimental Badges and Service Caps, London: George Philip & Sons, 1941.
- Burke's Peerage, Baronetage and Knightage, 100th Edn, London, 1953.
- Col John K. Dunlop, The Development of the British Army 1899–1914, London: Methuen, 1938.
- Col S.P. Foakes & Maj M. McKenzie-Bell (eds), Essex Yeomanry: A Short History, Essex: Temperley Media/Essex Yeomanry Association, d, ISBN 978-0-9572333-0-0.
- James, Brigadier E.A. (1978). British Regiments 1914–18. London: Samson Books Limited. ISBN 0-906304-03-2.
- Joslen, H. F. (2003) [1960]. Orders of Battle: Second World War, 1939–1945. Uckfield, East Sussex: Naval and Military Press. ISBN 978-1-84342-474-1.
- Norman E.H. Litchfield, The Territorial Artillery 1908–1988 (Their Lineage, Uniforms and Badges), Nottingham: Sherwood Press, 1992, ISBN 0-9508205-2-0.
- N.B. Leslie, Battle Honours of the British and Indian Armies 1695–1914, London: Leo Cooper, 1970, ISBN 0-85052-004-5.
- Mileham, Patrick (1994). The Yeomanry Regiments; 200 Years of Tradition. Edinburgh: Canongate Academic. ISBN 1-898410-36-4.
- Rinaldi, Richard A (2008). Order of Battle of the British Army 1914. Ravi Rikhye. ISBN 978-0-97760728-0.
- Col H.C.B. Rogers, The Mounted Troops of the British Army 1066–1945, London: Seeley Service, 1959.
- Lt-Col J.D. Sainsbury, The Hertfordshire Yeomanry Regiments, Royal Artillery, Part 1: The Field Regiments 1920-1946, Welwyn: Hertfordshire Yeomanry and Artillery Trust/Hart Books, 1999, ISBN 0-948527-05-6.
- Edward M. Spiers, The Army and Society 1815–1914, London: Longmans, 1980, ISBN 0-582-48565-7.
- Titles and Designations of Formations and Units of the Territorial Army, London: War Office, 7 November 1927 (RA sections also summarised in Litchfield, Appendix IV).
- Wilson, Derek A. (1998). Dark and Light: The Story of the Guinness Family. London: Weidenfeld & Nicolson. ISBN 0-297-81718-3.
