= Norfolk Yeomanry =

British Territorial Volunteer Yeomanry regiment

Norfolk Yeomanry (The King's Own Royal Regiment) 65th (Norfolk Yeomanry) Anti-Tank Regiment, RA
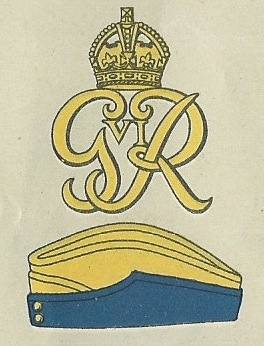
- Badge with the royal cypher of George VI and service cap as worn at the outbreak of the Second World War
- Active: 1794 – present
- Country: Kingdom of Great Britain (1794–1800); United Kingdom (1801–Present)
- Branch: British Army
- Type: Yeomanry; Artillery
- Size: Regiment
- Garrison/HQ: Norwich; Swaffham
- Engagements: First World War; Second World War

The Norfolk Yeomanry was a volunteer cavalry (Yeomanry) regiment of Britain's Territorial Army, accepted onto the establishment of the British Army in 1794. After seeing action in the Second Boer War, it served dismounted at Gallipoli, in Palestine and on the Western Front during the First World War. Between the wars it converted to the Royal Artillery (TA), and served as an anti-tank regiment in France, the Western Desert, Italy and North West Europe during the Second World War. After the war it served as a TA air defence unit and then as an Army Air Corps unit.

== History ==
=== Formation and early history ===
A volunteer unit, the Norfolk Rangers, was raised as a home defence force in the county of Norfolk in 1782, during the American Revolutionary War, by the Hon George Townshend. Lord Ferrers of Chartley (later 2nd Marquess Townshend). It consisted of a troop of cavalry and an infantry company. The unit was accepted as Yeomanry Cavalry in 1794, and during the Napoleonic Wars there were three regiments, the 1st West Norfolk, 2nd Mid Norfolk, and 3rd East Norfolk. Along with many other Yeomanry regiments, these were disbanded in 1828. A revived Norfolk Yeomanry Cavalry was formed in 1831 but disbanded in 1849.

=== Second Boer War ===
The success of the Imperial Yeomanry, raised as volunteer mounted infantry during the Second Boer War, led to a number of new regiments joining the order of battle of the traditional yeomanry cavalry regiments in 1901. Among these was the Norfolk Imperial Yeomanry (King's Own), raised at the express wish of the newly crowned King Edward VII (who lived at Sandringham House in Norfolk). The regiment took the Royal cypher as its badge. The cadre for the new unit was provided by the Norfolk squadron of the Suffolk Yeomanry (the Duke of York's Own Loyal Suffolk Hussars), and it formed four squadrons and a machine gun section.

=== Territorial Force ===
When the Yeomanry were subsumed into the new Territorial Force (TF) under the Haldane Reforms of 1908, the regiment was renamed the Norfolk Yeomanry (King's Own Royal Regiment) (Dragoons) and was distributed as follows:

- Regimental HQ at Cattle Market Street, Norwich
- A Squadron HQ at Norwich, drill stations at Attleborough, Long Stratton, Loddon, Diss and Harleston
- B Squadron HQ at North Walsham, drill stations at Brandiston, Blofield, Coltishall, Cromer, Hanworth, Holt, Marsham, Reepham, Stalham and Great Yarmouth
- C Squadron HQ at Fakenham, drill stations at Barwick, Bircham, Brisley, Dersingham, East Dereham, Fransham, Hardingham, Hunstanton, Massingham, Quarles, Summerfield, Swaffham, Watton, Wells, Wymondham and Walsingham
- D Squadron HQ at King's Lynn, drill stations at Downham Market, Thetford and Wisbech.

It formed part of the Eastern Mounted Brigade.

=== First World War ===
==== Mobilisation ====
In accordance with the Territorial and Reserve Forces Act 1907 (7 Edw. 7, c.9) which brought the Territorial Force into being, the TF was intended to be a home defence force for service during wartime and members could not be compelled to serve outside the country. However, on the outbreak of war on 4 August 1914, many members volunteered for Imperial Service. Therefore, TF units were split in August and September 1914 into 1st Line (liable for overseas service) and 2nd Line (home service for those unable or unwilling to serve overseas) units. Later, a 3rd Line was formed to act as a reserve, providing trained replacements for the 1st and 2nd Line regiments.

==== 1/1st Norfolk Yeomanry ====
On the outbreak of war in August 1914 the Eastern Mounted Brigade became part of the 1st Mounted Division and served with it in coastal defence at Woodbridge, Suffolk, until September 1915, when it was sent to reinforce the Allied force at Gallipoli.

===== Gallipoli =====
The Eastern Mounted Brigade left 1st Mounted Division and embarked without their horses at Liverpool on the RMS Olympic, sailing on 25 September 1915 for Lemnos.The Norfolk Yeomanry, with 25 officers & 504 men, were under the command of Lt-Col A. F. Morse. Having arrived at Mudros harbour on 1 October, the brigade had to remain on board until 8 October, when the Norfolk and Suffolk Yeomanry transhipped to the Abassieh, but bad weather prevented them from landing at ANZAC Cove until 10 October.

On arrival the brigade was attached to the 54th (East Anglian) Division, with the Norfolk Yeomanry joining the 1/8th Hampshire Regiment and the 1/4th Essex Regiment on 14 October for instruction in trench warfare in the Hill 60 area. After a week they relieved the 1/6th Essex and took over the Norfolk Street sector until they were relieved in turn by the 1/4th Norfolk Regiment and returned to the New Bedford Road rest camp on 26 October. Throughout November the regiment took turns in the trenches to the right of Hill 60, suffering a trickle of casualties. By the end of the month casualties amounted to 200 out of 500 other ranks, mostly from sickness.

The decision having been made to abandon the campaign, the first party of the Norfolk Yeomanry was evacuated to Mudros on 14 December, the remainder following five days later, these detachments being among the last to be evacuated from the Suvla beachhead on 20 December.

===== Egypt and Palestine =====
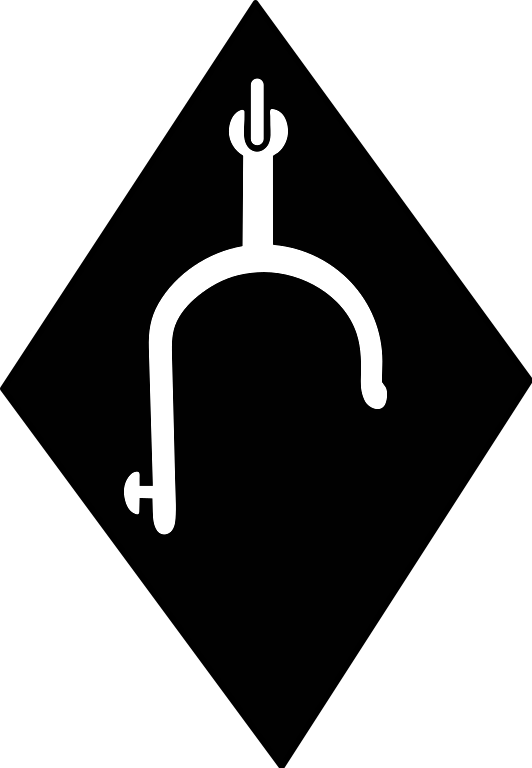
The "Broken Spur" insignia of the 74th (Yeomanry) Division

The regiment landed in Egypt in February 1916, where the South-Eastern and Eastern Mounted Brigades were merged to form the 3rd Dismounted Brigade and were engaged on digging defences for the Suez Canal. In July they were moved to Sollum and Mersa Matruh on the Egyptian coast as part of the Western Frontier Force defending Egypt against the Senussi. In early 1917 the dismounted brigades were moved from Western Egypt and organised into 74th (Yeomanry) Division, with the Norfolk Yeomanry being redesigned from 7 February as the 12th (Norfolk Yeomanry) Battalion, Norfolk Regiment in 230th Infantry Brigade. The 12th Norfolks went into the trenches at Deir el Balah on 12 April in preparation for the advance into Palestine. The 74th Division remained in reserve during the Second Battle of Gaza (17–19 April), and afterwards 230th Bde held the line of Wadi Ghuzzee during May before moving into divisional reserve in June.

The 74th Division began a period of intense infantry training in August. The Third Battle of Gaza opened on the night of 30 October with the Yeomanry taking up positions on the far side of Wadi Ghuzzee. 230th Brigade supported the attack at 08.30, the Norfolks on the left. All the battalions came under shrapnel fire and progress through the gullies was slow. The brigade came within 1000 yards of the Turkish position by 10.40, by which time the men were crawling beneath machine-gun fire. But covered by their own artillery and machine-gun barrage, they cleared the opposing trenches soon after 12.15. The Yeomanry began consolidating the position, but were still under long-range fire from the next Turkish position, so 230th Bde was sent forward to take this position as well. By now the objective of Beersheba had fallen to the Australian Light Horse.

The next phase of the battle, as far as 74th Division was concerned, came on 6 November, when it attacked towards the railway line. The advance had to be made over open country to the enemy position which was at least 4000 yards away, but the attack was remarkable for the speed at which the battalions advanced, taking several enemy gun positions. After the victory, the division was left to clear the battlefield, and only caught up with the rest of the army on 23 November, when it began attacking into the hill country.

The division was relieved on 4/5 December and shifted round to attack towards Jerusalem from the west. The night approach for the attack on 8 December was difficult and the troops were late in jumping off (at 05.35). They then had to descend into a steep wadi and climb the other side. The Norfolks on the left took 35 minutes to climb the slope, where they found the Turks had abandoned their trenches but were holding walls and rocks just behind the crest. The Yeomanry worked their way forward over a mile and a half of difficult country and reached the village of Beit Iksa by 11.30. Here they were held up by flanking fire from Nebi Samwil, and established an outpost line. The following morning the enemy had disappeared, and the advance was made with hardly a shot fired, while Jerusalem fell into British hands.

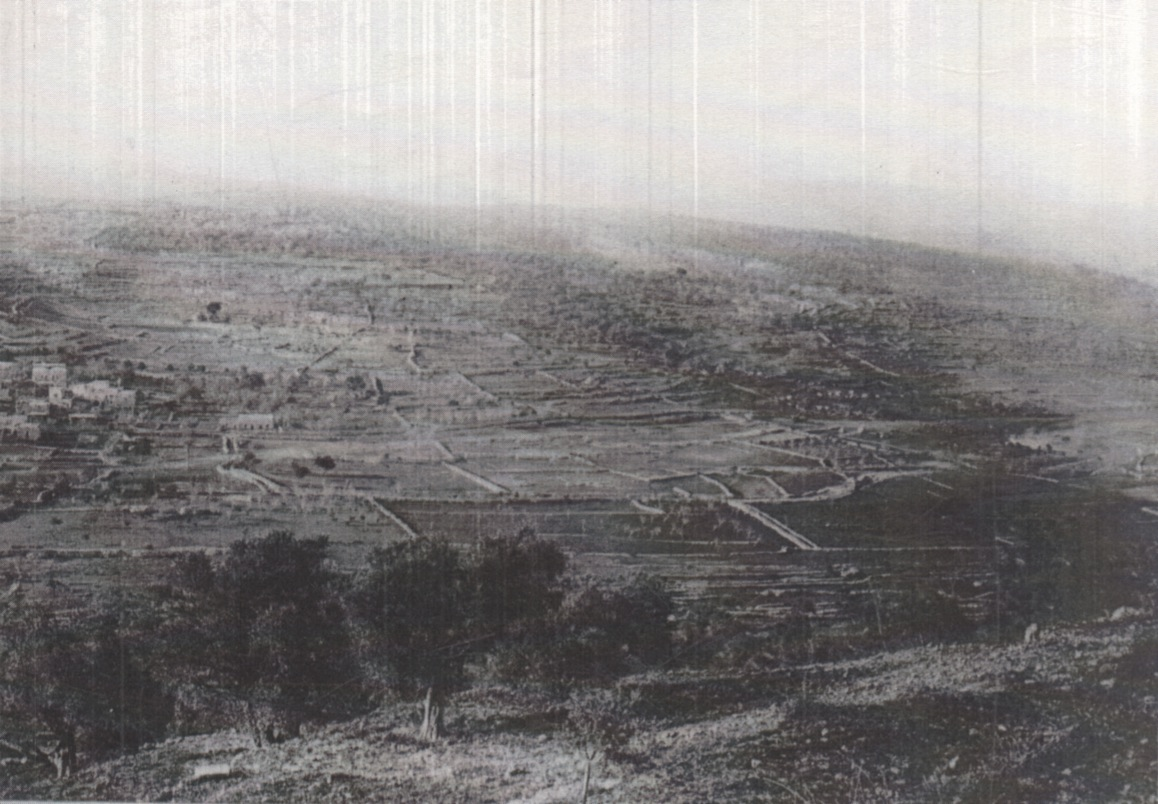
The Nablus Road, Ain Sinai and Yebrud (photo taken by 230th Bde).

The offensive was renewed between 28 and 31 December, with the brigades alternating in the lead. After the Capture of Jericho the British forces continued the advance north until 8 March 1918, when the division attacked the Tell Azur position. The 12th Norfolks were in reserve as the brigade crossed the Nablus Road and advanced over broken ground. They then took over the advance, but did not arrive until the afternoon because of the difficult approach. Their task was to scramble down a rough slope before crossing a bridge and then climbing a formidable terraced hill, beyond the crest of which lay the objective (Hill K12), and it was decided to wait until dusk. The battalion lost formation in the dark and the descent was swept with machine gun fire, but the Norfolks found a single practicable path down the slope. At midnight the climb began, with the Turks throwing grenades down on them until they reached the crest. The advance towards K12 was resumed at 06.00 on 9 March but was halted by machine gun fire and exhaustion. Supporting troops continued the advance, but it ended on 12 March and the line achieved was consolidated.

Colonel J.F. Barclay led a raid with two companies of his Norfolks on the night of 23/24 March, but the success of the German spring offensive on the Western Front meant that active operations in Palestine had to be shut down, and reinforcements sent to France.

===== France and Flanders =====
On arrival in France, the 74th Division conformed to the smaller establishment of divisions in the British Expeditionary Force, releasing three spare battalions, including the 12th Norfolks, which on 20 June were formed into 94th (Yeomanry) Brigade in the 31st Division.

The 12th Norfolks fought with 31st Division in the following actions of the Hundred Days Offensive:

- La Becque (28 June)
- Capture of Vieux Merquin (18 August)
- Fifth Battle of Ypres (28 September–2 October) [little bit in Edmonds]
- Tieghem (31 October).

==== 2/1st Norfolk Yeomanry ====
The 2nd Line regiment was formed in 1914 and by January 1915 it was in the 2/1st Eastern Mounted Brigade in the Huntingdon area. On 31 March 1916, the remaining Mounted Brigades were ordered to be numbered in a single sequence; the brigade was numbered as 13th Mounted Brigade and joined 4th Mounted Division in the Wivenhoe area.

In July 1916, the regiment was converted to a cyclist unit in 5th Cyclist Brigade, 2nd Cyclist Division, still in the Wivenhoe area. In November 1916, the division was broken up and regiment was merged with the 2/1st Suffolk Yeomanry to form 7th (Suffolk and Norfolk) Yeomanry Cyclist Regiment in 3rd Cyclist Brigade, in the Ipswich area. In March 1917 it resumed its identity as 2/1st Norfolk Yeomanry, still at Ipswich in 3rd Cyclist Brigade. By July 1917 the regiment had moved to Woodbridge. In May 1918 the regiment moved to Ireland and was stationed at Castlereagh and Gort, still in 3rd Cyclist Brigade, until the end of the war.

==== 3/1st Norfolk Yeomanry ====
The 3rd Line regiment was formed in 1915 and in the summer it was affiliated to a Reserve Cavalry Regiment in Eastern Command. In the summer of 1916 it was attached to the 3rd Line Groups of the East Anglian Division. Early in 1917 the regiment was disbanded and its personnel were transferred to the 2nd Line regiment and the 4th (Reserve) Battalion of the Norfolk Regiment at Halton Park, Tring.

=== Between the wars ===
On 31 January 1920 the War Office announced that recruitment would begin for the reconstituted Territorial Army (as it was now known), but that only 16 out of the 55 existing Yeomanry regiments would be retained in their traditional mounted role. The remainder were converted to other roles, and in 1922 the Norfolk Yeomanry became 108th (Norfolk Yeomanry) Brigade, Royal Field Artillery (RFA), with two batteries (429th and 430th) based at Swaffham. The Commanding Officer (CO) was Lieutenant-Colonel Viscount Bury, MC. The following year the regiment was joined by two Suffolk Yeomanry batteries transferred from 103rd (Suffolk) Brigade, RFA, and after the RFA was merged into the Royal Artillery (RA) in 1924 the unit was constituted as follows:

108th (Suffolk and Norfolk Yeomanry) Field Brigade, RA

- HQ at Swaffham
- 411 (Suffolk Yeomanry) Bty at Old Barracks, Bury St Edmunds
- 412 (Suffolk Yeomanry) Bty at Beccles, later at the Drill Hall, St Peter's Street, Lowestoft
- 429 (Norfolk Yeomanry) Bty at Swaffham, later at Cattle Market Barracks, Norwich
- 430 (Norfolk Yeomanry) Bty (Howitzer) at Swaffham

The unit was an 'Army' field brigade in 54th (East Anglian) Divisional Area. Lt-Col O. Birkbeck became CO on 24 October 1926, succeeded by Lt-Col B.M.M. Edwards, MC, on 24 October 1931 and by Lt-Col Sir Charles Rowley, Bt, on 24 October 1935.

In 1938 the RA was reorganised, 'brigades' became 'regiments', and some field regiments were converted to the anti-tank (A/T) role. 108th Field Brigade became 55th (Suffolk and Norfolk Yeomanry) Anti-Tank Regiment, RA and the batteries were renumbered 217–220. The unit became the divisional A/T regiment of 54th (East Anglian) Division.

=== Second World War ===
==== Mobilisation ====
By 1939, it became clear that a new European war was likely to break out and, as a direct result of the German invasion of Czechoslovakia on 15 March, the doubling of the Territorial Army was authorised, with each unit and formation forming a duplicate.

When the TA was mobilised on 1 September, the Norfolk and Suffolk Yeomanry 'Duplicate and Original Regiments' were on annual training at Chiseldon Camp in Wiltshire, and the 'Norfolk Duplicate Batteries' and 'Lowestoft Contingent' returned to Swaffham. The following day, orders were issued to split the unit into 55th (Suffolk Yeomanry) A/T Rgt at Bury St Edmunds as part of 54th Division, and 65th (Norfolk Yeomanry) A/T Rgt at Swaffham as part of the duplicate 18th Infantry Division then in process of formation. Under the command of Lt-Col W.N. Arnold, the new regiment was organised as follows:

==== 65th (Norfolk Yeomanry) Anti-Tank Regiment ====
- HQ at Swaffham
- 257 Bty at Norwich and Wymondham
- 258 Bty at Norwich
- 259 Bty at Swaffham
- 260 Bty at King's Lynn

The unit was usually abbreviated as '65 (NY) A/T Rgt' or more familiarly (especially within 7th Armoured Division) as simply the Norfolk Yeomanry. At this date the standard British Army A/T gun was the 2-pounder on a scale of 12 guns per battery.

The 'Double T' (for the Tyne and Tees rivers) insignia of 50th (Northumbrian) Division

The regiment left 18th Division in November 1939 to reinforce 50th (Northumbrian) Infantry Division, which was preparing to join the British Expeditionary Force in France. After training around Tewkesbury, the regiment embarked on the Ulster Monarch on 9 February 1940, and by the end of the month was concentrated at Crèvecœur-le-Grand.

==== Battle of France ====
When the Battle of France began on 10 May, the BEF started to advance north into Belgium in accordance with 'Plan D', but the German Army broke through the Ardennes, outflanking the BEF and forcing it to withdraw again. By 19 May the regiment was defending Vimy Ridge near Arras, with 257 Bty detached to 'Polforce' guarding the Canal Line.

===== Arras =====
On 21 May the BEF counter-attacked at Arras, striking south against the German forces cutting westwards towards the sea. Major-General G. Le Q. Martel of 50th Division attacked with two columns, each consisting of a tank regiment and an infantry battalion with artillery support. 260 Battery under Major Forrester accompanied the Right Column. The advance began at 14.30, without time for reconnaissance, but the column fought its way through Duisans successfully. Two A/T Troops and two companies of the 8th Bn Durham Light Infantry were left to hold the village and deal with the prisoners, while the column pushed on. Warlus and then Berneville were cleared, but then the advance guard ran into troops of the 7th Panzer Division and 3rd SS Panzer Division Totenkopf, came under heavy machine-gun and mortar fire, and were pushed back to the main body, which was subjected to a 20-minute attack by aircraft. This was followed by German tank attacks, which were driven off by 260 A/T Bty's guns. The divisional historian claimed that 'upwards of twenty tanks were knocked out and left burning n the ground'. Right Column could advance no further, and withdrew with French support in the evening. 2nd Lieutenant Spens distinguished himself in this action and was awarded the Military Cross (MC). 260 Battery withdrew to Givenchy, where it was badly bombed on 22 May.

===== Dunkirk =====
After the check at Arras, the German columns resumed their advance to the sea, cutting the BEF off from the bulk of French forces. The decision was made to withdraw to Dunkirk and try to evacuate the BEF from there (Operation Dynamo). Most of the regiment withdrew to Wattignies while 259 Bty remained in action on the La Bassée–Béthune Canal, where Bombardier Pointer withdrew his gun and tractor under fire and was awarded the Military Medal (MM). 50th Division was bombed all day on 25 May 258 and 260 Btys suffering such losses in manpower and equipment as they fell back through Poperinghe that they were amalgamated (as 260 Bty). The next day, while most of the regiment withdrew towards Ypres, 259 Bty was sent with 1st Bn Royal Irish Fusiliers of 25th Brigade to form a defensive line facing south on the Canal de Lawe from Lestrem to Vieille-Chapelle to cover the BEF's withdrawal.

By 29 May the Germans were closing up to the Dunkirk perimeter where the regiment acted as rearguard. The detached 259 Bty was evacuated on 29 and 30 May. The bulk of the regiment destroyed its equipment and got away in boats from Dunkirk on 31 May; 260 Bty followed on 2 June.

==== Home Defence ====
The regiment reformed at Knutsford in Cheshire, and then manned coastal defences at Bridport in Dorset, building pillboxes, laying wire entanglements and cooperating with the newly formed Local Defence Volunteers (later Home Guard). In mid-July the regiment was equipped with a collection of obsolete guns:

- RHQ at Bridport, later at Child Okeford
- 257 Bty at Burton Bradstock, later at Durweston
- 258 Bty at West Bay, later at Swanage
- 259 Bty at Chideock, with detachments manning 3-pounders at Lyme Regis and Charmouth, 4-inch at Chesilton, and 12-pounder at Fleet
- 260 Bty at Bridport with detachments manning 4-inch guns at Burton Bradstock and East Bexington
- Detachments of 63rd Medium Rgt manning four static 6-pounders

As the month progressed, ten mobile 6-pounders were issued to the regiment, and at the end of the month 257 Bty at Durweston received its first eight replacement 2-pounder A/T guns. Training and reorganisation continued through the summer under the command of Lt-Col K.W. Hervey, despite air raids and false invasion alarms. Then on 8 November the regiment was ordered to leave 50th Division and begin mobilisation for overseas service. The last of its new guns having been delivered by 1 December, the regiment proceeded to Swansea Docks and sailed for the Middle East on 18 December.

==== Western Desert ====
The regiment served in the Western Desert Campaign, joining the 7th Armoured Division ('The Desert Rats') with which it served in Italy and North West Europe until the end of the war in Europe.

=== Post war ===
When the TA was reconstituted in 1947, the regiment was reformed in the Anti-Aircraft (AA) role as 389th (The King's Own Regiment, Norfolk Yeomanry) Light Anti-Aircraft Regiment, RA, with RHQ still at Swaffham. It formed part of 98th (AA) Army Group Royal Artillery in the field army, but this was disbanded in 1948. The abolition of Anti-Aircraft Command in 1955 resulted in a large number of disbandments and mergers among TA AA units. The 389th LAA Rgt merged with 284th (1st East Anglian) (Mixed) Heavy AA Rgt, to form 284th (The King's Royal Regiment, Norfolk Yeomanry) Light Anti-Aircraft Regiment, RA, of which the old 284th formed RHQ (at Norwich) and Q Btys, and the Norfolk Yeomanry provided P and R Btys.

In 1961 this regiment in turn later merged with 358th (Suffolk Yeomanry) Field Rgt, RA becoming 308th (Suffolk and Norfolk Yeomanry) Field Regiment, RA, with RHQ moving to Ipswich. In 1967 this became 202 (The Suffolk and Norfolk Yeomanry) Battery Royal Artillery (Volunteers), a battery within the newly raised 100th (Yeomanry) Regiment Royal Artillery (Volunteers).

In 2006, 202 (The Suffolk and Norfolk Yeomanry) Battery Royal Artillery (Volunteers) re-roled to become No. 677 (Suffolk and Norfolk Yeomanry) Squadron AAC (Volunteers) and is part of 6 Regiment Army Air Corps (Volunteers). Squadron Headquarters and A Flight are at Bury St Edmunds, B Flight at Norwich and C Flight at Ipswich.

== Insignia ==
The regimental badge was the Royal Cypher, and this was retained after the conversion to Royal Artillery. Before the Second World War, the regiment wore Norfolk Yeomanry buttons, cavalry shoulder chains and yellow Gorget patches on the blue patrol jacket. Royal Artillery collar badges were worn on service dress. The officers' field service cap was canary yellow over blue. After the war, other ranks wore the Norfolk Yeomanry badge with a yellow backing on khaki berets. Combined Norfolk and Suffolk Yeomanry cap and collar badges were introduced in 1961.

== Uniforms ==
The first uniform adopted for the Norfolk Yeomanry, in 1901, was a relatively simple combination of dark blue patrol jacket, khaki helmet and khaki or dark blue breeches. Gorget patches and other facings were canary yellow. In 1905 a black leather helmet was adopted for other ranks and an enameled aluminum one for officers. After this date all ranks wore a yellow horse-hair plume for parade. With King George as Colonel-in Chief and the King of Norway as Honorary Lt-Colonel, the Norfolk Yeomanry achieved a higher public profile than most yeomanry units and a special levee-dress uniform combining both dragoon and lancer features was authorized for officers. After 1914 the standard khaki service and (subsequently battledress) became normal wear, although the combination of blue and yellow survived in items such as the officer' field service cap.

== Memorial ==
The regimental war memorial in Norwich Cathedral bears the names of 196 officers and men of the Norfolk Yeomanry who died during the First World War. The Muckleburgh Collection at Weybourne, Norfolk, has displays of Norfolk Yeomanry memorabilia.

== Battle honours ==
The Norfolk Yeomanry has been awarded the following battle honours:

First World War

Ypres 1918, France and Flanders 1918, Gallipoli 1915, Egypt 1915–17, Gaza, Jerusalem, Tell 'Asur, Palestine 1917–18

Second World War

None awarded to artillery. The Royal Artillery was present in nearly all battles and would have earned most of the honours awarded to cavalry and infantry regiments. In 1833, William IV awarded the motto Ubique (meaning "everywhere") in place of all battle honours.

== Notable members ==
Among those who served in the K.O.R.R. were:

- Viscount Coke, aristocrat
- W. E. Johns author of the Biggles books
- Frederick Duleep Singh (1868–1926), second son of Maharaja Duleep Singh (last ruler of the Sikhs)
- George Townshend, 7th Marquess Townshend, commissioned into 430 Bty as a 2nd Lieutenant in 1936 and became an officer in the Scots Guards during the Second World War.
- The Hon. John Hare, (later 1st Viscount Blakenham), commissioned into RHQ as a 2nd Lieutenant in 1938, and served with 55 (SY) A/T Rgt during the Second World War.
- Robert, 9th Lord Walpole, a 2nd Lieutenant in 65 (NY) A/T Rgt on the outbreak of the Second World War, transferring to 147th (Essex Yeomanry) Rgt RHA in December 1939.
- The Hon. Francis Crossley, MC, (later 2nd Baron Somerleyton) and his brother, the Hon. John De Bathe Crossley, served as Major and Captain respectively in the Suffolk Yeomanry batteries in the 1920s.
- Sir Maurice Alberic Twisleton-Wykeham-Fiennes, the industrialist, served as a Lieutenant at 108 Fd Bde HQ in the 1930s.
- Arthur Guinness, Viscount Elveden (heir of the Earl of Iveagh), commissioned into 411 Bty as a 2nd Lieutenant in 1932, and was killed on active service as a Major with 55th (Suffolk Yeomanry) A/T Rgt in Holland in February 1945.

== Honorary Colonels and Commanding Officers ==
	List of Colonels-in-Chief	List of Honorary Colonels	List of Commanding Officers/ Officers Commanding
Norfolk (King's Own) Imperial Yeomanry (1901–1908)		King Haakon VII of Norway (1902–08)	Major H. A. Barclay (1901–13)
King's Own Royal Regiment (Norfolk Yeomanry) (including 108th (Suffolk & Norfolk Yeomanry) Brigade, RFA, 65th (Norfolk Yeomanry) Anti-Tank Regiment, RA 389th (Norfolk Yeomanry) Light Anti-Aircraft Regiment, RA) 1908-1961	King George V	King Haakon VII of Norway (1908–57); King Olav V of Norway (1957–61)	Viscount Bury (1920–26); Sir Charles Rowley, Bt (1935–39); W.N. Arnold (1939–40); K.W. Hervey (1940–42); G. Colchester (1942); R.F. Wright (1943); W.B. Stewart (1944)

== See also ==
- Imperial Yeomanry
- List of Yeomanry Regiments 1908
- Yeomanry
- Yeomanry order of precedence
- British yeomanry during the First World War
- Second line yeomanry regiments of the British Army
- List of British Army Yeomanry Regiments converted to Royal Artillery

== Bibliography ==
- Anon, Regimental Badges and Service Caps, London: George Philip & Sons, 1941.
- Burke's Peerage, Baronetage and Knightage, 100th Edn, London, 1953.
- Maj A.F. Becke,History of the Great War: Order of Battle of Divisions, Part 2a: The Territorial Force Mounted Divisions and the 1st-Line Territorial Force Divisions (42–56), London: HM Stationery Office, 1935/Uckfield: Naval & Military Press, 2007, ISBN 1-847347-39-8.
- Maj A.F. Becke,History of the Great War: Order of Battle of Divisions, Part 2b: The 2nd-Line Territorial Force Divisions (57th–69th), with the Home-Service Divisions (71st–73rd) and 74th and 75th Divisions, London: HM Stationery Office, 1937/Uckfield: Naval & Military Press, 2007, ISBN 1-847347-39-8.
- Maj A.F. Becke,History of the Great War: Order of Battle of Divisions, Part 3b: New Army Divisions (30–41) and 63rd (R.N.) Division, London: HM Stationery Office, 1939/Uckfield: Naval & Military Press, 2007, ISBN 1-847347-41-X.
- Col John K. Dunlop, The Development of the British Army 1899–1914, London: Methuen, 1938.
- Major L.F. Ellis, History of the Second World War, United Kingdom Military Series: The War in France and Flanders 1939–1940, London: HM Stationery Office, 1954/Uckfield, Naval & Military Press, 2004.
- Gen Sir Martin Farndale, History of the Royal Regiment of Artillery: The Years of Defeat: Europe and North Africa, 1939–1941, Woolwich: Royal Artillery Institution, 1988/London: Brasseys, 1996, ISBN 1-85753-080-2.
- James, Brigadier E.A. (1978). British Regiments 1914–18. London: Samson Books Limited. ISBN 0-906304-03-2.
- Joslen, Lt-Col H.F., Orders of Battle, United Kingdom and Colonial Formations and Units in the Second World War, 1939–1945, London: HM Stationery Office, 1960/Uckfield: Naval & Military Press, 2003, ISBN 1-843424-74-6.
- Norman E.H. Litchfield, The Territorial Artillery 1908–1988 (Their Lineage, Uniforms and Badges), Nottingham: Sherwood Press, 1992, ISBN 0-9508205-2-0.
- Mileham, Patrick (1994). The Yeomanry Regiments; 200 Years of Tradition. Edinburgh: Canongate Academic. ISBN 1-898410-36-4.
- Rinaldi, Richard A (2008). Order of Battle of the British Army 1914. Ravi Rikhye. ISBN 978-0-97760728-0.
- Lt-Col J.D. Sainsbury, The Hertfordshire Yeomanry Regiments, Royal Artillery, Part 1: The Field Regiments 1920-1946, Welwyn: Hertfordshire Yeomanry and Artillery Trust/Hart Books, 1999, ISBN 0-948527-05-6.
- Edward M. Spiers, The Army and Society 1815–1914, London: Longmans, 1980, ISBN 0-582-48565-7.
- Titles and Designations of Formations and Units of the Territorial Army, London: War Office, 7 November 1927 (RA sections also summarised in Litchfield, Appendix IV).
- Maj C.H. Dudley Ward, The 74th (Yeomanry) Division in Syria and France, London: John Murray, 1922/Uckfield: Naval & Military Press, 2004, ISBN 1-843428-71-7.
- Ray Westlake, British Regiments at Gallipoli, Barnsley: Leo Cooper, 1996, ISBN 0-85052-511-X.
