= King's Road drill hall =

Drill hall in Bury St Edmunds, Suffolk, England

- Bury St Edmunds
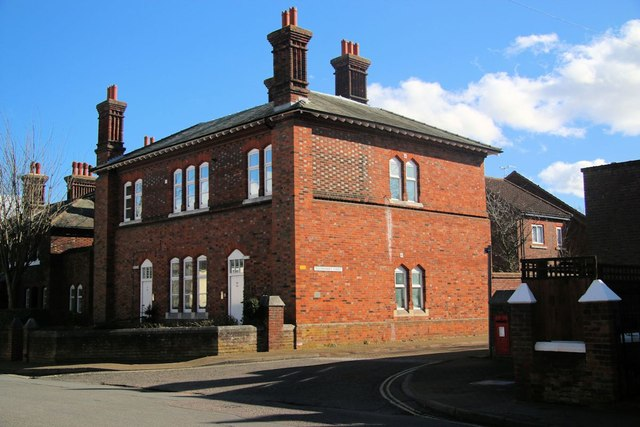
- King's Road drill hall

Site information
- Type: Drill hall

Location
- Location within Suffolk
- Coordinates: 52.24443°N 0.70651°E

Site history
- Built: 1857
- Built for: War Office
- In use: 1857-1977

The King's Road drill hall, sometimes referred to as the Old Cavalry Barracks, is a former military installation in King's Road (formerly Cemetery Road) in Bury St Edmunds. It is a Grade II listed building.

== History ==
The building was designed by Richard Phipson as the headquarters of the West Suffolk Militia Regiment and was completed in 1857. It became the headquarters of the Suffolk Yeomanry in the early 20th century. The regiment was mobilised at the drill hall in August 1914 before being deployed to Gallipoli and, ultimately, to the Western Front. After the war the regiment converted to become 411 (Suffolk Yeomanry) Battery, 108th (Suffolk and Norfolk Yeomanry) Brigade, Royal Field Artillery and then evolved to become 217 (Suffolk Yeomanry) Battery, 55th (Suffolk and Norfolk Yeomanry) Anti-Tank Regiment, Royal Field Artillery in 1939.

After the Second World War, the regiment was re-constituted as 308th (Suffolk Yeomanry) Anti-Tank Regiment, RA with headquarters at Bury St Edmunds. It amalgamated with 358th (Suffolk) Medium Regiment, RA to form 358th (Suffolk Yeomanry) Medium Regiment, RA in 1958 and it amalgamated with 284th (King's Own Royal Regiment, Norfolk Yeomanry) Light Anti-Aircraft Regiment, RA to form 308th (Suffolk and Norfolk Yeomanry) Field Regiment, RA in 1961. During the major reorganisation of the Territorial Army that took place in 1967, the unit was reduced to battery size as 202 (The Suffolk and Norfolk Yeomanry) Battery, RA, part of 100 (Medium) Regiment Royal Artillery (Volunteers). After the regiment left King's Road in 1977, the building was decommissioned and the site was developed for residential use in 1991.
