= 230th Brigade (United Kingdom) =

3rd Dismounted Brigade 230th Brigade
- Active: February 1916–July 1919
- Country: United Kingdom
- Branch: British Army
- Type: Dismounted Yeomanry
- Size: Brigade
- Part of: 74th (Yeomanry) Division
- Engagements: First World War: Egypt 1916–17; Palestine 1917–18; France and Flanders 1918

The 3rd Dismounted Brigade was a formation of the British Army in the First World War. It was formed in Egypt in February 1916 by absorbing the Eastern Mounted Brigade and the South Eastern Mounted Brigade. The brigade served as part of the Western Frontier Force and the Suez Canal Defences.

In January 1917, the brigade was reorganized and redesignated as the 230th Brigade and joined the 74th (Yeomanry) Division in March. It served with the division in the Sinai and Palestine Campaign and on the Western Front.

== 3rd Dismounted Brigade ==
The 3rd Dismounted Brigade, commanded by Henry Hodgson, was formed in Egypt on 22 February 1916 by absorbing the Eastern Mounted Brigade and the South Eastern Mounted Brigade.

The Eastern Mounted Brigade had served dismounted in the Gallipoli Campaign from 8 October to 19 December 1915 attached to the 54th (East Anglian) Division. Similarly, the South Eastern Mounted Brigade served in Gallipoli from 8 October to 30 December 1915 attached to the 42nd (East Lancashire) Division. Both brigades were withdrawn to Egypt in December 1915 and formed part of the Suez Canal Defences. The 2nd Dismounted Brigade was formed with the following composition:

- 1/1st Royal East Kent Yeomanry
- 1/1st Suffolk Yeomanry
- 1/1st Queen's Own West Kent Yeomanry
- 1/1st Norfolk Yeomanry
- 1/1st Sussex Yeomanry
- 1/1st Welsh Horse Yeomanry
- 3rd Dismounted Brigade Machine Gun Company
- 3rd Dismounted Brigade Signal Troop
- 1/Eastern Mounted Brigade Field Ambulance, RAMC
- 1/South Eastern Mounted Brigade Field Ambulance, RAMC

The brigade served as part of the Suez Canal Defences from 14 March to 26 July attached to 42nd (East Lancashire) Division; it then joined the Western Frontier Force. By the end of the year, it was back on the Suez.

== 230th Brigade ==
The brigade was with the Suez Canal Defences when, on 14 January 1917, Egyptian Expeditionary Force (EEF) Order No. 26 instructed that the 2nd, 3rd and 4th Dismounted Brigades be reorganized as the 229th, 230th and 231st Brigades. Consequently, the 3rd Dismounted Brigade was redesignated 230th Brigade on 14 January. The brigade units were reorganized in January and February 1917:

- 10th (Royal East Kent and West Kent Yeomanry) Battalion, Buffs (Royal East Kent Regiment) (Note: 1/1st Royal East Kent Yeomanry and 1/1st West Kent Yeomanry were amalgamated on 1 February 1917 and redesignated 10th Buffs.)
- 12th (Norfolk Yeomanry) Battalion, Norfolk Regiment (Note: 1/1st Norfolk Yeomanry was reorganized on 7 February and redesignated 12th Norfolk Regiment on 11 February.)
- 15th (Suffolk Yeomanry) Battalion, Suffolk Regiment (Note: 1/1st Suffolk Yeomanry was reorganized on 5 January and redesignated 15th Suffolk Regiment on 19 February.)
- 16th (Sussex Yeomanry) Battalion, Royal Sussex Regiment (Note: 1/1st Sussex Yeomanry was reorganized on 3 January and redesignated 16th Royal Sussex Regiment on 28 February.)
- 209th Machine Gun Company (Note: 3rd Dismounted Brigade Machine Gun Company redesignated on 14 January.)
- 230th Trench Mortar Battery (Note: Formed in the brigade on 27 May 1917.)
- 230th Field Ambulance (Note: 1/Eastern and 1/South Eastern Mounted Brigade Field Ambulances were amalgamated as 230th Field Ambulance on 14 January 1917.)

The remaining yeomanry regiment, 1/1st Welsh Horse, was amalgamated with 1/1st Montgomeryshire Yeomanry of 4th Dismounted Brigade at Helmie on 4 March 1917 and redesignated 25th (Montgomery and Welsh Horse Yeomanry) Battalion, Royal Welsh Fusiliers. It joined 231st Brigade on 5 April.

On 23 February, the GOC EEF (Lt-Gen Sir A.J. Murray) sought permission from the War Office to form the 229th, 230th and 231st Brigades into a new division. The War Office granted permission and the new 74th (Yeomanry) Division started to form. The 230th Brigade joined the division at Deir el Balah between 9 and 13 April. 230th Brigade remained with 74th (Yeomanry) Division for the rest of the war.

=== Palestine 1917–18 ===
With the 74th Division, the brigade took part in the invasion of Palestine in 1917 and 1918. It fought in the Second and Third Battles of Gaza (including the capture of Beersheba and the Sheria Position). At the end of 1917, it took part in the capture and defence of Jerusalem and in March 1918 in the Battle of Tell 'Asur. On 3 April 1918, the Division was warned that it would move to France and by 30 April 1918 had completed embarkation at Alexandria.

Before departure for France, the 209th Machine Gun Company joined 4th (of 229th Brigade), 210th (of 231st Brigade) and 261st MG Companies to form 74th Battalion, Machine Gun Corps. It concentrated at Alexandria between 17 and 30 April and departed for France with the division on the latter date.

=== France and Flanders 1918 ===
In May 1918, the brigade landed at Marseille, France with 74th (Yeomanry) Division. It served in France and Flanders with the division for the rest of the war. By 18 May, the division had concentrated around Rue in the Abbeville area. Here the dismounted Yeomanry underwent training for service on the Western Front, particularly gas defence.

Due to a lack of replacements, British (Note: As distinct from the Australian, Canadian and the New Zealand divisions which remained on a 12-battalion basis.) infantry divisions on the Western Front had been reduced from 12 to 9 battalions in January and February 1918. To conform with this new structure, on 21 June, 12th Royal Scots Fusiliers (of 229th Brigade), 12th Norfolk Regiment and 24th Royal Welsh Fusiliers (of 231st Brigade) left 74th (Yeomanry) Division. They were used to reconstitute 94th Brigade of 31st Division which was renamed 94th (Yeomanry) Brigade on that date.

On 14 July 1918 the Yeomanry Division went into the line for the first time, near Merville on the right of XI Corps. From September 1918, as part of III Corps of Fourth Army, it took part in the Hundred Days Offensive including the Second Battle of the Somme (Second Battle of Bapaume) and the Battles of the Hindenburg Line (Battle of Épehy). In October and November 1918 it took part in the Final Advance in Artois and Flanders. By the Armistice it was near Tournai, Belgium, still with 74th (Yeomanry) Division.

With the end of the war, the troops of 74th Division were engaged in railway repair work and education was undertaken while demobilisation began. The division and its subformations were disbanded on 10 July 1919.

== Commanders ==
The 3rd Dismounted Brigade / 230th Brigade had the following commanders during its existence:

From	Rank	Name
22 February 1916	Brigadier-General	H. W. Hodgson
18 February 1917	Brigadier-General	A. J. McNeill (sick, 12 December 1917)
12 December 1917	Lieutenant-Colonel	F. W. Jarvis (acting)
21 December 1917	Brigadier-General	H. B. Orpen-Palmer
12 February 1918	Brigadier-General	W. J. Bowker
1 July 1918	Brigadier-General	A. A. Kennedy

Colonel H.W. Hodgson (promoted to Brigadier-General on 5 August 1914) was the commander of the Eastern Mounted Brigade from 1 April 1912. He took command of 3rd Dismounted Brigade on formation.

== See also ==
- Eastern Mounted Brigade
- South Eastern Mounted Brigade
- British yeomanry during the First World War

== Bibliography ==
- Becke, Archibald F. (1936). Order of Battle of Divisions Part 2A. The Territorial Force Mounted Divisions and the 1st-Line Territorial Force Divisions (42–56). London: HMSO. OCLC 4405016.
- Becke, Archibald F. (1937). Order of Battle of Divisions Part 2B. The 2nd-Line Territorial Force Divisions (57th–69th) with The Home-Service Divisions (71st–73rd) and 74th and 75th Divisions. London: HMSO. OCLC 4405016.
- Becke, Archibald F. (1945). Order of Battle of Divisions Part 3B. New Army Divisions (30-41) & 63rd (R.N.) Division. London: HMSO. OCLC 4405016.
- James, Brigadier E.A. (1978). British Regiments 1914–18. London: Samson Books Limited. ISBN 0-906304-03-2.
- Haythornthwaite, Philip J. (1996). The World War One Source Book. London: Arms and Armour Press. ISBN 1-85409-351-7.
- Westlake, Ray (1996). British Regiments at Gallipoli. Barnsley: Leo Cooper. ISBN 0-85052-511-X.
