= Cattle Market Street drill hall =

Former military installation in Norwich, England

- Norwich, Norfolk
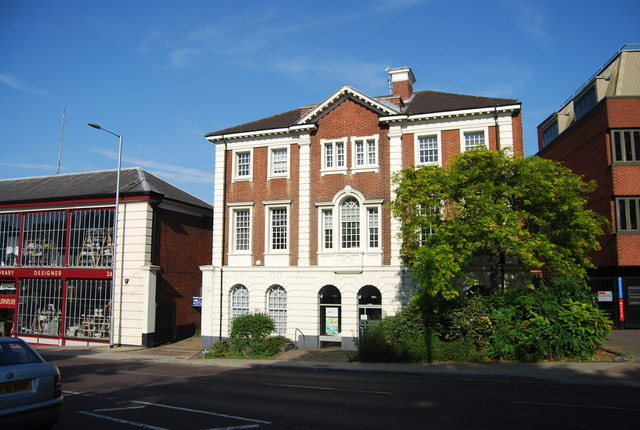
- Cattle Market Street drill hall

Site information
- Type: Drill hall

Location
- Location in Norfolk
- Coordinates: 52.62778°N 1.29867°E

Site history
- Built: c.1900
- Built for: War Office
- In use: c.1900 – c.1945

The Cattle Market Street drill hall is a former military installation in Norwich, United Kingdom.

== History ==
The building, which dates from the early 20th century, became the headquarters of the Norfolk (The King's Own Royal Regiment) Yeomanry at around that time and of the 6th (Cyclist) Battalion, the Norfolk Regiment in about 1910. The 6th Battalion was mobilised at St Giles before being deployed to Ireland and was subsequently disbanded in 1921. Meanwhile, in 1922, the Norfolk Yeomany converted to become the 108th (Suffolk and Norfolk Yeomanry) Field Brigade, Royal Artillery with its headquarters at the Sporle Road drill hall in Swaffham but with 429 (Norfolk Yeomanry) Battery, which was initially based at Swaffham, returning to the Cattle Market Street drill hall a few years later. Following amalgamations during the Second World War, the drill hall was decommissioned and the premises are now used as offices by a firm of architects.

== Sources ==
- Litchfield, Norman E.H. (1992). The Territorial Artillery 1908–1988 (Their Lineage, Uniforms and Badges). Nottingham: Sherwood Press. ISBN 0-9508205-2-0.
