= 179th (2/4th London) Brigade =

Military unit

The 179th (2/4th London) Brigade was a formation of the British Army during the First World War. It was assigned to the 60th (2/2nd London) Division and served in the Middle East. Raised by Colonel, later Brigadier-General, Ned Baird.

== Formation ==
All battalions of the London Regiment as follows:

- 2/13th (County of London) Battalion (Kensington)
- 2/14th (County of London) Battalion (London Scottish)
- 2/15th (County of London) Battalion (Prince of Wales's Own Civil Service Rifles)
- 2/16th (County of London) Battalion (Queen's Westminster Rifles)
- 179th Machine Gun Company
- 179th Trench Mortar Battery

In June 1918 three battalions (2/14th, 2/15th and 2/16th) were replaced by

- 2nd Battalion, 19th Punjabis
- 2nd Battalion, 127th Baluchis
- 3rd Battalion, 151st Punjabi Rifles

== Commanders ==
Commanding officers
Rank	Name	Date appointed	Notes
Colonel	E. W. D. Baird	9 October 1914	
Lieutenant-Colonel	W. R. J. McLean	28 December 1915	Acting
Colonel	E. W. D. Baird	5 January 1916	Promoted brigadier-general 28 May 1916
Brigadier-General	F. M. Edwards	9 November 1916	
Lieutenant-Colonel	C. B. Thomson	6 January 1918	Acting
Lieutenant-Colonel	C. M. Mackenzie	25 February 1918	Acting
Brigadier-General	E. T. Humphreys	28 February 1918	
Lieutenant-Colonel	R. J. L. Ogilby	10 May 1918	Acting
Brigadier-General	E. T. Humphreys	21 May 1918	
