= Wool Winder =

British-bred Thoroughbred racehorse

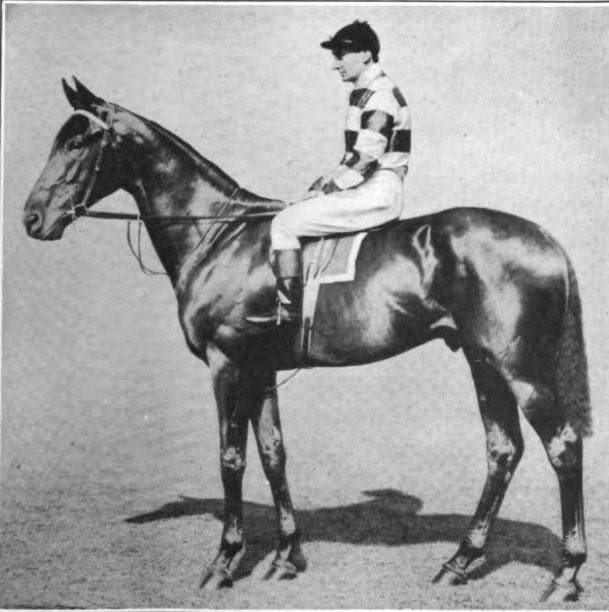
- Sire: Martagon
- Grandsire: Bend Or
- Dam: St. Windeline
- Damsire: St. Simon
- Sex: Stallion
- Foaled: 5 April 1904
- Country: United Kingdom
- Colour: Bay
- Breeder: Ned Baird
- Owner: 1) Edward W. Baird (1904–1909); 2) Austrian Government (1909–1928)
- Trainer: Harry Thomas Enoch
- Earnings: £10,800

Major wins
- St. Leger Stakes (1907); Sussex Stakes (1907); Dee Stakes (1907)

Wool Winder (5 April 1904–28 November 1928), also known as Woolwinder, was a British-bred and raced Thoroughbred racehorse that won the 1907 St. Leger Stakes. Wool Winder excelled as a three-year-old but suffered from health problems in his later career, running rarely in 1908 and 1909. Sold and exported to Austria-Hungary in 1909, he became a successful sire of winners in the 1910s and 1920s before his death of an intestinal infection in 1928.

== Background ==
Foaled on 5 April 1904 at the stud of his breeder Edward William David Baird at Exning, Wool Winder was sired by Martagon, winner of the 1892 Ascot Gold Vase and Goodwood Cup. Martagon was owned by Edward Baird's brother, Douglas Baird. Wool Winder was the first foal of his dam, St. Windeline, who was second to Sceptre in the 1,000 Guineas. St. Windeline was an ill-tempered mare that was prone to kick, notably injuring Theodore Andrea Cook and losing a shoe before running in the Oaks. She also produced Shepherd King, a full-brother to Wool Winder, that was second to Sasanof in the Melbourne Cup and became a successful sire in Australia.

Wool Winder was a large bay colt with black points and a small white star that was described as "beautifully-actioned". He was trained at Newmarket by Harry Thomas Enoch.

== Racing career ==
=== 1906: two-year-old season ===
Wool Winder ran twice in 1906. He was a late developer and was not entered in a race until the July meeting at Newmarket. Running in the Fulbourne Stakes, he was second to Prince of Orange. Wool Winder won the Alington Plate at the Newmarket Second October meeting, easily beating Hill Sprite by two lengths.

=== 1907: three-year-old season ===
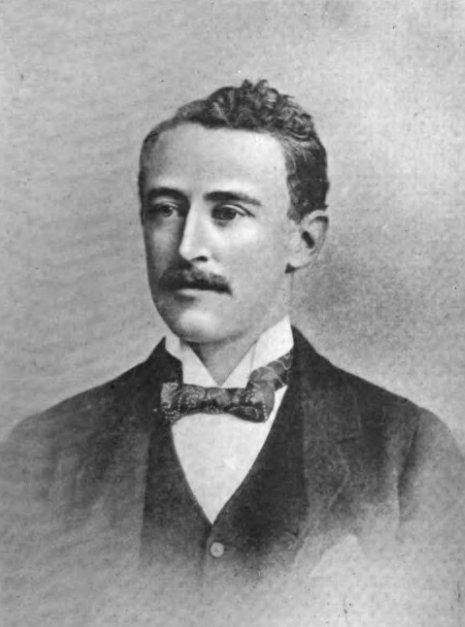
Colonel Edward Baird bred and owned Wool Winder during his racing career.

In April Wool Winder won the Castle Plate, a one and a quarter mile race run at Warwick. Ridden by Otto Madden, Wool Winder was second in the Derby on 5 June to Orby by two lengths, beating third-place finisher Slieve Gallion by half a length. The colt had not been in contention until the last quarter mile but then made rapid progress in the closing stages: he was considered an unlucky loser, with Madden being criticised for giving him too much ground to make up. On 15 June he won the Duchess of York Plate at Hurst Park and on 20 June won the 44th New Biennial Stakes. At Lingfield, Wool Winder emulated his dam by winning the £1,675 Lingfield Park Plate by beating the 1906 St. Leger winner Troutbeck, followed closely by a win in the Sussex Stakes. On 15 August, he won the City of London's Breeders' Foal Stakes, for which St. Windeline walked-over in 1902, at 100 to 15 odds.

On 11 September, Wool Winder won the St. Leger Stakes. He was the betting favourite at 11 to 10 and was uncontested for most of the running, crossing the finish by six lengths over Baltinglass, Acclaim and Larig. Wool Winder ran eight times in 1907 and won £10,556 for Baird.

=== 1908: four-year-old season ===
Heralded as a top prospect for the coming season, Wool Winder was unplaced to the colt Succor in his first outing at the Newmarket March Stakes. Baird attributed the loss to the high 140 pounds (64 kg) weight Wool Winder carried in the running, 7 pounds (3.2 kg) more than Succor. Approached by representatives of the Hungarian government stud in March, Baird refused to sell Wool Winder for £32,000. Wool Winder's form suffered late in the season, and his training was stopped for most of the season in the hopes his health and condition would improve for the Ascot Gold Cup. He was ultimately withdrawn from all of his engagements for the entire racing season due to health and soundness issues, his unsuccessful run in the March Stakes his only outing for the year. In November, Baird offered to sell Wool Winder to the Hungarian government for £25,000, but the offer was refused.

=== 1909: five-year-old season ===
In April at Newmarket, Wool Winder lost by a head to Lafayette in the one and a quarter-mile March Stakes. He finished sixth and last in the Coronation Cup won by J. B. Joel's colt Dean Swift, dropping sharply out of the running shortly after the start. Wool Winder was retired from racing in July 1909 and was sold to the Austrian government stud for an estimated 15,000 guineas (500,000 crowns).

== Stud career ==
Wool Winder stood at Aristides Baltazzi's Napajedla Stud in Austria-Hungary (now Czech Republic) alongside Matchbox and Wombwell. Wool Winder was the leading sire in Austria in 1916 and 1928. He died on 28 November 1928 at 24 years at the Kottingbrunn Stud after contracting an intestinal infection. Considered a success during his lifetime, few of his sons became breeding stallions and his sire line is not prominent in modern times.

== Pedigree ==
Pedigree of Wool Winder (GB), Bay Horse, 1904
Sire Martagon (GB) Bay, 1887	Bend Or; 1877	Doncaster	Stockwell
Sire Martagon (GB) Bay, 1887	Bend Or; 1877	Doncaster	Marigold
Sire Martagon (GB) Bay, 1887	Bend Or; 1877	Rouge Rose	Thormanby
Sire Martagon (GB) Bay, 1887	Bend Or; 1877	Rouge Rose	Ellen Horne
Sire Martagon (GB) Bay, 1887	Tiger Lily; 1875	Macaroni	Sweetmeat
Sire Martagon (GB) Bay, 1887	Tiger Lily; 1875	Macaroni	Jocose
Sire Martagon (GB) Bay, 1887	Tiger Lily; 1875	Polly Agnes	The Cure
Sire Martagon (GB) Bay, 1887	Tiger Lily; 1875	Polly Agnes	Miss Agnes
Dam St. Windeline (GB) Bay, 1899	St. Simon; 1881	Galopin	Vedette
Dam St. Windeline (GB) Bay, 1899	St. Simon; 1881	Galopin	Flying Duchess
Dam St. Windeline (GB) Bay, 1899	St. Simon; 1881	St. Angela	King Tom
Dam St. Windeline (GB) Bay, 1899	St. Simon; 1881	St. Angela	Adeline
Dam St. Windeline (GB) Bay, 1899	Queen of the Spring; 1890	Springfield	St. Albans
Dam St. Windeline (GB) Bay, 1899	Queen of the Spring; 1890	Springfield	Viridis
Dam St. Windeline (GB) Bay, 1899	Queen of the Spring; 1890	Queen of the Hills	Exminster
Dam St. Windeline (GB) Bay, 1899	Queen of the Spring; 1890	Queen of the Hills	Queen of the May (Family 4)
