= Ned Baird =

Cavalry officer

Brigadier-General Ned Baird CBE DL JP
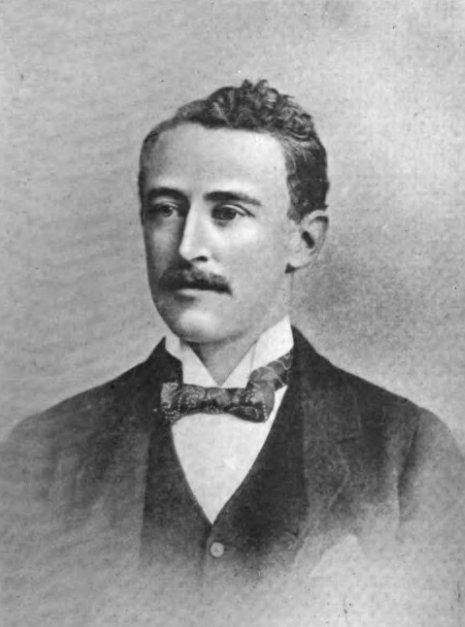
- Born: 29 June 1864
- Died: 8 August 1956 (aged 92)
- Military career
- Allegiance: United Kingdom
- Branch: British Army
- Rank: Brigadier-General
- Nickname: "Ned"
- Units: 3rd (Prince of Wales's) Dragoon Guards; 10th (Prince of Wales's Own) Royal Hussars; Duke of Yorks Own Loyal Suffolk Hussars
- Commands: Duke of Yorks Own Loyal Suffolk Hussars; 179th (2/4th London) Brigade
- Conflicts: Second Boer War; First World War
- Awards: Commander of The Most Excellent Order of the British Empire
- Other work: Horse breeder and trainer Steward Jockey Club; Deputy lieutenant Justice of the peace

Brigadier-General Edward William David Baird CBE DL JP (29 June 1864 – 8 August 1956) was a cavalry officer in the regular British Army and the reserve Territorial Force. Following service in the army, he became a successful horse trainer, winning the Grand National and the St. Leger. He was also a steward at the Jockey Club, a Deputy Lieutenant and a Justice of the Peace.

== Military career ==
Born in June 1864, Edward William David Baird attended Eton College before deciding to join the British Army as a lieutenant in February 1885. Firstly in the 3rd (Prince of Wales's) Dragoon Guards but soon after transferred to the, junior but more socially prestigious, 10th (Prince of Wales's Own) Royal Hussars (later the 10th Royal Hussars). He resigned his regular commission in February 1892.

In November 1896 Baird joined the Duke of Yorks Own Loyal Suffolk Hussars as a major. The Suffolk Hussars was a Yeomanry regiment, part of the Territorial Force (TF). It was as a major that he was seconded for active service with the Imperial Yeomanry, in January 1900, during the Second Boer War. He was mentioned in despatches (29 November 1900) by Lord Roberts, commander-in-chief during the early part of the war. The following year, December 1901, he was promoted to lieutenant colonel and given command of the Suffolk Hussars. After his five years he retired from the reserve in December 1906, and was given the honorary rank of colonel in January 1907.

Having first registered his racing colours in 1887, he became a very successful horse trainer. His horse Playfair winning the 1888 Grand National, that was followed in 1907 when his horse Wool Winder won the St. Leger Stakes, and just missed out on winning The Derby. As a race horse owner he joined the Jockey Club, remaining a member for sixty-two years, and acted as a steward between 1904 and 1906.

During the First World War he was recalled to the army, in October 1914, promoted to temporary colonel, and eventually given command of the 179th (2/4th London) Brigade, part of the 60th (2/2nd London) Division, a TF formation. He was promoted to temporary brigadier general in May 1916. That November the division was warned for service overseas in the Salonika campaign. But Baird now aged fifty-two was deemed too old for active service as a brigade commander and was replaced shortly afterwards. He was again promoted to temporary brigadier general and was given command of the Welsh Reserve Brigade, in the United Kingdom, from January 1917 until May 1918 when he finally retired from the army with the honorary rank of brigadier general. His service was recognised in the victory honours list being invested as a Commander of The Most Excellent Order of the British Empire.

He was appointed a deputy lieutenant of Caithness on 30 July 1920.

He married twice, first in 1893 to Millicent Clarke, by whom he had four sons and three daughters. She died in 1936. Post war Baird married Helen Cicely Kerr, in April 1939. The family lived at Kelloe House, Berwickshire in Scotland, and Baird became a Justice of the Peace until he died 8 August 1956, at the age of 92.
