= South Eastern Mounted Brigade =

- Active: 1908–February 1916
- Country: United Kingdom
- Branch: British Army
- Type: Yeomanry
- Size: Brigade
- HQ (peacetime): Russell Square, London
- Engagements: World War I Gallipoli campaign

Commanders
- Notable commanders: Sir Charles Briggs

The South Eastern Mounted Brigade was a formation of the Territorial Force of the British Army, organised in 1908. After service in the Gallipoli campaign of the First World War, it was absorbed into the 3rd Dismounted Brigade in Egypt in February 1916.

== Formation ==
Under the terms of the Territorial and Reserve Forces Act 1907 (7 Edw.7, c.9), the brigade was formed in 1908 as part of the Territorial Force. It consisted of three yeomanry regiments, a horse artillery battery and ammunition column (provided by the Honourable Artillery Company), a transport and supply column and a field ambulance. The Surrey Yeomanry was attached for training in peacetime.

As the name suggests, the units were drawn from South East England, predominantly Kent, Sussex and Surrey.

== World War I ==
The brigade was mobilised on 4 August 1914 at the outbreak of the First World War and concentrated in the Canterbury area of Kent. The Surrey Yeomanry (attached for training, pre-war) was detached in November 1914 and split up as divisional cavalry squadrons. The rest of the brigade remained in the Canterbury area (under Second Army of Central Force) until September 1915, the Field Ambulance detachment occupying the St Lawrence cricket ground.

=== Gallipoli ===
In September 1915 the brigade was dismounted and left Kent for Liverpool. On 24 September it boarded RMS Olympic and sailed the next day. It arrived at Lemnos on 1 October. The Brigade landed in Gallipoli on 8 October and was attached to the 42nd (East Lancashire) Division. On 30 December it was evacuated to Mudros with 42nd Division; it left the Division at Mudros on 2 January 1916. In this period, the brigade consisted of the three yeomanry regiments, a signal troop and the field ambulance under the command of Br.-Gen. H. Clifton-Brown.

=== Egypt ===
In February 1916, the brigade landed in Egypt and on 22 February was absorbed into the 3rd Dismounted Brigade (along with the Eastern Mounted Brigade). 3rd Dismounted Brigade was later renamed as 230th Brigade in the 74th (Yeomanry) Division.

== Commanders ==
At the outbreak of the war, the South Eastern Mounted Brigade was commanded by Colonel H. Clifton-Brown. Like all of the mounted brigade commanders, he was promoted to brigadier general on 5 August 1914. He was still in command when the brigade was absorbed into 3rd Dismounted Brigade.

== See also ==
- 2/1st South Eastern Mounted Brigade for the 2nd Line formation
- British yeomanry during the First World War

== Bibliography ==
- Becke, Archibald F. (1936). Order of Battle of Divisions Part 2A. The Territorial Force Mounted Divisions and the 1st-Line Territorial Force Divisions (42–56). London: HMSO. OCLC 4405016.
- Becke, Archibald F. (1937). Order of Battle of Divisions Part 2B. The 2nd-Line Territorial Force Divisions (57th–69th) with The Home-Service Divisions (71st–73rd) and 74th and 75th Divisions. London: HMSO. OCLC 4405016.
- James, Brigadier E.A. (1978). British Regiments 1914–18. London: Samson Books Limited. ISBN 0-906304-03-2.
- Lewis, Paul (2013). For Kent and Country. Brighton: Reveille Press. ISBN 978-1-908336-63-7.
- Rinaldi, Richard A (2008). Order of Battle of the British Army 1914. Ravi Rikhye. ISBN 978-0-97760728-0.
- Westlake, Ray (1992). British Territorial Units 1914–18. Osprey Publishing. ISBN 978-1-85532-168-7.
- Westlake, Ray (1996). British Regiments at Gallipoli. Barnsley: Leo Cooper. ISBN 0-85052-511-X.
