= Eastern Mounted Brigade =

- Active: 1908 – February 1916
- Country: United Kingdom
- Branch: British Army
- Type: Yeomanry
- Size: Brigade
- HQ (peacetime): Colchester
- Engagements: World War I Gallipoli 1915

Commanders
- Notable commanders: Henry Hodgson

The Eastern Mounted Brigade was a formation of the Territorial Force of the British Army, organised in 1908. After serving dismounted in the Gallipoli Campaign, it was absorbed into the 3rd Dismounted Brigade in Egypt in February 1916.

== Formation ==
Under the terms of the Territorial and Reserve Forces Act 1907 (7 Edw.7, c.9), the brigade was formed in 1908 as part of the Territorial Force. It consisted of three yeomanry regiments, a horse artillery battery and ammunition column, a transport and supply column and a field ambulance. Three other yeomanry regiments (Hertfordshire, Bedfordshire and Northamptonshire) were attached for training in peacetime.

As the name suggests, the units were drawn from the East of England, predominantly Norfolk, Suffolk and Essex, but also a sub-unit from Cambridgeshire.

== World War I ==
The brigade, commanded by Henry West Hodgson, was mobilised on 4 August 1914 at the outbreak of the First World War, concentrated in the Ipswich area of Suffolk and joined the 1st Mounted Division on formation. In late August it moved to Woodbridge.

On 1 December 1914, the Essex Yeomanry was posted to the BEF, joining the 8th Cavalry Brigade. It was replaced by the 2nd King Edward's Horse. 2nd King Edward's Horse left for the Canadian Cavalry Brigade on 1 February 1915 and was replaced in turn by the Welsh Horse Yeomanry.

In September 1915, the brigade was replaced in the 1st Mounted Division by 2/1st South Wales Mounted Brigade.

=== Gallipoli ===
In September 1915 the brigade was dismounted and left Suffolk for Liverpool. On 24 September it boarded RMS Olympic and sailed the next day. It arrived at Mudros on 1 October. The Brigade landed in Gallipoli on 8 and 10 October and was attached to the 54th (East Anglian) Division. On 19 and 20 December it was evacuated to Mudros. In this period, the brigade consisted of the three yeomanry regiments, a signal troop and the field ambulance under the command of Br.-Gen. H. W. Hodgson.

=== Egypt ===
In December 1915, the brigade landed in Egypt. On 22 February 1916, the brigade was absorbed into the 3rd Dismounted Brigade (along with the South Eastern Mounted Brigade). 3rd Dismounted Brigade was later renamed as 230th Brigade in the 74th (Yeomanry) Division.

== Commanders ==
The Eastern Mounted Brigade was commanded by Colonel H.W. Hodgson from 1 April 1912. He was promoted to Brigadier-General on 5 August 1914. He remained in command of the brigade until it was merged into the 3rd Dismounted Brigade in February 1916; he took command of this brigade on formation. Later, promoted to Major-General, he commanded the Imperial Mounted Division / Australian Mounted Division throughout its existence.

== See also ==
- 2/1st Eastern Mounted Brigade for the 2nd Line formation
- British yeomanry during the First World War

== Bibliography ==
- Becke, Archibald F. (1936). Order of Battle of Divisions Part 2A. The Territorial Force Mounted Divisions and the 1st-Line Territorial Force Divisions (42–56). London: HMSO. OCLC 4405016.
- Becke, Archibald F. (1937). Order of Battle of Divisions Part 2B. The 2nd-Line Territorial Force Divisions (57th–69th) with The Home-Service Divisions (71st–73rd) and 74th and 75th Divisions. London: HMSO. OCLC 4405016.
- James, Brigadier E.A. (1978). British Regiments 1914–18. London: Samson Books Limited. ISBN 0-906304-03-2.
- Perry, F.W. (1992). Order of Battle of Divisions Part 5A. The Divisions of Australia, Canada and New Zealand and those in East Africa. Newport: Ray Westlake Military Books. ISBN 1-871167-25-6.
- Rinaldi, Richard A (2008). Order of Battle of the British Army 1914. Ravi Rikhye. ISBN 978-0-97760728-0.
- Westlake, Ray (1992). British Territorial Units 1914-18. Osprey Publishing. ISBN 978-1-85532-168-7.
- Westlake, Ray (1996). British Regiments at Gallipoli. Barnsley: Leo Cooper. ISBN 0-85052-511-X.
