= John Willans =

John Willans may refer to:

- John William Willans, British mechanical and electrical engineer
- John Bancroft Willans, English landowner, historian, photographer and philanthropist
