= High Sheriff of Montgomeryshire =

Welsh county ceremonial officer

The office of High Sheriff of Montgomeryshire was established in 1541 since then a High Sheriff was appointed annually until 1974 when the office was transformed into that of High Sheriff of Powys as part of the creation of Powys from the amalgamation of Montgomeryshire, Radnorshire and Brecknockshire. Between the Edwardian Conquest of Wales in 1282 and the establishment of the High Sheriff of Montgomeryshire in 1541 the sheriff's duties were mainly the responsibility of the coroner and the Custos Rotulorum of Montgomeryshire. The Office of High Sheriff remained first in precedence in the County until the reign of Edward VII when an Order in Council in 1908 gave the Lord Lieutenant of Montgomeryshire the prime Office under the Crown as the Sovereign's personal representative.

This is a list of High Sheriffs of Montgomeryshire.

== List of Sheriffs ==
=== 16th century ===
- 1541: Humphrey Lloyd of Leighton
- 1542: Sir Robert Acton
- 1543: Lewis Jones of Bishop's Castle, Shropshire
- 1544: Griffith ap David ap John
- 1545: Lewis Jones
- 1546: Reginald Williams, Willaston
- 1547: William Herbert of Park, Llanwnog
- 1548: Matthew Price (commonly called Matthew Goch), Newtown
- 1549: Robert Acton
- 1550: Sir Robert Acton
- 1551: James Leche of Newtown
- 1552: Sir Edward Leighton of Wattlesborough Castle, Salop
- 1553: Nicholas Purcell, Lord of Talerddig
- 1554–1555: Richard Powell of Ednop, Mainstone
- 1556: Henry Acton
- 1557: Sir Edward Herbert
- 1558: Lewis Jones of Bishop's Castle, Shropshire
- 1559: John Herbert of Cemmaes, Buildwas (1st term)
- 1560: Thomas Williams of Willaston
- 1561: Randolph Hanmer
- 1562: John Price of Eglwysegle, Denbighshire
- 1563: Andrew Vavasour, of Newtown
- 1564: George Beynon
- 1565: Randulph Hanmer / Rees ap Morris ap Owen of Aberbechan
- 1566: John Price of Newtown
- 1567: Richard Salwey
- 1568: Sir Edward Herbert
- 1569: William Herbert of Park, Llanwrog
- 1570: Thomas Tanat, Llanyblodwel
- 1571: Robert Lloyd of Plas-is-Clawdd, Chirk, Denbighshire
- 1572: Robert Puleston of Havod-y-Wern
- 1573: John Trevor of Trevalyn
- 1574: David Lloyd Jenkin of Llanidloes
- 1575: John Herbert (2nd term)
- 1576: Richard Herbert of Park, Llanwnog
- 1577: David Lloyd Blayney of Gregynog, Mont.,
- 1578: Arthur Price of Vaynor, Berriew
- 1579: Richard Morris of Rhiwsaeson, Cyfeiliog
- 1580: Thomas Jukes of Buttington
- 1581: Griffith Lloyd of Maesmawr
- 1582: Morgan Gwynn of Llanidloes
- 1583: John Owen Vaughan of Llwydiarth
- 1584: Richard Herbert of Park, Llanwnog
- 1585: David Lloyd Blayney of Tregynon of Gregynog, Mont.,
- 1586: John Price of Newtown
- 1587: David Lloyd Jenkin of Llanidloes
- 1588: Jenkin Lloyd of Perth-lwyd
- 1589: William Williams
- 1590: Morgan Meredith
- 1591: Sir Richard Pryse, Kt of Gogerddan, Cardiganshire
- 1592: Sir Edward Leighton of Wattlesborough Castle, Salop
- 1593: Thomas Lewis of Harpton, Radnor
- 1594: Reginald Williams of Willaston
- 1595: Francis Newton of Heightley, Chirbury
- 1596: William Williams of Cochwillan
- 1597: Thomas Purcell of Dinthill, Forden
- 1598: Edward Hussey of Albrighton, Shropshire
- 1599: Richard Leighton of Gwernygo, Kerry

=== 17th century ===
- 1600: Hugh Lloyd of Bettws
- 1601: Charles Lloyd of Leighton
- 1602: Thomas Jukes of Buttington
- 1603: Sir Richard Price of Aber-bechan
- 1604: William Penrhyn of Rhysnant
- 1605: Sir Edward Herbert of Montgomery Castle
- 1606: Jenkin Lloyd of Perth-lwyd
- 1607: Sir Richard Hussey of Criggion
- 1608: Charles Herbert of Aston
- 1609: Rowland Pugh of Mathafarn, Llanwrin
- 1610: Lewis Gwynn of Llanidloes
- 1611: Rowland Owen of Llunllo
- 1612: Morris Owen of Rhiw-saeson
- 1613: William Herbert of Powis Castle
- 1614: Edward Price of Kerry
- 1615: Edward Price of Newtown
- 1616: Richard Lloyd of Marrington
- 1617: Sir Edward Fox of Gwern-y-go, Ceri and Caynham and Ludlow, Shropshire
- 1618: Thomas Kerry of Binweston, Salop
- 1619: Robert Owen, Woodhouse, Salop
- 1620: Richard Rocke of Meifod
- 1621: Thomas Jukes of Buttington
- 1622: Sir John Pryce of Gogerddan
- 1623: Edward Kynaston of Hordley, Salop
- 1624: Sir William Owen of Condover, Salop
- 1625: Edward Purcell of Nantcribba, Forden
- 1626: Rowland Pugh of Mathafarn, Llanwrin
- 1627: Richard Pugh, of Dolycorslwyn, Cemmaes
- 1628: Evan Glynn of Glynn, Llanidloes
- 1629: Sir Edward Lloyd of Berthlloyd
- 1630: John or Lewis Blayney
- 1631: William Washbourne
- 1632: James Phillips, of Llanrhaiadr
- 1633: Sir John Hayward
- 1634: William Herbert of Meivod / Sir Phillip Eyton of Eyton
- 1635: Thomas Ireland of Vaynor
- 1636: Meredith Morgan, of Aberhafesp
- 1637: Lloyd Piers, of Maesmawr, Guildsfield
- 1638: John Newton, of Chirbury
- 1639: Richard Pryce of Gunley (1st term)
- 1640: Edward Maurice, of Penybont
- 1641: Roger Kynaston, of Hordley, Salop
- 1642: Thomas Nicholls, of Boycott, Pontesbury, Salop
- 1643: John or Lewis Blayney of Tregynon
- 1644: Sir Arthur Blayney of Gregynog and Castleblayney
- 1645–1646: No sheriff appointed
- 1647: Rowland Hunt, of Shrewsbury
- 1648: Mathew Morgan
- 1649: Evan Lloyd, of Llanwnog
- 1650: Lloyd Piers, of Maesmawr, Guilsfield
- 1651: Edward Corbet, 1st Baronet (or Ffoulkes?), of Leighton
- 1652: Richard Pryce of Gunley, Forder (2nd term)
- 1653: Richard Owen, of Rhiwsaeson, Llanbrynmair
- 1654: Hugh Pryce, of Gwernygoe, Kerry
- 1655: John Kynaston, of Plas Kynaston, Rhiwabon
- 1656: Thomas Lloyd, of Trwscoed, Guilsfield
- 1657: Richard Herbert of Parke, Llanwnog
- 1658: Sir George Devereux of Vaynor
- 1659–1660: Sir Matthew Pryce of Newtown
- 1661: Roger Mostyn of Dolycorslwyn, Cemmaes
- 1662: David Powell of Maesmawr, Llandinam
- 1663: Watkin Kyffin of Glascoed, Llansilin
- 1664: Rowland Nicholls of Boycott, Pontesbury, Salop
- 1665: Sir John Wittewrong, 1st Baronet
- 12 November 1665: Edward Kynaston, of Hordley
- 7 November 1666: Arthur Weaver, of Bettws and Morvil, Salop
- 6 November 1667: Evan Lloyd, of Llanwnog
- 6 November 1668: Robert Owen, of Woodhouse, Salop
- 11 November 1669: Sir Charles Lloyd, 1st Baronet
- 1671: Thomas Ireland, of Vaynor, Berriew
- 1672: Thomas Lloyd, of Maesmawr, Guilsfield
- 1673: George Devereux, of Vaynor, Berriew
- 1674: Richard Mytton of Pontyscowryd
- 1675: Evan Glynn of Glyn (replaced Lewk Anwel)
- 1676: David Maurice, of Penybont, Llansilin / George Llewellyn, Shrewsbury
- 1677: John Kyffin, of Bodfach, Llanfyllin
- 1678: John Williams, of Ystumcolwyn, Meifod
- 1679: Sidney Godolphin, of Abertanat, Llanyblodwel
- 1680: John Thomas (of Llanfair), Llanlloddion, Llanfair Caereinion
- 1681: Edward Lloyd
- 1682: Walter Clapton, Clopton, Llandrinio
- 1683: Edmund Lloyd, Trefnant, Castle Caereinion
- 1684: John Lloyd (of Llanovan), Glanhafon, Llanrhaeadr-ym-mochnant
- 1685: David Morris Penybont, of Llansilin
- 1686: Gabriel Wynne, of Dolarddyn, Castle Caereinion
- 1687: Leighton
- 1688: Thomas Mason (of Rockley), Chirbury, Salop
- 1688 (Jan–Nov): Edward Vaughan of Glan-llyn and Llwydiarth
- 1689: Capt. Richard (or John) Pryce of Gunley
- 1689: Richard Stedman (of Kerry)
- 1689: Richard Glinn, of Glynn Clywedog, Llanidloes
- 1689: Edward Lloyd, of Berthlwyd, Llanidloes
- 1690: Arthur Vaughan, of Tedderwen, Llandrinio
- 1691: Philip Eyton, of Criggion
- 1692: Humphrey Kinaston of Bryngwyn, Llanfechain
- 1693: Richard Owen, of Peniarth, Llanegryn, Merioneth
- 1694: Humphrey Lloyd
- 1695: John Read (or Reade)of Llandinam
- 1696: Thomas Severne of Wallop Hall, Salop, and Rhosgoch
- 1697: Thomas Fowkes, of Penthryn, Llandrinio
- 1698: John Cale
- 1699: Udall Corbett, of Leighton

=== 18th century ===
- 1700: Samuel Adderton
- 1701: William Lewis Amwill of Anwyl, Cemaes and Llanfrothen, Merioneth
- 1702: John Felton of Oswestry, Salop
- 1702: William Merideth, of Forden
- 1703: Henry Biggs, prob. of Benthill, Alberbury, Salop
- 1704: Sir William Williams, 2nd Baronet, of Gray's Inn
- 1705: Adam Price, of Bodfach, Llanfyllin
- 1706: Sir Charles Lloyd, 3rd Baronet, of Moel-y-Garth, Guilsfield
- 1707: Richard Lister, of Penrhos, Llandrinio
- 1708: Vaughan Price, of Newtown
- 1709: Francis Herbert of Plas Dolguog, Penegoes, near Machynlleth
- 1710: William Laiton, prob. of Leighton, Wattlesborough, Salop
- 1711: Arthur Devereux, of Nantcribbau, Forden
- 1712: Evan Jones, of Llanlloddion, Llanfair Caereinion
- 1712: Jenkin Lloyd, of Clochfaen, Llangurig
- 1713: Thomas Owen (of Lang Michele), Nantymeichiaid, Meifod
- 1714: John Blayney of Gregynog, Tregynon
- 1715: John Scott
- 1716: Thomas Lloyd, Glanhafon, Llanrhaeadr-y-Mochnant
- 1717: John Herbert (of Kerry), Cwmyddalfa
- 1718: Francis Evans, Cynhinfa, Llangynyw
- 1718: John Evans (son of preceding Sheriff)
- 1719: Brockwell Griffiths, of Bronyarth, Guilsfield
- 1720: Edward Lloyd, of Aberbechan, Llanllwchaiarn
- 1721: John Scot, of Salop
- 1721: Walter Wareing, of Owlbury, Bishops Castle, Salop
- 1722: George Ambler of Buttington
- 1722: Charles Bright, Pentre, Aston, Churchstoke
- 1722: Robert Phillips, Salop
- 1723: John Bright, of Pentre, Aston, Churchstoke
- 1724: Walter Waring (Bishop's Castle MP), of Owlbury, Bishop's Castle, Salop
- 1725: Methusalen Jones (of Hundredale), Meifod
- 1726: Thomas Owen of Llynlloedd, Machynlleth
- 1727: Athelustan Owen, of Rhwsaisan
- 1727: Richard Price (of Trewyllan), Llansantffraid
- 1728: Arthur Devereux of Nanteiibba
- 1729: Richard Mytton of Pontyscowryd
- 1730: Valentine Hughs of Parke
- 1731: John Lloyd of Trowscoed
- 1731: Richard Jones (of Trelludan), Guilsfield
- 1732: Roger Trevor of Bodenfull
- 1733: Roger Mostyn of Aberhrriech
- 1734: Edward Price (of Gunley), Forden
- 1735: Thomas Browne of Mellington Hall, Churchstoke
- 1735: Edward Glynn (of Glynn), Glyn Clywedog, Llanidloes
- 1737: Edward Rogers of Burgeddin
- 1738: Morgan Edwards of Mellyn-y-greg
- 1739: John Thomas (of Aston), Churchstoke
- 1740: Thomas Foulkes of Penthryn
- 1740: Edward Price, of Bodfach, Llanfyllin
- 1740: Corbet Owen, Rhiwsaeson, Llanbrynmair
- 1741: Rees Lloyd, of Cochfaen, Llangurig
- 1742: Henry Thomas, of Llechwedd-y-Garth, Penant Melangell
- 1743: Rees Lloyd of Clochfaen
- 1744: Thomas Foulkes of Penthryn
- 1745: Gabriel Wynne of Dolarthen
- 1746: Thomas Edward of Pentry
- 1747: George Robinson of Birthdire
- 1747: William Mostyn, of Bryngwyn, Llanfechain
- 1748: Sir John Price of Newtown
- 1749: Thomas Lloyd of Trefnant
- 1750: Bagot Read
- 1751: Pryce Jones of Glanhafren
- 1752: Thomas Lloyd of Dongay, Llandrinio
- 1753: William Powell of Poole (Welshpool)
- 1754: William Humphreys of Lluyn
- 1755: Jenkin Lloyd of Cloch faen
- 1756: Richard Powell of Poole (Welshpool)
- 1757: Jenkin Lloyd (or Parry) of Myvod
- 1758: John Lloyd, of Trowesooed
- 1759: George Mears (of Fynnant), Llandinam
- 1760: Richard Owen (of Garth), Llanidloes
- 1761: Richard Pryce of Gunley
- 1762: Roger Wynne (of Trevedrid), Meifod
- 1763: Pryce Davies (of Maesmawr), Llandinam
- 1764: Arthur Blayney of Gregynog, Tregynon
- 1765: Arthur Ambler, of Buttington
- 1766: Owen Owen of Tynycoed, Berriew
- 1767: William Pugh (of Kilthrew), Kerry
- 1768: Thomas Thomas (of Garthgelynenfaur), Penant Melangell
- 1769: Henry Wynne, of Dolarddyn, Castle Caereinion
- 1770: John Baxter (of The Rocke), Llanllwchaiarn
- 1771: John Lloyd, of Talwrn, Llanfyllin
- 1772: Matthew Jones, of Cyfronydd, Castle Caereinion
- 1773: William Wynne (of Abberfrydlan), Llanwrin
- 1774: Edward Lloyd (of Berth Lywd), Llanidloes
- 1775: Clopton Prys, of Llandrinio
- 1776: Arthur Blayney
- 1776: Thomas Proctor, of Aberhavesp
- 1777: Sir John Dashwood-King, 3rd Baronet
- 1778: Henry Shales, of Carno
- 1779: Robert Corbett, of Leighton Hall
- 1780: Robert Howell Vaughan (of Ystim Colwyn), Meifod
- 1781: Hugh Mears (of Finnant), Llandinam
- 1782: Henry Tracy (of Maesmawr), Llandinam
- 1783: William Humphreys, of Llwyn, Llanfyllin
- 1784: Bell Lloyd (of Bodfach), Llanfyllin
- 1785: Samuel Yates, of Llanbrynmair ? also of Welshpool
- 1786: Richard Rocke (of Trefnanney), Meifod
- 1787: Trevor Lloyd, of Glanhafon, Pennant Melangell
- 1788: Robert John Harrison of Cefngwernfa, Berriew
- 1789: Francis Lloyd, of Domgay, Llandrinio
- 1790: Maurice Stephens, of Berth Ddu, Llandinam
- 1791: John Moxon of Vaynor, Berriew
- 1792: Robert Clifton (of Aberbechan), Llanllwchaiarn
- 1793: Thomas Powell, of Llanbrimnair selected but replaced by David Pugh, of Brynderwen
- 1794: John James, of Castle Caereinion
- 1795: Lawton Powell, Welshpool
- 1796: John Dickin, Welshpool
- 1797: Robert Knight, Gwernygoe
- 1798: Jukes Granville Clifton Jukes (of Trelydan Hall), Guilsfield
- 1798: Ralph Leake, of Criggion selected but replaced by William Wheeler Bowen, of Llamlinam
- 1799: John Palmer Chichester (of Gyngorogfawr), Welshpool

=== 19th century ===
- 5 February 1800: Charles Hanbury Tracey, of Gregynog
- 12 February 1800: Henry Procter, of Aberhaves
- 11 February 1801: Joseph Lyon, of Vaynor Park, Berriew
- 3 February 1802: David Edward Lewis Lloyd, of Farm
- 17 February 1802: Pryce Jones, of Cyfronydd
- 10 March 1802: Thomas Jones, of Llanlothian
- 3 February 1803: Robert Knight, of Gwernygoe
- 10 February 1803: John Winder, of Vaynor
- 1 February 1804: Charles Hanbury Tracy, of Gregynog
- 6 February 1805: William Owen, of Bryngwyn
- 7 March 1805: Bagot Read, of Penyrhillan
- 1 February 1806: William Owen, of Bryngwyn
- 4 February 1807: David Edward Lewis Lloyd, of Moydog
- 3 February 1808: Robert Knight, of Gwernygoe
- 2 March 1808: Francis Lloyd, of Domgay
- 6 February 1809: Robert Knight, of Gwernygoe
- 15 February 1809: Thomas Edwards, of Trefuant
- 15 March 1809: John Mytten, of Penylan
- 31 January 1810: Edward Heyward, of Crosswood
- 21 February 1810: John Owen Herbert, of Dolforgan
- 8 February 1811: Edward Heyward, of Crosswood
- 24 January 1812: George Meares, of Fynnant
- 10 February 1813: Ralph Lecke, of Criggion
- 20 February 1813: Edward Corbett, of Plas Gwyn
- 4 March 1813: William Pugh, of Car Howell
- 4 February 1814: Arthur Davis Owen, of Glansevern
- 13 February 1815: Pryce Jones, of Cyfronydd
- 1816: Thomas Watkin Youde, of Cloghfan replaced by John Arthur Lloyd, of Domgay
- 1817: Richard Pryce of Gunley
- 1818: John Edwards (of Machynlleth), Y Plas
- 1819: John Davies of Machynlleth, owner of the Aberllefenni estate and slate quarries
- 1820: John Buckely Williames (of Glanhafran), Betws
- 1821: Valentine Vickers, Criggion
- 1822: Joseph Hayes Lyon of Cefnblwarch, Berriew
- 1823: David Pugh MP (of Llanerchydol), Welshpool
- 1824: Samuel-Amy Severne (of Rhosrgoch), Middletown
- 1825: Phillip Morris (of Trehelig), Welshpool
- 1826: John Hunter (of Glynhafren), Llanidloes
- 1827: John Jones (of Maesmawr), Guilsfield
- 1828: John James Turner (of Pentreheilin), Llandysilio
- 1829: Wythen Jones of Rhiewport
- 1830: Henry Adolphus Proctor, of Aberhafesp Hall
- 1831: Robert Maurice Bonnor Maurice, of Bodynfoel Hall
- 1832: Rear Admiral Sir Charles Thomas Jones, of Broadway (1778–1853)
- 1833: John Jones, of Deythur
- 1834: William Morris, of Pentre Nant
- 1835: Hugh Davies Griffiths, of Llechweddgarth
- 1836: James Proud Johnson, of Monksfields
- 1837: Robert Phillips, of Hiros
- 1838: Martin Williams, of Brongwyn
- 1839: David Hamer, of Glanrafor
- 1840: Thomas Evans, of Maenol
- 1841: John Vaughan, of Rhôs Brynbwa
- 1842: Sir John Roger Kynaston, 3rd Baronet, of Hardwick Hall, Salop
- 1843: Sir John Conroy, 1st Baronet of Plasypennant
- 1844: John Dorset Owen (of Broadway), Churchstoke
- 1845: John Winder Lyon Winder, of Vaynor-Park
- 1846: John Foulkes, of Carno
- 1847: John Offley Crewe Read, of Llandinam Hall.
- 1848: William Lutener, of Dolerw
- 1849: Robert Gardner, of Plas y Court
- 1850: John Davies Corrie, of Dysserth
- 1851: Charles Jones, of Garthmill
- 1852: Edward Salisbury Rose Trevor, of Trowscoed
- 1853: John Naylor, of Leighton-Hall
- 1854: John Edmund Severne, of Wallop
- 1855: Edmund Ethelstone Peel, of Llandrinio
- 1856: Richard Herbert Mytton, of Garth
- 1857: Maurice Jones, of Fronfraith
- 1858: Richard Penruddocke Long, of Dolforgan
- 1859: Edward Morris, of Berth Lloyd
- 1860: William Curling, of Maesmawr
- 1861: John Heyward Heyward, of Crosswood
- 1862: John Lomax, of Bodfach
- 1863: John Dugdale, of Llwyn
- 1864: Major-General William George Gold, of Garthmyl Hall
- 1865: Robert Simcocks Perrott, of Bronhyddon
- 1866: Edwin Hilton, of Rhiewhiriarth
- 1867: Major Joseph Davies, of Brynglas
- 1868: William Fisher, of Maesfron
- 1869: John Pryce Davies, of Fronfeleu,
- 1870: Captain Offley Malcolm Crewe Read, R.N., of Llandinam Hall.
- 1871: John Robinson Jones, of Brithdir Hall
- 1872: Henry Bertie Watkin Williams Wynn, of Plas-nant-y-Meichiad
- 1873: Devereux Herbert Mytton, of Garth
- 1874: Thomas Openshaw Lomax, of Bodfach
- 1875: Richard Edward Jones, of Cefn Bryntalch
- 1876: Richard John Edmunds, of Edderton
- 1877: James Walton, of Dolforgan
- 1878: Richard Woosnam, Glandwr, Llanidloes
- 1879: Colonel George Edward Herbert, of Glanhafren
- 1880: Robert John Harrison, of Caerhowel
- 1881: Sir Thomas Gibbons Frost, of Dolcorsllwyn
- 1882: Nicholas Watson Fairies-Humphreys, of Montgomery
- 1883: Henry Lloyd, of Dolobran
- 1884: Philip Wright, of Mellington
- 1885: Valentine Whitby Vickers, Criggion
- 1886: Peter Arthur Beck, Trelydan, Guilsfield
- 1887: Charles Whitley Owen, Fronfraith, Llanyssil
- 1888: Major William Corbett Winder, of Vaynor Park
- 1889: Henry Leslie, of Bryntanat
- 1890: Qeorge Henry Hayhurst Hayhurst-France, of Ystymcolwyn
- 1891: Sir Pryce Pryce-Jones, of Dolerw, Knight
- 1892: Edward Davies, of Plas Dinam
- 1893: John Cooke Hilton, of Glynhiriaeth, Llanfair
- 1894: Edward Arthur Bonnor Maurice, of Bodynfoel
- 1895: Athelstane Robert Pryce, of Cyfronydd
- 1896: John Marshall Dugdale, of Llwyn
- 1897: John Lomax, of Bodfach
- 1898: Strafford Davies Price-Davies, Marrington, Chirbury
- 1899: Oliver Ormrod Openshaw, of Brongain, Llanfechain, Oswestry

=== 20th century ===
- 1900: Captain Peter Audley David Arthur Lovell, of Llanerchydol
- 1901: Arthur Watkin Williams-Wynn, of Coed-y-Maen, Meifod
- 1902: Hugh Lewis, Glanhafren, Penstrowed
- 1903: John Naylor, Leighton Hall, Leighton
- 1904: Edward Arthur Field Whittel Herbert, of Upper Helmsley Hall, York, Esq.
- 1905: Daniel Wintringham Stable, Plas Llwyn Owen, Llanbrynmair
- 1906: Sydney Rankin Heap, Mellington, Churchstoke
- 1907: Hugh Edmund Ethelston Peel, Llandrinio Hall
- 1908: Arthur Erskine Owen Humphreys-Owen, Glansevern, Berriew
- 1909: Noel Price James Turner, of Sylfaen Hall, Welshpool, Esq.
- 1910: Lord Herbert Lionel Vane-Tempest, Y Plas, Machynlleth
- 1911: Edward Jones, Maesmawr, Llandinam
- 1912: William Henry Burton Swift, of Crescent House, Newtown, Esq.
- 1913: William John Corbett-Winder of Vaynor, Berriew
- 1914: John Murray Naylor, Leighton
- 1915: Reuben Norton
- 1916: Major Hugh Edward Bonsall
- 1917: John Bancroft Willans, Dolforgan, Kerry
- 1918: Reginald Quayle Wilson, Brooklands, Welshpool
- 1919: Major General Arthur Edmund Sandbach, Bryngwyn, Llanfechain
- 1920: Major Harmood Harmood-Banner, Caerhowel, Montgomery
- 1921: Samuel Arthur Sampson, Dysserth, Welshpool
- 1922: William Henry Perry Leslie, Bryntanat, Llansantffraid
- 1923: Sir Edward Pryce-Jones, 1st Bt. of Dolerw, Newtown
- 1924: Robert Carey Chapple Gill, Blwchycibau
- 1925: Herbert Arthur Openshaw, of Brongain, Llanfechain
- 1926: Donald Walter Macpherson, Kerry
- 1927: William Marsahll Dugdale, Llanfyllin
- 1928: Henry Platt Hall, Llanymynech
- 1929: Arthur Lloyd Owen Owen, Machynlleth
- 1930: Francis Reynolds Verdon, Welshpool
- 1931: Hector Carlisle Pilkington, Bryn Tanat, Llansantffraid
- 1932: Lord Davies of Llandinam
- 1933: Humphrey Dod Lynes, Castle Caereinion
- 1934: Dr. Alfred Shearer, Newtown
- 1935: Dr. William Henry Lewis, Llansantffraid
- 1936: Arthur Loftus Onslow, Llanidloes
- 1937: Major William John Burdon Evans, Newtown
- 1938: John Howell Evans, London and Pont Dolanog
- 1939: Evan Emrys Jones, Caersws
- 1940: John Davies Knatchbull Lloyd, Montgomery
- 1941: Charles Gerald Trevor, Guilsfield
- 1942: Henry Morgan, Burnham, Bucks and Newtown
- 1943: Christine Stella Way of Berriew
- 1944: Col. Charles Stafford Price-Davies, Marrington, Chirbury
- 1945: Thomas Evan Kinsey, Caersws
- 1946: Marguerite Frances Hanmer, Llanbrynmair
- 1947: Jano Clement Davies, Meifod
- 1948: Edward William Minton-Beddoes, Church Stretton, Salop and Dolfor
- 1949: George Frederick Hamer, Llanidloes
- 1950: Major Robert John Brymer-Griffith, of Bryneira, Newtown, Montgomeryshire.
- 1951: William Rupert Davies, of Brookland Hall, Welshpool, Montgomeryshire.
- 1952: Dr. Richard Davies-Jones, of Llys Hafren, Llanidloes.
- 1953: Robert William Griffiths, of Woodlands, Forden, near Welshpool
- 1954: Thomas Williams, Forden
- 1955: Major William Mason Marriott, of Park House, Powis Castle Park, Welshpool.
- 1956: Captain Edward Calcott Pryce, Guilsfield
- 1957: Hywel Wynn Oiwen, of The Moorings, Welshpool
- 1957: Ralph Edward Blackett Beaumont
- 1958: Lady Sybil Dorothy Vaughan Hamer (née Owen)
- 1959: Major John Eldon Marshall Dugdale, of The Forest, Kerry, Newtown
- 1960: Lady Lucie Haden Stable, Llanbrynmair
- 1961: Prof. David Vaughan Davies, Llanidloes and London
- 1962: Major Hugh Peter Meredith Lewis, of Milford Hall, Newtown.
- 1963: Charles Lionel Joce Humphreys, of Brithdir Hall, Berriew.
- 1964: David Philip Davies, of Stalloe, Montgomery
- 1965: John Edfryn Jones, of Henblas, Caersws.
- 1966: Joyce Daphne Howard, of Maes From, Trewern.
- 1967: Dr. Nicholas Bennett-Jones, of Plas-y-Coed, Newtown
- 1968: Alun Meurig Jones, of Court Calmore, Montgomery.
- 1969: Edward David Grant Davies, of Cefngwyfed, Tregynon.
- 1970: John Grahame Kynaston Williams, of Trawscoed Hall, Guilsfield.
- 1971: Cecil Edward Vaughan Owen, of Glasgoed, Llanidloes.
- 1972: Stephen Williams, of Black Hall, Newtown.
- 1973: Ion Fitzgibbon Trant, of Maesmawr Hall, Welshpool.
- 1974 onwards – See High Sheriff of Powys

== See also ==
- High Sheriff of Powys
