= John William Willans =

British engineer

John William Willans (c.1843-1895) was a British mechanical and electrical engineer, most known for his role as Chief Engineer of the Liverpool Overhead Railway.

== Early life ==
Willans was born in 1844 in Hunslet, near Leeds to Benjamin and Ann Willans. He trained as a locomotive fitter and engineer with the Leeds company of Kitson.

== Early career ==
Around 1865, Willans moved to Middlesbrough to join the engineering firm of Cochrane, Grove, & Company. He later moved to Hopkins, Gilkes, & Company. In 1872, he received a patent iron ore smelting, along with Stanhope Baynes Smith.

He then moved to Manchester where he set up as a general engineer and contractor.

In April 1871, in Birmingham he married Constance Amelia Smith the daughter of Stanhope Baynes Smith. In 1879, he re-married to Mary Louisa Nicholson.

== Electric railways ==
Willans specialized in electrical engineering, especially for railways. He was the primary contractor for the construction of the Liverpool Overhead Railway, and made a handsome profit from his work. He was later appointed that railway's Chief Engineer.

Willans supplied ironwork for the City and Southwark Subway in the late 1880s. He was the primary contractor for the Great Northern and City Railway from Finsbury Park to Moorgate. He received a patent for an electric motor used for that line.

He was also a Director of the Guiseley, Yeadon & Rawdon Railway.

== Retirement ==
In 1894, Willans purchased Dolforgan Hall from the executors of James Walton. He moved there with his wife Mary Louisa and son John Bancroft Willans. He was appointed as a Justice of the Peace for Montgomeryshire. He was selected to stand as the Liberal candidate for the Montgomery Boroughs constituency in the 1895 election, but died before the vote.

== Death ==
Willans died on 7 March 1895, in London, after a bout of influenza. His wife inherited Dolforgan Hall, and his son lived there until his death in 1957.
