= Edward Lloyd (MP for Montgomery) =

Sir Edward Lloyd was a Welsh lawyer and politician who sat in the House of Commons in 1640. He supported the Royalist cause in the English Civil War.

Lloyd was the son of Jenkin Lloyd of Berthllwyd, Llanidloes and his wife Dorothy Walter, daughter of Edmund Walter of Ludlow. He was admitted to Inner Temple in November 1619. In 1629 he was High Sheriff of Montgomeryshire. He was knighted at St James on 28 June 1630. He was sworn a burgess of Denbigh on 10 September 1632.

In April 1640, Lloyd was elected Member of Parliament for Montgomery in the Short Parliament. He was a staunch Royalist during the Civil War. and was nominated Knight of the Royal Oak in 1660.

Sir Edward married Ursula Salusbury 31 December 1631 at St Mary Aldermanry, London, they had @11 children

Parliament of England
Vacant Parliament suspended since 1629	Member of Parliament for Montgomery; 1640	Succeeded by Richard Herbert
