= Richard Herbert =

Richard Herbert may refer to:

- Richard Herbert of Coldbrook (died 1469), Welsh knight and brother of William Herbert, Earl of Pembroke
- Richard Herbert, Lord of Cherbury (died 1596), English Justice of the Peace and Parliamentarian, grandson of the above
- Richard Herbert, 2nd Baron Herbert of Chirbury (c. 1604–1655), grandson of the above
- Richard Herbert (died 1603/1605), MP for Montgomery Boroughs
- Richard Herbert (died 1510), illegitimate son of William Herbert, 1st Earl of Pembroke
- Richard Herbert (Ludlow MP) (died 1754), British Member of Parliament for Ludlow and Warden of the Mint
- Richard Townsend Herbert (1755–1832), Irish politician
