= John Willes-Johnson =

British Royal Navy officer and politician (1793–1863)

Captain John Willes-Johnson MP

Member of Parliament for Montgomery
- In office 4 May 1861 – 25 July 1863
- Preceded by: David Pugh
- Succeeded by: Charles Hanbury-Tracy

Personal details
- Born: 3 July 1793 South Stoke, Somerset
- Died: 25 July 1863 (aged 70) Highworth, Wiltshire
- Party: Conservative
- Spouse(s): Margaret Ann Pugh (m. 1858) Joanna Burn Smeeton (m. 1849; died 1854) Elizabeth de Windt (m. 1821; died 1842)
- Children: Two

John Samuel Willes-Johnson (3 July 1793 – 25 July 1863) was a British naval officer and for a short time a Conservative Party politician.

== Early life ==
Willes-Johnson was born in South Stoke, Somerset to Charles Johnson and Mary Willes, daughter of the Archdeacon of Wells, William Willes. His sister, Harriet Johnson, married John Owen Herbert of Dolforgan Hall and, after his death, Sir John Edwards, 1st Baronet, of Garth. From her first marriage, she was the mother of Harriet Avarina Brunetta Herbert (wife of Walter Long, eldest son of Walter Long). From her second marriage, she was the mother of Mary Cornelia Edwards (wife of George Vane-Tempest, 5th Marquess of Londonderry).

== Career ==
Entering the navy in 1807, Willes-Johnson became a first class volunteer serving on the Vestal under Captain Edwards Lloyd Graham for two years at Home and Newfoundland stations.

Becoming a master's mate in 1809, he was then placed in charge of the merchantman Fortitude, deploying the ship at Lisbon and Cádiz. During his travels, he succeeded in a ruse de guerre, causing an enemy's armed vessel to sheer off despite not possessing a gun on board on the ship. Willes-Johnson then returned to England, where his arrival was received for three months on the Port Mahon sloop captained by Villiers Francis Hatton. In August 1810, he returned to the seas with Graham on the Pallas, heading for the coast of Norway where he aided in the capture of four Danish privateers and several merchantmen.

Willes-Johnson and Graham then sailed together on the Southampton and Alcmène, the latter of which he went on to the Adriatic Sea where he was involved in a number of boat affairs. One such occasion in 1812 included capturing a Franco-Venetian trabaccolo, including four guns and 30 men, near Lessina Island after a conflict in which many of the enemy's crew were killed, while just four British were slain.

Leaving the Alcmène in 1813, he joined the Pylades sloop with Captain James Erskine Wemyss, before he then became acting-Lieutenant of the Caledonia bearing the flag of the late Lord Exmouth. Willes-Johnson then went on half-pay in 1814, before returning to full pay in 1815. After this he sailed with the Boyne, visiting Naples, Marseille and the Barbary States, and Queen Charlotte, on which he participated in the bombardment of Algiers.

He then had a short further period of half-pay, before being nominated in 1817 to be Flag-Lieutenant to the Impregnable at Plymouth where he remained until promoted to Commander in 1821.

Then, in 1835, he joined Her Majesty's Coastguard for 3 years; and in 1841, he commanded the Wolverine on its voyage to China where he arrived towards the end of the First Opium War. Retiring from active service in 1842, he was made Captain Post in 1847, and a little Captain before retiring altogether in 1847.

=== Writing career ===
Willes-Johnson wrote at least one literary work – A Journal of a Tour through parts of France, Italy and Switzerland, in the years 1823–4 – published in 1827.

=== Political career ===
Willes-Johnson was elected MP for Montgomery at a by-election in 1861, caused by the death of his father-in-law David Pugh, and held the seat until his own death in 1863.

== Personal life ==
He married Elizabeth de Windt, daughter of John de Windt, in Paris in 1821, and they had one child:

- Elizabeth Sarah Johnson (1825–1870), who married Capt. Joseph Clayton Jennyns de Windt of Blunsdon House.

After Elizabeth's death in 1842, in 1849 he married secondly Joanna Burn Smeeton, who died five years later. In 1858, Willes-Johnson married thirdly Margaret Ann Pugh, daughter of David Pugh and Ann née Vaughan, and they had two daughters:

- Harriet Mildred Vaughan Johnson (1860–1938), who in 1880 married Henry Jenner Scobell, an army officer; in the 1921 census, her name is given as "H. Mildred V. Scobell", suggesting that she was known as Mildred;
- Maud Felicia Frances Ann Johnson (1862–1919), who married Robert Chaloner Critchley Long, son of Richard Penruddocke Long and Charlotte Anna Hume, in 1884.

He died at 'Westhill' in Highworth, Wiltshire and was buried at Hannington.

=== Descendants ===
Through his eldest daughter Elizabeth, he was a grandfather of Harry de Windt (who married (1) Frances Laura Arabella Long, sister of the 1st Viscount Long; (2) Hilda Frances Clark, daughter of the Rev. William Robinson Clark; and (3) actress Charlotte Elizabeth Ihle, better known by her stage name, Elaine Inescourt) and Margaret Alice Lili de Windt (who married Charles Brooke, Rajah of Sarawak).

Parliament of the United Kingdom
Preceded by David Pugh	Member of Parliament for Montgomery; 1861–1863	Succeeded by Charles Hanbury-Tracy
