= Milk bar =

Suburban local general store or café

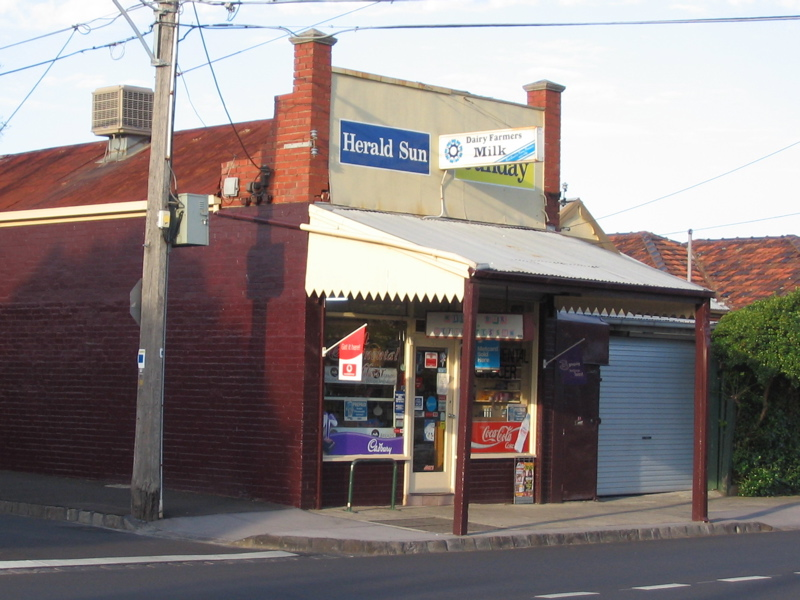
A milk bar in the Melbourne suburb of Fitzroy North

A milk bar is an establishment that primarily sells dairy-based foods and beverages, often at affordable prices, and typically provides seating for customers. Their specific form and offerings can vary significantly by country.

== History ==
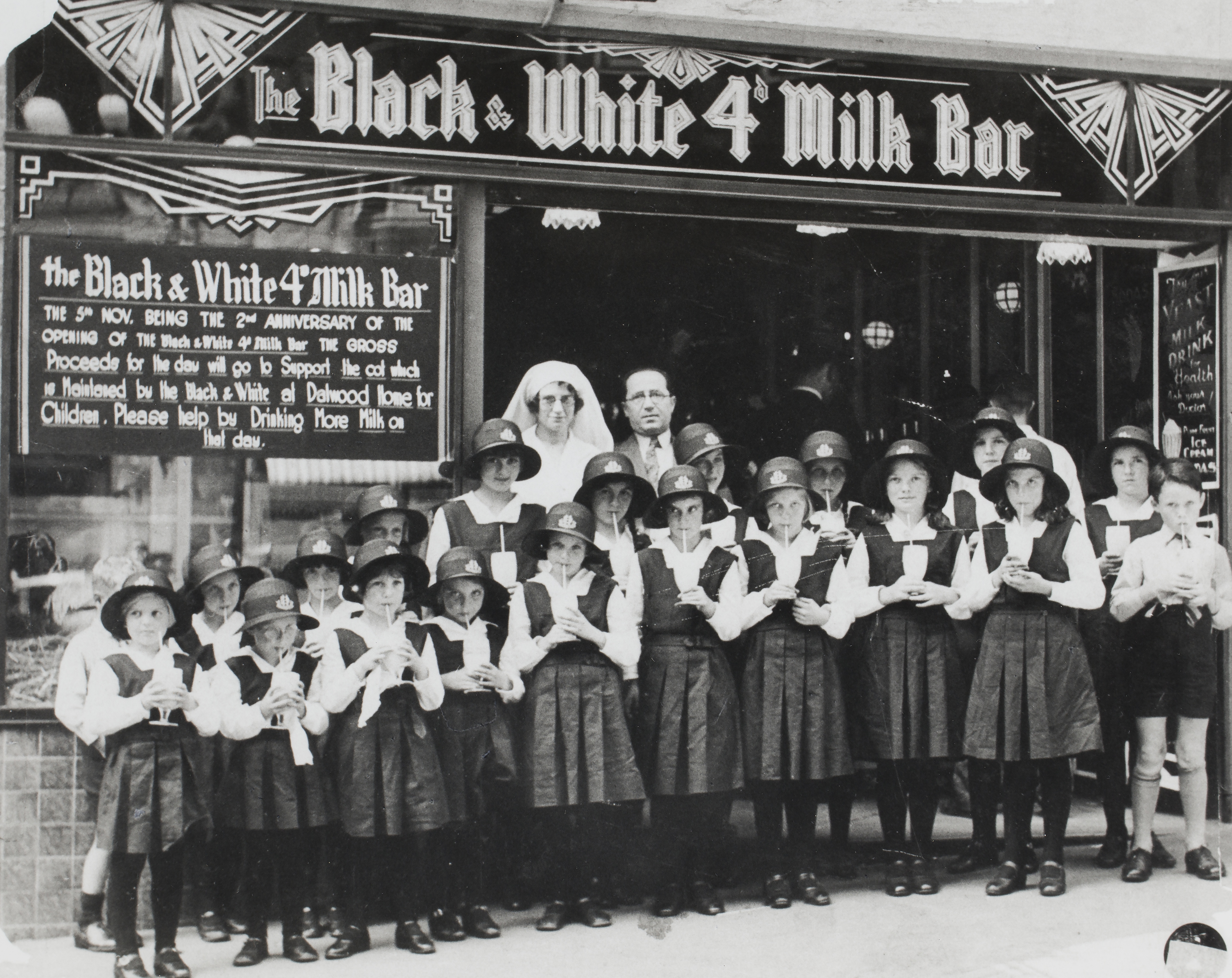
Black & White Milk Bar, Martin Place, Sydney, 1934

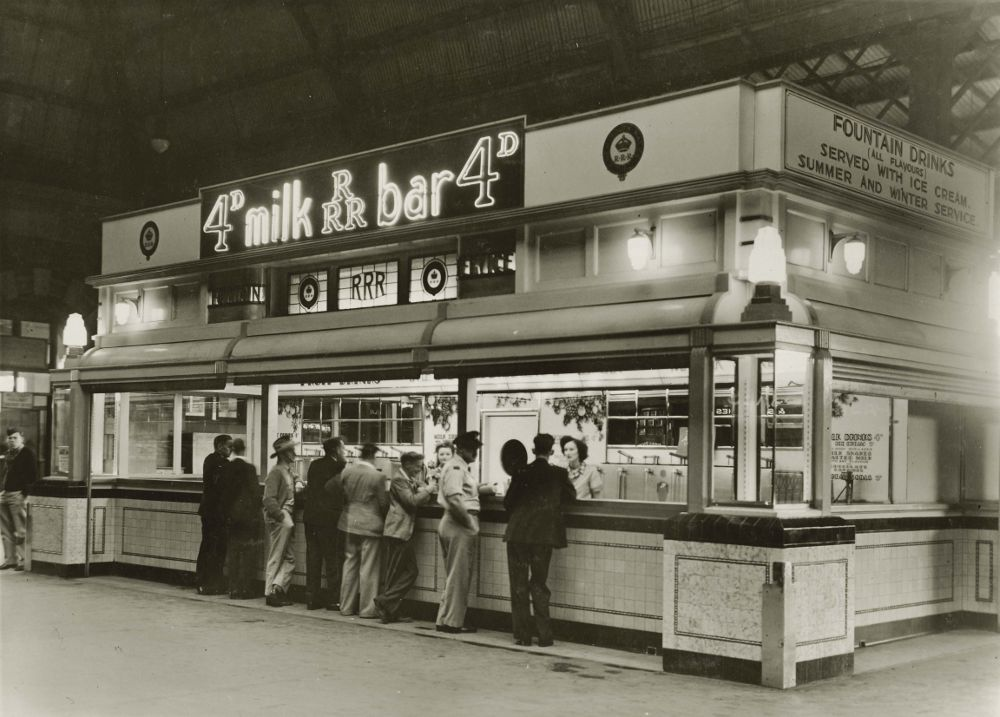
Central railway station, Sydney milk bar, 1946

The first "milk bar" was established in 1896 by a milk farmer Stanisław Dłużewski who established Nadświdrzańska at Nowy Świat in Warsaw.

Nadświdrzańska was a response to a contemporary emerging health culture, offering simple, natural products; kefir was commonly consumed among the middle class. The clientele was diverse and included working class, working people with university educations, artists, and socialites.

By 1918, the concept of milk bars, known as mleczarnia or bar mleczny, had become widespread throughout Poland. They were subsidized by the government as a poverty reduction measure, providing affordable and nutritious meals. Visits to the milk bars increased during the interwar period, particularly during the Great Depression. Later on, milk bars would also offer ice cream as an item on their menu.

By the 1930s, the idea reached Britain from the US. In 1933, a milk farmer Robert William Griffiths established one of Britain's first milk bar in Colwyn Bay which later grew into a chain known as National Milk Bar company. The concept soon spread in Great Britain further, encouraged by the Temperance Society as a morally acceptable alternative to the pub, and over 1,000 milk bars had opened nationally by the end of 1936.

Milk bars were known in the United States at least as early as 1940 as evidenced by contemporary radio recordings. By the late 1940s, milk bars had evolved to not only sell groceries, but were also places where young people could buy ready-made food and non-alcoholic drinks, and could socialise. Milk bars often had jukeboxes and pinball machines (later upgraded to video games), with tables and chairs to encourage patrons to linger and spend more money.

The milk bar as a social venue was gradually replaced by fast food franchises, such as McDonald's, and shopping malls. Much of the elaborate decor has disappeared from the remaining milk bars. They are still found in many areas, often serving as convenience stores.

== Modern day ==
=== America ===
==== United States ====
A "dairy bar" is the term for a similar restaurant/store common in the Northeastern United States, especially upstate New York, which is a large producer of dairy products. A "malt shop" (named for the ingredient in a malted milkshake) is very similar to a milk or dairy bar, serving milkshakes and soft drinks as well as limited foods, such as hamburgers and sandwiches. Although there are still a few around, these have largely fallen out of fashion in favor of fast food.

=== Europe ===
==== Poland ====
The term bar mleczny (lit. 'milk bar') continues to be used in Poland to describe cafeterias offering nutritious, often traditional Polish, food for low prices. While historically known for their dairy-based dishes, milk bars today also serve a wide variety of other affordable meals. In 2011, the Polish government began to withdraw their subsidies which led to protests from people opposed to their closure. However, they continue to be supported by the state.

The menu of milk bars in Poland would typically include the following dishes:

- zupa mleczna (‘milk soup’) - warm milk often served with rice, pasta, or other grains, and frequently sweetened with sugar or pieces of fruit,
- pierogi leniwe (‘lazy dumplings’), or sometimes simply leniwe: These are dumplings made from twaróg (sour cottage cheese), flour, and eggs, which are quickly boiled. They are called "lazy" because they don't require the time-consuming stuffing process of traditional pierogi. They are often served with toppings like melted butter, sugar, or a sprinkle of cinnamon,
- rice with fruit and double cream - cooked rice served with fruit (often stewed fruit or compote) and a dollop of cream.
- kompot

These dishes are now associated with wider Polish cuisine. While milk bars today may offer a wider range of dishes, including some with meat, the core remains dairy-centric meals that were historically central to their identity.

==== United Kingdom ====
In the United Kingdom, the National Milk Bar franchise was founded in 1933 by Robert William Griffiths as an ordinary café/restaurant chain which is related to the original milk bars in name only. Once numbering around 20 outlets, which were located in Wales and in England near the Welsh border, now only one remains. In the UK, corner shops serve a similar function to milk bars in modern Australia, providing everyday groceries, sweets, newspapers and such.

There is a campaign in the United Kingdom to encourage schoolchildren to consume more dairy products, by installing 'milk bars' in schools. The idea is that if the dairy products are attractively presented and properly stored, the children will be more willing to buy them. The organisers behind the project work to develop links with school caterers, so that the handling of milk and dairy produce can be improved, and they promote milk consumption and encourage milk drinking to become a habit that will be carried into adulthood. The milk bar project has been extremely successful in Scotland for 18 years, and it is currently being extended across England and Wales.

=== Oceania ===
In Australia, a milk bar is a suburban local general store which can include delicatessens or "delis" and corner shops or corner stores. Similar, but not identical, establishments include tuck shops. Milk bars are traditionally a place where people buy newspapers, and fast-food items such as fish and chips, hamburgers, milkshakes, and snacks. They are essentially a smaller-scale suburban form of the convenience store but are more likely to be "mum and dad" small businesses rather than larger franchised operations. The term is also found in New Zealand, alongside the more local term dairy.

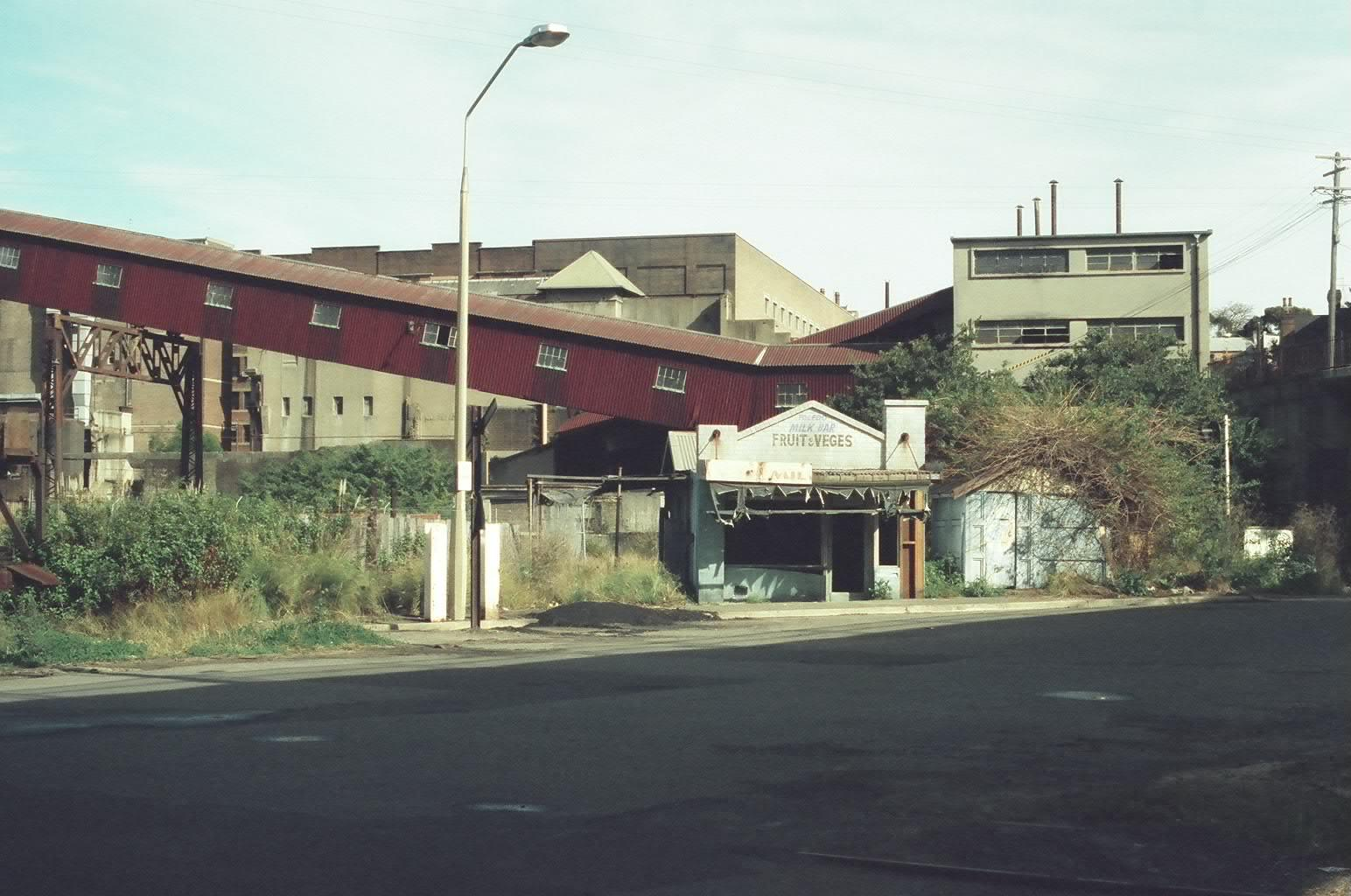
Milk bar film-set from Strictly Ballroom at former Darling Island Junction rail yard, Pyrmont

Milk bars in Australia today almost universally sell ice creams, lollies, chocolate bars, soft drinks, newspapers, bread, cigarettes and occasionally fast food. Most generally serve milk (in cartons or bottles) or other dairy related products.

Although there are far fewer milk bars than there were during the 1970s and 80s due to changing shopping habits, most people living in suburban areas still have a milk bar within walking distance or a short drive of their home. Today, many of them are owned by immigrants of different generations.

In conducting researches on the linguistic changes occurring in Sydney, Horvath (1985) discussed the case of immigrant milk bar owners and how diverse their social status can be. Some of them run a small family business while others own several chains. This proved relevant for a new approach to concepts of status and class in Australia as opposed to the United States.

The term dairy is also used for these establishments in some places, particularly in New Zealand. In the New Zealand context, the term Milk Bar historically described an establishment distinct from the modern dairy, and closer to a café, which served dairy-based beverages including coffee and milkshakes, often serving food and occasionally selling items of convenience. These establishments have largely been replaced by dairies and cafés.

== See also ==
- Ice cream parlor
- Milkman
- Newsagent's shop
