= 1877 Montgomery Boroughs by-election =

UK Parliamentary by-election

The 1877 Montgomery Boroughs by-election was fought on 15 May 1877. The by-election was fought due to the succession to a peerage of the incumbent Liberal MP, Hon. Charles Hanbury-Tracy. It was won by the Liberal candidate Hon. Frederick Hanbury-Tracy who was a lieutenant-colonel in the Worcester Yeomanry.

1877 Montgomery Boroughs by-election
Party	Candidate	Votes	%	±%
Liberal	Frederick Hanbury-Tracy	1,447	56.4	N/A
Conservative	Charles Vane-Tempest	1,118	43.6	N/A
Majority		329	12.8	N/A
Turnout		2,565	88.0	N/A
Registered electors		2,914		
Liberal hold		Swing	N/A	
