= Horse close wood =

Horse Close Wood can refer to:

- Horse Close Wood, a wood near Haughton Green, UK
- Horse Close Wood, a wood in Wimbledon Park, London, UK
- Horse Close Wood, a Woodland Trust wood near Buckland Newton, Dorset, UK
