= Sir John Edwards, 1st Baronet, of Garth =

The Right Honourable Sir John Edwards, Bt

Member of Parliament for Montgomery
- In office 8 April 1833 – 23 June 1841
- Preceded by: David Pugh
- Succeeded by: Hon. Hugh Cholmondeley

Personal details
- Born: 15 January 1770
- Died: 15 April 1850 (aged 80) Wrexham, Wales
- Party: Whig
- Spouse(s): Catherine Brown (m. 1792; died 1821) Harriet Johnson Herbert (m. 1825; died 1850)
- Relations: Charles Vane-Tempest-Stewart, 6th Marquess of Londonderry (grandson)
- Children: Mary Vane-Tempest, Marchioness of Londonderry
- Parent(s): John Edwards; Cornelia Owen

Sir John Edwards, 1st Baronet (15 January 1770 – 15 April 1850), was a Whig politician who served as Member of Parliament for Montgomery from 8 April 1833 to 23 June 1841. The Edwards Baronetcy, of Garth in the County of Montgomery, was created for him in the Baronetage of the United Kingdom on 23 July 1838.

== Early life ==
Edwards was the son of John Edwards (d. 1789), a solicitor of Plas Machynlleth (also known as 'Greenfields'), Montgomeryshire, and his third wife, Cornelia (née Owen) Edwards. His father acquired the Garth estate, including the profitable Van lead mines, by his marriage to John's mother, the only child and heiress of Richard Owen. His sister, Mary Edwards, married John Mirehouse of Brownslade, Pembrokeshire, Wales, the High Sheriff of Pembrokeshire.

== Career ==
In 1808, he was appointed Lieutenant-Colonel Commandant of the Western Montgomeryshire Local Militia.

Sir John added to the mansion, and expanded the Garth estate by purchase of parts of the Peniarth Estate along the Dyfi Valley.

In an 1833 by-election to replace David Pugh, who was unseated on petition, he was elected a Whig Member of Parliament for Montgomery. Edwards served until 23 June 1841 when he was succeeded by Hon. Hugh Cholmondeley.

== Personal life ==
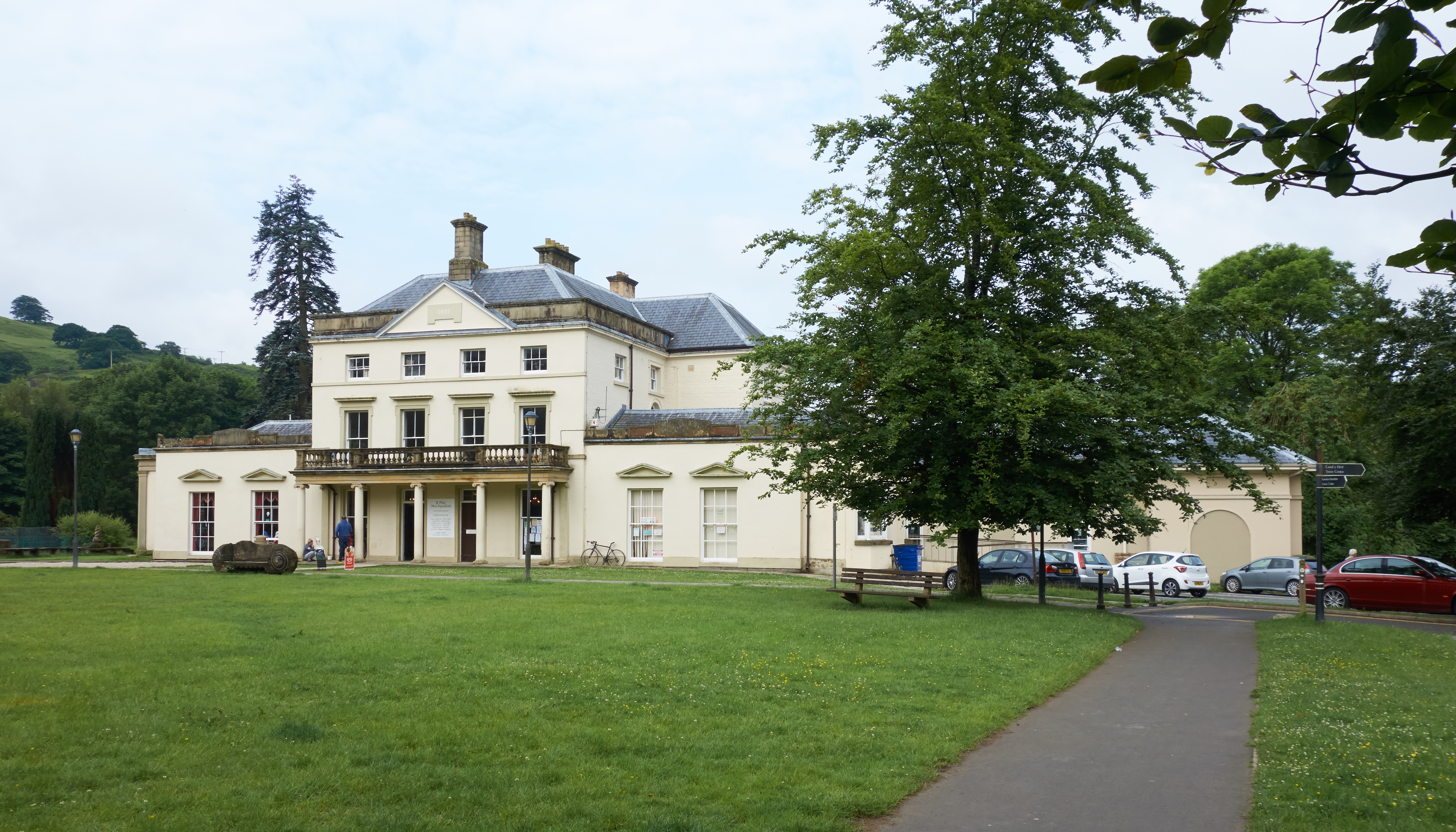
Plas Machynlleth

On 1 January 1792, Edwards was married to Catherine Brown, the eldest daughter of Thomas Brown, of Millington Hall, Montgomery. She died, without issue, on 21 January 1821.

On 7 December 1825, Sir John was married to the widow, Harriet (née Johnson) Herbert (1801–1882), a daughter of the Rev. Charles Johnson and Mary (née Willes) Johnson (a daughter of Rev. Dr. William Willes, the Archdeacon of Wells). From her first marriage to John Owen Herbert of Dolforgan Hall, she was the mother of Harriet Avarina Brunetta Herbert, who married Walter Long (eldest son of Walter Long). Harriet's brother was John Willes-Johnson, an officer in the Royal Navy who served as MP for Montgomery. Together, they were the parents of:

- Mary Cornelia Edwards (1826–1906), who married George Vane-Tempest, Viscount Seaham, later to become Earl Vane and the 5th Marquess of Londonderry, in 1846.

Sir John died at Wrexham in Wales on 15 April 1850. Since he had no male heirs, the estate passed to his daughter Mary Cornelia Edwards (c. 1829-1906) and the title became extinct on his death. After his death, Mary and Lord Londonderry used Plas Machynlleth as their family seat.

=== Descendants ===
Through his only child Mary, he was a grandfather of Lady Frances Cornelia Harriet Emily Vane-Tempest, Lady Avarina Mary Vane-Tempest, Charles Vane-Tempest-Stewart, 6th Marquess of Londonderry, Lord Henry John Vane-Tempest, Lord Sir Herbert Lionel Vane-Tempest, and Lady Alexandrina Vane-Tempest (wife of Wentworth Beaumont, 1st Viscount Allendale).

Parliament of the United Kingdom
Preceded by David Pugh	Member of Parliament for Montgomery; 1833–1841	Succeeded by Hon. Hugh Cholmondeley
Baronetage of the United Kingdom
New creation	Baronet (of Garth); 1838–1850	Extinct
Preceded by Crompton baronets	Edwards baronets of Garth; July 1838	Succeeded by Boileau baronets
