= Richard Lloyd (by 1531 – 1570) =

English politician

Richard Lloyd (by 1531 – 25 October 1570), of Marrington, Shropshire, was an English politician.

Lloyd was a member of parliament for Montgomery Boroughs in April 1554 and November 1554.
