= George Devereux (MP for Montgomery) =

Former English Politician

George Devereux was an English politician who sat in the House of Commons from 1647 to 1653.

Devereux was the son of Sir George Devereux of Sheldon Hall, Warwickshire, and was a nephew of Walter Devereux, 5th Viscount Hereford.

In 1647, Devereux was elected Member of Parliament for Montgomery and sat through the Rump Parliament until 1653. He was High Sheriff of Montgomeryshire in 1658.

Devereux was of Nantcribba in the parish of Forden, near Welshpool, and was living in 1666. He married Bridget Price, daughter and heiress of Arthur Price of Vaynor, who had been the member of parliament for Montgomery in 1571.

His grandson Price Devereux became the ninth Viscount Hereford.

Parliament of England
Preceded by Richard Herbert	Member of Parliament for Montgomery; 1647–1653	Succeeded by Not represented in Barebones Parliament
