= James Walton (inventor) =

English card clothing manufacturer

- Born: April 15, 1803; Ripponden, West Yorkshire, England
- Died: November 5, 1883 (aged 80); Dolforgan Hall, Kerry, Wales
- Occupations: Inventor, industrialist
- Known for: Improvements to the carding process; founding James Walton & Sons
- Notable work: Haughton Dale Mills, St. Mary's Church (Haughton Green)
- Title: High Sheriff of Montgomeryshire (1877)

James Walton (15 April 1803 – 5 November 1883) was a British inventor and industrialist. He was known for the significant improvements he made to the carding process. He amassed a considerable fortune from his business ventures, and purchased two large family estates in Wales.

== Early life ==
Walton was born on 15 April 1803 at Ripponden. His father Isaac Walton worked as a friezer.

== Halifax and Sowerby Bridge ==
In 1822, Walton moved to a small workshop near North Bridge, Halifax to develop his ideas for new machinery for friezing. He quickly developed these ideas, and in 1824, moved to a larger factory at Sowerby Bridge. In his first year in business he developed a new method of friezing "Petersham". He also constructed the largest planing machine built in the United Kingdom.

In the early 1830s, Walton developed a new form of wire-card for use in textile manufacturing. This replaced the traditional leather backing for the card with india rubber laid on cloth. This was a superior system and became the standard for the carding industry, and enabled him to obtain his first patent.

== Manchester ==
In 1838, Walton joined Parr, Curtis and Co. in Manchester, and began making his cards using machines, instead of by hand. He purchased an American card-setting machine and made significant improvements to its efficiency. In 1839, Walton sued a rival company for infringement on his carding patent. This case, known as Walton v. Potter and Horsfall, continued until 1843. Walton won the case, but it left him with a lifelong dislike of legal proceedings. In 1842, the works of Curtis, Parr and Walton was almost destroyed in a fire.

During the 1840s he obtained a number of other patents for further improvements to machinery and manufacturing processes.

The partnership of Parr, Curtis and Walton was a great success. The company moved from its original premises in Store Street, to a much larger factory in Ancoats.

== Haughton Dale ==
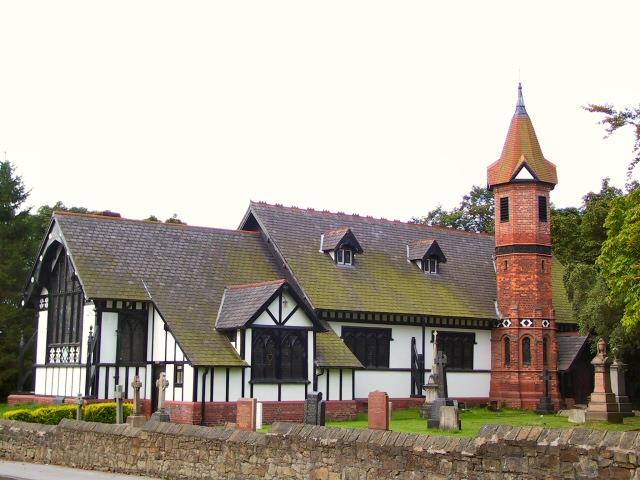
St. Mary's Church, Haughton Green, built by James Walton

In 1853, Walton ended the partnership with Parr and Curtis. He built a new factory in Haughton Dale to the south-east of Manchester, which opened in 1857. There he established the company of James Walton & Sons, supplying machinery and cards to the textile industry of Great Britain and beyond. The factory was the largest of its kind in the world. His sons William and Frederick joined him in the business, though Frederick left in 1863 to pursue his own invention, Linoleum. The Haughton Dale Mills as the factory was known as described by the Manchester Guardian as "the largest establishment of the kind in the world".

Walton was a very successful businessman, described as:

...remarkable in his inventive genius. Like Brindley and Arkwright and other great leaders of industry who have established supremacy of England as a manufacturing nation, he was a man of marked individuality of character, of mental vision, strength of will and steadfastness of purpose and he has left behind him a long list of original ideas many of which were carried into practice and assisted greatly in increasing the productive powers of the great cotton spinning trade.

In 1875, Walton began construction of the Anglican Church of St. Mary the Virgin in Haughton Dale. This was consecrated in 1876 by the Bishop of Manchester. He also built Haughton Dale Mills School in the village.

In 1887, James Walton & Sons exhibited one of Walton's card setting machines at the 1887 Manchester Jubilee Exhibition.

== Cwmllecoediog Hall ==
In the 1850s, Walton lived at Compstall Hall, south-east of Manchester. In 1860, he purchased the Cwmllecoediog estate, near Aberangell in Wales and spent much of his time there.

== Dolforgan Hall ==
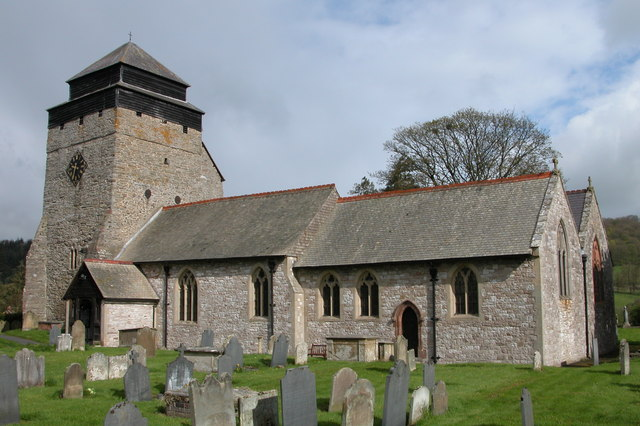
St. Michael's Church, Kerry, which was rebuilt in 1882, substantially funded by Walton

In 1868, Walton purchased the even larger Dolforgan Hall near Kerry, Powys which covered 4,250 acres (17.2 km^{2}). From 1870, Dolforgan Hall was his primary residence, leaving Cwmllecoediog to his sons William and Frederick. In 1877, Walton served as High Sheriff of Montgomeryshire. He was a significant benefactor of St. Michael's Church in Kerry, paying a large amount towards the rebuilding of the church in 1882.

Walton died on 5 November 1883, at Dolforgan Hall. after his death, the family sold the Dolforgan Estate to John William Willans, and it was inherited by his son John Bancroft Willans.

== Family ==
Walton married Anne Kenworthy (died 1885). They had two sons, William and Frederick, and a daughter Anne.
