= Wyndham Dunstan =

British academic (1861–1949)

KCMG FRS FCS Wyndham Dunstan
- Born: May 24, 1861
- Died: April 20, 1949 (aged 87)
- Scientific career
- Fields: Chemistry
- Institutions: Royal Pharmaceutical Society; Imperial Institute

Sir Wyndham Rowland Dunstan KCMG FRS FCS (1861-1949), was professor of chemistry and Director of the Imperial Institute in London.

== Biography ==
Dunstan was born on 24 May 1861 at Chester Castle, where his father, John Dunstan (1797-1874), was Constable. He was educated at Bedford School before becoming an assistant to Theophilus Redwood, Professor of Chemistry at the Royal Pharmaceutical Society in London.

In 1884, Dunstan was appointed as Demonstrator in the University Laboratories at the University of Oxford and, in 1885, as University Lecturer in Chemistry. In 1886, he succeeded Redwood as Professor of Chemistry at the Royal Pharmaceutical Society and, in 1903, he was appointed Professor of Chemistry and Director of the Imperial Institute in London.

He acted as President of the International Association of Tropical Agriculture and was a Member of the Advisory Committee for Tropical Agriculture.

In 1886, he married Emilie Fordyce Maclean. After she died in 1893, he married Violet Mary Claudia Hanbury-Tracy (1876-1963), daughter of Frederick Hanbury-Tracy, in 1900. He died on 20 April 1949.
