= John ab Edmund =

Member of the Parliament of England

John ab Edmund (by 1525–1553 or later), of Montgomery, Powys, was a Welsh politician.

== Career ==
John was a Member of Parliament for Montgomery Boroughs October 1553.
