= Bar mleczny =

Polish cafeteria providing government-subsidized meals

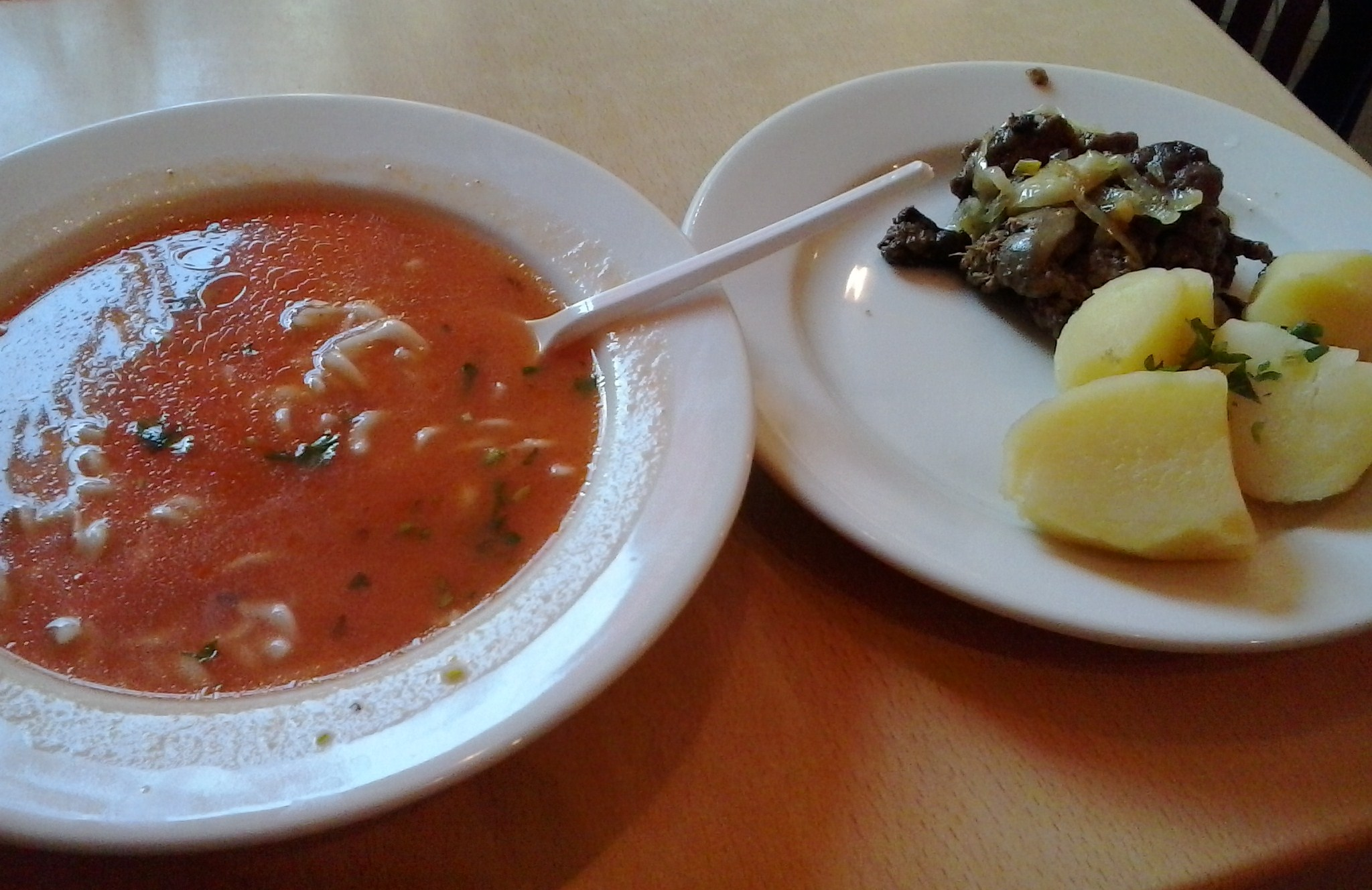
Pig's liver with sauteed onion and tomato soup at a milk bar in Poznań

A bar mleczny (literally "milk bar" in Polish) is a Polish cafeteria which offers nutritious meals, usually traditional Polish cuisine at low cost. Although the idea of this type of establishment has its beginnings in late 19th and early 20th century, it was popularised and developed in the Second Polish Republic in the interwar period, and after the war in the People's Republic of Poland. Similar bars were opened in other countries, including Great Britain and United States, also called 'milk bars' and often offering the same idea: cheap and nutritious meals based on cheap ingredients like milk.

== History ==
The first milk bar, called "Mleczarnia Nadświdrzańska," was established in 1896 in Warsaw by Stanisław Dłużewski, a member of the Polish landed gentry. Although the typical bar mleczny had a menu based on dairy items, these establishments generally served other, non-dairy traditional Polish dishes as well.

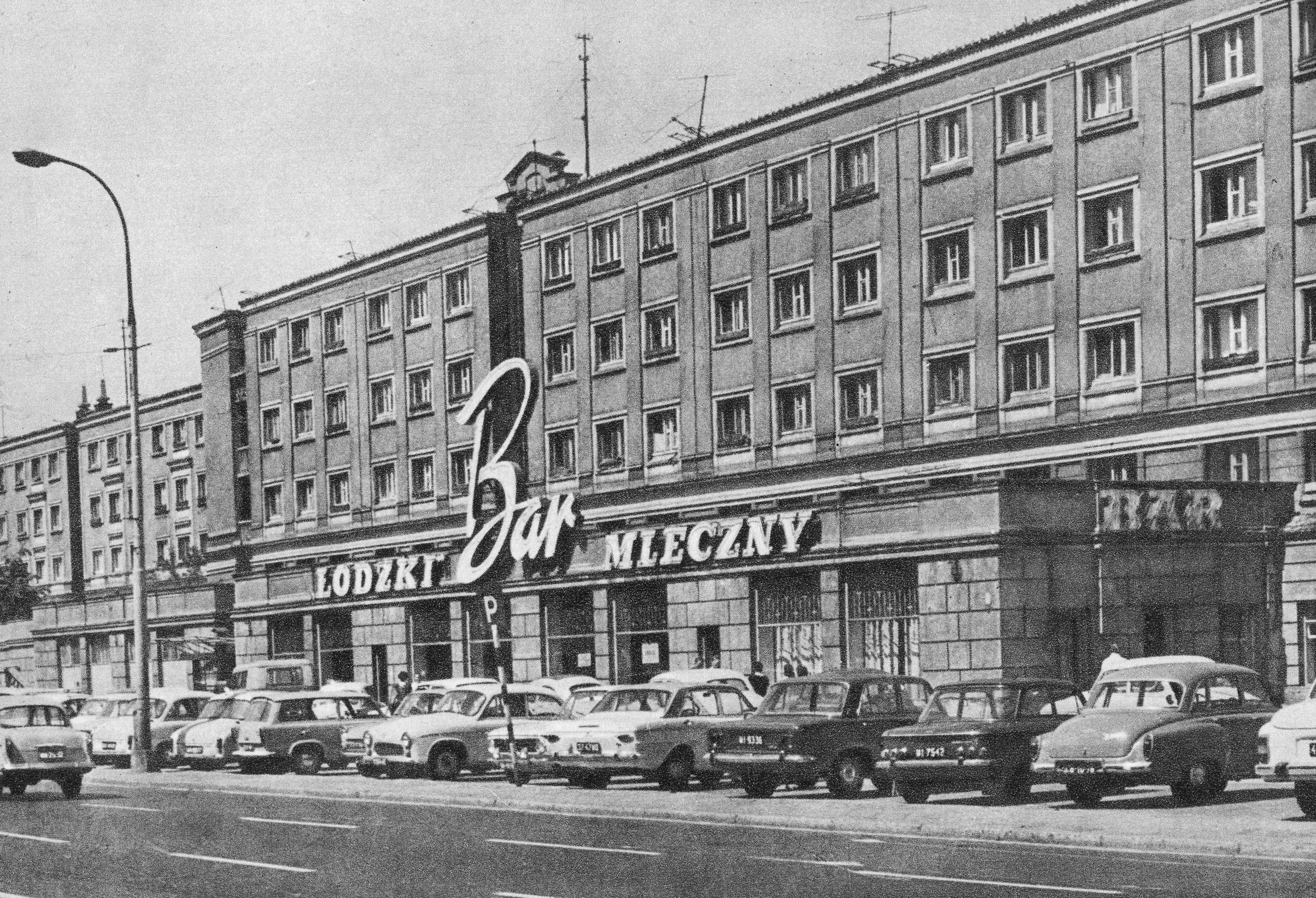
The Łódzki milk bar at Świerczewskiego Avenue 82 (now "Solidarności" Avenue 82) in Warsaw, c. 1971

The commercial success of the first milk bars encouraged other businessmen to copy this type of restaurant. As Poland regained its independence after World War I, milk bars appeared across most of the country. They offered relatively cheap but nourishing food, and thus achieved even more prominence during the economic depression of the 1930s and World War II.

After the fall of Nazi Germany, Poland became a communist state in the Eastern Bloc. Contrary to official propaganda, the majority of the population was poor, and even moderately-priced restaurants were derided as "capitalist". During the post-war years, most restaurants were nationalized and then closed down by the communist authorities.

In 1959, the concept was copied by Communist Yugoslavia, with the first mlečni restoran in Belgrade "Atina" opened on September 10.

In the mid-1960s, milk bars were common as a means of offering cheap meals to people working for companies with no canteen. They still served mostly dairy-based and vegetarian meals, especially during the period of martial law in the early 1980s, when meat was rationed.

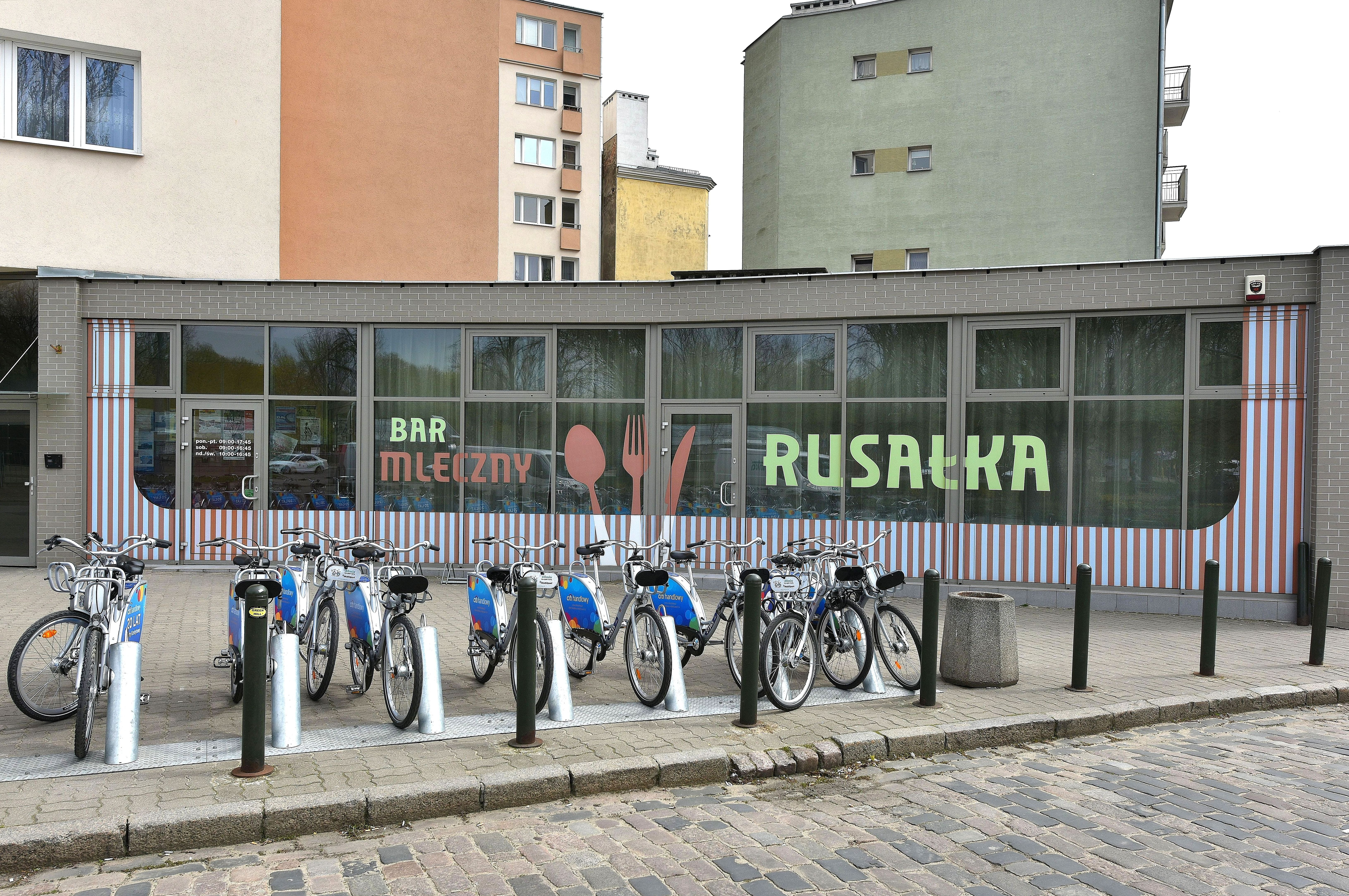
Milk bar at Floriańska 14 in Warsaw

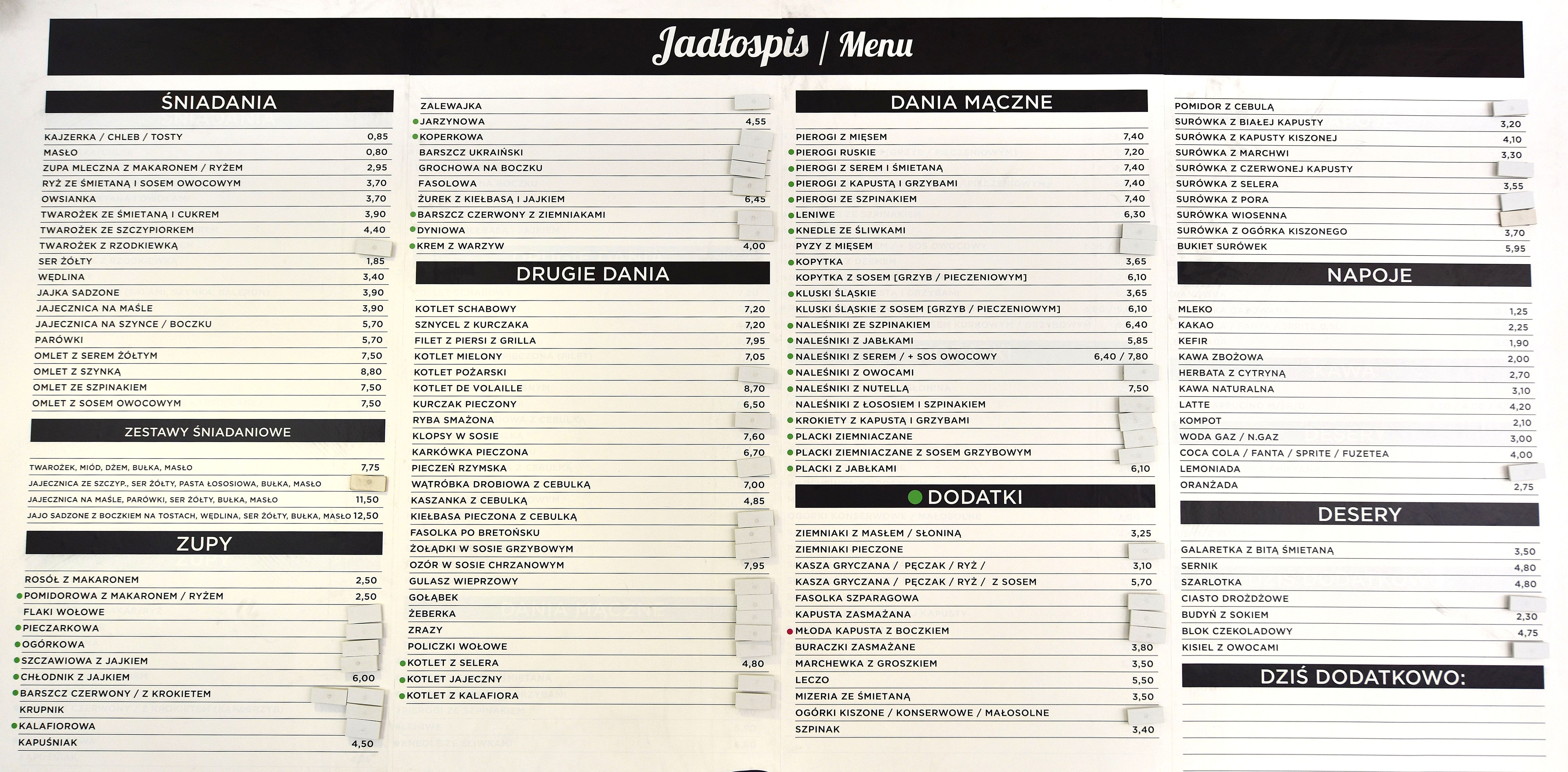
Menu of one of Warsaw's milk bars, 2019

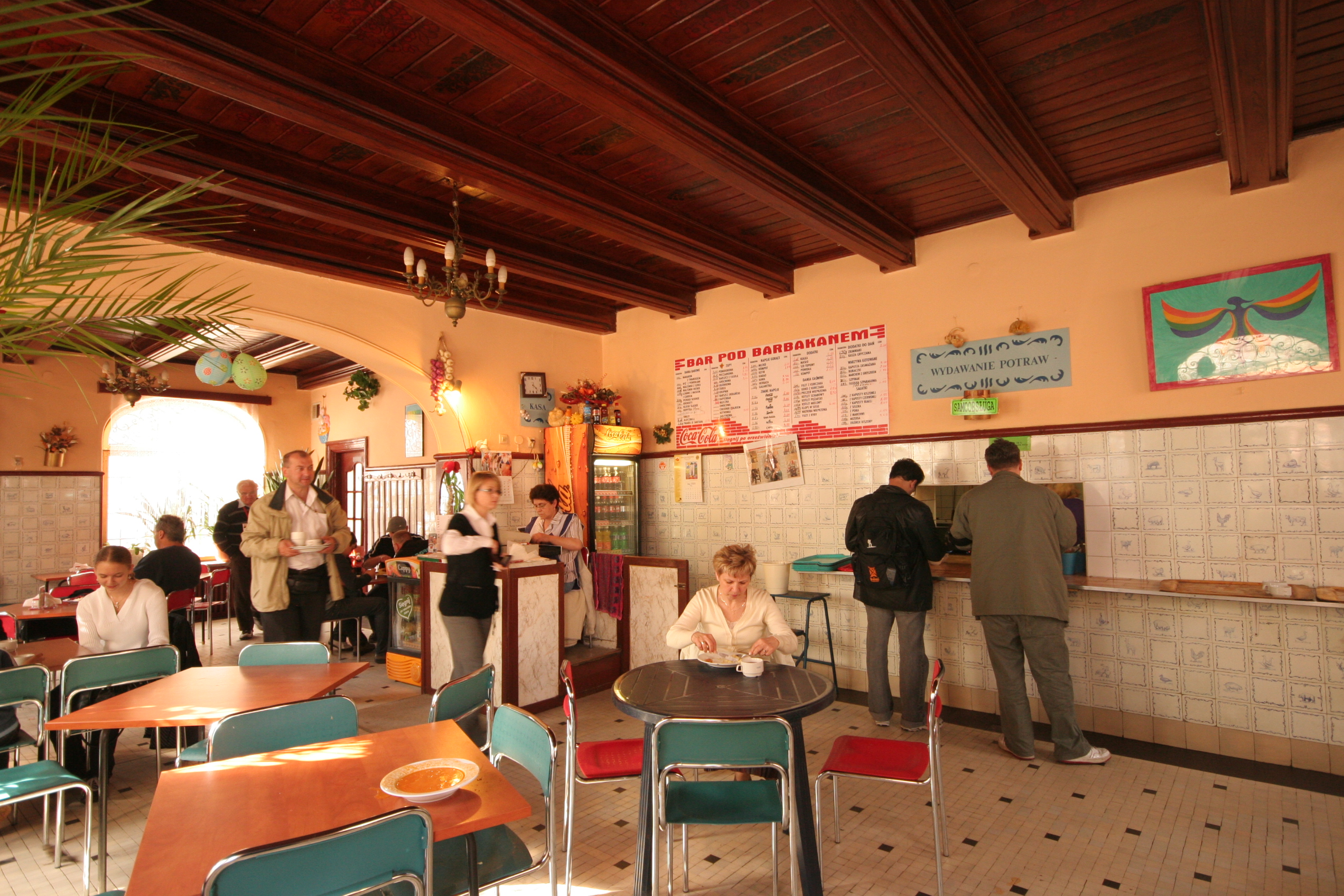
Milk bar near the Warsaw Barbican, 2009

Apart from raw or processed dairy products, milk bars also served egg (omelets or egg cutlets), cereal or flour-based meals such as pierogi. After the fall of the communist system and the end of the centrally planned economy, the majority of milk bars went bankrupt, as they were superseded by regular restaurants. However, some of them were preserved as relics of the communist era welfare state to support the poorer members of Polish society.

In the early 2010s, milk bars began to make a comeback. They became small, inexpensive restaurants that took advantage of PRL nostalgia, while providing good quality food and customer service. Due to their prime physical locations, milk bars often fall victim to gentrification and are defended by activist groups. Today milk bars are privately owned, but partly subsidized by the state, which allows them to offer low prices.

== See also ==
- Polish cuisine
- Greasy spoon
