= David Pugh (MP, born 1789) =

David Pugh (14 August 1789 – 20 April 1861) was a wealthy tea trader, a Welsh landowner and Conservative Party politician who sat in the House of Commons in 1832, and again between 1847 and 1861.

== Career ==
Pugh was a Captain in the Montgomeryshire Yeomanry from 10 December 1819 to 1828, when the regiment was disbanded. When it was reformed in 1831, he was appointed Major; he resigned in 1844.

He was Recorder of Welshpool.

He was High Sheriff of Montgomeryshire in 1823, and Deputy Lieutenant of Montgomeryshire.

He was elected M.P. for the Montgomery Boroughs in 1832, but unseated on petition the next year. In 1847 he was elected, and there being a double return, his opponent's (Hon. Hugh Cholmondeley who had been the sitting member since 1841) return was annulled, 14 February 1848. In 1852, 1857, and 1859 Mr. Pugh was again successively returned. His death in 1861 triggered a by-election.

== Lands and estates ==
He was often described as David Pugh of Llanerchydol, to distinguish him from others of the same name. The 2000-acre estate of Llanerchydol Hall, Welshpool, Powys was the home of the Pugh family from 1776 until 1912 when the estate was split up and sold.

His father built the house in 1776 on the site of an original house which is thought to have been destroyed by fire. In 1820 David Pugh rebuilt the house in the Gothic Revival style introducing the romantic turrets and castellations. Later, in 1848 the architect Thomas Penson was consulted on the drawing room. The family also placed great importance on landscaping the surrounding parkland by employing John Adey Repton. The gardens, including a Japanese water garden and parterre, were introduced along with bold planting of trees in a grand style.

He donated a site in Newtown, Powys for the building of St David's Church.

== Personal ==
David Pugh was the son of Charles Pugh (died 1796) and his wife Jane Lloyd (died 1819). On 11 July 1814 Pugh married, his cousin Anne, only daughter and heiress of Evan Vaughan of Beguildy, Radnorshire. He died 20 April 1861, having had three sons and two daughters, viz.:

- 1. David Pugh, born 24 April 1815, and died 15 September 1857, unmarried.
- 2. Charles Vaughan Pugh of Llanerchydol, born 19 May 1818; married, 28 June 1849, Felicia Harriet, daughter of Capt. Gosling, R.N., and niece to Lady Edwards (who died 2lst August 1874). Sometime a captain in the 90th Light Infantry, and a Deputy-Lieutenant for the co, of Montgomery; unsuccessfully contested the Montgomery Boroughs in 1863. Died 28 December 1874, without issue, whereupon, the Llanerchydol estate devolved upon his elder sister, Margaret Ann.
- 3. Margaret Ann Pugh, married, in September 1856, to John Willes-Johnson, Capt. R.N., of Hannington Hall. Wilts. Elected M.P. for Montgomery Boroughs on the death of his father-in-law, D. Pugh, in 1861. Died 1881.
- 4. Mary Jane Pugh, Died 1869.
- 5. John Cadwalader Pugh, born in 1826; Lieutenant in the Ist, or Royal Regiment. He died on his passage home from Canada with his regiment, 19 July 1851, aged 25 (Memorial in Welshpool church), unmarried.

His descendant, Captain Peter Audley David Arthur Lovell, also became High Sheriff for Montgomeryshire in 1900.

Parliament of the United Kingdom
Preceded by Henry Clive	Member of Parliament for Montgomery Boroughs; 1832–1833	Succeeded by John Edwards
Preceded by Hugh Cholmondeley	Member of Parliament for Montgomery Boroughs; 1847–1861	Succeeded by John Willes-Johnson
