= Pryce Pryce-Jones =

Welsh businessman (1834-1920)

Sir Pryce Pryce-Jones
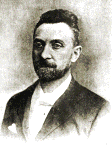
- Sir Pryce Pryce-Jones
- Born: Pryce Jones; 16 October 1834; Llanllwchaiarn, Wales
- Died: 11 January 1920 (aged 85); Newtown, Wales
- Occupation: Businessman
- Political party: Conservative

Sir Pryce Pryce-Jones (16 October 1834 – 11 January 1920) was a Welsh entrepreneur who formed the first mail order business, revolutionising how products were sold. Creating the first mail order catalogues in 1861 – which consisted of woollen goods – for the first time customers could order by post, and the goods were delivered by railway. The BBC summed up his legacy as "The mail order pioneer who started a billion-pound industry".

Pryce-Jones became hugely successful in the United Kingdom where he had over 100,000 customers, which included Florence Nightingale and Queen Victoria. In England he was able to promise next-day delivery. His business also took off overseas, selling Welsh flannel to the rest of Europe, the United States followed by Australia. During the 1870s he took part in exhibitions all over the world, winning several awards, and he became world famous. The Queen knighted him in 1887.

== Early years ==
Pryce-Jones was born in Llanllwchaiarn, just outside Newtown, Montgomeryshire. He left school at 12, and was apprenticed to a local draper, John Davies; he took over Davies's business in 1856. In the same year he married Eleanor Rowley Morris of Newtown. Pryce-Jones started his own little shop selling drapery just off Broad Street. He named it the Royal Welsh Warehouse in 1859, the year the railway came to Newtown. The business flourished. Newtown had always had a woollen industry, and it was the local Welsh flannel which formed the mainstay of Pryce-Jones' business.

== Mail order business ==
"Pryce Jones could only dream of the impact his entrepreneurial vision would have on the world when he was selling Welsh flannel to Queen Victoria and Florence Nightingale in the late 1800s. Jones is credited as being the pioneer of a global mail order industry now worth about £75bn. Forget the internet and delivery drivers, Pryce Jones used the superhighway of the day—the railway and parcel post."

— "The mail order pioneer who started a billion-pound industry", BBC News, December 2020.

Post Office reforms (Uniform Penny Post from 1840) and the arrival of the railways in Newtown helped turn the small rural concern into a company with customers around the globe. Pryce-Jones was the first to sell by mail order on a large scale, dispatching his goods by parcel post and train. He built a warehouse, with its own post office, next to the railway line. Mail order was an ideal way of meeting the needs of customers in isolated rural locations who were either too busy or unable to get into Newtown to shop. The 1861 Pryce Jones catalogue is credited as the world's first mail-order catalogue.

The further expansion of the railways in the years that followed allowed Pryce Jones to take orders from further afield and his business grew rapidly. He built up an impressive list of customers – among them Florence Nightingale as well as Queen Victoria, the Princess of Wales and royal households across Europe. He also began selling Welsh flannel from Newtown to America and Australia, amassing over 200,000 customers.

Pryce-Jones is credited with the invention of the sleeping bag he patented in 1876 under the name of the Euklisia Rug. He exported the product around the world, at one point landing a contract with the Russian Army for 60,000 rugs.

Several times, he was forced to relocate to bigger premises, which was geared to getting goods out "as fast as possible". In 1879, he built the Royal Welsh Warehouse, a tall red brick building in the centre of Newtown which still stands today and which remained home to a mail-order company until 2011, albeit not the original Pryce-Jones company.

By 1880, he had more than 100,000 UK customers and his success was acknowledged by Queen Victoria in 1887 with a knighthood when he became Sir Pryce Pryce-Jones. He was also elected as a Conservative Member of Parliament for Montgomery from 1885 to 1886, and from 1892 to 1895. In 1891, Pryce-Jones became the High Sheriff of Montgomeryshire.

Two of his sons, William Pryce-Jones and Albert Pryce-Jones were international footballers for Wales.

== Death ==
Pryce-Jones died in 1920 at the age of 85. The company he had built up over decades was hit badly by the depression of the 1920s and 1930s and was taken over by Lewis's of Liverpool in 1938.

Parliament of the United Kingdom
Preceded by Frederick Hanbury-Tracy	Member of Parliament for Montgomery; 1885–1886	Succeeded by Frederick Hanbury-Tracy
Preceded by Frederick Hanbury-Tracy	Member of Parliament for Montgomery; 1892–1895	Succeeded by Edward Pryce-Jones
