= Robert William Griffiths =

British farmer and businessman (1896-1962)

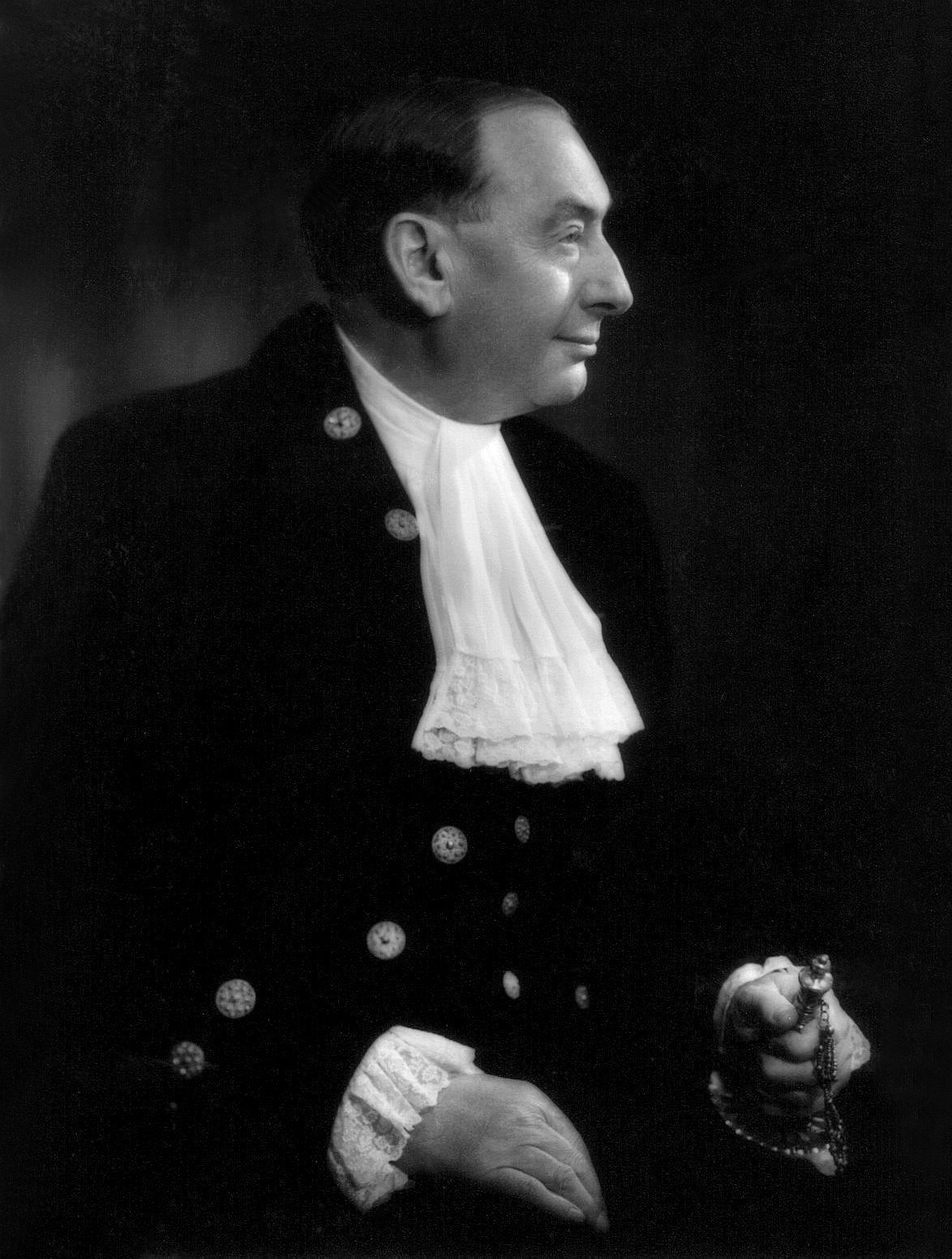
- Portrait as High Sheriff of Montgomeryshire in 1953
- Born: May 28, 1896 Montgomeryshire, Wales
- Died: January 29, 1962 (age:65) London, England
- Occupation: Farmer; businessman; High Sheriff of Montgomeryshire

Robert William Griffiths (May 28, 1896 – January 29, 1962) was a British farmer and businessman whose principal interests lay in dairy farm production in Wales. The Griffiths philosophy was to explore all markets, pinpoint the best and gear production to exploit it. He was appointed High Sheriff of Montgomeryshire in 1953.

== Family ==
The son of Montgomeryshire Councillor Robert Griffiths of Cynhinfa and his wife, Mary Anne Tudor; the eldest of four children. He was descended in an unbroken male line from Brochwel Ysgithrog through the Princes of Powys, Elisedd ap Cyngen and Ieuan, the older brother of Sir Gruffudd Vychan. His family had lived in Montgomeryshire for as long as records are available. His 19th century ancestors were active in the Welsh Methodist revival, one of whom married the Welsh hymn-writer Ann Griffiths. He was educated at Llanfyllin British School and The Oaks Institute, Liverpool. He married Florence Gethin in 1922 with whom he had his only child Barbara in the same year.

== Dairy farming ==
During World War I he started farming a rented 99 acre hill farm at Garthllwyd with six Blue Albion milking cows and a hand-operated separator. As the herd grew, he was unsatisfied by the low price he could get for his milk locally, so started to produce cream that he sold to Harrods in London. In 1926 he moved to a larger farm, Woodlands at Forden, Powys where he renovated the farm buildings and equipment, enlarged his herd, improved their productivity and then expanded further by renting other farms in the area. By 1937 R.W. Griffiths was milking cows on 900 acres (3.6 km^{2}). In the 1950s he bought Woodlands and then the 2,000-acre (8.1 km^{2}) Walcot Estate near Lydbury North from the Earl of Powis, which had come into his family when Robert Clive purchased it on his return from India in 1760.

R.W. Griffiths built up his prize winning Montgomery Herd of tubercular tested pedigree Friesian cows at Woodlands by introducing bulls from as far away as the Netherlands and Canada. To further his pedigree breeding plans he became a partner in one of the first artificial insemination and progeny testing companies in the UK. In 1961 he won the Royal Welsh Agricultural Society's coveted Sir Bryner Jones Memorial Award for an exceptional contribution to dairy farming in Wales.

He was a prominent member of the National Farmer's Union, and a member of the regional Committee of the Milk Marketing Scheme when it was established in the 1930s – later to become Dairy Crest. He was a council member of the Royal Welsh Agricultural Society responsible for the establishment of the permanent grounds for the Royal Welsh Show at Llanelwedd near Builth Wells in mid Wales. Because of his interest in the future of agriculture he became a governor of the University of Wales, Aberystwyth, and a member of the Agricultural Research Council, following one of whose meetings in London he died in 1962.

== National Milk Bars ==
R.W. Griffiths founded Direct TT Supplies Ltd in 1933 to market the milk products of his farms directly to the public through National Milk Bars. The bars had black and white chequered floors, jukeboxes and gleaming chrome fixtures, with stools beside bars selling milk and related products. At the end of World War II he was operating 11 milk bars and the Four Crosses Creamery, Llanymynech – later operated by Dairy Crest. At their height, there were 17 National Milk Bars in North Wales and North West England where 65% of the milk, cream, pigmeat, eggs, bread and confectionery sold came from R.W. Griffiths' bakery, creamery and farm. In the 1960s The Beatles frequented the milk bar in Lime Street, Liverpool and many teenagers followed their example.

== High Sheriff of Montgomeryshire ==
In recognition of his achievements as a farmer and businessman he was appointed High Sheriff of Montgomeryshire in 1953, and was responsible for events in the county relating to the coronation of Queen Elizabeth II.

In 1956 Queen Elizabeth II awarded him the honour of Commander of the Most Venerable Order of the Hospital of St. John of Jerusalem.
