= Richard Herbert (died 1603/1605) =

English politician

Richard Herbert (by 1532 – 1603/5), of Montgomery and Park in Llanwnog, Montgomeryshire, was a Welsh politician.

Herbert was a member of parliament for Montgomery Boroughs in March 1553.
