= Haughton Green =

Coordinates: 53.446°N 2.104°W

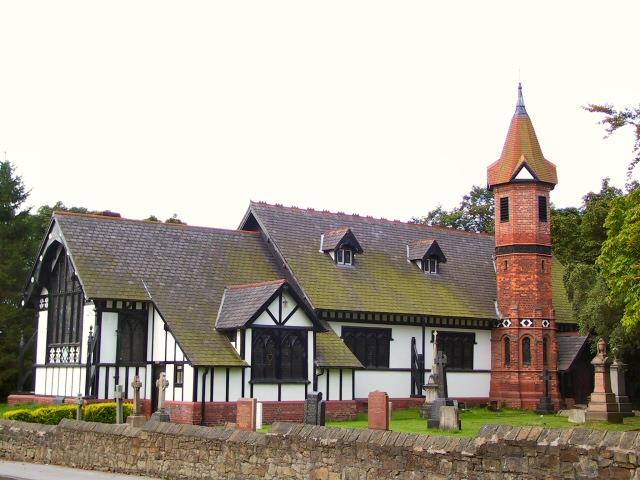
- St.Mary's Church which is a popular landmark in Haughton Green

- Location within Greater Manchester
- Population: Above 9,000
- OS grid reference: SJ925954
- Metropolitan borough: Tameside
- Metropolitan county: Greater Manchester
- Region: North West
- Country: England
- Sovereign state: United Kingdom
- Post town: MANCHESTER
- Postcode district: M34
- Dialling code: 0161
- Police: Greater Manchester
- Fire: Greater Manchester
- Ambulance: North West
- UK Parliament: Gorton and Denton

Haughton Green is a large village in Tameside, Greater Manchester, England. It formed part of the ancient township of Haughton, Lancashire, along with Haughton Dale, Higher Haughton, Lower Haughton, Haughton Hall and Haughton itself.

== History ==
Originally, farming was the main occupation but the discovery of rich deposits of coal brought mining to the area. The soil was not particularly productive and farmers in both Haughton and Denton supplemented their incomes by making felt hats and this industry ultimately dominated the area and made Denton famous for this industry rather than the more usual industries of cotton spinning and weaving.

The Church of St Mary the Virgin was dedicated in March 1876. It was funded and specified by James Walton, father of Frederick Walton the inventor of Linoleum. James owned the Haughton Dale Mill, which despite its name was not a cotton mill, instead providing wire for James' successful carding business. The church has an oak frame with plaster-and-cement walls between. The architects were Medland and Henry Taylor, and the building has a nave with four bays and a south aisle of three bays. A red-brick, octagonal bell tower stands to the side of the main building.

Haughton adopted the Local Government Act, establishing the Haughton Local Board, in 1877 (neighbouring Denton had adopted the Act in 1857). In 1884, the Denton and Haughton Local Boards amalgamated into a single local authority, the Denton and Haughton Local Board. In 1894 this became the Denton Urban District Council, with Haughton being struck out of the formal title by Order of the Lancashire County Council, although the former township still remained as ecclesiastical parishes (Haughton, St Mary the Virgin and Haughton, St Anne). On 1 April 1974, Denton, became part of the Tameside Metropolitan Borough in the metropolitan county of Greater Manchester, England.

== Today ==
Haughton Green is mainly a residential area that has around 3,000 households. Many of the shops and services are located on the main road of the old village, Haughton Green Road, which includes a post office and many other shops.

Haughton Green was mainly a rural area, with most of its built up areas along the main roads and in the original village. It was only at the end of the 19th century and early 20th century that it became more built up and became more so when the Manchester (Beswick) overspill estate was located here in the late fifties behind existing housing on Two Trees Lane. There was also building of new middle class housing in and around the original village at the same time. This increased the size of the village significantly as housing here now extended down into the valley and next to wooded areas.

The village now forms part of the Denton South Ward on Tameside Council and the three local councillors are George Newton, Jack Naylor and Claire Reid. Hannah Spencer is the Member of Parliament for Haughton Green, which is a part of the Gorton and Denton Parliamentary Constituency. Other nearby overspill council estates are Hattersley and Gamesley.

== Education ==
Haughton Green is served by three primary schools:

- Manor Green Primary Academy (previously known as Manor Green Primary and Nursery School)
- St. John Fisher R.C. Primary School
- Corrie Primary and Nursery School

Two Trees High School was the local secondary school, but has since closed.
