= Frederick Hanbury-Tracy =

British politician (1848–1906)

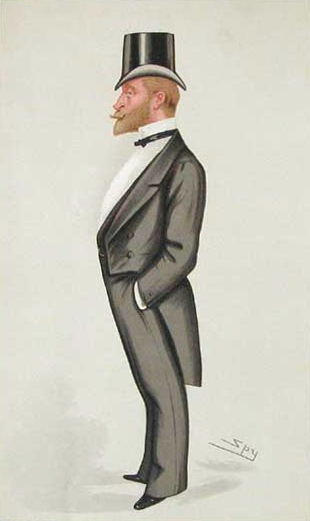
"gentle and liberal" As caricatured by "Spy" (Leslie Ward) in Vanity Fair, 17 May 1884

The Hon. Frederick Stephen Archibald Hanbury-Tracy (15 September 1848 – 9 August 1906), was a British politician.

== Life ==
Hanbury-Tracy was a younger son of Thomas Hanbury-Tracy, 2nd Baron Sudeley, and his wife Emma Elizabeth Alicia, daughter of George Hay Dawkins-Pennant, of Baron Penrhyn's family. Charles Hanbury-Tracy, 4th Baron Sudeley, was his elder brother. He was educated privately and at Trinity College, Cambridge, where he graduated BA. He served as a major in the Worcester Yeomanry, and retired as a lieutenant-colonel.

He succeeded the latter as Member of Parliament for Montgomery in 1877, a seat he held until 1885, and again from 1886 to 1892.

== Family ==
Hanbury-Tracy married in 1870 Helena Caroline Winnington, the only daughter of Sir Thomas Winnington, 4th Baronet by Anna Helena Domville. They had issue:

- Eric Hanbury-Tracy (b1871), and officer in the Coldstream Guards, who married in 1902 Dorothy Greathed, daughter of General Sir Edward Greathed
- Edith Julia Helena Hanbury-Tracy (b1872)
- Cyprienne Emma Madeleine Hanbury-Tracy,OBE (b1874)
- Violet Mary Claudia Hanbury-Tracy (1876-1963), married 1900 Wyndham Dunstan.
- Hilda Adelaide Eleanor Hanbury-Tracy (b1877)
- Gwyneth Rose Coda Hanbury-Tracy (b1879)

He died 9 August 1906, aged 57.

Parliament of the United Kingdom
| Preceded by Charles Hanbury-Tracy | Member of Parliament for Montgomery; 1877–1885 | Succeeded by Pryce Pryce-Jones |
| Preceded by Pryce Pryce-Jones | Member of Parliament for Montgomery; 1886–1892 | Succeeded by Sir Pryce Pryce-Jones |
