= John Bancroft Willans =

Welsh landowner

John Bancroft Willans (1881 - 1957) was an English landowner, historian, photographer and philanthropist

== Early life ==
Willans was born on 27 May 1881 in Liverpool, the only child of John William Willans - the chief engineer of the Liverpool Overhead Railway - and Mary Louisa Willans.

In 1894, Willans' father purchased Dolforgan Hall from the executors of James Walton and Willans moved there with this family.

== War Service ==
During the First World War, Willans served in a non-combat role in Italy.

== Public service ==
Willans was the High Sheriff of Montgomeryshire in 1917, and a Justice of the Peace from 1919.

== Historical research ==
Willans was interested in the history of Wales and the Unitarian Church, of which he was a member. He was a member of the Powysland Club from 1899, rising to become its Chairman in 1957. He was also a member of the Cambrian Archaeological Association from 1901 until his death. He was also a governor of the National Library of Wales and the National Museum of Wales.

== Philanthropy ==
He made significant donations to causes during his lifetime including £11,000 to the University College of Wales and £12,000 to the National Library of Wales. On his death he bequeathed £12,000 to the Unitarian Church.

== Photography ==
Willans was an early and enthusiastic photographer. He was commissioned by the Powysland Club to record scenes throughout Powys. He also recorded the Dolforgan Estate and his extensive travels through Europe. He accompanied archeologist Professor Emyr Estyn Evans on research trips to France and Spain.

In 2005, his collection of photographs was rediscovered and donated to the National Library of Wales at Aberystwyth. The collection was described by local historian David Pugh as "...important in documenting the history of mid Wales a century ago - these photographs have been a great find."

== Death ==
He died on 12 April 1957, aged 76, at the Royal Salop Infirmary in Shrewsbury and was buried in the churchyard of St. Michael's Church in Kerry, Powys near to Dolforgan Hall.

== Works ==
- Willans, John Bancroft (1905). The Byways of Montgomeryshire.
