= James Leche =

16th-century Welsh politician

James Leche (by 1518 – 1553 or 1554) of Newtown, Montgomeryshire, was a Welsh politician.

He was a member (MP) of the parliament of England for Montgomeryshire in 1542.
