= List of Yorkshire railways =

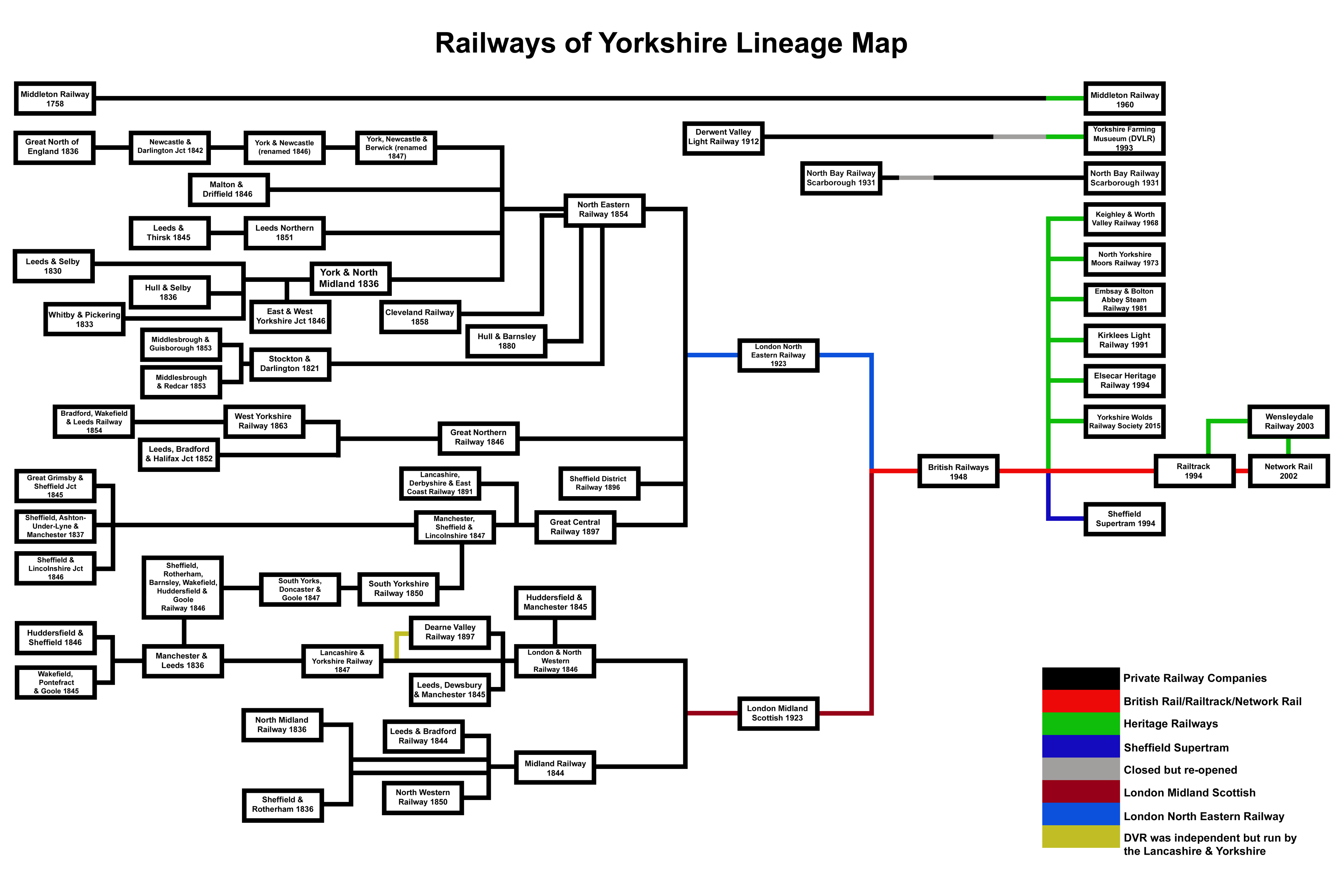
Railways of Yorkshire lineage map.

This is a list of Yorkshire Railways. Most were absorbed by larger railway companies which ended with two of the constituents of The Big Four (London Midland Scottish & London and North Eastern Railway) operating in the Yorkshire & Humber area. These companies were created under the Railways Act 1921 and the act came into effect on 1 January 1923. The Big Four existed for 25 years before being nationalized on 1 January 1948 under the Transport Act 1947.

Some lines escaped being nationalized such as the Derwent Valley Light Railway and the Middleton Railway in Leeds. The latter line's use as a coal railway for the National Coal Board was enough to prevent it being becoming part of the British Rail network.

Privatisation in 1994 onwards has seen the railway ownership pass from British Rail to Railtrack and then onto Network Rail.

Whilst all of these railways are in Yorkshire and the Humber, most of the bigger companies had concerns that stretched far outside of the scope of this list (Midland Railway, Great Central Railway, LNER, etc.) into other regions.

== Standard gauge railways ==
Name of railway	Date opened	Date of transfer to other company	Closure date	Notes
Bradford, Wakefield and Leeds Railway	1858	1865	See comments for routes still open	The railway was renamed the West Yorkshire Railway in 1863 and in 1865 was amalgamated into the Great Northern Railway. This section of line is still open providing services between Leeds and Wakefield Westgate on the Leeds branch of the East Coast Main Line.
Cleveland Railway	1861	1865	See comments for routes still open	The railway ran from Normanby to Loftus. Amalgamated into the NER in 1865, most of the railway has been closed, with a short section now serving freight trains into Skinningrove and Boulby mine.
Dearne Valley Railway	1902–1909 (Note: The line opened in stages between these two dates for mineral traffic)	1922	See comments for routes still open	Although operated by the Lancashire & Yorkshire Railway, the Dearne Valley remained independent until 1922 when it and the L & Y were merged into the London & North Western Railway.
Derwent Valley Light Railway	1913 (Note: The southern part of the line from Cliff Common to Wheldrake opened in 1912, but the official opening is given as 19 July 1913.)		1981 (Note: Whilst the last train ran in 1981, British Rail used the section at Layerthorpe to stable trains. The light railway order was transferred to the heritage group operating at Murton)	Independent for all of its existence, the DVLR was never grouped or nationalised. After British Rail closed the Selby to Driffield railway, the line closed in stages until final complete closure in 1981. The DVLR exists as a small concern at Murton as part of the Museum of Yorkshire Farming.
Easingwold Railway	27 July 1891		27 December 1957	This line was constructed and built at the behest of local businesses. It was never grouped or amalgamated into British Rail and remained independent for its entire existence. Passenger services ceased on 29 November 1948, with goods finally stopping in December 1957.
East & West Yorkshire Junction	1848	1852	See comments for routes still open	Railway built from a spur off the Leeds & Thirsk Railway at Harrogate which extends on through Knaresborough and into York. Absorbed by the York & North Midland Railway in 1852, this line is still open today as the Harrogate to York line.
Elsecar Heritage Railway	1994		Still open	Opened in 1994 on the former South Yorkshire Railway Line that was kept open by British Rail to serve Cortonwood Colliery until 1984.
Embsay and Bolton Abbey Steam Railway	1979		Still open	Opened in 1981 along the former Midland Railway line that once ran from Skipton to Ilkley.
Esholt Sewage Works Railway	1920s		1977	Standard gauge sewage works railway in Esholt, Bradford. Located in the triangle between the Airedale and Wharfedale lines, its engines were unusual in that they were converted to run on wool grease scoured from the waste water from the Bradford woollen industry.
Great Northern Railway	1850	1923	See comments for routes still open	The act approving the Great Northern was passed in 1846. Apart from the direct Leeds to Bradford route via Stanningley (and some link lines) all associated branches of the GNR in Yorkshire have been closed. The northern end of the ECML from Selby was closed by BR in 1983 when they opened their Selby Diversion line.
Great North of England	1841		Still open	Its main line opened in 1841 is now the section of line between York and Darlington on the East Coast Main Line. Amalgamated with the Newcastle and Darlington Junction Railway in 1846.
Guiseley, Yeadon & Rawdon Railway	1894	1923	1964	Line from Rawdon Junction on the Wharfedale line at Guiseley through to Yeadon. The naming of the junction suggests that Rawdon was the eventual aim. The line was taken over by the Midland Railway in 1893, a year before it opened. It never had a regular timetabled service. The line was amalgamated into the LMS in 1923, BR in 1948 and closed completely in 1964.
Hull & Barnsley	1885	1922		The Hull & Barnsley was absorbed into the NER in 1922. The NER was then grouped into the LNER in 1923 some nine months later. All of the railway is now closed save a small section in the Hull area to the docks and another small re-instated section to allow freight trains to serve Drax Power Station.
Hull & Selby	1840		Still open	Became part of the York & North Midland in 1845. Used by Hull Trains, Virgin Trains East Coast, Northern, First Transpennine and freight operators.
Lancashire & Yorkshire	1847		See comments for routes still open	Amalgamated with the London North Western Railway in 1922, before this venture was grouped into the London Midland Scottish in 1923. Most lines of the former L & Y are still open. (Note: Largest portion of closed lines are the branches (eg; Rishworth, Meltham, Holmfirth etc) although most of these were built by other railway companies that became part of the L &Y on the companies merging.)
Leeds, Bradford & Halifax Junction Railway	1855	1865		Section between Leeds and Bradford via Bramley still open. All other former L,B&HJR lines now closed. Merged with Bradford, Wakefield & Leeds Railway to for West Yorkshire Railway in 1863. West Yorkshire Railway amalgamated into the Great Northern Railway in 1865.
Leeds & Bradford Railway	1846		Still open	Became part of the Midland Railway in 1853. Was the first railway to reach Bradford. Leeds and Bradford Extension was laid in 1848 to extend to Colne via Skipton.
Leeds & Selby	1834		Still open	Was absorbed by the York & North Midland. Line is still in use primarily as the Trans Pennine line between Hull, Leeds, Manchester and Liverpool
Leeds & Thirsk	1848		Still open (partial)	Became Leeds Northern Railway in 1852 and then was absorbed into the North Eastern Railway in 1854. Sections from Leeds to Pannal/Harrogate and Northallerton to Stockton still open. All other sections and associated branches have been closed.
Malton & Driffield Railway	1853	1854	1958	Closure casualty before Beeching. Absorbed by the North Eastern Railway in 1854. Small section at Fimber has been re-opened as the Yorkshire Wolds Railway.
Manchester, Sheffield and Lincolnshire	1847	1897	See comments for routes still open	Formed by the amalgamation of the Great Grimsby & Sheffield Junction Railway, Sheffield, Ashton-Under-Lyne and Manchester Railway and the Sheffield & Lincolnshire Junction Railway. Renamed as the Great Central Railway when the London Extension to Marylebone was opened.
Middlesbrough & Guisborough	1853	1857	See comments for routes still open	The line was promoted by the Stockton & Darlington Railway and remained independent until 1857 when the S & D took it over (which was itself amalgamated into the NER in 1863). Whilst some of the line was closed by 1964, the western section now forms part of the Esk Valley Line between Middlesbrough & Marton.
Middleton Railway	1758		Still open	Recognised as the oldest railway still in use. The line was never nationalized in 1948 as it was a coal line of the then NCB. It is also notable as being the first standard gauge line to be run by volunteers (1960).
North Eastern Railway	1854		Still open, some closed lines	The NER was created from the York, Newcastle & Berwick, the York and North Midland and the Leeds Northern Railway. Other lines followed in the intervening years until the NER was absorbed into the London & North Eastern Railway in 1923 under the Railways Act 1921.
North Yorkshire Moors Railway	1973		Still open	Former Whitby & Pickering Railway re-opened as a heritage railway. Section retained between Grosmont and Pickering, though NYMR now has permission to run trains on to Whitby.
Scarborough & Whitby Railway	1885	1898	1965	After several abortive attempts, the railway was finally opened in 1885 and was operated by the NER who took full control in 1898. It was closed completely in 1965 with two short sections staying open at the extreme northern and southern ends until 1974 and 1985 respectively.
South Yorkshire Railway	1850	1864	See comments for routes still open	Initially petitioned in Parliament as the South Yorkshire, Doncaster & Goole Railway, by 1847 it was just simply the South Yorkshire Railway. It became a constituent part of the Manchester, Sheffield & Lincolnshire Railway in 1850. Much of the collieries and branches it served have been closed, but two major sections remain open - Doncaster to Keadby and Doncaster to Swinton
Spurn Point Military Railway	1915	1951	Closed completely	Standard gauge military railway that extended for 3.75 miles (6.04 km) along the Spurn Peninsula from Kilnsea to Spurn Point. The railway was built to supply the fortifications along the Spurn peninsula with supplies being brought in by ship from a special jetty at Spurn Point and being railed up to Kilnsea. The line was closed before the peninsula was de-militarised. The line was never grouped or nationalised.
Wakefield, Pontefract & Goole Railway	1848	1847	See comments for routes still open	Started out as the Wakefield, Pontefract & Goole Railway as an act in 1845. By the time it was completed in 1847, it was part of the Lancashire & Yorkshire railway. The route is still open and carries a passenger service to Goole as well as an intensive coal and biomass service to the Aire Valley Power Stations.
Wensleydale Railway	2003		Still open	Wensleydale Railway leased the railway for 99 years from Network Rail after negotiating with Railtrack in 2002. Line runs from Castle Hills Junction in Northallerton to Redmire, North Yorkshire and is on the former York, Newcastle & Berwick Railway's Bedale Branch and North Eastern Railway Line between Northallerton & Hawes. (Note: The line carried on from Hawes to connect with Garsdale station on the Settle & Carlisle line. This was a Midland Railway venture but at the time was in the West Riding of Yorkshire.)
Whitby & Pickering	1836	1854	Mostly closed in 1965 (Note: Section between Whitby and Grosmont is now part of the Esk Valley Line. North York Moors Railway now have permission to run trains on the Network Rail section between Grosmont & Whitby.)	Became part of the York and North Midland in 1854 and was absorbed into the NER. Grosmont to Pickering (and thence to Malton) section closed in 1965. Re-opened in 1973 as North Yorkshire Moors Railway between Grosmont and Pickering.
Whitby, Redcar & Middlesbrough Union Railway	1883	1889	1958	Opened with financial help from the NER after a section along the cliff face at Kettleness collapsed. The entire line was taken over by the NER in 1889. Closed in 1958, (except for Whitby West Cliff, which stayed open until 1965) a short section was re-opened in 1974 to serve Boulby potash mine.
York & North Midland Railway	1839	1854		Opened in 1839 connecting York with Leeds and Selby, the Y&NMR flourished under George Hudson, but due to financial irregularities, it merged with Leeds Northern, York, Newcastle & Berwick and the Malton & Driffield to become the North Eastern Railway in 1854.

== Narrow gauge railways ==
Name of railway	Gauge	Date opened	Date closed	Comments
Abbey Light Railway, Kirkstall	24 inches (610 mm)	1976	2013	Former railway that ran in the grounds of Kirkstall Abbey in Leeds. Closed down in 2013, following the death of the owner/operator/engineer the year before.
Armley Mills Museum, Leeds	18 inches (460 mm)			Dual gauge line within the industrial museum.
Cedarbarn Railway, Pickering	7.25 inches (184 mm)	2016		Circular track on a fruit picking farm
Golden Acre Park Miniature Railway	20 inches (510 mm)	1932	1938	Railway line laid out as a straight out and back line, but with extensions became a circular passenger carrying line around the lake on the Golden Acre Park estate (Bramhope). The line closed because the business failed.
Harrogate Gasworks Railway	24 inches (610 mm)	1907	1957	Railway connected to the NER at New Bilton for the transportation of coal.
Keighley & District Model Engineering Society Marley Railway (KDMES), Keighley	3.5 inches (89 mm); 5 inches (130 mm)		Still open	Track runs for 0.5 miles (0.8 km) in Marley Park in Keighley.
Kirklees Light Railway	15 inches (380 mm)	1991	Still open	Built on the former Clayton West Branch in West Yorkshire. Standard gauge line converted to run narrow gauge trains.
Newby Hall Railway	10.25 inches (260 mm)	1971	Still open	Originally an end to end line, it now extends around a stately home with a loop to go in a constant circle.
North Bay Railway, Scarborough	20 inches (510 mm)	1931	Still open	Closed during the Second World War, this railway runs for 3/4 mile along the coast in Scarborough's North Bay.
Northcliff Railway, Bradford (Note: There are various spellings of the name, but Northcliffe is prevalent. The Bradford Model Engineering Society do have a station called 'Bradford Northcliff'.)	3.5 inches (89 mm); 5 inches (130 mm); 7.25 inches (184 mm)	1940/1966	Still open	Bradford Model Engineering society's display and ride on line in Northcliffe Park, Shipley. Open for public rides during the summer.
Poppleton Community Railway Nursery	24 inches (610 mm)	1941	Still open (Note: Railway was abandoned in the 1990s but was taken up again by a group of volunteers who lease the site from Network Rail.)	Last nursery railway in Britain. Was abandoned during privatisation era but a group of volunteers are in the process of restoring it.
Ruswarp Miniature Railway	7.25 inches (184 mm)	1990	Still open	Circular route that follows the banks of the River Esk in North Yorkshire
Sand Hutton Light Railway	15 inches (380 mm) (1913–1922); 18 inches (460 mm) (1922–1932)	1913	1932	Originally a 15-inch (380 mm) railway opened in stages from 1913 onwards to serve the estate of Sir Robert Walker in Sand Hutton, North Yorkshire. When the railway was extended to Warthill railway station on the York–Beverley line, extra stock was acquired from a closed railway in London which had an 18-inch (460 mm) gauge. This necessitated converting the gauge on the line and this was accomplished in stages between 1920 and 1922.
Saltburn Miniature Railway	15 inches (380 mm)	1947	Still open	Tourist railway that runs inland from the beach for a distance of 0.5 miles (0.80 km)
Shipley Glen Tramway	20 inches (510 mm)	1895	Still open	Tramway that connects valley bottom to near top of northern side of Aire Valley between Shipley and Baildon in West Yorkshire.
Wolds Way Lavender Farm, Winteringham	7.25 inches (184 mm)		Still open	Used for transporting logs, lavender and passengers around the lavender farm surroundings.
York Miniature Railway Ride	7.25 inches (184 mm)		Still open	Paid for railway ride in the south yard of the National Railway Museum in York. Line runs for 800 yards (730 m).

== See also ==
- Category: Rail transport in North Yorkshire
- Category: Rail transport in the East Riding of Yorkshire
- Category: Rail transport in South Yorkshire
- Category: Rail transport in West Yorkshire
