= Dolforgan Hall =

Manor house in Powys, Wales

Dolforgan Hall is a large manor house near Kerry, Powys.

== Early history ==
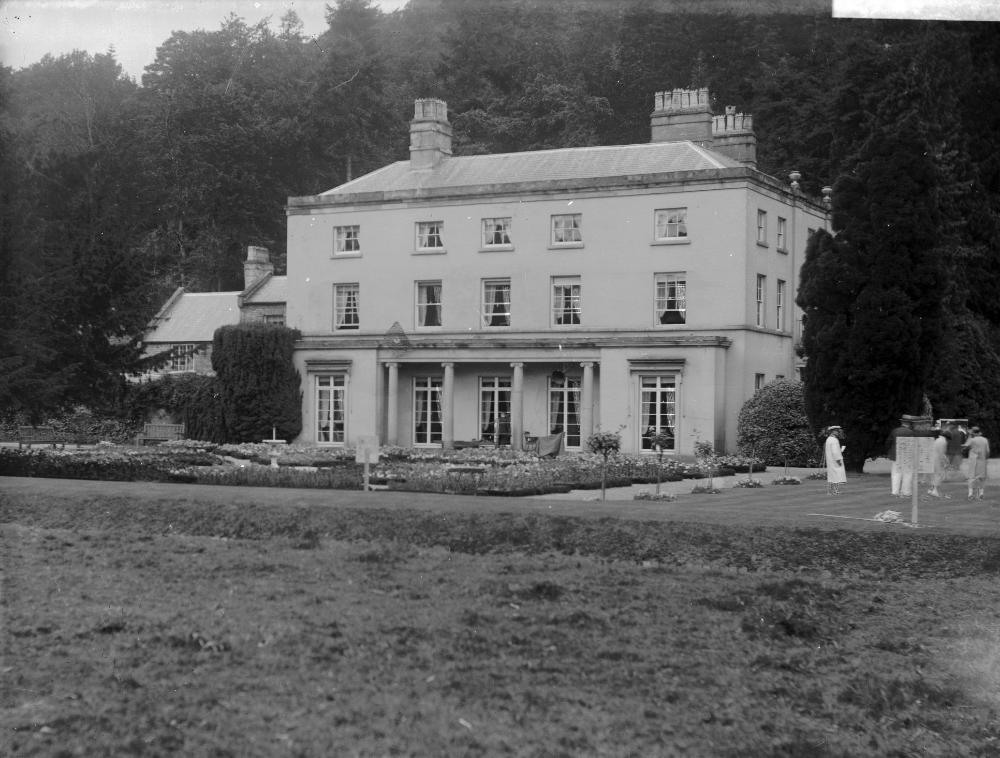

A manor house was first built at Dolforgan in the 17th century, as the residence of the Fox family. In the middle of the 17th century the house was purchased by the Herbert family. Between 1790 and 1800, the house was extensively rebuilt and extended by John Herbert, essentially creating a new house. This new hall may have been designed by architect John Johnson. Some remains of the earlier building were left at the rear of the house.

Between 1807 and 1818, an iron bridge was built to carry the main drive to the house. This is one of the earliest iron bridges in the world.

== Victorian era ==
In 1846, Walter Long married 21-year-old Harriet Avarina Brunetta Herbert, the only daughter of Captain John Owen Herbert, the owner of Dolforgan. Harriet died the following year as a result of complications during childbirth, and Walter died three months later, some say of a broken heart. Dolforgan passed to Walter's brother Richard Penruddocke Long in 1867.

In 1868, James Walton purchased the Dolforgan Estate which included the Hall and 4,250 acres (17.2 km^{2}) of land to the north-west of Kerry. Walton moved into the Hall in 1870, and it was his primary residence until his death in 1883. Walton was also a High Sheriff of Montgomeryshire.

In 1894, after Walton's death, Dolforgan was sold to John William Willans, the Chief Engineer of the Liverpool Overhead Railway. He died unexpectedly in 1895, and the estate passed to his son John Bancroft Willans.

== Modern history ==
John Bancroft Willans inherited the Hall and his father's significant wealth. He lived at Dolforgan until his death in 1957. J. B. Willans was a historian and photographer, and made an extensive photographic record of Dolforgan, which is now in the National Library of Wales.

After Willans' death, Dolforgan was bought by the Jones family, who still own it. The Hall is currently divided into five flats. It is a Grade II* listed building

During the early part of the 1940s to the end of World War II, Dolforgan Hall became a refuge for children to escape the bombing of London. One of those children, Rosemary Daykin, recounted, "I was only five at that time and I had planted a little tree in a pot to show Mr. Willans. He took me by the hand and walked me around to the treed hill behind the Hall to see the redwood trees, the same type I had in my pot. He said remember the limbs of the tree are your arms, the trunk is like your body, and the name is the color of your cardigan. I have not forgotten."

== Description ==
The hall has a three-storey Regency style facade. The entrance has two full-height pilasters, and four columns holding up an ionic porch. There is a Gothic style sawmill on the grounds.
