= Montgomery (UK Parliament constituency) =

UK Parliament constituency (1801–1918)

- Former constituency for the House of Commons

1542–1918
- Seats: one
- Replaced by: Montgomeryshire

Montgomery was a constituency in the House of Commons of England, House of Commons of Great Britain and later in the House of Commons of the Parliament of the United Kingdom. It elected one MP, but was abolished in 1918.

After 1832 the constituency was more usually called the Montgomery Boroughs or Montgomery District of Boroughs.

== Boundaries ==
=== 1885–1918 ===
The constituency comprised the boroughs of Montgomery, Llanfyllin, Llanidloes, Newtown and Welshpool.

== Members of Parliament ==
=== 1542–1640 ===
Parliament	Member
1542	William Herbert II
1545	William Herbert II
1547	William Herbert II
1553 (Mar)	Richard Herbert
1553 (Oct)	John ap Edmund
1554 (Apr)	Richard Lloyd
1554 (Nov)	Richard Lloyd
1555	not known
1558	William Herbert II
1559	John Man
1562/3	John Price
1571	Arthur Price
1572	Rowland Pugh, thought to be dead repl. 1581 by Richard Herbert I
1584	Richard Herbert II
1586	Matthew Herbert
1588	Rowland Pugh
1593	Richard Morgan
1597	Thomas Jukes
1601	John Harris

=== 1601–1918 ===
Election	Member	Party
1601	John Harris	
1604–1611	Edward Whittingham	
1614	Sir John Danvers	
1621–1622:	Edward Herbert	
1624	George Herbert	
1625	George Herbert	
1626	Sir Henry Herbert	
1628	Sir Richard Lloyd	
November 1640	Richard Herbert	Royalist
September 1642	Herbert disabled from sitting – seat vacant	
1646	George Devereux	
1653	Not represented in the Barebones Parliament and the First and Second Parliaments of the Protectorate	
January 1659	Charles Lloyd	
May 1659	Not represented in the restored Rump	
April 1660	(Sir) Thomas Myddelton	
1661	John Purcell	
1665	Henry Herbert	
1679	Matthew Pryce	
April 1685	William Williams	
July 1685	Charles Herbert	
1691	Price Devereux	
1701	John Vaughan	
1705	Charles Mason	
1708	John Pugh	
1727	(Sir) William Corbet	
1741	James Cholmondeley	
1747	Henry Herbert	
1748	Francis Herbert	
1754	William Bodvell	
1759	Richard Clive	
1771	Captain Frederick Cornewall	
1774	Whitshed Keene	
1818	Henry Clive	Tory
1832	David Pugh	Tory
1833 by-election	John Edwards	Whig
1841	Hon. Hugh Cholmondeley	Conservative
1847	David Pugh	Conservative
1861 by-election	John Willes-Johnson	Conservative
1863 by-election	Hon. Charles Hanbury-Tracy	Liberal
1877 by-election	Hon. Frederick Hanbury-Tracy	Liberal
1885	Pryce Pryce-Jones	Conservative
1886	Hon. Frederick Hanbury-Tracy	Liberal
1892	Sir Pryce Pryce-Jones	Conservative
1895	Major Edward Pryce-Jones	Conservative
1906	John Rees	Liberal
Dec 1910	Colonel Edward Pryce-Jones	Conservative

== Elections ==
=== Elections in the 1830s ===
General election 1830: Montgomery Boroughs
Party	Candidate	Votes	%
Tory	Henry Clive (MP)	Unopposed	
Registered electors		c. 135	
Tory hold			

General election 1831: Montgomery Boroughs
Party	Candidate	Votes	%
Tory	Henry Clive (MP)	Unopposed	
Registered electors		c. 135	
Tory hold			

General election 1832: Montgomery Boroughs
Party	Candidate	Votes	%
Tory	David Pugh	335	51.1
Whig	John Edwards	321	48.9
Majority		14	2.2
Turnout		656	90.7
Registered electors		723	
Tory hold			

The election was declared void on petition, causing a by-election.

By-election, 8 April 1833: Montgomery Boroughs
Party	Candidate	Votes	%	±%
Whig	John Edwards	331	50.8	+1.9
Tory	Panton Corbett	321	49.2	−1.9
Majority		10	1.6	N/A
Turnout		652	90.2	−0.5
Registered electors		723		
Whig gain from Tory		Swing	+1.9	

General election 1835: Montgomery Boroughs
Party	Candidate	Votes	%
Whig	John Edwards	Unopposed	
Registered electors		899	
Whig gain from Conservative			

General election 1837: Montgomery Boroughs
Party	Candidate	Votes	%
Whig	John Edwards	472	51.6
Conservative	Panton Corbett	443	48.4
Majority		29	3.2
Turnout		915	88.2
Registered electors		1,037	
Whig hold			

=== Elections in the 1840s ===
General election 1841: Montgomery Boroughs
Party	Candidate	Votes	%	±%
Conservative	Hugh Cholmondeley	464	51.5	+3.1
Whig	John Edwards	437	48.5	−3.1
Majority		27	3.0	N/A
Turnout		901	90.6	+2.4
Registered electors		995		
Conservative gain from Whig		Swing	+3.1	

General election 1847: Montgomery Boroughs
Party	Candidate	Votes	%	±%
Conservative	David Pugh	389	50.0	N/A
Conservative	Hugh Cholmondeley	389	50.0	−1.5
Majority		0	0.0	N/A
Turnout		778	79.2	−11.4
Registered electors		982		
Conservative hold		Swing	N/A	

With both Cholmondeley and Pugh receiving the same number of votes, both were declared elected by the returning officer. However, Cholmondeley decided against defending his claim for the seat and Pugh was declared the only elected candidate.

=== Elections in the 1850s ===
General election 1852: Montgomery Boroughs
Party	Candidate	Votes	%	±%
Conservative	David Pugh	435	59.2	+9.2
Radical	George Hammond Whalley	300	40.8	New
Majority		135	18.4	+18.4
Turnout		735	73.3	−5.9
Registered electors		1,003		
Conservative hold				

General election 1857: Montgomery Boroughs
Party	Candidate	Votes	%	±%
Conservative	David Pugh	Unopposed		
Registered electors		927		
Conservative hold				

General election 1859: Montgomery Boroughs
Party	Candidate	Votes	%	±%
Conservative	David Pugh	Unopposed		
Registered electors		900		
Conservative hold				

=== Elections in the 1860s ===
Pugh's death caused a by-election.

By-election, 4 May 1861: Montgomery Boroughs
Party	Candidate	Votes	%	±%
Conservative	John Willes-Johnson	Unopposed		
Conservative hold				

Willes-Johnson's death caused a by-election.

By-election, 20 August 1863: Montgomery Boroughs
Party	Candidate	Votes	%	±%
Liberal	Charles Hanbury-Tracy	439	57.1	New
Conservative	Charles Vaughan Pugh	330	42.9	N/A
Majority		109	14.2	N/A
Turnout		769	82.4	N/A
Registered electors		933		
Liberal gain from Conservative				

General election 1865: Montgomery Boroughs
Party	Candidate	Votes	%	±%
Liberal	Charles Hanbury-Tracy	437	54.0	N/A
Conservative	Thomas Lewis Hampton	372	46.0	N/A
Majority		65	8.0	N/A
Turnout		809	83.8	N/A
Registered electors		965		
Liberal gain from Conservative				

General election 1868: Montgomery Boroughs
Party	Candidate	Votes	%	±%
Liberal	Charles Hanbury-Tracy	Unopposed		
Registered electors		2,559		
Liberal hold				

=== Elections in the 1870s ===
General election 1874: Montgomery Boroughs
Party	Candidate	Votes	%	±%
Liberal	Charles Hanbury-Tracy	Unopposed		
Registered electors		2,839		
Liberal hold				

Hanbury-Tracy succeeded to the peerage, becoming Lord Sudeley.

By-election, 17 May 1877: Montgomery Boroughs
Party	Candidate	Votes	%	±%
Liberal	Frederick Hanbury-Tracy	1,447	56.4	N/A
Conservative	Charles Vane-Tempest	1,118	43.6	New
Majority		329	12.8	N/A
Turnout		2,565	88.0	N/A
Registered electors		2,914		
Liberal hold		Swing	N/A	

=== Elections in the 1880s ===
General election 1880: Montgomery Boroughs
Party	Candidate	Votes	%	±%
Liberal	Frederick Hanbury-Tracy	1,572	56.5	N/A
Conservative	Pryce Pryce-Jones	1,211	43.5	N/A
Majority		361	13.0	N/A
Turnout		2,783	89.2	N/A
Registered electors		3,120		
Liberal hold		Swing	N/A	

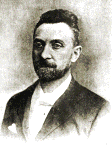
Pryce-Jones

General election 1885: Montgomery Boroughs
Party	Candidate	Votes	%	±%
Conservative	Pryce Pryce-Jones	1,409	51.5	+8.0
Liberal	Frederick Hanbury-Tracy	1,326	48.5	−8.0
Majority		83	3.0	N/A
Turnout		2,735	91.2	+2.0
Registered electors		2,999		
Conservative gain from Liberal		Swing	+8.0	

General election 1886: Montgomery Boroughs
Party	Candidate	Votes	%	±%
Liberal	Frederick Hanbury-Tracy	1,424	53.2	+4.7
Conservative	Pryce Pryce-Jones	1,251	46.8	−4.7
Majority		173	6.4	N/A
Turnout		2,675	89.2	−2.0
Registered electors		2,999		
Liberal gain from Conservative		Swing	+4.7	

=== Elections in the 1890s ===
General election 1892: Montgomery Boroughs
Party	Candidate	Votes	%	±%
Conservative	Pryce Pryce-Jones	1,406	52.2	+5.4
Liberal	Frederick Hanbury-Tracy	1,288	47.8	−5.4
Majority		118	4.4	N/A
Turnout		2,694	91.8	+2.6
Registered electors		2,936		
Conservative gain from Liberal		Swing		

Philipps

General election 1895: Montgomery Boroughs
Party	Candidate	Votes	%	±%
Conservative	Edward Pryce-Jones	1,435	51.5	−0.7
Liberal	Owen Philipps	1,351	48.5	+0.7
Majority		84	3.0	−1.4
Turnout		2,786	91.9	+0.1
Registered electors		3,030		
Conservative hold		Swing	−0.7	

=== Elections in the 1900s ===
General election 1900: Montgomery Boroughs
Party	Candidate	Votes	%	±%
Conservative	Edward Pryce-Jones	1,478	53.0	+1.5
Liberal	John Albert Bright	1,309	47.0	−1.5
Majority		169	6.0	+3.0
Turnout		2,787	86.3	−5.6
Registered electors		3,229		
Conservative hold		Swing	+1.5	

Rees

General election 1906: Montgomery Boroughs
Party	Candidate	Votes	%	±%
Liberal	John Rees	1,541	51.4	+4.4
Conservative	Edward Pryce-Jones	1,458	48.6	−4.4
Majority		83	2.8	N/A
Turnout		2,999	90.5	+4.2
Registered electors		3,313		
Liberal gain from Conservative		Swing	+4.4	

=== Elections in the 1910s ===
General election January 1910: Montgomery Boroughs
Party	Candidate	Votes	%	±%
Liberal	John Rees	1,539	50.2	−1.2
Conservative	Edward Pryce-Jones	1,526	49.8	+1.2
Majority		13	0.4	−2.4
Turnout		3,065	91.4	+0.9
Registered electors		3,354		
Liberal hold		Swing	−1.2	

General election December 1910: Montgomery Boroughs
Party	Candidate	Votes	%	±%
Conservative	Edward Pryce-Jones	1,522	50.9	+1.1
Liberal	A. E. O. Humphreys-Owen	1,468	49.1	−1.1
Majority		54	1.8	N/A
Turnout		2,990	89.1	−2.3
Registered electors		3,354		
Conservative gain from Liberal		Swing	+1.1	

General Election 1914/15:

Another General Election was required to take place before the end of 1915. The political parties had been making preparations for an election to take place and by July 1914, the following candidates had been selected;

- Unionist: Edward Pryce-Jones
- Liberal: A E O Humphreys Owen
