= Tracy (name) =

- Pronunciation: /ˈtreɪsi/
- Gender: Unisex
- Language: English

Origin
- Languages: Old French, Old English, Old Irish, Norman
- Origin: Tracy (surname); hypocorism for Teresa
- Region of origin: England, France, Ireland

Other names
- Variant forms: Tracey; Tracie; Traci; Tracee; Tracci; Treacy; Trasci
- Short form: Trace
- Related names: Teresa, Theresa

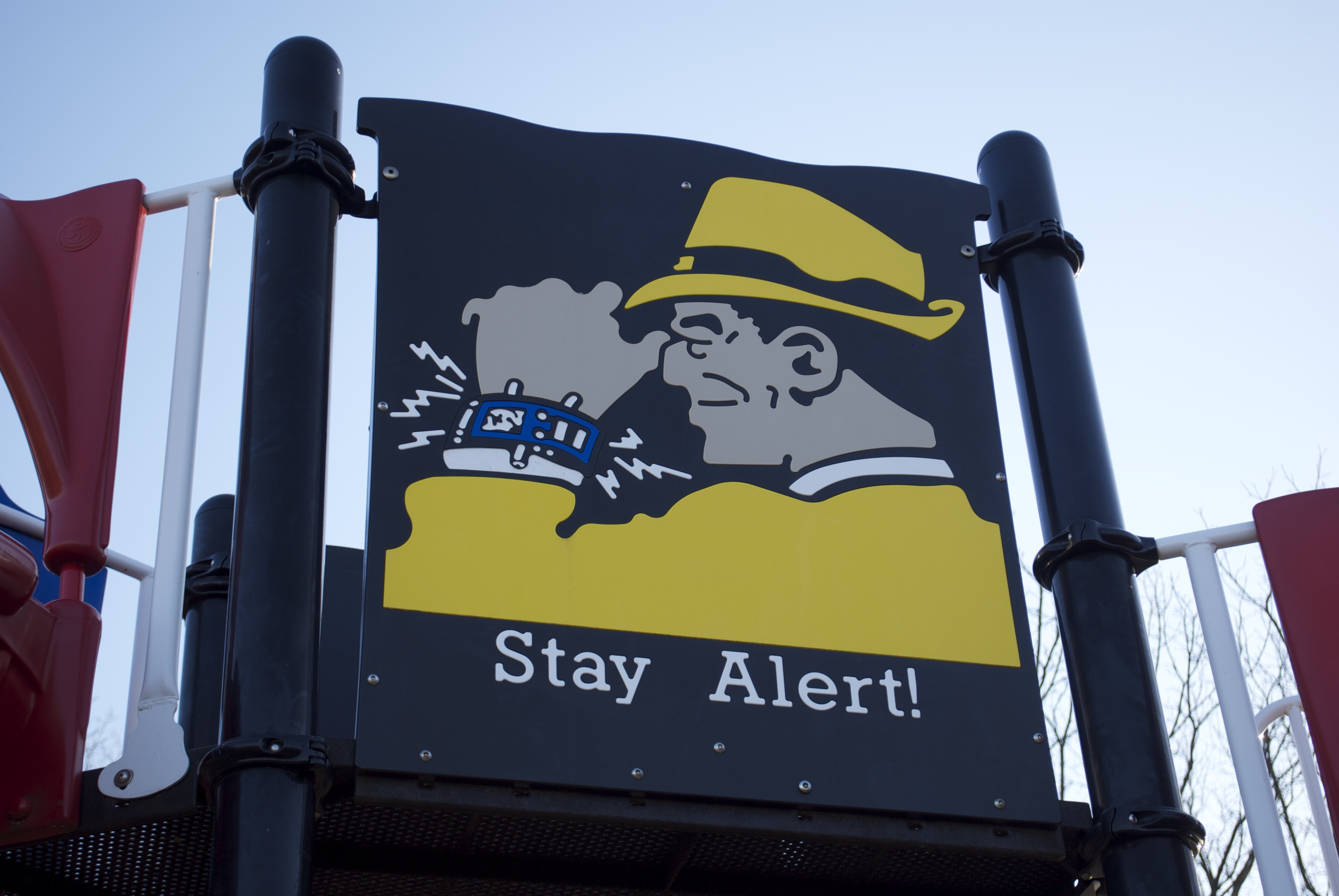
A park sign depicting Dick Tracy, a fictional police detective in the American comic strip Dick Tracy, which has been in syndication since 1931.

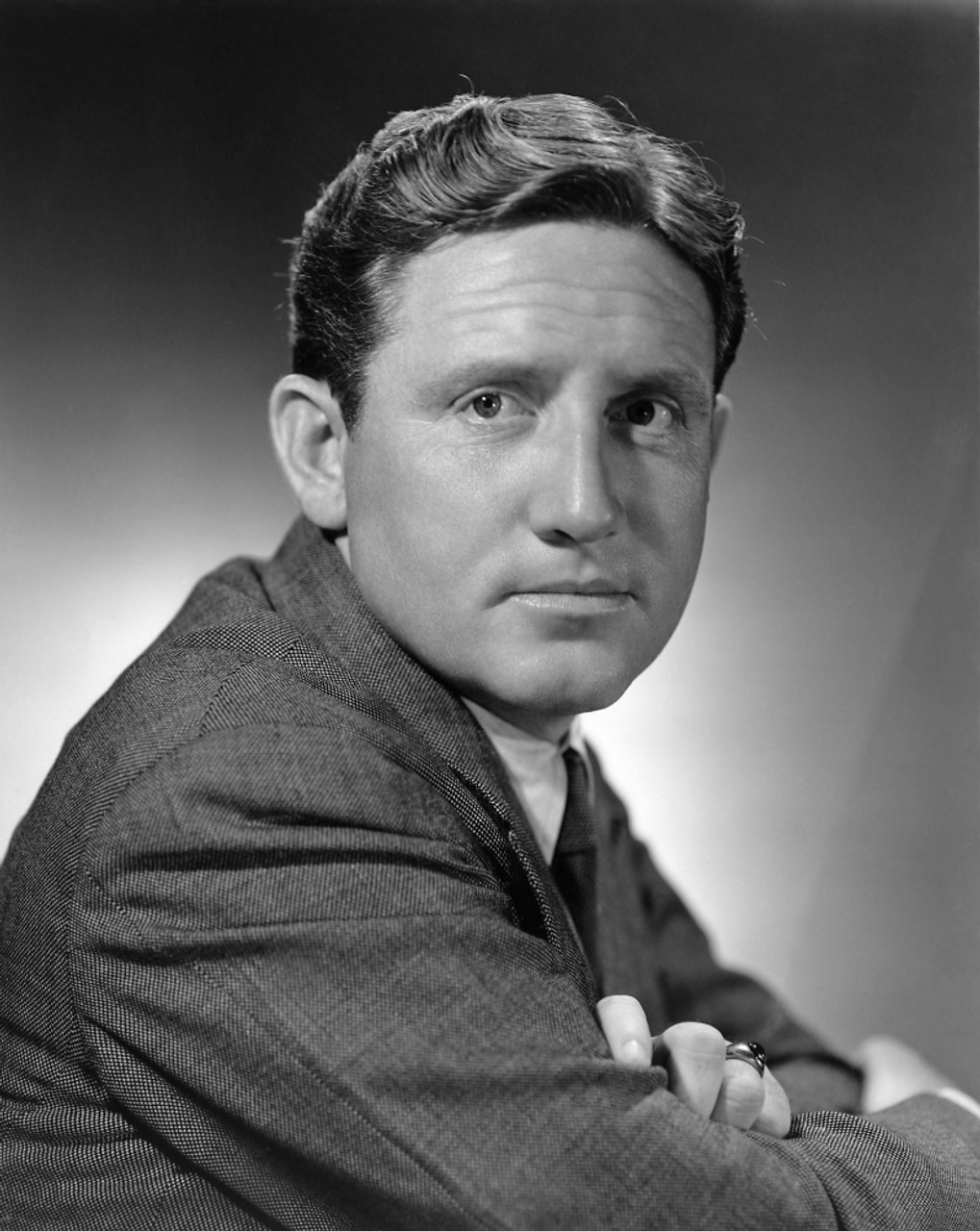
American actor Spencer Tracy.

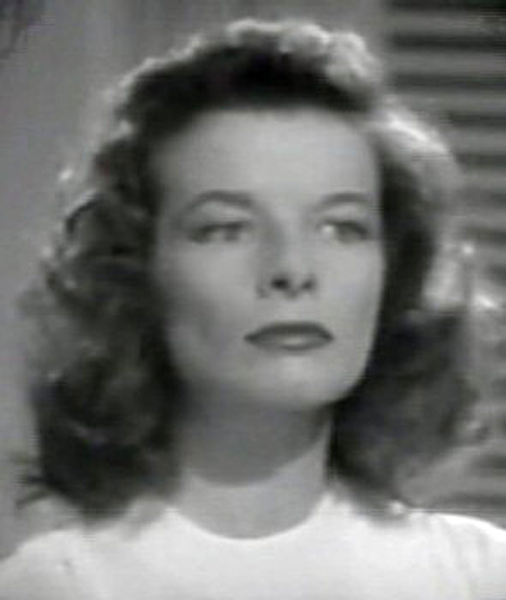
Actress Katharine Hepburn portrayed Tracy Lord in the 1940 American romantic comedy film The Philadelphia Story.

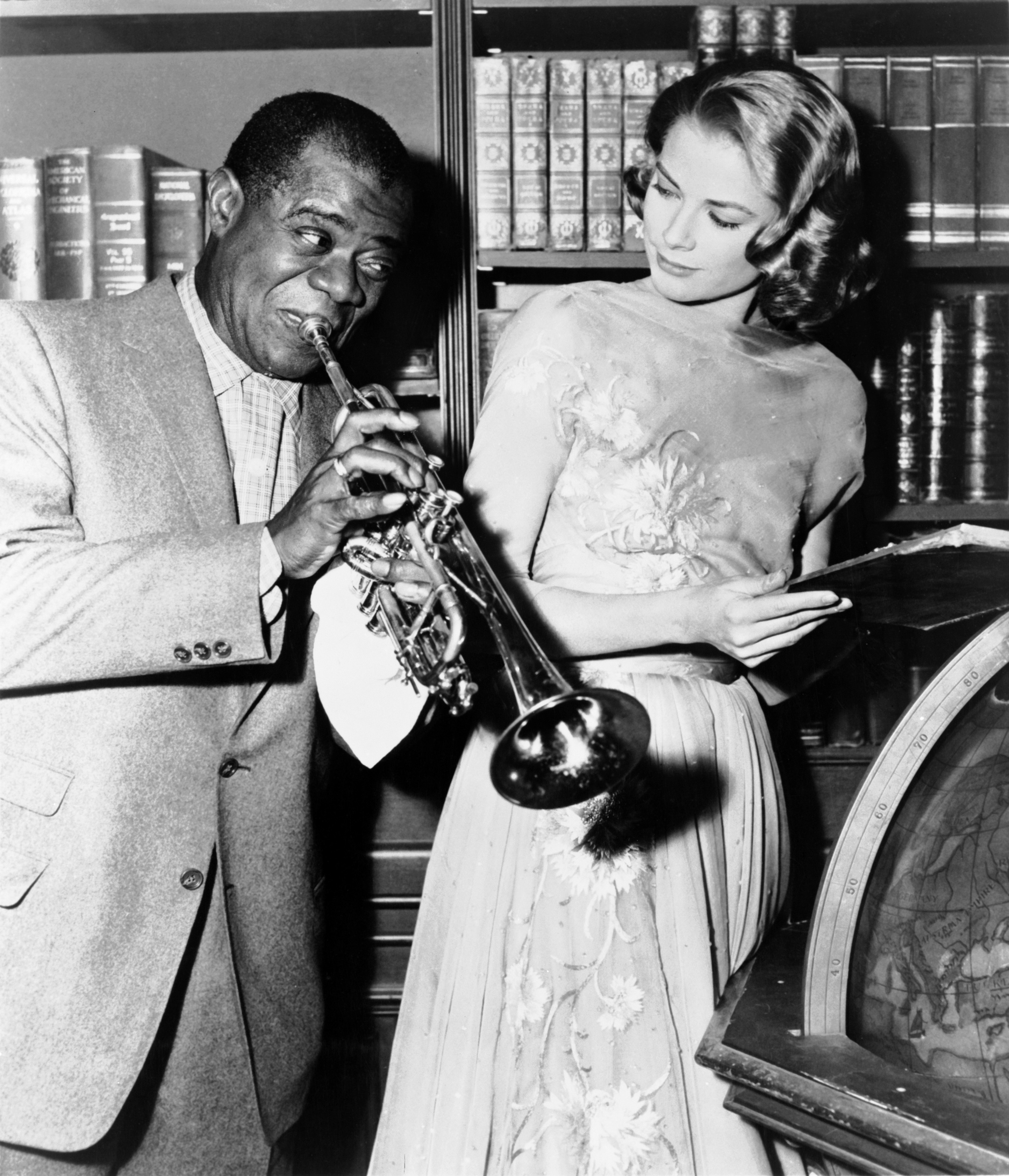
Grace Kelly portrayed Tracy Samantha Lord in the 1956 American romantic comedy musical film High Society. Kelly is pictured with Louis Armstrong on the film set.

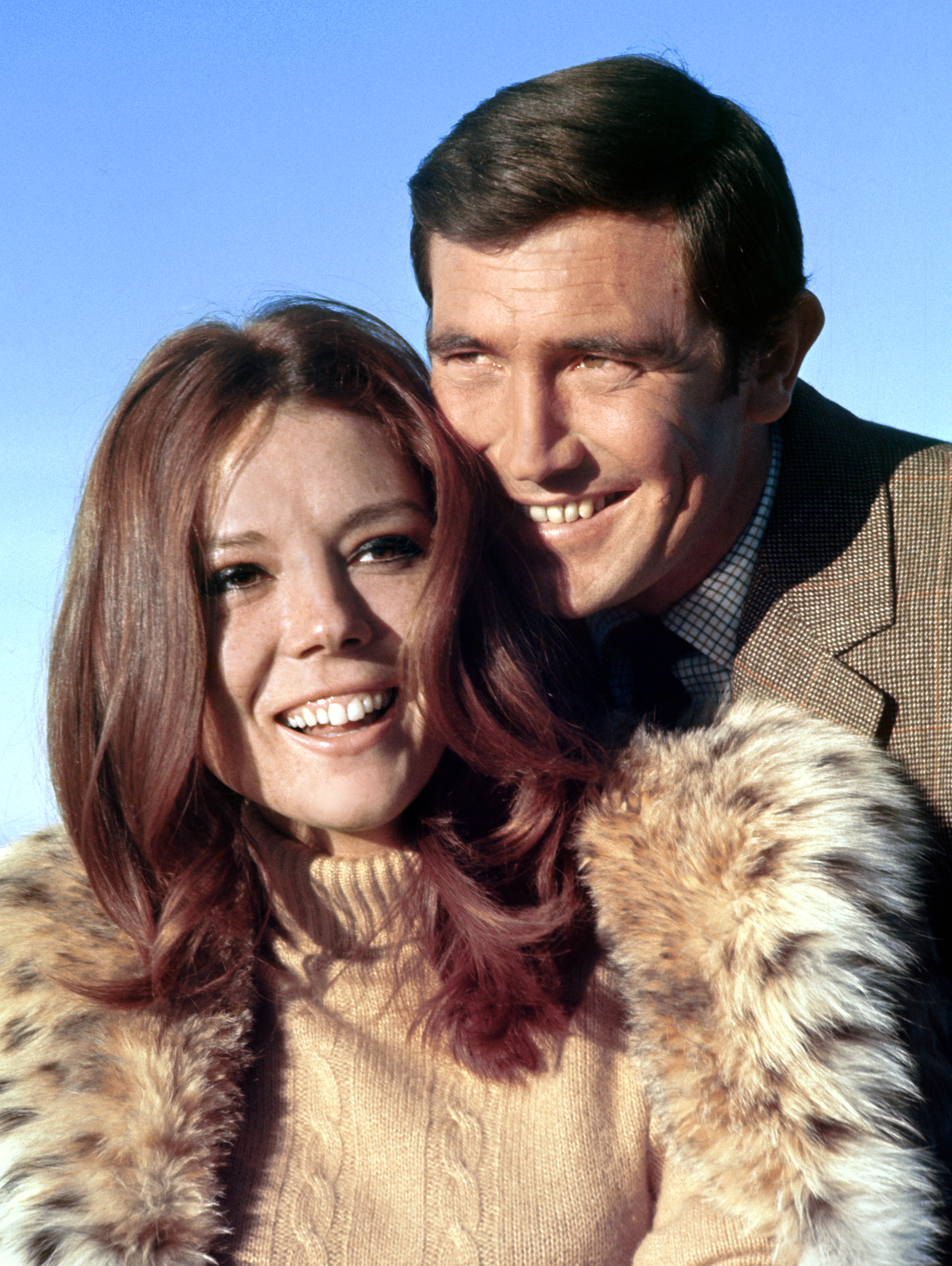
Diana Rigg portrayed Tracy Bond and George Lazenby portrayed James Bond in the 1969 Bond film On Her Majesty’s Secret Service.

Tracy (/ˈtreɪsi/; also spelled Tracey, Traci, Tracci, Tracee, Treacy or Tracie, or Trasci), is an English given name and surname. As a British personal name, it was originally adopted from Norman surnames such as those of the family de Tracy or de Trasci from Tracy-Bocage in Normandy, France. Derived from the Gaulish male name Draccios, or Latin Thracius ("of Thrace, Thracian"), and the well-identified Celtic suffix -āko ("place, property"), such Norman surnames themselves sprang from several Tracy place-names in France.

The Irish surname Tracey, which may similarly have contributed to the adoption of the English personal name, is derived from the native Irish O'Treasaigh septs. The name is taken from the Irish word "treasach" meaning "war-like" or "fighter". It is also translated as "higher", "more powerful" or "superior". It may also be derived from the Irish word for three, with an association to the Tuatha Dé Danann. The first reference to the surname in the Irish annals was in 1008: "Gussan, son of Ua Treassach, lord of Ui-Bairrche, died."

According to historian C. Thomas Cairney, the O'Tracys were one of the chiefly families of the Uí Bairrche who were a tribe of the Erainn who were the second wave of Celts to settle in Ireland between about 500 and 100 BC.

As a given name for girls, Tracy is a traditional English hypocorism for the name Teresa.

== Cultural influences ==
Usage of the name for boys was popularized by Dick Tracy, a fictional police detective in the American comic strip Dick Tracy, which has been in syndication since 1931, and by the fame of American actor Spencer Tracy.

It was popularized as a name for girls by Tracy Lord, a beautiful heiress played by Katharine Hepburn in the 1940 American romantic comedy film The Philadelphia Story and by Grace Kelly in the 1956 American romantic comedy musical film High Society, a remake of the 1940 film. Usage in the United States might have been affected by Tracy Ann Boyle, the daughter of newspaper columnist Hal Boyle. Boyle wrote about his daughter from the time he adopted her in 1953 until the early 1970s and her photograph was occasionally published in newspapers nationwide. Tracy, a bubblegum pop song by American band The Cufflinks, was released in 1969 and was a hit song throughout the English-speaking world. The song likely also influenced the popularity of the name in 1970. Another influence was the character Tracy Bond, the doomed wife of British secret agent James Bond in the film On Her Majesty’s Secret Service, which was released in December 1969.

== Given name ==
=== Australia ===
Tracy ranked among the 100 most popular names for girls in Australia between 1960 and 1981.

=== Canada ===
Tracy ranked among the 100 most popular names for Canadian girls between 1957 and 1984 and was among the ten most popular names for Canadian girls between 1969 and 1973.

=== France ===
Tracy was among the top 500 names for French girls between 1989 and 2003. It peaked in use in 1991, when it was ranked No. 169 on the French popularity chart.

=== Great Britain ===
In England and Wales, the name Tracy was not unknown but unusual, with about two a year from 1837 until 1955, after which the name quite suddenly became very popular, rising to a maximum of 7,667 girls being given that name in 1964. After 1970 the popularity quickly declined to 475 in 1985. It was among the top 100 names for girls in Scotland between 1964 and 1987. It peaked in popularity in 1970, when it was the 10th most popular name for Scottish girls.

- Tracy by year, England and Wales, 1837–1956
  Year	Number registered
  1836–1847	15
  1846–1857	7
  1856–1867	14
  1866–1877	19
  1876–1887	40
  1886–1897	27
  1896–1907	21
  1906–1917	5
  1916–1927	5
  1926–1937	7
  1938	1
  1939	1
  1940	0
  1941	5
  1942	2
  1943	3
  1944	8
  1945	4
  1946	2
  1947	5
  1948	3
  1949	1
  1950	2
  1951	2
  1952	6
  1953	4
  1954	18
  1955	10
  1956	29
- Tracy by year, England and Wales, 1957–1985
  Year	Number registered
  1957	271
  1958	399
  1959	536
  1960	1,163
  1961	2,640
  1962	2,857
  1963	4,546
  1964	7,667
  1965	7,222
  1966	7,034
  1967	6,052
  1968	6,117
  1969	5,188
  1970	7,737
  1971	6,453
  1972	5,096
  1973	3,861
  1974	3,219
  1975	2,789
  1976	2,036
  1977	2,340
  1978	2,315
  1979	2,056
  1980	1,734
  1981	1,319
  1982	1,052
  1983	899
  1984	830
  1985	475

=== Ireland ===
Tracy was among the 100 most popular names for girls in Ireland between 1970 and 1988. It was most popular in 1971, when it was the 54th most popular names for Irish girls.

=== New Zealand ===
Tracy ranked among the 100 most popular names for girls in New Zealand between 1961 and 1985. It peaked in 1970, when it was the 11th most popular names for girls in New Zealand.

=== United States ===
Tracy, as a transferred use of the surname, has been in use as a masculine name in the United States since the 19th century. It was among the 1,000 most popular names for American boys between 1880 and 1999, was among the top 200 names for boys between 1959 and 1974, and was at the height of popularity as a male name between 1966 and 1967, when it ranked 98th on the U.S. popularity chart for boys.

The name Tracy has been in occasional use as an independent name since the 19th century for American girls and appeared sporadically among the 1,000 most popular names for American girls in the 1880s and 1890s. Tracy ranked among the 1,000 most popular given names for American girls between 1942 and 2004 and was among the top 100 names for American girls between 1960 and 1984. It peaked in 1970, when it was the 10th most popular name for American girls.

== People ==
=== Surname ===
==== Tracy or Tracey ====
- Tracey (surname)
- Tracy (surname)
- Treacy

==== Trasci ====
Unrelated (pronounced "trashee")

- Ferruccio Baffa Trasci (1590–1656), Italian bishop, theologian and philosopher
- Demetrio Baffa Trasci Amalfitani Italian fashion editor, model and writer

==== De Tracy ====
- de Tracy

=== Given name ===
==== Women ====
===== Tracey =====
- Tracey Adams (born 1954), American abstract painter and printmaker
- Tracey Adams, American pornographic film actress
- Tracey Anarella (born 1963), American documentary filmmaker
- Tracey Andersson (born 1984), Swedish hammer thrower
- Tracey Atkin (born 1971), British swimmer
- Tracey Baker-Simmons (born 1967), American television producer
- Tracey Baptiste (born 1972), Trinidad and Tobago writer
- Tracey Ann Barnes (born 1975), Jamaican sprinter
- Tracey Beatty (born 1979), Australian basketball player
- Tracey Belbin (born 1967), Australian field hockey player
- Tracey Bell, Canadian comedian, impersonator, and impressionist
- Tracey Bernett (born 1955), American politician
- Tracey Birdsall (born 1963), American actress
- Tracey E. Bregman (born 1963), American actress
- Tracey Brindley (born 1972), British mountain runner
- Tracey Brown, Canadian country singer
- Tracey Brown, British scientist
- Tracey D. Brown, American businesswoman
- Tracey Browning (born 1963), Australian basketball player
- Tracey Challenor, Australian journalist
- Tracey Childs (born 1963), English actress
- Tracey Collins, American educator
- Tracey Conway (born 1956), American actress, comedian, writer, and cardiac health advocate
- Tracey Corderoy (born 1965), British children's writer
- Tracey Cox (born 1961), English author and columnist
- Tracey Crawford (born c. 1970), British television announcer and radio presenter
- Tracey Cross (born 1972), Australian Paralympic swimmer
- Tracey Crouch (born 1975), British politician
- Tracey Curro (born 1963), Australian journalist
- Tracey Curtis-Taylor (born 1962), British aviator
- Tracey Damigella (born c. 1969), American figure skater
- Tracey Davidson (born 1961), English football goalkeeper
- Tracey Davis (born 1977), Australian synchronized swimmer
- Tracey DeKeyser, Canadian ice hockey player and coach
- Tracey Deer (born 1978), Canadian screenwriter, film director, and newspaper publisher
- Tracey Dey (born 1943), American pop singer
- Tracey Dorow, American basketball player and coach
- Tracey Duke, New Zealand association football player
- Tracey Edmonds (born 1967), American television producer, television personality, and president and CEO of Edmonds Entertainment Group, Inc.
- Tracey Eide (born 1954), American politician
- Tracey Ellis, Canadian actress
- Tracey Emin (born 1963), English contemporary artist
- Tracey Fear (born 1959), Australian-New Zealand netball player
- Tracey Ferguson (born 1974), Canadian Paralympic wheelchair basketball player
- Tracey Forbes, Canadian television writer and producer
- Tracey Freeman (1948–2023), Australian Paralympic track and field athlete
- Tracey Fuchs (born 1966), American field hockey player
- Tracey Gaudry (born 1969), Australian sport administrator, cyclist, and businesswoman
- Tracey Gloster, British chemist
- Tracey Gold (born 1969), American actress
- Tracey Greenwood, American fitness competitor
- Tracey Hall, American basketball player
- Tracey Hallam (born 1975), English badminton player
- Tracey Hannah (born 1988), Australian downhill cyclist
- Tracey Herd (born 1968), Scottish poet
- Tracey Hiete (born 1971), American tennis player
- Tracey Hinton (born 1970), British Paralympic track and field athlete
- Tracey Holloway, American scientist and academic
- Tracey Holmes, Australian journalist and presenter
- Tracey Hoyt (born 1950), Canadian voice actress
- Tracey Jackson (born 1958), American author, blogger, screenwriter, film director, and producer
- Tracey Jackson, American talent agent
- Tracey Ann Jacobson (born 1965), American politician
- Tracey Johnston-Aldworth (born 1957), Canadian businesswoman and entrepreneur
- Tracey Kelliher, Irish singer and songwriter, known professionally as Tracey K
- Tracey Ann Kelly, American television soap opera writer
- Tracey Lambrechs (born 1985), New Zealand weightlifter
- Tracey Larson (born 1978), American field hockey player
- Tracey Leone (born 1967), American soccer player
- Tracey Lewis, Australian Paralympic swimmer
- Tracey Lindberg, Canadian writer, scholar, lawyer, and Indigenous Rights activist
- Tracey MacLeod (born 1960), English journalist and broadcaster
- Tracey Magee (born 1969), Irish journalist and broadcaster
- Tracey Martin (born 1964), New Zealand politician
- Tracey McClure, American journalist
- Tracey McDermott, British businesswoman
- Tracey McFarlane (born 1966), Canadian-American swimmer
- Tracey McIntosh, New Zealand sociologist, criminologist, and academic
- Tracey McLauchlan (born 1979), New Zealand table tennis player
- Tracey McLellan (born 1970), New Zealand politician
- Tracey Meares, American legal scholar and author
- Tracey Medeiros, American chef and cookbook author
- Tracey Melesko, Canadian Paralympic sprint and long jumper
- Tracey Menzies, Australian swimming coach
- Tracey Miller (1954–2005), American radio personality, editorial writer, and newspaper editor
- Tracey Moberly (born 1964), Welsh artist, author, and radio show host
- Tracey Moffatt (born 1960), Australian artist
- Tracey Moore (born 1960), Canadian voice actress and voice director
- Tracey Morris (born 1967), British long-distance runner
- Tracey Morton-Rodgers (born 1967), Australian tennis player
- Tracey Mosley (born 1973), Australian softball player
- Tracey Needham (born 1967), American actress
- Tracey Neuls, Canadian shoe designer
- Tracey Neville (born 1977), English netball player and coach
- Tracey Nicolaas (born 1987), Aruban model and Miss Universe participant
- Tracey Norman (born 1952), American model
- Tracey O'Connor (born 1982), New Zealand tennis player
- Tracey Oliver (born 1975), Australian Paralympic swimmer
- Tracey Panek, New Zealand Māori historian and archivist
- Tracey Pemberton (born 1981), Australian netball player
- Tracey Perry, Canadian politician
- Tracey Pettengill Turner (born c. 1971), American serial social entrepreneur
- Tracey Poirier, American National Guard colonel
- Tracey Porter, American children's author
- Tracey Ramsey (born 1971), Canadian politician
- Tracey Reynolds (born 1970s), British sociologist and professor
- Tracey Richardson (born 1982), British diver
- Tracey Roberts (1914/1915–2002), American actress and acting coach
- Tracey Roberts, English-American politician
- Tracey Rogers, Australian marine ecologist
- Tracey Rose (born 1974), South African artist
- Tracey Ross (born 1959), American actress
- Tracey Rouault, American rheumatologist and physician
- Tracey Rowland (born 1963), Australian Roman Catholic theologian and professor
- Tracey Seaward (born 1965), English film producer
- Tracey Shelton, Australian journalist
- Tracey Shors, American neuroscientist and professor
- Tracey Skoyles (born 1967), Irish cricketer
- Tracey Slaughter (born 1972), New Zealand writer and poet
- Tracey Snelling (born 1970), American artist
- Tracey Spicer, Australian journalist and social justice advocate
- Tracey Vivien Steinrucken, Australian Rhodes Scholar, ecologist, molecular biologist
- Tracey Stern, American television writer and producer
- Tracey Tan (born 1976), Singaporean sailor
- Tracey Tawhiao (born 1967), New Zealand artist
- Tracey Thomson, American television soap opera writer
- Tracey Thorn (born 1962), English singer, songwriter and writer
- Tracey Trench, American film producer
- Tracey Ullman (born 1959), English-born actress, comedian, singer, dancer, screenwriter, producer, director, author and businesswoman
- Tracey Vallois, American politician
- Tracey Waddleton (born 1979), Canadian writer
- Tracey Wainman (born 1967), Canadian figure skater
- Tracey Waters (born 1973), New Zealand rugby union player
- Tracey Weldon, American linguist
- Tracey West (born 1965), American children's author
- Tracey Wheeler (born 1967), Australian football goalkeeper
- Tracey Wickham (born 1962), Australian swimmer
- Tracey Wigfield (born 1983), American television writer
- Tracey Wigginton (born 1965), Australian murderer
- Tracey Wilkinson, English actress
- Tracey Scott Wilson, American playwright, television writer, television producer, and screenwriter
- Tracey Witch of Ware, English show dog

===== Traci =====
- Traci Hunter Abramson, American mystery and suspense novelist
- Traci Bartlett (born 1972), Australian soccer player
- Traci Bingham (born 1968), American actress, model, and television personality
- Traci D. Blackmon, American minister
- Traci Braxton (1971–2022), American singer, reality television personality, and radio personality
- Traci Brimhall, American poet and professor
- Tracy Brookshaw (born 1975), Canadian professional wrestler, professional wrestling valet, and professional wrestling referee, known by the ring name Traci Brooks
- Traci Chee, American author
- Traci Conrad-Fischer (born 1970s), American softball player and coach
- Traci Des Jardins (born 1965), American chef and restaurateur
- Traci Dinwiddie (born 1973), American film and television actress
- Traci Falbo, American long-distance runner
- Traci Gere, American politician
- Traci Hale, American pop and R&B songwriter and vocalist
- Traci Harding (born 1964), Australian novelist
- Traci Houpapa (born 1965/1966), company director and business advisor
- Traci Paige Johnson (born 1969), American animator, television producer, and voice actress
- Traci Koster (born 1985), American attorney and politician
- Traci Kueker-Murphy, American United States Air Force brigadier general
- Traci Lind (born 1968), American film actress
- Traci Loader (born 1970), Canadian make-up artist
- Traci Lords (born 1968), American actress, singer, model, writer, producer, and director
- Traci Melchor, Canadian television personality
- Traci Park, American attorney and politician
- Traci Phillips (born 1964), American sprint canoer
- Traci L. Slatton (born 1963), American author and columnist
- Traci Sorell, American author
- Traci Stumpf (born 1986), American TV host, stand-up comedian, and actress
- Traci Wolfe (born 1960), American film actress and model

===== Tracie =====
- Tracie O. Afifi, Canadian research scientist
- Tracie Andrews (born 1969), convicted murderer
- Tracie Bennett (born 1961), English actress
- Tracie Collins (born 1975), actress, writer, theatre director, and producer
- Tracie C. Collins, American academic, physician, and government official
- Tracie Davis (born 1970), American politician and teacher
- Tracie D. Hall, American librarian, author, curator, and advocate for the arts
- Tracie Howard, African-American writer of fiction
- Tracie Laymon, American actress, screenwriter, producer and film director
- Tracie McAra (born 1960), Canadian basketball player
- Tracie Joy McBride (1975–1995), American murder victim
- Tracie McGovern (born 1978), Australian international football player
- Tracie Morris, American poet and performer
- Tracie Peterson (born 1959), American author of Christian fiction
- Tracie Ruiz (born 1963), American synchronized swimmer
- Tracie Savage (born 1962), American actress and journalist
- Tracie Simpson, British television producer
- Tracie Spencer (born 1976), American singer
- Tracie Thomas (born 1965), American musician
- Tracie Thoms (born 1975), American actress and singer
- Tracie Chima Utoh, Nigerian playwright and professor
- Tracie Young (born 1965), British singer

===== Tracy =====
- Tracy Ackerman, British singer and songwriter
- Tracy Adams, American medievalist
- Tracy Ainsworth, Australian marine biologist and professor
- Tracy Akiror (born 1997), Ugandan footballer
- Tracy Allard (born 1971), Canadian politician
- Tracy Alloway, American journalist and podcaster
- Tracy Almeda-Singian (born 1979), American tennis player
- Tracy Anderson (born 1975), American fitness entrepreneur and author
- Tracy Arnold (born 1962), American actress
- Tracy Atiga, New Zealand rugby union player and franchise owner
- Tracy Austin (born 1962), American tennis player
- Tracy Axten (born 1963), English discus thrower
- Tracy Baim, American journalist, author, and filmmaker
- Tracy Bale, American neuroscientist and molecular biologist
- Tracy M. Barker (born 1957), American herpetologist
- Tracy Barlow (born 1985), British long-distance runner
- Tracy Barnes (born 1982), American biathlete
- Tracy Barrell (born 1974), Australian Paralympic swimmer
- Tracy Barrett, American author
- Tracy Bartram, Australian comedian, radio personality, and podcaster
- Tracy Bennett, American editor
- Tracy Berno, New Zealand academic
- Tracy Bonham (born 1967), American alternative rock musician
- Tracy Borman (born 1972), English historian and author
- Tracy-Lee Botha (born 1988), South African lawn bowler
- Tracy L. Boyland (born 1968), American politician
- Tracy Brabin (born 1961), British politician
- Tracy Bricchi, American politician
- Tracy Britt Cool (born 1984), American business executive and entrepreneur
- Tracy Brogan, American author
- Tracy Brook (born 1971), Australian figure skater
- Tracy Brown (born 1974), American author
- Tracy Brown-May (born 1967), American politician
- Tracy Byrd (born 1964), American boxer
- Tracy Byrnes (born 1970), American television business news anchor, journalist, and accountant
- Tracy Caldwell Dyson (born 1969), American chemist and astronaut
- Tracy Cameron (born 1975), Canadian rower
- Tracy Camp (born 1964), American computer scientist
- Tracy Caulkins (born 1963), American swimmer
- Tracy Chamoun (born 1960), Lebanese author, diplomat, and political activist
- Tracy Chapman (born 1964), American singer-songwriter
- Tracy Nicole Chapman, American stage actress
- Tracy Chevalier (born 1962), American-British novelist
- Tracy Chou (born 1983), Taiwanese actress
- Tracy Chou (born 1987), American software engineer and advocate for diversity in technological fields
- Tracy Chu (born 1988), Hong Kong-Canadian actress, television presenter, and barrister
- Tracy Claxton (born 1961/1962), American basketball player
- Tracy Clayton (born 1982/1983), American writer and journalist
- Tracy Cohen, Canadian television producer
- Tracy Coogan, Irish actress
- Tracy Cortez (born 1993), American mixed martial artist
- Tracy Coster, Australian country singer
- Tracy Cox-Smyth (born 1966), Zimbabwean springboard diver
- Tracy Cramer, American politician
- Tracy Dahl (born 1961), Canadian soprano singer
- Tracy Dares, Canadian pianist
- Tracy Daszkiewicz (born 1973), English public health worker
- Tracy Davidson, American news presenter
- Tracy Davidson-Celestine (born 1978), Tobagonian politician
- Tracy Davis (born 1962), Australian politician
- Tracy Dawber (born 1966), English pedophile convicted in the 2009 Plymouth child abuse case
- Tracy Dawes-Gromadzki (born 1972), Australian ecologist
- Tracy Dawson (born 1983), Canadian actress, comedian, and writer
- Tracy Dempsey (born 1950), American politician
- Tracy Dennis-Tiwary (born 1973), American clinical psychologist, author, health technology entrepreneur, and professor
- Tracy Deonn, American author
- Tracy Dockray (born 1962), American artist and children's novel illustrator
- Tracy Drain, American NASA engineer
- Tracy Ducar (born 1973), American soccer goalkeeper
- Tracy Duncan (born 1971), Canadian rower
- Tracy Edser (born 1982), South African photojournalist and documentary producer
- Tracy Edwards (born 1962), British sailor
- Tracy Ehlert, American politician
- Tracy Eisser (born 1989), American rower
- Tracy Emblem (born 1955), American attorney and politician
- Tracy Evans (born 1967), American freestyle skier
- Tracy Eyrl-Shortland, New Zealand netball player
- Tracy Flannigan, American filmmaker
- Tracy Fleury (born 1986), Canadian curler
- Tracy Freundt (born 1985), Peruvian model
- Tracy Fullerton (born 1965), American game designer, educator, and writer
- Tracy Gahan (born 1980), American basketball player
- Tracy Garneau, Canadian ultramarathoner
- Tracy L. Garrett, American United States Marine Corps major general
- Tracy Goddard (born 1969), British track and field athlete
- Tracy Grammer (born 1968), American folk singer
- Tracy Grandstaff, American voice actress, writer, consultant, production assistant, and singer
- Tracy Grant Lord, New Zealand scenographer and costume designer
- Tracy Gray (born 1969/1970), Canadian politician
- Tracy Griffith (born 1965), American actress, sushi chef, and painter
- Tracy Grimshaw (born 1960), Australian journalist and television presenter
- Tracy Grose, American soccer player and coach
- Tracy Hamlin, American singer-songwriter
- Tracy Hanson (born 1971), American golfer
- Tracy Harris (born 1958), American artist
- Tracy Harvey, Australian comedian, television presenter, actor, and writer
- Tracy Maxwell Heard (born 1963), American politician
- Tracy Henderson (born 1974), American basketball player
- Tracy A. Henke, American politician
- Tracy Higgs (born 1970), self-described psychic medium
- Tracy Hitchings (born 1969), English musician
- Tracy Hogg (1960–2004), British nurse and author
- Tracy Huang (born 1951), Taiwanese singer
- Tracy Hutson, American reality television personality
- Tracy Hyde (born 1959), British actress and model
- Tracy Ifeachor, British actress
- Tracy Ip (born 1981), Hong Kong actress and model
- Tracy Camilla Johns, American film actress
- Tracy L. Johnson, American biologist
- Tracy L. Kahn, American citrus scientist
- Tracy Keenan Wynn (born 1945), American screenwriter and producer
- Tracy Keith-Matchitt (born 1990), New Zealand-Cook Islands swimmer
- Tracy Kendler (1918–2001), American research psychologist
- Tracy Kennedy, Canadian curler
- Tracy Kerdyk (born 1966), American golfer
- Tracy Kraft-Tharp, American politician and teacher
- Tracy Krumm, American textile artist, craft educator, and curator
- Tracy Langlands (born 1970), British rower
- Tracy LaQuey Parker, Canadian-American businesswoman
- Tracy Lee (born 1985), Malaysian actress and television host
- Tracy Lemon (1970–2012), New Zealand rugby union player
- Tracy Li (born 1972), South African ballet dancer
- Tracy Lin (born 1986), American tennis player
- Tracy Little (born 1985), Canadian synchronized swimmer
- Tracy Looze (born 1973), Australian track and field athlete
- Tracy Thu Luong (born 1987), Vietnamese basketball player
- Tracy Lyons (born 1970), English pedophile convicted in the 2009 Plymouth child abuse case
- Tracy MacCharles (born c. 1963), Canadian politician
- Tracy Mackenna (born 1963), British sculptor and artist
- Tracy Mann (born 1957), Australian actress and voice artist
- Tracy Martin, American author
- Tracy Mattes (born 1969), American track and field athlete and Humanitarian activist
- Tracy McCreery (born 1966), American politician
- Tracy McMillan (born 1964), American author and television writer
- Tracy-Anne McPhee, Canadian politician
- Tracy Medve, Canadian airline executive
- Tracy Melchior (born 1970), American author and actress
- Tracy Middendorf (born 1970), American television, movie, and stage actress
- Tracy Miller (born 1966), American painter
- Tracy Mills (born 1962), Canadian volleyball player
- Tracy Moens, American rugby union player
- Tracy Montminy (1911–1992), American artist and muralist
- Tracy Moore (born 1975), Canadian television journalist and talk show host
- Tracy Moseley (born 1979), British racing cyclist
- Tracy Mulholland, New Zealand politician
- Tracy Mutinhiri, Zimbabwean politician
- Tracy Dickinson Mygatt (1885–1973), American writer and pacifist
- Tracy Nakayama (born 1974), American artist
- Tracy Negoshian (born 1981), American fashion designer
- Tracy Nelson (born 1944), American singer
- Tracy Nelson (born 1963), American actress and writer
- Tracy Newman, American television producer, writer, comedian, and musician
- Tracy R. Norris, American Texas National Guard Adjutant General
- Tracy Northup (born 1978), American physicist
- Tracy-Ann Oberman (born 1966), English actress, playwright, and narrator
- Tracy Oliver, American film and television writer, producer, director, and actress
- Tracy Lynn Olivera, American actress
- Tracy O'Neill, American writer
- Tracy Osborn, American soccer player
- Tracy Otto (born 1995), American Paralympic archer
- Tracy Packiam Alloway, American psychologist and professor
- Tracy Palmer (born 1967), English biologist and professor
- Tracy Pennycuick, American politician
- Tracy Perez (born 1993), Filipino model, industrial engineer, and beauty pageant titleholder
- Tracy Petrocelli (born 1951), American convicted serial killer
- Tracy Phillips, New Zealand high jumper
- Tracy Piggott (born 1966), British horse jockey and broadcaster
- Tracy Pollan (born 1960), American actress
- Tracy Posner (born 1962), American businesswoman, animal rights activist, and actress
- Tracy Poust, American producer and writer
- Tracy Price-Thompson (born 1963), American speaker, novelist, editor, and U.S. Army Engineer Officer
- Tracy Quan (born 1977), American writer
- Tracy Quint, American politician
- Tracy Rector (born 1972), American filmmaker, curator, and arts advocate
- Tracy Redies, Canadian actress
- Tracy Reed (1942–2012), English actress
- Tracy Reed, American actress and model
- Tracy Reed, American writer
- Tracy Reese (born 1964), American fashion designer
- Tracy Reid (born 1976), American basketball player
- Tracy Reiner (born 1964), American actress
- Tracy Richardson (born 1965), American politician
- Tracy Riley (born 1966), New Zealand academic and professor
- Tracy Robinson, Jamaican attorney and lecturer
- Tracy Ann Route (born 1985), Micronesian swimmer
- Tracy-Ann Rowe (born 1985), Jamaican sprinter
- Tracy Rude (born 1968), American rower
- Tracy Ryan (born 1964), Australian poet, novelist, editor, publisher, translator, and academic
- Tracy Ryan (born 1971), Canadian film, television, and stage actress
- Tracy St. Claire, Canadian politician
- Tracy Sachtjen (born 1969), American curler
- Tracy Schmitt, Canadian alpine skier and motivational speaker
- Tracy Scoggins (born 1953/1959), American actress
- Tracy Scott (1970–2016), American script supervisor
- Tracy Sefl, American political consultant
- Tracy Seretean, American filmmaker
- Tracy Denean Sharpley-Whiting, American feminist scholar
- Tracy Shaw (born 1973), British actress and singer
- Tracy Slatyer, Australian physicist
- Tracy Smart, Australian physician, medical administrator, and Royal Australian Air Force senior officer
- Tracy Smith (born 1945), American runner
- Tracy Smith (born 1964), Canadian long jumper
- Tracy Smith, American news correspondent
- Tracy K. Smith (born 1972), American poet and educator
- Tracy Somerset, Duchess of Beaufort (born 1958), British duchess, environmental activist, and actress
- Tracy Sorensen (1963–2025), Australian novelist, filmmaker, and academic
- Tracy Spencer (born 1962), British Italo disco singer and actress
- Tracy Spiridakos (born 1988), Canadian actress
- Tracy Splinter (born 1971), German-South African writer who has been missing since 2016
- Tracy Staab (born 1963), American judge
- Tracy Stalls (born 1984), American volleyball player
- Tracy Stone-Manning (born 1965), American environmental policy advisor
- Tracy Teal, American bioinformatician
- Tracy Tutor (born 1975), American actress, author, real estate agent, and reality television personality
- Tracy Velazquez, American politician
- Tracy Vilar (born 1968), American actress
- Tracy Vo (born 1983), Australian journalist, radio and television news presenter, reporter, and author
- Tracy Weber (died 1981), American singer
- Tracy Weber, American journalist and reporter
- Tracy Wells (born 1971), American actress
- Tracy Wiles (born c. 1970), English actress
- Tracy Wilson (born 1961), Canadian ice dancer
- Tracy Wiscombe (born 1979), Scottish Paralympic swimmer
- Tracy Wolfson (born 1975), American sportscaster
- Tracy Wormworth (born 1958), American bass guitarist
- Tracy Wright (1959–2010), Canadian actress
- Tracy Young, American DJ, producer, and remixer
- Tracy, British teen singer

==== Men ====
===== Tracey =====
- Tracey Eaton (born 1965), American football player
- Tracey Johnson, American baseball player
- Tracey Katelnikoff (born 1968), Canadian ice hockey player
- Tracey Kelusky (born 1975), Canadian lacrosse player and coach
- Tracey Lee (1933–1990), Australian drag queen
- Tracey Lee (born 1970), American hip hop artist and entertainment lawyer
- Tracey Mann (born 1970s), American businessman and politician
- Tracey Moore (1941–2018), English cricketer
- Tracey Perkins (born 1968), American football player
- Tracey Rosebud (born 1976), American politician
- Tracey Steele, American politician
- Tracey Walter (born 1947), American character actor

===== Tracy =====
- Tracy Abrams (born 1992), American basketball player
- Trace Adkins (born 1962), American country singer, songwriter, and actor
- Tracy Baker (1891–1975), American baseball player
- Tracy Barnes (1911–1972), American CIA senior staff member
- Tracy Baskin (born 1965), American middle-distance runner
- Tracy Beadle (1808–1877), American druggist, banker, and politician
- Tracy Beckman (born 1945), American politician
- Tracy Belton (born 1984), American football player
- Tracy Boe, American politician
- Tracy Byrd (born 1966), American country singer
- Tracy Callis, American boxing historian, writer, and journalist
- Tracy Campbell Dickson (1868–1936), American United States Army officer
- Tracy Y. Cannon (1879–1961), American musician, composer, and musicologist
- Tracy Claeys (born 1968), American football coach
- Tracy L. Cross (born 1958), American educational psychologist and developmental scientist
- Tracy Daugherty, American author
- Tracy Delatte (born 1956), American tennis player
- Tracy Dildy (born 1966), American basketball coach
- Tracy Drake (1864–1939), American hotelier
- Tracy Estes (born 1967), American politician
- Tracy Ferrie, American musician
- Tracy Franz (born 1960), American football player
- Tracy Elliot Hazen (1874–1943), American botanist and author
- Tracy Gravely (born 1968), Canadian football player
- Tracy Greene, American football player
- Tracy Grijalva (born 1959), American guitarist best known as Tracy G
- Tracii Guns, (born 1966) American guitarist, born Tracy Ulrich
- Tracy Hall (1919–2008), American physical chemist
- Tracy Ham (born 1964), American football player
- Tracy Hayworth (born 1967), American football player
- Tracy Hickman (born 1955), American best-selling fantasy author
- Tracy Hines (born 1972), American auto racing driver and stunt driver
- Tracy Holland, American football coach
- Tracy Howard (born 1994), American football player
- Tracy Howe (born 1952), Canadian musician, singer, and songwriter
- Tracy Inglis (1875–1937), New Zealand medical practitioner, war surgeon, and sports administrator
- Tracy Inman (born 1961), American dancer, choreographer, and educator
- Tracy Jackson (born 1959), American basketball player
- Tracy Jaeckel (1905–1969), American fencer
- Tracy Johnson (born 1966), American football player
- Tracy Jones (born 1961), American baseball player
- Tracy Kidder (1945–2026), American writer of nonfiction books
- Tracy King (born 1960), American businessman
- Tracy W. King, American United States Marine Corps Major General
- Tracy Krohn (born 1954), American entrepreneur and racing driver
- Tracy Lawrence (born 1968), American country singer
- Tracy Lazenby (born 1959), English rugby league footballer
- Tracy Leslie (born 1957), American racing driver
- Tracy Letts (born 1965), American playwright, screenwriter, and actor
- Tracy R. Lewis, American economist and professor
- Tracy Maddux, American music industry executive
- Tracy Marrow (born 1958), given name of American rapper and actor Ice-T
- Tracy McCleary (died 2003), American jazz musician
- Tracy McGrady (born 1979), American basketball player
- Tracy W. McGregor (1869–1936), American humanitarian, philanthropist, and civic leader
- Tracy Moore (born 1965), American basketball player
- Tracy Moresby (1867–1933), New Zealand cricketer
- Tracy Morgan (born 1968), American stand-up comedian and actor
- Tracy Mpati (born 1992), Belgian footballer
- Tracy Murray (born 1971), American basketball player, coach, and color commentator
- Tracy Harris Patterson (born 1964), American boxer
- Tracy E. Perkins (born 1971), American U.S. Army Sergeant First Class
- Tracy Pew (1957–1986), Australian musician
- Tracy Philipps (1888–1959), British public servant, soldier, colonial administrator, traveler, journalist, propagandist, conservationist, and secret agent
- Tracy Porter (born 1959), American social activist, entrepreneur, and football player
- Tracy Porter (born 1986), American football player
- Tracy Potter (born 1950), American historian and politician
- Tracy Pratt (born 1943), American-Canadian ice hockey player
- Tracy Putnam (1894–1975), American neuroscientist
- Tracy Read (1961–1987), American racing driver
- Tracy Ringolsby (born 1951), American sportswriter
- Tracy Robertson (born 1989), American football player
- Tracy Rocker (born 1966), American football player and coach
- Tracy Rogers (born 1967), American football player
- Tracy Rowlett (born 1942), American journalist, news anchor, and managing editor
- Tracy Scroggins (born 1969), American football player
- Tracy Silverman (born 1960), American violinist, composer, and producer
- Tracy Simien (born 1967), American football player and coach
- Tracy Smith (born 1966), American baseball player and coach
- Tracy Smith, American football coach
- Tracy Smothers (1962–2020), American wrestler
- Tracy Sonneborn (1905–1981), American biologist
- Tracy Stafford (born 1948), American politician
- Tracy Stallard (1937–2017), American baseball pitcher
- Tracy Steele (born 1963), American politician
- Tracy Lee Stum, American artist
- Tracy Sugarman (1921–2013), American illustrator
- Tracy T, rapper
- Tracy D. Terrell (1943–1991), American education theorist
- Tracy Yerkes Thomas (1899–1983), American mathematician
- Tracy A. Thompson, American Chief of Staff of the United States Army Reserve Command
- Tracy Thorne-Begland (born 1966), American judge
- Tracy Thornton, American steelpan player and musician
- Tracy Tormé (born 1959), American screenwriter and television producer
- Tracy Trotter, American cinematographer
- Tracy Ulrich (born 1966), better known as Tracii Guns, American guitarist and founder of L.A. Guns, Brides of Destruction, and Contraband
- Tracy Voorhees (1890–1974), American colonel and civil servant
- Tracy Walker (born 1995), American football player
- Tracy Webster (born 1971), American basketball player and coach
- Tracy White (born 1981), American football player
- Tracy Williams (born 1964), American basketball player and coach
- Tracy Williams (born 1989), American wrestler
- Tracy Wilson (born 1989), American football player
- Tracy Woodson (born 1962), American baseball player and coach
- Tracy Yardley (born 1979), American comic book artist

== Fictional characters ==
- Christopher Tracy, the main character of the film Under the Cherry Moon, played by Prince.
- Sheriff Tracy, a minor character from the video game Starhawk.
- Dick Tracy, a comic-book detective
- Grandma Tracy, a character in the 1965 Supermarionation TV series Thunderbirds; also her son Jeff and grandsons Scott, Virgil, Alan, Gordon and John, the show's main protagonists
- Tracey De Santa, a character from the video game Grand Theft Auto V
- Tracey (EastEnders) from the television series EastEnders
- Tracy, a character in the movie 2009 American comedy film The Hangover
- Tracey McBean, titular character of the Australian television series of the same name
- Tracey Sketchit (Kenji), a character in the Pokémon anime and manga series
- Tracey Stubbs, a character in the British sitcom Birds of a Feather
- Traci 13, a DC Comics heroine
- Traci Abbott, a character on the American soap opera, The Young and the Restless
- Tracy (Toshinden Character), a character in the Battle Arena Toshinden fighting game series
- Tracy Barlow, in the UK soap TV series Coronation Street
- Tracy Beaker, eponymous character of British children's drama franchise The Story of Tracy Beaker
- Tracy Billings, a character in the 2011 film The Hangover Part II
- Tracy Bond, the wife of James Bond
- Tracy Flick, main character in the American black comedy film Election
- Tracy Freeland, in the 2003 American drama film Thirteen
- Tracy Hansen in the movie 13 Going on 30
- Tracy Jordan, a character of the TV series 30 Rock
- Tracy McConnell, a character of the American sitcom How I Met Your Mother
- Tracy Mills, the character played by Gwyneth Paltrow in Se7en
- Tracy Pollard, a character in the American television series Star Trek: Discovery
- Tracy Quartermaine, a character in the ABC soap opera General Hospital
- Tracy Reynolds, a character from the film Like Mike
- Tracy Reznik, a survivor in the video game Identity V
- Tracy Stewart, a character in the television series Teen Wolf
- Tracy Strauss, a character in the TV series Heroes
- Tracy Tupman, character in Charles Dickens's first novel, The Pickwick Papers
- Tracy Turnblad, the main character in the 1988 film Hairspray, and its 2002 musical adaptation (and in turn, its 2007 film adaptation)
- Tracy Lord, the socialite protagonist played by Katharine Hepburn in the 1939 play The Philadelphia Story and its 1940 film version, and by Grace Kelly in the 1956 musical adaptation High Society
- Tracy, in the 1929 film Blackmail
- Tracy, in the cartoon series Jay Jay the Jet Plane
- Tracy, in the video game EarthBound; see Ness (EarthBound)
- Tracy, from the 1929 film Blackmail
- Tracy Newkirk, in the video game Mewgenics
- Tracy, a character from the 2010 comedy film Tooth Fairy
- Traycee Banks, in the American teen sitcom television series Malibu, CA

== See also ==
- Justice Tracy (disambiguation)
- Tracy (disambiguation)
- Irish clans
