= Tracy =

Tracy, Tracey, or Tracie may refer to:

== People and fictional characters ==
- Tracy (name), including a list of people and fictional characters with the given name or surname, also encompassing spelling variations

== Places ==
=== United States ===
- Tracy, California
  - Tracy Municipal Airport (California), airport owned by the City of Tracy
  - Deuel Vocational Institution, a California state prison sometimes referred to as "Tracy"
  - Tracy station, a train station in southern Tracy, California
- Tracy, a neighborhood in Wallingford, Connecticut
- Tracy, Illinois
- Tracy, Indiana
- Tracy, Iowa
- Tracy, Kentucky
- Tracy, Minnesota
- Tracy, Missouri
- Tracy, Montana
- Tracy, Oklahoma
- Tracy City, Tennessee

=== Elsewhere ===
- Tracy, New Brunswick, Canada
- Tracy (now part of Sorel-Tracy), Quebec, Canada
- Tracy Glacier (Greenland)

== Music ==
- Tracie (singer) (Tracie Young, born 1965), British singer
- Tracie (album), a 1999 album by Tracie Spencer
- "Tracy" (The Cuff Links song), by The Cuff Links on their first album Tracy in 1969
- "Tracy" (Mogwai song), by Scottish group Mogwai from their 1997 debut, Mogwai Young Team
- "Tracy", a song, by DJ Ironik from his album No Point in Wasting Tears
- "Tracie" (song), by the British band Level 42

== Power stations ==
- Frank A. Tracy Generating Station, a 1,021-MW gas-fired thermal power station in Nevada
- Tracy Thermal Generating Station, a retired 660-MW heavy fuel oil-fueled thermal power station in Quebec

== Other uses ==
- Tracey (film), a 2018 Hong Kong film
- Tracy (sheep), a transgenically modified sheep
- Cyclone Tracy, 25 December 1974, Northern Australia
