= State of the Black Union =

Annual event in the United States (2000–2009)

The State of the Black Union was an annual event in the United States to consider issues of particular relevance in the African American community, featuring prominent speakers such as John Conyers, Jesse Jackson, Al Sharpton, and Cornel West. The event was founded by Tavis Smiley, was free to the public, and was held every February, during Black History Month, from 2000 to 2009. It aired on C-SPAN to a viewership of over 50 million people and was attended by thousands every year.

Event sponsors over the years included the AARP, Allstate, ExxonMobil, McDonald's, Verizon, Walmart, and Wells Fargo.

== History ==
Tavis Smiley and Tom Joyner founded the State of the Black Union. The first conference took place in Los Angeles in 2000, the night before that year's Democratic National Convention, which was held in the same city.

The event took place in Washington, D.C. in 2001, in Philadelphia in 2002, in Detroit in 2003, in Miami in 2004, and at New Birth Missionary Baptist Church in Stonecrest, Georgia in 2005. In 2006, it was held in Houston and focused on the immediate impacts of Hurricane Katrina.

The 2007 event was held at Hampton University in Virginia as part of the Jamestown 2007 event commemorating the Emancipation Proclamation and the 400th anniversary of the establishment of Jamestown, Virginia. 8,000 people attended.

The 2008 event was held in at the Ernest N. Morial Convention Center in New Orleans, and focused on the lingering long-term effects of Hurricane Katrina. Then-Senator Barack Obama declined to appear at that year's State of the Black Union event, but sent a letter stating that he needed to focus on his presidential campaign.

The 2009 event was held in Los Angeles. Obama, who had just begun the first year of his presidency, attended virtually, giving a live speech that was broadcast to in-person attendees and remote viewers.

In January 2010, Smiley announced that he was ending the event in favour of producing more programs for the Public Broadcasting Service and growing his media company.

== Impact ==
Linguist Tracey Weldon wrote a book called Middle Class African American English about code switching among middle-class Black Americans. Weldon began writing her book after watching recordings of the State of the Black Union conferences and noting differences in the way speakers addressed in-person audiences versus live audiences.

== See also ==
- 2000s in the United States
- African-American culture
- African American Policy Forum
- National African American Leadership Summit
- National Black Political Convention
- Post–civil rights era in African-American history
- State of the Union
