= A. Latham Staples =

American activist (born 1977)

- Born: April 16, 1977 (age 49); Fort Worth, Texas, U.S.
- Education: Baylor University(B.A.)
- Occupations: President and CEO of EXUSMED, Inc.; Founder and Chairman of Empowering Spirits Foundation; Fellow at Echoing Green
- Political party: Democratic (2008–present); Republican (1995–2008)
- Movement: Civil Rights Movement
- Spouse: Brent Kostelecky (m. 2008–2013)

A. Latham Staples (born 1977) is a San Diego, California, community leader, a corporate executive, and an American civil rights activist. He is the chief executive officer of EXUSMED, Inc., a healthcare corporation based in La Jolla, California, and Chairman of the Empowering Spirits Foundation, Inc. (ESF), a national LGBT civil rights organization he founded in the United States.

== Early life and education ==
Staples grew up in Fort Worth, Texas, where he attended school at Fort Worth Academy, a private school his parents helped found. He spent his Summers in Albany, Texas, his grandparents' hometown, to perform annually in the Fort Griffin Fandangle, the oldest outdoor musical in the state of Texas. His undergraduate studies took Staples to Waco, Texas, where he attended Baylor University, a Baptist-affiliated private university. Staples graduated in 1999 as part of the first class of the Baylor Interdisciplinary Core, a division of the Honor's College, where he earned a Bachelor of Arts in Journalism and Political Science. It was at Baylor that Staples became heavily involved in public service. He served as assistant to Lester Gibson, McLennan County Precinct 2 Commissioner, and joined and served in various officer roles in Alpha Phi Omega (APO), a national service fraternity. Through APO Staples spent many of his weekends building homes for Habitat for Humanity or volunteering at a local children's learning center. Staples also coordinated with the American Red Cross the largest blood drive in central Texas' history. In addition, Staples was elected to Baylor Student Congress in various roles throughout his collegiate years, including Arts & Sciences Representative and Senior Class Representative.

== Corporate career ==
In 2013 Staples became the chief executive officer of EXUSMED, Inc. (EXUSMED), a healthcare corporation based in La Jolla, California. Prior to joining EXUSMED, Staples served as the president and CEO of Empowering Spirits Foundation, Inc. (ESF), a national non-profit organization he founded in 2008. Preceding ESF Staples was a corporate sales director for Dell, Inc. where he facilitated the creation and build-up of the business-to-business sales divisions at the corporation's then new Nashville, Tennessee, and Oklahoma City, Oklahoma, campuses.

Staples previously served as vice president of public relations and marketing at Red Ridge Entertainment, Inc. and as a professional healthcare consultant with AMN Healthcare.

== Civil rights activity ==
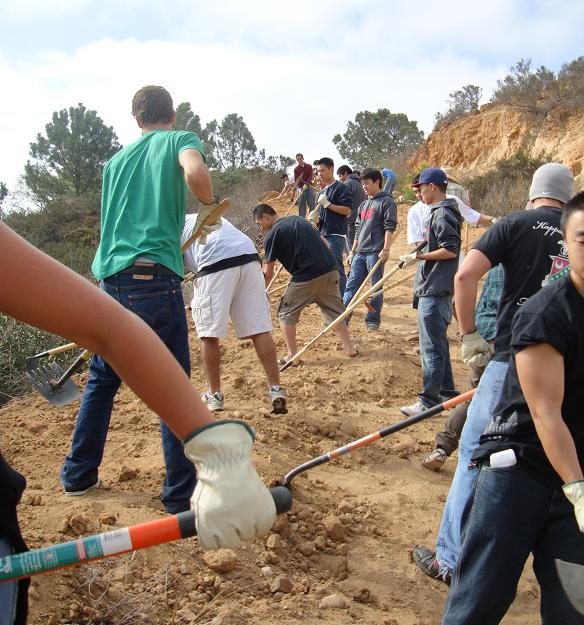
ESF volunteers build a new trail in the Gonzalez Canyon in San Diego, California.

Staples created Empowering Spirits Foundation in 2008 in response to the LGBTQ community's response to the passage of Proposition 8.

"The day after [the passage of Prop.8] various gay rights organizations attacked Christians, the Mormon Church and minority groups. In my mind this intolerance only amplified the hate, it didn't create change," said Staples, in a feature article about ESF.

Staples said he was laughed at when he suggested to one of the gay rights organizations that they should foster dialogue with those opposed to gay rights, instead of attacking them. Four days later Staples founded ESF, a pacifist LGBTQ civil rights organization.

ESF's programs are designed to encourage dialogue between the LGBTQ community and its non-LGBTQ neighbors while promoting open, non-disenfranchising communication.

=== Echoing Green ===
Echoing Green, an angel investor in social entrepreneurial organizations, named Staples a 2010 Fellow June 22, 2010, and committed to funding ESF for two years. Staples was the only grantee selected from the category of "Civil & Human Rights."

“We found both the mission and the approach of Mr. Staples and his organization to be refreshing and timely,” said Cheryl L. Dorsey, Echoing Green President. “It takes courage and grace to work alongside someone who fundamentally disagrees with you. Through ESF’s community service programs they are engaging in work everyone can agree on and be passionate about. Mr. Staples and his organization are creating a common ground, a new tool in creating social justice.”

== Community involvement ==
Staples also currently serves on several large non-profit nationally based governing boards, including as Secretary to the board of directors of the Department of Defense Federal Globe, and on the board of directors of the National Women Veterans Association of America. He also served on Lori Saldana's, former member of the California State Assembly from the 76th Assembly district, Hate Free San Diego Commission as he consulted with representatives of San Diego businesses to foster programs to end hate crimes. He's also a voting member of the San Diego LGBT Center's Community Leadership Council, and he serves on the Public Policy Advisory Committee.

== Political involvement ==
Staples has worked on several political campaigns, including those of former vice president Al Gore, Hillary Clinton, San Diego Schoolboard Vice-president Kevin Beiser, and former Congressman and former San Diego Mayor Bob Filner, and he served as political adviser to California 50th district Democratic candidate Tracy Emblem. Staples also currently serves on the San Diego LGBT Community Center Public Policy Action Committee and the Center for Leadership Committee.
