= Tracy Butler =

Tracy Butler may refer to:

- Tracy Butler, co-writer of the 1969 film Changes
- Tracy Butler (gymnast), artistic gymnast and bronze medal winner in the 1983 Pan American Games
- Tracy Butler (artist), comic artist and game developer, creator of the 2000s webcomic Lackadaisy

== See also ==
- Tracy (given name)
- Butler (surname)
