= Empowering Spirits Foundation =

American non-profit organization

- The ESF logo symbolizing a ring of unity.
- Formation: 2008
- Headquarters: San Diego, California, United States
- President: Lisa Kove
- Key people: A. Latham Staples, Chairman
- Website: web.archive.org/web/20090727074911/http://www.empoweringspirits.org:80/

The Empowering Spirits Foundation (ESF), Inc. is an American non-profit, non-partisan LGBT rights organization based in San Diego, California, United States.

Empowering Spirits Foundation Rally in San Diego, California

The Foundation is based in San Diego with chapters in other U.S. states. ESF members engage in service-oriented activities in communities typically opposed to LGBT rights.

ESF programs include neighborhood revitalization, housing builds, canned food drives, and environmental cleanup, causes which allow for both sides to work together in what ESF calls a "positive environment". The programs take place in under-served areas or those conservative in nature, as these are the people ESF is attempting to influence.

Additionally, ESF is active in U.S. politics.

== History and leadership ==
The Empowering Spirits Foundation was established by A. Latham Staples in 2008 after the passage of Proposition 8 in California out of frustration as to how he thought LGBT rights organizations were approaching the gay rights issue.

Staples said, "The day after the passage of Proposition 8, various gay rights organizations attacked Christians, the LDS Church, and minority groups. In my mind, this intolerance only amplified the hate, it didn't create change". Staples, a long time activist, was laughed at when he suggested to one of those organizations that the LGBT community should foster dialogue with such groups instead of attacking them. Four days later, ESF was established.

In 2009 Echoing Green, an angel investor in social entrepreneurial organizations, announced it would fund ESF for two years. ESF was the only grantee selected from the category of "Civil & Human Rights" when Staples was named a 2010 Echoing Green fellow for "enacting innovative solutions that address root causes to social problems."

On March 4, 2013, ESF announced Staples had stepped down as president of the organization as he had accepted the position of chief executive officer at PremloCare, Inc. (later renamed EXUSMED, Inc.), a healthcare company based in San Diego. He remains the chairman of ESF. Today, ESF is headed by Lisa Kove, current president of the foundation and Executive Director of the Department of Defense Federal Globe.

=== Catholic Diocese of Portland, Maine ===
In May 2009, the Empowering Spirits Foundation filed a complaint with the Internal Revenue Service to seek revocation of the Roman Catholic Diocese of Portland's tax exempt status. This complaint was filed after Mark Mutty, the Diocese's public affairs director, announced plans for the church to gather 55,087 signatures needed for a state referendum on same-sex marriage in an attempt to overturn Maine's new same-sex marriage law. Mutty is quoted as calling the church's action "one of the biggest grassroots movements in Maine history."

Erik Stanley, senior counsel for the Alliance Defense Fund, responding on behalf of the Roman Catholic Diocese of Portland, stated in a letter to ESF that the IRS allows tax-exempt organizations to "engage in lobbying activities, including advocating a position on a public referendum, without violating their tax-exempt status so long as the activity is not a substantial activity of the organization."

== Events ==
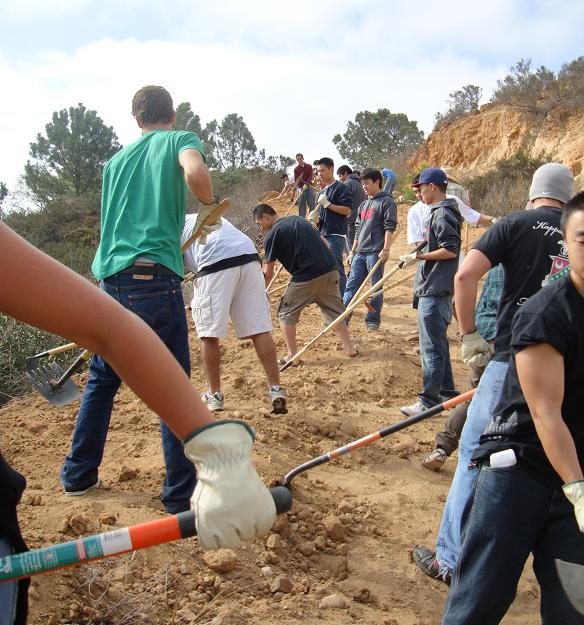
ESF volunteers build a new trail in the Gonzalez Canyon in San Diego, California.

Empowering Spirits Foundation members engage in service-oriented activities in communities throughout the nation. These events range from small events at nursing homes and food banks, neighborhood clean-up endeavors, and neighborhood restoration projects, to participation in large citywide rallies.

=== Proud Hearts Reach Out ===
The Empowering Spirits Foundation held its first annual nationwide service-oriented event to promote LGBT rights called "Proud Hearts Reach Out" in conjunction with National Coming Out Day October 9, 2009. The nationwide event was created in response to the California Supreme Court decision to uphold Proposition 8. Roughly 5,000 volunteers attended the ESF service events held across 36 states, in partnership with Habitat for Humanity, MyOutSpirit.com, the American Cancer Society, and the Lymphoma and Leukemia Society.

=== National Equality Rally ===
The Empowering Spirits Foundation, along with other LGBT organizations, co-organized the National Equality Rally which took place from April 27 through May 3, 2009, in Philadelphia, Pennsylvania. The rally featured a series of cultural programs, panels, parties and outdoor events, and a tribute to San Francisco Mayor Gavin Newsom, who is a proponent of gay rights.
