= Herbert Lloyd (disambiguation) =

Herbert Lloyd was an Australian soldier and politician.

Herbert Lloyd may also refer to:

- Sir Herbert Lloyd, 1st Baronet (1719–1769), Welsh politician
- H. S. Lloyd (Herbert Summers Lloyd, 1887–1963), breeder of show English Cocker Spaniels
