= Secrets of the Baby Whisperer =

2001 book by Tracy Hogg and Melinda Blau

Secrets of the Baby Whisperer: How to Calm, Connect, and Communicate with Your Baby is a 2001 book by Tracy Hogg and Melinda Blau, aimed at guiding new parents through their baby's first year. It was published by Ballantine Books.

The book has become a bestseller upon its release.

The main concept promoted by the author is to build a flexible routine for babies, from a very early age, of eating, followed by activity, followed by sleep. The routine is based on the baby's needs and is not a schedule dictated by the parent. The author's attitude towards sleeping is that a child should be taught to sleep in her own bed and to learn to calm herself, with gradually decreasing amounts of assistance from her parents. The author presents this as the sensible compromise between the Ferber method of leaving a child to cry in bed, and the co-sleeping approach where a child is allowed in his parents' bed, if the parents so choose. The author does not recommend leaving a child to "cry it out" or using controlled crying, but encourages parents to learn to recognise a child's cries and respond to them appropriately.
