= Luckystar of Ware =

English Cocker Spaniel

- Species: Dog
- Breed: English Cocker Spaniel
- Sex: Male
- Nationality: British
- Occupation: Show dog
- Title: Best In Show at Crufts
- Term: 1930-32
- Predecessor: Heather Necessity (Scottish Terrier)
- Successor: Bramshaw Bob (Labrador Retriever)
- Owner: H. S. Lloyd
- Parents: Joyful Joe (sire); Wildflower of Ware (dam)

Luckystar of Ware, was a male English Cocker Spaniel who won the title of Best In Show at Cruft's in both 1930 and 1931. He was the first dog to retain the title, and the first of three dogs owned by H. S. Lloyd to win the Cruft's Best in Show title, including Tracey Witch of Ware, the granddaughter of Luckystar.

== Show history ==
Luckystar was sired by Joyful Joe from Wildflower of Ware, and was owned by H. S. Lloyd. Luckystar's prize tally as a puppy was a total of 135 first places in conformation shows, including eight challenge certificates.

At Cruft's in 1930, Luckystar won the Sporting Group and qualified for the Best in Show round. There he faced the reigning champion, the Scottish Terrier Heather Necessity, along with the King Charles Spaniel Ch. Ashton-More Wild Flowers, the Chow Chow Choonham Brilliancy, the Cairn Terrier Dochfour Timothy and the Greyhound, Pilot of Devoir. The judges in the Best in Show round had a problem with deciding which dog should be the winner. It came down to Heather Necessity and Luckystar of Ware. The judges cast lots, but this resulted in a dead heat. Theo Marples stepped in to act as the referee and make the deciding vote, with Luckystar named the winner.

The following year at Cruft's, Luckystar once again qualified for Best in Show after winning the Sporting Group. The judges this time had no trouble, and the spaniel was once again named Best in Show, with the Pointer Nancolleth Markable placed in reserve. Luckystar was the first of three dogs from the "of Ware" kennel to win Best in Show at Crufts twice. The other two dogs were Exquisite Model of Ware and after the Second World War, Tracey Witch of Ware.

Between 1929 and 1931 alone, Luckystar won a total of ten Best in Show titles in various shows around the United Kingdom. His career prize tally was 367 first places at conformation shows, including 32 challenge certificates during his show career.

== Legacy ==
Luckystar sired six dogs who went on to win challenge certificates, and was the grandsire to another H. S. Lloyd owned Cocker Spaniel who repeated the Cruft's double. Tracey Witch of Ware won a total of 52 challenge certificates, and was Best in Show at Cruft's twice in 1948 and 1950, and was Reserve Best in Show on a further occasion. Royal Doulton produced a ceramic figurine of Luckystar measuring 17 centimetres (6.7 in) wide.
