= Tahoe Reno Industrial Center =

Industrial park in Nevada, US

Coordinates: 39.5416°N 119.4858°W

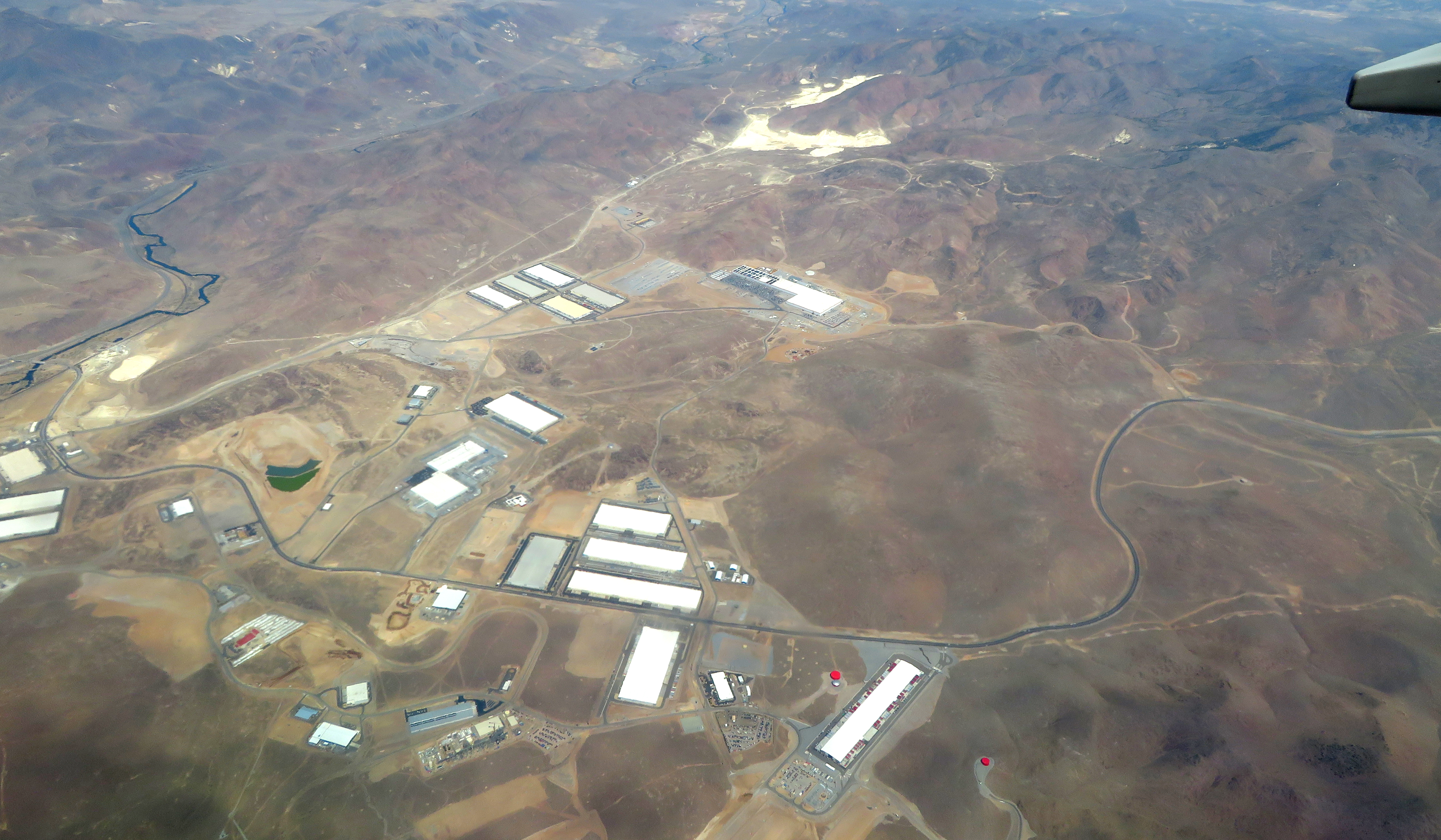
Tahoe Reno Industrial Center in April 2021

The Tahoe Reno Industrial Center (TRI Center, or TRIC) is a privately owned 107,000-acre (167 sq mi; 430 km^{2}) industrial park, located in Storey County, east of Reno, Nevada, and south of Interstate 80. The center is the largest in the United States (third largest in the world), occupying over half of the land mass in Storey County, and is home to more than a hundred companies and their warehouse logistics centers and fulfillment centers such as PetSmart, Home Depot, Walmart and others. Gigafactory Nevada was built there to serve Tesla, Inc. and Panasonic. According to Benchmarkia, Tahoe-Reno Industrial Centre is the sixth largest industrial park by area in the world.

Facilities include rail-serviced sites with the Union Pacific Railroad and BNSF Railway, municipal water and sewer, natural gas service, and five power plants on site producing more than 900 megawatts (1,200,000 hp).

== History ==
In 1995, Storey County saw an opportunity in the open area close to rail and highway, but isolated from residential areas to avoid disturbance. Mars/PetSmart became the first tenant. In 2020, TRIC was one of the areas depicted in the art exhibition "Countryside, The Future" by architect Rem Koolhaas at the New York Guggenheim Museum.

=== Private extension ===
In 1998, private developers bought 102,000 acres of the adjacent Asamera ranch (formerly McCarran ranch) from Gulf Canada for $20 million cash, and the area was zoned as "I-2 Heavy Industrial" in 2000, including retail. About 30,000 acres are developable. It operates as a public–private partnership, where the owners provide $5 million for the county to support TRIC. The owners also built infrastructure such as roads, rail, gas, power, water, and sewer, and are reimbursed with 35% of the tax paid by the tenant companies to the county. The owners built the six-mile, four-lane USA Parkway between TRIC and I-80 for $60 million in 2007 as the second access, along with rail spur.

In 2009 TRIC had 4,500 employees on 11 million sq ft of buildings, growing to 14 million sq ft in 2014, and 5,000 employees in 2015, increasing to over 18,000 employees by 2018. The additions have contributed to economic activity in the Reno area. The Nevada Department of Transportation (NDOT) took over USA Parkway for $43 million in 2015, extending it for $70 million to U.S. Route 50 to cope with projected increasing traffic.

=== Construction ===
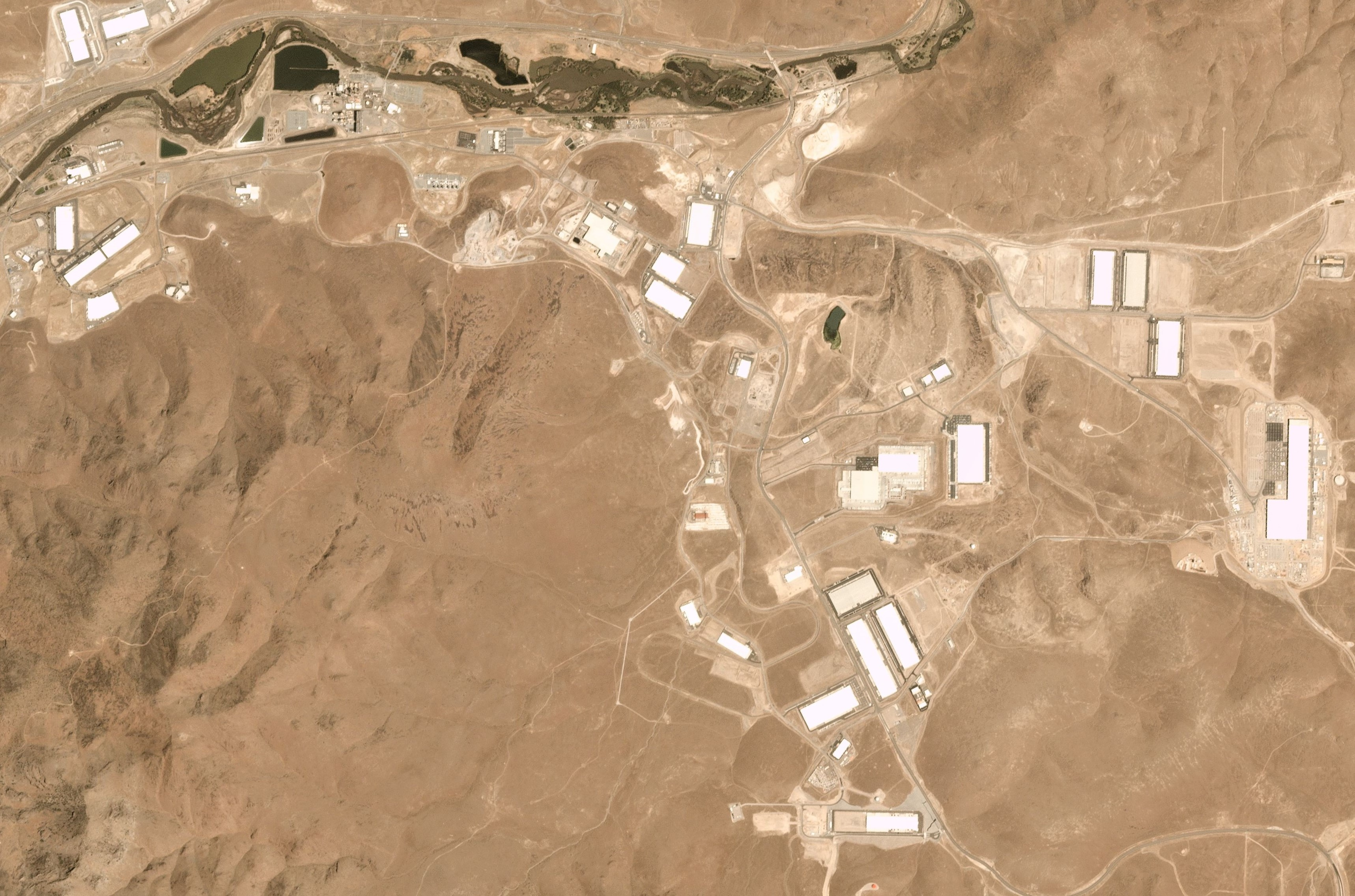
Main parts of TRI, 2017

Switch opened a 130 MW data center in 2017, with plans for 650 MW on its 2,000-acre site. It is scheduled to occupy 7.2 million square feet and cost $4 billion, with the aim of being Tier 5-approved.

A 91-unit Studio 6 Hotel started construction in 2017. A Courtyard by Marriott is scheduled nearby.

In 2017, Google purchased 1,200 acres of land for $26.1 million, to be used as a data center. Construction was underway in 2019.

In 2018, Blockchains bought 67,000 acres for a cryptocurrency-powered libertarian city.

=== Top employers ===
Incomplete list, sorted by number of employees.

Employer	2016	2017	2019
Gigafactory total	850	3000	7,557
Tesla			5,540
Panasonic		1200	1,825
Heitkamp & Thumann			192
Walmart (Distribution)	600-699		
Zulily	500–599		
Thrive Market	218		
James Hardie	100-199		
