= The Baby Whisperer =

The Baby Whisperer is a fifteen-part Discovery Home and Health TV series presented by Tracy Hogg (The Baby Whisperer).

== Episode guide ==
1. Baby Ella - Tracy Hogg helps a baby and her parents break the association between food and sleep.
2. Baby James - Tracy Hogg is called in to help baby James sleep for longer when his parents complain that he keeps them awake all night.
3. Caitlin Hall - Fifteen-month-old Caitlin will not eat solids, so Tracy Hogg suggests how to wean her off milk.
4. Dexter Powell - Dexter Powell is 19 months old and has trouble controlling his temper to the point that he hurts himself.
5. Elizabeth Wilkinson - A woman worries about not producing enough milk to breastfeed her newborn.
6. Hamish Frost - Baby whisperer Tracy Hogg visits a mother who is finding it difficult to care for her premature baby.
7. Harvey and Olly Spence - Baby Olly will not stop crying after he is fed, and the baby whisperer tries to figure out the problem.
8. Jane's Holly - Baby James will not sleep at night and his parents need help from Tracy, the baby whisperer.
9. Leanne O'Condell - A mother-to-be is worried at the thought of breastfeeding, so Tracy Hogg tries to reassure her by offering guidelines.
10. Mackenzie Hartwell - An infant cannot stay asleep, so his parents call in a baby whisperer to help them get a good night's rest.
11. Max Brown - A toddler is rough with his baby brother, so Tracy Hogg helps him and his mother adjust to life with the new arrival.
12. Primrose Lennon - Baby Primrose will not take a bottle and her mother is reaching the end of her tether, prompting a visit from Tracy Hogg.
13. Sophia Calkins - Baby Sophia refuses to be weaned off breast-feeding, so Tracy Hogg comes up with a solution to encourage her to eat solids.
14. Tia Ratnavira - An infant will not stop crying unless she is held by her mother, so her parents call in an expert to solve the problem.
15. Xavier Blore - Baby Xavier's parents hide anxiously in the kitchen to avoid waking him, until Tracy Hogg arrives to offer suggestions on how their child should be treated.
