= Exquisite Model of Ware =

Female English Cocker Spaniel

- Species: Dog
- Breed: English Cocker Spaniel
- Sex: Female
- Born: Brunette of Hubbastone; 9 July 1935
- Nationality: British
- Occupation: Show dog
- Title: Best in Show at Crufts
- Term: 1938-1940
- Predecessor: Ch. Cheveralla Ben of Banchory (Labrador Retriever)
- Successor: Tracey Witch of Ware (English Cocker Spaniel)
- Owner: H. S. Lloyd
- Parents: Whoopee of Ware (sire); Jane of Hubbastone (dam)
- Appearance: Tricolor coat

Exquisite Model of Ware (born 9 July 1935) was a female English Cocker Spaniel who won the title of Best in Show at Crufts in both 1938 and 1939. She was the most successful female English Cocker Spaniel in Great Britain prior to the Second World War.

== Show career ==
Exquisite Model was born on 9 July 1935 and first registered as Brunette of Hubbastone. She was bred by Mr. & Mrs. C. C. D. Youings, and sired by Whoopee of Ware from the dam Jane of Hubbastone. She was subsequently purchased by H. S. Lloyd of the "of Ware" kennel, where she was renamed Exquisite Model of Ware, the name under which she later became well known.

In 1938, Exquisite Model was entered in the Crufts dog show, her sire having been named as Reserve Best in Show during the year of her birth. She was awarded Best in Show over the Great Dane Ch. Ruler of Ouborough. It was the final show run by Charles Cruft prior to his death.

At The Kennel Club national show in 1939, she defeated fellow "of Ware" dog Sir Galahad of Ware for the title of Best of Breed, before going on to take the Best in Show title. She went on to win Best in Show at Cruft's for the second time, becoming the second dog of Lloyds' to do so. Ch. Choonam Hung Kwong was placed in Reserve, who had previously won Best in Show in 1937. It was the 24th Best in Show of Exquisite Model's career. Also in 1939, she was Reserve Best in Show at the Cocker Spaniel Club of Ireland's championship show.

During her career, she had great success at the Cocker Spaniel Club of Great Britain's championship shows, winning the title of Best in Show for three years running prior to the Second World War. Her sire, Whoopee of Ware, had also won the title for the three years prior to that. She set the record for the number of challenge certificates won by an English Cocker Spaniel bitch prior to the Second World War, with a total of 53 certificates. That record was only beaten by Whoopee, who won a total of 56 certificates, however Whoopee never won Best in Show at Crufts. As of 2008, she was the fourth most successful British English Cocker Spaniel of all time. Exquisite Model was one of three "of Ware" dogs to win Cruft's twice, the other two being Luckystar of Ware and Tracey Witch of Ware.
