= Tracy LaQuey Parker =

Canadian-American businesswoman

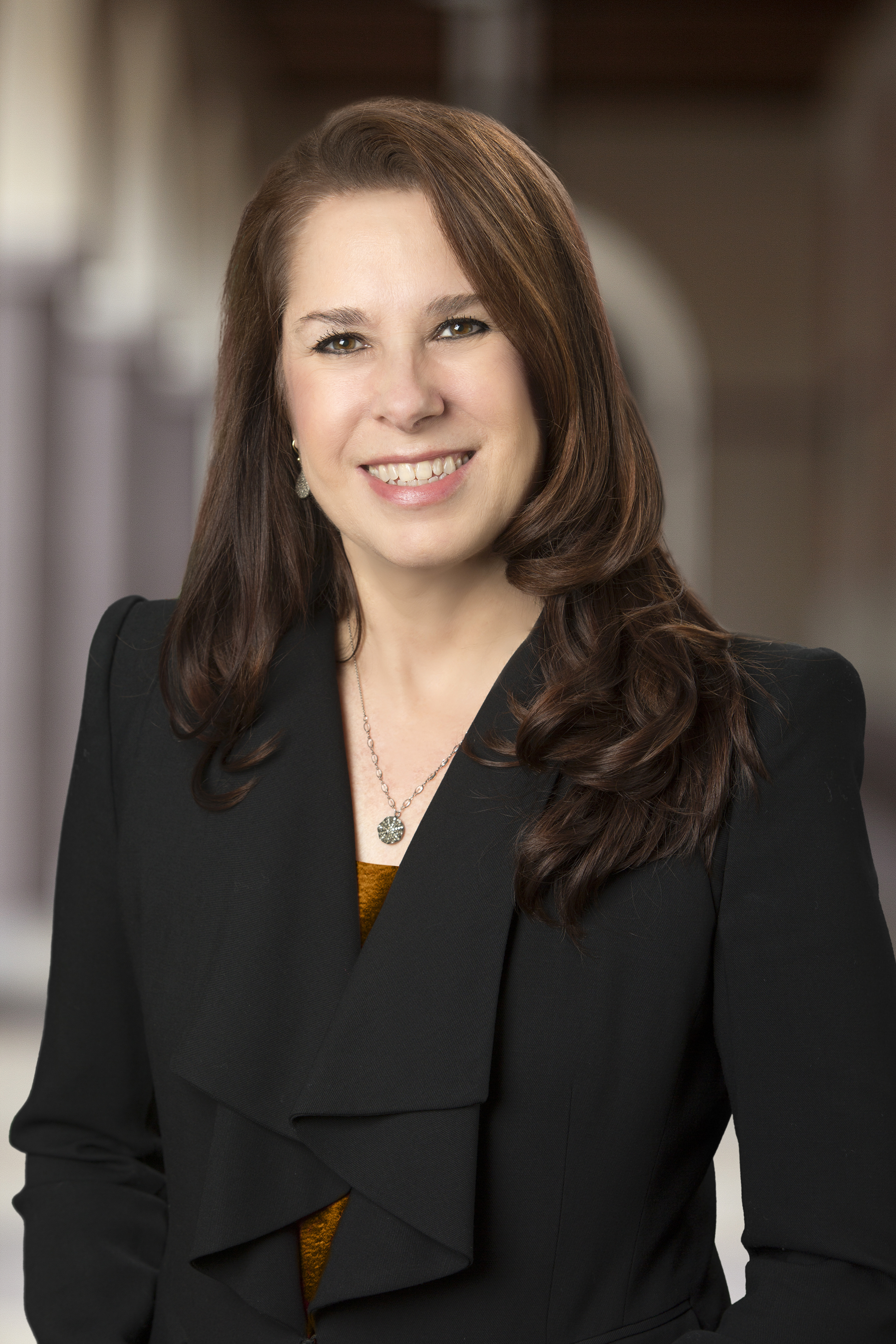
Tracy LaQuey Parker in 2014

Tracy LaQuey Parker is a Canadian-American businesswoman. She is the senior vice president at Parker Solutions Group. Before joining the company, LaQuey Parker worked for Cisco as a chief technology officer and started The UTeach Institute. Apart from her career, LaQuey Parker became the first person to win a lawsuit against a spammer and was inducted into the Internet Hall of Fame in 2017.

== Early life and education ==
LaQuey Parker was born in Newfoundland on a United States Air Force base. After moving to Texas, she went to the University of Texas at Austin for a Bachelor of Arts degree and specialized in computer science.

== Career ==
In 1988, she started working for the University of Texas with the Texas Higher Education Network. While with the university, she was a part of the Texas Education Network in 1991 that connected Texan teachers to the Internet. She left the university to work with Cisco Systems as a chief technology officer. While at Cisco, she was in charge of projects that introduced the Internet to schools globally. After creating The UTeach Institute in 2006, LaQuey Parker went to Parker Solutions Group and became the Senior Vice President of the Business Development department.

Apart from her technological career, LaQuey Parker authored The User's Directory of Computer Networks in 1988 and The Internet Companion in 1992. In May 1997, LaQuey Parker was the lead plaintiff in a spamming lawsuit. In the case, LaQuey Parker sued defendant Craig Nowak after he used her company website via email spoofing to send spam emails. As a result, LaQuey Parker received over five thousand emails ranging from hate mail to bounced messages between March 31 and April 1, 1997. After a November 1997 Texas District Court verdict ruled in favor of LaQuey Parker, she became the first person to win a lawsuit against a spammer.

== Awards and honors ==
In 2017, LaQuey Parker was inducted into the Internet Hall of Fame.
