= H. S. Lloyd =

- H. S. Lloyd, pictured here with three dogs from his "of Ware" kennel including Luckystar of Ware, two-time winner of Best in Show (pictured middle)
- Born: Herbert Summers Lloyd; 1 April 1887
- Died: 26 January 1963 (aged 75)
- Children: Jennifer Lloyd Carey
- Parent: Richard Lloyd

Herbert Summers Lloyd MBE (1 April 1887 – 26 January 1963) was an English dog breeder of show English Cocker Spaniels. He remains the most successful breeder/owner at Crufts, having won Best in Show on six occasions in the 1930s and 1940s.

== Early life ==
Born on 1 April 1887, his father Richard Lloyd was a dog breeder considered to be one of the founding fathers of the English Cocker Spaniel. Once he left school, he became an apprentice to a printer; however after two years in the trade, he left to pursue his love for dogs.

== Cocker Spaniels ==
In 1906, Lloyd adopted the "of Ware" kennel suffix, named after Ware, Hertfordshire where the original kennels were located.

He and the "of Ware" kennels eventually moved to Swakeleys Farm, Ickenham, Middlesex. He won his first Best in Show at Crufts in 1930 with Luckystar of Ware. It was only the third time the award had been handed out, and was the first occasion on which a Gundog had taken the title. In 1931, Lloyd and Luckystar repeated the victory, again taking Best in Show. It was the first occasion where the title had been retained by the previous year's winner. Countess Lorna Howe would repeat this in the following two years, taking the title with her Labrador Retriever, Bramshaw Bob.

In 1938, Lloyd again won Best in Show at Crufts, this time with his dog Exquisite Model of Ware, and then repeated the victory again in 1939. By the time Crufts was due to take place in 1940, the competition had been suspended due to World War II. The War Office appointed Lloyd as a technical advisor and the head trainer at a school for war dogs during the war, including training detection dog and handlers. For his service to the war effort, he was made a Member of the Order of the British Empire.

In 1948, he was one of the founder members of the Home Counties Cocker Club, donating a trophy for best novice of any colour. In the same year Crufts took place for the first time since the war, and again Lloyd won Best in Show, this time with Tracey Witch of Ware. The competition was suspended in 1949 during the handover of the competition from the Cruft family to The Kennel Club, it resumed in 1950, and Lloyd was victorious for his sixth and final time once again with Tracey Witch of Ware. Due to the two periods of suspended competition, Lloyd had won every Best in Show at Crufts between 1938 and 1950. The English Cocker Spaniel remains the most successful breed at Crufts, mainly due to Lloyd's victories – it has only won once more, in 1996 by Sh Ch. Canigou Cambrai.

== Later life ==
In 1959, he donated a trophy to the Cocker Spaniel Club of Ireland. Called the "of Ware Cup", it was awarded between 1959 and 1967 for the Best Limit Dog in the Club's annual show. From 1968 onwards it was awarded for the Best Limit Dog or Bitch, and since 2009 it has been given to the Best Puppy in Show.

In retirement he moved to "Ware Cottage", in Maple Cross, Hertfordshire near Rickmansworth. He died on 26 January 1963.

== Personal life ==
His daughter, Jennifer Lloyd Carey, like her father and grandfather became a breeder of English Cocker Spaniels. At the age of 11 in 1948 she attended Crufts for the first time at the show where H.S. Lloyd's Tracey Witch of Ware won Best in Show. As of 2011, she became the longest-running Crufts competitor, having shown dogs at the competition for the first time in 1950.

== Bibliography ==
- The Popular Cocker Spaniel. London: Popular Dogs. 1924.
- Cocker Spaniels. London: W. and G. Foyles. 1957.
