= Tracy Brogan =

American novelist

Tracy Brogan is an American author of historical and contemporary women's fiction.

Brogan is a three-time recipient of the Amazon Publishing Diamond award for sales exceeding three million copies, a three-time finalist for the Romance Writers of America (RWA) RITA award for excellence in romantic fiction, and a three-time winner of the Booksellers Best award.

Her debut novel, a romantic comedy titled Crazy Little Thing, was nominated for Best First Book by RWA and sold in excess of 1.5 million copies worldwide.

Known more for her comedic twist on the romance genre, Brogan is also the author of the bestselling Highland Surrender and is currently working on a light-hearted historical series featuring the Bostwick brothers of Trillium Bay set in the 1880s. Inspired by Michigan's Mackinac Island and the island's Grand Hotel, Art of the Chase was scheduled for release on September 12, 2023.

Brogan lives in Michigan and writes stories about fictional versions of all the places she loves to visit.

== Bibliography ==
=== Contemporary/Women's fiction ===
==== Bell Harbor Series ====
- Crazy Little Thing (2012)
- The Best Medicine (2014)
- Love Me Sweet (2015)
- Jingle Bell Harbor ((2015)

Trillium Bay Series

- My Kind of You (2017)
- My Kind of Forever (2019)
- My Kind of Perfect (2021)

Trillium Bay Historical Series

- Art of the Chase (2023)
- Magic of Moonlight (2024
- Daisy in the Garden (2025)

Standalone novels

- Hold on My Heart (2013)
- The New Normal (2020)
- Weather or Knot ((2020)

=== Historical romance ===
- Highland Surrender
