= Tracey Witch of Ware =

English Cocker Spaniel

- Species: Dog
- Breed: English Cocker Spaniel
- Sex: Female
- Nationality: British
- Occupation: Show dog
- Title: Best In Show at Crufts
- Term: 1948-1951
- Predecessor: Exquisite Model of Ware (English Cocker Spaniel)
- Successor: Twynstar Dyma-Fi (Welsh Terrier)
- Owner: H. S. Lloyd
- Parents: Falconers Padlock of Ware (sire); Whist (dam)
- Appearance: Blue roan coat

Tracey Witch of Ware was a female English Cocker Spaniel who won the title of Best In Show at Cruft's in both 1948 and 1950. She missed out on the Best in Show judging in 1952 because of a delay in breed judging, and also became Reserve Best in Show in 1953. She was a descendant of a previous Cruft's Best in Show winner, Luckystar of Ware.

== Show career ==
Tracey Witch was bred by Denise Weldon from the sire Falconers Padlock of Ware and the dam Whist. She was a descendant of the previous Cruft's Best in Show winner Luckystar of Ware and Reserve Best in Show winner Whoopee of Ware. Tracey Witch was subsequently purchased by H. S. Lloyd, owner of the "of Ware" kennels.

Following the Second World War, Cruft's resumed in 1948. At the time there was a Reserve Best in Show named for each of the two days of competition with the winner of the first day going forward to compete once more on the second day. Tracey Witch was named the best of the dogs shown on the second day and faced the Wire Fox Terrier Drakehall Dairymaid for the title of Best in Show. Judges May Pacey and Arthur Coxton Smith awarded the title to Tracey Witch. Such was the rush of the crowds to congratulate owner Bert Lloyd, that Tracey Witch was given a police escort.

There had been no event run in 1949 as the date changed from October to February in 1950. In 1950, she again won the breed class and the Sporting Group, and was once more named Best in Show. In 1951, she lost in the Best of Breed, defeated by fellow "of Ware" dog, Joywyns Blueboy of Ware. The following year she won the Best of Breed title once again, but by the time the judging was completed for the English Cocker Spaniels, Best in Show had already been judged and awarded to the Bulldog, Ch. Noways Chuckles. This resulted in several protests from the spectators, and the Cruft's officials attempted to find a solution but couldn't find a way for Tracey Witch to face Noways Chuckles in the ring.

In 1953, she returned to Cruft's once more at the age of eight. She again won Best of Breed, and the Gundog Group. Tracey Witch was awarded reserve overall for the first day, with the Great Dane Ch. Elch Elder of Ouborough named as the victor on each of the two days and awarded the title of Best in Show. During the course of her career, Tracey Witch of Ware won a total of 52 challenge certificates. She was H. S. Lloyds' most successful dog, having won Best in Show on thirteen occasions at all-breed championship shows.

== Legacy ==
A statuette was created of Tracey Witch by sculptor Frederick Thomas Daws. The original was presented to Lloyd in 1951 to commemorate Tracey Witch's second Cruft's victory. Copies were made and used by Spratt's for promotional purposes.

== Pedigree ==
Whoopee of Ware
Manxman of Ware
Devotion of Lewaigue
Sir Galahad of Ware
Silver Flare of Ware
Falconers Confidence
Falconers Caution
Falconers Padlock of Ware
Deebanks Marcus
Silver Flare of Ware
Baxter Betty
Falconers Careful
Cobnar Critic
Falconers Caution
Falconers Cowslip
Tracey Witch of Ware
Cobnar Critic
Joyful Joe
Dove Moor Jennie
Luckystar of Ware
Invader of Ware
Wildflower of Ware
Blue Rocket
Whist
Whoopee of Ware
Jester of Halford
Lady Gay of Ottervale
Tinsel of Swinbrook
