= Tracey Holloway =

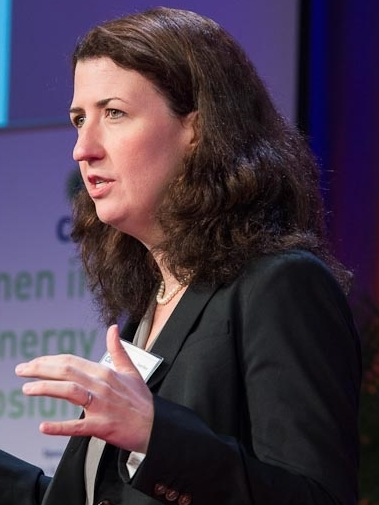
- Tracey Holloway at the Women in Clean Energy Symposium, 2012
- Education: Brown University; Princeton University

Tracey Holloway is the Jeff Rudd and Jeanne Bissell Professor of Energy Analysis and Policy at the Nelson Institute for Environmental Studies at the University of Wisconsin-Madison and Department of Atmospheric and Ocean Sciences. Her research focuses on the links between regional air quality, energy, and climate through the use of computer models and data from satellites.

Holloway earned a bachelor's degree in applied math from Brown University and PhD in atmospheric and oceanic sciences from Princeton University in 2001. She was a postdoctoral scholar at the Earth Institute at Columbia University. She currently also serves as the team leader for the NASA Health and Air Quality Applied Science Team (HAQAST), a national initiative since 2011 to broaden utilization of NASA data for public health and air quality management. She is also the chair of the Energy Analysis and Policy (EAP) graduate certificate program in the Nelson Institute Holloway was one of five women who founded Earth Science Women's Network (ESWN) in 2002, which as of 2017 had around 3,000 members. She is a founding member of Science Moms, a nonpartisan science outreach effort focused on combating climate change.

Holloway served as Leopold Fellow in 2011, a AAAS, received the first MIT Clean Energy Education and Empowerment Award in Education and Mentoring in 2018, and was a Leshner Leadership Fellow in 2016–2017.

In May 2017, she co-authored a study in Environmental Science & Technology that associated increased air conditioning use with increased levels of nitrogen oxides, sulfur dioxide, and carbon dioxide in the air.

In 2022, she was elected to the National Academy of Medicine for her work connecting air quality research with public health. On February 11th, she received the Slesinger Award for Excellence in Mentoring for her work mentoring women.

In 2025, Holloway was one of 52 people in the 2025 Class of Fellows who got elected a Fellow of the American Geophysical Union. According to AGU, she was chosen for leadership and scientific achievements that advanced understanding of air quality analysis and policy.
