= Tracy Hogg =

British nurse and author

Hogg, Tracy
- Born: August 1960; Doncaster, West Riding of Yorkshire, England
- Died: 25 November 2004 (aged 44); Doncaster, South Yorkshire, England
- Occupations: Nurse-midwife, celebrity nanny, author

Tracy Hogg, RNMH (August 1960 – 25 November 2004) was a British nurse and bestselling author. Her experiences as a nurse at St. Catherine's Hospital for the Mentally Handicapped and other hospitals led to a career as a child care expert. She was nicknamed "the baby whisperer" for her ability to placate colicky infants. Hogg emigrated to the United States in 1992 and became famous in her last years for guiding young parents in California, among them Jodie Foster, Cindy Crawford, Jamie Lee Curtis, and Calista Flockhart. Her fee for three weeks of babysitting was said to be over $15,000.

Her first book, Secrets of the Baby Whisperer: How To Calm, Connect, and Communicate With Your Baby, co-authored by journalist Melinda Blau, was published in 2001. It became a New York Times bestseller. One year later, Secrets of the Baby Whisperer for Toddlers was published and became a national bestseller as well.

In June 2002, Hogg teamed up with Discovery Health in Great Britain to produce a fifteen-part television series entitled The Baby Whisperer. In 2004, as she was battling cancer, Hogg and Blau collaborated on The Baby Whisperer Solves All Your Problems. Hogg died of melanoma on 25 November 2004, aged 44, in her native Doncaster, England.

== Books ==
- Secrets of the Baby Whisperer, 2001, ISBN 978-0-345-47909-9
- Secrets of the Baby Whisperer for Toddlers, 2002, ISBN 978-0-345-44092-1
- The Baby Whisperer Solves all your Problems, 2005, ISBN 978-0091902513

== TV shows ==
- The Baby Whisperer
