= Tracey Shors =

American neuroscientist

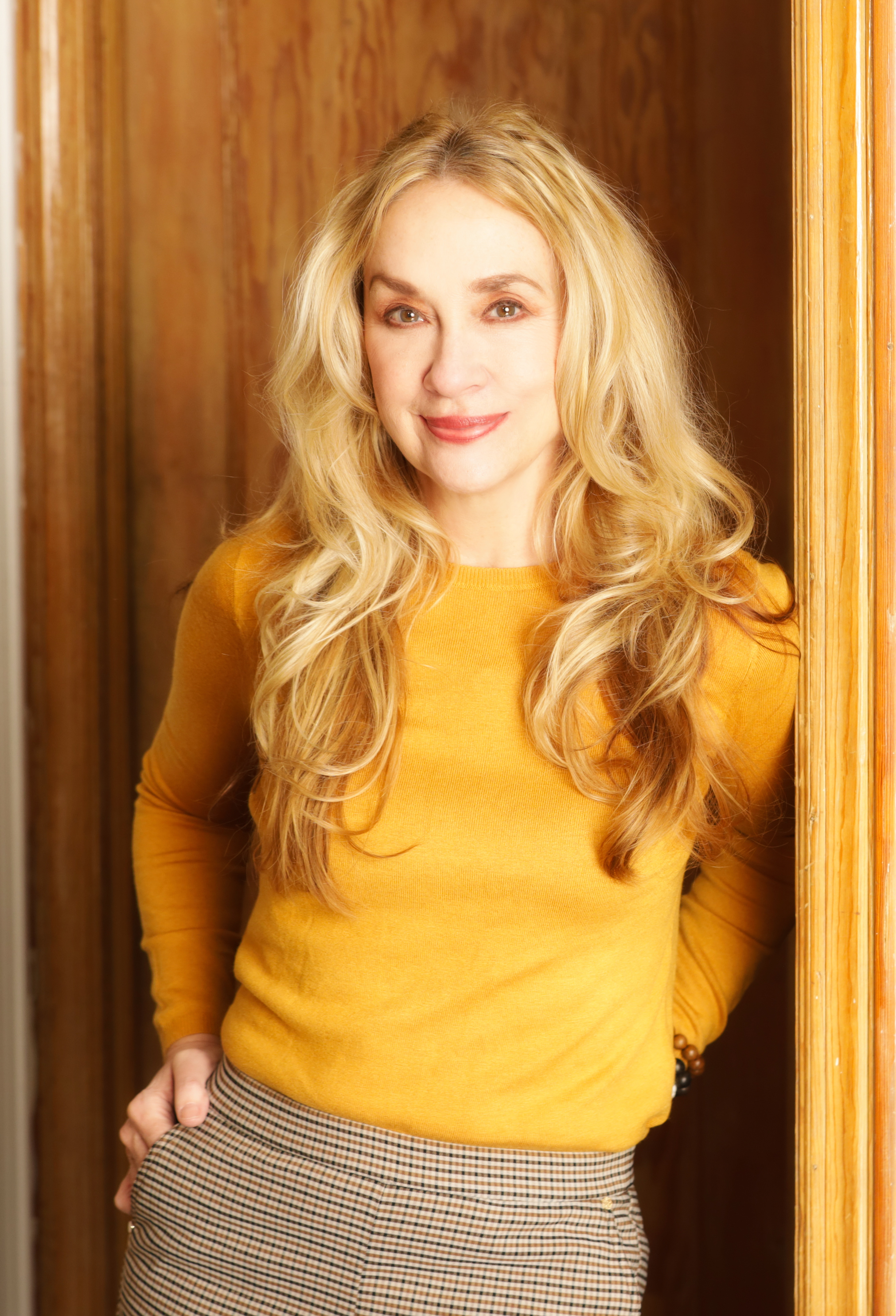
- Shors in 2018
- Education: University of Alabama; University of Southern California
- Known for: Research on trauma, memory, neurogenesis
- Scientific career
- Fields: Psychology and Neuroscience
- Institutions: Rutgers University

Tracey Shors is a neuroscientist and distinguished professor in behavioral neuroscience, systems neuroscience, and psychology as well as a member of the Center for Collaborative Neuroscience at Rutgers University. She is currently vice chair and director of graduate studies in the department of psychology.

Shors was involved in the initial studies on neurogenesis. Also, she developed MAP Training (Mental And Physical Training), which combines mental training with meditation and physical training with aerobic exercise.

== Career ==
Shors received her doctorate from the University of Southern California. She continued with postdoctoral training at USC and worked at Princeton University and Genentech before joining the faculty at Rutgers University in 1998.

She is a distinguished professor in behavioral neuroscience, systems neuroscience, and psychology as well as a member of the Center for Collaborative Neuroscience at Rutgers University. She is currently vice chair and director of graduate studies in the department of psychology.

=== Neurogenesis ===
Shors was involved in the initial studies on neurogenesis. Her lab at Rutgers in collaboration with Elizabeth Gould's lab at Princeton, were the first to report that new neurons in the hippocampus are involved in processes of learning and memory. She also conducted early research on sex differences in the brain and how they may contribute to the high incidence of depression, anxiety and PTSD in women.

=== MAP Training ===
Based on her research, she developed MAP Training (Mental And Physical Training). MAP Training combines mental training with meditation and physical training with aerobic exercise. Since 2012, her lab has been providing MAP Training to people with depression, trauma history, anxiety and HIV, as well as those living with the stress and trauma of everyday life. They have documented positive outcomes in both mental and physical health. Specifically, her lab reported that the combination of meditation and aerobic exercise can lessen depression, anxiety and traumatic thoughts about the past. The combination was also reported to increase whole body oxygen consumption, synchronized brain activity, and self-worth. Her studies further determined that doing both activities together was better than doing either mediation or aerobic exercise alone. Shors is currently writing a book about trauma and the brain with Flatiron Press/MacMillan to be published in spring of 2021.
