= Tracy A. Henke =

American former government official

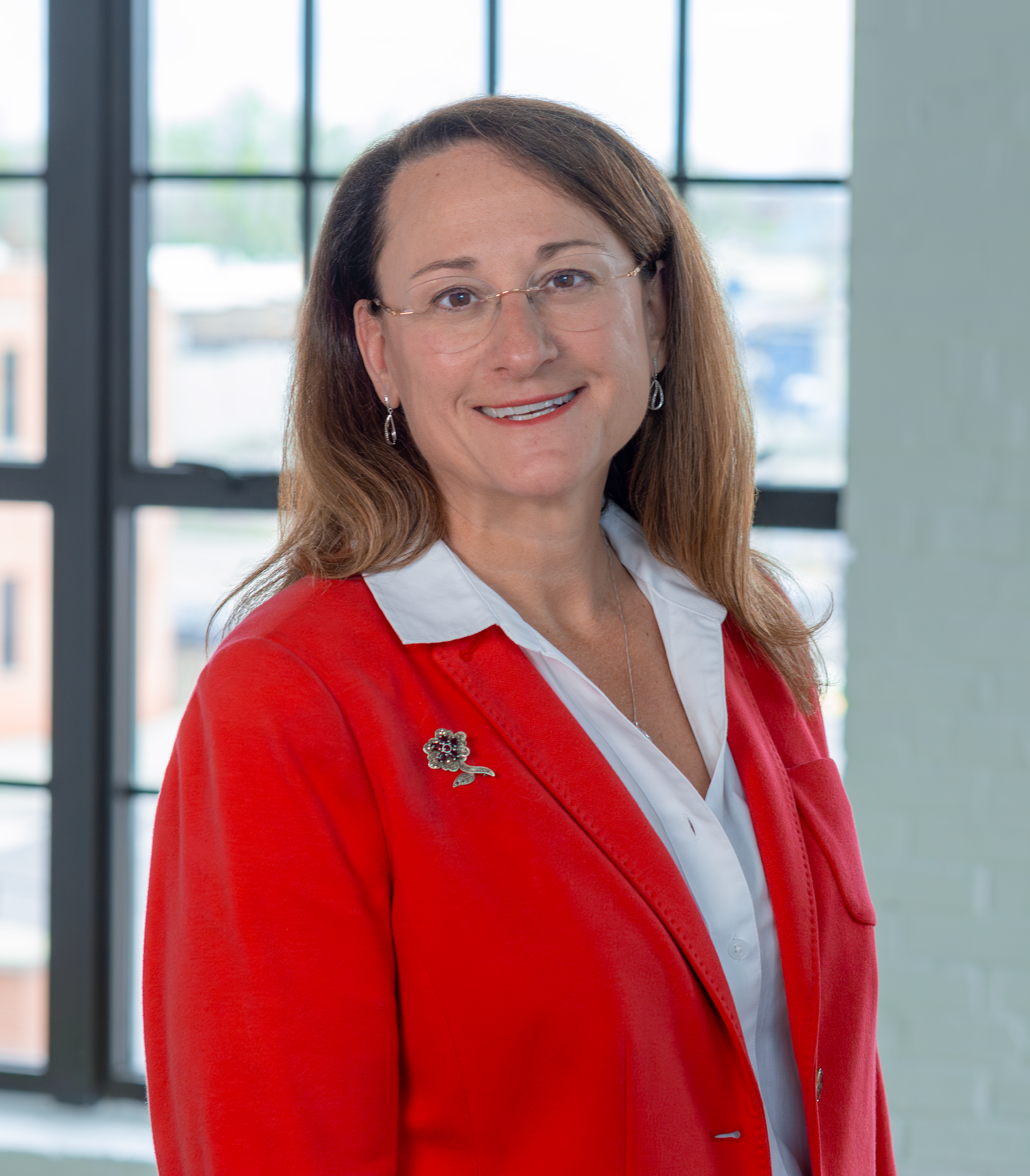

Executive Director of the Office of State and Local Government Coordination and Preparedness at the Department of Homeland Security
- In office January 4, 2006 – October 31, 2006
- President: George W. Bush

Acting Assistant Attorney General of the Office of Justice Programs
- In office January 21, 2005 – January 4, 2006
- President: George W. Bush

Deputy Associate Attorney General of the Department of Justice
- In office October 2003 – January 4, 2006
- President: George W. Bush

Principal Deputy Assistant Attorney General of the Office of Justice Programs
- In office June 25, 2001 – October 2003
- President: George W. Bush

Personal details
- Born: January 5, 1969 (age 57)
- Education: University of Missouri (BA)

Tracy A. Henke (born January 5, 1969) is a former government official who held high-level positions in the United States Department of Justice and the Department of Homeland Security during the George W. Bush administration. Henke resigned as Executive Director of the Office of State and Local Government Coordination and Preparedness at the Department of Homeland Security in October 2006, and began working in the private sector. Henke became the Chief Operating Officer and Deputy Executive Director of the Advanced Manufacturing Innovation Center St. Louis (AMICSTL) in St. Louis, Missouri in 2023.

== Life and education ==
Henke is from Moscow Mills, Missouri. She earned a bachelor's degree in political science from the University of Missouri in 1991.

== Early career ==
Henke held several entry level and mid-level jobs with Missouri Senator John Danforth, both in St. Louis and in Washington. She then became a legislative assistant for Missouri Senator Christopher Bond, and later worked as his senior policy adviser.

== Government career ==
=== Department of Justice ===
Henke joined the Justice Department on June 25, 2001, by invitation from former Missouri governor and senator John Ashcroft, who had just become the United States Attorney General. Henke became the Principal Deputy Assistant Attorney General (PDAAG) of the Office of Justice Programs. She eventually rose to become the Deputy Associate Attorney General at the Department of Justice, and continued in that position when she was appointed Acting Assistant Attorney General for the OJP in January 2005.

==== Contributions to the USA PATRIOT Act ====
The USA PATRIOT Act removed a great deal of freedom from the directors of the Bureau of Justice Statistics and the National Institute of Justice, giving their authority to the assistant attorney general for the Office of Justice Programs. At the time, Henke was deputy to Deborah Daniels, who held the assistant attorney general position. A report from the New York Times alleged that Henke was the one who had added language to the Act that undercut the agencies' independence. This reportedly resulted in statistical reports and grant decisions going through Henke and Daniels before being publicly released, and some employees said this had introduced several-months-long delays.

==== Bureau of Justice Statistics racial profiling report ====
In April 2005, Bureau of Justice Statistics leader Lawrence A. Greenfield prepared a major report on police traffic stops. Henke, as acting assistant attorney general who oversaw the statistics branch, reviewed the report. The report showed, and the announcement summarized, that the rate at which whites, blacks and Hispanics were stopped was about the same, but that once stopped, black and Hispanic drivers were two to three times more likely to suffer a negative consequence, such as being searched, handcuffed, or arrested. For the press release, Henke insisted that the first finding be included (that there was no apparent difference in the rate at which different ethnic groups were stopped), but that the second finding be removed (that there was a significant different in how different ethnic groups were treated once stopped) because she didn't believe it accurately reflected the findings of the study.

Greenfeld refused to make the changes recommended by Henke, and then complained that Henke was trying to exert political pressure on him to make the changes. Shortly after, Greenfield was informed that he was going to be replaced as director, and was pressured to resign. He was ultimately reassigned.

Henke later said in an August 2005 interview with the New York Times that she didn't recall the incident. In a 2006 interview with the St. Louis Post-Dispatch, Henke claimed that she had edited it to reflect the report, which noted that the study had not investigated the behavior of the motorists, and so could not attribute the disparity to race.

=== Department of Homeland Security ===
On September 5, 2005, President George W. Bush nominated Henke to be the Executive Director of the Office of State and Local Government Coordination and Preparedness at the Department of Homeland Security, and then recess appointed her to the position on January 4, 2006. Her appointment was controversial, with some raising concerns over the racial profiling report, and others, such as P.J. Crowley, opining that she lacked experience for the job. Senators Susan Collins (R-ME) and Joe Lieberman (D-CT) also expressed concerns over Bush's choice to appoint Henke before the Senate Homeland Security and Governmental Affairs Committee voted on the appointment. Lieberman had expressed concerns during the Committee hearing that her actions involving the racial profiling study "may have undermined the office's reputation for objectivity and independence."

On May 31, 2006, Henke, who was in charge of Homeland Security's grant-making, announced funding allocations. Some argued the plans to reduce by 40% each the counterterrorism funds for New York City was misguided. Henke and Department of Justice officials stated that the total program allocation provided by Congress was $500 million less than the year prior, explaining the difference in allocation. Henke faced criticism from members of Congress who said the funding decisions inexplicable. Henke resigned from the position in the wake of this criticism, effective October 31, 2006. Representative Peter T. King (R-NY) said of the incident: "Tracy Henke had to leave the department. Very simply, she did a terrible job in the decisions she made to award grant money. ... And the department realized that."

== Private sector career ==
After leaving the Department of Homeland Security, Henke joined the lobbying firm The Ashcroft Group, which was run by her former boss, Attorney General John Ashcroft.

In October 2013, Henke was announced as the new Legislative Director for Senator Roy Blunt of Missouri, after initially joining his team in June of that same year as a Senior Policy Advisor.

Effective November 18, 2019, Henke joined the John F. Kennedy Center for the Performing Arts' senior leadership team as the Vice President of Government Relations & Protocol. During the COVID-19 pandemic, Henke was a staunch advocate for the center, requesting assistance from top House and Senate Appropriations Committee staff in order to protect the "Congressionally mandated mission" of the center until it was deemed safe to re-open to the public.

Henke served as the Chief Policy Officer for Greater St. Louis, Inc. (GSL) and President of its ChamberSTL Initiative from September 2021 to August 2023, shortly after the organization's founding. GSL is an organization working to foster inclusive economic growth.

On August 4, 2023, Henke began working with the Advanced Manufacturing Innovation Center St. Louis (AMICSTL) as the organization's Chief Operating Officer and Deputy Executive Director.
