= Treacy =

Treacy is a surname of Irish origin. It means "fighter". Notable people with the name include:

- Billy Treacy (contemporary), Irish rugby league player
- Bláthnaid Treacy (born 1987/1988), Irish broadcaster and podcaster
- Carolyn Treacy (born 1982), American Winter Olympics athlete
- Colman Treacy (born 1949), Judge, lawyer
- Darren Treacy (rugby league) (born 1971), Australian former rugby league footballer
- Darren Treacy (footballer) (born 1970), English former footballer
- Eric Treacy (1907–1978), Anglican Bishop and railway photographer.
- Emerson Treacy (1900–1967), American stage and film actor
- Farrell Treacy (born 1995), British short-track speed skater
- Jim Treacy (born 1943), Irish hurler
- John Patrick Treacy (1891–1964), American Roman Catholic Bishop of La Crosse, Wisconsin
- John Treacy (born 1957), Irish Olympic track and field athlete
- Keith Treacy (born 1988), Irish professional football player
- Niall Treacy (born 2000), British short-track speed skater
- Noel Treacy (born 1951), Irish politician; TD for Galway East
- Patrick Ambrose Treacy (1834–1912), Irish Roman Catholic missionary to Australia and New Zealand
- Philip Treacy (born 1967), Irish milliner; designed hats for the wedding of Prince Charles and Camilla Bowles
- Ray Treacy (footballer) (1946–2015), Irish professional football player
- Sara Louise Treacy (born 1989), Irish Athlete
- Seán Treacy (1895–1920), leader of the IRA during the Irish War of Independence
- Seán Treacy (politician) (1923–2018), Irish politician; speaker of Dáil Éireann 1973–77 and 1987–97
