= Lisa Kove =

Lisa S. Kove
- Born: December 27, 1958 (age 67); Boston, Massachusetts, United States
- Education: Park University
- Occupation: United States Civil Servant: Executive Director of Department of Defense Federal Globe
- Movement: Civil Rights Movement

Lisa Sue Kove (born 1958) is an American civil servant and disabled retired combat veteran, a San Diego, California, corporate executive, and a United States civil rights activist. She is the executive director of the Department of Defense Federal Glove.

== Early life, military and education ==
Kove grew up in Boston, Massachusetts, the daughter of prominent attorney Myron Kove. She dropped out of college at the age of 17 to join the United States Navy. Kove served in HM 12 and RH-53D squadron that supported HM-16 in the Iran Hostage Crisis. During the rescue mission known as Operation Eagle Claw Kove broke her back but ignored the pain and continued to serve until she was honorably discharged in 1982 as a service-related disabled veteran. Kove later returned to college, where she earned a degree in logistics and management from Park University.

== Corporate career ==
Following her stint in the United States Navy Kove worked for Kaman Aerospace, followed by Aeronautical Radio, Incorporated (ARINC), and later as a Department of Defense civil servant in the Washington, D.C. beltway. Following the implementation of 'Don't Ask, Don't Tell', the official United States policy on service by gays and lesbians in the military instituted by the Clinton Administration on February 28, 1994, when Department of Defense Directive 1304.26 issued on December 21, 1993, took effect, Kove, who had been an out lesbian for years, soon became the subject of sexual orientation harassment. This harassment increased as her 13-year relationship to her partner came to an end. In 1997 her partner drafted legal paperwork crafted to go to an office outside of Kove's chain of command with the intent to expose, embarrass and have her fired from the Department of Defense job under 'Don't Ask, Don't Tell'. Concerned for her personal safety, Kove moved with her five children into a domestic abuse shelter, then later took orders to San Diego, California to distance herself from her former partner.

Upon her arrival to San Diego, her commanding officer refused to let her on base due to her sexuality. Kove was eventually allowed to work, but she faced years of harassment until a co-worker stood up for her, resulting in the resignation of her commanding officer. Since 2008 Kove has served as the executive director of the Department of Defense Federal Globe.

== Child support case ==
In 1998 Kove filed one of the first child support suits in the nation for children born to same-sex couples. The Superior Court of Pennsylvania affirmed that Kove's former lesbian partner must pay support for the five children Kove bore during their relationship.

== Community involvement ==
Kove was instrumental in the 2010 Coalition to Repeal Proposition 8, the California ballot proposition and a state constitutional amendment that passed in the November 2008 California state elections banning same-sex marriage.

Kove also currently serves on several large non-profit nationally based governing boards, including on the board of the Equality News Network. She was Strategic Planning Director for the San Diego Equality Campaign during the contentious Proposition 8 battle in 2008, and Kove was a founding member of the San Diego Alliance for Marriage Equality. Kove also served on Lori Saldana's, former member of the California State Assembly from the 76th Assembly district, Hate Free San Diego Commission as she consulted with representatives of San Diego businesses to foster programs to end hate crimes. From 2010 to 2013 Kove was also a voting member of the San Diego LGBT Center's Community Leadership Council.

Kove has received numerous honors due to her community outreach, including a People's Mic Award from KNSJ, being named Outstanding Woman of the Year in 2011 by the Nicky Awards, and she was inducted in 2012 into The San Diego LGBT Community Center Benjamin F. Dillingham and Bridge Wilson LGBT Veterans Wall of Honor. Kove has also been featured in OutServe Magazine.
