= Frank A. Tracy Generating Station =

Coordinates: 39°33′44″N 119°31′24″W

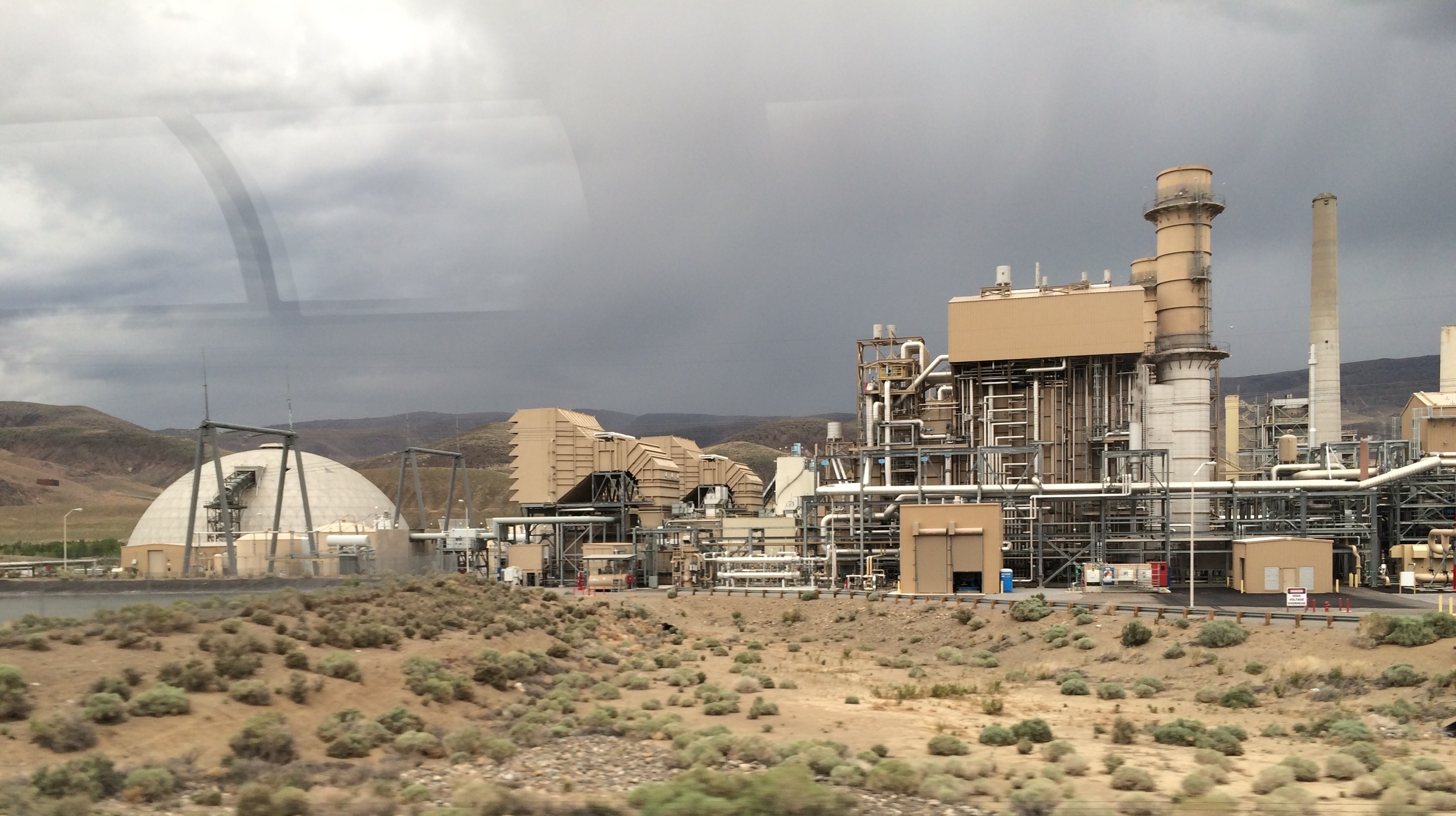
Tracy Generating Station, as seen from the Amtrak California Zephyr train

The Frank A. Tracy Generating Station is a 12 unit 1,021-megawatt (1,369,000 hp) gas-fired power station located in Storey County, Nevada and owned by NV Energy, serving Reno and the Tahoe Reno Industrial Center. Some peaking capacity is provided by diesel powered units. The station employs reduced water consumption, and emits about 1½ million tons CO_{2} per year. It lies just east of the Patrick area, about 17 miles east of Reno, just off Interstate 80, between Exit 28 and Exit 32. It is situated on the south bank of the Truckee River, which forms the county line between Storey County and Washoe County on the other side of the river.

Frank A. Tracy Generating Station 17 miles east of Reno

== Units ==
Peaking Unit 1 - 10-megawatt (13,000 hp) peaking, diesel 1961
Peaking Unit - 2 10-megawatt (13,000 hp) peaking, diesel 1963
Peaking Unit - 3 72-megawatt (97,000 hp) diesel or natural gas 1994
Peaking Unit - 4 72-megawatt (97,000 hp) peaking, diesel or natural gas 1994
Unit 1 53-megawatt (71,000 hp) 1963 (units 3, 4 and 5 produce a total of 244-megawatt (327,000 hp))
Unit - 2 83-megawatt (111,000 hp) 1965
Unit - 3 108-megawatt (145,000 hp) 1974
Unit - 4 108-megawatt (145,000 hp) 1996 6FA combustion turbines
Unit - 5 108-megawatt (145,000 hp) 1996 6FA combustion turbines
Unit - 8 289-megawatt (388,000 hp) 2008 7FA combustion turbines (units 8, 9 and 10 produce a combined 541 megawatts (725,000 hp)
Unit 9 - 2008 7FA combustion turbines
Unit 10 - 2008
