= Traci Stumpf =

American television host, comedian and actress

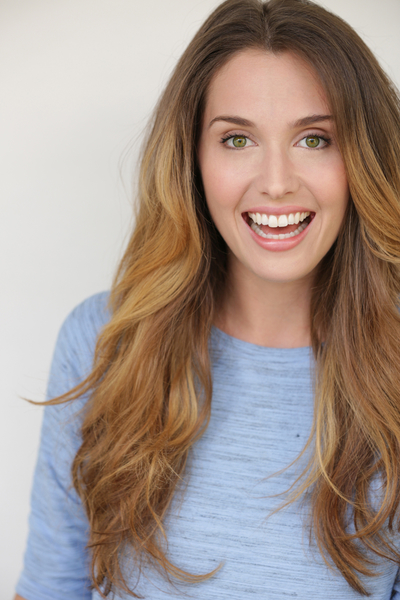
- Traci Stumpf in 2014
- Born: Traci Stumpf; September 10, 1986 (age 40); Burbank, California

Comedy career
- Years active: 2009–present
- Medium: comedy, television, web series
- Genre: comedy
- Subject: female satire
- Website: http://www.tracistumpf.com

Traci Stumpf is an American TV host, Stand up comedian and actress.

She won an Emmy hosting Eat, Play, Stay: Cincinnati in 2024.

She hosted the 2016 MTV MIAW Music awards in Mexico City with Fall Out Boy’s bassist Pete Wentz. She was the host of an MTV show called GameChanger currently filming in New York, as well working on new shows currently in development with production company DiGa. She was named one of the "Four Comedians You Need to Check Out this Year" by The Sharpe.

== Career ==
Some of her recent shows are Crime Obsession for Investigation Discovery in 2021, 1990’s Totally Scandalous for Investigation Discovery in 2018, Comic-Con for TBS (2025-2019), Dirty Laundry (2015-2019) and Basic Bitch Wars in 2018.

Stumpf hosted Sorry Not Sorry in 2017. In early 2016 she was the co-host of the MTV International show Bugging Out, a prank show using hidden cameras. That same year she worked hosting Game Changer for MTV International . From 2014 to 2016 Stumpf hosted the round table hot topic show Debatable on the YouTube channel Clevver News by Defy Media. In 2014 Stumpf was the nightly host of Yahoo TV's most viewed show TV IN NO TIME, of ET Now, Clevver TV's Totally Clevver, a weekly comedic "man on the street" pop culture show. In 2013 she hosted Undercover Boss for CBS.
