= The UTeach Institute =

Nonprofit organization

The UTeach Institute is a nonprofit organization created in 2006 in response to growing concerns about science, technology, engineering, and mathematics (STEM) education in the United States and interest in the secondary STEM teacher certification program, UTeach, started in 1997 at The University of Texas at Austin.

The UTeach Institute issued its first request for proposals to replicate UTeach in 2007. An initial cohort of 13 universities was selected to receive individual grants of up to $1.4 million each to replicate the program over a four-year implementation period from 2008 to 2012. A second cohort of 8 universities was selected for a 2010-2014 grant cycle, and a third cohort of universities is expected to begin implementation in Spring 2012. As of February 2011, excluding the original UTeach program at The University of Texas at Austin, 4,190 students currently were enrolled in UTeach programs at 21 universities across the country.

The UTeach Institute acts as the liaison between the original UTeach program at The University of Texas at Austin and individuals implementing the program on other university campuses. The Institute provides detailed technical assistance and support and hosts an annual conference in Austin, Texas focusing on issues of STEM teacher preparation, national and state STEM education policy, the UTeach program model, and UTeach replication. In addition to assisting the universities implementing UTeach, the UTeach Institute conducts ongoing evaluations of progress and fulfills reporting requirements to various funders.

UTeach has been a model for mathematics and science education programs at other institutions, and has been expanded to involve an additional forty-four universities in twenty-one states by 2019.

2008-2012 (cohort 1)
Florida State University
Louisiana State University
Northern Arizona University
Temple University
University of California, Berkeley
University of California, Irvine
University of Colorado Boulder
University of Florida
University of Houston
University of Kansas
University of North Texas
University of Texas, Dallas
Western Kentucky University
2010-2014 (cohort 2)
Cleveland State University
Middle Tennessee State University
University of Colorado Colorado Springs
University of Memphis
University of Tennessee, Chattanooga
University of Tennessee, Knoxville
University of Texas, Arlington
University of Texas at Tyler
2011-2015 (cohort 3)
Columbus State University
Southern Polytechnic State University
University of Massachusetts, Lowell
University of West Georgia
2012-2016 (cohort 4)
Boise State University
Florida Institute of Technology
Towson University
University of Arkansas at Fayetteville
University of Arkansas at Little Rock
University of Central Arkansas
University of Texas at Brownsville
University of Texas, Pan American
2013-2018 (cohort 5)
Drexel University
Florida International University
University of Maryland, College Park
Oklahoma State University
Old Dominion University
University of Alabama, Birmingham
2015-2019 (cohort 6)
George Washington University
Louisiana Tech University
University of Massachusetts, Boston
University of Nevada, Reno
West Virginia University

2016–2020 (cohort 7)

University of Texas at San Antonio
Morehead State University

2017–2021 (cohort 8)

Central Washington University

The UTeach Institute partners with corporations, foundations, states, and private donors to fund UTeach replication.
