= Justice Tracy =

Justice Tracy may refer to:

- Benjamin F. Tracy (1830–1915), chief judge of the New York Court of Appeals
- Philemon Tracy (1831–1862), associate justice of the Supreme Court of Georgia
