= Tracey Weldon =

American linguist

- Education: Furman University; The Ohio State University
- Employer: University of South Carolina
- Known for: African American English studies

Tracey Weldon is an American linguist who studies variationist sociolinguistics, Gullah, Quantitative Sociolinguistics, and African American English.

== Education ==
Weldon received her BA in English and French from Furman University in 1991 and her PhD in Linguistics from Ohio State University in 1998 with her dissertation Exploring the AAVE-Gullah connection: A comparative study of copula variability.

== Career ==
Weldon's work has contributed to work on varieties of African American English and Gullah. She was one of the producers of the documentary Talking Black in America. Her most notable publication is her book on Middle Class African American English, which is the first comprehensive analysis of middle class AAE speakers rather than working class speakers who have traditionally received more scholarly attention. Some topics she explores from her first person perspective in the book include code switching, public performance, linguistic attitudes, and camouflaged features.

She was the chair for the Linguistic Society of America's Committee for Ethnic Diversity (CEDL) in 2004, 2005 and 2019.

She has had various administrative positions; she was the Associate Dean of Diversity for the College of Arts and Sciences and in 2021, she was appointed the interim dean of the Graduate School at the University of South Carolina.

She has taught several courses such as African American English, Introduction to Language, Introduction to Language, Introduction to Language Sciences, Language and Gender, Language in the USA and The English Language. She has been interviewed for such programs as Sounds of the South and CODESWITCHING: Black Girl from the Burbs.

Weldon serves as the Executive Editor for the Oxford Dictionary of African American English.

== Personal life ==
In the documentary Talking Black in America, Tracey discussed her husband who is from Jamaica. Through her studies and career the both of them have been able to recognize similarities and differences in the way he speaks compared to people from other parts of the Caribbean.

== Selected publications ==
Books

- 2021. Middle Class African American English. Cambridge: Cambridge University Press. 1994. Jannedy, Stefanie, Robert Poletto, Tracey Weldon, eds. The Language Files. 6th edition. Columbus: Ohio State University Press.

Academic Journal Articles

- 2015. Britt, Erica and Tracey Weldon. African American English and the Middle Class. Oxford Handbook of African American Language. New York, Oxford: Oxford University Press. 800-816.
- 2015. Weldon, Tracey and Simanique Moody. The place of Gullah in the African American linguistic continuum. Oxford Handbook of African American Language. New York, Oxford: Oxford University Press. 163-180.
- 2013. Vignette on “Working with scripted data.” In Data collection in sociolinguistics: Methods and applications. Christine Mallinson, Becky Childs, and Gerarad Van Herk, eds. New York: Routledge. 228-231.
- 2012. “Teaching African American English to College Students: Ideological and Pedagogical Challenges and Solutions.” American Speech: Teaching American Speech 87: 2. 232-247.
- 2011. Labov, William, Sharon Ash, Maya Ravindranath, Tracey Weldon, Maciej Baranowski, Naomi Nagy. Properties of the sociolinguistic monitor. Journal of Sociolinguistics 15: 4. 431-463.
- 2007. Gullah negation: A variable analysis. American Speech. 82: 4. 341-366.
- 2005. Review article on The development of African American English, by Walt Wolfram and Erik Thomas, Oxford and Malden: Blackwell, 2002; and The historical evolution of earlier African American English: An empirical comparison of early sources, by Alexander Kautzsch, Berlin and New York: Mouton de Gruyter
