= Tracy Emblem =

American lawyer

Personal details
- Born: April 16, 1955 (age 71)
- Party: Democratic
- Spouse: Thor Emblem
- Children: 7
- Education: National University
- Profession: Attorney

Tracy Emblem (born April 16, 1955) is an American attorney and was a Democratic candidate for Congress in California's 50th district, in North San Diego County. Emblem ran in the 2010 Democratic Primary but lost to Francine Busby.

== Personal ==
Through determination to improve the lives of her children, Emblem worked her way out of poverty in the 1970s. As a single mother she utilized Pell Grants to put herself through school, and worked her way through law school at National University in San Diego, California. Emblem has worked in private law practice in Escondido, California since 1989.

== Legal work ==
Emblem began her legal career as a law clerk for the California Attorney General's Office, Writs and Appeals Division. She has since practiced law with an emphasis in appellate law and civil rights. Over the past two decades she has researched and written over 300 writs and appeals, and argued before the Supreme Court of California. Emblem has also served as pro-tem judge with the San Diego courts.

Emblem has also volunteered her time to free wrongfully convicted prisoners through the California Innocence Project. In 2004 she won the release of Kenneth Marsh, who was wrongfully convicted of murdering his girlfriend's two-year-old son when he fell off the couch and hit his head on the fireplace hearth. Marsh spent 21 years behind bars, even though his girlfriend testified that he was innocent. Marsh and his longtime girlfriend have since married.

Emblem's work with the California Innocence Project brought her national acclaim. Her work has been profiled on CNN's Larry King Live, and led her to receive numerous awards. Emblem's recent work involves fighting for Native Americans' rights and for families that have been disenrolled from Indian tribes.

== Community activism ==
Emblem served on the board of directors for the League of Women Voters of Escondido for five years as the public relations director, where she focused on educational programs to teach children about the election process. She also served on the statewide League of Women Voters committee to update the initiative process study, and moderated ballot initiative election pros and cons forums.

Emblem also served as president of the board of directors for the Escondido Community Development Center, a non-profit organization that provides early education and child care for low-income families.
