= Bateman (surname) =

- Language: English

Origin
- Meaning: son of "Bartholomew"; Boat Man in Old English.
- Region of origin: England

Bateman is an English surname. For more, see Batman (surname). Notable people with the name include:

- Ahmad Bateman (born 1961), Canadian-American professional golfer
- Alan Bateman (1936–2012), Australian screenwriter, producer and director
- Alan Mara Bateman (1889–1971), Canadian-American economic geologist
- Alex Bateman (born 1972), British bioinformatician
- Alfred Bateman (1844–1929), British statistician
- Allan Bateman (born 1965), Welsh rugby union and rugby league footballer
- Amanda Bateman (born 1996), Australian representative rower
- Andrew Bateman, South African politician
- Angus John Bateman (1919–1996), English geneticist
- Ann Bateman (1748–1813), British artist
- Anthony Bateman (died 1687), English merchant
- Arthur Bateman, multiple people
- Ben Bateman (1892–1961), English professional footballer
- Brett Bateman (born 2002), American baseball player
- Bill Bateman (born 1951), American drummer
- Bill Bateman (1866–1935), Australian businessman and cricketer
- Bob Bateman (born 1954), American football player
- Brian Bateman (born 1973), American professional golfer
- C. Donald Bateman (1932–2023), Canadian electrical engineer, inventor of the Ground Proximity Warning System
- Charles Bateman (architect) (1863–1947), English architect
- Charles Bateman (actor) (1930–2024), Scottish-born actor on American television
- Chance Bateman (born 1981), Australian rules football coach and player
- Christian Henry Bateman (1813–1889), English minister and hymn writer
- Christopher Bateman (born 1957), American politician
- Colin Bateman (born 1962), British novelist, screenwriter and journalist; known mononymously as Bateman
- Edgar Bateman, multiple people
- Edmund Bateman (1704–1751), English cleric and academic
- Edward Bateman (1834–1909), English cricketer
- Edward La Trobe Bateman (1816–1897), English Victorian painter
- Ephraim Bateman (1780–1829), American politician
- Florence Golson Bateman (1891–1987), American soprano, composer and educator
- Frank Bateman (1924–1991), Australian rules footballer
- Fred Bateman (1937–2012), American economic historian
- Gabriel Bateman (born 2004), American actor
- George Bateman (1865–1953), English footballer
- H. M. Bateman (1887–1970), British humorous artist and cartoonist
- Harry Bateman (1882–1946), English mathematician
- Harry Bateman (artist) (1896–1976), English landscape painter
- Herb Bateman (1928–2000), American politician
- Hester Bateman (bap.1708–1794), English silversmith
- Hezekiah Linthicum Bateman (1812–1875), American actor and manager
- Jaime Bateman Cayón (1940–1983), Colombian guerrilla leader
- James Bateman, multiple people
- Jason Bateman (born 1969), American actor
- Jay Bateman (born 1973), American football player and coach
- Jessica Bateman (born 1981), American politician
- Jessie Bateman (1877–1940), English actress
- Jim Bateman (1925–1987), New Zealand politician and educationalist
- John Bateman, 2nd Viscount Bateman (1721–1802), British politician
- John Bateman (Australian settler) (1789–1855), Australian colonist, postmaster, general store owner and investor
- John Frederick Bateman (1810–1889), British civil engineer
- John Bateman (rugby league) (born 1993), English rugby league player
- Joyce Bateman (born 1957), Canadian politician
- Justine Bateman (born 1966), American actress
- Katrina Bateman (born 1992), Australian rower
- Kip Bateman (born 1957), American politician
- Marcus Bateman (born 1982), British rower
- Meg Bateman (born 1959), Scottish academic, poet and writer
- Linden Bateman (born 1940), American politician
- Mary Bateman (1768–1809), English criminal and alleged witch known as the Yorkshire Witch
- Merrill J. Bateman (born 1936), American leader of The Church of Jesus Christ of Latter-day Saints and former Brigham Young University President
- Nick Bateman, multiple people
- Oliver Bateman (1923–2012), American politician
- Paul T. Bateman (1919–2012), American mathematician
- Phil Bateman (born 1962), British cyclist
- Rashod Bateman (born 1999), American football player
- Ray Bateman Jr. (1955–1990), American luger
- Raymond Bateman (1927–2016), American politician
- Richard Bateman (cricketer) (1849–1913), English cricketer
- Richard Bateman (botanist) (born 1958), British botanist
- Robert Bateman (disambiguation), multiple people
- Rowland Bateman (circa 1737–1803), Irish politician
- Sam Bateman, American politician
- Sarah Blake Bateman (born 1990), American-Icelandic swimmer
- Scott Bateman (born 1964), American filmmaker, author, animator, and cartoonist
- Sidney Frances Bateman (1823–1881), American actress, playwright, and theatrical manager
- Stephan Bateman (born 1958), New Zealand cricketer
- Talitha Bateman (born 2001 or 2002), American actress
- Tim Bateman (born 1987), New Zealand Māori rugby player
- Thomas Bateman (disambiguation), multiple people
- Victor Bateman (1904–1972), Australian rules footballer
- Victoria Bateman (born 1979), British feminist and academic economist
- Victory Bateman (1865–1926), American film actress
- Walter Bateman (1826–1882), Australian politician
- William Bateman (disambiguation), multiple people

== Fictional characters ==
- Christian Bateman, a villain from the fifth season of the video game series Criminal Case
- Danny Bateman, character in American football film The Replacements
- Patrick Bateman, a recurring character in the works of Bret Easton Ellis, protagonist of the book American Psycho
- Sean Bateman, brother of Patrick Bateman, one of the three main characters in The Rules of Attraction
- Bateman, a superhero similar to Batman, played by Jason Bateman, in a television advertisement for State Farm

== See also ==
- Bateman (disambiguation)
- Viscount Bateman, extinct title in the peerage of Ireland
