= Tracy (surname) =

Tracy is a surname, and may refer to:

== A ==
- Adrian Tracy (born 1988), American football player
- Albert H. Tracy (1793–1859), American politician
- Alex Tracy (born 2001), American ice hockey goaltender
- Amasa Tracy (1829–1908), Union Army officer
- Andrew Tracy (1797–1868), American politician, teacher and lawyer from Vermont
- Andy Tracy (born 1973), American baseball player
- Arthur Tracy (1899–1997), American actor

== B ==
- Ben Tracy (born 1976), American journalist
- Benjamin F. Tracy (1830–1915), American judge and politician
- Bert Tracy, English film actor
- Bob Tracy (1928–2008), American sports coach
- Brian Tracy (born 1944), Canadian-American motivational speaker and author

== C ==
- C. Richard Tracy (born 1943), American biologist and academic
- Chad Tracy (baseball manager) (born 1985), American baseball manager
- Chad Tracy (third baseman) (born 1980), American baseball player
- Charles Tracy (art historian) (1938–2024), British scholar and heritage consultant
- Charles H. Tracy (1833–1911), Union Army Medal of Honor recipient
- Clarissa Tracy (1818–1905), American botanist
- Clint Tracy (born 1974), American politician from Missouri
- Cole Tracy (born 1996), American football placekicker
- Craig Tracy (mathematician) (1945–2026), American mathematician
- Craig Tracy (artist) (born 1967), American body painting artist

== D ==
- Daniel Tracy (politician) (1843–1919), American farmer and politician from Wisconsin
- Daniel W. Tracy (1886–1955), American labor union leader
- David Tracy (1939–2025), American Catholic theologian and priest, and academic
- Dean Tracy (born 1985), American track cyclist
- Don Tracy (born 1949/50), American lawyer and politician
- Donna Tracy, American visual effects artist

== E ==
- Ed Tracy, British television writer and director
- Edward D. Tracy (1833–1863), American Confederate Army officer
- Edward G. Tracy (1841–1898), American pharmacist and politician from New York
- Erasmus Darwin Tracy (1810–1877), American politician from Florida
- Ethan Tracy (born 1989), American golfer

== F ==
- Frazer Blake-Tracy (born 1995), English footballer

== G ==
- Gene Tracy (1927–1979), American comedian and recording artist

== H ==
- Harriet Tracy (1834–1918), American inventor
- Harry Tracy (1875–1902), American Old West outlaw
- Helen Tracy (1850–1924), American actress
- Henry Leigh Tracy, 8th Viscount Tracy (1732–1797), English peer
- Henry Wells Tracy (1807–1886), American politician from Pennsylvania
- Hilda Tracy (1927–2010), British physiologist
- Honor Tracy (1913–1989), British novelist and travel writer

== J ==
- Jack Tracy (1926–2010), American jazz producer and journalist
- James Tracy (activist) (born 1970), American author and activist
- James Tracy (historian) (born 1938), American historian
- James Tracy (rugby union) (born 1991), Irish rugby union footballer
- JJ Tracy (born 2002), American tennis player
- Javon Tracy (born 2003), American football player
- Jeanie Tracy, American musician
- Jil Tracy (born 1973), American politician from Illinois
- Jill Tracy, American musician
- Jim Tracy (baseball) (born 1955), American baseball player and manager
- Jim Tracy (politician) (1956–2026), American politician from Tennessee
- Jim Tracy (ski), American skiing coach
- Joe Tracy (1873–1959), American racing driver
- John Tracy (aerospace executive) (born 1954), American chief technology officer
- John Tracy (director), American television director
- John Tracy (Medal of Honor) (1848–1918), United States Army Medal of Honor recipient
- John Tracy (MP for Bridport) (fl.1384–1394), English Member of Parliament
- John Tracy (New York politician) (1783–1864), American judge and politician
- John Tracy (Wisconsin politician) (1852–1931), American politician from Wisconsin
- John Emmet Tracy, American-Canadian actor
- John Tracy, 1st Viscount Tracy (died c.1648), English landowner, politician and peer
- John Tracy, 7th Viscount Tracy (1722–1793), British peer and academic
- Joseph Tracy (1793–1874), American Congregational minister
- Joseph T. Tracy (1865–1952), American politician from Ohio

== K ==
- Keegan Connor Tracy (born 1971), Canadian actress and author

== L ==
- Lee Tracy (1898–1968), American actor
- Lee Tracy (artist), American artist based in Chicago
- Lil Tracy (born 1995), American rapper and singer
- Louis Tracy (1863–1928), British journalist and writer
- Louise Tracy (1896–1983), American deaf education activist, wife of Spencer Tracy
- Lynne M. Tracy, American diplomat

== M ==
- Marc Tracy, American journalist
- Marcus Tracy (born 1986), American soccer player
- Martha Tracy (1876–1942), American physician and educator
- Mary Ellen Tracy (born 1943), American religious leader
- Mary Lee Tracy, American gymnastics coach
- Matt Tracy (born 1988), American baseball pitcher and coach
- Michael Tracy known as Tracy 168 (1958-2023), American graffiti artist
- Mike Tracy, American college soccer player and coach
- Mona Tracy (1892–1959), New Zealand writer, journalist and community worker
- Morris DeHaven Tracy (1890–1940), American journalist

== N ==
- Nathaniel Tracy (1751–1796), American merchant and politician

== P ==
- Paul Tracy (born 1968), Canadian racing driver
- Paul E. Tracy (died 2020), American criminologist and academic
- Philemon Tracy (1831–1862), American judge
- Phineas L. Tracy (1786–1876), American politician from New York State, brother of Albert H. Tracy

== R ==
- Richard Tracy (died 1569), English lay Protestant reformer and Member of the Parliament
- Richard E. Tracy, American forensic pathologist and academic
- Robert Tracy (dancer) (1955–2007), American dancer and writer
- Robert Tracy (judge) (1655–1735), English judge
- Robert Tracy (MP) (died 1767), English politician
- Robert J. Tracy, American police commissioner
- Robert Emmet Tracy (1909–1980), American Catholic prelate
- Robert Tracy, 2nd Viscount Tracy (c.1593–1662), English politician and peer
- Roger Tracy (1938–2007), American politician from Ohio
- Rosemarie Tracy, German linguist
- Russell Tracy (1949–2026), American epidemiologist and pathologist

== S ==
- Sally Tracy, Australian midwife and activist
- Samuel Mills Tracy (1847–1920), American botanist
- Sarah J. Tracy, American communication scholar
- Sean Tracy (born 1963), New Zealand cricketer
- Sheila Tracy (1934–2014), British trombonist and broadcaster
- Spencer Tracy (1900–1967), American actor
- Stephen V. Tracy (born 1941), American classicist
- Steve Tracy (1952–1986), American film and television actor
- Susan Tracy (born 1960), American politician from Massachusetts
- Susan E. Tracy (1864–1928), American nurse and occupational therapist

== T ==
- Taylor Tracy, American uthor of middle-grade novels
- Thomas F. Tracy (1861–1916), American labor unionist
- Thomas M. Tracy (born 1936), American administrator
- Thomas Henry Tracy (1848–1925), Canadian architect
- Tom Tracy (1934–1996), American football player
- Tyrone Tracy Jr. (born 1999), American football player
- Tripp Tracy (born 1973), American ice hockey player and commentator

== U ==
- Uri Tracy (1764–1838), American politician from New York
- Uriah Tracy (1755–1807), American lawyer and politician from Connecticut

== V ==
- Virginia Tracy (1874–1946), American novelist

== W ==
- Walter Tracy (1914–1995), English typographer and writer
- Walter Tracy (MP) (fl.1413–1427), English Member of Parliament
- Will Tracy, American film producer and writer
- William Tracy (1917–1967), American actor
- William Tracy (14th-century MP) (fl.1313–1322), English Member of Parliament
- William Tracy (JP) (died 1530), English justice and Lutheran convert
- William Tracy (MP, died 1440) (died 1440), English Member of Parliament
- William G. Tracy (1842–1924), Union Army Medal of Honor recipient
- Wyngard Tracy (1952–2010), Filipino talent manager

== Y ==
- Yvonne Tracy (born 1981), Irish association footballer

== Z ==
- Zion Tracy (born 2004), American football player

== See also ==
- P. J. Tracy, American pseudonymous novelist duo
- Katharine Hepburn and Spencer Tracy, acting duo
- de Tracy
- Hanbury-Tracy
- Tracey (surname)
- Treacy
- Tacy (disambiguation)
