= Hanbury-Tracy =

Hanbury-Tracy is a surname, and may refer to:

- Charles Hanbury-Tracy, 1st Baron Sudeley (1778–1858), British politician and peer
- Charles Hanbury-Tracy, 4th Baron Sudeley (1840–1922), British politician and peer
- Merlin Hanbury-Tracy, 7th Baron Sudeley (1939–2022), British peer and author
- Frederick Hanbury-Tracy (1848–1906), British politician
- Henry Hanbury-Tracy (1802–1889), British politician
- Sudeley Hanbury-Tracy, 3rd Baron Sudeley (1837–1877), British colliery owner and peer
- Thomas Hanbury-Tracy, 2nd Baron Sudeley (1801–1863), British colliery owner and politician

== See also ==
- Hanbury (surname)
- Tracy (surname)
