= Hanbury (surname) =

Hanbury is a surname, and may refer to:

- Benjamin Hanbury (1778–1864), English nonconformist historian
- Capel Hanbury (1707–1765), Anglo-Welsh businessman and politician
- Cecil Hanbury (1871–1937), British politician, son of Thomas Hanbury
- Charles Addington Hanbury (c.1828-1900), English brewer
- Charlotte Hanbury, English philanthropist 1830–1900
- Daniel Hanbury (1825–1875), British botanist and pharmacologist
- Edwin Hanbury (1848–1914), English cricketer
- Elizabeth Hanbury (1793–1901), British philanthropist
- Frederick Janson Hanbury (1851–1938), English businessman and naturalist
- George L. Hanbury II (born 1943), American academic
- Harold Hanbury (1898–1993), British academic and jurist
- Harry A. Hanbury (1863–1940), American politician from New York State
- Hilda Hanbury (1875–1961), British actress and stage beauty
- Jack Hanbury (1904–1968), British film producer
- James Arthur Hanbury (1832–1908), Irish surgeon-general
- John Hanbury (1664–1734) (1664–1734), British ironmaster and politician
- John Hanbury (1744–1784) (1744–1784), British politician, son of Capel Hanbury
- John Hanbury (hurler) (born 1993), Irish hurler
- John Hanbury (MP) (1574–1658), English politician
- John Hanbury-Williams (1859–1946), British Army general
- John Coldbrook Hanbury-Williams (1892–1965), British businessman and courtier
- Lily Hanbury (1873–1908), English actress
- Marie Frances Lisette Hanbury (1868–1941), British peeress and suffragist
- Octavius Hanbury (1826–1882), English cricketer
- Osgood Hanbury (1917–1943), British WWII flying ace
- Robert Culling Hanbury (1823–1867), British politician
- Robert William Hanbury (1845–1903), British politician
- Robert Hanbury Brown ((1916–2002), British astronomer and physicist
- Rose Hanbury (born 1984), English model and peeress
- Rhys Hanbury (born 1985), Australian rugby league footballer
- Thomas Hanbury (1832–1907), English businessman, gardener and philanthropist
- Thomas Hanbury (MP) (c.1572–1617), English politician
- Una Hanbury (1904–1990), American sculptor
- Victor Hanbury (1897–1954), British film director and producer
- Wilfred Hanbury (1887–1966), Canadian politician
- W. F. J. Hanbury (1847–1938), English Anglican priest

== See also ==
- Harbury (surname)
- Bateman-Hanbury
- Hanbury-Tenison
- Hanbury-Tracy
