= Hanbury =

Hanbury may refer to:

== People ==
- Hanbury (surname)

== Places ==
- Giardini Botanici Hanbury (Hanbury Botanical Gardens), Liguria, Italy, named after Thomas Hanbury
- Hanbury, Staffordshire
- Hanbury, Worcestershire
- Hanbury, Ontario, Canada
- Hanbury Hall, Worcestershire
- Hanbury Island, Nunavut, Canada
- Hanbury Manor, Hertfordshire, a hotel and country club
- Hanbury Street, street running between Spitalfields and Whitechapel, Tower Hamlets, London
