= Baron Sudeley =

Barony in the Peerage of England

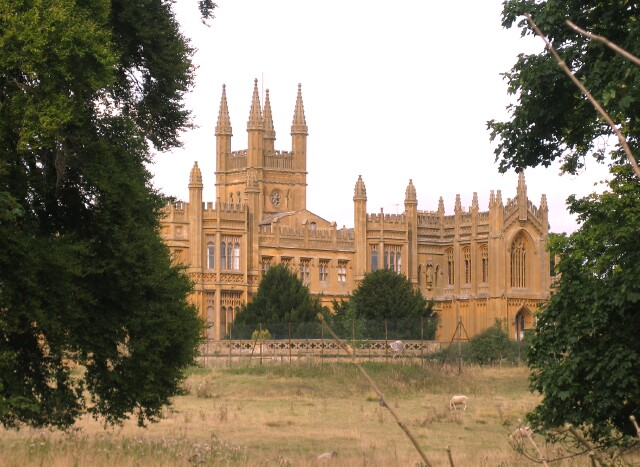
Toddington Manor, the former seat of the Barons Sudeley.

Baron Sudeley is a hereditary title that has been created three times in the history of Britain, twice in the Peerage of England and once in the Peerage of the United Kingdom. The first creation came in the Peerage of England in 1299 when John de Sudeley was summoned to Parliament as Lord Sudeley. On the death of the third Baron in 1367 the title fell into abeyance. The abeyance was terminated in 1380 when Thomas Boteler, the fourth Baron, became the sole heir. The sixth Baron was created Baron Sudeley by letters patent in 1441. He served as Lord High Treasurer from 1444 to 1447 and commissioned Sudeley Castle. On his death in 1473, the 1441 creation became extinct while the 1299 creation once again fell into abeyance.

The third creation came in the Peerage of the United Kingdom in 1838 when Charles Hanbury-Tracy was created Baron Sudeley, of Toddington in the County of Gloucester. He had previously represented Tewkesbury in the House of Commons as a Whig and served as Lord Lieutenant of Montgomeryshire. He was also Chairman of the Royal Commission appointed to judge designs for the new Houses of Parliament. He married his cousin Henrietta Susanna, daughter and heiress of Henry Leigh Tracy, 8th and last Viscount Tracy, through which marriage the estate of Toddington Manor in Gloucestershire came into the Hanbury family. Five days before the marriage Charles Hanbury assumed the additional surname of Tracy.

He was succeeded by his son, the second Baron. He sat as a Member of Parliament for Wallingford and served as Lord Lieutenant of Montgomeryshire. In 1806 Lord Sudeley assumed by Royal licence the surname of Leigh in lieu of his patronymic. However, in 1839 he discontinued the use of this surname and resumed by Royal licence his original surname of Hanbury-Tracy. On his death, the title passed to his son, the third Baron. He was also Lord Lieutenant of Montgomeryshire. He was succeeded by his younger brother, the fourth Baron. He was a Liberal Member of Parliament for Montgomery from 1863 to 1877 and served under William Ewart Gladstone as Captain of the Corps of Gentlemen-at-Arms in 1886. However, he later came into financial difficulties which caused the sale of the family seat of Toddington Manor.

The title is currently held by the eighth Baron (a member of the collateral branch of the family), who succeeded the seventh Baron on 5 September 2022.

== Barons Sudeley; First and Second creation (1299 and 1441) ==
- John de Sudeley, 1st Baron Sudeley (c. 1257–1336)
- John de Sudeley, 2nd Baron Sudeley (d. 1340)
- John de Sudeley, 3rd Baron Sudeley (c. 1337–1367) (abeyant)
- Thomas Boteler, 4th Baron Sudeley (1355–1398) (abeyance terminated 1380)
- John Boteler, 5th Baron Sudeley (d. 1417)
- Ralph Boteler, 6th Baron Sudeley (d. 1473) (created Baron Sudeley in 1441; in 1473, first creation abeyant, second extinct)

== Barons Sudeley; Third creation, 1838 ==
- Charles Hanbury-Tracy, 1st Baron Sudeley (1778–1858)
- Thomas Charles Hanbury-Tracy, 2nd Baron Sudeley (1801–1863)
- Sudeley Charles George Hanbury-Tracy, 3rd Baron Sudeley (1837–1877)
- Charles Douglas Richard Hanbury-Tracy, 4th Baron Sudeley (1840–1922)
- William Charles Frederick Hanbury-Tracy, 5th Baron Sudeley (1870–1932)
- Richard Algernon Frederick Hanbury-Tracy, 6th Baron Sudeley (1911–1941)
- Merlin Charles Sainthill Hanbury-Tracy, 7th Baron Sudeley (1939–2022)
- Nicholas Edward John Hanbury-Tracy, 8th Baron Sudeley (b. 1959)

The heir presumptive is the present holder's half-brother Hon. Timothy Christopher Claud Hanbury-Tracy (b. 1968). The heir presumptive’s heir apparent is his son, Maximilian John Claud Hanbury-Tracy (b. 2004).

=== Line of Succession ===
- Charles Hanbury-Tracy, 1st Baron Sudeley (1778—1858)
  - Thomas Charles Hanbury-Tracy, 2nd Baron Sudeley (1801—1863)
    - Sudeley Charles George Hanbury-Tracy, 3rd Baron Sudeley (1837—1877)
    - Charles Douglas Richard Hanbury-Tracy, 4th Baron Sudeley (1840—1922)
      - William Charles Frederick Hanbury-Tracy, 5th Baron Sudeley (1870—1932)
      - Major Algernon Henry Charles Hanbury-Tracy (1871—1915)
        - Richard Algenon Frederick Hanbury-Tracy, 6th Baron Sudeley (1911—1941)
      - Felix Charles Hubert Hanbury-Tracy (1882—1914)
        - Michael David Charles Hanbury-Tracy (1909—1940)
          - Merlin Charles Sainthill Hanbury-Tracy, 7th Baron Sudeley (1939–2022)
    - Frederick Stephen Archibald Hanbury-Tracy (1848—1906)
      - Major Eric Thomas Henry Hanbury-Tracy (1871—1953)
        - Claud Edward Frederick Hanbury-Tracy-Domvile (1904—1987)
          - Desmond Andrew John Hanbury-Tracy (1928—2013)
            - Nicholas Edward John Hanbury-Tracy, 8th Baron Sudeley (born 1959)
            - (1) Timothy Christopher Claud Hanbury-Tracy (b. 1968)
              - (2) Maximilian John Claud Hanbury-Tracy (b. 2004)
          - Charles William Justin Hanbury-Tracy (1938—2024)
            - (3) Justin Hanbury-Tracy (b. 1971)
            - (4) Edward Claud Hanbury-Tracy (b. 1976)
  - Henry Hanbury-Tracy (1802—1889)
    - Charles Henry Tamworth Hanbury-Tracy (1842—1923)
    - Arthur Hanbury-Tracy (1843—1856)

=== Arms ===
Coat of arms of Baron Sudeley
Crest "1st, on a chapeau gules, turned up ermine, an escallop sable, between two wings or; 2nd, out of a mural coronet sable, a demi-lion rampant or, holding in the paws a battle-axe sable, helved gold." Escutcheon "Quarterly: 1st and 4th or, an escallop in the chief point sable, between two bendlets gules" (Tracy); "2nd and 3rd or, a bend engrailed vert plain cotised sable" (Hanbury). Supporters "On either side a falcon, wings elevated proper, beaked and belled or." Motto Memoria Pii Æterna "The pious are held in everlasting remembrance" Badge "A fire beacon, and in front thereof and chained thereto a panther ducally gorged, the tail nowed".

== See also ==
- Baron Seymour of Sudeley
- Baron Sudley
- Viscount Tracy
