= Eva Anstruther =

English writer and poet (1869–1935)

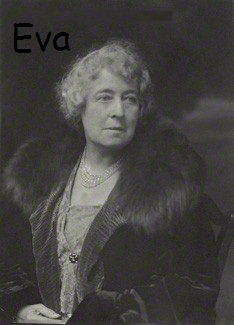
- Born: Eva Isabella Henrietta Hanbury-Tracy; 25 January 1869; London, England
- Died: 19 June 1935 (aged 66); Chelsea, West London, England
- Occupations: Writer and poet
- Spouse: Henry Torrens Anstruther (m. 1889; div. 1915)
- Children: 2; including Jan Struther
- Parents: Charles Hanbury-Tracy (father); Ada Sudeley (mother)

Dame Eva Anstruther DBE (née Hanbury-Tracy; 25 January 1869 – 19 June 1935) was an English writer and poet. During World War I, she organised libraries for troops and prisoners of war in France, for which she was appointed Dame Commander of the Order of the British Empire in 1918.

== Early life ==
Anstruther was born in London on 25 January 1869. She was the eldest child of Charles Hanbury-Tracy, 4th Baron Sudeley and his wife, Ada Maria Katherine Tollemache, daughter of the Honourable Frederick James Tollemache and Isabella Anne Forbes.

== Career ==
Anstruther wrote poems, newspaper columns, short stories, plays and several novels. She was supportive of women's work and, in an article for the Nineteenth Century periodical, argued that as an increasing number of women went to work outside of the family home, a "feminine clubland" that helped women to professionally network was indicative of how women's social circles were growing beyond biological family. She also wrote for other publications, including publishing short stories in Harper's New Monthly Magazine.

During World War I, Anstruther was the director of operations of the Camps Library, whose director was Sir Edward Ward. The Camps Library was a charitable organisation responsible for stocking "Soldiers Libraries" for troops and prisoners of war in France. Anstruther was able to use her contacts in the publishing industry to obtain remaindered books for the libraries. The books were sorted and shipped by volunteers. For this service Anstruther was appointed a Dame Commander of the Order of the British Empire in the New Years Honours list in 1918.

== Personal life ==
Anstruther married Liberal Unionist politician Henry Torrens Anstruther in 1889 (they divorced in 1915). The couple had two children, Douglas and Joyce, the latter of who became a writer using the name Jan Struther.

== Death ==
Anstruther died at her home in Chelsea, West London, from bronchial pneumonia on 19 June 1935, aged 66.

== Selected works ==
- Ebb and Flow (1894) short story
- The Influence of Mars (1900) short stories
- Old Clothes (1904) play
- A Lady in Waiting (1905) fiction
- Fido (1907) play
- The Whirligig (1908) play
- My Lonely Soldier (1916) play
- The Vanished Kitchen-Maid (1920) article
