= Henry Tracy =

Henry Tracy may refer to:

- Henry Wells Tracy (1807–1886), member of the U.S. House of Representatives from Pennsylvania
- Henry Leigh Tracy, 8th Viscount Tracy (1732–1797)

== See also ==
- Harry Tracy (1875–1902), outlaw in the American Old West
