= Charles Hanbury-Tracy =

Charles Hanbury-Tracy may refer to:

- Charles Hanbury-Tracy, 1st Baron Sudeley (1778–1858), British Whig politician
- Charles Hanbury-Tracy, 4th Baron Sudeley (1840–1922), British Liberal politician
