= Jim Tracy =

Jim Tracy may refer to:

- Jim Tracy (baseball) (born 1955), American professional baseball player
- Jim Tracy (politician) (1956–2026), American politician from Tennessee
- Jim Tracy (ski), American skiing coach

== See also ==
- James Tracy (disambiguation)
