= Viscount Tracy =

Title in the Peerage of Ireland

Viscount Tracy, of Rathcoole in the County of Dublin, was a title in the Peerage of Ireland. It was created on 12 January 1643 for Sir John Tracy, previously Member of Parliament for Gloucestershire. He was made Baron Tracy, of Rathcoole in the County of Dublin, at the same time, also in the Peerage of Ireland. The second Viscount also represented Gloucestershire in Parliament. The titles are considered to have become extinct on the death of the eighth Viscount in 1797. However, the peerages were the subjects of at least four claims presented to the House of Lords during the 19th century.

The first Viscount was the great-grandson of William Tracy, eldest son of William Tracy. The latter's second son, Richard Tracy, was granted the Stanway estate in Gloucestershire by his father. Richard Tracy was the father of Paul Tracy, who was created a baronet in 1611 (see Tracy baronets).

The family seat was Toddington Manor in Gloucestershire. The Hon. Henrietta Susanna, daughter and heiress of the eighth and last Viscount, married her cousin Charles Hanbury, through which marriage Toddington manor came into the Hanbury family. Charles Hanbury assumed the additional surname of Tracy and was elevated to the peerage as Baron Sudeley in 1838.

== Viscounts Tracy (1643) ==
- John Tracy, 1st Viscount Tracy (died 1648)
- Robert Tracy, 2nd Viscount Tracy (c. 1593–1662)
- John Tracy, 3rd Viscount Tracy (1617–1687)
- William Tracy, 4th Viscount Tracy (1657–1712)
- Thomas Charles Tracy, 5th Viscount Tracy (1690–1756)
- Thomas Charles Tracy, 6th Viscount Tracy (1719–1792)
- John Tracy, 7th Viscount Tracy (1722–1793)
- Henry Leigh Tracy, 8th Viscount Tracy (1732–1797)
