= De Tracy =

de Tracy is a surname, and may refer to:

- Alexandre de Prouville de Tracy (c.1603–1670), French military leader and statesman
- William de Tracy, 12th-century Anglo-Norman nobleman and assassin of Thomas Becket

== See also ==
- Destutt de Tracy
- Tracy (surname)
