= Bateman-Hanbury =

Bateman-Hanbury is a surname, and may refer to:

- Charles Bateman-Hanbury-Kincaid-Lennox (1827–1912), British politician
- William Bateman-Hanbury, 1st Baron Bateman (1780–1845), British politician and peer
- William Bateman-Hanbury, 2nd Baron Bateman (1826–1901), British politician and peer

== See also ==
- Bateman (surname)
- Hanbury (surname)
