= Batmaz =

Batmaz is a surname. Notable people with the surname include:

- Ergün Batmaz (born 1967), Turkish weightlifter
- Malik Batmaz (born 2000), German footballer

== See also ==
- Batman (surname)
