= Batman (surname) =

Batman is an English surname. It has no connection to the fictional superhero, except that it may also be related to the mammal. Bateman, Baitman and Battman all have the same origin, and the earliest known version may be Bathemanus, recorded as a given name in 1222. They all derive from the personal name Bat(t)(e), which was likely a short form of Bartholomew, used in honor of the apostle, but it could also have come from the Germanic Bertram or an unattested Old English name meaning “cudgel”. The Bat spelling in particular could even refer to the animal. The “man” suffix may be simply hypocoristic, or it may mean "a friend or servant of [Bat]”.

== People with the name ==
- Daniel Batman (1981–2012), Australian sprinter
- Ira Coleman Batman (1862–1934), American jurist and politician
- John Batman (1801–1839), one of the founders of Melbourne, Australia
- Stephen Batman (fl. 1534–1584), English translator and author

== See also ==
- Batman (disambiguation)
- Batman v. Commissioner, a US court case involving Ray and Gerald Batman
- Jacques-Louis Battmann (1818–1886), French organist and composer
