= James Tracy =

James Tracy may refer to:

- James Tracy (historian) (born 1938), American historian
- James Tracy (conspiracy theorist) (born 1965), American academic, communication scholar, and conspiracy theorist
- James Tracy (activist) (born 1970), American writer and political activist
- James Tracy (rugby union) (born 1991), Irish rugby union player

== See also ==
- Jim Tracy (disambiguation)
- James Tracy Hale (1810–1865), member of the U.S. House of Representatives from Pennsylvania
