= Hugh Bateman =

Hugh Bateman may refer to:

- Sir Hugh Bateman, 1st Baronet (1756–1824), of the Bateman baronets
- Hugh Bateman-Champain (1869–1933), British Army officer and cricketer

== See also ==
- Bateman (surname)
