= St Andrew's Church, Toddington =

Church in Toddington, Gloucestershire, England

St Andrew's Church
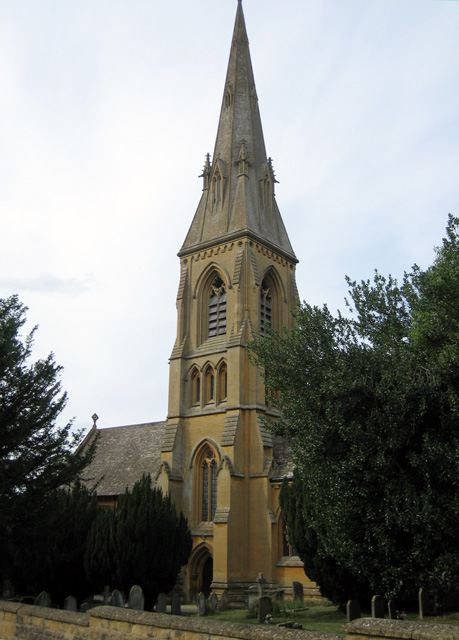
- St Andrew's Church
- 51.9962°N 1.9503°W
- Denomination: Anglican

History
- Former name(s): St Leonard's, Toddington
- Status: Active
- Founded: before 1666
- Dedication: St Andrew

Architecture
- Heritage designation: Grade I
- Designated: 4 July 1960
- Architect: G.E. Street
- Style: Gothic Revival
- Years built: c. 1870
- Construction cost: £44,000

Specifications
- Materials: stone

Administration
- Diocese: Gloucester
- Parish: Winchcombe

St Andrew's Church, Toddington is a Grade I Listed Building in the town of Toddington, Gloucestershire, England. The present church is the third to occupy the site.

== History ==
Prior to the 1870s, the church was dedicated to St Leonard. Originally founded before 1666, the church was rebuilt for the first time in 1723 by Thomas Charles Tracy, 5th Viscount Tracy. The building of 1723 was a small Perpendicular structure, of which only very small elements are known to still exist. It was demolished in 1868 and the church was rebuilt almost entirely in 1868–69 by George Edmund Street (1824–1881). Street was commissioned by the 3rd Lord Sudeley. The work cost £44,000, equivalent to around £20 million in the 21st century. An illustration of the finished church was featured in The Building News on 5 January 1870. It was rededicated to St Andrew after the rebuild was completed. Little remains of the earlier buildings aside from some loose effigies dating from the 17th Century and three marble wall monuments from the 18th Century.

The church's large North Chapel houses the tombs of Charles Hanbury-Tracy, 1st Baron Sudeley (1778–1858) and his wife Henrietta Susanna Tracy. Lord Sudeley left £5000 towards the creation of the tombs, which were designed by John Graham Lough. The large sums of money which the family donated towards the building an upkeep of the church, combined with the agricultural depression of the late 19th Century were eventually contributory factors to the financial decline of the Hanbury-Tracy family. The church became Listed in 1960.

== Services ==
Services are held in the church on the first (Parish Communion) and fourth (family service and Evensong) Sundays of the month.

== Gallery ==
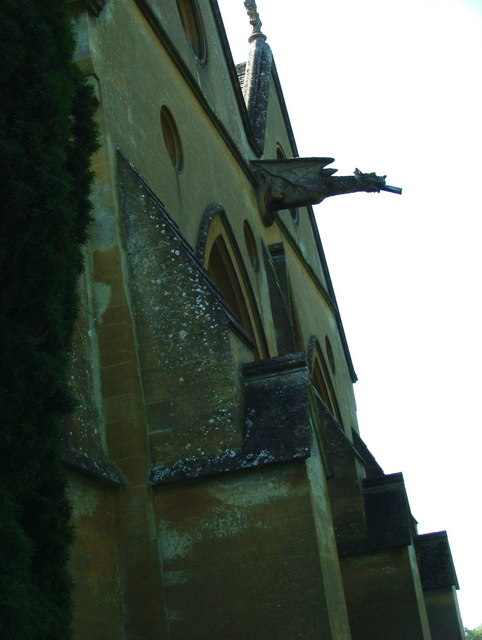
Gargoyle on St Andrew's

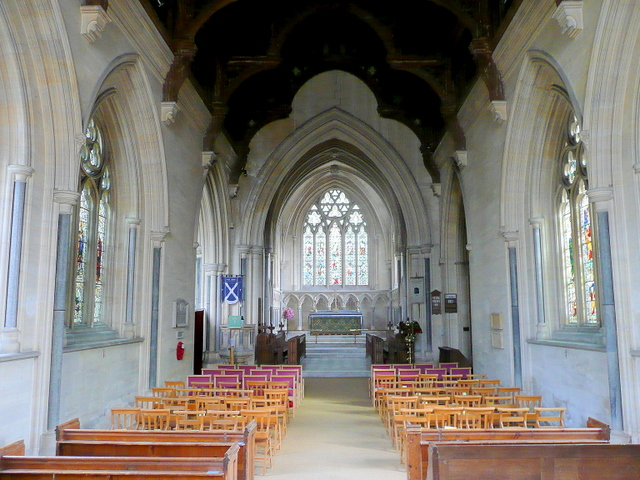
St Andrew's, interior

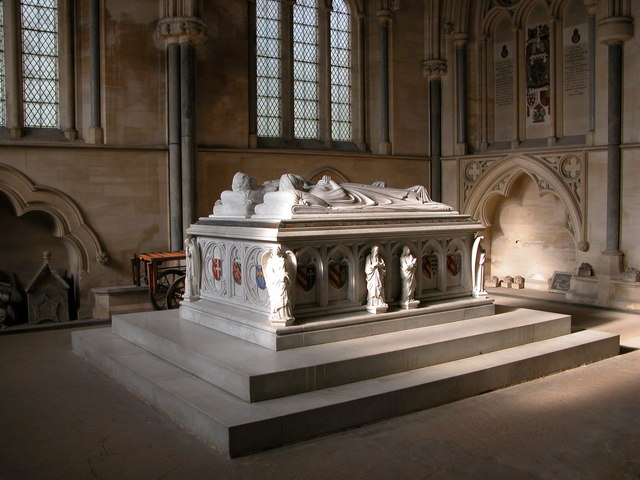
Tomb of Lord Sudeley

Arms Sudeley
