= Tracey (surname) =

Tracey is a surname, and may refer to:

- Adelle Tracey (born 1993), Jamaican middle-distance runner
- Andrew Tracey (1936–2024), South African ethnomusicologist
- AJ Tracey (born 1994), British rapper and record producer
- Brian Tracey (born 1942), New Zealand rugby league footballer and coach
- Brian Tracey (hurler) (born 1993), Irish hurler
- Brayden Tracey (born 2001), Canadian ice hockey player
- Charles Tracey (1847–1905), American politician from New York State
- Clark Tracey (born 1961), British jazz drummer, son of Stan Tracey
- Connor Tracey (born 1996), Australian rugby league footballer
- Conor Tracey (born 1997), New Zealand association football player
- Craig Tracey (born 1974), British politician
- Craig Tracey (rugby league), Australian rugby league footballer
- Daniel Tracey (1794–1832), Lower Canada doctor, journalist and politician
- Derek Tracey (born 1971), Irish association footballer
- Dianne Tracey, New Zealand marine biologist
- Dick Tracey (racing driver) (born 1945), American stock car racing driver
- Doreen Tracey (1943–2018), English actress
- Eddie Tracey (born 1923), Australian rugby league footballer
- Edward Tracey (born 1943), Irish boxer
- Evan Tracey, American communications executive
- Frank Tracey (1918–1971), England rugby league footballer
- Geoff Tracey (1930–2004), Australian rainforest ecologist
- Gerard Tracey (1954–2003), British archivist
- Howard Tracey (born 1937), Canadian politician from Yukon
- Hugh Tracey (1903–1977), English ethnomusicologist
- H. Nelson Tracey, American filmmaker
- Ian Tracey (born 1964), Canadian actor
- Ian Tracey (organist) (born 1955), British organist
- Irene Tracey (born 1966), British neuroscientist
- John Tracey (1933–1978), American football player
- John P. Tracey (1836–1910), American politician from Missouri
- Kevin J. Tracey (born 1957), American neurosurgeon and inventor
- Lindalee Tracey (1957–2006), Canadian writer, journalist and filmmaker
- Margaret Tracey (born 1967), American ballet dancer and educator
- Mary Tracey-Purcell (born 1949), Irish middle-distance runner
- Michael Tracey (commentator) (born 1988), American commentator
- Michael Tracey (producer) (born 1948), British-American academic and television producer
- Minnie Tracey (1873/4–1929, American soprano
- Olivia Tracey (born 1960), Irish model and actress
- Owen Tracey (1915–1941), New Zealand flying ace of WWII
- Patricia Ann Tracey (born 1950), United States naval officer
- Phillip Tracey (born 1963/4), Australian paralympic swimmer
- Raphael Tracey (1904–1975), American soccer playe
- Rennie K. Tracey (1874–1929), Canadian politician from New Brunswick
- Richard Tracey (1943–2020), British politician and presenter
- Richard Tracey (footballer) (born 1979), English footballer and manager
- Richard Tracey (judge) (1948–2019), Australian judge and barrister
- Richard Tracey (Royal Navy officer) (1837–1907), Royal Navy Admiral
- Sean Tracey (born 1980), American baseball pitcher
- Shilow Tracey (born 1998), English footballer
- Simon Tracey (born 1967), English football goalkeeper and scout
- Stan Tracey (1926–2013), British jazz pianist and composer
- Ted Tracey, New Zealand speedway racing driver
- Terence Tracey, American psychologist
- Tyquendo Tracey (born 1993), Jamaican sprinter
- William Tracey (1876–1945), English footballer

== See also ==
- Tracy (surname)
