= Thomas Bateman =

Thomas Bateman may refer to:

- Thomas Bateman (antiquary) (1821–1861), English antiquary
- Thomas Bateman (physician) (1778–1821), British physician and dermatology pioneer
- Tom Bateman (politician) (1922–2003), Australian politician
- Tom Bateman (actor) (born 1989), English actor
- Tom Bateman (British Army officer), British general
- Tommy Bateman (1908–1993), English motorcycle speedway rider

== See also ==
- Thomas Bateman Napier (1854–1933), British politician and judge
- Bateman (disambiguation)
