= Harbury (surname) =

Harbury is a surname. Notable people with the surname include:

- Charles Harbury (c. 1843–1928), English-born stage actor
- Jennifer Harbury (born 1951), American lawyer, author, and human rights activist
- Pehr Harbury (born 1965), American biochemist
