= Elizabeth Godfrey =

English Gold and Silversmith

- Born: Elizabeth Pantin
- Occupations: Gold- and silversmith
- Years active: 1720-1766
- Spouses: Abraham Buteux (1720-1731, his death); Benjamin Godfrey (?-1741, his death)

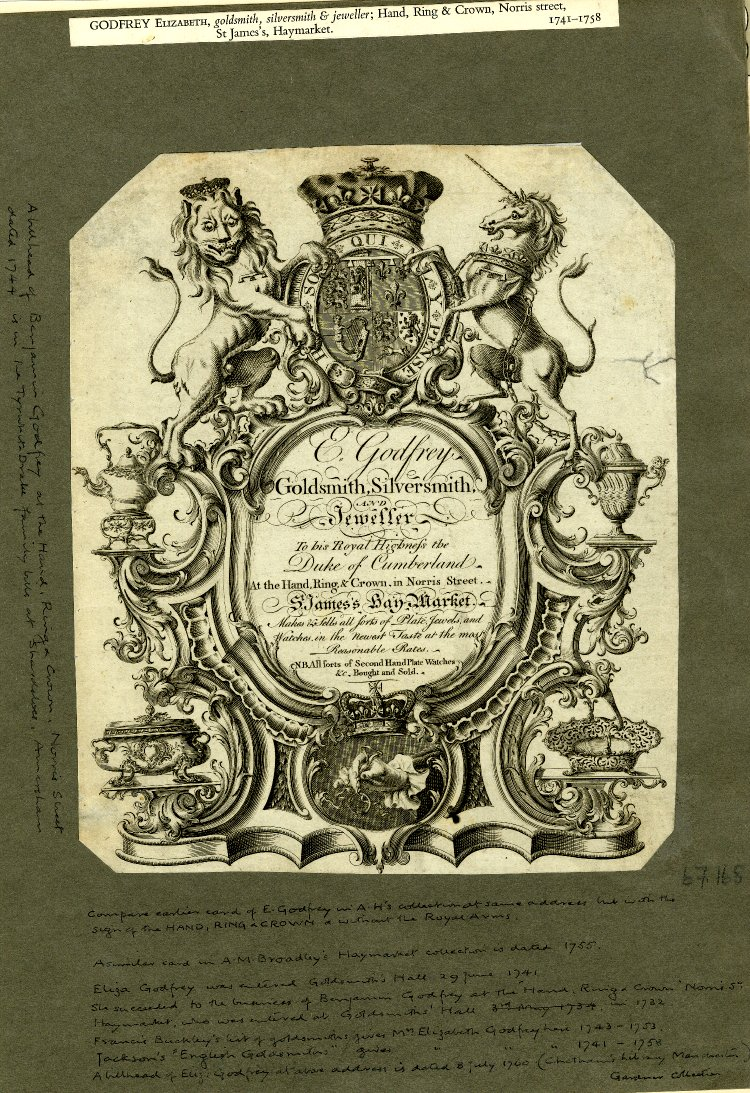
Trade card with Royal Coat of Arms

Elizabeth Godfrey, also known as Eliza Godfrey and Elizabeth Buteux (active c. 1720–1766), was an English gold- and silversmith. She has been called "the most outstanding woman goldsmith of her generation."

== Early life ==
The daughter of Simon Pantin, a renowned silversmith himself, Godfrey was born in London and is believed to have been trained in her father's workshop.

== Career ==
Despite obvious success as an artist in her own right, her work has been largely periodised by her marriages to men. Godfrey married twice, both times to silversmiths with whom she shared her business in London. In 1720 she wed Abraham Buteux. After his death eleven years later, Godfrey began to run the firm on her own. She later married Benjamin Godfrey, who is believed to have been in her employ. He died in 1741, at which point she again began to head the business by herself, a period in which her firm's skill at producing increasingly popular Rococo aesthetics garnered loyal clientele. Until recently, Godfrey was thought to have been active until 1758. However, recent research has revealed that she was active until at least 1766. This was a period when many women traders were active in London, and the luxury trades were a sector in which they were particularly successful. Godfrey was, for instance, a contemporary of Hester Bateman.

Her works were known for their high quality and sophisticated style. Godfrey described herself on trade cards as "Goldsmith, Silversmith, and Jeweller, [who] makes and sells all sorts of plates, jewels, and watches, in the newest taste at the most reasonable rates." Her patrons included a number of nobles and their families— notably the Duke of Cumberland. Her work was influenced by French Huguenot traditions of silversmithing.

== Gallery ==
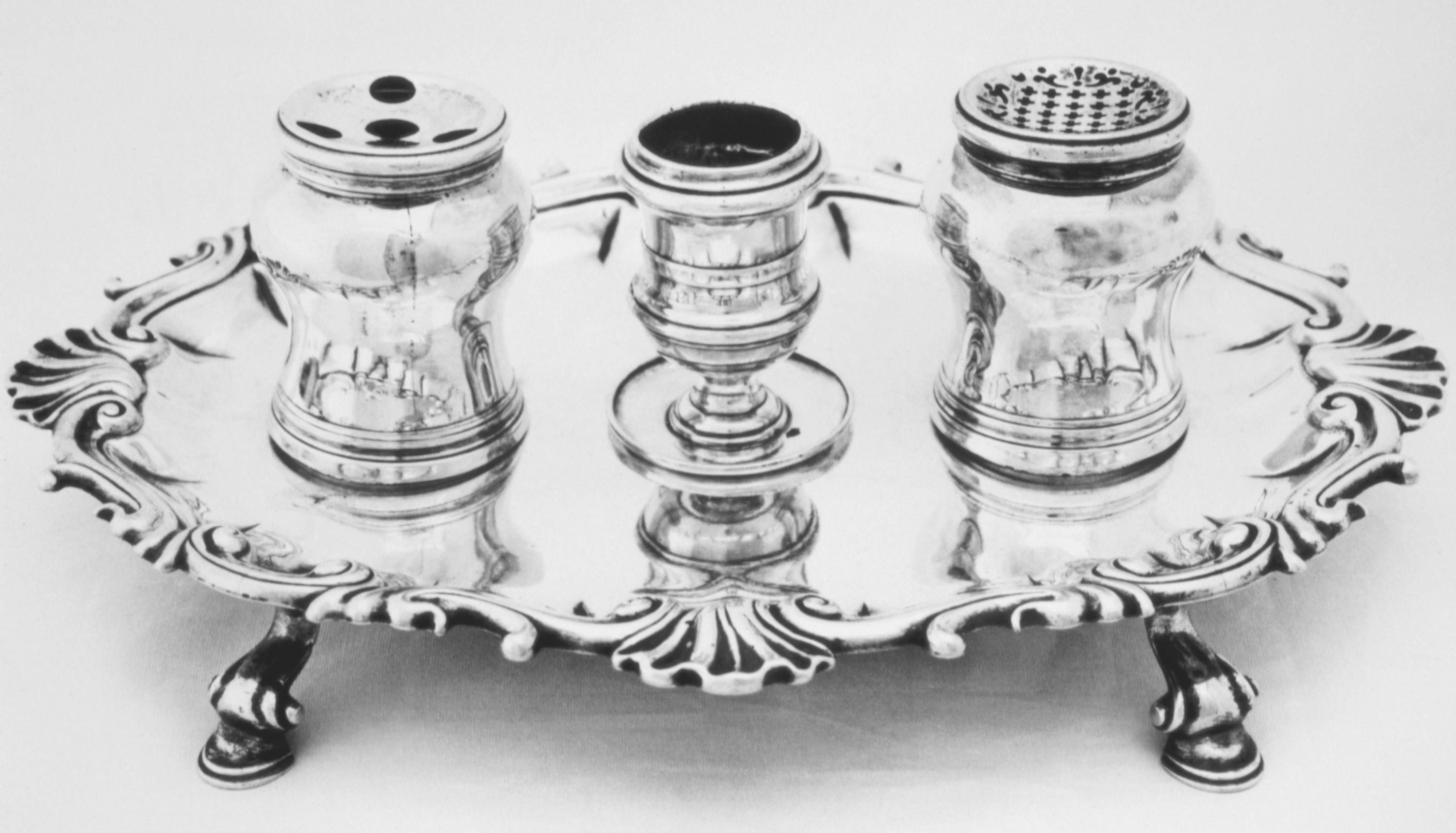
Inkstand
