= James Bateman =

James Bateman may refer to:

- James Bateman (horticulturist) (1811–1897), British landowner and horticulturist
- James Bateman (artist) (1893–1959), English painter of rural scenes
- James Bateman (MP), MP for Carlisle
- James Bateman (banker) (c. 1660–1718), English merchant, Lord Mayor of London and Governor of the Bank of England
- Jamie Bateman (born 1954), Canadian former professional ice hockey
- Jim Bateman (1925–1987), New Zealand politician and educationalist
- Henry Gibson (1935–2009), American actor and comedian, born James Bateman

== See also ==
- Bateman (disambiguation)
