= Hanbury-Tenison =

Hanbury-Tenison is a surname. Notable people with the surname include:

- Marika Hanbury-Tenison (1938–1982), English journalist, cookery writer and explorer
- Richard Hanbury-Tenison (1925–2017), British diplomat
- Robin Hanbury-Tenison (born 1936), English explorer

== See also ==
- Hanbury (surname)
- Tenison
