= John Tracy, 7th Viscount Tracy =

British peer and academic (1722–1793)

The Viscount Tracy
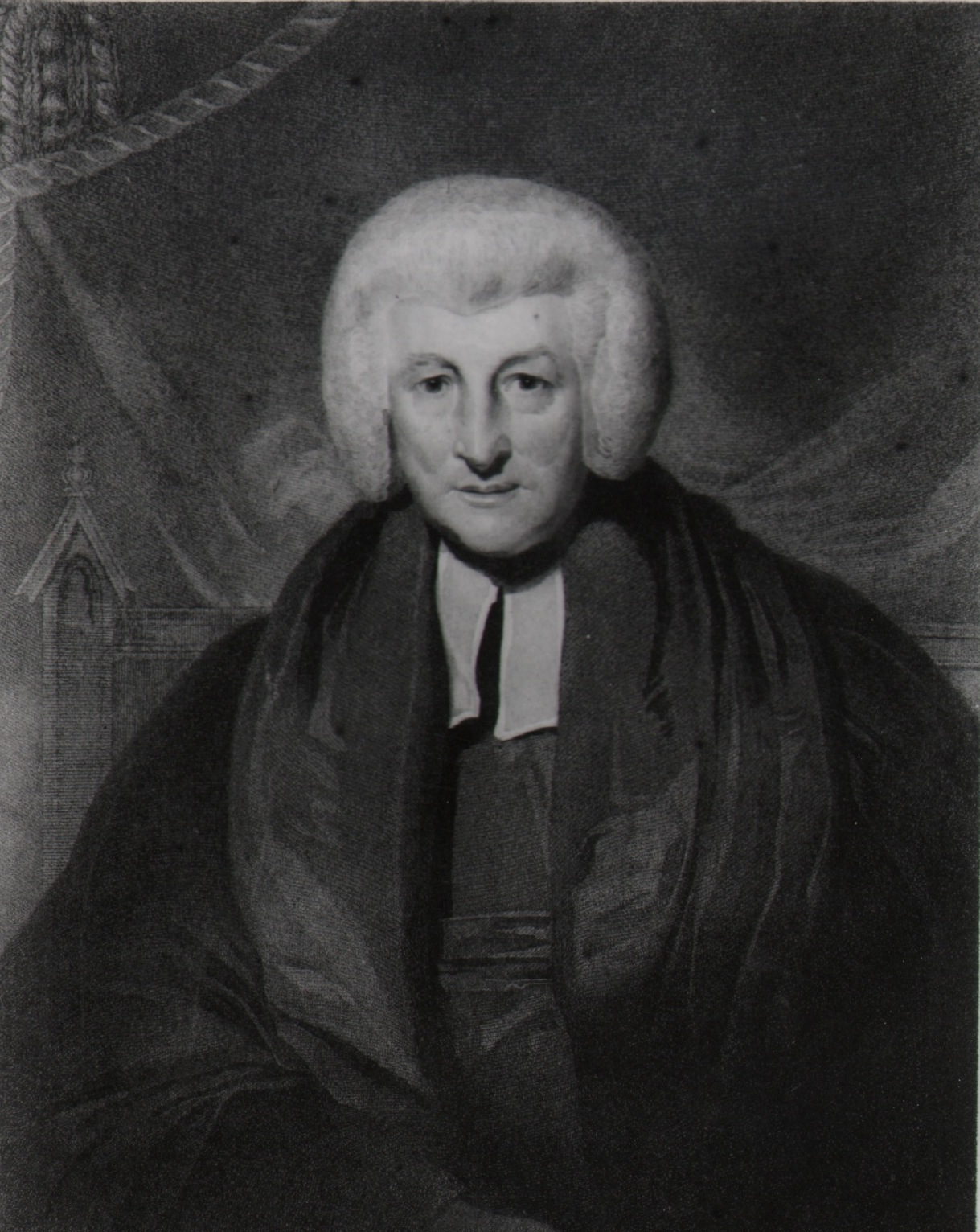
- John Tracy - Warden of All Souls College
- Born: 18 August 1722
- Died: 2 February 1793 (aged 70)

John Tracy, 7th Viscount Tracy (18 August 1722 – 2 February 1793) was a British peer and academic, who served as Warden of All Souls College, Oxford.

== Family and Title ==
Tracy was the third son of Thomas Charles Tracy, 5th Viscount Tracy, and the first son by his second wife Frances Pakington, daughter of Sir John Pakington Bt MP.

Viscount Tracy is the title given to Rathcoole in the County of Dublin, a title in the Peerage of Ireland. However, the Tracy family is English, with its seat at Toddington, Gloucestershire.

Tracy succeeded to the viscountcy on the death of his half-brother Thomas Charles Tracy, 6th Viscount Tracy in 1792, and on his death in 1793 was followed by his brother Henry Leigh Tracy, 8th Viscount Tracy.

== Education and career ==
He was educated at John Roysse's Free School in Abingdon (now Abingdon School) from 1732 to 1741.

He matriculated at University College, Oxford in 1741, graduating B.A. 1745, M.A. 1749 (at All Souls), B.D. 1757, D.D. 1761.

Tracy was university proctor in 1755, and was elected Warden of All Souls College, Oxford in 1766, remaining Warden until his death. He was for one year vicar of Farnborough (1768–69).

He was a Steward of the Old Abingdonian Club in 1745.

== See also ==
- List of Old Abingdonians

Peerage of Ireland
Preceded by Thomas Charles Tracy	Viscount Tracy; 1792–1793	Succeeded by Henry Leigh Tracy
Academic offices
Preceded by Stephen Niblett	Warden of All Souls College, Oxford; 1766–1793	Succeeded by Edmund Isham
