= William Tracy (JP) =

English justice and Lutheran convert (died 1530)

William Tracy (died 1530) was an English justice of the peace and prominent early Lutheran convert. After his death both his will and his remains became caught up in the struggle around the Protestant Reformation in England.

== Life ==
He was a justice in the reigns of Henry VII and Henry VIII, and was made sheriff in 1513. He adopted Martin Luther's religious views, and shortly before his death in October 1530 he made a will in which he expressed his belief in justification by faith, and refused to make any bequests to the clergy. Objection was taken to the will as an heretical document when it came to be proved in the ecclesiastical courts, and eventually it was brought before convocation. After prolonged discussions, the will was pronounced heretical on 27 February 1532 by Archbishop William Warham. Tracy was declared unworthy of Christian burial, and Warham directed Dr. Thomas Parker, vicar-general of the bishop of Worcester, to exhume Tracy's body. Parker exceeded his instructions, and had Tracy's remains burnt at the stake.

== Aftermath ==
Richard Tracy, the younger son who, with his mother, was executor to the will, induced Thomas Cromwell to take the matter up, and Parker had eventually to pay a fine. Tracy's will became a sort of sacred text to the reformers; possessing copies of it was frequently made a charge against them. In 1535 was published The Testament of Master Wylliam Tracie, esquier, expounded both by William Tindall (i.e. William Tyndale, who knew Tracy well) and Jhō Frith (i.e. John Frith); other editions appeared in 1546, 1548 and 1550. Hugh Latimer, John Bale, and James Pilkington all used the incident in polemic fashion against the Catholic clergy.

== Family ==
By his wife Margaret, daughter of Sir Thomas Throckmorton, William Tracy had issue two sons, William and Richard. William, the elder, inherited the Toddington estates, and was great-grandfather of Sir John Tracy, in 1642–43 created Baron and Viscount Tracy of Rathcoole in the peerage of Ireland. Robert Tracy, the judge, was younger son of the second viscount. The peerage became extinct on the death of Henry Leigh Tracy, 8th Viscount Tracy on 29 April 1797.

Through his sister Elizabeth he was uncle to James Bainham, who was executed for heresy in 1532.
