= Lee Tracy (artist) =

American artist based in Chicago

- Born: Maine, U.S.
- Education: School of the Art Institute of Chicago
- Known for: Painting

Lee Tracy is a Chicago-area artist. She was born in Maine.

She has received numerous grants from the Illinois Arts Council and has had solo shows at the Lyons Weir Gallery, Artemisia Gallery, and Vedanta Gallery in Chicago. She appeared in "The Chicago Art Scene". In the summer of 2007 she participated in Chicago's ecologically themed Public Art project, Cool Globes: Hot Ideas for a Cooler Planet.

Lee Tracy received a Bachelor of Fine Arts in Painting from School of the Art Institute of Chicago in 1989. She also attended Milwaukee Institute of Art & Design and The Art Institute of Boston.
