= Arthur Bateman =

Arthur Bateman may refer to:

- Arthur Bateman (cricketer) (1890–1918), Irish cricketer
- Arthur Bateman (footballer, born 1908) (1908–1988), English footballer
- Arthur Bateman (footballer, born 1918) (1918–1984), English footballer
- Arthur Bateman (politician) (1879–1957), British member of parliament for Camberwell North, 1931–1935
