= Richard Bateman (cricketer) =

English cricketer

Personal information
- Born: 29 April 1849; Farnham, Surrey, England
- Died: 5 November 1913 (aged 64); Ash Vale, Surrey, England

Domestic team information
- Years: Team
- 1883: Hampshire

Career statistics
Competition	First-class
Matches	1
Runs scored	18
Batting average	18.00
100s/50s	0/0
Top score	14*
Catches/stumpings	0/–
- Source: Cricinfo, 3 January 2010

Richard Bateman JP (29 April 1849 – 5 November 1913) was an English first-class cricketer.

The son of Daniel Bateman, he was born at Farnham in April 1849. A forage contractor by profession, he made a single first-class appearance for Hampshire against Somerset at Taunton in 1883. He was dismissed for 4 runs in Hampshire's first innings by Alfred Evans and ended their second innings unbeaten on 14. Later in life, he was a councillor on Hampshire County Council for Aldershot East and was a justice of the peace for West Surrey. While partaking in a hunt with the Aldershot-based Guard's Hunt on 4 November 1913, Bateman fell from his horse after it had tripped on a rabbit hole. He was seriously injured and lost consciousness, which he never regained, dying the following evening at his house in Ash Vale, Surrey.
