= Charles Harbury =

English-born stage actor

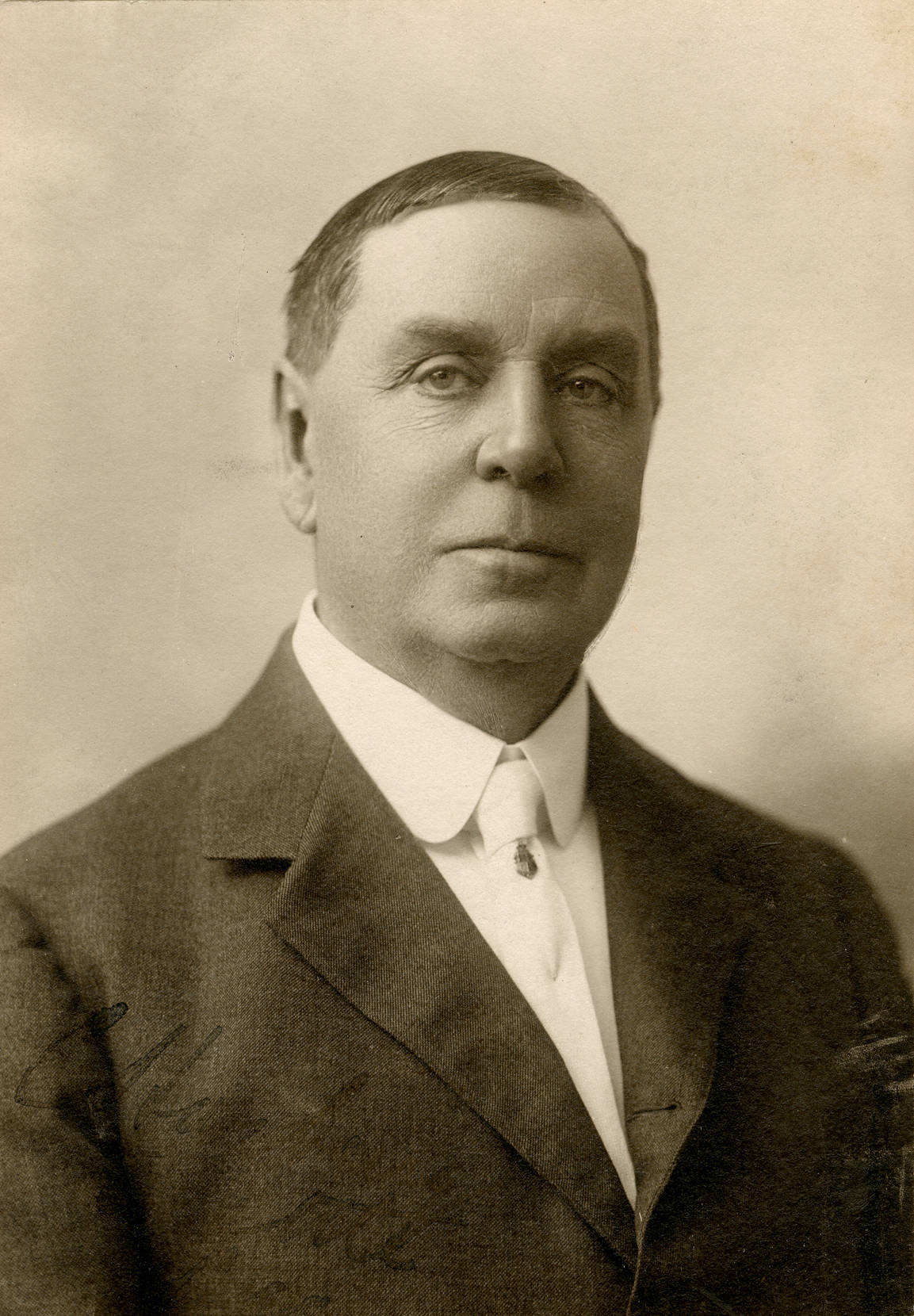
- Born: c. 1843; England
- Died: January 6, 1928; Richmond, New York (Ontario County)
- Resting place: Kensico Cemetery Valhalla, New York
- Occupation: Actor

Edward Charles Herring (c. 1843 – 1928), known on the stage as Charles Harbury, was an English-born stage actor with a long list of Broadway support and or character credits. He appeared in productions starring E. H. Sothern, Virginia Harned, Ethel Barrymore and Mrs. Fiske to name a few. He died in upstate New York and was buried in a charity plot at Kensico Cemetery.

== Selected stage productions ==
- Captain Lettarblair (1892)
- The Manoeuvres of Jane (1899-1900) (with Mary Mannering)
- When Knighthood Was in Flower (1901) (with Julia Marlowe)
- Sunday (1904) (w/Ethel Barrymore)
- The World and His Wife (1908)
- Mrs. Bumpstead-Leigh (1911) (with Mrs. Fiske)
- The Return from Jerusalem (1912)
- Oliver Twist (1912) (with Marie Doro, Constance Collier)
- Three Faces East (1918)
- Launcelot and Elaine (1921)
- The Merchant of Venice (1922–23) (with David Warfield)
