= Hanbury Island =

Island in Nunavut, Canada

- Location within Nunavut Location within Canada

Geography
- Location: Chesterfield Inlet
- Coordinates: 63°32′N 090°49′W
- Archipelago: Arctic Archipelago

Administration
- Canada
- Nunavut: Nunavut
- Region: Kivalliq

Demographics
- Population: Uninhabited

Hanbury Island is one of the uninhabited Canadian arctic islands in Kivalliq Region, Nunavut, Canada. It is one of several islands located in Chesterfield Inlet.

It is approximately 23.5 km (14.6 mi) from the Inuit hamlet of Chesterfield Inlet.
