= Thomas Hanbury-Tracy, 2nd Baron Sudeley =

British colliery owner and politician (1801–1863)

Thomas Charles Hanbury-Tracy, 2nd Baron Sudeley (5 February 1801 – 19 February 1863), known as Thomas Leigh between 1806 and 1838 and styled The Honourable Thomas Leigh between 1838 and 1839 and The Honourable Thomas Hanbury-Tracy between 1839 and 1858, was a British colliery owner and politician.

Hanbury-Tracy was the son of Charles Hanbury-Tracy, 1st Baron Sudeley, and the Honourable Henrietta Susanna Tracy, daughter of Henry Tracy, 8th Viscount Tracy. The Hanbury family derived its wealth from its ownership of the Pontypool Ironworks. In 1806 he assumed by Royal licence the surname of Leigh in lieu of his patronymic. However, in 1839 he discontinued the use of this surname and resumed by Royal licence his original surname of Hanbury-Tracy. He was returned to Parliament for Wallingford in 1831, a seat he held until 1832. On 10 February 1852, his father appointed him a deputy lieutenant of Montgomeryshire. He succeeded his father in the barony in 1858 and also succeeded him as Lord Lieutenant of Montgomeryshire, which he remained until his death five years later.

Lord Sudeley married Emma Elizabeth Alicia Pennant, daughter of George Hay Dawkins-Pennant, in 1831.

- Sudeley Hanbury-Tracy, 3rd Baron Sudeley
- Charles Hanbury-Tracy, 4th Baron Sudeley
- Frederick Stephen Archibald Hanbury-Tracy sat as Member of Parliament for Montgomery.
- Adelaide Hanbury-Tracy mother of Arthur Peel

Lord Sudeley died in February 1863, aged 62, and was succeeded in the barony by his son, Sudeley. Lady Sudeley died in July 1888.

== Arms ==
Coat of arms of Thomas Hanbury-Tracy, 2nd Baron Sudeley
Crest 1st, on a chapeau gules, turned up ermine, an escallop sable, between two wings or; 2nd, out of a mural coronet sable, a demi-lion rampant or, holding in the paws a battle-axe sable, helved gold." Escutcheon "Quarterly: 1st and 4th or, an escallop in the chief point sable, between two bendlets gules (Tracy); 2nd and 3rd or, a bend engrailed vert plain cotised sable" (Hanbury). Supporters "On either side a falcon, wings elevated proper, beaked and belled or." Motto Memoria Pii Æterna "The pious are held in everlasting remembrance" Badge "A fire beacon, and in front thereof and chained thereto a panther ducally gorged, the tail nowed."

Parliament of the United Kingdom
Preceded by William Hughes; Robert Knight	Member of Parliament for Wallingford; 1831–1832; With: Robert Knight	Succeeded by William Seymour Blackstone (Representation reduced to one member 1832)
Honorary titles
Preceded by The Lord Sudeley	Lord Lieutenant of Montgomeryshire; 1858–1863	Succeeded by The Lord Sudeley
Peerage of the United Kingdom
Preceded by Charles Hanbury-Tracy	Baron Sudeley; 1858–1863	Succeeded by Sudeley Hanbury-Tracy
