= Edwin Hanbury =

English cricketer (1848–1914)

Personal information
- Full name: Edwin Charles Hanbury
- Born: 23 June 1848; Clapham, Surrey, England
- Died: 29 September 1914 (aged 66); Ramsgate, Kent, England
- Batting: Right-handed

Domestic team information
- Years: Team
- 1871: Surrey

Career statistics
Competition	First-class
Matches	3
Runs scored	44
Batting average	11.00
100s/50s	–/–
Top score	17
Balls bowled	–
Wickets	–
Bowling average	–
5 wickets in innings	–
10 wickets in match	–
Best bowling	–
Catches/stumpings	–/–
- Source: Cricinfo, 14 April 2013

Edwin Charles Hanbury (23 June 1848 – 29 September 1914) was an English cricketer. Hanbury was a right-handed batsman. He was born at Clapham, Surrey.

Hanbury made his first-class debut for Surrey in 1871 against Kent at The Oval. He made two further first-class appearances in that season, against Gloucestershire at the Clifton College Close Ground, and Sussex at The Oval. He scored a total of 44 runs in his three appearances, at an average of 11.00, with a high score of 17.

He died at Ramsgate, Kent on 29 September 1914.
