= James Arthur Hanbury =

Irish surgeon-general (1832–1908)

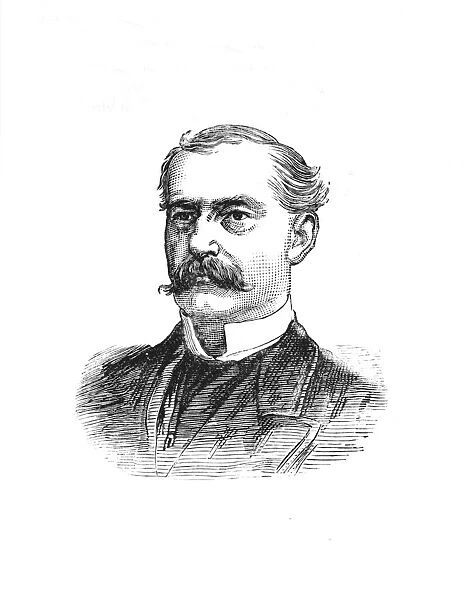
- Born: 13 January 1832; Laracor, Ireland
- Died: 2 June 1908 (aged 76); Bournemouth, England
- Occupation: Surgeon-general

James Arthur Hanbury CB KCB (13 January 1832 – 2 June 1908) was an Irish surgeon-general.

== Biography ==
Hanbury born at Somerstoun House, parish of Laracor, near Trim, County Meath, on 13 Jan. 1832, was one of the fourteen children of Samuel Hanbury, a large landowner, by his wife Louisa, daughter of Charles Ingham, rector of Kilmessan and Kilcool, County Meath. A brother, William, also in the army medical service, was with the 24th regiment when it was annihilated at the Battle of Chillianwala in 1849, assisted Florence Nightingale in establishing the hospital at Scutari, and was in charge of Netley Hospital until his death. Another brother. Fleet-surgeon Ingham Hanbury, R.N., after distinguishing himself at Tel-el-Kebir (mentioned in despatches and the bronze decoration and C.B.), died on his way to India in 1884.

Hanbury graduated M.B. from Trinity College, Dublin, in 1853. He entered the army medical service as an assistant surgeon on 30 September 1853; was promoted surgeon on 20 February 1863; surgeon-major on 1 March 1873; brigade surgeon on 27 November 1879; deputy surgeon-general on 5 May 1881; surgeon major-general on 14 June 1887, and retired from the service on 13 January 1892. He was elected an honorary F.R.C.S. Ireland on 19 July 1883 and F.R.C.S. England, on 14 April 1887 (his diploma of membership being dated 23 February 1859).

Hanbury was quartered for some years at Halifax, Nova Scotia, before he was sent to China and thence to India. He served with the Bazar valley expedition in the Afghan war of 1878–9, and was present during the march from Kabul to the relief of Kandahar. He was under fire in the battle of 1 September in that campaign, was mentioned in despatches, received the medal and clasp, the bronze decoration, and the C.B. (1881). He was principal medical officer under Lord Wolseley during the Egyptian campaign of 1882, when he was present at the battle of Tel-el-Kebir, and for the first time caused wounds to be dressed on the battlefield. Twice mentioned in despatches, he was made K.C.B. He served as principal medical officer at the Horse Guards and at Gibraltar (1887–8), and was surgeon-general of the forces in Madras (1888–92). In 1905 he received the reward for distinguished service. Tall (6 feet 1 inch in height), alert, and handsome, of great independence and energy, Hanbury was a popular master of hounds at Ootacamund. He died at Bournemouth on 2 June 1908. He married in 1876 Hannah Emily, daughter of James Anderson of Coxlodge Hall, Northumberland, and widow of Colonel Carter, C.B.
