= Charles Tracy (art historian) =

British scholar and heritage consultant (1938–2024)

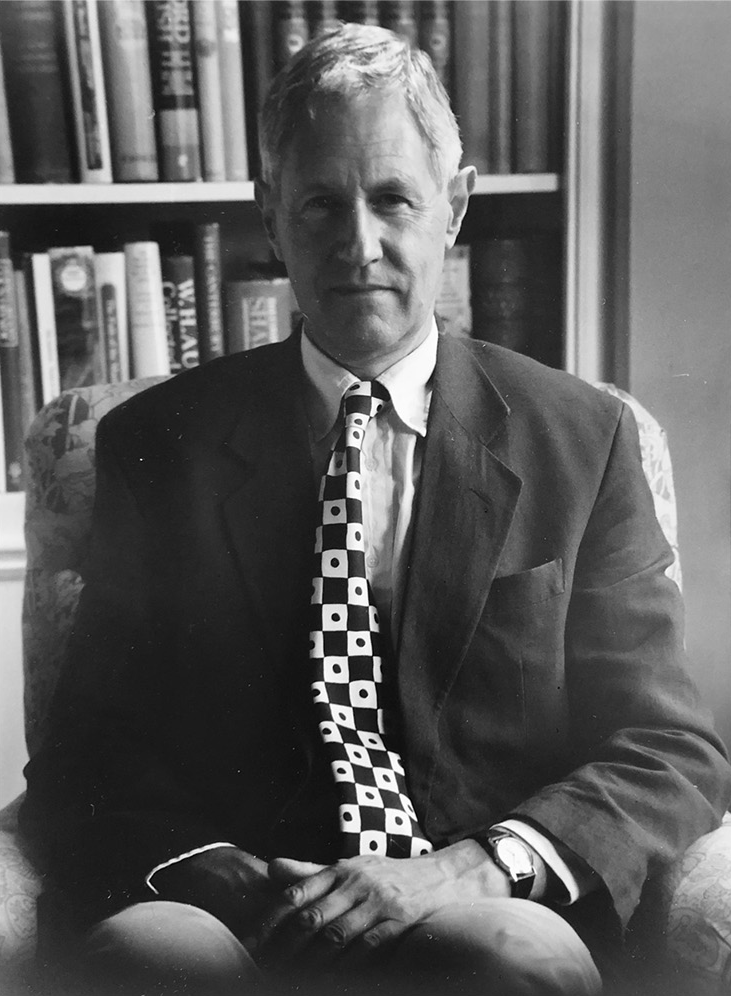
Tracy in 1992)

Charles William Justin Hanbury-Tracy (14 April 1938 – 6 March 2024) was a British scholar and heritage consultant on the history and development of medieval British and European continental church furniture. He published under the name of Charles Tracy.

== Education ==
Tracy attended Sherborne School in Dorset. He went to the Courtauld Institute of Art, University of London, in 1978 as a mature student and gained a BA (Hons) in the History of European Art in 1981. This was followed by a PhD thesis at the same institution, titled English Gothic Choir-stalls to c. 1400 (1984). Material from his thesis was later published in two volumes (1987 and 1990), titled English gothic choir-stalls. He contributed photographs to the Courtauld's Conway Library archive which are currently (2020) being digitised as part of the Courtauld Connects project.

== Career ==
Tracy was elected a Fellow of the Society of Antiquaries of London on 5 May 1994. His specialist subject was English church woodwork, especially carved chests, choir-stalls, and misericords.

He was recommended on the Victoria and Albert Museum website for further information on a late medieval carved chest from Suffolk.

He has contributed articles to the specialist Building Conservation Directory publication for historic buildings, on the topic of conserving medieval church pews and pulpits.

In 2012, Tracy was commissioned, along with Hugh Harrison, Eddie Sinclair and John Allan, to survey the early 14th century bishop's throne in Exeter Cathedral, "one of the most magnificent pieces of medieval woodwork in Europe".

In 2015–2016, Tracy was commissioned by churchwardens and the Parochial Church Council to survey the Grade I listed St Mary's Church, Watford, as the wardens prepared for renovation works.

He was a Member of Council at Suffolk Institute of Archaeology & History between 2008 and 2012, and was a director at The British Archaeological Association between 2007 and 2010.

From 1985 until 2002 he served on the Sculpture and Furnishing Committee of the Central Council for the Care of Churches (Church Buildings Council), where he was responsible for vetting requests for conservation grants, and providing expert advice.

Tracey died on 6 March 2024, at the age of 85.

== Publications ==
- English medieval furniture and woodwork, London: Victoria and Albert Museum, 1988.
- English gothic choir-stalls, 1200–1400, Woodbridge: Boydell, 1987.
- English gothic choir-stalls, Woodbridge: Boydell, 1987–1990. A discussion of the symbolic importance of choir stalls in daily church worship, with reference to the church hierarchy, physical form and position, decoration and carving techniques.
- English gothic choir-stalls, 1400–1540, Woodbridge: Boydell, 1990.
- Continental church furniture in England: a traffic in piety, Woodbridge, Suffolk: Antique Collectors' Club, 2001.
- Church furniture in medieval English and Welsh parish churches, Regional Furniture, 2007.
- Britain's medieval episcopal thrones, Havertown: Oxbow Books, 2015.

He has contributed articles to the specialist Building Conservation Directory publication for historic buildings, on the topic of conserving medieval church pews and pulpits.

=== Co-author ===
- Charles Tracy and Paul Woodfield, The Adisham "Reredos", what is it? 2003. The Reredos is in Adisham church in Kent.
- Charles Tracy and Hugh Harrison, The choir-stalls of Amiens Cathedral, Reading: Spire Books, 2004.
- Julian M. Luxford and John McNeill, The medieval chantry in England (including a chapter by Charles Tracy and Hugh Harrison, 'Thomas Spring’s Chantry and Parclose at Lavenham, Suffolk'), Leeds: Maney Publishing, for the British Archaeological Association, 2011.
- Charles Tracy, Andrew Budge and Hugh Harrison, Britain's medieval episcopal thrones: history, archaeology and conservation, Oxford and Philadelphia: Oxbow Books, 2015. This book was praised as "the first major investigation of a subject of seminal importance in the study of church history and archaeology" in the Courtauld Institute of Art's Medieval Art Research review.
- Newcastle and Northumberland: Roman and Medieval Architecture and Art, Summer Conference Transactions, Vol. 36 (including a chapter by Charles Tracy, 'The Pulpitum at Hexham Priory'), Leeds: Maney Publishing, for the British Archaeological Association, 2013.

== Family ==
Charles Tracy takes his name from his ancestor, the 1st Baron Sudeley (1778–1858). He married Sarah Jane Ashley on 8 March 1969 (divorced 1983); they had three children.

== Collection ==
In 2022 Charles Tracy donated a part of his photo collection to the project Stalla - Medieval choir stalls database managed by the Centre for Art Historical Documentation (CKD) of the Radboud University Nijmegen (Netherlands). His collection of choir stalls photos will be digitalized and documented in this database. The Stalla database can be visited online: https://stalla.rich.ru.nl/
