= Ann Bateman =

British artist (1748–1813)

- Born: 1748
- Died: 1813 (aged 64–65)
- Occupation: Silversmith

Ann-Olympe Bateman (née Dowling; 1748–1813) was an English silversmith. She married into a distinguished family of London silversmiths. She made work in the Neoclassical style in partnership with her brother-in-law, Peter Bateman. Peter and Ann's husband, Jonathan, joined the business established by their parents, Hester and Jonathan Bateman. Ann's first mark was registered in 1791, the year her husband died and left all his property to his wife. A third generation of Batemans, Ann's son, William, joined the partnership in 1800. Thus, there are silver objects that bear one, two, and even three Bateman marks. All of the Batemans who worked in the family business are listed in the official registers of London's Goldsmiths' Hall.

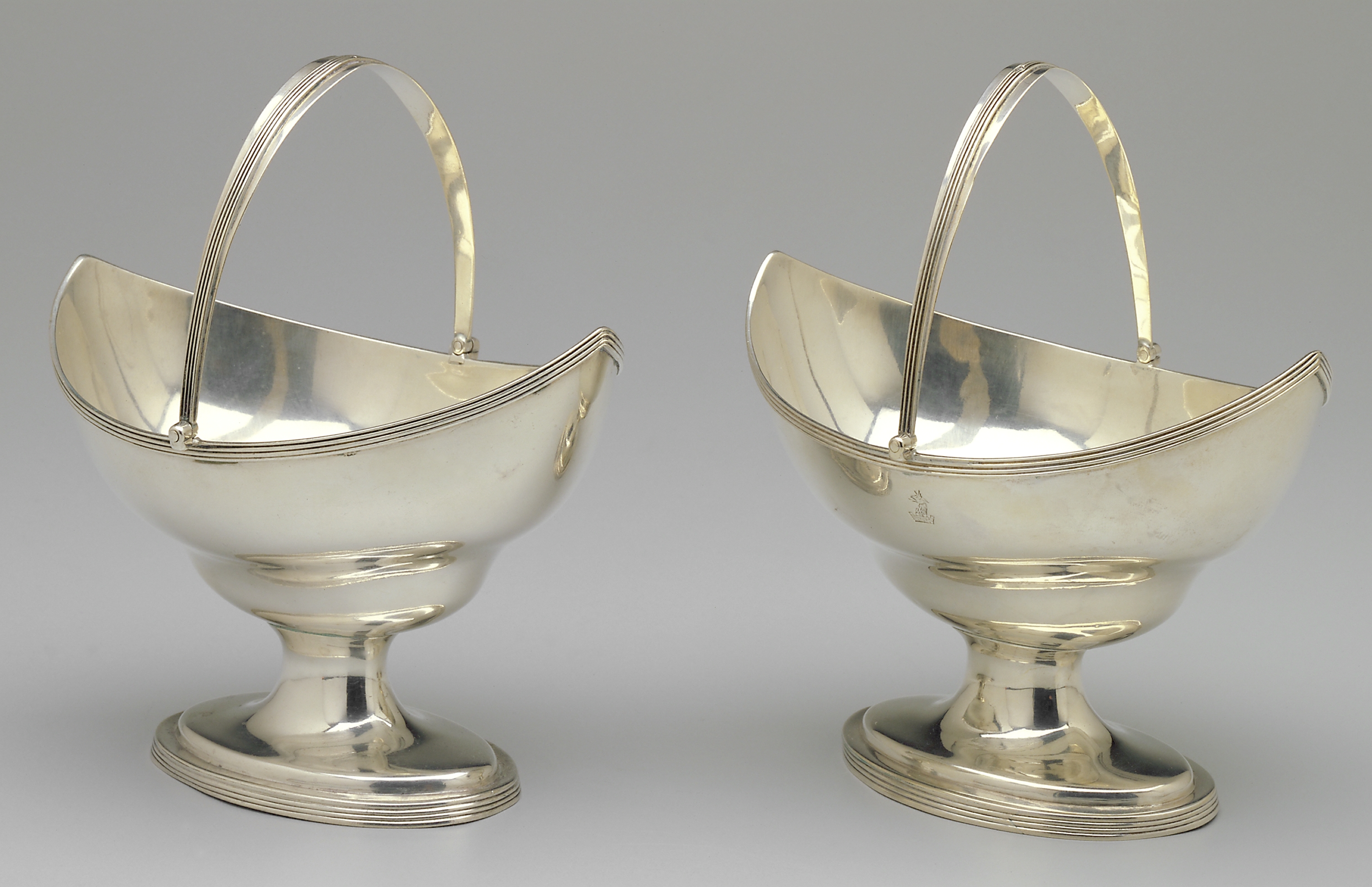
Sugar Baskets, 1794, by Ann and Peter Bateman

Three sugar baskets, designed for sugar or sweetmeats, by Ann and Peter Bateman in the collection of the Minneapolis Institute of Art attest to the fashion for lavish displays at the table (sugar being newly available from the Caribbean colonies). Their work is characterized by fine engraving and delicate beaded edges.
