= Destutt de Tracy =

Destutt de Tracy is the name and title of the Destutt family, counts of Tracy. It may refer to:

- Antoine Destutt de Tracy (1754–1836), a French Enlightenment aristocrat and philosopher
- Victor Destutt de Tracy (1781–1864), a French soldier and politician who served as Minister of Navy and Colonies in the French Second Republic
