= Robert Bateman =

Robert Bateman may refer to:

== People ==
- Robert Bateman (artist) (1842–1922), English painter, sculptor, naturalist, and scholar
- Robert Bateman (MP) (1560–1644), English merchant and politician
- Robert Bateman (painter) (born 1930), Canadian wildlife artist and naturalist
- Robert James Bateman (1860–1912), American pastor who died on the RMS Titanic
- Robert Bateman (songwriter) (1936–2016), American musician and songwriter

== Schools ==
- Robert Bateman High School (est. 2005), Burlington, Ontario, Canada
- Robert Bateman Secondary School (est. 1993), Abbotsford, British Columbia, Canada
