= Ada Sudeley =

British author

Ada Hanbury-Tracy, Baroness Sudeley
- Born: Ada Maria Katherine Tollemache; 21 June 1848; Ham House, Ham, Surrey
- Died: 6 January 1928 (aged 79); Petersham, Surrey
- Spouse: Charles Hanbury-Tracy (m. 1868; died 1922)
- Father: Frederick Tollemache

Ada Maria Katherine Hanbury-Tracy, Baroness Sudeley (née Tollemache; 21 June 1848 – 6 January 1928) was a British author.

== Life ==
She was born in 1848 at Ham House, the only daughter of Isabella Anne Forbes and Hon. Frederick Tollemache. Her uncle was Lionel Tollemache, 8th Earl of Dysart.

In 1868, she married Charles Hanbury-Tracy, 4th Baron Sudeley in the Chapel at Ham House. He served in the House of Lords and was a fellow of the Royal Society.

In 1890, she published her book Ham House, Belonging to the Earl of Dysart.

Her husband was bankrupt by 1893 and they had to sell Toddington Manor. Her husband died in 1922 and their eldest son William inherited the title. She died in 1928.
