= Edward Bateman =

English cricketer

Edward Louis Bateman CB (15 September 1834 – 25 January 1909) was an English first-class cricketer active 1854–65 who played for Nottinghamshire and Oxford University.

Bateman was born in Mickleover, Derbyshire on 15 September 1834 and was educated at Marlborough College and University College, Oxford. In 1866 he was called to the bar at the Inner Temple and became assistant secretary to the Ecclesiastical Commissioners. Bateman retired in June 1897 and was made a Companion of the Order of the Bath for his service. Bateman died on 25 January 1909 at his home in Derby, Derbyshire.
