= Ira Coleman Batman =

American politician

Ira Coleman Batman (January 20, 1862 – April 10, 1934) was an American jurist and politician. He was a member of the Indiana state legislature and was a judge of the Indiana Appellate Court from 1916 to 1924. The historic Batman House in Bloomington, Indiana was built for him circa 1890.

== Biography ==
Born in Lawrence County, Indiana, Batman taught school and then went to Indiana University. He then practiced law in Bloomington, Indiana and was the city attorney. He then served in the Indiana House of Representatives, in 1904, and was a Republican. From 1917 to 1925, he served on the Indiana Appellate Court. He died in Bloomington, Indiana.
