= Sudeley Hanbury-Tracy, 3rd Baron Sudeley =

British colliery owner and peer (1837–1877)

Sudeley Charles George Hanbury-Tracy, 3rd Baron Sudeley (9 April 1837 – 28 April 1877), styled The Honourable Sudeley Hanbury-Tracy between 1858 and 1863, was a British colliery owner.

Hanbury-Tracy was the son of Thomas Hanbury-Tracy, 2nd Baron Sudeley, and Emma Elizabeth Alicia Pennant, daughter of George Hay Dawkins-Pennant. He succeeded his father in the barony in February 1863, aged 25. He also succeeded his father as Lord-Lieutenant of Montgomeryshire, a post he held until his death.

Lord Sudeley died unmarried in April 1877, aged 40, and was succeeded in the barony by his younger brother, Charles, who became a prominent Liberal politician.

Honorary titles
Preceded by The Lord Sudeley	Lord Lieutenant of Montgomeryshire; 1863–1877	Succeeded by The Earl of Powis
Peerage of the United Kingdom
Preceded by Thomas Hanbury-Tracy	Baron Sudeley; 1863–1877	Succeeded by Charles Hanbury-Tracy
