= Batman v. Commissioner =

United States Court case

- Court: United States Court of Appeals for the Fifth Circuit
- Full case name: Ray L. Batman and Edith G. Batman v. Commissioner of Internal Revenue
- Decided: May 22, 1951
- Citation: 189 F.2d 107 (5th Cir. 1951)

Case history
- Prior history: Judgement for respondent, 9 TCM (CCH) 210 (1950)
- Subsequent history: Petition for rehearing denied, August 7, 1951; cert denied, 342 U.S. 877 (1951)

Holding
- Partnership was not formed between petitioner and minor son since all activities that formed it were initiated by petitioner, not son, and record did not suggest any involvement by son in creating partnership, therefore farm income from both years in dispute is taxed as individual income. United States Tax Court affirmed.

Court membership
- Judges sitting: Joseph Chappell Hutcheson, Jr., Wayne G. Borah and Robert Lee Russell

Case opinions
- Majority: Hutcheson

Laws applied
- Internal Revenue Code

Keywords
- Partnership taxation

Batman v. Commissioner, 189 F.2d 107 (5th Cir. 1951), is a 1951 decision of the United States Court of Appeals for the Fifth Circuit in the area of partnership taxation. It concerned a bid by a Texas Panhandle farmer to convert his farm into a family partnership by transferring some of its assets to his teenaged son. A three-judge panel unanimously affirmed the decision of the United States Tax Court that disallowed this.

The Tax Court judge had not found that any of the actions taken to convert the farm into a partnership between father and son were the result of a genuine desire by the young man to be his father's partner. Although he had been doing a fair share of the farm's work, it seemed his father had taken all the steps to make him a partner, against the advice of his banker. The sole reason for the action was found to be a desire by the petitioner to reduce his individual tax liability.

Joseph Chappell Hutcheson, Jr., then the circuit's chief judge, wrote for the panel in affirming the Tax Court's holding, although he also left intact some of the refunds it had granted. In a later case, the Tax Court found that a family partnership was formed for some subsequent tax years. While it has not been cited in many later tax cases, its unintentionally humorous title, suggesting a lawsuit between Batman and Commissioner Gordon from the DC Comics franchise, has earned it some notoriety in legal circles.

== Underlying dispute ==
After spending his teen years working in wheat fields around the country, Ray Batman settled down on his own farm near Perryton, Texas, in 1923. His wife Edith bore a daughter and a son. By 1942 he had done well enough to purchase some of the land he had been renting. Three years later he farmed and ranched 200 head of cattle on over 6,500 acres (2,600 ha) of land near Perryton and in nearby Harper County, Kansas.

Batman was impressed by his son, Gerald, who worked hard on the farm on his school vacations and expressed interest in becoming a farmer himself. In either late 1943 or early 1944, he approached his accountant about making Gerald a partner in the farm, even though his son was only 14 at the time. The accountant tried to dissuade him from doing so, saying that the Treasury Department did not have a favorable view of such partnerships among family members, seeing them as a potential tax dodge.

Over the next two years he distributed some of the farm's assets and profits to Gerald, per an oral agreement he claimed the two had made. He and his wife filed their tax returns reflecting this. The Internal Revenue Service (IRS), however, did not consider the partnership between Ray and Gerald to have been legitimately formed and assessed both the Batmans almost $10,000 each in extra income tax for the years 1944 and 1945.

== Litigation ==
The Batmans filed an appeal of the IRS's determination in United States Tax Court. It was not heard there until 1950. Judge Eugene Black issued a memorandum opinion in March upholding the IRS.

While he agreed that some of the facts on the record supported Batman's assertions, he could not find that the partnership between father and son had been formed at the initiative of both parties. "The question of whether the partnership here in question is to be recognized for income tax purposes depends upon whether the parties, in good faith and acting with a business purpose, intended to join together as partners in the present conduct of the enterprise," he wrote, citing the Supreme Court's decision in Commissioner v. Culbertson, which had involved a similar division of a family-owned ranch among sons. "It seems to us," he continued,

... that when petitioner's testimony (Gerald did not testify) concerning this alleged partnership is boiled down it amounts to about this: Petitioner decided to take Gerald, who was then about 14 years of age, in as a partner and undertook to do it without saying much to Gerald about it. In other words, it does not seem to us to have been an arm's length transaction between petitioner and Gerald but was more or less a unilateral transaction in which petitioner played the principal part and Gerald's part was passive.

Ray Batman claimed that his son was a silent partner, but Black could not find anything in the record which supported that. Since everything else suggested that the older man had continued to run the farm by himself as before, he agreed with the IRS that no partnership existed. He did, however, allow some of the deductions that the agency had denied Batman for those years.

The Batmans appealed the decision to the Fifth Circuit Court of Appeals. They claimed the Tax Court had given too much weight to their son's infancy, Ray Batman's status as head of the farm and Gerald's being the silent partner. A three-judge panel composed of Joseph Chappell Hutcheson, Jr., Wayne G. Borah and Robert Lee Russell took the case and rendered a decision over a year later, in 1951. Unanimously, they agreed with Black.

After briefly reviewing the parties' arguments, Hutcheson stated unequivocally that the court agreed with the IRS. "But for the partnership label affixed to it by the father, the inventor, creator, and deus ex machina of the plan for increasing his family's net earnings by decreasing the taxes accruing on them, no one would have any difficulty in seeing the arrangement for what it is, another attempt of the earner of the income to have his cake and eat it too, vicariously, indeed, for the present through his son." He likened it to the scheme before the Supreme Court two decades earlier in Lucas v. Earl, where the justices had disallowed a man's attempt to avoid taxes on half his income through a contract with his wife.

Hutcheson went on to lament the difficulty courts had in seeing through the obfuscatory use of the term "partnership" in these cases:

The confidence with which the taxpayer argues his case, the apparent difficulties attending the pointing out of its weaknesses, all proceed from the simple fact that sometimes, because of its very obviousness, it is difficult to see clearly a fact which, once seen, looms so large and is so unmistakable that the wonder is it was not seen, and its significance understood, long before.

This is just another of those cases, however, common in the law, as in other matters, where, having given a name to a set of facts, consequences are attributed to the name or label, as used, which are entirely foreign to the subject matter labeled ... If courts and judges were a little wiser, or not quite so wise; if we could see, as we should see, face to face, or, though not as through a glass darkly, not quite so clearly as we sometimes erroneously think we see; if we fully understood semasiology and the uses and abuses of words; we should be as little troubled, should have as little difficulty, in piercing through the name "partnership" to the facts in family partnership cases ... If knowing, or using, a little less of technical legal reasoning, we knew and used a little more of common sense; if, as the child, in the story of the Emperor's Garment, saw through the pretense to the fact, that the Emperor in reality had no garment on; if, in short, we could see this case, as it really is, we could easily see that what is presented as a partnership here is really not one at all. It is merely an arrangement for shoring up and expanding the family fortunes at the expense of the tax collector.

That August, the Batmans' petition to the Fifth circuit for a rehearing was denied. Later that year the Supreme Court denied their petition for certiorari, ending the case.

== Subsequent proceedings ==
The Batmans challenged a later IRS finding, relying on the first case, that no partnership had existed in the years 1946 and 1947 either. Again the Batmans challenged it in court. The case went again to the Fifth Circuit, which in 1956 ruled in their favor.

Hutcheson, who again wrote for the panel, distinguished the two cases by one factor: Gerald's testimony. "Twenty-five years old on this trial and still an active partner with his father, eleven years after the beginning of their association, he was the chief witness," the judge wrote. "His testimony, including cross-examination, occupied thirty-six pages of the record. Clear, direct, positive, and convincing, it fully supported the partnership claim for 1946 and 1947 ... Taking it over all, it presents a clear picture of a true farming partnership of father and son, entered into as a part of a plan, earlier evidenced in the gifts of land and cattle to the son for making his son a successful farmer."
