= Ben Bateman =

English footballer

Personal information
- Full name: Benjamin John Bateman
- Date of birth: 20 November 1892
- Place of birth: Chelsea, England
- Date of death: 24 March 1961
- Height: 5 ft 10 in (1.78 m)
- Position: Outside right

Youth career
- 1912–1913: Sutton Court

Senior career*
Years	Team	Apps	(Gls)
1913–1924	Crystal Palace	172	(10)
1924–?	Dartford		

International career
1913–1914	England Amateurs	4	(0)
- * Club domestic league appearances and goals

Benjamin John Bateman (20 November 1892 – 1961) was an English professional footballer who played as an outside right. He made 172 appearances in the Football League and Southern League for Crystal Palace scoring 10 goals. He also played non-league football for Dartford.

== Playing career ==
Bateman, was born in Chelsea, Greater London and was originally a schoolteacher by profession. He began his youth career at Sutton Court, an amateur club based in Middlesex, England and signed for Crystal Palace (then playing in the Southern League) in the close season of 1913. In season 1913–14, Bateman became an England amateur international, playing on a tour to Scandinavia. However, his career was then interrupted by service as a sergeant in the London Regiment during World War I, but he returned to play for the club thereafter. Bateman made 74 appearances in the Southern League, scoring four goals.

In 1920, Crystal Palace became a founder member of the Third Division and Bateman made the transition to professional football. He became a regular in the side that won the inaugural Third Division title in 1920–21, making 32 appearances but without scoring. After one season in division two, Bateman's appearances became less frequent over the subsequent two seasons and he moved on to Dartford in August 1924. He had made 99 Football League appearances (6 goals) for Crystal Palace.

Ben Bateman died in 1961, aged 68.
