= Alan Mara Bateman =

Alan Mara Bateman (6 January 1889 – 11 May 1971) was an economic geologist who worked on mining in North America and a professor at Yale University who also served as a long-standing editor of the journal Economic Geology. He also wrote several textbooks on mining including the Formation of Mineral Deposits.

== Life ==
=== Early life ===
Bateman was born to Elizabeth Janet Mara Bateman and George Bateman in Kingston, Ontario, he was one of four children. He grew up with an interest in outdoor skills and played football and soccer at Queens University

=== Education ===
Bateman graduated from Queen's University at Kingston in 1910 with a degree in mining engineering and geology. He then joined Yale University and studied under John D. Irving, L.V. Pirsson, Edward S. Dana and William E. Ford. He worked with the geological survey of Canada in 1911 in British Columbia. He received a PhD from Yale in 1913 with a thesis on geology and ore deposits of the Bridge River district, British Columbia.

=== Career ===
Bateman worked on mining related work in Alaska at the Kennecott Mines. In 1915 he became an instructor at Yale University teaching economic geology with John Irving who died in 1918 during war service which left the editorship of the journal Economic Geology to Bateman. Bateman was promoted from instructor to assistant professor of geology in 1916. Bateman then became an associate professor in 1922. Bateman wrote a textbook Economic Mineral Deposits first published in 1942, with a second edition in 1950 which was translated into several languages and a third in 1981.

Bateman worked for Kennecott from 1916 to 1942. During this time, Bateman worked in Rhodesia, Morocco, Tunisia, apartheid-era South Africa, the Belgian Congo, Spain, and Kenya. In addition to this, he performed consultancy work in Peru, Chile, Argentina, and Peru, alongside involvement as a reviewer for mining operations in China, the USSR, Japan, and India. In 1941, Connecticut governor Hurley named Bateman to an eight-person committee of researchers tasked with studying Connecticut's mineral resources.

In 1949 at an event in San Francisco, Bateman commented that United States foreign policy necessitated attention to the supply and security of mineral wealth; Bateman remarked that "I think we have to face clearly the fact that we are approaching a crisis in our mineral situation," and added that "it is inevitable that more and more the United States will have to depend upon foreign sources and minerals."

Bateman was a founding and key member in the establishment of the Society of Economic Geologists in 1920, and served in an active role on society committees. Bateman was chairman of the society's first committee on publications. Bateman was elected to the American Academy of Arts and Sciences in 1941.

=== Personal life ===
He married Grace Hotchkiss Street of New Haven in 1916. Bateman died at home in New Haven.

== Selected publications ==
- Bateman, A.M., 1914, Lillooet Map area, British Columbia, Canadian Geological Survey Summary Report, Pages 188-210.
- Bateman, A.M., 1932, Notes on a Kennecott type of copper deposit — Glacier Creek, Alaska: Economic Geology, Volume 27, Pages 297-306.
- Bateman, A. M., 1942a, Economic Mineral Deposits, 1st Edition: New York, John Wiley and Sons, Inc. 855 pages.
- Bateman, A.M., 1942b, The ore deposits of Kennecott, Alaska, in, Newhouse, W.H., editor, Ore deposits as Related to Structural Features: Princeton University Press, pages 188-193.
- Bateman, A.M., 1946, Wartime dependence on foreign minerals: Economic Geology, Volume 41, pages 308-327.
- Bateman, A. M., 1950, The Formation of Mineral Deposits, 2nd Edition: New York, John Wiley and Sons, Inc. 916 pages.
- Bateman, A.M., 1951, The formation of late magmatic oxide deposits: Economic Geology, Volume 46, pages 404-426.
- Bateman, A.M., and McLaughlin, D.H., 1920, Geology of the ore deposits at Kennecott, Alaska: Economic Geology, Volume 15, pages 1-80.
- Bateman, A.M., and Lasky, S.G., 1932, Covellite-chalcocite solid solution and exsolution: Economic Geology, volume 27, pages 52-86.
