= Nick Bateman =

Nick or Nicholas Bateman may refer to:

- Nick Bateman (television personality) (born 1967), English television personality
- Nick Bateman (model) (born 1986), Canadian model and actor
