= Hester Bateman =

English silversmith (1708-1794)

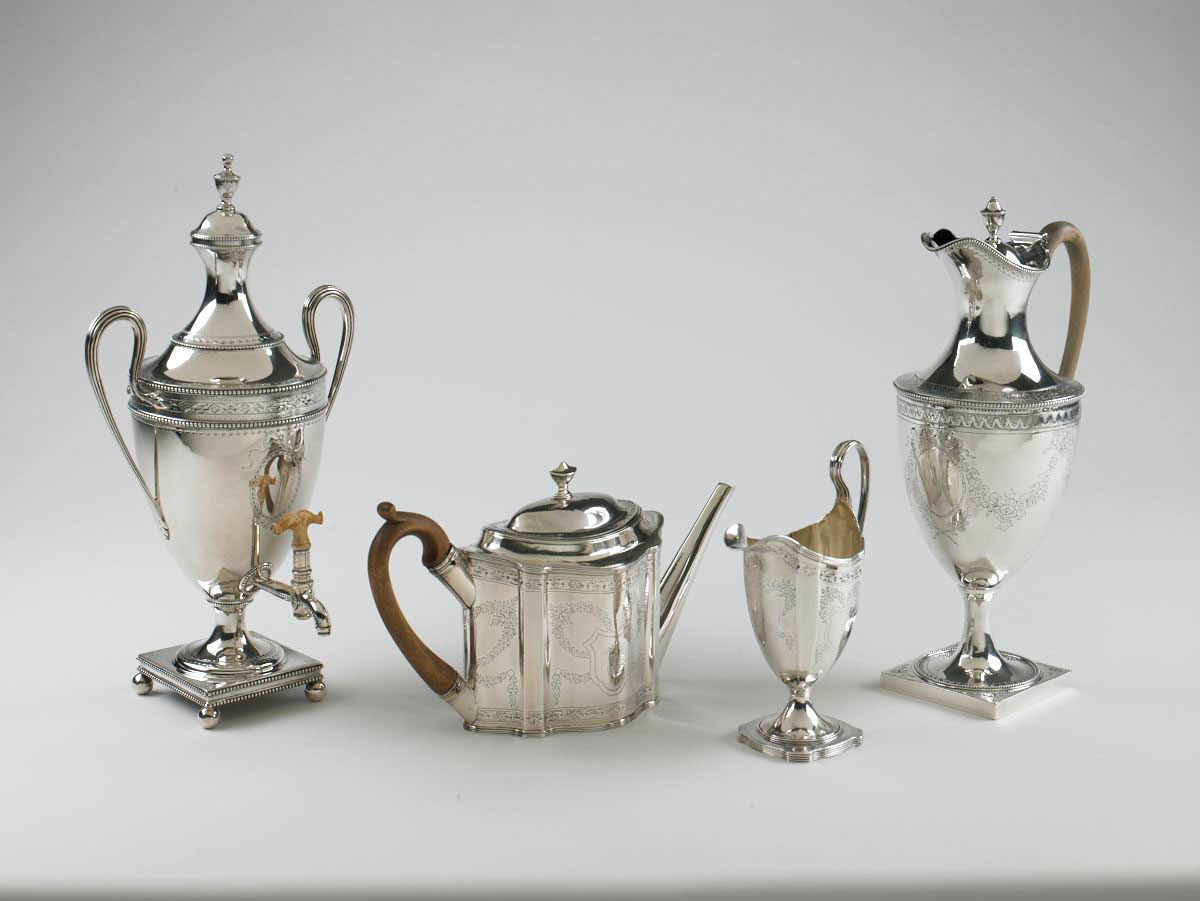
- Examples of the Bateman family's work at the Birmingham Museum of Art
- Born: Hester Nedem (or Needham); 1708
- Died: 16 September 1794 (aged 85–86); London, England
- Resting place: St. Luke's, Old Street, London
- Known for: Silversmith
- Spouse: John Bateman (m. 1732; died 1760)
- Children: John Joseph (Joss) Bateman; Letitia Bateman (Richard) Clarke; Ann Bateman (Dick) Cockerill; Peter Bateman (1740-1825); William Bateman; Jonathan Bateman (1747-1791)

Hester Bateman (bap. 1708 – 16 September 1794) was an English silversmith, renowned for her high quality flatware and ornamental silverware. A craftswoman working within the family business, she was succeeded in turn by her sons, daughter-in-law, grandson and great-grandson. The Bateman family silversmithing company lasted until the middle of the nineteenth century.

== Biography ==
Hester Neden or Needham was baptised in London on 7 October 1708, the daughter of John Neden or Needham. On 20 May 1732 she married a gold chain maker and wire drawer called John Bateman. During their marriage, she gave birth to six children: John Joseph (Joss), Letitia, Ann, Peter, William and Jonathan. John Bateman died of consumption (tuberculosis) in 1760, leaving his tools to his wife in his will. She took over the family business and registered her own first sponsor's mark at the Goldsmith's Hall in 1761, simply "HB" in script.

From the time up to the late 1770s, not much Bateman work is known, possibly because she was supplying pieces for other silversmiths that were subsequently overstamped with their marks. Female traders were not uncommon at the time in luxury trades such as working with precious metals, and Bateman had female contemporaries such as Elizabeth Godfrey.

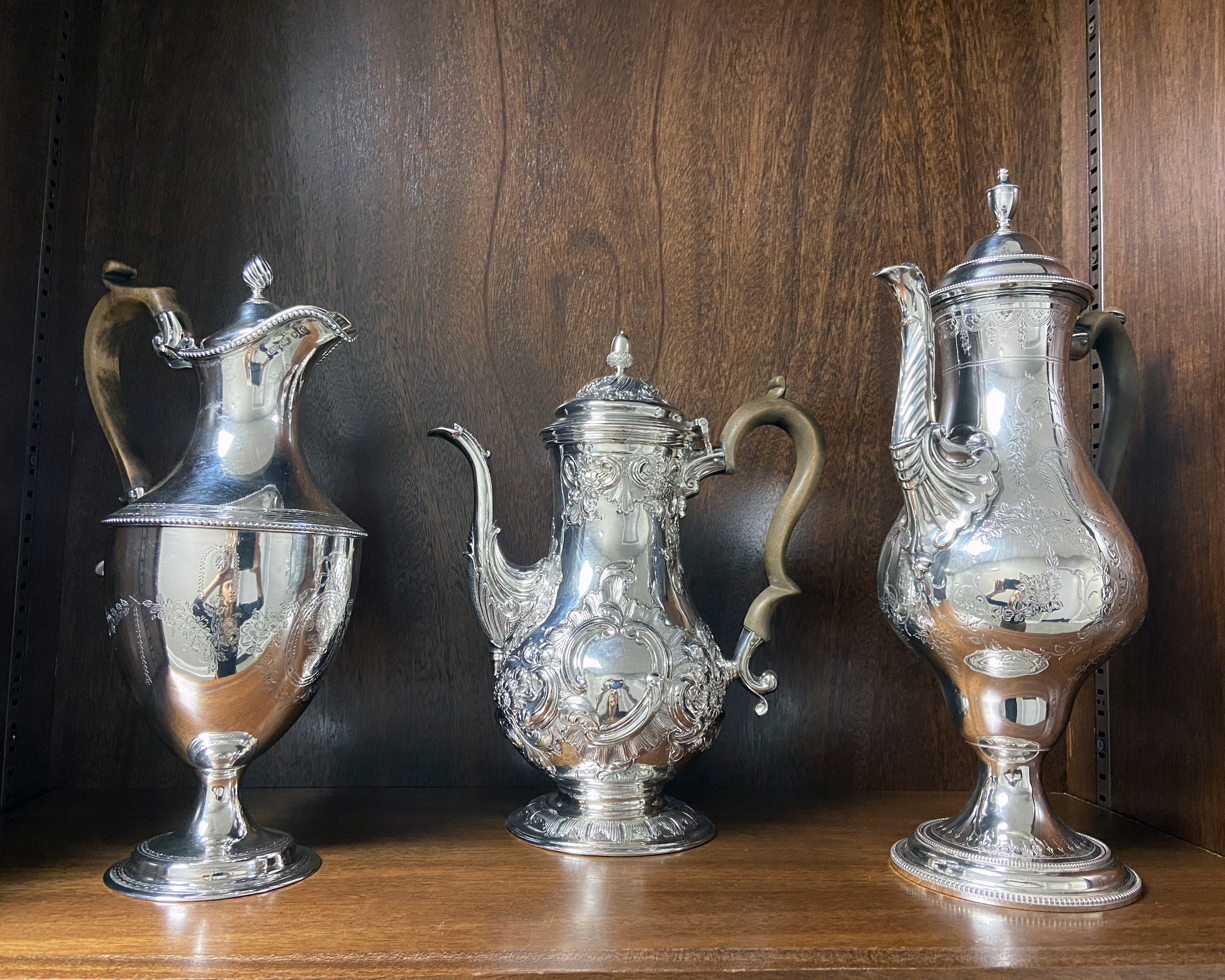
Silver Coffee Pots and Ewer by Hester Bateman

After about 1774, Hester Bateman worked to build up the business at 107 Bunhill Row, London with her sons Jonathan (1747-1791) and Peter (1740-1825). They used the latest technology to produce their silverware as cheaply as possible and compete with other companies using Sheffield Plate. They used thin gauge sheet silver and machines to punch and pierce it. The family specialised in household silverware in a neo classical style, and she expanded their range to include many goods such as tea caddies, jugs, salvers, salt cellars, wine labels, trays and ink wells. Their work is characterised by bright-cut engraving, beading around edges and piercing.

Hester Bateman retired in 1790 and was succeeded by her sons. Her daughter Letitia, by now Letitia Clarke, ran her own business as a goldsmith and jeweller from the same year, listed in directories of the time as a premises at the Eagle and Pearl, 9 Holborn-bars. Hester Bateman died on 16 September 1794 at her home at 107 Bunhill Row and was buried at St Luke's, Old Street, London.

== Legacy ==
The business that Hester Bateman had built up and run for thirty years was taken over by her sons Peter and Jonathan. They registered a hallmark with their initials ("PB" over "IB") in December 1790, but Jonathan died in April 1791. Jonathan's widow Ann-Olympe (Dowling) (1748–1813) entered a hallmark with her brother-in-law Peter ("PB" over "AB") and worked for the company until 1805. Peter Bateman retired in 1815 and passed the company to his nephew William (1774–1850), son of Jonathan and Ann Bateman. His son, also called William Bateman, took over in 1839 until 1843 when the Bateman family company closed. Bateman silverware continues to be popular, and Hester Bateman is considered one of the finest English silversmiths.

Silver by Hester Bateman is in the Rosenbach Museum.
