= Ray Bateman Jr. =

American luger (1955–1990)

Personal information
- Nationality: American
- Born: August 9, 1955 Somerville, New Jersey, United States
- Died: February 1, 1990 (aged 34) Bridgewater, New Jersey, United States

Sport
- Sport: Luge

Ray Bateman Jr. (August 9, 1955 – February 1, 1990) was an American luger. He competed at the 1980 Winter Olympics and the 1984 Winter Olympics. He died at the age of 34, after collapsing playing a game of squash.
