= Edgar Bateman =

Edgar Bateman may refer to:

- Edgar Bateman (drummer) (1929–2010), American jazz drummer
- Edgar Bateman (lyricist) (1860–1946), English lyricist of music hall songs
