= Toddington Manor, Gloucestershire =

Toddington Manor
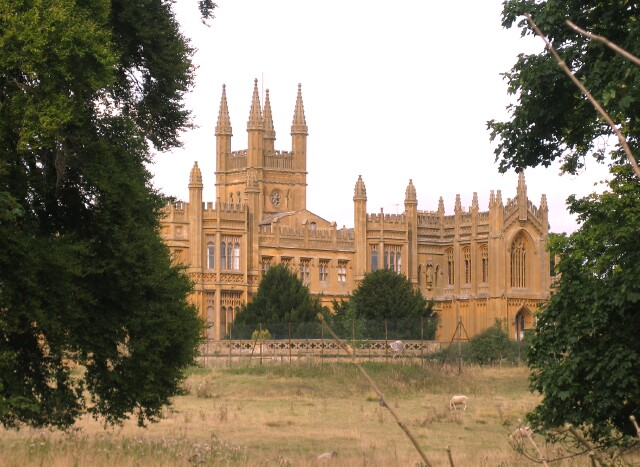
- Toddington Manor

- Location in Gloucestershire
- 51°59′52.58″N 01°56′53.02″W
- Location: Toddington, Gloucestershire, England

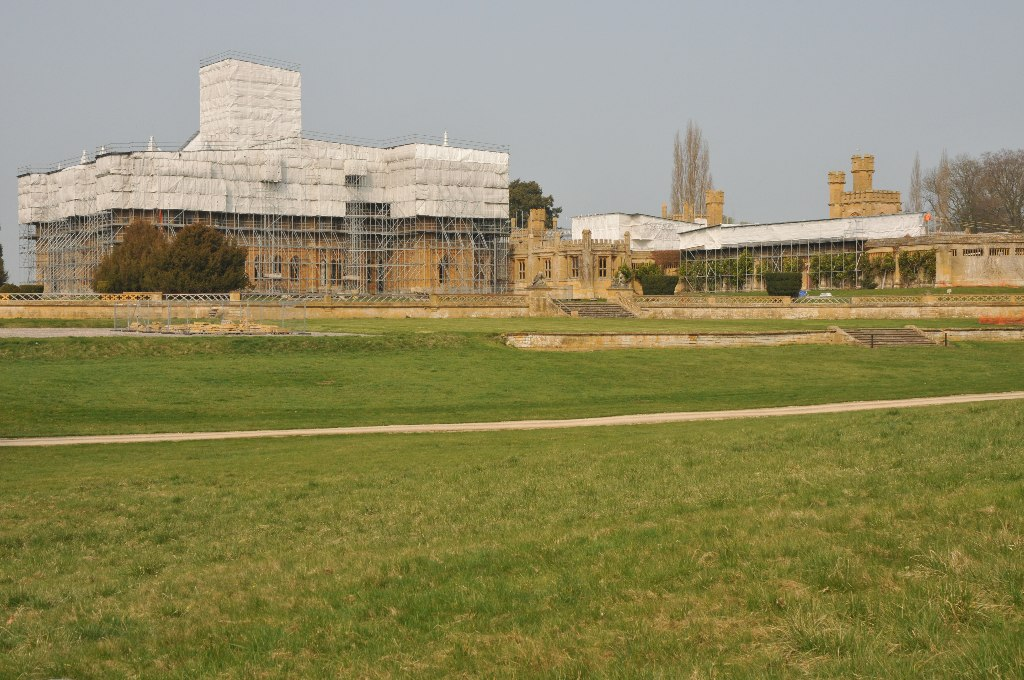
Toddington Manor clad in sheeting from 2006 to 2022

Toddington Manor is a 19th-century country house in the English county of Gloucestershire, near the village of Toddington. It is in the gothic style and was designed by Charles Hanbury-Tracy, 1st Baron Sudeley for himself and built between 1819 and 1840. Upon its completion, a volume on its architecture was published by John Britton (antiquary). It is a Grade I listed building.

Hanbury-Tracy was a gentleman-architect who was influenced by the work of John Carter of the Society of Antiquaries. As one of the earliest Gothic Revival houses, the building shaped the course of British architectural history in an indirect way: when the Houses of Parliament were to be rebuilt after the fire in 1834, Hanbury-Tracy headed the jury to the competition, and the architect of the winning design, Charles Barry, obviously adapted his entry to the taste exemplified in Toddington. The family owned the house until 1893 when Charles Hanbury-Tracy, 4th Baron Sudeley, and his writer wife Ada had to sell due to bankruptcy.

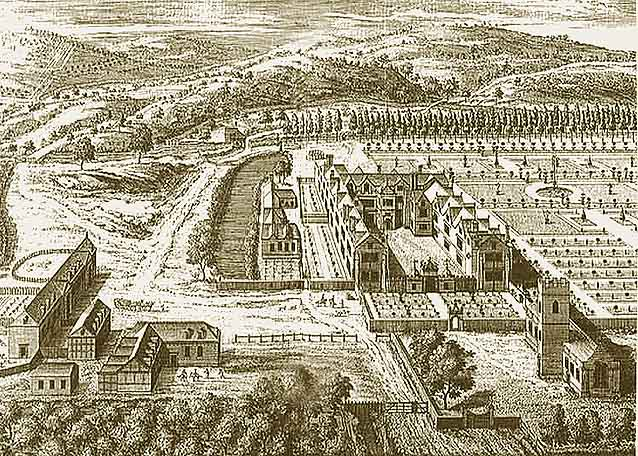
Toddington Manor by Jan Kip, 1709, showing the remnant of its moat, its parish church and half-timbered outbuildings contrasting with its fine, brand-new formal garden

The last private owner, Isabel Andrews, whose husband had bought the estate in 1901, died in 1935 and it stood empty until September 1939, when it was purchased by the National Union of Teachers, who had moved out of London to avoid air raids. The NUT staff both lived and worked in the building. Following Dunkirk a tented encampment was erected in the grounds and temporarily occupied by men evacuated from the beaches. They were later followed by units of the British Army.

In 1942 the Pioneer Corps built a more permanent hutted encampment, which was occupied by units of the United States Army from October 1942. In August 1943 the NUT moved back to London and the US Army took over the house as well. After the war the Congregation of Christian Brothers rented the property and in 1948 the NUT sold it to them.

During the Second World War the house was used by the National Union of Teachers and as quarters for American servicemen. From 1948 to 1971 it was run as a teacher training college by the Irish Congregation of Christian Brothers, and was severely damaged by fire in 1965.

In 1972 the manor was bought by the businessman David Wickens, who used it as a private residence and carried out an extensive renovation. A fire broke out at the house in November 1974 while Wickens was inside; he escaped, and the damage was estimated at £50,000.

In late 1975 Wickens sold the manor for £230,000 to Mohammad Ali Kaveh, an Iranian who had worked as a journalist for the Tehran newspaper ‘Kayhan’. Kaveh converted the house into a boarding school for overseas students, Toddington Manor College, which opened in 1976.

In 1979 Kaveh sold the college to an international charitable educational foundation for more than £500,000, and moved his school to the former Abbey School site at Malvern, Worcestershire, where it continued as Abbey College, Malvern. The new owners reopened Toddington in 1980 as Avicenna College, a boarding school for boys from Arab and Iranian families, directed by Mehrdad Khonsari, a former press attaché at the Iranian embassy in London. Annual fees were about £5,000. The college closed abruptly in early 1985, its remaining students transferred to other schools and its staff dismissed, the foundation stating that it was not paying its way.

In 2004, following the school's closure, planning permission to convert it into a hotel was denied after the scheme had attracted considerable local opposition.

In 2005 it was purchased by the artist Damien Hirst who planned to restore it and use it as a family home and a gallery, both his own works and for his collection of works by other artists. Since 2006, Toddington Manor has been encased in what Hirst claims is the world's biggest span of scaffolding. As at 2025, the manor remains encased in scaffolding and sheeting, restoration work having stalled for over 20 years. The manor is listed on Historic England’s Heritage at Risk Register.
