= Jim Tracy (ski) =

American skiing coach

- Born: Mammoth Lakes, California
- Occupation: Skiing coach
- Years active: 1976-present

Jim Tracy is an American skiing coach. Born in Mammoth Lakes, California, Tracy started skiing at the age of 10. He was head coach of the U.S. women's Ski team from 2008 to 2010, coaching them at the 2010 Winter Olympics. After the 2010 Winter Olympics, Tracy stepped down from his position as coach without giving a reason, in spite of the team's successful performance at the games.
