= Henry Leigh Tracy, 8th Viscount Tracy =

English peer (1732–1797)

The Viscount Tracy
- Born: Henry Leigh Tracy; 25 January 1732
- Died: 29 April 1797 (aged 65)

Henry Leigh Tracy (1732–1797) was the 8th and last Viscount Tracy of Rathcoole, County Dublin.

== Early life and education ==
Born 25 January 1732, he was educated at John Roysse's Free School in Abingdon (now Abingdon School).

== Career ==
He was an Army officer, a Lieutenant in the 7th Regiment of Foot (Royal Fusiliers) 1757 and Captain of the 98th Regiment of Foot 1760–63.

== Peerage ==
He was married on 12 December 1767 to Susannah Weaver and had one daughter but no sons. He succeeded his brother John Tracy, 7th Viscount Tracy, to the Peerage of Ireland title Viscount Tracy in 1793. On his death in 1797, the title became extinct and he was buried at Toddington, Gloucestershire.

Peerage of Ireland
Preceded by John Tracy	Viscount Tracy; 1793–1797	Extinct

== See also ==
- List of Old Abingdonians
