= James Tracy (activist) =

American author and activist (born 1970)

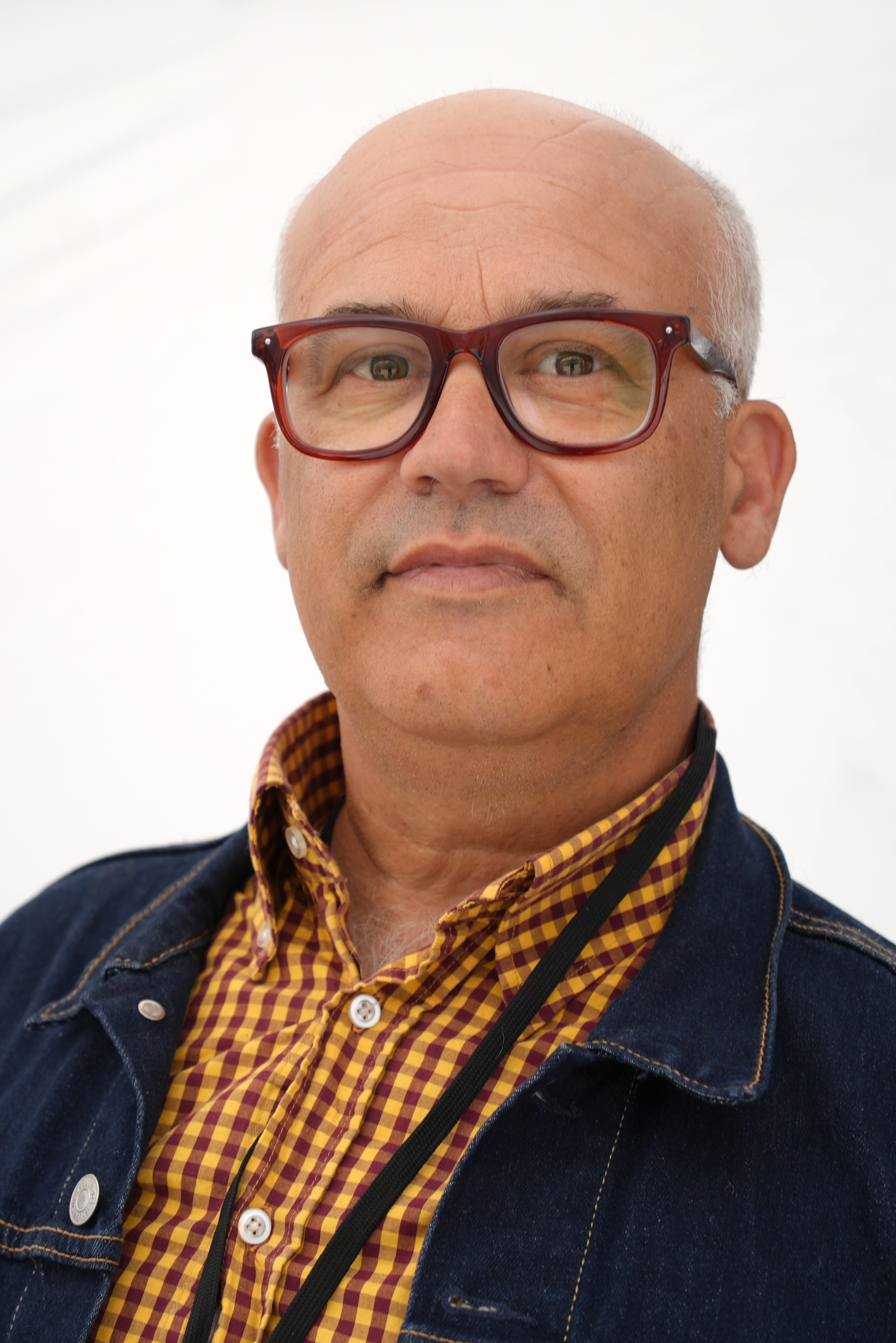
- Tracy in 2025
- Born: 1970 (age 55–56); Oakland, California
- Citizenship: American
- Education: New College of California (BA) Empire State College, SUNY (MA)
- Website: jamesrtracybooks.org

James Richard Tracy (born 1970) is an American author, poet and activist living in Oakland, California. He is the co-author (with Amy Sonnie) of Hillbilly Nationalists, Urban Race Rebels and Black Power: Community Organizing in Radical Times (Melville House Publishers 2012).

== Early life ==
Tracy was born in Oakland, California in 1970. His family moved shortly thereafter to Vallejo, California. His father was a kindergarten teacher in the Richmond Unified School District. His mother worked a variety of jobs in the social work field. Tracy has two younger brothers.

Tracy credits several formative events in shaping his early political outlook. His first job was as a paper delivery person for the Vallejo Independent Press, a worker-owned newspaper founded by striking newspaper workers. This introduced the idea of worker self-management to him. In early 1989, the presence of Neo-Nazi organizers in Vallejo helped him form an anti-racist commitment.

== Housing organizing ==
In 1992, Tracy co-founded the Eviction Defense Network (EDN) an organization which utilized direct action to prevent evictions. The EDN was invited to work alongside public housing residents organizing for the right-of-return in the federal HOPE VI program. Subsequently, he was a member of the Coalition On Homelessness, Mission Agenda, and the Mission Anti-Displacement Coalition.

== Teaching ==
In 2023, Tracy was lecturing at San Francisco State University. Tracy is the Chair of the Labor and Community Studies Department at City College of San Francisco.

== Published work ==
- The Civil Disobedience Handbook: A Brief History and Practical Guide for the Politically Disenchanted (Manic D Press, 2001)
- Molotov Mouths Outspoken Word Troupe: Explosive New Writing (Manic D Press, 2003)
- The Military Draft Handbook: A Brief History and Practical Guide for the Curious and Confused (Manic D Press, 2005)
- Sparks and Codes (Civil Defense Poetry, 2007)
- Avanti Popolo: Italian Americans Sail Beyond Columbus (co-editor) (Manic D Press, 2008)
- Hillbilly Nationalists, Urban Race Rebels and Black Power: Community Organizing in Radical Times (Melville House Publishers, 2012)
- Dispatches Against Displacement: Field Notes From San Francisco's Housing Wars (AK Press, 2014)
- No Fascist USA!: The John Brown Anti-Klan Committee and Lessons for Today’s Movements (co-authored with Hilary Moore) (City Lights Publishers, 2020)

=== Anthologies and encyclopedia entries ===
- “Henry David Thoreau,” Encyclopedia of Activism and Social Justice, New York University Press, February 2007.
- “Housing Movements,” Encyclopedia of Activism and Social Justice, New York University Press, February 2007.
- “Young Patriots Organization,” Encyclopedia of Activism and Social Justice, New York University Press, February 2007.
- “A Decade of Displacement,” The Political Edge, City Lights Publishers, 2009.
- “Rising Up: Poor, White and Angry in the New Left”, The Hidden 1970s: Histories of Radicalism, Rutgers University Press, 2010.
