= Charles Hanbury-Tracy, 4th Baron Sudeley =

British politician and peer (1840–1922)

The Right Honourable The Lord Sudeley PC FRS
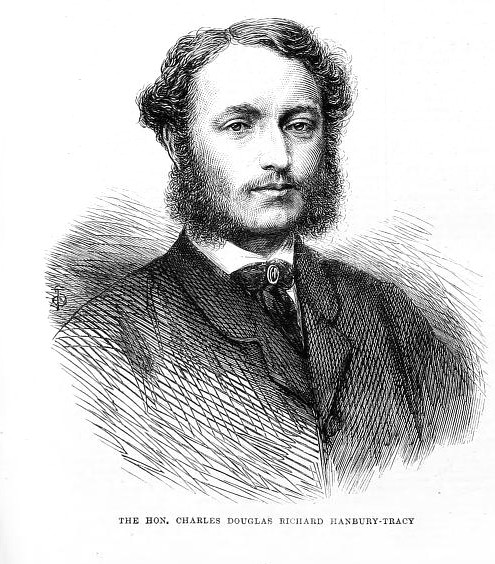

Captain of the Honourable Corps of Gentlemen-at-Arms
- In office 10 February 1886 – 20 July 1886
- Monarch: Victoria
- Prime Minister: William Ewart Gladstone
- Preceded by: The Earl of Coventry
- Succeeded by: The Viscount Barrington

Personal details
- Born: 3 July 1840
- Died: 9 December 1922 (aged 82)
- Party: Liberal
- Spouse: Ada Maria Katherine Tollemache (m. 1868)
- Parents: Thomas Hanbury-Tracy (father); Emma Eliza Alicia Dawkins-Pennant (mother)

Charles Douglas Richard Hanbury-Tracy, 4th Baron Sudeley PC FRS (3 July 1840 – 9 December 1922), styled The Honourable Charles Hanbury-Tracy from 1858 to 1877, was a British Liberal politician. He served as Captain of the Honourable Corps of Gentlemen-at-Arms under William Ewart Gladstone in 1886.

== Background ==
Sudeley was a younger son of Thomas Hanbury-Tracy, 2nd Baron Sudeley, and his wife Emma Eliza Alicia Dawkins-Pennant, daughter of George Hay Dawkins-Pennant, of Penrhyn Castle.

== Political career ==
Sudeley entered the House of Commons for Montgomery in 1863, a seat he held until 1877 when he succeeded in the barony on the death of his elder brother. He served under William Ewart Gladstone as a Lord-in-waiting (government whip in the House of Lords) from 1880 to 1885 and as Captain of the Honourable Corps of Gentlemen-at-Arms from February to July 1886. The latter year Sudeley was also sworn of the Privy Council. Apart from his political career he was a Fellow of the Royal Society. He later came into financial difficulties and was declared bankrupt in 1893. This caused the sale of the family seat of Toddington Manor.

== Family ==
Lord Sudeley married the writer Ada Maria Katherine Tollemache, daughter of the Honourable Frederick James Tollemache, in 1868. He died in December 1922, aged 82, at Reston Lodge, Petersham and was succeeded in the barony by his eldest son, William.

== Arms ==
Coat of arms of Charles Hanbury-Tracy, 4th Baron Sudeley
Crest "1st, on a chapeau gules, turned up ermine, an escallop sable, between two wings or; 2nd, out of a mural coronet sable, a demi-lion rampant or, holding in the paws a battle-axe sable, helved gold." Escutcheon "Quarterly: 1st and 4th or, an escallop in the chief point sable, between two bendlets gules" (Tracy); "2nd and 3rd or, a bend engrailed vert plain cotised sable" (Hanbury). Supporters "On either side a falcon, wings elevated proper, beaked and belled or." Motto Memoria Pii Æterna "The pious are held in everlasting remembrance" Badge "A fire beacon, and in front thereof and chained thereto a panther ducally gorged, the tail nowed."

Parliament of the United Kingdom
Preceded by John Willes-Johnson	Member of Parliament for Montgomery; 1863–1877	Succeeded by Frederick Hanbury-Tracy
Political offices
Preceded by The Earl of Coventry	Captain of the Honourable Corps of Gentlemen-at-Arms; 1886	Succeeded by The Viscount Barrington
Peerage of the United Kingdom
Preceded by Sudeley Charles George Hanbury-Tracy	Baron Sudeley; 1877–1922	Succeeded by William Charles Frederick Hanbury-Tracy
