= Bateman =

Bateman may refer to:

== Places ==
- Bateman, Western Australia, a suburb of Perth, Australia
  - Electoral district of Bateman, an electorate of the Western Australian Legislative Assembly, centred on the suburb
- Batemans Bay, a town and bay in New South Wales, Australia
- Bateman, Saskatchewan, Canada
- Bateman, Wisconsin, United States

== Other uses ==
- Bateman (surname)
- Bateman, pen name of author and journalist Colin Bateman
- Bateman's, the home of Rudyard Kipling in Burwash, East Sussex, England
- Bateman Manuscript Project
- Bateman's principle, in evolutionary biology
- Batemans Brewery, Lincolnshire
