= Toddington, Gloucestershire =

Village in Gloucestershire, England

Coordinates: 51°59′34″N 01°56′57″W

Toddington
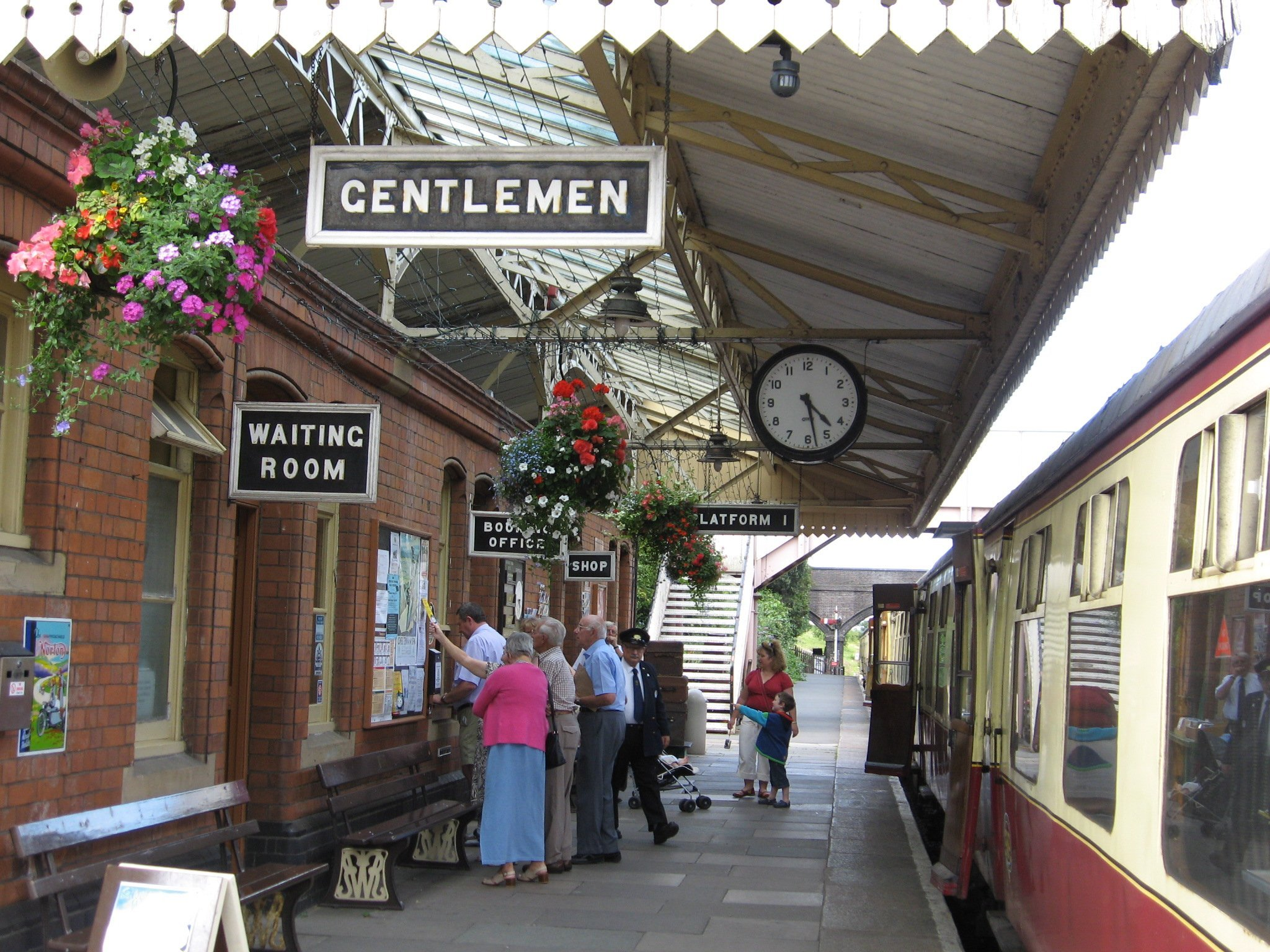
- Toddington railway station on the Gloucestershire Warwickshire Steam Railway line.

- Location within Gloucestershire
- Population: 419 (2011 Census)
- District: Tewkesbury
- Shire county: Gloucestershire
- Region: South West
- Country: England
- Sovereign state: United Kingdom
- Post town: Cheltenham
- Postcode district: GL54
- Police: Gloucestershire
- Fire: Gloucestershire
- Ambulance: South Western
- UK Parliament: Tewkesbury

Toddington is a village and civil parish in north Gloucestershire in Tewkesbury Borough, located approximately 12 miles (19 km) north-east of Cheltenham with a population of 419 at the 2011 census.

The village is split into two, the "Old Town" near the church and the "New Town" at the crossing of the B4077 and B4632 roads. The village pub, The Pheasant, is situated at the heart of the village, next to the village shop.

== Parish church ==
Despite the size of the village, it has a large church, St Andrew's which contains the marble tombs of local nobility, the Tracy family, who variously lived at Sudeley Castle, Hailes Abbey and Toddington Manor.

== Toddington Manor ==
Toddington Manor lies between New Town and Old Town and was bought by the Turner Prize-winning artist Damien Hirst in 2005 with plans to turn the manor into a museum of his work.

3 The Square, Toddington, is a residential conversion of the old stable block of the Manor House. It dates back to c. 1800 and was possibly built by C. Beazley for Charles Hanbury-Tracy.

== Railways ==
Toddington railway station is located in New Town on the Gloucestershire Warwickshire Steam Railway heritage line, which runs between Broadway and Cheltenham Racecourse.

Also located in the village is the narrow gauge Toddington Narrow Gauge Railway, which is also known by its pre-2018 name, the North Gloucestershire Railway.

== See also ==
- Taddington, Gloucestershire
- Teddington, Gloucestershire
