= Williams-Wynn =

Williams-Wynn is a surname. It may refer to:

- Charles Williams-Wynn (1775–1850), Secretary at War, second son of the 4th Baronet
- Charles Williams-Wynn (1822–1896), his son
- Sir Henry Williams-Wynn (1783–1856), diplomat, third son of the 4th Baronet
- Sir Herbert Williams-Wynn, 7th Baronet (1860–1944), nephew and son-in-law of the 6th Baronet
- Sir Watkin Williams-Wynn, 3rd Baronet (1692–1749)
- Sir Watkin Williams-Wynn, 4th Baronet (1749–1789)
- Sir Watkin Williams-Wynn, 5th Baronet (1772–1840)
- Sir Watkin Williams-Wynn, 6th Baronet (1820–1885)
- Sir Watkin Williams-Wynn, 8th Baronet (1891–1949)
- Sir Watkin Williams-Wynn, 9th Baronet (1862–1951), cousin of the 8th Baronet
- Sir Watkin Williams-Wynn, 10th Baronet (1904–1988)
- Sir Watkin Williams-Wynn, 11th Baronet (born 1940)

== See also ==
- Wynn-Williams
