= 9th (Welsh) Battalion, Imperial Yeomanry =

- Active: January 1900–1902
- Country: United Kingdom
- Branch: Imperial Yeomanry
- Role: Mounted infantry
- Size: 1 Battalion
- Part of: Imperial Yeomanry
- Engagements: Jericho; Rhenoster Nek; Springhaan's Nek; Wonderfontein; Tafel Kop; Battle of Hart's River; Battle of Rooiwal

The 9th (Welsh) Battalion, Imperial Yeomanry was a unit of the British Imperial Yeomanry (IY) raised for service in the Second Boer War. Equipped as Mounted infantry, (Note: As mounted infantry the IY units were designated 'companies and 'battalions rather than 'squadrons and 'regiments' as in the Yeomanry Cavalry.) the battalion served in South Africa from April 1900 until the end of the war. Its companies took part in numerous anti-guerrilla 'drives' with mobile columns that eventually brought the war to an end.

== Imperial Yeomanry ==
Following a string of defeats during Black Week in early December 1899, the British government realised that it would need more troops than just the regular army to fight the Second Boer War, particularly mounted troops. On 13 December, the War Office decided to allow volunteer forces to serve in the field, and a Royal Warrant was issued on 24 December that officially created the Imperial Yeomanry (IY). The Royal Warrant asked the established part-time Yeomanry regiments to provide service companies of approximately 115 men each for one year. In addition, many men who could ride (initially these were mainly mid- to upper-class) volunteered to join the new force.

== Organisation ==
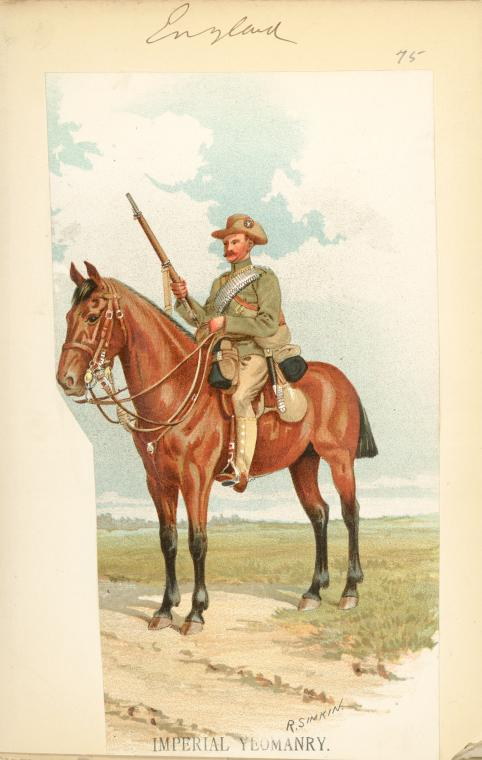
An Imperial Yeomanry trooper

The three Welsh Yeomanry regiments raised four companies for the IY, which constituted the 9th (Welsh) Battalion under the command of Colonel Henry Howard, commanding officer of the Denbighshire Hussars:

- 29th (Denbighshire) Company – sponsored by the Denbighshire Hussars
- 30th (Pembrokeshire) Company – sponsored by the Pembroke Yeomanry
- 31st (Montgomeryshire) Company – sponsored by the Montgomeryshire Yeomanry
- 49th (Montgomeryshire) Company – sponsored by the Montgomeryshire Yeomanry

The two Montgomeryshire companies mobilised at Welshpool on 4 January 1900 and began training at Welshpool and Newtown respectively. For advanced training the two companies moved to Wynnstay, the country estate of Sir Watkin Williams-Wynn, 7th Baronet, the Montgomeryshire Yeomanry's commanding officer, whose younger brother Captain Robert Williams-Wynn commanded the 31st Company. They were joined by a section of two Colt machine-guns on 'galloping carriages' that had been provided by public subscription. The 29th Company sailed first for Cape Town and arrived on 5 March. The other three companies embarked on the Elder Dempster Lines' SS Montrose at Liverpool on 13 March and landed on 8 April.

== Service ==
At Cape Town the three companies went to a remount camp at Maitland until 24 April, and then began a long rail journey with other IY units, reaching Bloemfontein on 12 May. On 16 May they joined a column tasked with clearing the Boers out of the district between Abraham's Kraal and Boshof. On 23 May the column returned with its prisoners to Bloemfontein. From now on the companies were detached on separate duty, and 9th Bn was not re-assembled until February 1901.

=== White's Column ===
On 24 May 1900 the 31st Company moved south-east to Dewetsdorp, where the Orange River Colony (ORC) was proclaimed. It remained there until 8 August, when it moved to rendezvous with the 30th Company, and they trekked via Thabanchu back to Bloemfontein. On 18 August the two companies joined up with the 29th Company in Lieutenant-Colonel White's Flying Column, which also included two field guns of 38th Battery, Royal Artillery, and two infantry companies from the Royal Irish Rifles. The column moved by train to Ventersburg West, then marched to Ventersburg where there were contacts between the scouts and Haasbroek's Commando, leading to some casualties. The column then entrained again for Winburg where patrols were sent out to find Olivier's Commando but there were no contacts as the column scoured the veldt back to Bloemfontein. At Bloemfontein on 1 September the column was attached to Major-General Bruce Hamilton's brigade for a 70 miles (110 km) march to relieve a garrison of the Royal Wiltshire Yeomanry besieged at Ladybrand by Fourie's Commando. After this was accomplished the column (reinforced by the Royal Wiltshires and a detachment of the 16th Lancers) accompanied Lieutenant-General Sir Archibald Hunter's column in a sweep over the veldt to Brandfort and then into the Doornberg uplands. During the trek some members of the Pembroke Company were ambushed and captured, but released to make their way on foot to Ladysmith. From 23 September Major Wentworth Forbes (31st Company) was in command of the three Welsh IY companies in the column.

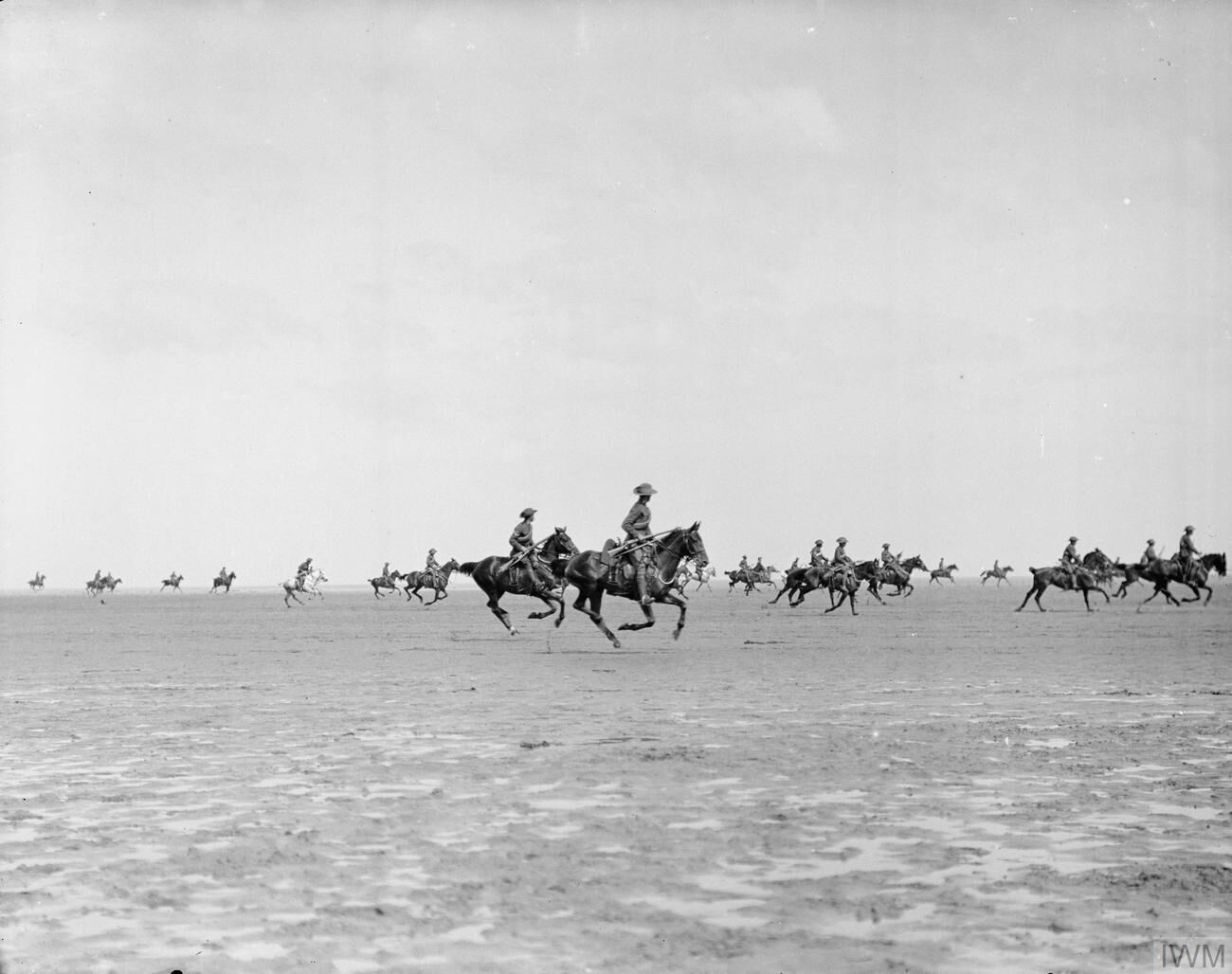
Imperial Yeomanry galloping over a plain during the Second Boer War.

From mid-September White's Column was active in the Bethulie district, organising town defences and provisioning British garrisons. On 6 October the column's yeomanry played a prominent part in the relief of Philippolis and later engaged Haasbroek's and De Wet's commandos in a sharp action at Aasvogel Kop and Quagga Laaghte. On 8 December the column arrived at Smithfield after a forced march from Bethulie; the Welsh Yeomanry companies now totalled 185 fit and mounted men. Here White linked up with Maj-Gen Charles Knox's Column to drive the scattered Boers northwards into a planned encirclement (the 'Second de Wet Hunt'). From 11 to 14 December the column maintained contact with De Wet's rearguard, but De Wet then used Haasbroek's Commando to draw off the pursuers while he broke through the trap at Springhaan's Nek. The Welsh Yeomanry companies and 16th Lancers charged home, using their rifles as clubs against Haasbroek's men and causing considerable casualties, but De Wet and the main body got away. The pursuit continued across north-east ORC to Winburg and Heilbron. White's Column was withdrawn on 21 January 1901 and returned to Bloemfontein, then went by rail back to Bethulie to rejoin Hamilton's brigade in a further drive. On 9 February 1901 the column, with 29th, 30th, 31st Companies, IY, reached Silk Spruit.

=== Rundle's Column ===
Meanwhile, the 49th Company and MG Section had been left at Bloemfontein, suffering several casualties from Enteric fever before marching out on 29 May 1900 to join Lt-Gen Sir Leslie Rundle's Column at Senekal. In July an operation involving several columns to drive the Boers out of the eastern ORC and prevent them infiltrating south saw the 49th Company active in the Senekal, Winburg, Trommel and Witteberg districts. The operation succeeded in capturing Marthinus Prinsloo and about 4000 Boers, but De Wet and his men got away, leading to a series of 'De Wet Hunts' (see above).

=== Hickman's Column ===
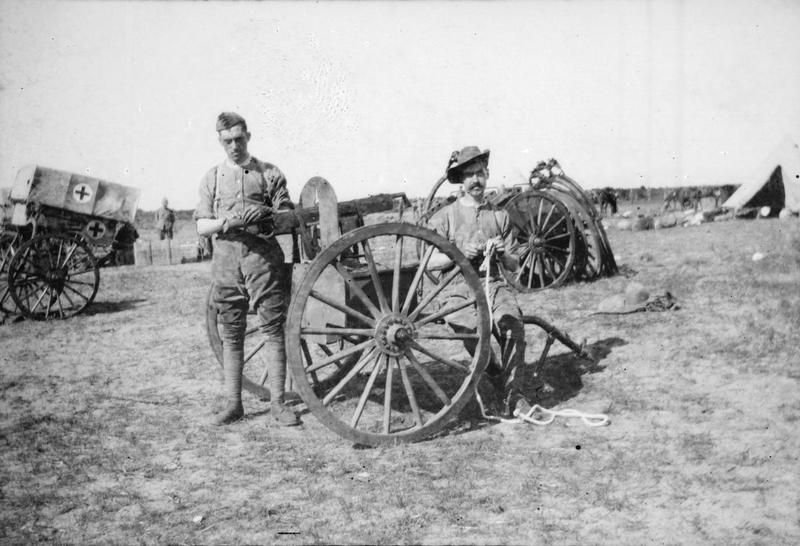
Colt machine-gun on a 'galloping carriage' during the Boer War.

In early August the 49th Company went by train from Winburg to Pretoria where with other IY companies and the MG section they were formed into a Provisional Battalion under the command of Col Howard. On 16 August this battalion, together with a squadron of Tasmanian Mounted Infantry, became the mounted arm of Col Hickman's Flying Column operating under Maj-Gen Arthur Paget's division. The yeomen were soon in action, clashing with the Boers at Dredepoort, Onderstepoort and Haman's Kraal between 17 and 20 August, 49th Company suffering a number of casualties. From Haman's Kraal Hickman's Column took part in the pursuit of De Wet north of Pretoria, with clashes at Pienaar's River, Warm Baths and Nylstroom, and 49th Company engaged in a sharp fight at Buiskop. During September the column was in almost constant action, protecting Lord Roberts' flank as he marched on Lydenburg. Later the column operated along the Pretoria to Pietersburg railway.

There was a perception that the war was almost over and future operations would be of a police nature. Lord Roberts handed over command to Lord Kitchener. On 2 October 49th Company was ordered back to Pretoria to begin the journey home, but this was quickly countermanded. Depleted by sickness and transfers to the British South African Constabulary (BSAC), the company continued in service with Hickman's Column. During October and November it operated in western Transvaal, including Hickman's successful raid on Jericho. On 29 November Paget made a frontal attack on Ben Viljoen's force at Rhenoster Nek with his infantry while swinging his mounted troops round the Boers' right flank. Hickman's column of yeomanry and Queensland Mounted Infantry came up on the flank of the infantry but was held in check. Although the attack was ultimately successful, casualties were heavy and the Boers got away. The column then moved by forced marches to Hebron to take part in operations against Koos de la Rey. On 29 December 49th Company was sent back to Elandsfontein, near Johannesburg, to rest and refit. On 2 February 1901 it entrained for Bethulie and then joined the 29th, 30th and 31st Companies at Silk Spruit to unite the 9th (Welsh) Battalion for the first time.

=== Great de Wet Hunt ===
During early February 1901 De Wet broke back through the British lines and invaded Cape Colony, sparking off the 'Great de Wet Hunt'. On 10 February White's Column including most of 9th (Welsh) Bn moved through Bethulie to the Orange River, where the mounted men swam their horses across, and pursued the Boers non-stop. By 3 March the men were on half rations and their clothes were in tatters, but De Wet had retreated back across the river, losing his guns and waggons. The column continued through Aliwal North sweeping up stragglers as far as the Basutoland border, then returned to the ORC. At different times, detachments of 9th (Welsh) Bn also served with columns under Maj-Gen John Maxwell (29th and 49th Companies) and Lt-Col G.E. Benson. The battalion was concentrated at Edenburg in May.

== Second Contingent ==
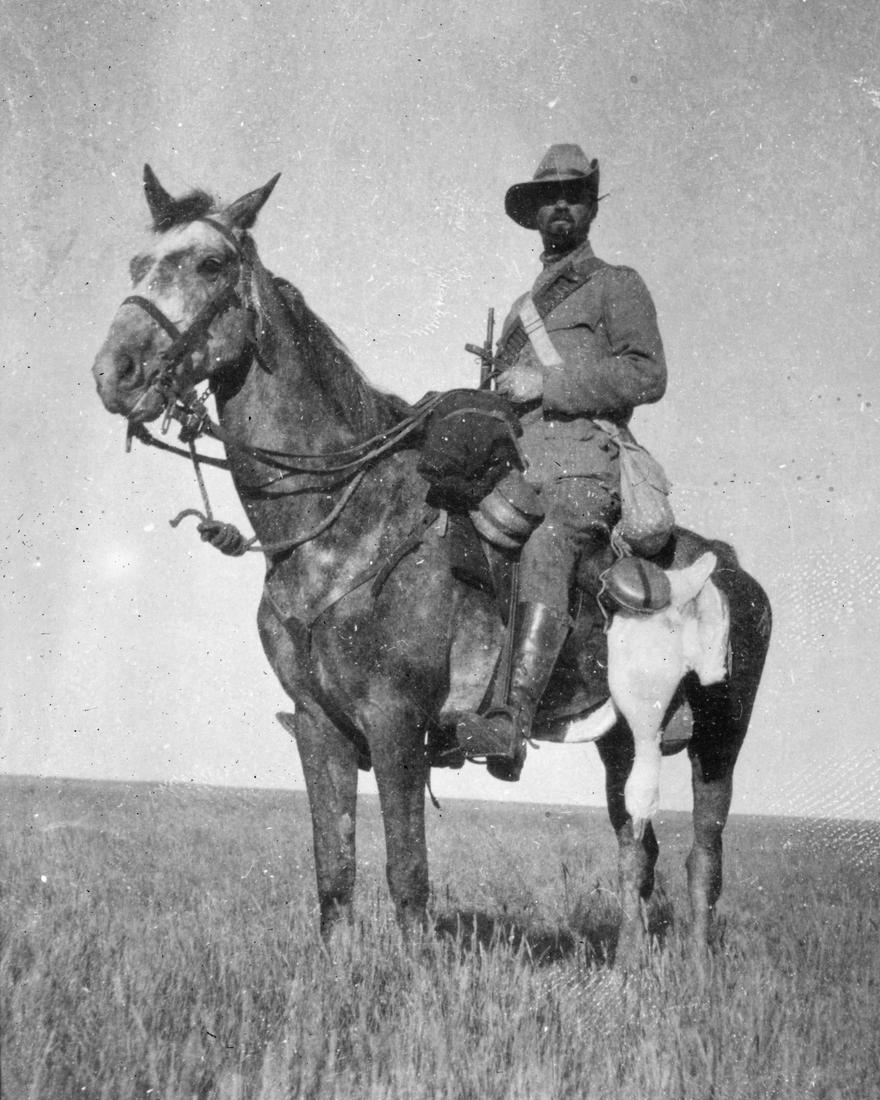
Imperial yeoman on the Veldt.

The men of the first IY contingent were now free to return home after their one-year term of service, a Second Contingent having arrived from home to replace them. Where enough veterans volunteered to extend their service, existing companies in South Africa were reinforced by relief companies from home, but many new Second Contingent companies were raised directly by the War Office, bypassing the Yeomanry regiments, and the recruits were often of poor quality. The new 88th (Welsh Yeomanry) and 89th (Montgomeryshire) Companies were exceptional in being formed and trained by the Montgomeryshire Yeomanry at Wynnstay at the same time as the relief companies for the 31st and 49th (Montgomery) Companies (sometimes referred to as the 'New' 31st and 49th, or '2/31st' and '2/49th'). The Second Contingent of the IY landed in South Africa by the end of April 1901. On 23 May the original 29th and 49th Companies set off for Cape Town, followed by the 30th and 31st on 1 June.

The relief companies were not destined to serve together as 9th Bn, but were sent off in pairs to join various columns. 29th and 49th Companies remained with White's Column and saw action at Macabe's Nek on 3 June when the column attempted to relieve Jamestown. The two companies were transferred on 26 June to Col Rochfort's Column operating under Bruce Hamilton in the southern ORC. The 30th and 31st Companies were placed with Maxwell's Column in central and eastern Transvaal. After sweeping backwards and forwards between Aliwal North and the blockhouse line that he been established across the veldt the two Welsh companies were transferred to Maj Frederick Damant's Column. The two new companies, 88th and 89th, were under Lt-Gen Lord Methuen in western Transvaal.

=== Rochfort's Column ===
As part of a major new British drive beginning in July 1901, Hamilton positioned Rochfort's Column, including 302 yeomen under 9th Bn, as one of a cordon of mobile detachments behind the line of BSAC posts from Wegdraai Drift on the Riet River to Emmaus. While other columns drove the Boers towards this stop line, Hamilton's columns also harried and raided. Once this operation was concluded, Rochfort's Column was almost continually on the move for the rest of the year, over difficult country and on short rations. In November and December the column pursued Brand's, Ackermann's and Loetzee's Commandos, capturing 170 prisoners. In January 1902 it pursued Mainboult's Commando in the area between Bloemfontein and Kimberley. From 27 January, as part of a larger force, the column began a month-long sweep from Bloemfontein to Winburg and then on to Heilbron, which netted over 800 Boers and 2000 horses as well as livestock, weapons and waggons.

=== Damant's Column ===
Damant's Column consisted of his own 'Damant's Tigers' (formerly Rimington's Guides) together with the 30th and 31st Companies IY under Capt Campbell, and two field guns. On the nights of 29/20 and 30/31 July the column without waggons and living off the country made rapid night marches, then lay up during daylight, to surround Fauresmith before dawn. Unfortunately the Boers had just left, and after a morning pursuit the column just failed to catch J. B. M. Hertzog and his bodyguard. On 1 August Damant left Fauresmith with 50 men to signal across to Maj Boyle Smith's distant column. Coming across a small party of Boers Damant charged, only to find it to be a large force of round 500 Boers. Damant drove back one of the commandos, and skirmishing continued until reinforcements arrived from Fauresmith with a pom-pom gun; the force then drove the Boers out of their position and they fled. The column moved to block the Riet River at Kalabash Drift on 7 August but ran into the Jacobsdal Commando hidden in the kopjes. The yeomanry charged them out of this position and the column captured a number of waggons with Boer families. There was continuous skirmishing over the following days. In August 1901 several Boer commandos were reported moving through the ORC to invade Cape Colony again. Knox positioned his columns across this line of advance and was strengthened by Damant's Column from Hamilton's force. On 23 August Damant's Column attacked a detachment of De La Rey's Commando near Smithfield and drove them into the Mersfontein hills where they scattered.

In October 1901 the British began extending the blockhouse line to the foothills of the Drakensberg. Damant and Wilson's columns were assigned to protect this work, backed by the ciolumns of Lt-Col 'Mike' Rimington and Col Sir Henry Rawlinson. During the second week of October Damant made a night march against a concentration of Boers on the Vaal River near Villiersdorp, but the Boers escaped with the loss of some casualties. On 15 October the column attacked 500 Boers near Blaauwkranz, forcing them back to Roodeval where they broke up in disorder in the face of a second attack, losing livestock, waggons and prisoners. In December the column was part of a sweep between Frankfort and Reitz aimed at forcing the Boers back against the blockhouse line, which succeeded in capturing more waggons and horses, and a few prisoners. Damant's and Rimington's columns returned to Heilbron to rest and refit. They were ordered out again on 17 December to clear out Wessel Wessels' Commando, which was harassing the work on the blockhouse line. On 20 December, Damant and Rimington, after a difficult night march from Frankfort, were a little to the north of the Tafel Kop, a prominent hill with a commanding view over the Wilge River valley. Receiving a report of 300 Boers between the Tafel Kop and the Wilge, the two columns swept round the eastern end of the hill to drive them towards the river. Damant's Column (Damant's Horse, 30th, 31st and 91st Companies IY, a total of 550 rifles with two field guns of 30th Battry, RA, a Maxim gun and a pom-pom) advanced in a widely extended line along the Riet Spruit. Reaching a long flat-topped hill with a steep descent overlooking the river, Damant halted with his staff, escort, guns, and 91st Co to await Rimington. The rest of Damant's Horse were out on the flanks, with 30th and 31st Cos even further to the right. About a mile away they could see formed bodies of mounted troops in khaki, which they presumed were the yeomanry covering the blockhouse construction parties. Only when these got close did Damant's party realise they were Boers masquerading as yeomanry. The Boers galloped to reach the highest point of the hill, from where they commenced heavy fire on the HQ party and guns. The whole party was soon overrun: Damant was wounded and all his staff were disabled, most of the gunners were shot down while serving their guns, but the wounded artillery officer managed to get his gun teams away to Rimington's column. Without limbers the Boers could not move the captured guns, but they smashed the Maxim and pom-pom, and pillaged the dead and wounded (leading to allegations of War crimes). It was some time before the 30th and 31st Companies could be called in to join two squadrons of Damant's Horse in re-taking the hill; with Rimington's Column also approaching, the Boers did not stay to fight.

In January 1902 the 30th and 31st Companies continued protecting the blockhouse construction parties, the carried out more sweeps with Damant's and Rimington's columns, but in early March they joined a large concentration of forces at Klerksdorp (see below).

=== Methuen's Column ===
The 88th and 89th Companies arrived at Cape Town aboard SS Norman on 23 April 1901, and were sent by rail to Bulawayo in Rhodesia. Here Maj P.M. Sykes (2nd Dragoon Guards) took command of the two companies and on 13 July they set off to join Lord Methuen's Column at Mafeking in Transvaal. On this long march they had several clashes with Boers and suffered a few casualties. Methuen set out from Mafeking to sweep south-west Transvaal, searching the Marokani mountains for Boer arms and supply dumps. The column captured waggons, livestock and a few Boers. On 15 August a 400-strong Boer commando attacked the column's transport at Reitvlei and a there were a number of casualties among the Montgomeryshire yeomen before the Boers were driven off. In September Methuen's Column moved out from Klerksdorp to search for Jan Kemp's Commando. Kemp evaded the columns closing in on him, with the loss of his waggons, ammunition and dismounted men. Methuen pursued to Zeerust, capturing part of Van Tonder's Commando, but on 4 September found himself hemmed into the close country of the Marico River near Wonderfontein by De la Rey's large force. According to Amery 'Methuen and his Yeomanry, whom he had infected with his own spirit, were equal to the occasion. Forty men, chiefly of the Welsh companies, were killed or wounded in a fight which ... [was among] ... the severest as yet experienced by any of the new Yeomanry'. In their unsuccessful attempts to destroy the column, the Boers lost many of their own supply waggons in the skirmishing. Methuen had too few troops to hold down western Transvaal, but after returning to Mafekinghe reorganised his force to increase its effectiveness. On 14 September he created the '1st Divisional Scouts', a provisional regiment consisting of the 88th and 89th Companies, IY, the Bechuanaland Rifles, and the Mounted Infantry Company of the 4th (Hertfordshire Militia) Battalion, Bedfordshire Regiment, with pom-poms and Maxims, under the command of Maj B.W. Cowan of the Bechuanaland Rifles. The Scouts' role was to be the point and flank guards of the column. Methuen's next sweep beginning on 2 October aimed to prevent the Biers gathering the harvest and to cover the extension of the blockhouse line from Rustenburg to Mafeking. During October and November Methuen's other columns suffered setbacks, but his own saw little contact with the enemy. Sweeping towards Wolmaransstad in December Methuen surprised two Boer Laagers, taking numerous prisoners and waggons, but on 22 December his mounted screen was attacked by Jan Celliers near Lichtenburg and suffered heavy casualties. On 30 January 1902 the column was again in action against Celliers ear Knoppenfontein, but he withdrew before becoming heavily engaged.

== Third Contingent and the end of the war ==
The War Office began to raise a Third Contingent of the IY in September 1901, reverting to using the Yeomanry regiments at home for recruitment. However, few of the volunteers had any yeomanry experience. Reinforcement drafts were sent to South Africa to replace the time-expired men and casualties in the existing companies.

While there were moves to bring the Boer leaders to the negotiating table, Kitchener kept up the pressure. On 12 March 1902, 29th and 49th Companies left Rochfort's Column and went by rail to Klerksdorp to join a force under the Commander-in-Chief's brother, Maj-Gen Walter Kitchener. The 30th and 31st also came from Damant's Column. The four companies, totalling 300 men by now, were in Lowe's Column, but 30th and 31st also served with Col Cookson's neighbouring column. In all, 12 columns rode 40 miles (64 km) out of Klerksdorp on the night of 23 March, then formed a 90 miles (140 km) wide line and swept the veldt back towards the Klerksdorp–Ventersburg railway and blockhouse line. Although many Boers escaped through the cordon, the net was closing round them. On 31 March Cookson made contact with De la Rey's largest force: Kemp drove in Cookson's weak yeomanry outposts but they had bought time and he ran into a line of trenches and fortified farmhouses that Cookson had taken up at Boschbult (the Battle of Hart's River). British casualties were high but with Lowe's Column marching up in support, De la Rey called off what would have been a costly attack.

At the Battle of Rooiwal on 11 April, 88th and 89th Companies took part in the last largescale engagement of the war, when the Boers charged a superior force of British troops under Col Robert Kekewich. Only the wild shooting of the inexperienced yeomanry and other troops stopped it from being a massacre. Afterwards the British columns began a pursuit as the Boer force broke up. Next day the Boer and British negotiating teams met, and on 31 May the Treaty of Vereeniging was signed, ending the war.

On 5 June the 88th and 89th Companies returned to Klerksdorp and 9th (Welsh) Battalion was reunited. At the end of the war it was officially organised as:

- 29th (Denbighshire) Co
- 30th (Pembrokeshire) Co
- 31st and 49th (Montgomery) Cos
- 88th and 89th (Montgomery) Cos

The commanding officer's post was vacant and the battalion was under the second-in-command, Maj T.R. Mallock, DSO, of the Royal Fusiliers. Although two of the captains were from the Montgomeryshire Yeomanry, the others were from militia and volunteer infantry and artillery units. The battalion left Klerksdorp and moved by rail to Port Elizabeth on the first stage of the journey home. Embarking on the SS Braemar Castle it disembarked at Southampton on 27 August and was demobilised at Aldershot on 3 September.
