= Williams-Wynn baronets =

Title in the Baronetage of England

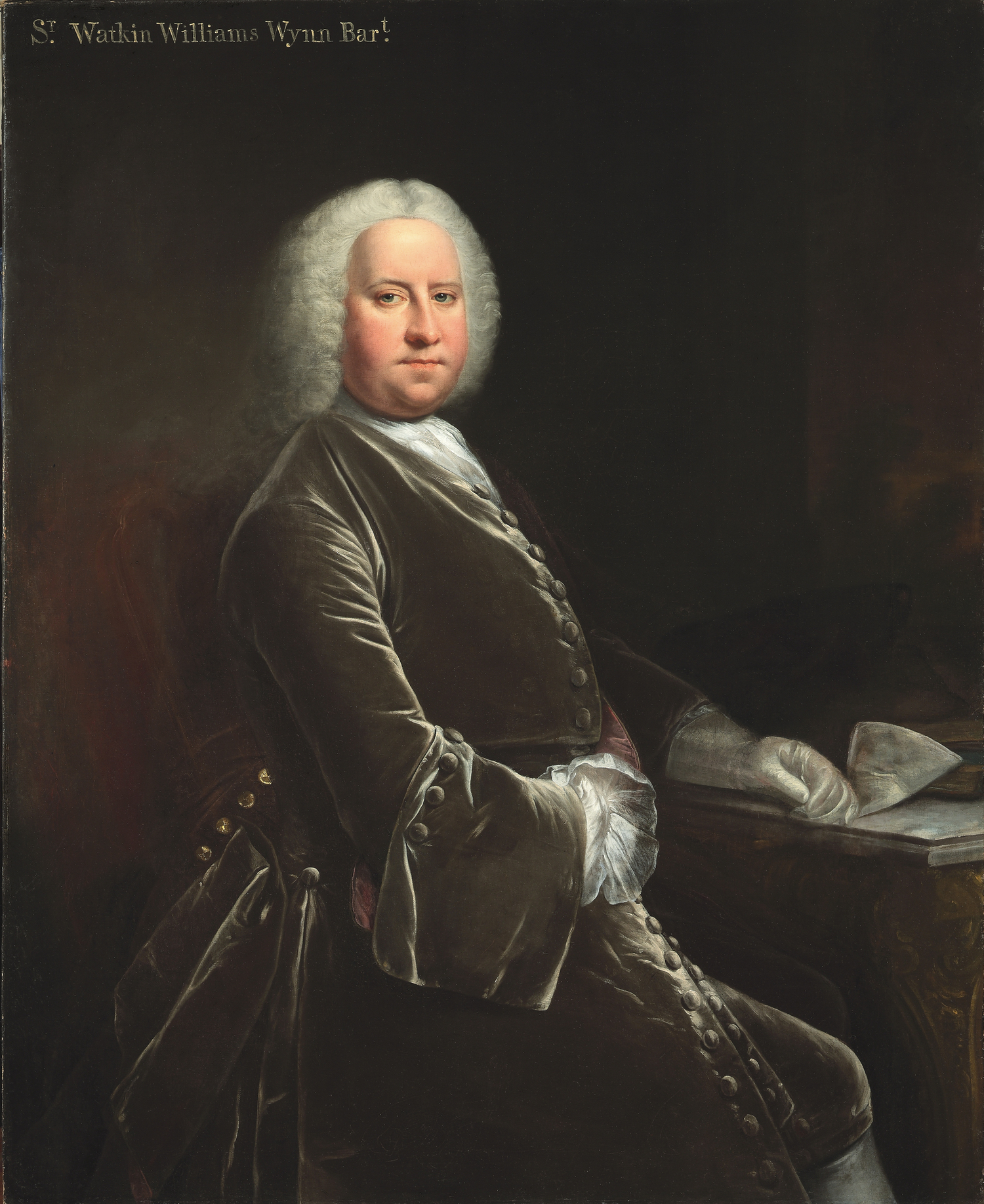
Sir Watkin Williams-Wynn, 3rd Baronet, late 1730s

The Williams-Wynn Baronetcy, of Gray's Inn in the County of Middlesex was created in the Baronetage of England on 6 July 1688 for William Williams, a prominent Welsh politician and lawyer from Anglesey, Wales. A member of the family, Sir Watkin, became one of the richest men in Britain.

== History ==
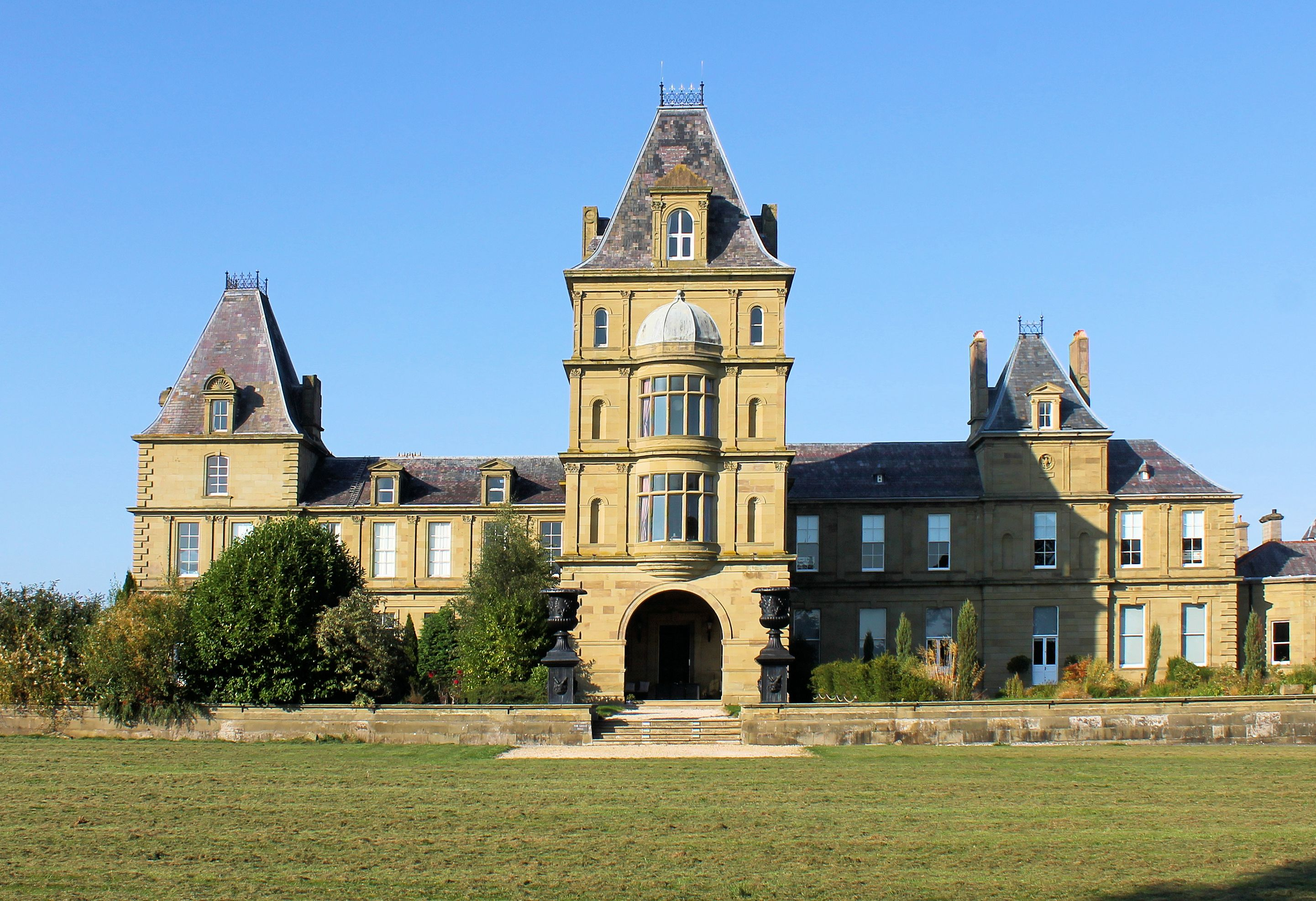
Wynnstay Hall, near Wrexham, Wales. Former seat of the Wynns

The first baronet served as Speaker of the House of Commons from 1680 to 1681. The second baronet represented Denbigh Boroughs in the House of Commons.

Sir Watkin, 3rd Baronet, sat as Member of Parliament for Denbighshire and was a prominent Jacobite. He was the husband of Jane (née Thelwall), great-granddaughter of Sir John Wynn, 1st Baronet, of Gwydir. Sir John Wynn was the direct male heir descendant of the princely House of Aberffraw through his ancestor Owain Gwynedd, first Prince of Wales. In 1718, he inherited, through his wife, the Wynnstay (formerly Watstay) estates on the death of Sir John Wynn, 5th Baronet, of Gwydir (see Wynn baronets), and assumed the same year the additional surname of Wynn in honor of his wife's princely heritage and claims as prince of Wales. (Note: It is claimed by some that there are living relatives of the Wynn family living in the United States who claim to be descended from either an Owen Wynn or a Hugh Wynn who supposedly emigrated there in the 17th century. However, the sources for both these claims are considered to be very unreliable and probably later constructions . Certainly, if there were any sons or grandsons of Owen Wynn alive in 1719 then they would have inherited the baronetcy. No one made any such claim, so it seems most unlikely that there were surviving sons or grandsons of Owen Wynn living in New England.)

By the 18th century the Williams-Wynn family had become the largest landowners in north Wales.

The fourth baronet represented Denbighshire in Parliament and was Custos Rotulorum for Lord Lieutenant of Merionethshire. The fifth baronet sat for Beaumaris and Denbighshire and was also Lord-Lieutenant of Merionethshire. The sixth baronet was a Member of Parliament for Denbighshire from July 1841 for the rest of his life.

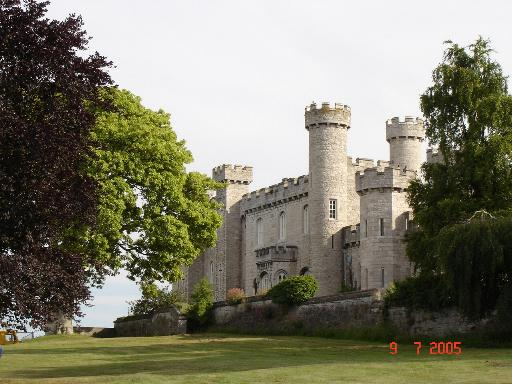
Bodelwyddan Castle – Williams-Wynn family seat from c.1880 to 1925

Sir Herbert, 7th Baronet, succeeded to the baronetcy in 1885 on the death of his uncle He inherited Bodelwyddan Castle from an heirless cousin in 1880 and made it the family's principal seat, refurbishing the castle in the 1880s. (Note: The Williams Baronetcy of Bodelwyddan in the County of Flint, was created in the Baronetage of Great Britain on 24 July 1798 for John Williams. He had previously served as High Sheriff of Flintshire. Williams was the great-grandson of John Williams, second son of Sir William Williams) Additionally, Sir Herbert briefly represented Denbighshire in 1885 before the constituency was abolished.

However, the costs of maintaining the estates and the burden of death duties became too great, and Sir Watkin, 8th Baronet, was forced to sell Bodelwyddan Castle and estate by 1925 and Wynnstay in 1948. Llwydiarth estate in Montgomeryshire was also sold and the Glan-llyn estate in Merionethshire accepted by the government in lieu of death duties. The baronet retired to the Llangedwyn estate.

The ninth baronet was Lord Lieutenant of Denbighshire, and the tenth baronet served as Lord Lieutenant of Denbighshire and of Clwyd.

Today, the family is represented by Sir Charles, 12th Baronet. His father, the 11th Baronet, was active in Welsh life in Denbighshire and Flintshire. In 2008 he was in the news because it was widely reported that his daughter Alexandra – a sculptor and student at the Royal Academy of Arts – had modelled nude for the famous artist Lucian Freud.

In the continued discussion of potential Welsh independence his name is sometimes brought forward as a theoretical candidate in Welsh monarchy scenarios. In the past, some Plaid Cymru members have advocated that an independent Wales would be better served by a Welsh constitutional monarchy, one which would engender the affection and allegiance of the Welsh people and legitimize Welsh sovereignty. An hereditary constitutional monarch would, they argued, embody and personify Welsh national identity above party politics, while political parties formed governments in a parliamentary system similar to those of Denmark, Norway, the Netherlands, or Spain.

The socialist and economist D.J. Davies wrote an article in Y Faner in 1953, and later published in English in the 1958 book Towards Welsh Freedom, in which he advocated for the elevation of a Welsh gentry family as the Royal Family of Wales. Among the criteria for consideration, argued Davies, was that the family had to have a history of contributing to Welsh life and reside in Wales. Today's Plaid Cymru members, however, are largely republican and the idea is rarely revived.

Through primogeniture, Sir David Williams-Wynn, 11th Baronet, may have been heir to the Aberffraw legacy and claim as princes of Wales, and could theoretically have used the appellation "Dafydd III of Wales". (Note: D.J. Davies wrote of the Rhys/Rice family of Dinefwr, perhaps unaware of the Williams-Wynn family and claims as descendants of the Wynn family.) (Note: An alternative title would be "Dafydd IV of Wales" if the 12th century usurpation of Dafydd ab Owain Gwynedd were considered part of the line of rulers.)

== Williams, later Williams-Wynn baronets of Gray's Inn (1688) ==
- Sir William Williams, 1st Baronet (c. 1634–1700)
- Sir William Williams, 2nd Baronet (c. 1665–1740)
- Sir Watkin Williams-Wynn, 3rd Baronet (1692–1749)
- Sir Watkin Williams-Wynn, 4th Baronet (1749–1789)
- Sir Watkin Williams-Wynn, 5th Baronet (1772–1840)
- Sir Watkin Williams-Wynn, 6th Baronet (1820–1885)
- Sir Herbert Lloyd Watkin Williams-Wynn, 7th Baronet (1860–1944)
- Sir Watkin Williams-Wynn, 8th Baronet (1891–1949)
- Sir Robert William Herbert Watkin Williams-Wynn, 9th Baronet (1862–1951)
- Sir Owen Watkin Williams-Wynn, 10th Baronet (1904–1988)
- Sir David Watkin Williams-Wynn, 11th Baronet (1940–2023)
- Charles Edward Watkin Williams-Wynn, 12th Baronet (born 1970).

The heir presumptive is the present holder's younger brother Robert Ewen Watkin Williams-Wynn (born 1977).

== Coat of arms ==
Coat of arms of Williams-Wynn baronets
Crest An eagle displayed or. Escutcheon Quarterly, 1st and 4th, Vert three eagles displayed in fesse or (Wynn), 2nd and 3rd, Argent two foxes counter-salient Gules the dexter surmounted of the sinister (Williams). Motto Eryr Eryror Eryri (The eagle of the eagles of Snowdon)

== See also ==
- Williams baronets
