= Lord Lieutenant of Denbighshire =

Welsh county ceremonial officer

This is an incomplete list of people who served as Lord Lieutenant of Denbighshire in Wales. After 1733, all Lord Lieutenants were also Custos Rotulorum of Denbighshire. The office was abolished on 31 March 1974, being replaced by the Lord Lieutenant of Clwyd.

== Lord Lieutenants of Denbighshire to 1974 ==
See Lord Lieutenant of Wales before 1694

1. Charles Talbot, 1st Duke of Shrewsbury, 31 May 1694 – 10 March 1696
2. Charles Gerard, 2nd Earl of Macclesfield, 10 March 1696 – 5 November 1701
3. William Stanley, 9th Earl of Derby, 18 June 1702 – 5 November 1702
4. Hugh Cholmondeley, 1st Earl of Cholmondeley, 2 December 1702 – 4 September 1713
5. Other Windsor, 2nd Earl of Plymouth, 4 September 1713 – 21 October 1714
6. Hugh Cholmondeley, 1st Earl of Cholmondeley, 21 October 1714 – 18 January 1725
7. George Cholmondeley, 2nd Earl of Cholmondeley, 7 April 1725 – 7 May 1733
8. Sir Robert Salusbury Cotton, 3rd Baronet, 21 June 1733 – 27 August 1748
9. Richard Myddelton, 20 August 1748 – March 1795
10. Vacant, March 1795 - 4 April 1796
11. Sir Watkin Williams-Wynn, 5th Baronet, 4 April 1796 – 6 January 1840
12. Robert Myddelton Biddulph, 8 February 1840 – 21 March 1872
13. William Cornwallis-West, 5 June 1872 – 4 July 1917
14. Lloyd Tyrell-Kenyon, 4th Baron Kenyon, 24 January 1918 – 30 November 1927
15. Sir Watkin Williams-Wynn, 9th Baronet, 23 February 1928 – 23 November 1951
16. John Charles Wynne-Finch, 21 November 1951 – 15 September 1966
17. Sir Owen Watkin Williams-Wynn, 10th Baronet, 15 September 1966 – 31 March 1974

== Deputy lieutenants ==
A deputy lieutenant of Denbighshire is commissioned by the Lord Lieutenant of Denbighshire. Deputy lieutenants support the work of the lord-lieutenant. There can be several deputy lieutenants at any time, depending on the population of the county. Their appointment does not terminate with the changing of the lord-lieutenant, but they usually retire at age 75.

=== 19th Century ===
- 1 February 1848: John Edward Madocks
- 1 February 1848: John Price
- 1 February 1848: Thomas Hughes of Ystrad
- 31 July 1852: Captain Ebenezer Jones
- 3 August 1852: Major Sir William Lloyd, Kt
- 3 August 1852: Thomas Downward
- 3 August 1852: James Maurice
- 3 August 1852: Thomas Penson

== Sources ==
- J.C. Sainty (1970). "Lieutenancies of Counties, 1585–1642". Bulletin of the Institute of Historical Research (Special Supplement No. 8).
- J.C. Sainty (1979). List of Lieutenants of Counties of England and Wales 1660-1974. London: Swift Printers (Sales) Ltd.
