= Wynn-Williams =

Wynn-Williams is a surname. It may refer to:

- C. E. Wynn-Williams (1903–1979), Welsh-born physicist
- Henry Wynn-Williams (1828–1913), 19th-century Member of Parliament and prominent lawyer in Christchurch

- Wynn Williams & Co, a law firm in Christchurch named after the above

- Sarah Wynn-Williams, New Zealand former Facebook director

== See also ==
- Williams-Wynn
