= Montgomeryshire Yeomanry =

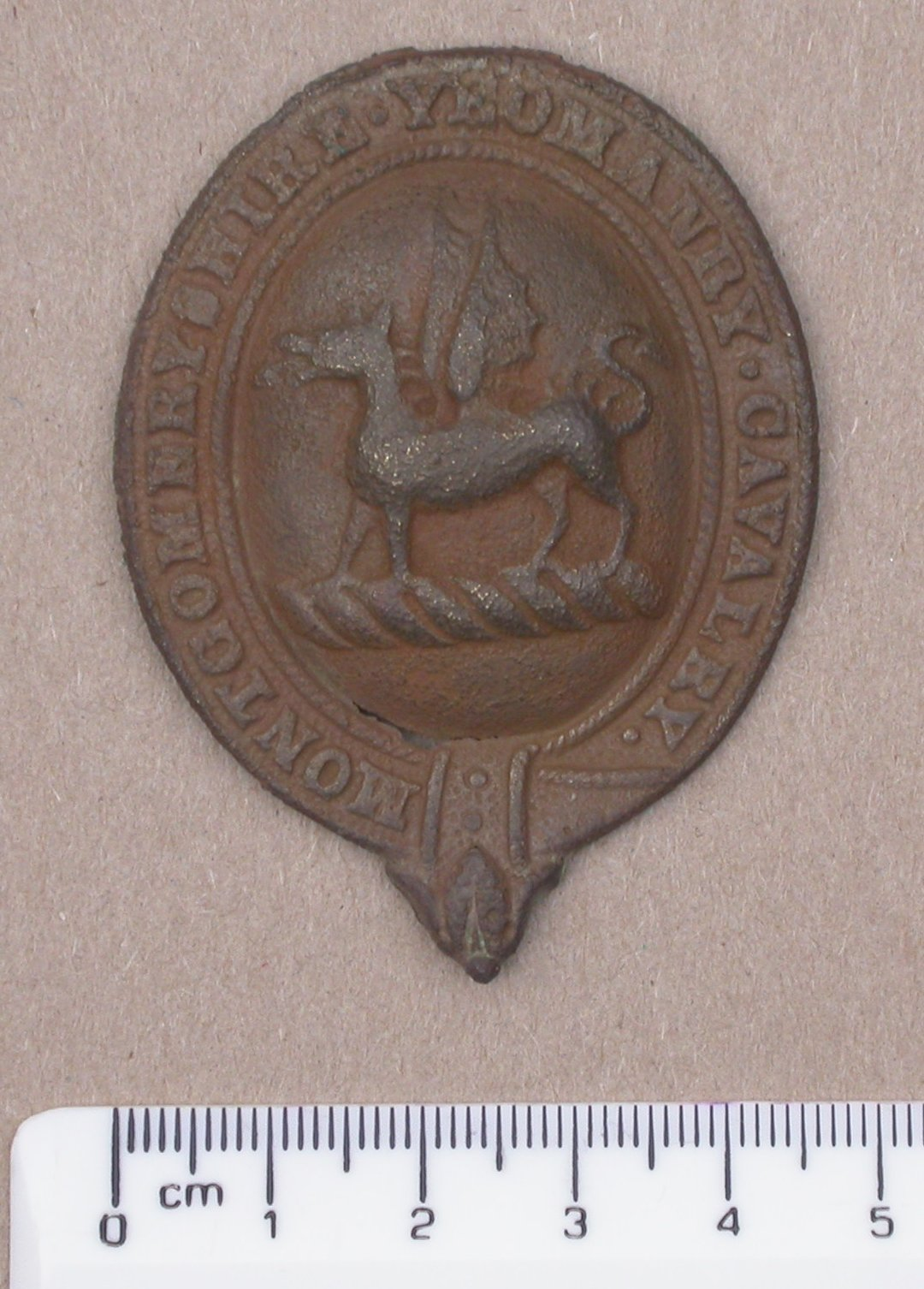
- Insignia of the Montgomeryshire Yeomanry
- Active: August 1803–March 1828; 13 January 1831 – 20 September 1920
- Country: United Kingdom
- Branch: Territorial Force
- Type: Yeomanry Cavalry; Infantry; Bicycle infantry
- Size: Boer War; Four Companies; World War One; Three Regiments
- Motto: Anorchfygol ('Unconquered')
- Engagements: Chartist riots Second Battle of Gaza; Third Battle of Gaza; Battle of Beersheba; Battle of Epehy

Commanders
- Notable commanders: Lt-Col Charles Watkin Williams-Wynn; Lt-Col Sir Watkin Williams-Wynn, 6th Baronet; Lt-Col Sir Herbert Williams-Wynn, 7th Baronet

The Montgomeryshire Yeomanry was a Welsh auxiliary unit of the British Army first formed in 1803. It served in home defence and for internal security, including deployments to deal with Chartist disturbances in the 1830s. It provided volunteers to the Imperial Yeomanry during the Second Boer War and formed three regiments for service during World War I. It was broken up and converted to infantry and artillery in 1920.

== Napoleonic Wars ==
During the French Revolutionary Wars of the 1790s a number of English and Welsh counties formed part-time units of Yeomanry Cavalry and Volunteer Infantry for home defence and internal security duties. The Welsh county of Montgomeryshire failed to raise any yeomanry or volunteers at this time. However, after the short-lived Peace of Amiens broke down in 1803, under the leadership of Charles Watkin Williams-Wynn, Member of Parliament for Montgomeryshire, the county rapidly two formed Troops of Yeomanry cavalry, at Montgomery and Welshpool by August 1803. Williams-Wynn took command as Major-Commandant, and a third troop soon followed at Newtown and Abermule. By 2 November this had expanded into a large force, the Montgomeryshire Volunteer Legion. In contemporary terminology a 'Legion' was an all-arms force, and soon after its formation the Montgomeryshire unit comprised three Troops of Yeomanry cavalry each 40 strong, and 20 Companies of Volunteer infantry, with Watkins-Wynn as Lieutenant-Colonel-Commandant and commander of the legion's cavalry. Charles Hanbury-Tracy was the second lieutenant-colonel.

The legion's cavalry established its headquarters at Trehelig-gro, Welshpool. It carried out 14 days' training at Wrexham in 1804, and 21 days at Shrewsbury in 1805, after which activity declined. By 1808, Volunteers numbers were falling and government dissatisfaction led to their replacement by a force of Local Militia, whose ranks could if necessary be filled by compulsion using the Militia ballot. Many Volunteer units chose to transfer to the new force en masse, and the Montgomeryshire Legion infantry easily filled the new Eastern and Western Montgomeryshire Local Militia. The cavalry troops however remained in being as the Montgomeryshire Yeomanry Cavalry, increased to a strength of 184 all ranks by September 1809. Training was held at Oswestry in October 1809 (8 days), and at Welshpool in 1810 (12 days), 1812 (14 days) and 1813 (14 days) A further troop was raised at Berriew in May 1813, bringing the establishment of the unit (termed a 'corps') up to 238, and from that year the Yeomanry received Regular Army pay when training.

== 19th Century ==
The wars ended with the Battle of Waterloo. The militia and local militia were stood down, but recognising their usefulness as an aid to the civil power, the government kept the yeomanry in being. The Montgomeryshire Yeomanry was drawn out for training in 1815 and 1817. During the summer of 1819 it sent a troop to deal with disturbances in Newtown and Abermule and because of the unrest two further troops were raised in December that year, at Llangedwyn and Llanfyllin, giving the unit the status of a regiment. In 1821 the establishment of each troop was raised to 50 privates. Training was carried out each year until 1826, when the regiment was organised as follows:

- 1st Troop (Newtown) – Captain Edward Farmer, 48 men
- 2nd Troop (Montgomery) – Capt Pryce Devereaux, 61 men
- 3rd Troop (Llanfyllin) – Capt Wythen Jones, 48 men
- 4th Troop (Llangedwyn) – Capt David Pugh, 53 men
- 5th Troop (Berriew) – Capt Winder Lyon, 55 men
- 6th Troop (Welshpool) – Capt A.D. Jones, 46 men

However, in 1827 the government withdrew funding from the yeomanry. As the officers and men of the Montgomeryshire Yeomanry were unwilling to serve at their own expense, the regiment was disbanded in March 1828.

=== Chartist disturbances ===
Within three years, a wave of unrest across the country led to a number of yeomanry regiments being reformed. In view of the civil disturbances in north-east Wales, Charles Watkins-Wyn applied to reform the Montgomeryshire Yeomanry. Approval to reform a regiment of four troops was received on 13 January 1831 and they were organised as follows:

- Berriew Troop – Capt J.W.L. Winder; disbanded by September 1831
- Newtown Troop – Capt H.A. Proctor
- Montgomery Troop – Capt Rice Pryce Buckley Williams (promoted to major 4 May 1837)
- Welshpool Troop – Capt J. Davies Corrie
- Llangedwyn Troop – Capt A. Bonner Maurice; authorised 25 February 1831

The establishment of a troop was 50 privates, soon raised to 63, giving a total strength of 296 all ranks. They assembled at Welshpool for training in October 1831, most of the men having been in the earlier regiment. Training was carried out at Welshpool or Newtown almost each year thereafter. In the autumn of 1832 it provided the escort when the Duchess of Kent and Princess (later Queen) Victoria visited Powis Castle.

Although the government reduced Yeomanry funding again in 1838, the Montgomeryshire regiment was unaffected because of the continuing unrest in the county. In December 1837 two troops had been called out to deal with Chartist disturbances at Caersws but the use of force was not required. Troops were called out again in May and December 1838. The worst trouble came in May 1839 when Chartist activities at Llanidloes led to the despatch of three police officers from London and the swearing-in of 200 Special constables. The arrest of three activists angered the Chartists, and an armed mob rescued the prisoners and caused damage to property. The Montgomeryshire Yeomanry, 200 strong, reinforced by four troops of the South Salopian Yeomanry marched from Welshpool to Llandiloes, arriving on 4 May, by which time the town was in the hands of the insurgents. The yeomanry immediately searched the town, making a number of arrests, uncovering arms caches, and restoring order. Further reinforced by two companies of the 14th Foot next day, the yeomanry conducted further searches and pursuits of the ringleaders. After thee days the area was quiet again and the yeomanry were stood down on 10 May. The Home Secretary congratulated the Montgomeryshire Yeomanry on their prompt assembly when called out, and for their service.

Lieutenant-Col Williams-Wynn retired at the age of 77 in 1844 and from 26 January the commanding officer (CO) was Lt-Col Sir Watkin Williams-Wynn, 6th Baronet of Wynnstay, a former officer in the 1st Life Guards (as were a number of the regiment's officers). He was simultaneously Lt-Col of the 1st Denbighshire Rifle Volunteers from 1862. Under his command the regiment's drill and efficiency was improved, and about 1850 its old flintlock pistols were replaced by Carbines. From 1851 the regiment was organised as follows:

- 1st (later A) Trp (Newtown) – Maj Viscount Seaham, later Earl Vane (formerly 1st LG)
- 2nd (later B) Trp (Berriew) – Capt C.W. Williams-Wynn
- 3rd (later C) Trp (Welshpool) – Capt R.D. Jones
- 4th (later D) Trp (Llangedwyn) – Capt R.M.B. Maurice
- E Trp (Lalnfyllin) – Capt John Dugdale of Llwyn; reformed 1862
- F Trp (Caersws) – Capt W.H. Adams; reformed 1862

=== Cardwell Reforms ===
The Cardwell Reforms of 1871 saw the Yeomanry transferred from the county Lords-Lieutenant to the War Office. Training was improved for officers and permanent staff drill-sergeants, musketry training was improved, and regiments were drilled as squadrons of two troops. Sir Watkin Williams-Wynn retired in June 1877 and became the regiment's Honorary Colonel. Major C.W. Williams-Wynn was promoted to succeed him, and in turn was replaced in June 1878 by Sir Watkin's nephew, Sir William Granville Williams, 4th Baronet of Bodelwyddan,

The Montgomeryshire Yeomanry had been re-equipped with the Westley Richards .499 calibre breechloading carbine in 1871, and was rearmed again by 1881 with the Snider .577 carbine. Captain Aubone G. Fife, formerly of the 6th Dragoon Guards, appointed adjutant in 1882, laid great emphasis on musketry training, but this was hampered by the lack of suitable ranges for these more powerful and longer-range weapons. A partial solution was provided by Capt R. Pryce Jones, who refurbished the old volunteer ranges at Penarth at his own expense. The Snider was replaced by the Martini–Henry .455 calibre carbine in 1886, and in 1889 a new range was built at Llangedwynn for the Llangedwynn and Llanfyllin troops. Regimental headquarters (RHQ) was fixed at Welshpool, and Newtown was not used for training after 1885 because there was insufficient space there for squadron training.

In March 1885 Aubone Fife was promoted to command the regiment, and was succeeded in turn on 2 February 1889 by Sir Herbert Williams-Wynn, 7th Baronet of Wynnstay. Because of difficulties in finding sufficient officers, the Caersws Troop was disbanded in 1889, and the personnel were transferred to the Newtown Troop. However a new F Trp was raised at Guilsfield in 1892. A reorganisation of the Yeomanry in 1893 saw the troops formally reorganised into squadrons. For the Montgomery Yeomanry this gave the following organisation:

- RHQ (Welshpool) – Lt-Col Sir Herbert Williams-Wynn
- A Squadron (Llangedwyn & Llanfyllin) – Capt Robert Williams-Wynn
- B Squadron (Welshpool & Guilsfield) – Capt A. Williams-Wynn
- C Squadron (Newtown & Berriew) – Capt N. Robinson

As part of the reorganisation, from April 1893 the Army List showed the Yeomanry regiments grouped into brigades for collective training. They were commanded by the senior regimental commanding officer but they did have a Regular Army Brigade major. The Montgomeryshire Yeomanry together with the Denbighshire Hussars formed the 15th Yeomanry Brigade, part of 8th Division. The brigade first came together for training in 1895 at Welshpool under the command of Sir Herbert Williams-Wynn. Brigade camps were held at Rhyl in 1897 and at the Williams-Wynn estate of Wynnstay in 1900. In 1896 the Montgomeryshires were among the first yeomanry regiments to be re-equipped with the Martini–Metford .303 calibre carbine; reduced charge ammunition was supplied for safe use on the ranges. In 1897 Major Edward Pryce-Jones, MP, was transferred from the regiment to form a new 5th Volunteer Battalion, South Wales Borderers.

== Imperial Yeomanry ==
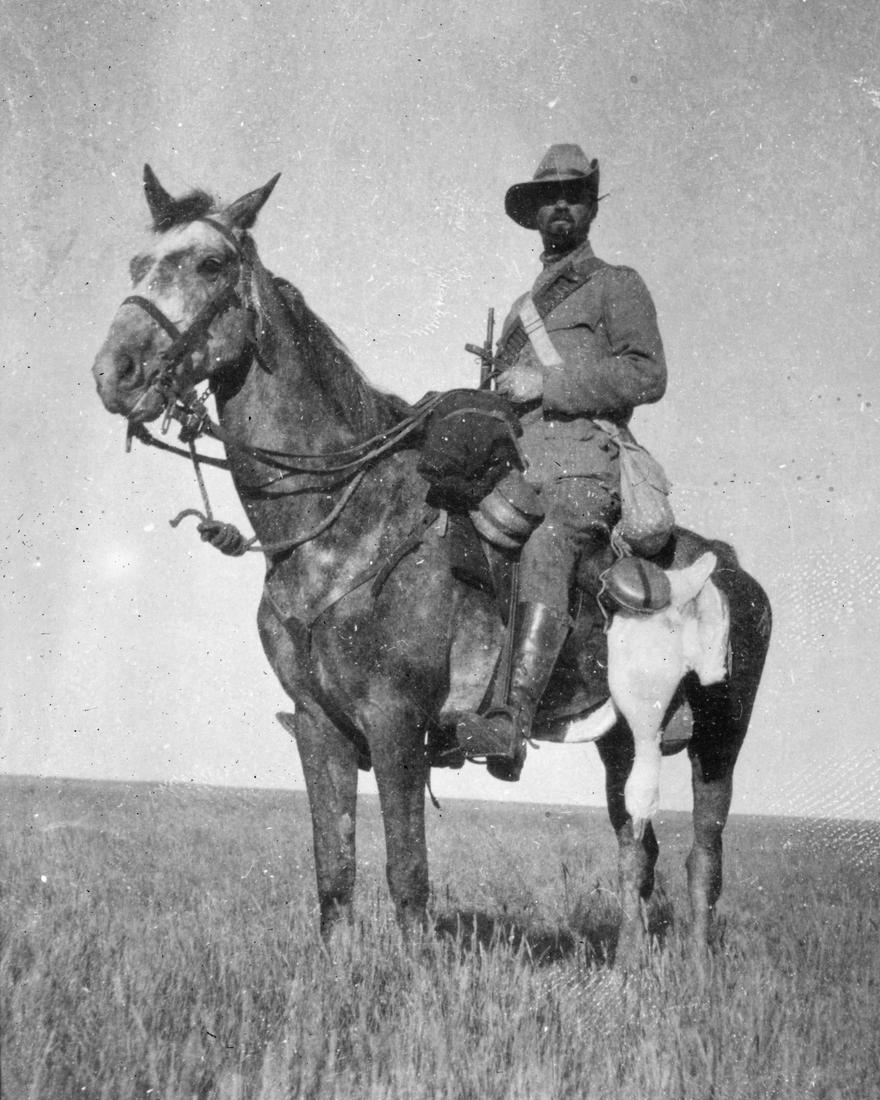
Imperial yeoman on the Veldt.

=== Second Boer War ===
Following a string of defeats during Black Week in early December 1899, the British government realised that it would need more troops than just the regular army to fight the Second Boer War, particularly mounted troops. On 13 December, the War Office decided to allow volunteer forces to serve in the field, and a Royal Warrant was issued on 24 December that officially created the Imperial Yeomanry (IY). The Royal Warrant asked standing Yeomanry regiments to provide service companies of approximately 115 men each for one year. In addition to this, many British citizens (usually mid-upper class) volunteered to join the new force.

The Montgomeryshire Yeomanry raised two companies for the first contingent of the IY, which both landed in South Africa on 6 April 1900 and were assigned to the 9th (Welsh) Battalion, Imperial Yeomanry:

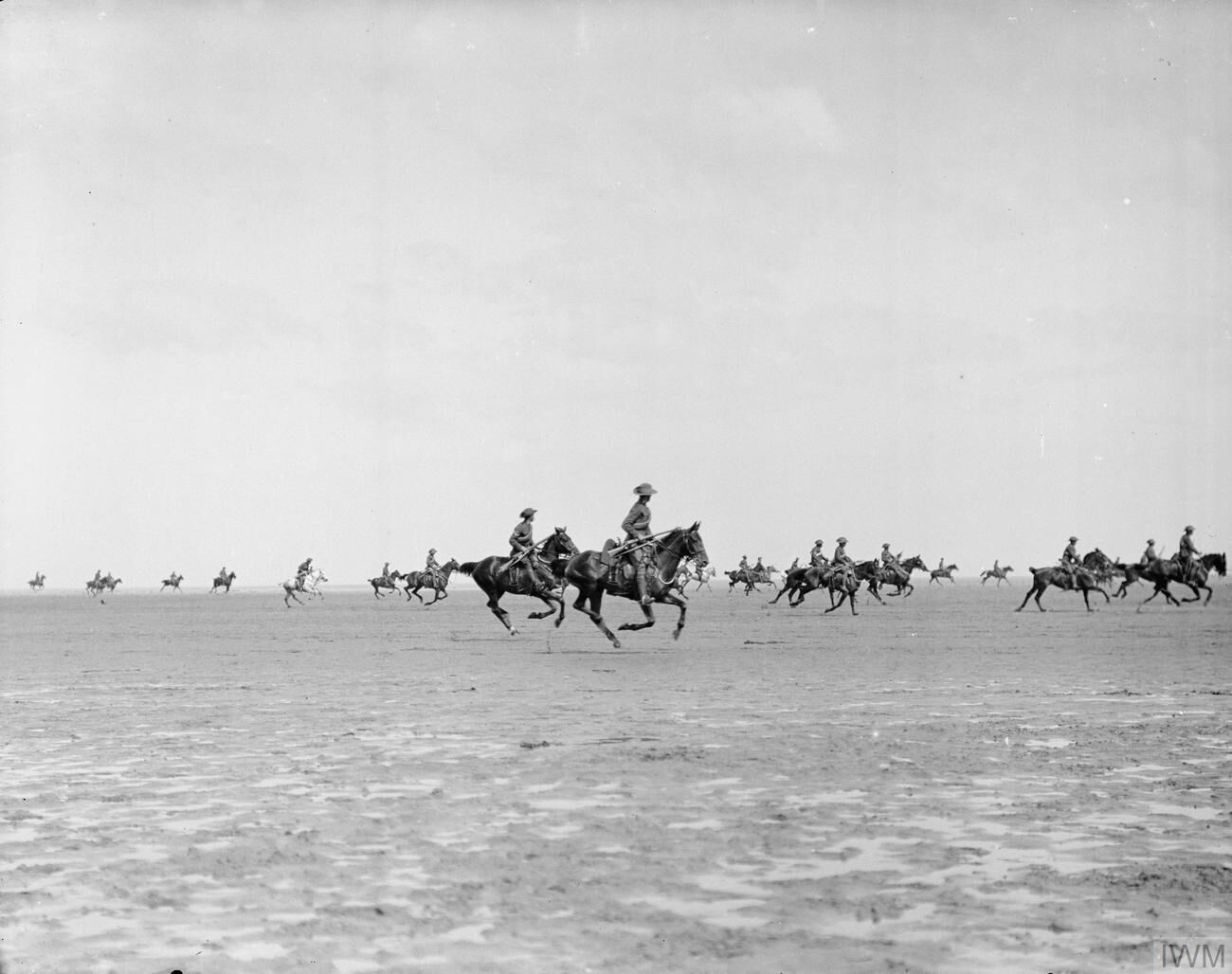
Imperial Yeomanry galloping over a plain during the Second Boer War.

- 31st (Montgomeryshire) Company
- 49th (Montgomeryshire) Company

When the first contingent returned home in 1901 after their one-year term of service, enough veterans of the 31st and 49th stayed on to reform the companies, while the Montgomeryshire Yeomanry raised two further companies for the second contingent, which also served in the 9th Battalion:

- 88th (Welsh Yeomanry) Company (sponsored by the Montgomeryshire Yeomanry)
- 89th (Montgomeryshire) Company

This service earned the regiment its first Battle honour: South Africa 1900–01. Sir Herbert Williams-Wynn, who was instrumental in raising the four companies, was awarded a CB in 1902. He was appointed Honorary Colonel of the regiment when he retired in 1907.

Captain Robert Williams-Wynn, younger brother of the CO, went to South Africa with 31st Company. During the campaign he was twice Mentioned in Dispatches and was afterwards promoted to major and awarded the DSO.

=== Montgomeryshire Imperial Yeomanry ===
The Imperial Yeomanry were trained and equipped as mounted infantry. The concept was considered a success and before the war ended the existing Yeomanry regiments at home were converted into Imperial Yeomanry, with an establishment of RHQ and four squadrons with a machine gun section. This included the Montgomeryshire Imperial Yeomanry, with RHQ at Brook Street drill hall, Welshpool, which raised an additional squadron at Rhayader in Radnorshire. The brigade system was abolished at the same time.

In 1906 Major Robert Williams-Wynn, DSO, was promoted to command the regiment in succession to his brother, who became its Honorary Colonel the following year.

== Territorial Force ==
The Imperial Yeomanry were subsumed into the new Territorial Force (TF) under the Haldane Reforms of 1908. and the regiment was officially titled the Montgomeryshire Yeomanry (Dragoons) with the following organisation:

- RHQ at Brook Street, Welshpool
- A Squadron at Llanfyllin, with detachments at Meifod, Llanrhaeadr-ym-Mochnant, Llanfihangel-yng-Ngwynfa, Llangedwyn, Trefonen, Llanfair Caereinion, and Llansantffraid-ym-Mechain
- B Squadron at Welshpool, with detachments at Guilsfield, Castle Caereinion, Four Crosses, Chirbury, Berriew, Trewern and Forden
- C Squadron at Newtown, with detachments at Church Stoke, Caersws, New MiIls, Llanbrynmair, Montgomery, Trefeglwys, Bettws Cedewain, Cemmaes Road, Dolfor and Llangurig
- D Squadron at Llandrindod Wells, with detachments at Llanidloes, Builth Wells, Ryhayader, Llanbister, Bowling Green Lane, Knighton and Hay-on-Wye

The regiment formed part of the TF's South Wales Mounted Brigade (SWMB), based at Carmarthen.

== World War I ==
=== Mobilisation ===
When war was declared on 4 August 1914, the Montgomeryshire Yeomanry mobilised at Brook Street Drill Hall with Brevet Colonel Robert Williams-Wynn, DSO, in command. It joined the SWMB at Carmarthen and then went with it by train to Hereford.

In accordance with the Territorial and Reserve Forces Act 1907 (7 Edw. 7, c.9) which brought the TF into being, it was intended to be a home defence force for service during wartime and members could not be compelled to serve outside the country. However, on 10 August 1914 the TF was invited to volunteer for overseas service. In the SWMB the Montgomeryshire and Glamorgan Yeomanry signed up en masse at Hereford, though the Pembroke Yeomanry were less enthusiastic. On 15 August the War Office issued instructions to separate those men who had signed up for Home Service only, and form these into reserve units. On 31 August, the formation of a reserve or 2nd Line unit was authorised for each 1st Line unit where 60 per cent or more of the men had volunteered for Overseas Service. The titles of these 2nd Line units would be the same as the original, but distinguished by a '2/' prefix. In this way duplicate battalions, brigades and divisions were created, mirroring those TF formations being sent overseas. Later, the 2nd Line was prepared for overseas service and a 3rd Line was formed to act as a reserve, providing trained replacements for the 1st and 2nd Line regiments.

=== 1/1st Montgomeryshire Yeomanry ===
The 1/1st Montgomeryshire Yeomanry moved with the 1/1st SWMB to East Anglia and was stationed in Norfolk, at Thetford by 29 August, moving to Blickling shortly afterwards. The following month the brigade joined the 1st Mounted Division. In East Anglia the division was able to train while at the same time forming part of the defence forces for the East Coast. By September 1915 the 1/1st Montgomeryshire Yeomanry was based at Holt. In October it moved to Cromer. In November the 1/1st SWMB was dismounted.

==== Egypt and Palestine ====
The 1/1st SWMB embarked at Devonport on 4 March 1916 and sailed to Egypt in company with the 1/1st Welsh Border Mounted Brigade from 1st Mtd Division. They disembarked at Alexandria on 14–15 March and on 20 March the two brigades were merged to form the 4th Dismounted Brigade. At first this was placed in the Suez Canal defences under 53rd (Welsh) Division, with 1/1st Montgomeryshire Yeomanry at Beni Salama, but in April it came under the command of Western Frontier Force.

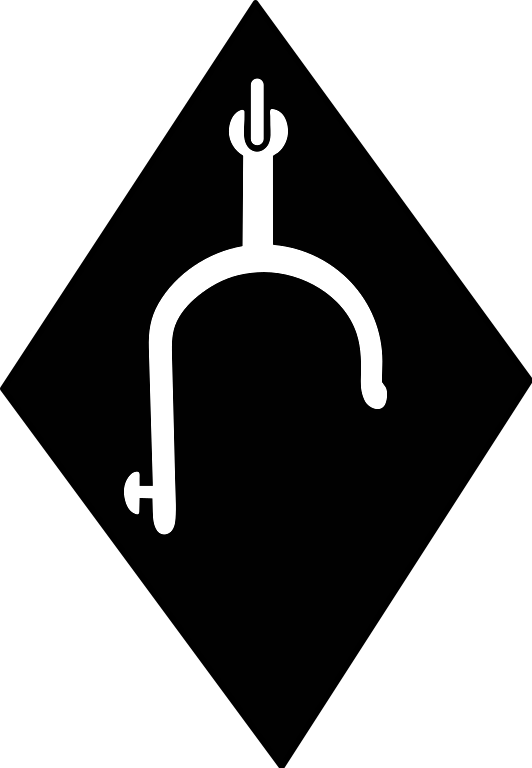
The 'broken spur' insignia of 74th (Yeomanry) Division, made up from dismounted yeomanry units.

In January 1917 the dismounted yeomanry of 4th Mtd Bde were permanently re-roled as infantry. The brigade became 231st Brigade, which joined 74th (Yeomanry) Division on its formation in March 1917. On 4 March at Halmia, 1/1st Montgomeryshire Yeomanry amalgamated with 1/1st Welsh Horse Yeomanry (Note: The Welsh Horse Yeomanry was a war-formed unit administered by the Montgomeryshire Territorial Association. The 1/1st regiment had served at Gallipoli.) to form 25th (Montgomery and Welsh Horse Yeomanry) Battalion, Royal Welch Fusiliers (RWF).

74th (Y) Division was in reserve for the Second Battle of Gaza (17–19 April) and then saw action at the Third Battle of Gaza (27 October–7 November) including the Capture of Beersheba (31 October), where 25th RWF distinguished itself in storming the Turkish positions. It took part in the Capture of the Sheria feature (6 November), the Capture of Jerusalem (8–9 December) and its subsequent defence (27–30 December). Early in 1918 it fought in the Battle of Tell 'Asur.

==== Western Front ====
In May 1918 the 74th (Y) Division was sent to reinforce the British Expeditionary Force (BEF) on the Western Front. It participated in the Second Battle of Bapaume (2–3 September) and then fought through the battles of the Hindenburg Line including the Battle of Épehy on 18 September. Attacking on 18 September the battalion was stopped by massed machine gun fire, suffering heavy casualties among its officers and NCOs. Reduced to 120 men by the end of the day, it was temporarily reorganised into two companies commanded by 2nd Lieutenants. For his actions on 18 September, a pre-war member of the Montgomeryshire Yeomanry serving with the 25th RWF, Lance-Sergeant William Herbert Waring, won a posthumous Victoria Cross. The battalion then served though the final advance in Artois and Flanders until the Armistice with Germany on 11 November. After the Armistice 25th RWF was reduced to cadre in France and disbanded on 29 June 1919.

=== 2/1st Montgomeryshire Yeomanry ===
2/1st Montgomeryshire Yeomanry was formed at Welshpool in September 1914 and trained with 2/1st South Wales Mounted Brigade at Carmarthen. In July 1915 2/1st SWMB moved to Dorchester. In September 1915 it moved to Southwold and the brigade joined 1st Mounted Division, replacing 1/1st SWMB as the latter prepared to sail to Egypt.

On 4 March the regiment absorbed the 2/1st Welsh Horse Yeomanry. On 31 March 1916, the remaining mounted brigades were numbered in a single sequence and the 2/1st South Wales Mounted Brigade brigade was numbered as 4th Mounted Brigade. In April 1916, the regiment went to Rendlesham with the brigade. In July 1916 it moved to Thornton Park near Brentwood and joined 2nd Mounted Brigade in the new 1st Mounted Division.

In October 1916 the 2/1st Montgomeryshire Yeomanry became a cyclist unit, amalgamating with the 2/1st Denbighshire Hussars to form the 3rd (Denbigh and Montgomery) Yeomanry Cyclist Regiment (Note: Frederick and James name the combined unit as '3rd (Montgomery and Denbigh Yeomanry) Cyclist Battalion' but '3rd (Denbigh and Montgomery) Yeomanry Cyclist Battalion' would seem more plausible given that the Denbighshire Hussars were ranked 16th in the Yeomanry order of precedence whereas the Montgomeryshire Yeomanry were ranked 35th. The Long, Long Trail concurs that it should be Denbigh & Montgomery) in the 1st Cyclist Brigade at Worlingham near Beccles. In March 1917 the regiment resumed its identity as 2/1st Montgomeryshire Yeomanry, still with the 1st Cyclist Brigade, still at Worlingham. By November 1917 it was at Gorleston where it remained until the end of the war. It was disbanded in 1919.

=== 3/1st Montgomeryshire Yeomanry ===
The 3rd Line regiment was formed in June 1915 at Welshpool. In July it was at Brecon and then it was affiliated to the 6th Reserve Cavalry Regiment at The Curragh in Ireland. By September it was at Marlborough Barracks in Dublin, later moving to Arbour Hill Barracks. It participated in the action against the Easter Rising in Dublin in April 1916. In June 1916 the regiment was dismounted and attached to the 3rd Line Groups of the Welsh Division at Gobowen because its 1st Line was serving as infantry. The regiment was disbanded in January 1917 with personnel transferring to the 2/1st Montgomeryshire Yeomanry or to the 4th (Reserve) (Denbighshire) Battalion, Royal Welsh Fusiliers at Oswestry.

== Postwar ==
Wartime experience had proved that there were too many mounted units, and when the TF was reconstituted as the Territorial Army (TA), only the 14 most senior Yeomanry regiments were retained as horsed cavalry, the remainder being converted to other roles. The Welsh Horse Yeomanry had only been raised on 18 August 1914 and had been absorbed by the Montgomeryshire Yeomanry in 1917; it was never reformed.

One squadron of the Montgomeryshire Yeomanry combined with a company of the 1st Battalion, Herefordshire Regiment to form 332 (Radnorshire) Field Battery (Howitzers) at Llandrindod Wells, Radnorshire, as part of 83rd (Welsh) Brigade, Royal Field Artillery, while the rest of the regiment formed two companies in the 7th (Merionethshire and Montgomeryshire) Battalion, Royal Welch Fusiliers (originally the 5th Volunteer Battalion, South Wales Borderers, see above) on 3 March 1920, and the yeomanry lineage was discontinued.

== Heritage & ceremonial ==
=== Uniforms ===
When first formed the Montgomeryshire Yeomanry wore a Light dragoon uniform with a Tarleton helmet. In 1820 or 1821 this was updated to the more modern uniform worn by the regular light dragoons of a black Shako with drooping white horsehair plume, a scarlet double-breasted Coatee with gold and crimson lancer girdle, and blue overalls with a red stripe.

When the regiment was revived in 1831 the uniform was based on that of the 7th Dragoon Guards, with a high Roman style helmet with a black bearskin crest, a single-breasted scarlet coatee with black facings and lancer girdle, and blue overalls with a red stripe. In 1846 the helmet was replaced by a black helmet with black horsehair mane, similar to that adopted by the regular heavy cavalry, though the regiment's 'appointments' were those of light dragoons. In 1856 the Albert helmet, worn by regulars since 1847, was introduced, in black japanned metal, and then in 1860 an infantry-style single-breasted tunic was adopted. Then in 1866 the Albert helmet was abandoned and a busby adopted, giving the regiment a hybrid half-dragoon, half-Hussar appearance. In 1882 the regiment reverted to a helmet, now similar to the 6th Dragoon Guards but at first without the plume; a white falling horsehair plume was worn by 1899.

=== Insignia ===
The regimental badge was the Red dragon of Wales, and the motto was Anorchfygol ('Unconquered') used in various combinations. In 1821 the dragon and motto appeared on the shako plate, and the buttons had the dragon and letters 'M.Y.C.'. On the 1831, 1846 and 1856 helmet plates the dragon appeared within a garter belt inscribed with the motto, above which was a three-part scroll displaying 'MONTGOMERYSHIRE YEOMANRY CAVALRY'. On the 1883 helmet the oval belt enclosing the dragon carried this title rather than the motto.

By 1899 the badge worn on the Forage cap and Service cap was a dragon over the letters "MYC". When the regiment became imperial yeomanry the letters changed to 'MIY' on a scroll; similar badges were used on the collar. The buttons also had the dragon over 'MIY'. After the formation of the TF the brass collar badge and shoulder titles worn on the khaki field service dress were 'MONTGOMERY' with 'Y' (sometimes 'T' over 'Y') above.

=== Standards & guidons ===
Yeomanry cavalry were not authorised to carry standards or guidons, but most regiments ignored this and carried them unofficially. The Montgomeryshire Yeomanry's three troops were presented with swallow-tailed guidons in 1805. These were of crimson silk fringed in gold and sin the centre had a gold dragon on a green pale, beneath a gold scroll lettered 'ANORCHFYGOL'. In the upper canton nearest the pole and diagonally opposite were gold-edge green circles carrying the letters 'MY' in gold; in the opposite corners were red circles carrying the White Horse of Hanover. Lady Williams-Wynn presented new standards in 1852 and the old ones were laid up at Wynnstay where they were destroyed in a disastrous fire in 1856. The new standards were a Queen's standard and five troop standards. The Queen's was a crimson swallowtail with in the centre the rose, thistle and shamrock surmounted by a crown; beneath were two gold scrolls, the upper with the Royal motto 'DIEU ET MON DROIT', the lower with the regimental title. In the upper canton nearest the pole and in the opposite corner were the white horse in a gold-edged crimson circle, in the opposite corners were gold-edged black circles bearing the red dragon on a green pale with the motto 'ANORCHFYGOL'. The troop standards were gold-fringed black silk with in the centre the red dragon streaked with gold on a green pale, a gold scroll above bearing the regimental motto. In the upper canton and its opposite corner were the white horse, in the opposite corners were gold-edged red circles with 'MYC' in gold letters. Each standard had the troop number in black beneath the central device. The official guidon of the regiment in the TF had a circle lettered 'MONTGOMERYSHIRE YEOMANRY' beneath a crown and surrounded by a Union Wreath of roses, thistles and shamrocks; beneath was the battle honour 'SOUTH AFRICA 1901'.

=== Honorary colonels ===
The following served as honorary colonel of the unit:

- Sir Watkin Williams-Wynn, 6th Baronet, former CO, appointed 18 July 1877
- Sir Herbert Williams-Wynn, 7th Baronet, former CO, appointed 1 November 1907

=== Battle honours ===
The regiment was awarded the following Battle honours:

- South Africa 1901
- Egypt, 1916–17
- Palestine, 1917–18
- France and Flanders, 1918

== See also ==
- Imperial Yeomanry
- List of Yeomanry Regiments 1908
- Yeomanry
- Yeomanry order of precedence
- British yeomanry during the First World War
- Second line yeomanry regiments of the British Army
- William Herbert Waring, VC

== Bibliography ==
- L.S. Amery (ed), The Times History of the War in South Africa 1899-1902, London: Sampson Low, Marston, 6 Vols 1900–09.
- Maj A.F. Becke,History of the Great War: Order of Battle of Divisions, Part 2a: The Territorial Force Mounted Divisions and the 1st-Line Territorial Force Divisions (42–56), London: HM Stationery Office, 1935/Uckfield: Naval & Military Press, 2007, ISBN 1-847347-39-8.
- Maj A.F. Becke,History of the Great War: Order of Battle of Divisions, Part 2b: The 2nd-Line Territorial Force Divisions (57th–69th), with the Home-Service Divisions (71st–73rd) and 74th and 75th Divisions, London: HM Stationery Office, 1937/Uckfield: Naval & Military Press, 2007, ISBN 1-847347-39-8.
- Burke's Peerage, Baronetage and Knightage, 100th Edn, London, 1953.
- Col John K. Dunlop, The Development of the British Army 1899–1914, London: Methuen, 1938.
- Brig-Gen Sir James E. Edmonds, History of the Great War: Military Operations, France and Belgium 1918, Vol IV, 8th August–26th September: The Franco-British Offensive, London: Macmillan, 1939/Uckfield: Imperial War Museum and Naval & Military, 2009, ISBN 978-1-845747-28-2.
- J.B.M. Frederick, Lineage Book of British Land Forces 1660–1978, Vol I, Wakefield, Microform Academic, 1984, ISBN 1-85117-007-3.
- Brig E.A. James, British Regiments 1914–18, London: Samson Books, 1978, ISBN 0-906304-03-2/Uckfield: Naval & Military Press, 2001, ISBN 978-1-84342-197-9.
- Steven John, Welsh Yeomanry at War: A History of the 24th (Pemroke & Glamorgan Yeomanry) Battalion, The Welsh Regiment, Barnsley: Pen & Sword, 2016, ISBN 978-1-47383-362-3.
- N.B. Leslie, Battle Honours of the British and Indian Armies 1695–1914, London: Leo Cooper, 1970, ISBN 0-85052-004-5.
- Norman E.H. Litchfield, The Territorial Artillery 1908–1988 (Their Lineage, Uniforms and Badges), Nottingham: Sherwood Press, 1992, ISBN 0-9508205-2-0.
- Mileham, Patrick (1994). The Yeomanry Regiments; 200 Years of Tradition. Edinburgh: Canongate Academic. ISBN 1-898410-36-4.
- Bryn Owen, History of the Welsh Militia and Volunteer Corps 1757–1908: Montgomeryshire Regiments of Militia, Volunteers and Yeomanry Cavalry, Wrexham: Bridge Books, 2000, ISBN 1-872424-85-6.
- Rinaldi, Richard A (2008). Order of Battle of the British Army 1914. Ravi Rikhye. ISBN 978-0-97760728-0.
- Col H.C.B. Rogers, The Mounted Troops of the British Army 1066–1945, London: Seeley Service, 1959.
- Lt-Col Ernest Ryan, 'Arms, Uniforms and Equipment of the Yeomanry Cavalry', Journal of the Society for Army Historical Research, September 1957, Vol 35, pp. 124–33.
- Arthur Sleigh, The Royal Militia and Yeomanry Cavalry Army List, April 1850, London: British Army Despatch Press, 1850/Uckfield: Naval and Military Press, 1991, ISBN 978-1-84342-410-9.
- Edward M. Spiers, The Army and Society 1815–1914, London: Longmans, 1980, ISBN 0-582-48565-7.
- Philip Talbot, 'The English Yeomanry in the Nineteenth Century and the Great Boer War', Journal of the Society for Army Historical Research, Vol 79, No 317 (Spring 2001), pp. 45–62.
- War Office, A List of the Officers of the Militia, the Gentlemen & Yeomanry Cavalry, and Volunteer Infantry of the United Kingdom, 11th Edn, London: War Office, 14 October 1805/Uckfield: Naval and Military Press, 2005, ISBN 978-1-84574-207-2.
- Maj C.H. Dudley Ward, The 74th (Yeomanry) Division in Syria and France, London: John Murray, 1922/Uckfield: Naval & Military Press, 2004, ISBN 1-843428-71-7.

=== External links ===
- Anglo Boer War
- The Drill Hall Project
- Great War Centenary Drill Halls.
- Chris Baker, The Long, Long Trail
- Land Forces of Britain, the Empire and Commonwealth – Regiments.org (archive site)
- Roll of Honour
