= Denbighshire Hussars =

Former British Army Yeomanry regiment

- Active: 23 May 1794 – Present
- Country: Kingdom of Great Britain (1794–1800); United Kingdom (1801–present)
- Branch: British Army
- Type: Yeomanry
- Role: Yeomanry Cavalry; Infantry; Bicycle infantry Medium artillery
- Size: Up to three Regiments
- Engagements: Second Boer War; World War I Egypt 1916–17 Palestine 1917–18 France and Flanders 1918 World War II North-West Europe 1940 '44–45 North Africa 1942–43 Italy 1943–45
- Battle honours: See battle honours below

Commanders
- Notable commanders: Col Sir Watkin Williams-Wynn, 5th Baronet

The Denbighshire Hussars was a Welsh Yeomanry regiment of the British Army formed in 1794. It saw service in the First World War before being converted into a unit of the Royal Artillery. The lineage has been continued by 398 (Flint & Denbighshire Yeomanry) Squadron, Royal Logistic Corps.

== French Revolutionary and Napoleonic Wars ==
After Britain was drawn into the French Revolutionary Wars, the government of Prime Minister William Pitt the Younger proposed on 14 March 1794 that the counties should form Corps of Yeomanry Cavalry that could be called on by the King to defend the country against invasion or by the Lord Lieutenant to subdue any civil disorder within the county. A Troop of Gentlemen and Yeoman of Wrexham, also known as the Wrexham Troop, was formed on 23 May 1795 at Wrexham, a rapidly growing industrial town in Denbighshire, North Wales. Another troop of Denbigh Cavalry under the command of Captain Richard Lloyd was raised at the town of Denbigh on 4 July 1799. In 1803, when the short-lived Peace of Amiens broke down and the Napoleonic Wars began, two more troops were raised at Wrexham and the force there became a regiment as the Wrexham Yeomanry Cavalry on 29 July 1803, under Major-Commandant Sir Foster Cunliffe, 3rd Baronet.

== 19th century ==
By 26 January 1820, when the regiment became the Denbighshire Yeomanry Cavalry, there were five troops under Colonel-Commandant Sir Watkin Williams-Wynn, 5th Baronet. Although the Yeomanry generally declined in importance and numbers after the end of the French wars, the Denbigh regiment was sometimes called out to suppress riots in the 1820s and 1830s. When Government support for the Yeomanry was withdrawn in 1828 the regiment carried on without pay until 1831 when pay for drills and periods of service was restored.

The regiment was used to quell a disturbance by colliery workers in Rhosllannerchrugog in 1830: the miners were angered by the truck shop system that forced them to spend their wages in shops owned by their employers and planned to destroy a truck shop owned by the British Ironworks Company. The regiment was ordered out on patrol under Sir Watkin Williams-Wynn to 'terrify the mob'. Their presence quieted matters and Williams Wynn and the civil officers persuaded the demonstrators to disperse. On their return march the Yeomanry passed Cinder Hill, a pile of blast furnace waste from which thousands of people were watching. A youth threw a piece of cinder, which hit one of the horses, whose rider and another man fired their pistols – luckily hitting no-one. Williams-Wynn and his officers immediately stopped their men from reacting further, but the 'Battle of Cinder Hill', became notorious. In 1831 the Denbighshire miners were still dissatisfied, and marched on Shrewsbury, being turned back by the Shropshire Yeomanry. Later they gathered at Acrefair and again the Denbighshire Yeomanry were called out under Williams-Wynn, who advised the masters and workers to negotiate.

When Col Sir Watkin Williams Wynn retired, he was succeeded on 1 March 1838 as Major-Commandant by Sir William Lloyd, a former major in the Honourable East India Company's army, who had seen action at the Battle of Seetabuldee and Siege of Nagpore. Lloyd joined the regiment after his return to Wales and as a captain in December 1830 had played a prominent role in defusing the difficult situation at 'Cinder Hill'. In 1850 the regiment consisted of three troops of 44 men each, with Regimental Headquarters (RHQ) at Wrexham.

Sir William Lloyd died on 16 May 1857 and Lieutenant-Colonel Charles John Tottenham of Plas Berwyn (late of the 2nd Life Guards and High Sheriff of Denbighshire) was appointed to the command on 12 June 1857. He was simultaneously CO of the Royal Merioneth Militia. In the 1860s, most of the regiment's officers were former officers in the 1st or 2nd Life Guards. Tottenham held the Yeomanry command until he retired and became the regiment's Honorary Colonel on 30 May 1874. He was succeeded as CO by Lt-Col Tom Naylor-Leyland of Nantclwyd Hall, Ruthin (also late of the 2nd LG). The regimental headquarters was at Llangollen, moving to Ruthin in the 1870s. The Regiment became the Denbighshire (Hussars) Yeomanry Cavalry in 1876.

Following the Cardwell Reforms a mobilisation scheme began to appear in the Army List from December 1875. This assigned Regular Army and Yeomanry units places in an order of battle of corps, divisions and brigades for the 'Active Army', even though these formations were entirely theoretical, with no staff or services assigned. The Denbighshire, Derbyshire and Worcestershire Yeomanry were assigned to the Cavalry Brigade of VI Corps based at Crewe, alongside a Regular Royal Horse Artillery battery. This was never more than a paper organisation, but from April 1893 the Army List showed the Yeomanry regiments grouped into brigades for collective training. They were commanded by the senior regimental commanding officer but they did have a Regular Army Brigade major. The Denbighshire Hussars together with the Montgomeryshire Yeomanry formed the 15th Yeomanry Brigade.

In 1885 Capt Sydney Platt began recruiting for the Denbighshire Hussars in neighbouring Caernarfonshire, which had no yeomanry.

== Imperial Yeomanry ==
=== Second Boer War ===
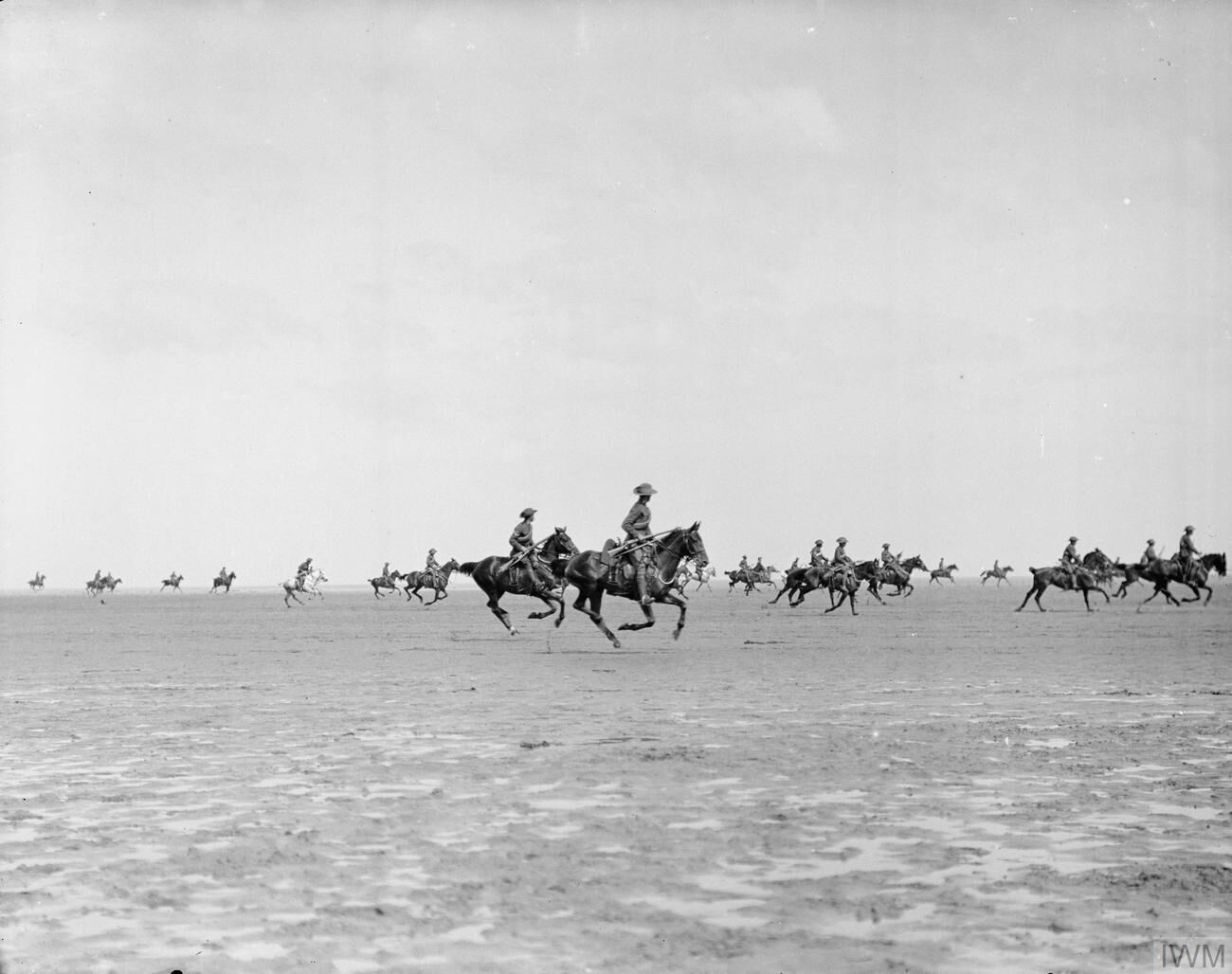
Imperial Yeomanry galloping over a plain during the Second Boer War

The Yeomanry was not intended to serve overseas, but following a string of defeats during Black Week in early December 1899, the British government realised that it would need more troops than just the regular army to fight the Second Boer War, particularly mounted troops. On 13 December, the War Office decided to allow volunteer forces to serve in the field, and a Royal Warrant was issued on 24 December that officially created the Imperial Yeomanry (IY). The Royal Warrant asked standing Yeomanry regiments to provide service companies of approximately 115 men each. In addition to this, many British citizens (usually mid-upper class) volunteered to join the new force.

The Denbighshire Hussars raised the 29th (Denbighshire) Company for the IY, which arrived in South Africa on 5 March 1900 and served with other Welsh companies in 9th Battalion, IY. The company served until 1901, earning the regiment its first Battle honour: South Africa 1900–01.

=== Denbighshire Imperial Yeomanry ===
The Imperial Yeomanry were trained and equipped as Mounted infantry. The concept was considered a success and the existing Yeomanry regiments at home were converted into Imperial Yeomanry in 1901, with an establishment of RHQ and four squadrons with a machine gun section. This included the Denbighshire Hussars Imperial Yeomanry (DHIY), with RHQ at Denbigh. The new establishment represented almost a trebling of the regiment's strength, which allowed the raising of C (Carnarvon) Squadron, recruited by Capt Eric Platt in Caernarfonshire, including a troop from Anglesey, and allocating D Squadron to Cheshire. The Yeomanry Brigade system was abolished at the same time.

C (Carnarvon) Sqn was represented at the 1901 regimental training at Ruabon, and was well enough organised and trained to provide mounted escorts for a visit to the county in May 1902 by the Prince and Princess of Wales. It was organised as follows:

- Squadron HQ: Bangor
  - No 1 Troop: Bangor
  - No 2 Troop: Anglesey (Beaumaris and Amlwch)
  - No 3 Troop: Caernarfon and Llandudno
  - No 4 Troop: Porthmadog and Llanrwst

D Squadron was based at Birkenhead in Cheshire.

A.G. Edwards, Bishop of St Asaph, was appointed the Honorary Chaplain of the regiment on 2 August 1902, attaining the rank of Chaplain 1st Class (TF) in 1906.

== Territorial Force ==
The Imperial Yeomanry were subsumed into the new Territorial Force (TF) under the Haldane Reforms of 1908. and the regiment was officially titled the Denbighshire Yeomanry (Hussars) with the following organisation:

- RHQ at 1 Erdigg Road, Wrexham
- A Squadron at Wrexham, with detachments at Market Street, Llangollen, Earl Street, Mold, Flintshire and Ruabon
- B Squadron at Love Lane, Denbigh, with detachments at Prestatyn, John Street, Rhyl, and Denbigh Road, Ruthin
- C Squadron at Glynne Road, Bangor, with detachments at Caernarvon, Argyll Road, Llandudno and Beaumaris
- D Squadron at 24 Clifon Road, Tranmere, Birkenhead, Cheshire

The regiment formed part of the TF's Welsh Border Mounted Brigade.

In 1911 the Regiment had the honour of being the escort to the Prince of Wales to his Investiture at Caernarfon Castle.

== World War I ==
=== Mobilisation ===
When war was declared on 4 August 1914, the Denbighshire Hussars mobilised at their drill halls under the command of Lt-Col H.P. Sykes, a retired RegularArmy captain who had been in command since 21 December 1910. The regiment assembled with the WBMB and then went with it to its war stations in East Anglia.

In accordance with the Territorial and Reserve Forces Act 1907 (7 Edw. 7, c.9) which brought the TF into being, it was intended to be a home defence force for service during wartime and members could not be compelled to serve outside the country. However, on 10 August 1914 the TF was invited to volunteer for overseas service. On 15 August the War Office issued instructions to separate those men who had signed up for Home Service only, and form these into reserve units. On 31 August, the formation of a reserve or 2nd Line unit was authorised for each 1st Line unit where 60 per cent or more of the men had volunteered for Overseas Service. The titles of these 2nd Line units would be the same as the original, but distinguished by a '2/' prefix. In this way duplicate battalions, brigades and divisions were created, mirroring those TF formations being sent overseas. Later, the 2nd Line was prepared for overseas service and a 3rd Line was formed to act as a reserve, providing trained replacements for the 1st and 2nd Line regiments.

=== 1/1st Denbighshire Hussars ===
The 1/1st Welsh Border Mounted Brigade joined the 1st Mounted Division in September 1914. It was stationed around Bungay, moving to Beccles in February 1915. The brigade was dismounted in November 1915 and thereafter the regiments acted as infantry. Early in 1916 the 1/1st Welsh Border and 1/1st South Wales Mounted Brigade left 1st Mounted Division and were sent to Egypt, disembarking at Alexandria on 15 March. As soon as they arrived, on 20 March, they were amalgamated to form the 4th Dismounted Brigade.

At first this brigade was placed in the Suez Canal defences under 53rd (Welsh) Division, with 1/1st Denbighshire Hussars at Moghara, but in April it came under the command of Western Frontier Force (WFF).

The brigade was with the Suez Canal Defences when, on 14 January 1917, Egyptian Expeditionary Force (EEF) Order No. 26 instructed that the 2nd, 3rd and 4th Dismounted Brigades be reorganised as the 229th, 230th and 231st Infantry Brigades. On 23 February, the General Officer Commanding the EEF, Lieutenant-General Sir A.J. Murray, sought permission from the War Office to form the 229th, 230th and 231st Brigades into a new division. On 25 February, the War Office granted permission and the new 74th (Yeomanry) Division started to form. The 231st Brigade joined the division at Khan Yunis on the border of Palestine on 10 April.

=== 24th (Denbighshire Yeomanry) Battalion, Royal Welch Fusiliers ===
Meanwhile in February 1917 the dismounted Yeomanry regiments comprising the new division were converted into numbered battalions of an infantry regiment recruiting from the same area. Thus on 1 March 1/1st Denbighshire Hussars became 24th (Denbighshire Yeomanry) Battalion of the Royal Welch Fusiliers.

74th (Y) Division took part in the Sinai and Palestine campaign in 1917–18. It was in reserve for the Second Battle of Gaza (17–19 April 1917) and then saw action at the Third Battle of Gaza (27 October–7 November) including the Capture of Beersheba (31 October), where 24th RWF led the attack on the Turkish positions, and the Capture of the Sheria feature (6 November). It took part in the Capture of Jerusalem (8–9 December) and its subsequent defence (27–30 December). Early in 1918 it fought in the Battle of Tell 'Asur (8–12 March).

The German spring offensive in March 1918 led to an urgent call for the EEF to supply reinforcements for the British Expeditionary Force (BEF) on the Western Front,. On 3 April 1918, 74th (Y) Division was warned that it would move to France and by 30 April 1918 had completed embarkation at Alexandria. 24th RWF landed at Marseille in early May. The division then began training for the battle conditions of the Western Front.

Due to a lack of replacements, British (Note: As distinct from the Australian, Canadian and the New Zealand divisions which remained on a 12-battalion basis.) infantry divisions on the Western Front had been reduced from 12 to nine battalions at the beginning of 1918. To conform with this new structure, one battalion left each brigade of 74th (Y) Division, 24th RWF being the battalion selected from 231st Bde. (Note: The others being the 12th (Ayrshire and Lanarkshire Yeomanry) Battalion, Royal Scots Fusiliers of 229th Brigade, and the 12th (Norfolk Yeomanry) Battalion, Norfolk Regiment of 230th Brigade.) On 21 June the three battalions were used to reconstitute 94th Brigade of 31st Division, which was renamed the 94th (Yeomanry) Brigade on that date.

The battalion remained with 94th (Y) Bde in 31st Division for the rest of the war, taking part in the Action of Le Becque (28 June), the Capture of Vieux-Berquin (13 August) and the Final Advance in Flanders, including the Fifth Battle of Ypres (28 September–2 October) and the Action at Tieghem (31 October). After a period in reserve, the division was pushing forward through Belgium from Avelghem to Renaix when the Armistice with Germany came into force on 11 November.

24th (Denbigh Yeomanry) Battalion, Royal Welch Fusiliers, was demobilised in 1919.

=== 2/1st Denbighshire Hussars ===
The 2nd Line regiment was formed in September 1914 and joined the 2/1st Welsh Border Mounted Brigade in the Newcastle area of Northumberland in January 1915. In November 1915 it moved into Yorkshire (Note: The rest of the brigade consisting of the 2/1st Shropshire Yeomanry and the 2/1st Cheshire Yeomanry.) The brigade was placed under the command of the 63rd (2nd Northumbrian) Division. On 31 March 1916, the remaining Mounted Brigades were ordered to be numbered in a single sequence and the brigade became 17th Mounted Brigade, still in Northumberland under Northern Command.

In April 1916, it left 63rd (2nd N) Division and moved with its brigade to East Anglia where it joined the 1st Mounted Division, replacing its 1st Line, which had left (dismounted) for Egypt. By July it had moved with its brigade to the Morpeth, Northumberland area.

In July 1916 there was a major reorganisation of 2nd Line yeomanry units in the United Kingdom. All but 12 regiments were converted to cyclists and as a consequence the regiment was dismounted and the brigade converted to 10th Cyclist Brigade in 1st Cyclist Division (the former 1st Mounted Division). Further reorganisation in October and November 1916 saw the division broken up and the brigade redesignated as 6th Cyclist Brigade in November, still in the Morpeth area.

At this time the regiment departed for the 1st Cyclist Brigade at Beccles in Suffolk where it was amalgamated with the 2/1st Montgomeryshire Yeomanry as the 3rd (Denbigh and Montgomery) Yeomanry Cyclist Battalion. (Note: James also names the combined unit as 3rd (Denbigh and Montgomery) Yeomanry Cyclist Battalion which seems more plausible than 3rd (Montgomery and Denbigh Yeomanry) Cyclist Battalion given that the Denbighshire Hussars were ranked 16th in the Yeomanry order of precedence whereas the Montgomeryshire Yeomanry were ranked 35th.) The regiment resumed its separate identity as 2/1st Denbighshire Hussars in March 1917. It moved to Worlingham (near Beccles) in July, to Aldeburgh in January 1918 and back to Worlingham in April. The battalion disbanded at Beccles on 29 October 1918.

=== 3/1st Denbighshire Hussars ===
The 3rd Line regiment was formed in 1915 and in the summer it was affiliated to a Reserve Cavalry Regiment at The Curragh. In the summer of 1916 it was dismounted and attached to the 3rd Line Groups of the 55th (West Lancashire) Division as its 1st Line was serving as infantry. The regiment was disbanded in about February 1917 with the personnel transferring to the 2/1st Denbighshire Hussars or to the 4th (Reserve) Battalion of the Royal Welsh Fusiliers at Oswestry.

== Interwar ==
Royal Artillery cap badge, worn 1922–1949

The Denbighshire Hussars reformed at Wrexham when the TF was reconstituted on 7 February 1920. Postwar, a commission was set up to consider the shape of the TF (Territorial Army (TA) from 1 October 1921). Wartime experience showed that the army had too many mounted units, and so only the 14 most senior Yeomanry regiments were retained in the TA as horsed cavalry, the remainder being converted to other roles, (Note: The Lovat Scouts and Scottish Horse remained mounted as "scouts"; eight regiments were converted to Armoured Car Companies of the Royal Tank Corps, one was absorbed into a local infantry battalion, one became a signals unit and two were disbanded. The remainder were converted to artillery.) mainly as artillery. On 1 March 1922 the Denbighshire Hussars were converted to artillery and merged with 61st Medium Brigade, Royal Garrison Artillery (RGA). This had been reformed in 1920 from the prewar Welsh (Carnarvonshire) Heavy Battery (Note: The contemporary spelling in all formal documents was 'Carnarvon', not 'Caernarvon', or today's preferred 'Caernarfon'.) as 12th (Carnarvon and Denbigh) Medium Brigade', (Note: In contemporary RA usage a brigade was a lieutenant-colonel's command consisting of batteries 'brigaded' together; it was not comparable with an infantry or cavalry brigade commanded by a brigadier-general. In the Territorials, unlike the Regulars, unit heritage is carried by the brigade/regiment, rather than the battery.) in the TF and then renumbered in the TA. The merged unit became the 61st Carnarvon and Denbigh (Yeomanry) Medium Brigade, RGA (Note: This is the form of the title given in the Army List; other usually authoritative sources such Frederick and Litchfield render it as '61st (Carnarvon & Denbigh Yeomanry)'.) with the following organisation:

- Brigade HQ at Drill Hall, Colwyn Bay, from Denbighshire Hussars
- 241st (Carnarvon) Med Bty at Bangor, from 61st Medium Bde
- 242nd (Carnarvon) Med Bty (Howitzer) at Llandudo, from Denbighshire Hussars
- 243rd (Denbigh) Med Bty (H) at Colwyn Bay, from Denbighshire Hussars
- 244th (Denbigh) Med Bty (H) at Wrexham from Denbighshire Hussars

No prewar officers of the Denbigh Yeomanry were carried over to the new brigade. On 1 June 1924 the RGA was subsumed into the Royal Artillery (RA) and the unit titles were adjusted. The brigade was defined as 'Army Troops' in 53rd (Welsh) Divisional Area.

In 1938 the RA modernised its nomenclature and a lieutenant-colonel's command was designated a 'regiment' rather than a 'brigade'; this applied to TA brigades from 1 November 1938. The TA was doubled in size after the Munich Crisis, and most regiments formed duplicates. During 1939 61st (C&DY) Med Rgt divided as follows:

61st (Carnarvon & Denbighshire) Medium Regiment

- Regimental HQ at Colwn Bay
- 242 (Carnarvon) Med Battery at Llandudno
- 243 (Denbigh) Med Battery at Colwyn Bay

69th Medium Regiment

- RHQ at Bangor
- 241 (Carnarvon) Med Battery at Bangor
- 244 (Denbigh) Med Battery at Wrexham

== World War II ==
=== 61st Carnarvon & Denbigh (Yeomanry) Medium Regiment ===
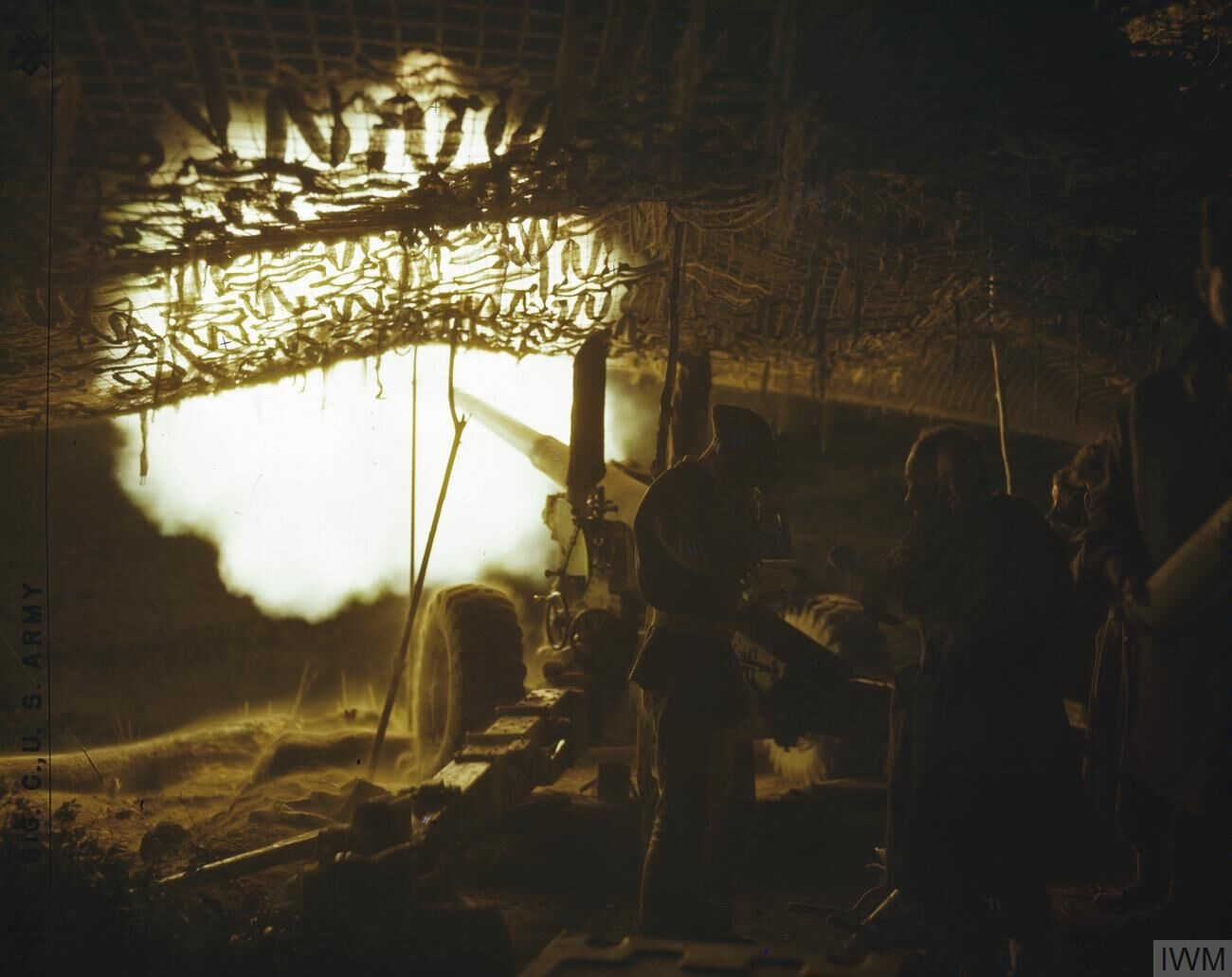
4.5-inch gun of 69th (Caernarvon & Denbigh Yeomanry) Med Rgt firing at the crossing of Garigliano River in Italy, 17/18 January 1944

61st (C&DY) Medium Regiment deployed to France with the British Expeditionary Force during the Phoney war. After the German invasion of the Low Countries in May 1940 it played a distinguished part in the Battle of France before being evacuated from Dunkirk with the loss of all its equipment. After three years in home defence it was assigned to 21st Army Group for the Allied invasion of Normandy. Equipped with the 5.5-inch gun, the regiment landed in Normandy on 2 July 1944 as part of 8th Army Group Royal Artillery (8th AGRA) and fought with it through the remainder of the Normandy Campaign, including Operations Jupiter, Greenline and Bluecoat.

The regiment continued with 8th AGRA through the subsequent campaign in North West Europe, culminating in the crossing of the Rhine (Operation Plunder) in March 1945. The regiment entered suspended animation in British Army of the Rhine (BAOR) 1–13 March 1946.

=== 69th Carnarvon & Denbigh (Yeomanry) Medium Regiment ===
The duplicate unit also saw action in the Battle of France before being evacuated from Dunkirk. On 17 February 1942 it was authorised to use its parent regiment's subtitle. Later that year it was sent to Western Desert, where it took part in the Second Battle of El Alamein. It joined the 2nd Army Group Royal Artillery and took part in the Italian Campaign from 1943 to 1945. It ended the war in North-West Europe with the 2nd Army. The regiment passed into suspended animation in BAOR 1–17 March 1946.

== Postwar ==
When the TA was reconstituted on 1 January 1947, 69th Med Rgt was formally disbanded and 61st Med Rgt reformed as 361 (Carnarvon, and Denbigh Yeomanry) Medium Regiment (Note: The positioning of the comma in the subtitle was significant: it recognised that the original Caernarfonshire component had been artillery and not yeomanry.) at Colwyn Bay. The CO was Lt-Col Owen Williams-Wynn, son of the regiment's Honorary Colonel and himself the former adjutant of the regiment 1936–39.

On 31 October 1956 the regiment merged with 384th (Royal Welch Fusiliers) Light Regiment to become 372 (Flintshire, and Denbighshire Yeomanry) Regiment. (Note: The positioning of the comma in the title is important: the Flintshires were never Yeomanry.)

When the TA was reduced into the Territorial and Army Volunteer Reserve (TAVR) on 2 April 1967, the regiment became The Flintshire, and Denbighshire Yeomanry, Royal Artillery (Territorial):

- RHQ at Prestatyn
- P (Flintshire) Battery at Holywell
- Q (Denbighshire) Battery at Colwyn Bay

[further reductions] On 1 April 1969 the regiment was reduced to a cadre at Prestatyn under 119 Independent Light Reconnaissance Platoon, Royal Electrical and Mechanical Engineers (REME); some HQ personnel were absorbed into a platoon of A Company, Welsh Volunteers detached at Prestatyn, and others into the REME platoon; others from Q Bty were absorbed into a platoon of A Co Welsh Volunteers detached to Colwyn Bay.

Finally, on 1 April 1971 the cadre was disbanded to reform as infantry, finding B (Flintshire and Denbighshire Yeomanry) Company in 3rd (Volunteer) Battalion, Royal Welsh Fusiliers. The Denbighshire Yeomanry lineage was discontinued from 1999 but on 1 April 2014 a new 398 (Flintshire & Denbighshire Yeomanry) Transport Squadron, Royal Logistic Corps, was formed in the Army Reserve. It took on a new primary role as Drivers within 157 (Welsh) Regiment RLC. They have other secondary duties and can be trained as ammunition technicians, logistic specialists, logistic communications specialists and chefs among other trades open to all with the RLC.

== Heritage and ceremonial ==
=== Uniforms and insignia ===
From the beginning the regiment wore a blue jacket with three vertical rows of silver buttons; there may have been lace loops across the front, but they had gone by 1820. A Tarleton helmet was worn from 1795, being replaced by a black japanned Romanesque helmet with bearskin crest by 1831. The crest was replaced by a flowing red plume in 1840. By 1850 the jacket had scarlet facings and the badge was the Prince of Wales's feathers, coronet and 'Ich Dien' motto. In 1856 the regiment adopted a Hussar uniform with six white loops across the front and a black Dragoon helmet with red plume. In 1862 the helmet was replaced by a Hussar busby with scarlet bag and white plume. Collars, cuffs and trouser stripes were also scarlet.

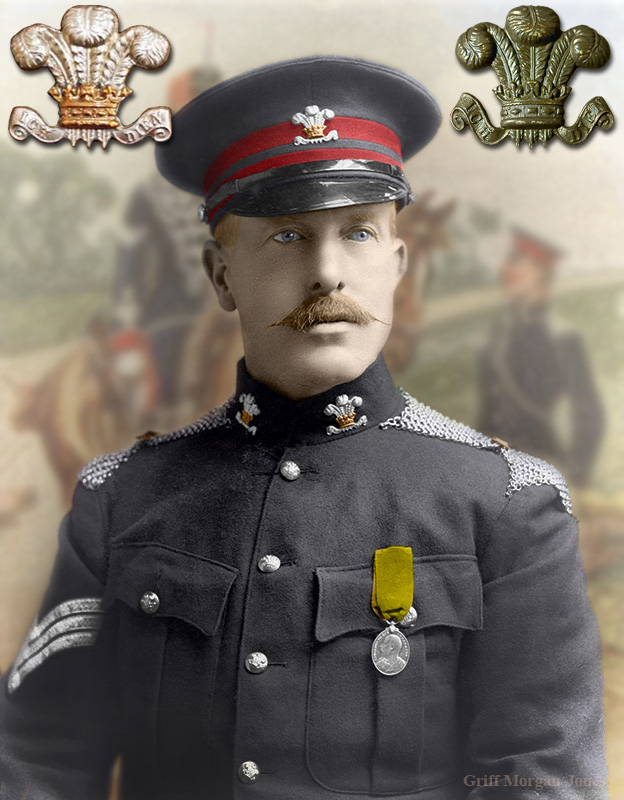
Denbighshire Hussars Sergeant, wearing the Imperial Yeomanry Long Service Medal, 1907

The full dress uniform of the Denbighshire Hussars Imperial Yeomanry reflected the Boer War experience of the IY alongside Colonial units. The head dress was a drab felt Slouch hat with a scarlet pagri and white feather Hackle; the left side was turned up and displayed the regimental cap badge. For ordinary wear a drab Field service cap with scarlet piping was worn, officers also having a drab Peaked cap with scarlet top and band. The double-breasted drab tunic with scarlet collar and shoulder-straps had a lancer-style scarlet plastron front for full dress. The brass cap and collar badges from 1901 consisted of the Prince of Wales's insignia, the officers' cap badge in gilt or silver having the addition of a scroll underneath inscribed 'DENBIGHSHIRE HUSSARS'. Brass 'D.H.I.Y.' shoulder-titles were worn.

By 1908 the regiment had reverted to the blue hussar uniform for full dress, but many yeomanry regiments wore a less elaborate parade dress comprising a blue patrol jacket and peaked cap (see picture), In other orders of dress the standard khaki cavalry uniform was worn.

In 1949 361 Med Rgt replaced the Royal Artillery 'gun' badge with one of their own design. It comprised the Prince of Wales's insignia above a scroll inscribed 'CAERNARVON & DENBIGH YEO'. The feathers and motto were in white metal and the coronet and scroll in gilt. RA 'bomb' collar badges' continued to be worn.

=== Honorary Colonels ===
The following served as Honorary Colonel of the unit:

- Charles John Tottenham, former CO, appointed 30 May 1874
- Arthur Mesham, former CO, appointed 20 February 1892
- Sir Watkin Williams-Wynn, 9th Baronet, KCB, DSO, TD, appointed 7 February 1923
- Sir Watkin Williams-Wynn, 10th Baronet, former CO of 361 Medium Rgt 1947–52, appointed 1952

=== Memorials ===
There is a memorial to the 17 men of 29th (Denbighshire) Company Imperial Yeomanry who died on active service during the Second Boer War inside St Giles' Church in Wrexham.

A regimental memorial to the Denbighshire Hussars, commemorating the regiment from raising in 1796 to the end of its cavalry incarnation in 1920 and listing its battle honours, is near the north door of the nave of St Asaph Cathedral.

=== Battle honours ===
The Denbighshire Yeomanry was awarded the following battle honours (honours in bold are emblazoned on the guidon):

Second Boer War	**South Africa 1900–01**
First World War	**Somme 1918**, **Bapaume 1918**, **Ypres 1918**, **France and Flanders 1918**, **Egypt 1916–17**, **Gaza**, **Jerusalem**, **Jericho**, **Tell 'Asur**, **Palestine 1917–18**
Second World War	The Royal Artillery was present in nearly all battles and would have earned most of the honours awarded to cavalry and infantry regiments. In 1833, William IV awarded the motto Ubique (meaning "everywhere") in place of all battle honours.

== See also ==
- Imperial Yeomanry
- List of Yeomanry Regiments 1908
- Yeomanry
- Yeomanry order of precedence
- British yeomanry during the First World War
- Second line yeomanry regiments of the British Army
- List of British Army Yeomanry Regiments converted to Royal Artillery

== Bibliography ==
- L.S. Amery (ed), The Times History of the War in South Africa 1899-1902, London: Sampson Low, Marston, 6 Vols 1900–09; Appendix to Chapters I-XIV, pp. 503–514.
- Anon, British Army of the Rhine Battlefield Tour: Operation Bluecoat, Germany: BAOR, 1947/Uckfield: Naval and Military Press, 2021, ISBN 978-1-78331-812-4.
- Anon, British Army of the Rhine Battlefield Tour: Operation Plunder, Germany: BAOR, 1947/Uckfield: Naval and Military Press, 2022, ISBN 978-1-4745-3532-8.
- Maj A.F. Becke,History of the Great War: Order of Battle of Divisions, Part 2a: The Territorial Force Mounted Divisions and the 1st-Line Territorial Force Divisions (42–56), London: HM Stationery Office, 1935/Uckfield: Naval & Military Press, 2007, ISBN 1-847347-39-8.
- Maj A.F. Becke,History of the Great War: Order of Battle of Divisions, Part 2b: The 2nd-Line Territorial Force Divisions (57th–69th), with the Home-Service Divisions (71st–73rd) and 74th and 75th Divisions, London: HM Stationery Office, 1937/Uckfield: Naval & Military Press, 2007, ISBN 1-847347-39-8.
- Maj A.F. Becke,History of the Great War: Order of Battle of Divisions, Part 3b: New Army Divisions (30–41) and 63rd (R.N.) Division, London: HM Stationery Office, 1939/Uckfield: Naval & Military Press, 2007, ISBN 1-847347-41-X.
- Burke's Peerage, Baronetage and Knightage, 100th Edn, London, 1953.
- Col John K. Dunlop, The Development of the British Army 1899–1914, London: Methuen, 1938.
- Maj L.F. Ellis, History of the Second World War, United Kingdom Military Series: The War in France and Flanders 1939–1940, London: HM Stationery Office, 1954/Uckfield: Naval & Military, 2004, 978-1-85457-056-6.
- Gen Sir Martin Farndale, History of the Royal Regiment of Artillery: The Years of Defeat: Europe and North Africa, 1939–1941, Woolwich: Royal Artillery Institution, 1988/London: Brasseys, 1996, ISBN 1-85753-080-2.
- J.B.M. Frederick, Lineage Book of British Land Forces 1660–1978, Vol I, Wakefield: Microform Academic, 1984, ISBN 1-85117-007-3.
- J.B.M. Frederick, Lineage Book of British Land Forces 1660–1978, Vol II, Wakefield: Microform Academic, 1984, ISBN 1-85117-009-X.
- Haythornthwaite, Philip J. (1996). The World War One Source Book. London: Arms and Armour Press. ISBN 1-85409-351-7.
- Brig E.A. James, British Regiments 1914–18, London: Samson Books, 1978, ISBN 0-906304-03-2/Uckfield: Naval & Military Press, 2001, ISBN 978-1-84342-197-9.
- Steven John, Welsh Yeomanry at War: A History of the 24th (Pembroke & Glamorgan Yeomanry) Battalion, The Welsh Regiment, Barnsley: Pen & Sword, 2016, ISBN 978-1-47383-362-3.
- Lt-Col H.F. Joslen, Orders of Battle, United Kingdom and Colonial Formations and Units in the Second World War, 1939–1945, London: HM Stationery Office, 1960/London: London Stamp Exchange, 1990, ISBN 0-948130-03-2/Uckfield: Naval & Military Press, 2003, ISBN 1-843424-74-6.
- N.B. Leslie, Battle Honours of the British and Indian Armies 1695–1914, London: Leo Cooper, 1970, ISBN 0-85052-004-5.
- Norman E.H. Litchfield, The Territorial Artillery 1908–1988 (Their Lineage, Uniforms and Badges), Nottingham: Sherwood Press, 1992, ISBN 0-9508205-2-0.
- Mileham, Patrick (1994). The Yeomanry Regiments; 200 Years of Tradition. Edinburgh: Canongate Academic. ISBN 1-898410-36-4.
- Bryn Owen, History of the Welsh Militia and Volunteer Corps 1757–1908: 1: Anglesey and Caernarfonshire, Caernarfon: Palace Books, 1989, ISBN 1-871904-00-5.
- Rinaldi, Richard A (2008). Order of Battle of the British Army 1914. Ravi Rikhye. ISBN 978-0-9776072-8-0.
- Col H.C.B. Rogers, The Mounted Troops of the British Army 1066–1945, London: Seeley Service, 1959.
- Lt-Col Ernest Ryan, 'Arms, Uniforms and Equipment of the Yeomanry Cavalry', Journal of the Society for Army Historical Research, September 1957, Vol 35, pp. 124–133.
- Lt-Col J.D. Sainsbury, The Hertfordshire Yeomanry Regiments, Royal Artillery, Part 1: The Field Regiments 1920-1946, Welwyn: Hertfordshire Yeomanry and Artillery Trust/Hart Books, 1999, ISBN 0-948527-05-6.
- Arthur Sleigh, The Royal Militia and Yeomanry Cavalry Army List, April 1850, London: British Army Despatch Press, 1850/Uckfield: Naval and Military Press, 1991, ISBN 978-1-84342-410-9.
- R.J. Smith & C.R. Coogan, The Uniforms of the British Yeomanry Force 1794–1914, 15: Staffordshire Yeomanry, Feltham: Robert Ogilby Trust/Chippenham: Picton Publishing, 1993, ISBN 0-9515714-6-X.
- Edward M. Spiers, The Army and Society 1815–1914, London: Longmans, 1980, ISBN 0-582-48565-7.
- Philip Talbot, 'The English Yeomanry in the Nineteenth Century and the Great Boer War', Journal of the Society for Army Historical Research, Spring 2001, Vol 79, No 317, pp. 45–62.
- Lt-Col Will Townend & Frank Baldwin, Gunners in Normandy: The History of the Royal Artillery in North-West Europe January 1942 to August 1944, Cheltenham: History Press, 2020, ISBN 978-0-7509-9044-8.
- War Office, A List of the Officers of the Militia, the Gentlemen & Yeomanry Cavalry, and Volunteer Infantry of the United Kingdom, 11th Edn, London: War Office, 14 October 1805/Uckfield: Naval and Military Press, 2005, ISBN 978-1-84574-207-2.
- Maj C.H. Dudley Ward, The 74th (Yeomanry) Division in Syria and France, London: John Murray, 1922/Uckfield: Naval & Military Press, 2004, ISBN 1-843428-71-7.
