= Sir Watkin Williams-Wynn, 10th Baronet =

Welsh baronet and landowner

- Born: 30 November 1904; Wales
- Died: 13 May 1988
- Citizenship: British
- Education: Royal Military Academy, Woolwich
- Occupation: Lieutenant-Colonel
- Employer(s): British Army and Crown
- Title: 10th Baronet of Bodelwyddan
- Children: David Watkin Williams-Wynn

Lt-Col. Sir Owen Watkin Williams-Wynn, 10th Baronet, CBE, KStJ (30 November 1904 – 13 May 1988), was a Welsh soldier and landowner. He was Lord Lieutenant of Denbighshire from 1966 to 1974, then Lord Lieutenant of Clwyd from 1976 to 1979.

== Background and early life ==
Williams-Wynn was the son of Sir Robert William Herbert Watkin Williams-Wynn, 9th Baronet, KCB DSO, who (as his own father had done) employed a Welsh-speaking nanny to ensure that his son would be able to speak Welsh. He was educated at Eton and the Royal Military Academy, Woolwich.

One of the few members of the surviving ancient Welsh nobility, Williams-Wynn was the closest certain heir of the House of Aberffraw, the former ruling family of Gwynedd and Wales, who were deposed in the English Conquest of 1282. The Williams-Wynn baronets were an important family of Denbighshire landowners, whose 17th-century ancestor had married into the Wynn family of Gwydir, the patrilineal descendants of Owain Gwynedd, Prince of Gwynedd (1137–1170), and in time they became the senior surviving branch of his family. On the death of Sir John Wynn in 1719, his heiress Jane Thelwall inherited both the Wynnstay Estate and the Wynn claim to Aberffraw. Her husband Watkin Williams then added the Wynn family name to his own.

== Life and career ==
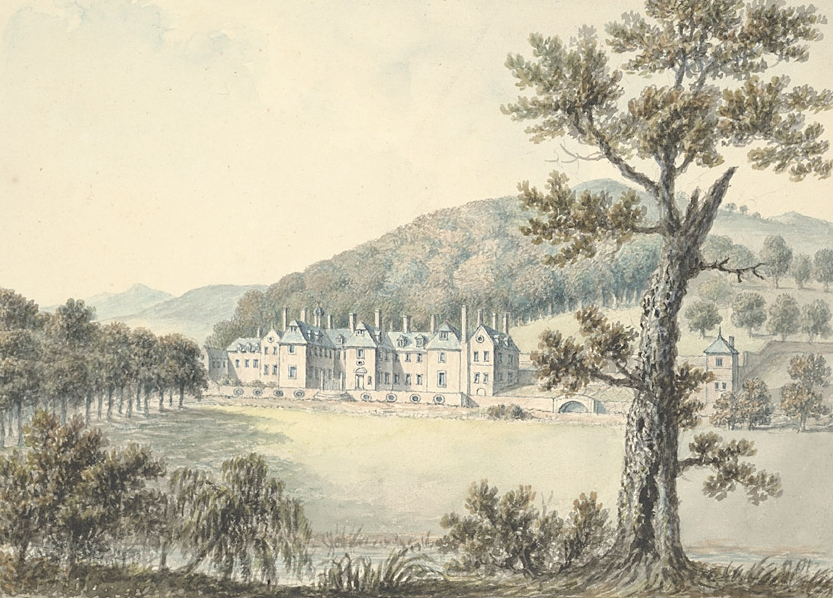
Llangedwyn hall, 1795

In 1925, after graduating from Woolwich, Williams-Wynn was commissioned into the Royal Regiment of Artillery; He served in the Royal Horse Artillery, was an instructor at the Army School of Equitation, Weedon, adjutant of the 61st (Carnarvon and Denbigh Yeomanry) Medium Regiment of the Royal Artillery (Territorial Army), from 1936 to 1940, and was promoted Major in 1940, having been appointed a Justice of the Peace in 1937. He was second in command of his regiment while it was part of the British Expeditionary Force to France and was at the evacuation of Dunkirk, then was posted to the Far East. During service with the 18th Infantry Division at Singapore he was twice mentioned in despatches, and after the fall of Singapore in February 1942 was a prisoner of war of the Imperial Japanese Army on the Burma Railway until the end of the war in 1945.

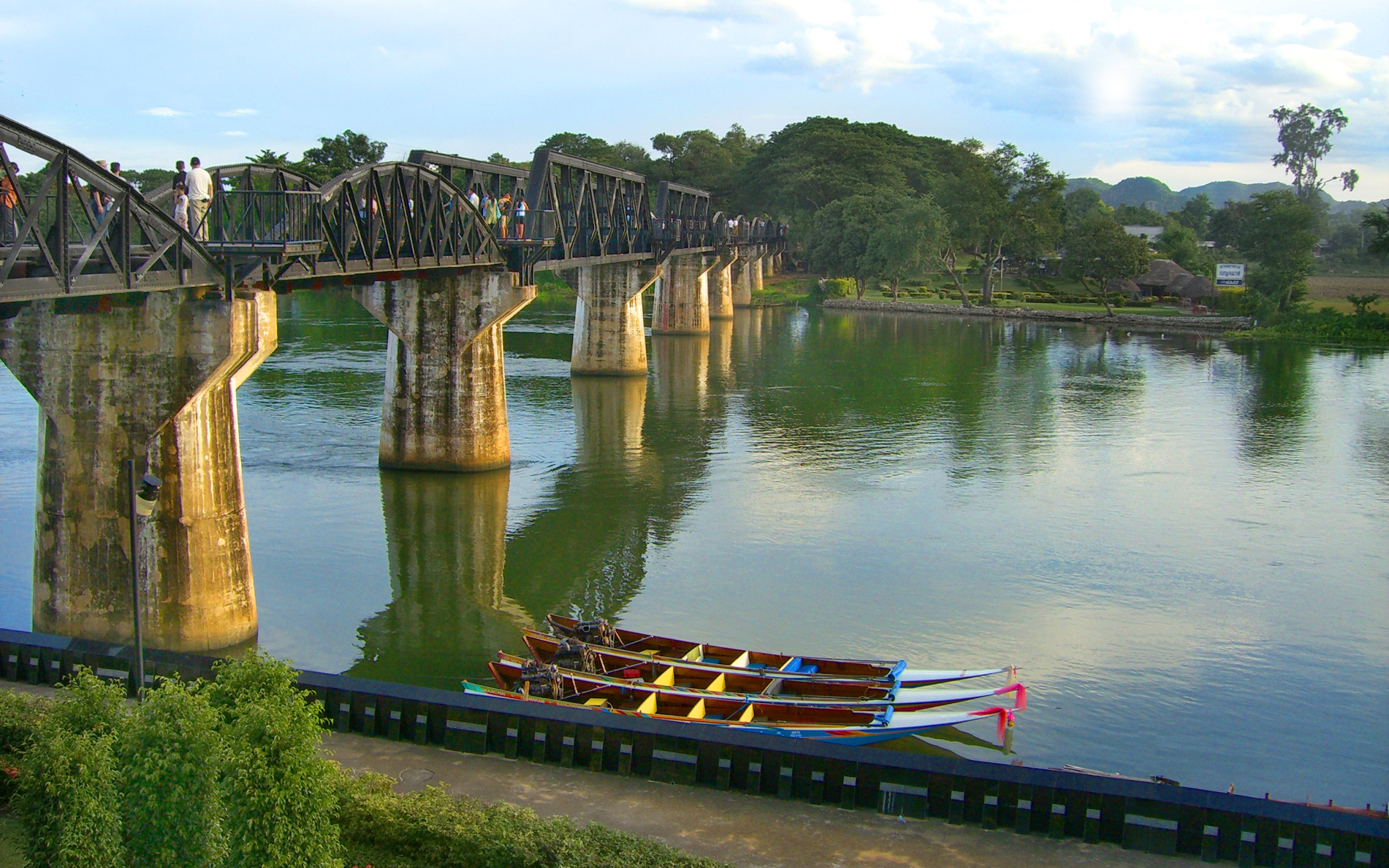
A bridge on the Burma Railway

In 1946 Williams-Wynn was promoted lieutenant colonel and given command of the 361st (Carnarvonshire and Denbigh Yeomanry) Medium Regiment of the Royal Artillery (Territorials), retaining it until 1952, after which he was Honorary Colonel of the Regiment until October 1957. In 1947, he was appointed a Deputy Lieutenant for Denbighshire. On 23 November 1951, on the death of his father, he inherited the Williams-Wynn Baronetcy, and was High Sheriff of Denbighshire in 1954. He was also Master of the Flint and Denbigh Foxhounds from 1946 to 1961 and became Joint Master of his own Sir W. W. Wynn's Hounds in 1957.

From 1961 to 1970 Williams-Wynn was liaison officer to the Ministry of Agriculture for North Wales, and from 1963 to 1966 a member of the Nature Conservancy for Wales. He was a president of the National Eisteddfod of Wales, Vice-Lieutenant of Denbighshire from 1957 to 1966, then Lord Lieutenant from 1966 to 1974. With a reorganisation of Welsh counties in that year, he served as Vice-Lieutenant of Clwyd from 1974 to 1976 and as Lord Lieutenant of Clwyd until 1979, when he retired.

At the time of his death on 13 May 1988, Williams-Wynn was living at Llangedwyn Hall, Powys, in the border country near Oswestry, Shropshire. The ruins of Owain Glyndŵr's Sycharth stand nearby. An obituary in The Times said "He was a countryman to his bones. From his estate at Llangedwyn, South Clwyd, he exercised his wide agricultural and conservationist interests". In his Will, he left an estate valued at £736,062.

== Marriages ==
In 1939, Williams-Wynn married firstly, at Holy Trinity, Brompton, Margaret Jean, the daughter of Colonel William Alleyne Macbean, late Royal Artillery, and the Hon. Mrs Gerald Scarlett, step-daughter of Major General Gerald Scarlett. They were married by William Havard, Bishop of St Asaph. They had two sons, of whom David Watkin was heir to the title and estates.

His wife died in 1961, and in 1968 Williams-Wynn married secondly Gabrielle Haden Matheson, the daughter of Herbert Alexander Caffin.

== Honours ==
- Commander of the Order of the British Empire, 1968
- Knight of the Venerable Order of Saint John, 1972
- Fellow of the Royal Agricultural Society

== Coat of arms ==
Coat of arms of Sir Watkin Williams-Wynn, 10th Baronet
Crest An eagle displayed or. Escutcheon Quarterly, 1st and 4th, Vert three eagles displayed in fesse or (Wynn), 2nd and 3rd, Argent two foxes counter-salient Gules the dexter surmounted of the sinister (Williams). Motto Eryr Eryror Eryri (The eagle of the eagles of Snowdon)

Baronetage of England
Preceded by Watkin Williams-Wynn	Baronet (of Bodelwyddan in Flint, and of Gray's Inn); 1951–1988	Succeeded by Watkin Williams-Wynn
