= Lord Lieutenant of Clwyd =

Welsh county ceremonial officer

This is a list of people who have served as Lord Lieutenant for Clwyd. The office was created on 1 April 1974.

- Brigadier Hugh Salusbury Kynaston Mainwaring, 1 April 1974 – 23 November 1976 (formerly Lord Lieutenant of Flintshire), with a lieutenant:
  - Sir Owen Watkin Williams-Wynn, 10th Baronet 1 April 1974 – 23 November 1976 (formerly Lord Lieutenant of Denbighshire)
- Sir Owen Watkin Williams-Wynn, 10th Baronet 23 November 1976 – 1979
- Col. James Ellis Evans 28 December 1979 – August 1985
- Sir William Gladstone, 7th Baronet August 1985 – 5 June 2001
- Trefor Jones 5 June 2001 – 2012
- Henry George Fetherstonhaugh 2013 – present
