= William Lloyd (mountaineer) =

British army officer, died 1857

Lieutenant-Colonel Sir William Lloyd (29 December 1782 – 16 May 1857) was a Welsh military commander, and was one of the first Europeans to ascend a Himalayan peak.

He was born in Wrexham, the eldest son of Richard Myddleton Massie Lloyd of Plas Power, Bersham, a wealthy mercer (Welsh flannel, linen, wool and cloth dealer) and later, a banker, and Mary Bowey, the daughter of William Bowey (1725–1820), of Chester, Cheshire. He was educated at Ruthin School. In 1798, he obtained a commission in the army of the Honourable East India Company, and landing in India a year later, with the Rank of Lieutenant. He later became Captain in the Bengal Infantry, commanding the Residency Escort at Nagpore for 14 years. In 1814, he inherited the Bryn Estyn estate, Bieston, Wrexham, and other lands and property in Denbighshire, following his father's death, while his brother, Richard Myddleton Massie Lloyd (1794–1860), took over the running of the Wrexham & North Wales Bank, which was set up by his father in Ty Meredith, Chester Street, Wrexham. In 1817, he was wounded four times at the Battle of Seetabuldee, and took part in the Siege of Nagpore in December that year. He had a son, George who was born 17 October 1815 in India, and a daughter, Mary was born 4 January 1817, to an unnamed Indian mother.

In 1822 he began a journey through the Himalayas that took him as far as Buran Ghati on the Tibetan border, where he produced maps for the EIC, which continued to be used by the Indian military for many years. On 13 June, he set off alone and later that day, he became the first European to reach the peak of the Western Hill of Boorendo. In 1829, he became High Sheriff of Denbighshire. During December 1830, in his role as Captain of the Denbighshire Yeomanry Cavalry, William Lloyd played a prominent role in diffusing an ugly situation in Rhosllanerchrugog that had arisen between the striking miners of Cefn, Acrefair, Rhosllanerchrugog and Brymbo, which became known as The Battle of Cinder Hill. In November 1837, Captain William Lloyd played a role in the management of 'The Society for the Diffusion of Useful Knowledge' and was a distinguished member of one of the S. D. U. K's. local committees at Wrexham.

In Queen Victoria's first honours list, he was created a Knight Bachelor on 18 July 1838. Also in 1838, Major Sir William Lloyd was gazetted to the command of the Denbighshire Yeomanry, with the rank of Major Commandant, when Colonel Sir Watkin Williams Wynn retired. In 1840, he published his journals as 'The Narrative of a Journey from Caunpoor to the Boorendo Pass in the Himalayan Mountains Via Gwalior, Agra, Delhi, and Sirhind by Major Sir William Lloyd and Captain Alexander Gerards's Account of an Attempt to Penetrate by Bekhur to Garoo and the Lake Manasarowara: For The Purpose of Determining the Line of Perpetual Snow on the Southern Face of the Himalaya (With Maps)', which was edited by his son, George Lloyd at Bryn Estyn. Following the accidental death of his son in 1843 in Egypt, and the collapse of the family's bank during 1849, Major Sir William Lloyd retired from public life for a few years, spending his time at his villa at Llandudno, 'Plas Trevor'. He died there on 16 May 1857, his body being brought back to Bryn Estyn, before being taken back to Llandudno where he was buried at St Tudno's Churchyard, on the Great Orme, Llandudno.

== Sources ==
- Denbighshire Historical Society Transactions Volumes 25/26 (1976–1977)
