= Jericho, South Africa =

Jericho
- Location within North West (South African province) Location within South Africa
- Coordinates: 25.332°S 27.804°E
- Country: South Africa
- Province: North West
- District: Bojanala Platinum
- Municipality: Madibeng

Area
  - Total: 11.66 km^{2} (4.50 sq mi)

Population (2011)
  - Total: 8,612
  - Density: 738.6/km^{2} (1,913/sq mi)

Racial makeup (2011)
  - Black African: 98.9%
  - Coloured: 0.3%
  - Indian/Asian: 0.4%
  - White: 0.1%
  - Other: 0.2%

First languages (2011)
  - Tswana: 76.0%
  - Tsonga: 8.9%
  - Northern Sotho: 5.0%
  - Zulu: 2.5%
  - Other: 7.6%
- Time zone: UTC+2 (SAST)
- PO box: 0189
- Area code: 012

Jericho (also known as Mmatope-a-Seretsana in Setswana) is a village in Bojanala Platinum District in the North West province of South Africa. It is under the Bakwena ba Mogopa tribal authority.

== Schools ==
- Charles Mmamogale Primary School
- Mmatope Primary School
- Mafale Primary School
- Kwena Ya Madiba High School now known as Madiba A Toloane.
- Obed More Special school
