= Sir Watkin Williams-Wynn, 9th Baronet =

Welsh Lord Lieutenant, baronet, and landowner

- Born: 3 June 1862; Wales
- Died: 23 November 1951 (aged 89)
- Education: Christ Church, Oxford
- Occupation: Colonel
- Employer(s): British Army and Crown
- Title: 9th Baronet, of Bodelwyddan and of Gray's Inn
- Children: Owen Watkin Williams-Wynn

Colonel Sir Robert William Herbert Watkin Williams-Wynn, 9th Baronet, KCB, DSO (3 June 1862 – 23 November 1951) was a Welsh soldier and landowner.

He was Master of the Flint and Denbigh Foxhounds for 58 years and also Lord Lieutenant of Denbighshire from 1928 until his death in 1951.

== Background and early life ==
Williams-Wynn was the son of Colonel Herbert Watkin Williams-Wynn, a younger son of Sir Watkin Williams-Wynn, 5th Baronet, and was educated at Wellington and Christ Church, Oxford.

One of the few members of the surviving ancient Welsh nobility, at the time of his death Williams-Wynn was the closest certain heir of the House of Aberffraw, the former ruling family of Gwynedd and Wales, who were deposed in the English Conquest of 1282. The Williams-Wynn baronets were an important family of Denbighshire landowners, whose 17th-century ancestor had married into the Wynn family of Gwydir, the patrilineal descendants of Owain Gwynedd, Prince of Gwynedd, and in time they became the senior surviving branch of his family. On the death of Sir John Wynn in 1719, his heiress Jane Thelwall inherited both the Wynnstay estate and the Wynn claim to Aberffraw. Her husband Watkin Williams then added the Wynn family name to his own.

== Life and career ==
In 1886, after Oxford, Williams-Wynn joined the Montgomeryshire Yeomanry, and on 13 August 1887, he was promoted to captain. He volunteered for service in the Second Boer War, and was seconded for service in the Imperial Yeomanry on 24 February 1900, where he was appointed a captain in the 31st Company of the 9th Battalion. After arrival in South Africa, he saw active service in the Transvaal and the Orange River Colony and was on the staff of Lord Chesham. He was promoted to major on 14 May 1902. For his service during the war, he was appointed a Companion of the Distinguished Service Order (DSO) in the South Africa Honours list published on 26 June 1902. From 1905 to 1917 he was the colonel commanding the Montgomeryshire Yeomanry and saw further active service in Egypt during the First World War, when he was three times mentioned in dispatches and held two district commands. He was appointed Honorary Colonel of the 61st (Carnarvon & Denbigh Yeomanry) Medium Regiment, Royal Artillery on 7 February 1923.

He stood unsuccessfully for parliament in 1894, 1895, and 1900, as a Conservative in Montgomeryshire.

He was appointed a Companion of the Order of the Bath (CB) in the 1923 Birthday Honours.

In 1928 Williams-Wynn was appointed as Lord Lieutenant of Denbighshire, remaining in post until his death in 1951. He was also a Justice of the Peace for Denbighshire and Flintshire and was Master of the Flint and Denbigh Foxhounds for fifty-eight years, from 1888 to 1946. In 1938 he was knighted by being appointed a Knight Commander of the Order of the Bath (KCB). In 1949, at the age of eighty-seven, he inherited the Williams-Wynn Baronetcy and estates from a cousin, Sir Watkin Williams-Wynn, 8th Baronet, who had died without a surviving son. (The latter's namesake son, Watkin Williams-Wynn, had died while serving as Lieutenant in the 1st Royal Dragoons in 1946.)

== Marriage and children ==
In 1904, Williams-Wynn married Elizabeth Ida Lowther, the daughter of G. W. Lowther, and they had two sons, of whom Owen Watkin was heir to the title and estates, and two daughters.

== Honours ==
- CB : Companion of the Bath 1923
- KCB: Knight Commander of the Order of the Bath 1938
- DSO: Companion of the Distinguished Service Order – 26 June 1902 – South Africa Honours list, for service during the recent operations in South Africa.

== Coat of arms ==
Coat of arms of Sir Watkin Williams-Wynn, 9th Baronet
Crest An eagle displayed or. Escutcheon Quarterly, 1st and 4th, Vert three eagles displayed in fesse or (Wynn), 2nd and 3rd, Argent two foxes counter-salient Gules the dexter surmounted of the sinister (Williams). Motto Eryr Eryror Eryri (The eagle of the eagles of Snowdon)

Baronetage of England
Preceded by Watkin Williams-Wynn	Baronet (of Bodelwyddan in Flint, and of Gray's Inn); 1949–1951	Succeeded by Owen Watkin Williams-Wynn
