= West Somerset Yeomanry =

- Active: June 1794–9 November 1988; 2014–Present
- Country: Kingdom of Great Britain (1794–1800); United Kingdom (1801–1988)
- Branch: British Army
- Type: Yeomanry
- Size: Regiment
- Part of: Boer War; Imperial Yeomanry; World War I Yeomanry; Infantry; World War II; Royal Artillery
- Garrison/HQ: Taunton
- Engagements: Boer War South Africa 1900–01 World War I Gallipoli 1915 Egypt 1916–17 Palestine 1917–18 France and Flanders 1918 World War II North-West Europe 1944–45

The West Somerset Yeomanry was a Yeomanry regiment of the British Army. First raised in 1794, it participated in the Second Boer War and World War I before being converted to an artillery regiment. It served in World War II (as two field artillery regiments). Post-war it was gradually reduced in strength until the yeomanry lineage of the successor unit was discontinued on 9 November 1988.

== French Revolutionary and Napoleonic Wars ==
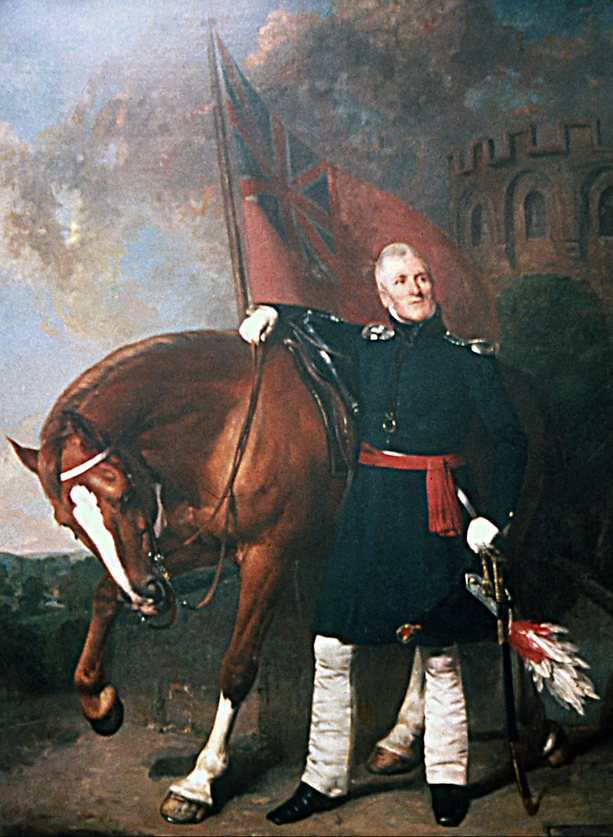
1839 portrait of the regimental colonel Sir Thomas Lethbridge

Under threat of invasion by Revolutionary France from 1793, and with insufficient military forces to repulse such an attack, the British government under William Pitt the Younger decided in 1794 to increase the Militia and to form corps of volunteers for the defence of the country. The mounted arm of the volunteers became known as the "Gentlemen and Yeomanry Cavalry", who could be called on by the King to defend the country against invasion or by the Lord Lieutenant to subdue any civil disorder within the county. A Troop was raised in Bridgwater, Somerset, as early as June 1794. Three other troops were raised by the end of the year, and they were regimented as the West Somersetshire Yeomanry Cavalry in 1798 William Bellett, a half-pay lieutenant in the 22nd Foot, was appointed captain and adjutant of the West Somerset Yeomanry in 1794.

Despite the end of the Napoleonic Wars in 1815, the Yeomanry was retained by the government "for Military Service in aid of the Civil Power" in the absence of organised police forces. The establishment of police forces reduced the need for Yeomanry to be called out. The unwillingness of the government to pay for the Yeomanry led to many corps (Note: Corps in this context means either an independent troop or a number of troops under a single command.) being disbanded in 1827–28. Twenty-two corps were authorised to continue officially, and another sixteen were allowed to continue to serve without pay. Serving without pay from 1828 to 1831, the Regiment was never disbanded.

However, a wave of civil unrest across Britain from 1830 led to a revival of the Yeomanry. The West Somerset Yeomanry was reorganised in 1831 and Charles Kemeys Kemeys-Tynte, Member of Parliament for Bridgwater was appointed Colonel Commandant on 25 July 1831.

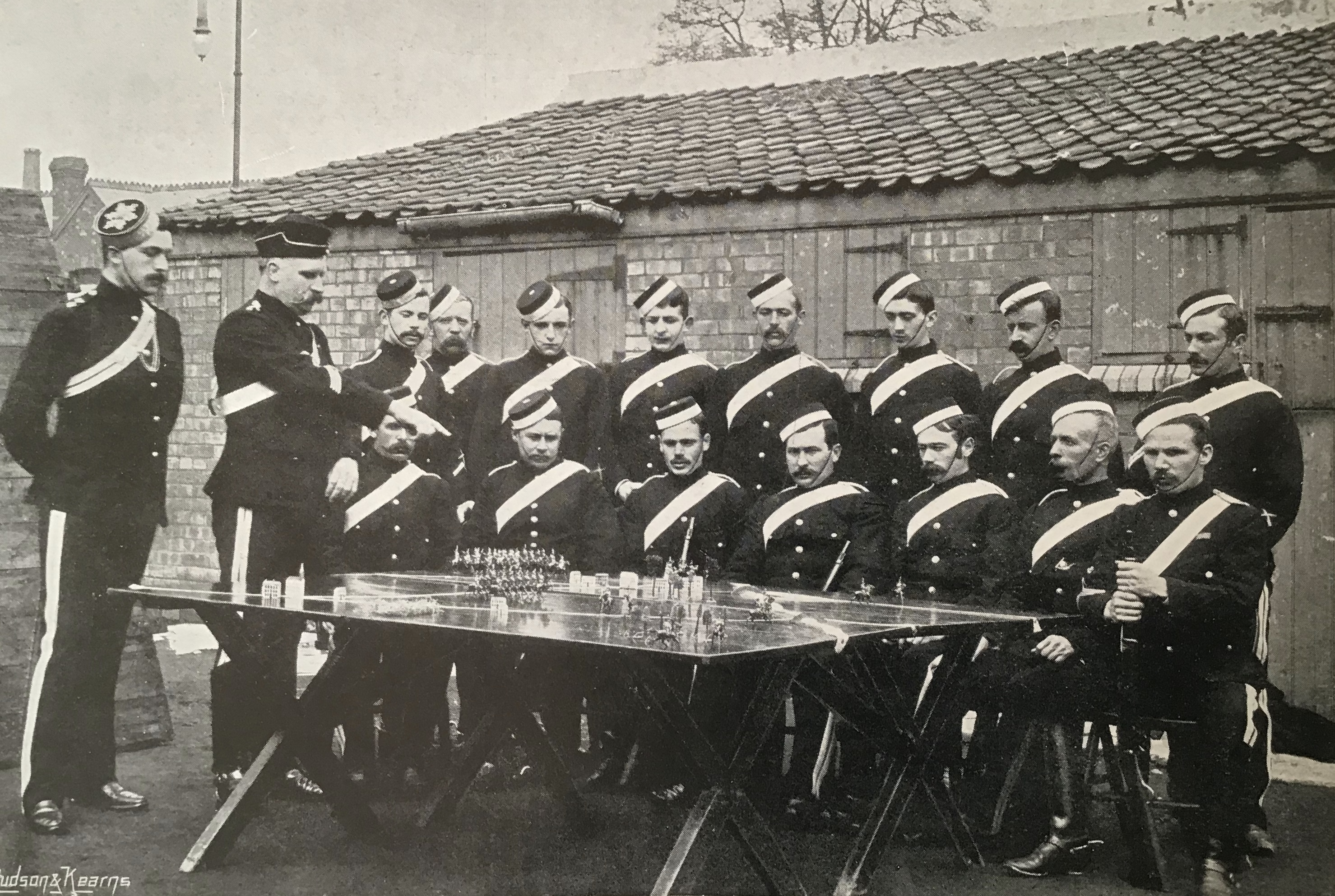
Regimental troops receiving instruction in scouting, 1898

Following the Cardwell Reforms a mobilisation scheme began to appear in the Army List from December 1875. This assigned Yeomanry units places in an order of battle of corps, divisions and brigades for the 'Active Army', even though these formations were entirely theoretical, with no staff or services assigned. The West Somerset, Dorset and Wiltshire Yeomanry were assigned to the Cavalry Brigade of V Corps based at Yeovil, alongside two Regular Army cavalry regiments and a Royal Horse Artillery battery. This was never more than a paper organisation, but from April 1893 the Army List showed the Yeomanry regiments grouped into brigades for collective training. They were commanded by the senior regimental commanding officer but they did have a Regular Army Brigade major. The West Somerset Yeomanry together with the North Somerset Yeomanry formed the 4th Yeomanry Brigade. The Yeomanry brigades disappeared from the Army List after the Second Boer War. On 1 April 1893, Yeomanry troops were reorganised into squadrons.

== Imperial Yeomanry ==
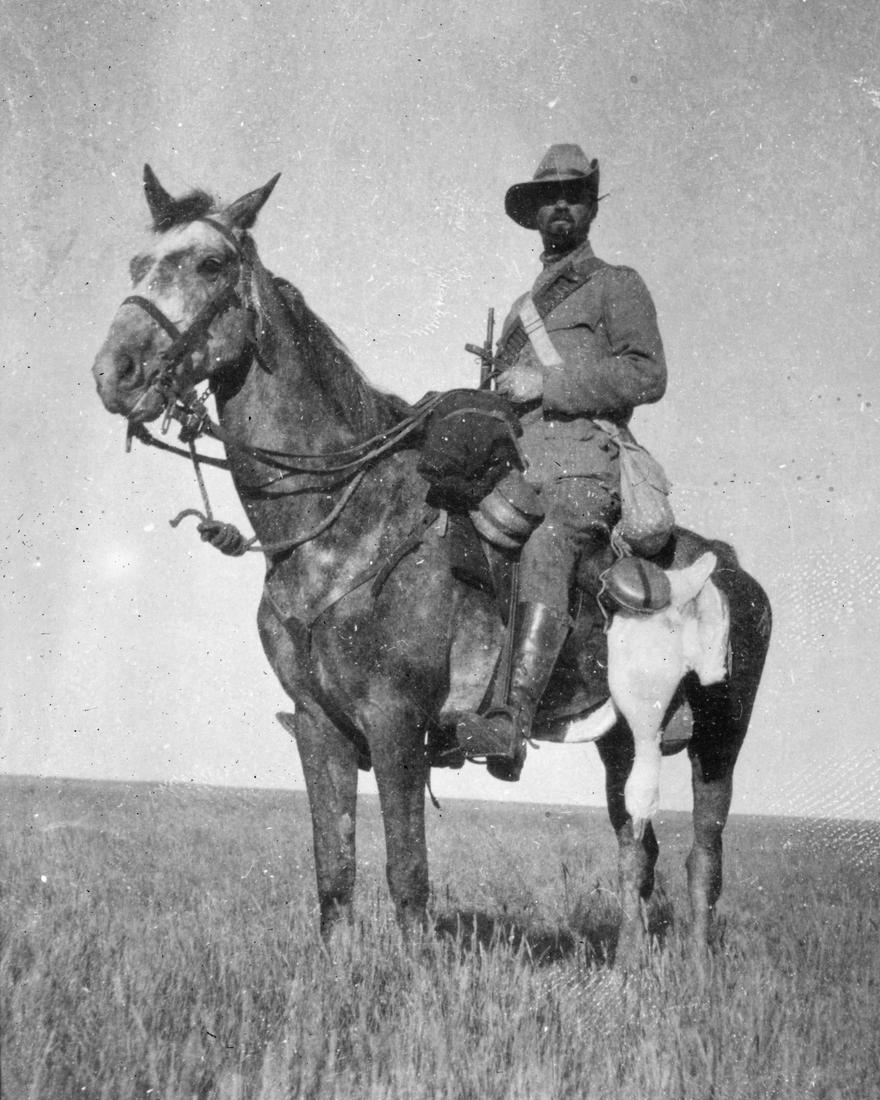
A typical Imperial Yeoman on campaign

Due to the string of defeats during Black Week in December 1899, the British government realised that more troops, in addition to the regular army, were needed in South Africa to fight the Second Boer War. On 13 December 1899, it was decided to allow volunteer forces to serve in the. A Royal Warrant was issued on 24 December 1899, officially creating the Imperial Yeomanry (IY). The Royal Warrant asked standing Yeomanry regiments to provide service companies of about 115 men each, trained as Mounted infantry. In addition, many British citizens (usually mid-upper class) volunteered to join the new units. The first contingent of recruits in 20 four-companybattalions arrived in South Africa between February and April 1900.

The West Somerset Yeomanry sponsored 25th (West Somerset) Company, which served in 7th Battalion, IY, (alongside the Dorset, Devon and North Somerset Yeomanry companies), and sailed for the Cape in March 1900.

On arrival, the battalion joined a Yeomanry brigade under Col Viscount Downe to take part in Lord Roberts' advance from Bloemfontein. However, formations were frequently reorganised, and by mid-April the 7th Bn was operating under Major-General John Brabazon in Lieutenant-General Sir Herbert Chermside's column. Brabazon's brigade was sent ahead as a covering force on 20 April as the columns advanced on Dewetsdorp. The Yeomanry attempted to outflank the main Boer position, but were driven back by pom-pom gun and rifle fire. After the Boers evacuated Dewetsdorp, Brabazon was sent to relieve the beleaguered garrison of Wepener. By early May, the battalion was serving as 'Corps Troops' under Robert's main army. From September 1900 the fighting developed into Guerrilla warfare, and the mounted troops took part in 'drives' trying to catch groups of Boers, and providing escorts for convoys. The First Contingent of the IY returned home after its year's service, and the next time the 7th Bn went in to action, in May 1901, its ranks had been refilled with raw recruits from England.

25th Company gained the West Somerset Yeomanry its first Battle honour: South Africa 1900–01.

The Imperial Yeomanry were trained and equipped as mounted infantry. The concept was considered a success and before the war ended the existing Yeomanry regiments at home were converted into Imperial Yeomanry, with an establishment of RHQ and four squadrons with a machine gun section. The regiment became the West Somerset Imperial Yeomanry on 17 April 1901.

== Territorial Force ==
The Imperial Yeomanry were subsumed into the new Territorial Force (TF) under the Haldane Reforms of 1908. On 1 April 1908, the regiment was renamed as the West Somerset Yeomanry. The regiment was based at County Territorial Hall in Taunton (since demolished). It formed part of the 2nd South Western Mounted Brigade in Southern Command.

The regiment's organisation was:

	West Somerset Yeomanry
HQ	Taunton
A Squadron	Wellington (detachments at Minehead, Wiveliscombe, Washford, Dulverton, Williton)
B Squadron	Taunton (detachments at Churchinford, Buckland St. Mary, Bishops Lydeard, Churchstanton, Hatch Beauchamp)
C Squadron	Bridgwater (detachments at Highbridge, Glastonbury, Langport, Nether Stowey, North Petherton)
D Squadron	Yeovil (detachments at Crewkerne, Chard, Ilminster, South Petherton, Martock)

It was ranked as 33rd (of 55) in the order of precedence of the Yeomanry Regiments in the Army List of 1914. When the order of precedence was being established, inaccuracies in tracing its history led to a loss of precedence despite apparently serving continuously from 1794.

== World War I ==
At the outbreak of the World War I, the regiment mobilised at County Territorial Hall, Taunton, on 4 August 1914 and moved to Winchester. On 15 August it moved with the 2nd South Western Mounted Bde to the Colchester area of Essex, with the regiment at Ardleigh.

Under the Territorial and Reserve Forces Act 1907 (7 Edw. 7, c.9) which brought the TF into being, it was intended to be a home defence force for service during wartime and members could not be compelled to serve outside the country. However, on the outbreak of war, TF units were invited to volunteer for Overseas Service. On 15 August 1914, the War Office issued instructions to separate those men who had signed up for Home Service only, and form these into reserve units, then on 31 August, the formation of a reserve or 2nd Line unit was authorised for each 1st Line unit where 60 per cent or more of the men had volunteered for Overseas Service. The titles of these 2nd Line units would be the same as the original, but distinguished by a '2/' prefix. In this way duplicate battalions, brigades and divisions were created, mirroring those TF formations being sent overseas. Early in 1915 a 3rd Line was formed to act as a reserve, providing trained replacements for the 1st and 2nd Line regiments.

=== 1/1st West Somerset Yeomanry ===
The 1/1st West Somerset Yeomanry remained in Essex for the next year, moving to Great Bentley in October 1914 and Tendring the following month. In August 1915 a Yeomanry division (2nd Mounted Division) serving in Egypt was dismounted and sent to reinforce the Mediterranean Expeditionary Force fighting at Gallipoli, and a number of independent mounted brigades were sent from England to join them. The 1/2nd South Western Bde was one of those selected: the 1/1st West Somerset Yeomanry was dismounted at Thorpe-le-Soken. It entrained for Liverpool on 23 September, embarked next day aboard the RMS Olympic and sailed on 25 September.

==== Gallipoli 1915 ====
The 1/2nd South Western Mounted Bde arrived at Mudros on 1 October, transferred to the SS Osmanieh and sailed for Suvla Bay. It landed on 9 October and was attached to 11th (Northern) Division. The 1/1st WSY bivouacked at 'Oxford Street' at Karakol Dagh. It began work on digging trenches and suffered its first casualties. On 3 November the brigade did its first tour of duty in the firing line, with 1/1st WSY relieving 9th Battalion Lancashire Fusiliers in the forward trenches at 'Lone Tree Gully'. It was relieved by 9th Bn Sherwood Foresters on 11 November and returned to Oxford St, later marching via Lala Baba and Salt Lake to the A Section support trenches.

The 1/2nd South Western Mounted Bde was attached to the 2nd Mounted Division from 15 November, and the 1/1st WSY took over forward trenches in 'White House' sector on 18 November, with its HQ at 'Pope's Seat'. It was relieved by the 1/1st Royal North Devon Yeomanry on 24 November and went back to the support line at 'Willow Tree', 'Cater's House' and 'Tint's Corner', but on 27 November B Sqn was sent up to reinforce the North Devons in the firing line and next day C Sqn similarly reinforced 1/1st Royal 1st Devon Yeomanry. This was during a severe storm that turned into a blizzard. The brigade, and 53rd (Welsh) Division to which it had just been attached, suffered large numbers of casualties due to the weather as well as battle casualties – on 29 November the Willow Tree position was badly shelled. By the time the 1/1st WSY was relieved and went back to Lala Baba, it had suffered casualties of 3 officers and 78 other ranks in the period 27–29 November. Its strength was down to 294 by 2 December, with many men sick in hospital, and it dwindled to 111 by 4 December.

The 1/2nd South Western Mounted Bde was attached to 2nd Mounted Division again on 9 December, and the remnant of 1/1st WSY returned to the Willow Tree sector next day. However, the decision had been made to shut down the campaign, and the Suvla sector was evacuated first. 1/1st West Somerset Yeomanry was embarked during the last night of the operation, 19/20 December, when the secret evacuation was achieved without a single casualty. The regiment was taken first to Imbros and then re-embarked for Egypt.

==== Egypt 1916–17 ====
In December 1915 the regiment landed in Alexandria. In February 1916, 1/2nd South Western Mounted Bde was absorbed into the 2nd Dismounted Brigade (along with elements of the Highland and Lowland Mounted Brigades) in the Western Frontier Force (WFF).

The Senussi Campaign in Egypt's Western Desert had begun in November 1915 and the WFF had been assembled at Mersa Matruh to deal with it. However, the fighting was virtually over by the beginning of April. To conserve supplies many of the mounted troops were withdrawn from the WFF, and replaced by the dismounted brigades. 2nd Dismounted Bde was left as part of the WFF for frontier garrison and line of communication duties.

229th Brigade's formation sign, with the 'Broken Spur' insignia of the 74th (Yeomanry) Division, marking the loss of its horses

By the end of 1916 the 2nd Dismounted Bde was in the Suez Canal defences. The Egyptian Expeditionary Force (EEF) was about to cross the Sinai Peninsula and begin its invasion of Palestine, and began the process of turning the dismounted yeomanry into a new infantry division for this campaign. On 4 January 1917, 1/1st West Somerset Yeomanry was converted at Ismaïlia to form the 12th (West Somerset Yeomanry) Battalion, Somerset Light Infantry and on 14 January 2nd Dismounted Brigade became 229th Infantry Brigade. A new 74th (Yeomanry) Division began to form on 4 March, and 229th Bde joined it at El Arish on 9 March.

==== Palestine 1917–18 ====
Apart from artillery, the 74th (Y) Division was fully assembled in time for the Second Battle of Gaza. It took over the outpost line on 7 April and was in reserve for the attacks on 17 and 19 April but was not engaged. It was able to complete its organisation and training in the pause before the Third Battle of Gaza began on 27 October. While Turkish attention was fixed on Gaza City by a heavy bombardment from land and sea, XX Corps, including 74th (Y) Division led by 229th Bde, made a night approach march on 30/31 October to attack Beersheba on the Turks' landward flank. The other two brigades of the division then attacked through the dust clouds of the preliminary bombardment at 12.15 next day, while the Desert Mounted Corps swept round the flank and into Beersheba itself. The Battle of Beersheba was a resounding success, and XX Corps pressed on northwards as the Turks fell back to the Sheria Position. 229th Brigade led 74th (Y) Division's pre-dawn attack on this position on 8 November, without preliminary bombardment or barrage. Shortly after 06.00 the brigade had captured a series of strongpoints and moved onto the next group of works. Here the fighting was tougher, and two counter-attacks had to be driven off, but after a short pause for reorganisation, 229th Bde began rolling up the Turkish line, reaching its final objective (the Beersheba railway) at 13.15.

While the mounted troops pursued the beaten enemy, 74th (Y) Division paused and re-equipped with winter clothing for the next phase of the campaign. By 25 November the division was about four days' march behind the fighting line, but it was brought up for the advance into the Judaean Hills towards Jerusalem. The Turks launched strong counter-attacks on 27 and 28 November, and 74th (Y) Division began arriving to reinforce the position on 29 November. The leading brigade was thrown into a confused situation and 229th Bde moved in on 30 November to restore the line but one outpost could not be permanently recovered even after hard fighting that continued until 3 December. However, on 8 December the EEF launched its final attack on Jerusalem. 74th (Y) Division's attack on a narrow front was carried out by two battalions of 229th Bde: 12th (Ayr & Lanark Yeomanry) Bn Royal Scots Fusiliers in the lead, and 12th (WSY) Somerset LI in support. The enemy was fast asleep as the troops descended into the bed of the Wadi Buwai and scaled the steep ascent on the other side. After a short fight the Turkish trench was captured with numerous prisoners. Next day Jerusalem surrendered and 229th Bde's advance reached its objective north of the city without any fighting. The division was then engaged in road-making for most of the month while the EEF defended Jerusalem against Turkish counter-attacks. The division resumed its advance on 27 December as the EEF established a strong defence line.

74th (Y) Division then went into reserve. By March the EEF was ready to advance into the Jordan Valley. 229th Brigade made its approach march to Lake Balua, north of Bire, on the Nablus road north of Jerusalem. Then on the night of 8 March XX Corps advanced on the high ground of Tell 'Asur dominating the valley. 53rd (Welsh) and 60th (2/2nd London) Divisions secured the hill after bitter fighting on 9 March, and after nightfall 74th (Y) Division resumed its advance astride the Nablus road. 229th Brigade was in support as the division struggled over the rough country, capturing 'Yeoman's Hill' on 10 March. The Battle of Tell 'Asur was 74th (Y) Division's last action in the campaign: on 3 April 1918 it was warned that it would move to the Western Front, where the German Spring Offensive was under way. By 30 April 1918 the division had completed embarkation at Alexandria.

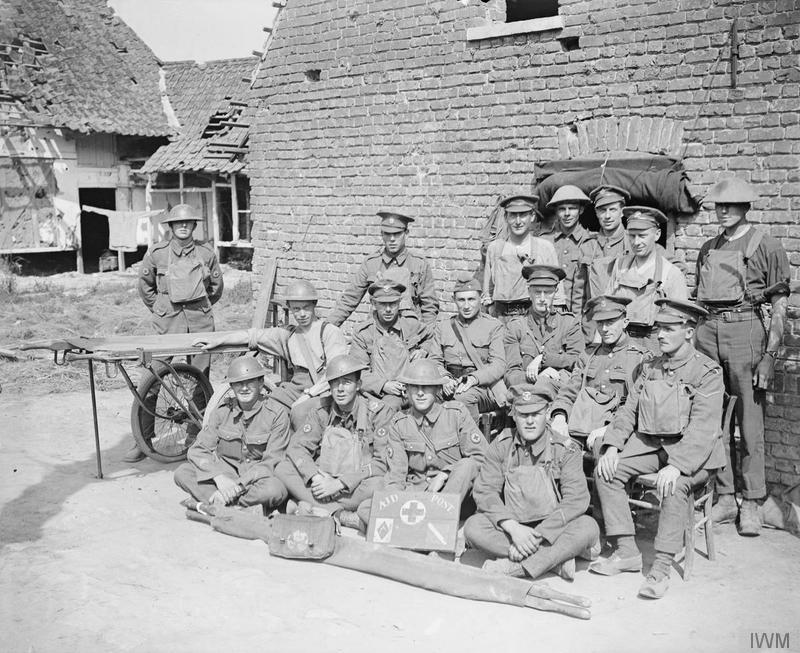
Troops of 230th Field Ambulance, Royal Army Medical Corps, and the 12th (West Somerset Yeomanry) Bn, Somerset Light Infantry, at the Regimental Aid Post near Carvin, France, 14 August 1918

==== France and Flanders 1918 ====
On 7 May 1918, 12th (WSY) Bn, Somerset LI, landed at Marseille, France, with 74th (Y) Division. The division concentrated in the Abbeville area and underwent training for Western Front fighting, particularly anti-gas measures. On 31 May the division went into GHQ Reserve while it continued training. It went into the line on 14 July near Merville.

The Allies launched their final Hundred Days Offensive in August and on 29 August the division moved into reserve behind III Corps of Fourth Army. On 2 September it went into action in the Second Battle of Bapaume. 229th Brigade led the advance with 12th (WSY) Somerset LI on its right. The brigade first had to clear some enemy machine gun outposts and capture its assigned jumping-off trench, which the 3rd Australian Division had failed to secure the day before. It then began its planned advance. Getting ahead of the neighbouring Australians, the 12th (WSY) Bn received enfilade fire from the village of Allaines on its flank, so it turned aside, attacked the village (an Australian objective) taking 70 prisoners, and calmly resumed its advance. The rest of the brigade encountered more difficulty, but was able to reorganise and advance to its assigned outpost line at dusk.

Fourth Army then pursued the Germans back towards the Hindenburg Line, 74th (Y) Division reaching Ronssoy Wood on 8 September, but III Corps was unable to capture Épehy on 9 September. A fullscale attack on these strong positions (the Battle of Épehy) therefore had to be organised, and during the pause 74th (Y) Division suffered many casualties from Mustard gas. The night-time assembly for the attack was made difficult by rain and gas, but the attack went in at 05.20 on 18 September and the 12th (WSY) Bn leapfrogged through the 16th (Sussex Yeomanry) Battalion, Royal Sussex Regiment to gain the second objective. There followed a couple of days' skirmishing as the division consolidated its positions to prepare for another advance. It was then relieved on the night of 24/25 September.

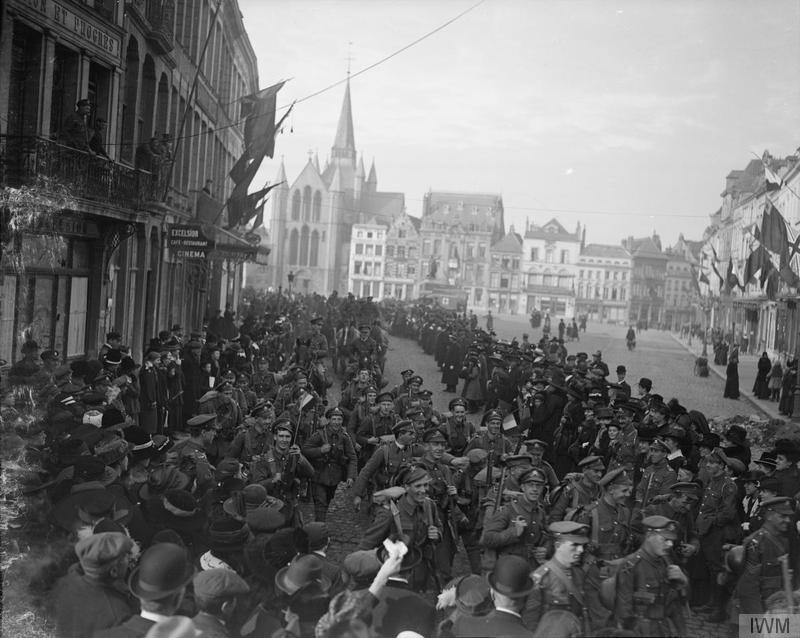
74th (Yeomanry) Division marches through the liberated city of Tournai on 10 November 1918.

74th (Y) Division did not return to line until after Fourth Army had broken through the Hindenburg Line at the Battle of the St Quentin Canal. It joined XI Corps in Fifth Army on the night of 1/2 October and began advancing before it had completed its relief of the division in the line. The relief was concluded the next night after a 2 miles (3.2 km) advance to Hargnies. On 8 October it reverted to III Corps, whose HQ took over the line in this area. On 14 October Fifth Army began pursuing the Germans towards the River Scheldt, but 229th Bde was kept back from the Haute Deûle Canal by enemy fire, and had to make an assault crossing on 17 October. Next day the brigade turned German snipers out of Ascq and then drove the enemy off the Orchies–Lannoy railway embankment. Next day the division lost touch with the retreating Germans. On 20 October, with the front narrowing, 229th Bde took over the whole divisional frontage as it approached Tournai and the Scheldt. Here resistance stiffened, and 21 October it could get no further than the high ground overlooking the city.

After several days of patrolling and raiding, 74th (Y) Division discovered early on the morning of 8 November that the enemy had abandoned their positions and it occupied Tournai, with troops crossing the Scheldt by temporary footbridges. Next day the division put out outposts, but it had lost touch with the enemy. The following day, 11 November, the division crossed the Dendre Canal and occupied Ath at 08.30; at 11.00 the Armistice with Germany came into force, ending hostilities.

The troops of 74th (Y) Division were then engaged in repairing the Tournai–Leuze railway. In December the division moved into winter quarters in the Lessines area. Demobilisation proceeded rapidly from February 1919, and the units dwindled away. The remaining cadre of 12th (WSY) Battalion Somerset LI returned home and was disembodied at Taunton on 20 June 1919.

=== 2/1st West Somerset Yeomanry ===
The 2nd Line regiment was formed at Taunton in 1914. In January 1915 it joined 2/2nd South Western Mounted Brigade at Woodbury and in September 1915 it moved to Essex. On 31 March 1916, the remaining Mounted Brigades were ordered to be numbered in a single sequence; the brigade was numbered as 2nd Mounted Brigade and joined 1st Mounted Division. In about May 1916 it went to Norfolk with its brigade.

Early in July 1916 most of the 2nd Line Yeomanry were dismounted and their horses were sent to remount depots. Instead they were issued with bicycles and converted into yeomanry cyclist regiments units. The 1st Mounted Division became 1st Cyclist Division and the 3/1st WSY joined 1st Cyclist Brigade in the Beccles area of Suffolk. In November 1916, the 1st Cyclist Division was broken up and on 16 November the regiment was amalgamated with the 2/1st City of London Yeomanry (Rough Riders) to form the 5th (West Somerset and City of London) Yeomanry Cyclist Regiment in the independent 2nd Cyclist Brigade in Norfolk.

In February 1917, the City of London Yeomanry was replaced by 2/1st Hampshire Yeomanry and the unit became 5th (Hampshire and West Somerset) Yeomanry Cyclist Regiment. In March 1917 it resumed its identity as 2/1st West Somerset Yeomanry, still with the 2nd Cyclist Bde, at Elmham near East Dereham. It remained in Norfolk until May 1918 when it went to Ireland with the 2nd Cyclist Bde and was stationed at Athlone until the end of the war.

2/1st West Somerset Yeomanry was disbanded on 24 November 1919 at The Curragh.

=== 3/1st West Somerset Yeomanry ===
The 3rd Line regiment was formed in 1915. In the summer it was affiliated to a Reserve Cavalry Regiment at Tidworth. In July 1916 it was dismounted and attached to the 3rd Line Groups of the Wessex Division at Winchester as its 1st Line was serving as infantry. Disbanded in early 1917 with personnel transferring to the 2nd Line regiment or to the 4th (Reserve) Battalion of the Somerset Light Infantry at Bournemouth.

== Between the wars ==
The TF was reconstituted on 7 February 1920. After the experience of the war, it was decided that only the 14 most senior yeomanry regiments would be retained as cavalry; the rest were converted to other roles. Thus on 1 June 1920 the West Somerset Yeomanry was transferred to the Royal Field Artillery to form the 1st (Somerset) Army Brigade, RFA, (Note: In the Royal Artillery prior to 1938 a brigade was a lieutenant-colonel's command consisting of independent batteries 'brigaded' together; it was not comparable with an infantry or cavalry brigade commanded by a brigadier-general.) with two batteries. In 1921 the TF was reorganised as the Territorial Army (TA) and brigade was renumbered as the 94th (Somerset Yeomanry) Brigade, RFA. On 25 January 1922 the Dorset Yeomanry (Queen's Own) was also converted to artillery and merged with the WSY to form the 94th (Somerset & Dorset Yeomanry) Bde, RFA, which adjusted its title in June 1923 to 94th (Dorset & Somerset Yeomanry) Bde, RFA with the following organisation:

- Brigade HQ at Taunton
- 373 (West Somerset Yeomanry) Battery at Taunton
- 374 (West Somerset Yeomanry) Battery at Glastonbury
- 375 (Dorset Yeomanry) Battery at Blandford Forum
- 376 (Dorset Yeomanry) Battery (Howitzers) at Sherborne
- 223 RFA Bde Signal Section, Royal Corps of Signals, at Taunton (attached)

The RFA was subsumed into the Royal Artillery (RA) on 1 June 1924 and its units became Field Brigades and Field Batteries.

The Dorset & Somerset brigade was a short-lived marriage: in July 1929 the Somerset Yeomanry batteries were moved to 55th (Wessex) Army Field Brigade, RA while the Dorset Yeomanry continued as the 94th. 55th (Wessex) Brigade had similarly been split up, with its Hampshire batteries joining 95th (Hampshire Yeomanry) Bde, leaving two Wiltshire batteries. The new organisation was as follows:

55th (Wessex) Field Brigade, RA

- Brigade HQ at Taunton
- 217 (Wiltshire) Field Bty (H) at Swindon
- 220 (Wiltshire) Field Bty at Swindon
- 373 (West Somerset Yeomanry) Field Bty at Taunton
- 374 (West Somerset Yeomanry) Field Bty at Glastonbury, later Shepton Mallet

The brigade served as 'Army Troops' in 43rd (Wessex) Divisional Area. The establishment of a TA field artillery brigade was four 6-gun batteries, three equipped with 18-pounder guns and one with 4.5-inch howitzers, all of World War I patterns. However, the batteries only held four guns in peacetime. The guns and their first-line ammunition wagons were horsedrawn and the battery staffs were mounted. Partial mechanisation was carried out from 1927, but the guns retained iron-tyred wheels until pneumatic tyres began to be introduced just before the outbreak of World War II. A few Morris CDSW gun tractors were issued to TA batteries in early 1939. The rearmament programme of 1938 introduced the Ordnance QF 25-pounder gun-howitzer, initially in the form of the hybrid 18/25-pounder consisting of a 25-pdr gun mounted on a converted 18-pdr carriage, but these were only just being issued to Regular units when war broke out, and TA units had to wait.

In 1938 the RA modernised its nomenclature and a lieutenant-colonel's command was designated a 'regiment' rather than a 'brigade'; this applied to TA field brigades from 1 November 1938.

== World War II ==
=== Mobilisation ===
After the Munich Crisis the TA was doubled in size and its units formed duplicates. In the case of the 55th (Wessex) this was done on 22 July 1939 by splitting off the two Wiltshire batteries to form 112th Field Regiment, with Regimental Headquarters (RHQ) at Swindon. The new regiment remained with 43rd (Wessex) Division while 55th (Wessex) Field Regiment (now often referred to simply as the 'West Somerset Yeomanry') joined the new duplicate 45th Division.

Part of the reorganisation was that field regiments changed from four six-gun batteries to an establishment of two batteries, each of three four-gun troops.

25 pounders of 55th Field Regiment, near Hechtel in Belgium, firing in support of Guards Armoured Division in the bridgehead over the Maas-Schelde (Meuse-Escaut) Canal, 16 September 1944

=== 55th (Wessex) Field Regiment ===
At the outbreak of the war, 55th Field Regiment mobilised as part of 45th Division, which served on anti-invasion duties after the British Expeditionary Force (BEF) had been evacuated from Dunkirk. Later in 1940 it joined I Corps in the north of England. The BEF's experience in the Battle of France showed the problem with the two-battery organisation: field regiments were intended to support an infantry brigade of three battalions. This could not be managed without severe disruption to the regiment. As a result, field regiments were reorganised into three 8-gun batteries. 55th (Wessex) Field Regiment formed its third battery at Barnsley on 15 November 1940 and it was numbered as 439 Bty on 1 February 1941.

In June 1942, the regiment transferred to the Guards Armoured Division, landing with it in Normandy in June 1944 after on D-Day. It fought throughout the campaign in North West Europe with the division until the end of the war, including Operations Epsom, Goodwood, and Bluecoat in Normandy, the attempt to seize Arnhem bridge (Operation Market Garden), Operation Veritable in the Reichswald, and the crossing of the River Ems. The division's published history always refers to the regiment as the West Somerset Yeomanry, which suggests that this was how they referred to themselves, and the Commonwealth War Graves Commission records its casualties under '55 (West Somerset Yeomanry) Field Regt' rather than '55 (Wessex)'.

=== 112th (Wessex) Field Regiment ===
112th (Wessex) Field Regiment served with 43rd (Wessex) Division in Home Forces for most of the war. It formed its third battery (477) at Sarre, Kent, on 25 March 1941 and was authorised to use the "Wessex" designation from 17 February 1942.

43rd (W) Division and 112th (Wessex) Field Regiment remained in the UK until after D Day in June 1944, when they were deployed to Normandy. The regiment participated in Operations Epsom, Jupiter and Bluecoat in Normandy, the crossing of the Seine, the battle for Arnhem (Operation Market Garden) in the Low Countries, and then Operations Clipper, Blackcock, Veritable and Plunder across Germany until the end of the war.

== Postwar ==
55th (Wessex) Field Regiment was placed in 'suspended animation' in British Army of the Rhine on 31 December 1946 and next day (1 January 1947) was reformed in the TA as 255 (Wessex) Medium Regiment in 91 (Field) Army Group Royal Artillery, with RHQ at Shepton Mallet. (112th (Wessex) Field Regiment also reformed, as 312th Medium Regiment, but had no Somerset connections.)

On 1 July 1950 the regiment absorbed 663 (Somerset) Super Heavy Regiment (a new regiment that had been formed at Midsomer Norton in 1947), which became Q Bty, and RHQ moved back to Taunton.

On 31 October 1956 it amalgamated with 421 (Dorset) Coast Regiment, becoming 255 (West Somerset Yeomanry and Dorset Garrison) Medium Regiment. In 1961 it merged with 294 (Queen's Own Dorset Yeomanry) Field Regiment to form 250 Queen's Own Dorset & West Somerset Yeomanry) Medium Regiment with RHQ at Yeovil. When the TA was reduced into the Territorial and Army Volunteer Reserve in 1967, part of this unit became 'B' (West Somerset Yeomanry) Company at Yeovil in the Somerset Yeomanry and Light Infantry (Territorials) and ceased to be an artillery unit. ('A' (North Somerset and Bristol Yeomanry) Company in the same battalion was descended from the former North Somerset Yeomanry.)

On 1 April 1969, the battalion was reduced to a cadre at Keynsham, under 219 General Hospital, Royal Army Medical Corps. However, on 1 April 1971 the cadre was disbanded and reformed as two companies of the 6th (Volunteer) Battalion, The Light Infantry, at Bath. 'A' (Somerset Yeomanry Light Infantry) Company at Bath was the successor to the North Somerset Yeomanry, while 'B' (Somerset Yeomanry Light Infantry) Company at Yeovil (with a detachment at Taunton) continued the lineage of the West Somerset Yeomanry. Finally, on 9 November 1988, company subtitles were omitted and the yeomanry lineage was discontinued.

In 2013 it was announced as part of Future Reserves 2020, that the Forward Air Control Troop, Royal Signals based at Bath would re-subordinate from the Royal Signals to become the Forward Air Control Battery within the Royal Artillery and be designated 255 (Somerset Yeomanry) Battery Royal Artillery. The battery was formed in September 2014 but it does not use the Somerset Yeomanry lineage and forms part of the 100 (Yeomanry) Regiment, Royal Artillery.

== Heritage and ceremonial ==
=== Colonels ===
The following served as Colonel Commandant or Honorary Colonel of the West Somerset Yeomanry and its successors:

- Col Charles Kemeys Tynte, appointed Colonel Commandant on 25 July 1831
- The Hon William Portman, MP, (later 2nd Viscount Portman) appointed Colonel on 24 January 1854, and Hon Col on 9 May 1896
- Col W. Barrett, TD, former commanding officer, appointed Hon Col 5 December 1911
- Brig-Gen E. Harding Newman, DSO, appointed Hon Col (of 55th (Wessex) Field Bde) 17 January 1931

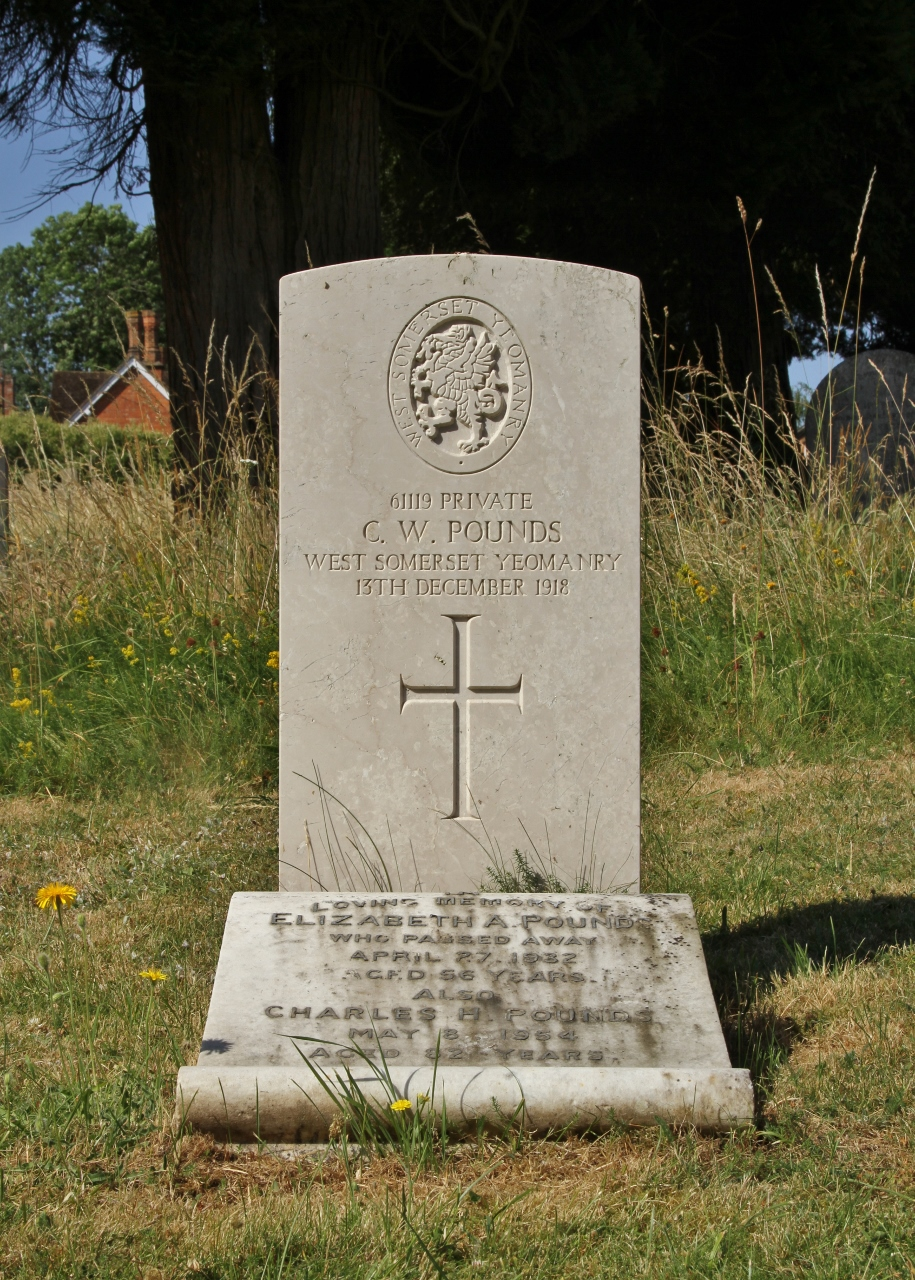
The Commonwealth War Grave Commission headstone of a WSY casualty shows the regimental badge without the 'South Africa 1900–01' scroll.

=== Uniforms and insignia ===
The West Somerset Yeomanry wore a Hussar-style uniform in full dress. The dark blue tunic had red facings and six rows of cord across the chest. The busby had a braided red bag and a white plume. Shoulder-belts and pouches were black.

The regimental cap badge consisted of a Wyvern within a strap bearing the name 'WEST SOMERSET YEOMANRY'. After the Second Boer War the regiment added a scroll underneath the badge inscribed 'S. AFRICA 1900–01'.

Unlike some Yeomanry regiments converted to artillery, it appears that the West Somerset Yeomanry did not retain their regimental cap badge and fully adopted RA badges. However, after World War II, 255 Medium Regiment wore a blue shoulder title with 'WSY' embroidered in yellow beneath the standard 'ROYAL ARTILLERY' embroidered in red. After the merger to form 250 Medium Regiment, this was changed to 'W.S.Y.& D.G'.

=== Battle honours ===
The West Somerset Yeomanry were awarded the following battle honours:

Second Boer War

South Africa 1900–01

World War I

Somme 1918, Bapaume 1918, Hindenburg Line, Épéhy, Pursuit to Mons, France and Flanders 1918, Gallipoli 1915, Egypt 1916–17, Gaza, Jerusalem, Tell 'Asur, Palestine 1917–18

World War II

Units of the Royal Artillery do not carry battle honours: traditionally their motto Ubique ('Everywhere') is held to cover them all

== See also ==
- List of Yeomanry Regiments 1908
- Yeomanry order of precedence
- British yeomanry during the First World War
- Second line yeomanry regiments of the British Army
- List of British Army Yeomanry Regiments converted to Royal Artillery

== Bibliography ==
- L.S. Amery (ed), The Times History of the War in South Africa 1899-1902, London: Sampson Low, Marston, 6 Vols 1900–09.
- Brig C.F. Aspinall-Oglander, History of the Great War: Military Operations Gallipoli, Vol II, May 1915 to the Evacuation, London: Heinemann, 1932/Imperial War Museum & Battery Press, 1992, ISBN 0-89839-175-X/Uckfield: Naval & Military Press, 2011, ISBN 978-1-84574-948-4.
- Maj A.F. Becke,History of the Great War: Order of Battle of Divisions, Part 2a: The Territorial Force Mounted Divisions and the 1st-Line Territorial Force Divisions (42–56), London: HM Stationery Office, 1935/Uckfield: Naval & Military Press, 2007, ISBN 1-847347-39-8.
- Maj A.F. Becke,History of the Great War: Order of Battle of Divisions, Part 2b: The 2nd-Line Territorial Force Divisions (57th–69th), with the Home-Service Divisions (71st–73rd) and 74th and 75th Divisions, London: HM Stationery Office, 1937/Uckfield: Naval & Military Press, 2007, ISBN 1-847347-39-8.
- Maj A.F. Becke,History of the Great War: Order of Battle of Divisions, Part 3a: New Army Divisions (9–26), London: HM Stationery Office, 1938/Uckfield: Naval & Military Press, 2007, ISBN 1-847347-41-X.
- Bellis, Malcolm A. (1995). Regiments of the British Army 1939–1945 (Artillery). London: Military Press International. ISBN 0-85420-110-6.
- Col John K. Dunlop, The Development of the British Army 1899–1914, London: Methuen, 1938.
- Brig-Gen Sir James E. Edmonds, History of the Great War: Military Operations, France and Belgium 1918, Vol IV, 8th August–26th September: The Franco-British Offensive, London: Macmillan, 1939/Uckfield: Imperial War Museum and Naval & Military, 2009, ISBN 978-1-845747-28-2.
- Brig-Gen Sir James E. Edmonds & Lt-Col R. Maxwell-Hyslop, History of the Great War: Military Operations, France and Belgium 1918, Vol V, 26th September–11th November, The Advance to Victory, London: HM Stationery Office, 1947/Imperial War Museum and Battery Press, 1993, ISBN 1-870423-06-2/Uckfield: Naval & Military Press, 2021, ISBN 978-1-78331-624-3.
- Capt Cyril Falls, History of the Great War: Military Operations, Egypt and Palestine, Vol II, From June 1917 to the End of the War, Part I, London: HM Stationery Office, 1930/Uckfield: Naval & Military Press, 2013, ISBN 978-1-84574-951-4.
- Capt Cyril Falls, History of the Great War: Military Operations, Egypt and Palestine, Vol II, From June 1917 to the End of the War, Part II, London: HM Stationery Office, 1930/Uckfield: Naval & Military Press, 2013, ISBN 978-1-84574-950-7.
- Gen Sir Martin Farndale, History of the Royal Regiment of Artillery: The Years of Defeat: Europe and North Africa, 1939–1941, Woolwich: Royal Artillery Institution, 1988/London: Brasseys, 1996, ISBN 1-85753-080-2.
- Forty, George (1998). British Army Handbook 1939–1945. Stroud, Gloucestershire: Sutton Publishing Limited. ISBN 0-7509-1403-3.
- J.B.M. Frederick, Lineage Book of British Land Forces 1660–1978, Vol I, Wakefield, Microform Academic, 1984, ISBN 1-85117-007-3.
- J.B.M. Frederick, Lineage Book of British Land Forces 1660–1978, Vol II, Wakefield: Microform Academic, 1984, ISBN 1-85117-009-X.
- Brig E.A. James, British Regiments 1914–18, London: Samson Books, 1978, ISBN 0-906304-03-2/Uckfield: Naval & Military Press, 2001, ISBN 978-1-84342-197-9.
- Lt-Col H.F. Joslen, Orders of Battle, United Kingdom and Colonial Formations and Units in the Second World War, 1939–1945, London: HM Stationery Office, 1960/London: London Stamp Exchange, 1990, ISBN 0-948130-03-2/ Uckfield: Naval & Military Press, 2003, ISBN 1-843424-74-6.
- N.B. Leslie, Battle Honours of the British and Indian Armies 1695–1914, London: Leo Cooper, 1970, ISBN 0-85052-004-5.
- Norman E.H. Litchfield, The Territorial Artillery 1908–1988 (Their Lineage, Uniforms and Badges), Nottingham: Sherwood Press, 1992, ISBN 0-9508205-2-0.
- Lt-Gen Sir George MacMunn & Capt Cyril Falls, History of the Great War: Military Operations, Egypt and Palestine, Vol I, From the Outbreak of War with Germany to June 1917, London: HM Stationery Office, 1928/Imperial War Museum and Battery Press, 1992, ISBN 1-870423-26-7/Uckfield: Naval & Military Press, 2011, ISBN 978-1-84574-952-1.
- Mileham, Patrick (1994). The Yeomanry Regiments; 200 Years of Tradition. Edinburgh: Canongate Academic. ISBN 1-898410-36-4.
- Rinaldi, Richard A (2008). Order of Battle of the British Army 1914. Ravi Rikhye. ISBN 978-0-9776072-8-0.
- Col H.C.B. Rogers, The Mounted Troops of the British Army 1066–1945, London: Seeley Service, 1959.
- Capt the Earl of Rosse & Col E.R. Hill, The Story of the Guards Armoured Division, London: Geoffrey Bles, 1956/Barnsley: Pen & Sword, 2017, ISBN 978-1-52670-043-8.
- Lt-Col Ernest Ryan 'Arms, Uniforms and Equipment of the Yeomanry Cavalry', Journal of the Society for Army Historical Research, September 1957, Vol 35, pp. 124–133.
- Lt-Col J.D. Sainsbury, The Hertfordshire Yeomanry Regiments, Royal Artillery, Part 1: The Field Regiments 1920-1946, Welwyn: Hertfordshire Yeomanry and Artillery Trust/Hart Books, 1999, ISBN 0-948527-05-6.
- Edward M. Spiers, The Army and Society 1815–1914, London: Longmans, 1980, ISBN 0-582-48565-7.
- War Office, Titles and Designations of Formations and Units of the Territorial Army, London: War Office, 7 November 1927 (RA sections also summarised in Litchfield, Appendix IV).
- Westlake, Ray (1996). British Regiments at Gallipoli. Barnsley: Leo Cooper. ISBN 0-85052-511-X.

=== External links ===
- Anglo-Boer War
- Army Service Numbers blogspot
- Chris Baker, The Long, Long Trail
- Commonwealth War Graves Commission records
- The Drill Hall Project
- T.F. Mills, Land Forces of Britain, the Empire and Commonwealth – Regiments.org (archive site)
- Roll of Honour
