= Royal North Devon Yeomanry =

- Active: 1798 – 7 June 1920
- Country: Kingdom of Great Britain (1798–1800); United Kingdom (1801–1920)
- Branch: British Army
- Type: Yeomanry
- Size: Regiment
- Garrison/HQ: Barnstaple
- Engagements: Second Boer War; First World War Gallipoli 1915 Egypt 1916–17 Palestine 1917–18 France and Flanders 1918

The Royal North Devon Yeomanry was a Yeomanry regiment of the British Army. First raised in 1798, it participated in the Second Boer War and the First World War before being amalgamated with the Royal 1st Devon Yeomanry in 1920 to form the Royal Devon Yeomanry.

== History ==
=== Formation and early history ===
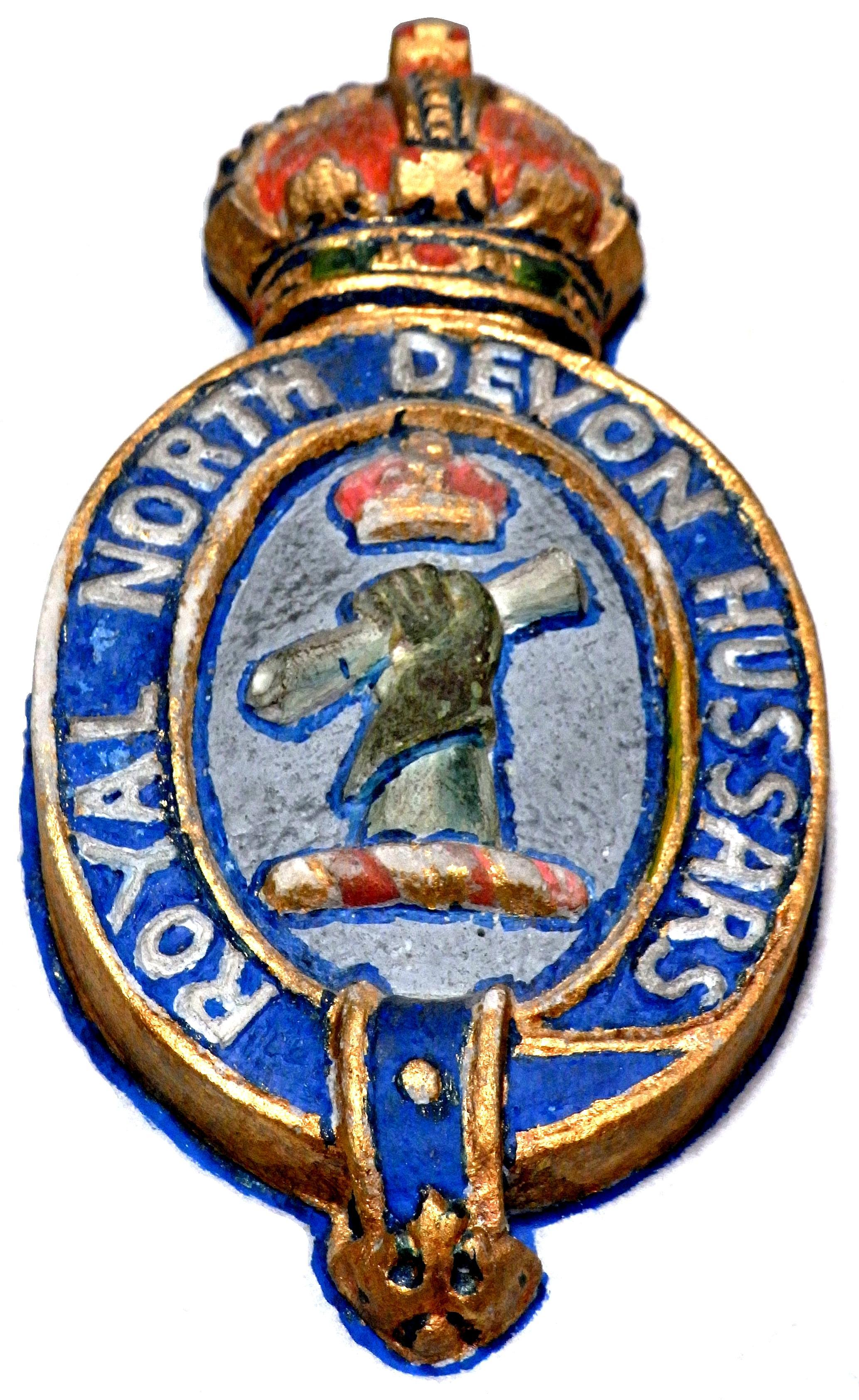
Badge of Royal North Devon Hussars, as seen on framed mural monument in Exford Church, Somerset, to Major Morland Greig (1864–1915), of Edgcott, Exford, Master of the Devon and Somerset Staghounds, killed in action at Gallipoli. The badge is derived from the crest of John Rolle, 1st Baron Rolle (d.1842), (Note: cf. description of hat badge: "A circlet inscribed Royal North Devon Hussars surmounted by an Imperial Crown. In the centre the crest of Lord Rolle, in bronze". Motto: "Manui dat cognitio vires" ("Knowledge gives strength to the arm")) of Stevenstone, who played a significant role in raising the predecessor regiment: A cubit arm erect vested or charged with a fess indented double cotised azure in the hand a roll of parchment. The badge is also shown, but with the hand grasping a palm frond, sculpted on the mural monument in the Church of St Giles in the Wood, Devon, to Captain John Oliver Clemson (1882-1915) of Stevenstone, also killed fighting with the same regiment at Gallipoli

Under threat of invasion by the French Revolutionary government from 1793, and with insufficient military forces to repulse such an attack, the British government under William Pitt the Younger decided in 1794 to increase the Militia and to form corps of volunteers for the defence of the country. The mounted arm of the volunteers became known as the "Gentlemen and Yeomanry Cavalry". The Royal North Devon Yeomanry was first raised in 1798 as independent troops, one of the main organisers of which process was Col. John Rolle, 1st Baron Rolle (1751–1842), of Stevenstone near Great Torrington, Devon. In 1803 it was regimented as the North Devonshire Mounted Rifles.

=== North Devon Regiment of Local Militia ===
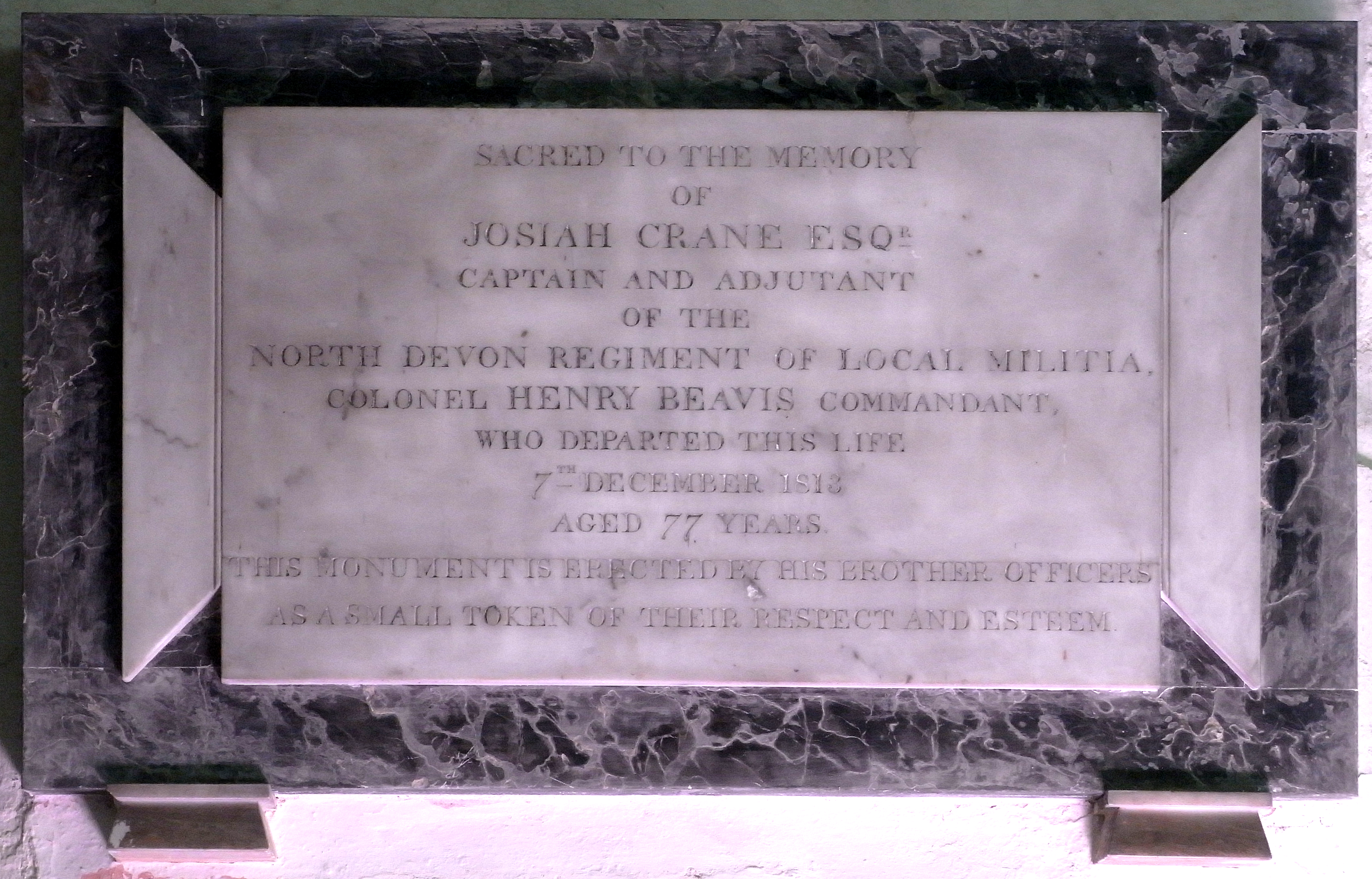
Monument in Pilton Church to Col. Henry II Beavis (1736–1813), "Commandant, North Devon Regiment of Local Militia"

Col. Henry II Beavis (1736–1813), of Yeotown in the parish of Goodleigh, North Devon, was appointed on 5 July 1803 by the King as Lieutenant-Colonel Commandant (of 441 men) of the "Barnstaple Volunteer Infantry". He was the son of Henry I Beavis, Mayor of Barnstaple in 1738 and 1751, whose portrait survives in Barnstaple Guildhall. He died on 7 December 1813, and his small mural monument survives in Pilton Church inscribed as follows:

Sacred to the memory of Josiah Crane Esq., Captain and Adjutant of the North Devon Regiment of Local Militia. Colonel Henry Beavis, Commandant, who departed this life 7th December 1813 aged 77 years. This monument is erected by his brother officers as a small token of their respect and esteem.

Despite the end of the Napoleonic Wars in 1815, the Yeomanry was retained by the government "for Military Service in aid of the Civil Power" in the absence of organised police forces. For example, in 1816, a mob forced its way into Bideford prison to try to release their ringleaders. Members of the Regiment were mustered and patrolled the town all night; several rioters were arrested and escorted to Exeter. The unwillingness of the government to pay for the Yeomanry led to many corps (Note: Corps in this context meaning either an independent troop or a number of troops under a single command.) being disbanded in 1827–28. Twenty-two corps were authorised to continue officially, and another sixteen were allowed to continue to serve without pay. Serving without pay from 1828 to 1831, the Regiment was never disbanded.

The regiment was renamed as the North Devonshire Regiment of Yeomanry Cavalry and in 1856 as the Royal North Devonshire Regiment of Yeomanry Cavalry. In 1868, the regiment was the Royal North Devon Hussars with Headquarters at Barnstaple. On 1 April 1893, the troops were reorganised in squadrons.

=== Second Boer War ===
Due to the string of defeats during Black Week in December 1899, the British government realized they were going to need more troops than just the regular army, thus issuing a Royal Warrant on 24 December 1899 to allow volunteer forces to serve in the Second Boer War. This warrant officially created the Imperial Yeomanry. The Royal Warrant asked standing Yeomanry regiments to provide service companies of approximately 115 men each. In addition to this, many British citizens (usually mid-upper class) volunteered to join the new regiment.

The Royal North Devon Hussars and the Royal 1st Devonshire Yeomanry Cavalry co-sponsored the 27th (Devonshire) Company of the 7th Battalion, Imperial Yeomanry which arrived in South Africa on 23 March 1900.

On 17 April 1901, the regiment was renamed as the Royal North Devonshire Imperial Yeomanry and reorganised in four squadrons and a machine gun section. On 1 April 1908, the regiment was renamed for the final time as the Royal North Devon Yeomanry and transferred to the Territorial Force, trained and equipped as hussars. The regiment was based at Bear Street in Barnstaple at this time.

Its organisation was:

	Royal North Devon Yeomanry
HQ	Barnstaple
A Squadron	Holsworthy (detachments at Black Torrington, Hatherleigh, Bratton Clovelly, Tavistock, Woodford Bridge, Bradworthy)
B Squadron	Barnstaple (detachments at Atherington, Bratton Fleming, Blackmoor Gate, Fremington, Swimbridge, West Down, Braunton)
C Squadron	South Molton (detachments at West Buckland, Molland, Chittlehampton, Sandyway, Ashreigney, Chulmleigh)
D Squadron	Torrington (detachments at Woolsery, Langtree, Parkham, High Bickington, Bideford, Roborough)

It was ranked as 30th (of 55) in the order of precedence of the Yeomanry Regiments in the Army List of 1914.

=== First World War ===
In accordance with the Territorial and Reserve Forces Act 1907 (7 Edw. 7, c.9) which brought the Territorial Force into being, the TF was intended to be a home defence force for service during wartime and members could not be compelled to serve outside the country. However, on the outbreak of war on 4 August 1914, many members volunteered for Imperial Service. Therefore, TF units were split in August and September 1914 into 1st Line (liable for overseas service) and 2nd Line (home service for those unable or unwilling to serve overseas) units. Later, a 3rd Line was formed to act as a reserve, providing trained replacements for the 1st and 2nd Line regiments.

==== 1/1st Royal North Devon Yeomanry ====
At the outbreak of the First World War, the regiment was part of the 2nd South Western Mounted Brigade. It mobilised on 4 August 1914 and, with its brigade, moved to the Colchester area. It was dismounted in September 1915.

===== Gallipoli 1915 =====
Still with the 2nd South Western Mounted Brigade, in September 1915 the regiment left Colchester for Liverpool. On 24 September it boarded RMS Olympic and sailed the next day. It arrived at Mudros on 1 October and on to Suvla Bay. The regiment landed in Gallipoli on 9 October and was attached to the 11th (Northern) Division (digging trenches). In November it was in the firing line, attached to the 2nd Mounted Division and 53rd (Welsh) Infantry Division. On 19 December it was evacuated to Imbros.

The diary of Lt.Col. Robert Arthur Sanders (1867–1940) (Baron Bayford from 1929) of the Royal North Devon Yeomanry (and Master of the Devon and Somerset Staghounds 1895-1907) survives in the National Army Museum covering the Gallipoli Campaign. (Note: Item 103: Diary: Col R. H. Sanders' Diary at Dardanelles 25 September – 30 December 1915; paper covered typescript copy of Col R H Sanders, Royal North Devon Yeomanry (Hussars) at Suvla Bay, Gallipoli, 25 Sep 1915 to 30 Dec 1915; associated with the Suvla Front, World War One, Gallipoli (1914-1918) 1915.) Casualties of the regiment included:

- Major Morland Greig (1864-1915), of Edgcott, Exford, Somerset, then Master of the Devon and Somerset Staghounds (Note: Per his mural monument in Exford Church, Somerset.)
- Captain John Oliver Clemson (1882-1915) of Stevenstone, St Giles in the Wood. (Note: Per his mural monument in the Church of St Giles in the Wood.)

===== Egypt 1916–17 =====
On 30 December 1915, the regiment landed in Alexandria to help defend Egypt. In February 1916, 2nd South Western Mounted Brigade was absorbed into the 2nd Dismounted Brigade (along with elements of the Highland and Lowland Mounted Brigades). It served on Suez Canal defences and part of the Western Frontier Force. On 4 January 1917, the regiment was amalgamated with the 1/1st Royal 1st Devon Yeomanry at Moascar, Egypt to form the 16th (Royal 1st Devon and Royal North Devon Yeomanry) Battalion, Devonshire Regiment and 2nd Dismounted Brigade became 229th Brigade in the 74th (Yeomanry) Division.

===== Palestine 1917–18 =====
With the 74th Division, it took part in the invasion of Palestine in 1917 and 1918. It fought in the Second and Third Battles of Gaza (including the capture of Beersheba and the Sheria Position). At the end of 1917, it took part in the capture and defence of Jerusalem and in March 1918 in the Battle of Tell 'Asur. On 3 April 1918, the Division was warned that it would move to France and by 30 April 1918 had completed embarkation at Alexandria.

===== France and Flanders 1918 =====
On 7 May 1918, 16th (Royal 1st Devon and Royal North Devon Yeomanry) Battalion, Devonshire Regiment landed at Marseille, France with 74th (Yeomanry) Division. It served in France and Flanders with the division for the rest of the war. From September 1918, as part of III Corps of Fourth Army, it took part in the Hundred Days Offensive including the Second Battle of the Somme (Second Battle of Bapaume) and the Battles of the Hindenburg Line (Battle of Épehy). In October and November 1918 it took part in the Final Advance in Artois and Flanders. By the Armistice it was east of Tournai, Belgium, still with 229th Brigade, 74th (Yeomanry) Division.

==== 2/1st Royal North Devon Yeomanry ====
The 2nd Line regiment was formed at Barnstaple in September 1914. In May 1915 it joined 2/2nd South Western Mounted Brigade at Woodbury. In September 1915 it moved to Colchester, taking over the horses of the newly dismounted 1st Line regiment. On 31 March 1916, the remaining Mounted Brigades were ordered to be numbered in a single sequence; the brigade was numbered as 2nd Mounted Brigade and joined 1st Mounted Division. In April 1916 it went to Norfolk.

In July 1916 it became a cyclist unit in the 2nd Cyclist Brigade of the 1st Cyclist Division in the Yoxford, Suffolk area. In November 1916, the 1st Cyclist Division was broken up and the regiment was amalgamated with the 2/1st Royal 1st Devon Yeomanry to form the 4th (Royal 1st Devon and North Devon) Yeomanry Cyclist Regiment, still with the 2nd Cyclist Brigade, in Norfolk. In March 1917 it resumed its identity as 2/1st Royal North Devon Yeomanry, still with the 2nd Cyclist Brigade, at Melton Constable before moving to East Dereham later in 1917. In May 1918 it went to Ireland with the 2nd Cyclist Brigade and was stationed at Longford until the end of the war.

==== 3/1st Royal North Devon Yeomanry ====
The 3rd Line regiment was formed at Barnstaple in 1915. In the summer it was affiliated to a Reserve Cavalry Regiment at Tidworth. In the summer of 1916 it was dismounted and attached to the 3rd Line Groups of the Wessex Division as its 1st Line was serving as infantry. Disbanded in early 1917 with personnel transferring to the 2nd Line regiment or to the 4th (Reserve) Battalion of the Devonshire Regiment at Bournemouth.

=== Post war ===
On 7 February 1920, the Regiment was reconstituted in the Territorial Army with HQ still at Barnstaple. Following the experience of the war, it was decided that only the fourteen most senior yeomanry regiments would be retained as horsed cavalry, with the rest being transferred to other roles. As a result, on 7 June 1920, the Regiment was amalgamated with the Royal 1st Devon Yeomanry to form the Royal Devon Yeomanry and simultaneously transferred to the Royal Artillery to form 11th (Devon) Army Brigade, RFA.

== Regimental museum ==
The Royal Devon Yeomanry Museum is incorporated in the Museum of Barnstaple and North Devon in The Square, Barnstaple.

== List of commanding officers ==
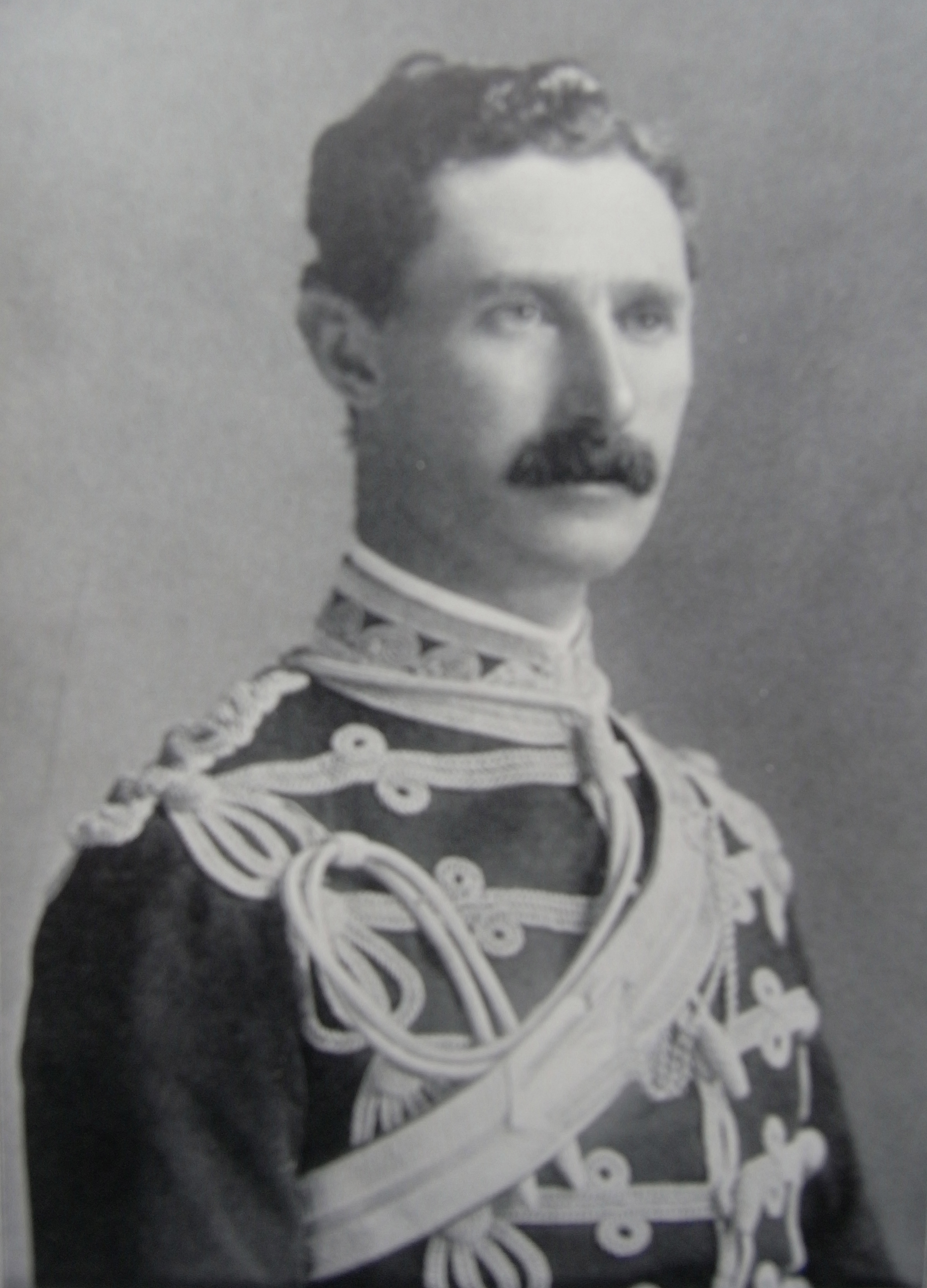
Hugh Fortescue, 4th Earl Fortescue (1854–1932), Honorary Colonel

Lieutenant Colonels of the North Devon Hussars included:

- Sir Robert Bourchier Sherard Wrey, 11th Baronet (1855-1917), of Tawstock Court.
- Hugh Fortescue, 4th Earl Fortescue (1854–1932), of Castle Hill, Filleigh (Honorary Colonel).
- Robert Sanders, 1st Baron Bayford (1867–1940).

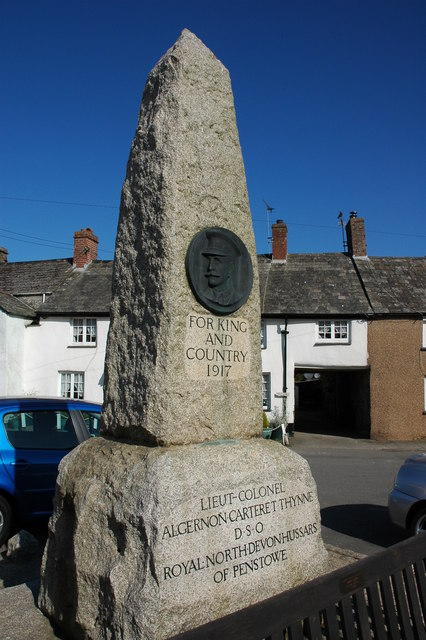
Granite obelisk monument to Lt-Col. Algernon Carteret Thynne (1868-1917), DSO, Kilkhampton, Cornwall

- Lt-Col. Algernon Carteret Thynne (1868-1917), DSO, of Penstowe in the parish of Kilkhampton, Cornwall, killed in action in Palestine during World War I, whose granite obelisk monument survives in the village centre of Kilkhampton with another within the parish church. He was a son of Francis John Thynne, of Haynes Park, Bedfordshire, lord of the manors of Kilkhampton, Stratton and Binhamy, the second son of Rev. Lord John Thynne (1798-1881), Deputy Dean of Westminster, 3rd son of Thomas Thynne, 2nd Marquess of Bath (1765–1837), a descendant of Lady Grace Grenville, a daughter of John Granville, 1st Earl of Bath (1628–1701) of Stowe House, Kilkhampton. His younger brother was Capt. George Augustus Carteret Thynne (1869-1945), Royal North Devon Yeomanry, who had descendants surviving in 1968.
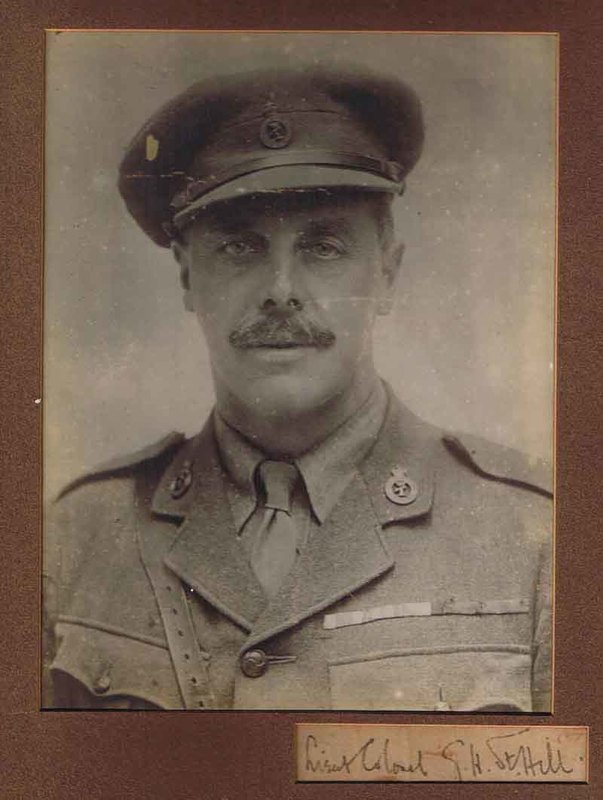
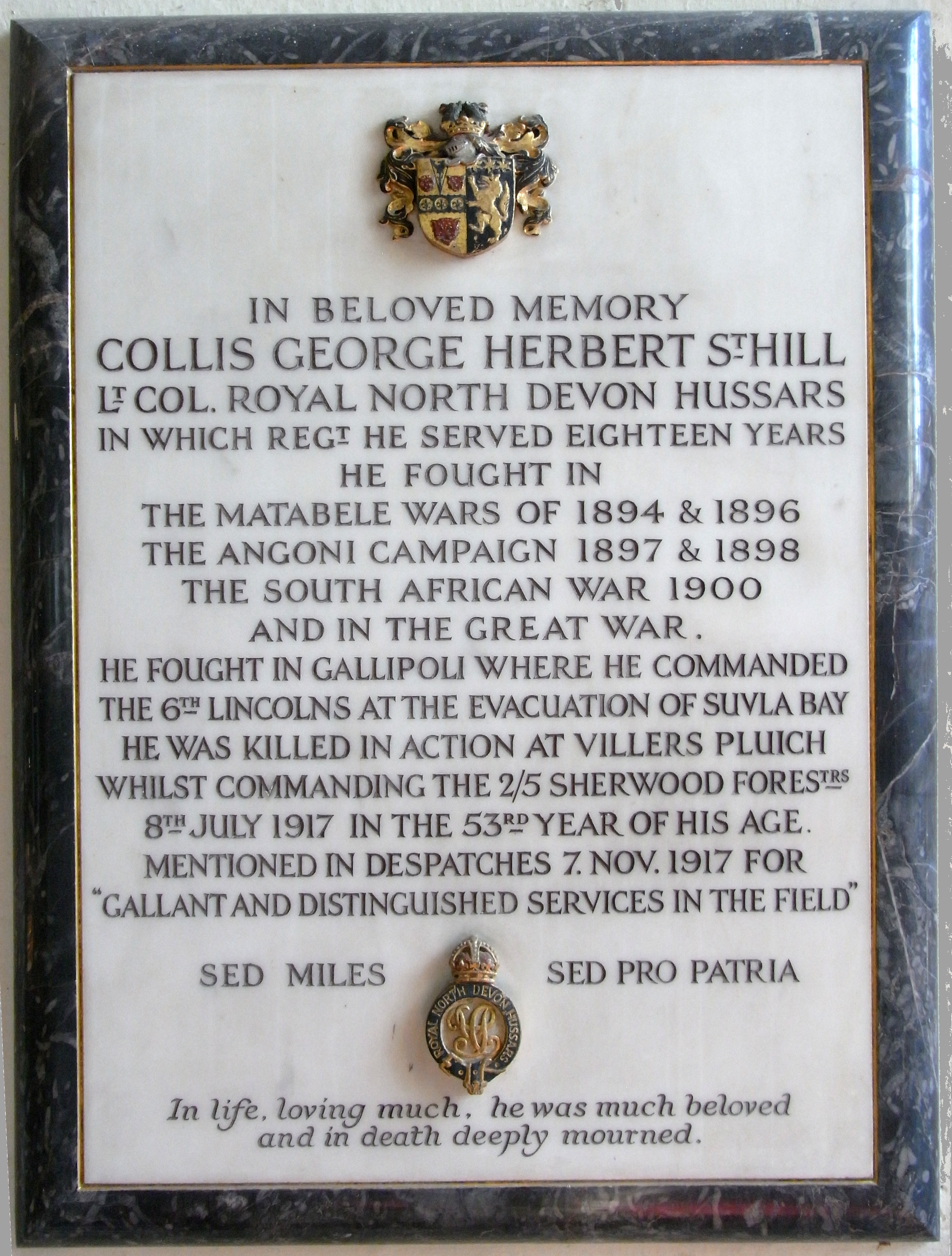
Lt Col. Collis George Herbert St. Hill (1865-1917); Mural monument in Bradninch Church, Devon
- Lt Col. Collis George Herbert St. Hill (1865–1917). Promoted Lt. Col. Royal North Devon Hussars, 16 June 1916. Killed in action 8 July 1917 at Villers-Plouich, Northern France, whilst commanding a battalion of the Sherwood Foresters; buried at Neuville-Bourjonval, near Ypres. He was the 2nd son of Rev. Canon Woodford St Hill of Hawkes Bay, New Zealand and was a grandson of Henry Charles St Hill, of Bradninch House in Devon, for many centuries the seat of that family (anciently spelled "Sainthill"). His mural monument exists in St Disen's Church, Bradninch. In 1899 he married Ammabel Wilson (d.1949), a daughter of Sir Spencer Maryon-Wilson, 10th Baronet of Charlton House, Kent.

== Battle honours ==
The Royal North Devon Yeomanry was awarded the following battle honours (honours in bold are emblazoned on the regimental colours):

Second Boer War	**South Africa 1900–01**
First World War	**Somme 1918**, **Bapaume 1918**, **Hindenburg Line**, **Épéhy**, **France and Flanders 1918**, **Gallipoli 1915**, **Egypt 1916–17**, **Gaza**, **Jerusalem**, **Tell 'Asur**, **Palestine 1917–18**

== See also ==
- Imperial Yeomanry
- List of Yeomanry Regiments 1908
- Yeomanry
- Yeomanry order of precedence
- British yeomanry during the First World War
- Second line yeomanry regiments of the British Army
- List of British Army Yeomanry Regiments converted to Royal Artillery
- North Devon Militia

== Bibliography ==
- Becke, Archibald F. (1936). Order of Battle of Divisions Part 2A. The Territorial Force Mounted Divisions and the 1st-Line Territorial Force Divisions (42–56). London: HMSO. OCLC 4405016.
- Becke, Archibald F. (1937). Order of Battle of Divisions Part 2B. The 2nd-Line Territorial Force Divisions (57th–69th) with The Home-Service Divisions (71st–73rd) and 74th and 75th Divisions. London: HMSO. OCLC 4405016.
- Becke, Archibald F. (1938). Order of Battle of Divisions Part 3A. New Army Divisions (9–26). London: HMSO. OCLC 4405016.
- James, Brigadier E.A. (1978). British Regiments 1914–18. London: Samson Books Limited. ISBN 0-906304-03-2.
- Mileham, Patrick (1994). The Yeomanry Regiments; 200 Years of Tradition. Edinburgh: Canongate Academic. ISBN 1-898410-36-4.
- Rinaldi, Richard A (2008). Order of Battle of the British Army 1914. Ravi Rikhye. ISBN 978-0-97760728-0.
- Westlake, Ray (1996). British Regiments at Gallipoli. Barnsley: Leo Cooper. ISBN 0-85052-511-X.
