= Royal 1st Devon Yeomanry =

- Active: 15 May 1794 – 7 June 1920
- Country: Kingdom of Great Britain (1794–1800); United Kingdom (1801–1920)
- Branch: British Army
- Type: Yeomanry
- Size: Regiment
- Garrison/HQ: Exeter
- Engagements: Second Boer War; First World War Gallipoli 1915 Egypt 1916–17 Palestine 1917–18 France and Flanders 1918

The Royal 1st Devon Yeomanry was a Yeomanry regiment of the British Army. First raised in 1794, it participated in the Second Boer War and the First World War before being amalgamated with the Royal North Devon Yeomanry in 1920 to form the Royal Devon Yeomanry.

== History ==
=== Formation and early history ===
Under threat of invasion by the French Revolutionary government from 1793, and with insufficient military forces to repulse such an attack, the British government under William Pitt the Younger decided in 1794 to increase the Militia and to form corps of volunteers for the defence of the country. The mounted arm of the volunteers became known as the "Gentlemen and Yeomanry Cavalry". The Royal 1st Devon Yeomanry was first raised on 15 May 1794 as 1st Devon Troop before being regimented in 1803 as the 1st Devonshire Yeomanry Cavalry. One of the main organisers of this force was Col. John Rolle, 1st Baron Rolle (1751-1842), of Stevenstone near Great Torrington, Devon.

Despite the end of the Napoleonic Wars in 1815, the Yeomanry was retained by the government "for Military Service in aid of the Civil Power" in the absence of organised police forces. The establishment of police forces (in London in 1829 and in the counties in 1855) reduced the need for Yeomanry to be called out. The last occasion was during the food riots in Devon in 1867 when 112 members of the 1st Devonshire Yeomanry Cavalry mustered in Exeter.

The unwillingness of the government to pay for the Yeomanry led to many corps (Note: Corps in this context meaning either an independent troop or a number of troops under a single command.) being disbanded in 1827–28. Twenty two corps were authorised to continue officially, and another sixteen were allowed to continue to serve without pay. Serving without pay from 1828 to 1831, the Regiment was never disbanded.

The regiment was renamed as the Royal 1st Devonshire Yeomanry Cavalry in 1871 with Headquarters at Exeter. On 1 April 1893, the troops were reorganised in squadrons.

=== Second Boer War ===
Due to the string of defeats during Black Week in December 1899, the British government realized they were going to need more troops than just the regular army, thus issuing a Royal Warrant on 24 December 1899 to allow volunteer forces serve in the Second Boer War. This warrant officially created the Imperial Yeomanry. The Royal Warrant asked standing Yeomanry regiments to provide service companies of approximately 115 men each. In addition to this, many British citizens (usually mid-upper class) volunteered to join the new regiment.

The Royal 1st Devonshire Yeomanry Cavalry and the Royal North Devon Hussars co-sponsored the 27th (Devonshire) Company of the 7th Battalion, Imperial Yeomanry which arrived in South Africa on 23 March 1900.

On 17 April 1901, the regiment was renamed as the Royal 1st Devon Imperial Yeomanry and reorganised in four squadrons and a machine gun section. On 1 April 1908, the regiment was renamed for the final time as the Royal 1st Devon Yeomanry and transferred to the Territorial Force, trained and equipped as hussars. The regiment was based at Dix's Field in Exeter at this time. (Note: The former regimental headquarters at No. 9 Dix's Field went on to become the YMCA before being bombed during the Second World War and then being demolished, along with many of the other houses in the terrace, in the 1950s.)

The regiment's organisation was:

	Royal 1st Devon Yeomanry
HQ	Exeter
A Squadron	Thorverton (detachments at Crediton, Tiverton, Rackenford, Cullompton, Bampton)
B Squadron	Ottery St Mary (detachments at Exmouth, Exeter, Axminster, Sidmouth, Dawlish)
C Squadron	Totnes (detachments at Moretonhampstead, Bovey Tracey, Newton Abbot, Dartmouth, Kingsbridge, Plymouth)
D Squadron	Bodmin (Cornwall) (detachments at Launceston, Camelford, Liskeard, Truro, Helston, Penzance (all in Cornwall))

It was ranked as 28th (of 55) in the order of precedence of the Yeomanry Regiments in the Army List of 1914.

=== First World War ===
In accordance with the Territorial and Reserve Forces Act 1907 (7 Edw. 7, c.9) which brought the Territorial Force into being, the TF was intended to be a home defence force for service during wartime and members could not be compelled to serve outside the country. However, on the outbreak of war on 4 August 1914, many members volunteered for Imperial Service. Therefore, TF units were split in August and September 1914 into 1st Line (liable for overseas service) and 2nd Line (home service for those unable or unwilling to serve overseas) units. Later, a 3rd Line was formed to act as a reserve, providing trained replacements for the 1st and 2nd Line regiments.

==== 1/1st Royal 1st Devon Yeomanry ====
At the outbreak of the First World War, the regiment was part of the 2nd South Western Mounted Brigade. It mobilised on 4 August 1914 and, with its brigade, moved to the Colchester area. It was dismounted in September 1915.

===== Gallipoli 1915 =====
Still with the 2nd South Western Mounted Brigade, in September 1915 the regiment left Colchester for Liverpool. On 24 September it boarded RMS Olympic and sailed the next day. It arrived at Mudros on 1 October and on to Suvla Bay. The regiment landed in Gallipoli on 9 October and was attached to the 11th (Northern) Division (digging trenches). In November it was in the firing line, attached to the 2nd Mounted Division and 53rd (Welsh) Infantry Division. On 19 December it was evacuated to Imbros.

===== Egypt 1916–17 =====
On 30 December 1915, the regiment landed in Alexandria to help defend Egypt. In February 1916, 2nd South Western Mounted Brigade was absorbed into the 2nd Dismounted Brigade (along with elements of the Highland and Lowland Mounted Brigades). It served on Suez Canal defences and part of the Western Frontier Force. On 4 January 1917, the regiment was amalgamated with the 1/1st Royal North Devon Yeomanry at Moascar, Egypt to form the 16th (Royal 1st Devon and Royal North Devon Yeomanry) Battalion, Devonshire Regiment and 2nd Dismounted Brigade became 229th Brigade in the 74th (Yeomanry) Division.

===== Palestine 1917–18 =====
With the 74th Division, it took part in the invasion of Palestine in 1917 and 1918. It fought in the Second and Third Battles of Gaza (including the capture of Beersheba and the Sheria Position). At the end of 1917, it took part in the capture and defence of Jerusalem and in March 1918 in the Battle of Tell 'Asur. On 3 April 1918, the Division was warned that it would move to France and by 30 April 1918 had completed embarkation at Alexandria.

===== France and Flanders 1918 =====
On 7 May 1918, 16th (Royal 1st Devon and Royal North Devon Yeomanry) Battalion, Devonshire Regiment landed at Marseille, France with 74th (Yeomanry) Division. It served in France and Flanders with the division for the rest of the war. From September 1918, as part of III Corps of Fourth Army, it took part in the Hundred Days Offensive including the Second Battle of the Somme (Second Battle of Bapaume) and the Battles of the Hindenburg Line (Battle of Épehy). In October and November 1918 it took part in the Final Advance in Artois and Flanders. By the Armistice it was east of Tournai, Belgium, still with 229th Brigade, 74th (Yeomanry) Division.

==== 2/1st Royal 1st Devon Yeomanry ====
The 2nd Line regiment was formed in September 1914 and stationed at Teignmouth. In May 1915 it joined 2/2nd South Western Mounted Brigade at Woodbury. In September 1915 it moved to Colchester, taking over the horses of the newly dismounted 1st Line regiment. On 31 March 1916, the remaining Mounted Brigades were ordered to be numbered in a single sequence; the brigade was numbered as 2nd Mounted Brigade and joined 1st Mounted Division. In April 1916 it went to Norfolk with its brigade and in July stationed at Thornton Park near Brentwood, Essex, still in 2nd Mounted Brigade, now in the new 1st Mounted Division.

In November 1916 it became a cyclist unit, returning to Norfolk and amalgamating with the 2/1st Royal North Devon Yeomanry to form the 4th (Royal 1st Devon and North Devon) Yeomanry Cyclist Regiment in the 2nd Cyclist Brigade. In March 1917 it resumed its identity as 2/1st Royal 1st Devon Yeomanry, still with the 2nd Cyclist Brigade, at Holt, Norfolk. It remained in the Holt area until May 1918 when it went to Ireland with the 2nd Cyclist Brigade and was stationed at the Curragh and Mullingar until the end of the war.

==== 3/1st Royal 1st Devon Yeomanry ====
The 3rd Line regiment was formed at Exeter in 1915. In the summer it was affiliated to a Reserve Cavalry Regiment at Tidworth Camp. In the summer of 1916 it was dismounted and attached to the 3rd Line Groups of the Wessex Division as its 1st Line was serving as infantry. Disbanded in early 1917 with personnel transferring to the 2nd Line regiment or to the 4th (Reserve) Battalion of the Devonshire Regiment at Bournemouth.

=== Postwar ===
On 7 February 1920, the Regiment was reconstituted in the Territorial Army with HQ still at Exeter. Following the experience of the war, it was decided that only the fourteen most senior yeomanry regiments would be retained as horsed cavalry, with the rest being transferred to other roles. As a result, on 7 June 1920, the Regiment was amalgamated with the Royal North Devon Yeomanry to form the Royal Devon Yeomanry and simultaneously transferred to the Royal Artillery to form 11th (Devon) Army Brigade, RFA.

== Regimental museum ==
The Royal Devon Yeomanry Museum is incorporated in the Museum of Barnstaple and North Devon in The Square, Barnstaple.

== Battle honours ==
The Royal 1st Devon Yeomanry was awarded the following battle honours (honours in bold are emblazoned on the regimental colours):

Second Boer War	**South Africa 1900–01**
First World War	**Somme 1918**, **Bapaume 1918**, **Hindenburg Line**, **Épéhy**, **France and Flanders 1918**, **Gallipoli 1915**, **Egypt 1916–17**, **Gaza**, **Jerusalem**, **Tell 'Asur**, **Palestine 1917–18**

== List of Colonels ==
- Col. Baldwin III Fulford (1801-1871) of Great Fulford, Devon.

== See also ==
- Imperial Yeomanry
- List of Yeomanry Regiments 1908
- Yeomanry
- Yeomanry order of precedence
- British yeomanry during the First World War
- Second line yeomanry regiments of the British Army
- List of British Army Yeomanry Regiments converted to Royal Artillery

== Bibliography ==
- Becke, Archibald F. (1936). Order of Battle of Divisions Part 2A. The Territorial Force Mounted Divisions and the 1st-Line Territorial Force Divisions (42–56). London: HMSO. OCLC 4405016.
- Becke, Archibald F. (1937). Order of Battle of Divisions Part 2B. The 2nd-Line Territorial Force Divisions (57th–69th) with The Home-Service Divisions (71st–73rd) and 74th and 75th Divisions. London: HMSO. OCLC 4405016.
- Becke, Archibald F. (1938). Order of Battle of Divisions Part 3A. New Army Divisions (9–26). London: HMSO. OCLC 4405016.
- James, Brigadier E.A. (1978). British Regiments 1914–18. London: Samson Books Limited. ISBN 0-906304-03-2.
- Mileham, Patrick (1994). The Yeomanry Regiments; 200 Years of Tradition. Edinburgh: Canongate Academic. ISBN 1-898410-36-4.
- Rinaldi, Richard A (2008). Order of Battle of the British Army 1914. Ravi Rikhye. ISBN 978-0-97760728-0.
- Westlake, Ray (1996). British Regiments at Gallipoli. Barnsley: Leo Cooper. ISBN 0-85052-511-X.
