= 229th Brigade =

2nd Dismounted Brigade 229th Brigade
- Brigade insignia while part of the 74th Division
- Active: February 1916 – July 1919
- Country: United Kingdom
- Branch: British Army
- Type: Dismounted Yeomanry
- Size: Brigade
- Part of: 74th (Yeomanry) Division
- Engagements: First World War; Egypt 1916–17; Palestine 1917–18; France and Flanders 1918; Battle of Jerusalem

The 2nd Dismounted Brigade was a formation of the British Army in the First World War. It was formed in Egypt in February 1916 by absorbing the Highland Mounted Brigade and the 2nd South Western Mounted Brigade. In October it absorbed the remnants of the 1st Dismounted Brigade. The brigade served as part of the Western Frontier Force and the Suez Canal Defences.

In January 1917, the brigade was reorganized and redesignated as the 229th Brigade and joined the 74th (Yeomanry) Division in March. It served with the division in the Sinai and Palestine Campaign and on the Western Front.

== 2nd Dismounted Brigade ==
=== Formation ===
The 2nd Dismounted Brigade was formed in Egypt in February 1916 by absorbing the Highland Mounted Brigade and the 2nd South Western Mounted Brigade.

The Highland Mounted Brigade had served dismounted in the Gallipoli Campaign from 26 September to 19 December 1915 assigned to the 2nd Mounted Division. Similarly, the 2nd South Western Mounted Brigade served in Gallipoli from 9 October until 19 December 1915 attached at various times to 11th (Northern) Division, 2nd Mounted Division and 53rd (Welsh) Infantry Division. Both brigades were withdrawn to Egypt in December 1915 and formed part of the Western Frontier Force. The 2nd Dismounted Brigade was formed as part of the Western Frontier Force with the following composition:

- 1/1st Royal 1st Devon Yeomanry
- 1/1st Royal North Devon Yeomanry
- 1/1st West Somerset Yeomanry
- 1/1st Fife and Forfar Yeomanry
- 1/1st Lovat Scouts
- 1/2nd Lovat Scouts
- 2nd Dismounted Brigade Machine Gun Company (Note: Redesignated as 4th Machine Gun Company on 14 January 1917.)
- Highland Mounted Brigade Signal Troop
- 2nd South Western Mounted Brigade Signal Troop
- 1st Highland Mounted Brigade Field Ambulance, RAMC
- 2nd South Western Mounted Brigade Field Ambulance, RAMC

=== Reorganised ===
On 27 September 1916, the 1/1st and 1/2nd Lovat Scouts (along with a company of the 1/3rd Scottish Horse) were merged to form the 10th (Lovat's Scouts) Battalion, Queen's Own Cameron Highlanders at Cairo. The battalion was transferred to Salonika, arriving 20 October, where it joined 82nd Brigade, 27th Division.

On 1 October 1916, 1/1st Scottish Horse and 1/2nd Scottish Horse of the 1st Dismounted Brigade were amalgamated to form 13th (Scottish Horse Yeomanry) Battalion, Black Watch. As the 1st Dismounted Brigade had now been reduced to just two regiments (1/1st Ayrshire Yeomanry and 1/1st Lanarkshire Yeomanry), it was dissolved and the remaining elements absorbed into the 2nd Dismounted Brigade.

The brigade served as part of the Western Frontier Force and on the Suez Canal Defences.

== 229th Brigade ==
The brigade was with the Suez Canal Defences when, on 14 January 1917, Egyptian Expeditionary Force (EEF) Order No. 26 instructed that the 2nd, 3rd and 4th Dismounted Brigades be reorganized as the 229th, 230th and 231st Brigades. Consequently, the 2nd Dismounted Brigade was redesignated 229th Brigade at el Ferdan (near Ismailia) on 15 January. The brigade units were reorganized in January 1917:

- 16th (Royal 1st Devon and Royal North Devon Yeomanry) Battalion, Devonshire Regiment (Note: 1/1st Royal 1st Devon Yeomanry and the 1/1st Royal North Devon Yeomanry were amalgamated on 4 January 1917 (antedated, 21 December 1916) and designated 16th Devonshire Regiment in February.)
- 12th (West Somerset Yeomanry) Battalion, Somerset Light Infantry (Note: 1/1st West Somerset Yeomanry was reorganized on 4 January and redesignated 12th Somerset Light Infantry on 8 February.)
- 12th (Ayrshire and Lanarkshire Yeomanry) Battalion, Royal Scots Fusiliers (Note: 1/1st Ayrshire Yeomanry and the 1/1st Lanarkshire Yeomanry were amalgamated on 4 January 1917 and designated 12th Royal Scots Fusiliers in February.)
- 14th (Fife and Forfar Yeomanry) Battalion, Black Watch (Note: 1/1st Fife and Forfar Yeomanry was reorganized on 14 January (antedated, 21 December 1916) and redesignated 14th Black Watch in January.)
- 4th Machine Gun Company (Note: 2nd Dismounted Brigade Machine Gun Company redesignated on 14 January.)
- 229th Trench Mortar Battery (Note: Formed in the brigade on 22 May 1917.)
- 229th Field Ambulance (Note: 1st Highland and 2nd South Western Mounted Brigade Field Ambulances were amalgamated as 229th Field Ambulance on 14 January 1917.)

On 23 February, the GOC EEF (Lt-Gen Sir A.J. Murray) sought permission from the War Office to form the 229th, 230th and 231st Brigades into a new division. The War Office granted permission and the new 74th (Yeomanry) Division started to form. The 229th Brigade joined the division at el Arish between 7 and 9 March. 229th Brigade remained with 74th (Yeomanry) Division for the rest of the war.

=== Palestine 1917–1918 ===
With the 74th Division, the brigade took part in the invasion of Palestine in 1917 and 1918. It fought in the Second and Third Battles of Gaza (including the capture of Beersheba and the Sheria Position). At the end of 1917, it took part in the capture and defence of Jerusalem and in March 1918 in the Battle of Tell 'Asur. On 3 April 1918, the Division was warned that it would move to France and by 30 April 1918 had completed embarkation at Alexandria.

Before departure for France, the 4th Machine Gun Company joined 209th (of 230th Brigade), 210th (of 231st Brigade) and 261st MG Companies to form 74th Battalion, Machine Gun Corps. It concentrated at Alexandria between 17 and 30 April and departed for France with the division on the latter date.

=== France and Flanders 1918 ===
In May 1918, the brigade landed at Marseille, France with 74th (Yeomanry) Division. It served in France and Flanders with the division for the rest of the war. By 18 May, the division had concentrated around Rue in the Abbeville area. Here the dismounted Yeomanry underwent training for service on the Western Front, particularly gas defence.

Due to a lack of replacements, British (Note: As distinct from the Australian, Canadian and the New Zealand divisions which remained on a 12-battalion basis.) infantry divisions on the Western Front had been reduced from 12 to 9 battalions in January and February 1918. To conform with this new structure, on 21 June, 12th Royal Scots Fusiliers, 12th Norfolk Regiment (of 230th Brigade) and 24th Royal Welsh Fusiliers (of 231st Brigade) left 74th (Yeomanry) Division. They were used to reconstitute 94th Brigade of 31st Division which was renamed 94th (Yeomanry) Brigade on that date.

On 14 July 1918 the Yeomanry Division went into the line for the first time, near Merville on the right of XI Corps. From September 1918, as part of III Corps of Fourth Army, it took part in the Hundred Days Offensive including the Second Battle of the Somme (Second Battle of Bapaume) and the Battles of the Hindenburg Line (Battle of Épehy). In October and November 1918 it took part in the Final Advance in Artois and Flanders. By the Armistice it was east of Tournai, Belgium, still with 74th (Yeomanry) Division.

With the end of the war, the troops of 74th Division were engaged in railway repair work and education was undertaken while demobilisation began. The division and its subformations were disbanded on 10 July 1919.

=== Commanders ===
The 2nd Dismounted Brigade / 229th Brigade had the following commanders during its existence:

From	Rank	Name
February 1916	Brigadier-General	R. Hoare (wounded, 9 September 1918)
9 September 1918	Lieutenant-Colonel	C.J.H. Spence-Jones (acting)
11 September 1918	Brigadier-General	F.S. Thackeray

Colonel R. Hoare (promoted to Brigadier-General on 5 August 1914) was the commander of the 2nd South Western Mounted Brigade from 1 April 1912. He took command of 2nd Dismounted Brigade on formation. Reginald Hoare was born 18 September 1865, 13th of 14 children all of whom survived into old age, educated at Eton and Sandhurst and in 1886 commissioned into the 4th Queens Own Hussars, which was posted to India along with a new bumptious subaltern called Winston Churchill. In 1899 the 4 QOH won the India Polo Cup in a team captained by RH, by then a Major having been Adjutant, and which included WSC (see My Early Life: WSC.) RH missed Boer War 1 having badly broken his leg in a riding accident but went out to Boer War II as ADC to Gen Elliott and for the last 6 months commanded his own column trying to hunt down de Witt. From 1905 -1909 he commanded 4 QOH serving in Ireland and S Africa, after which he was an inspector of cavalry being no mean horseman. In 1912 he received command of the S W Yeomanry Brigade of which the RNDY had been lately commanded by his 4th eldest brother Wilson Hoare who died in harness in 1911 (born 2 August 1854, Times obit 21 January 1911) and had had an earlier career in the Royal Navy. Having trained the Brigade he served the whole war with it, Gallipoli 1915, defence of Suez and Egypt 1916, Palestine 1917, and the Western Front. Wounded in Sept 1918 by a sniping gun firing at a cross roads when going up to the front on his horse to be with his brigade, he was evacuated back to London and with the end of hostilities there was no brigade to return to nor train so retirement followed. He was convalesced enough to marry in October 1918 Violet Eliza Reid Walker (14 May 1887 – 1 Oct 1966), elder daughter of John & Katie Reid Walker (John of the Walker brewing family in Warrington and Burton and a successful breeder (2 Ascot Gold Plates running with Invershin) of bloodstock and polo ponies with stock brought in from Syria.) RH and VERH had 4 children. RH died after an operation in October 1947 and is buried at Dalarassie, Tomatin, Inverness. Awarded CMG, DSO, Order of St Stanislas 2nd class (Russian, before 1917.)

== See also ==
- 1st Dismounted Brigade
- Highland Mounted Brigade
- Lowland Mounted Brigade
- 2nd South Western Mounted Brigade
- British yeomanry during the First World War

== Bibliography ==
- Becke, Archibald F. (1936). Order of Battle of Divisions Part 2A. The Territorial Force Mounted Divisions and the 1st-Line Territorial Force Divisions (42–56). London: HMSO. OCLC 4405016.
- Becke, Archibald F. (1937). Order of Battle of Divisions Part 2B. The 2nd-Line Territorial Force Divisions (57th–69th) with The Home-Service Divisions (71st–73rd) and 74th and 75th Divisions. London: HMSO. OCLC 4405016.
- Becke, Archibald F. (1938). Order of Battle of Divisions Part 3A. New Army Divisions (9–26). London: HMSO. OCLC 4405016.
- Becke, Archibald F. (1945). Order of Battle of Divisions Part 3B. New Army Divisions (30-41) & 63rd (R.N.) Division. London: HMSO. OCLC 4405016.
- Haythornthwaite, Philip J. (1996). The World War One Source Book. London: Arms and Armour Press. ISBN 1-85409-351-7.
- James, Brigadier E.A. (1978). British Regiments 1914–18. London: Samson Books Limited. ISBN 0-906304-03-2.
