= Bear Street drill hall =

Building in Barnstaple, Devon, England

- Barnstaple
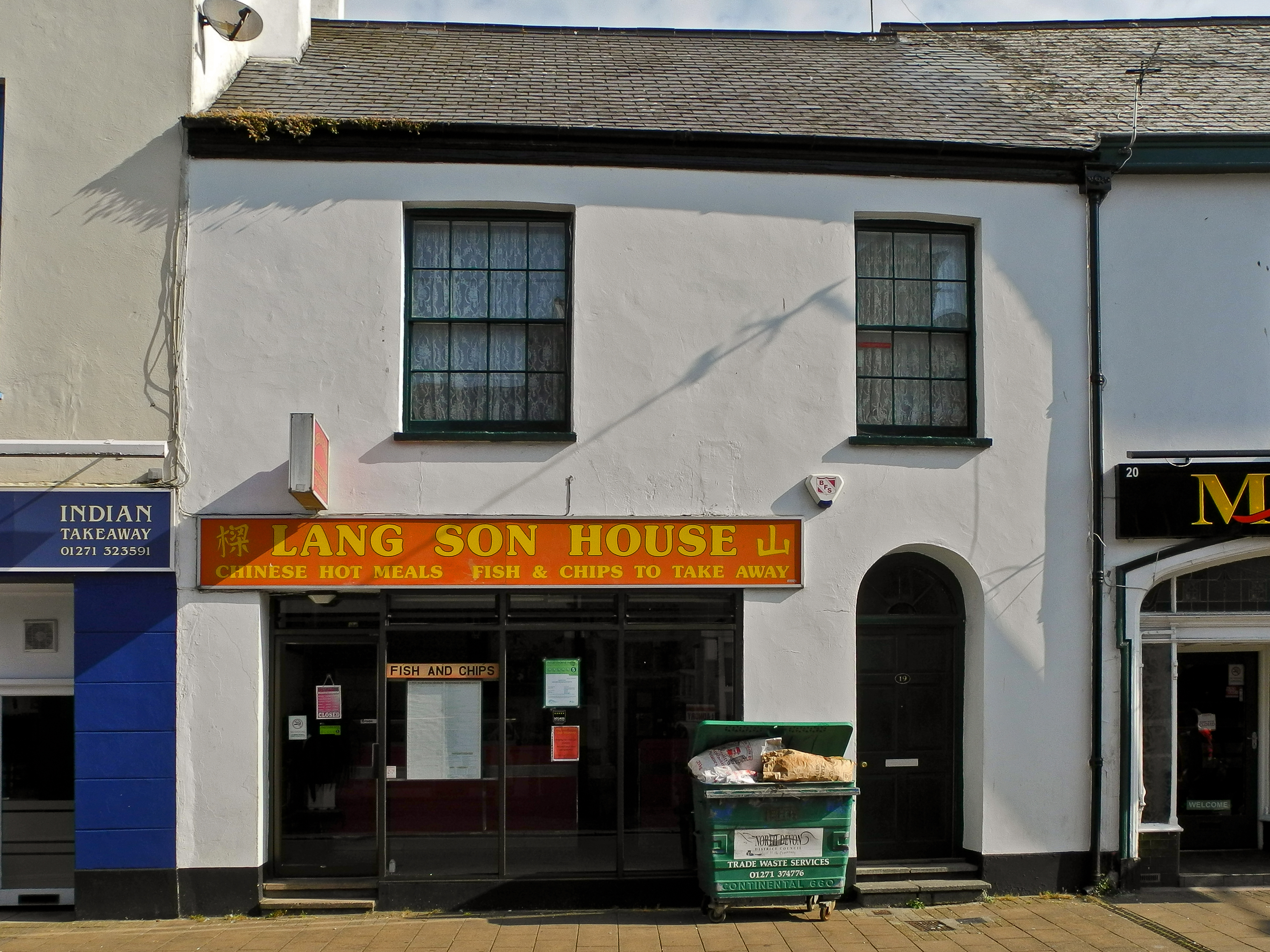
- Bear Street drill hall

Site information
- Type: Drill hall

Location
- Location within Devon
- Coordinates: 51.08123°N 4.05596°W

Site history
- Built: Early 19th century
- Built for: War Office
- In use: Early 19th century - 1920

The Bear Street drill hall is a former military installation in Barnstaple, Devon. It is a Grade II listed building.

== History ==
The building was completed in the early 19th century. It became the headquarters of the Royal North Devon Yeomanry in the late 19th century. The regiment was mobilised at the drill hall in August 1914 before being deployed to Gallipoli and, ultimately, to the Western Front. In 1920 the regiment amalgamated with the Royal 1st Devon Yeomanry to form the Royal Devon Yeomanry at Exeter and the drill hall was decommissioned and converted for retail use.
