= Somerset Yeomanry =

Somerset Yeomanry may refer to:

- North Somerset Yeomanry
- West Somerset Yeomanry
