= 2nd Mounted Brigade (United Kingdom) =

2/2nd South Western Mounted Brigade 2nd Mounted Brigade
- Active: 1914–1916
- Country: United Kingdom
- Branch: British Army
- Type: Yeomanry
- Size: Brigade
- Engagements: First World War

The 2nd Mounted Brigade previously known as the 2/2nd South Western Mounted Brigade was a second line yeomanry brigade of the British Army during the First World War.

Raised after the declaration of war, it was a mirror formation of the first line 2nd South Western Mounted Brigade. It had under command the 2/1st Royal 1st Devon Yeomanry, the 2/1st Royal North Devon Yeomanry, and the 2/1st West Somerset Yeomanry. All of which were converted in cyclist units in 1916 or 1917 and the brigade, never having seen any active service, ceased to exist.

== See also ==
- 2nd South Western Mounted Brigade for the 1st Line formation
- British yeomanry during the First World War
- Second line yeomanry regiments of the British Army
