= 11th (Northern) Division =

British Army division in WWI

- "Ankh" Insignia of the 11th (Northern) Division
- Active: 21 August 1914 – 28 June 1919
- Country: United Kingdom
- Branch: British Army
- Type: Infantry
- Size: Division
- Engagements: First World War: Gallipoli Campaign; Western Front

The 11th (Northern) Division, was an infantry division of the British Army during the First World War, raised from men who had volunteered for Lord Kitchener's New Armies. The division fought in the Gallipoli Campaign and on the Western Front. The division's insignia was an ankh or ankhus.

== History ==
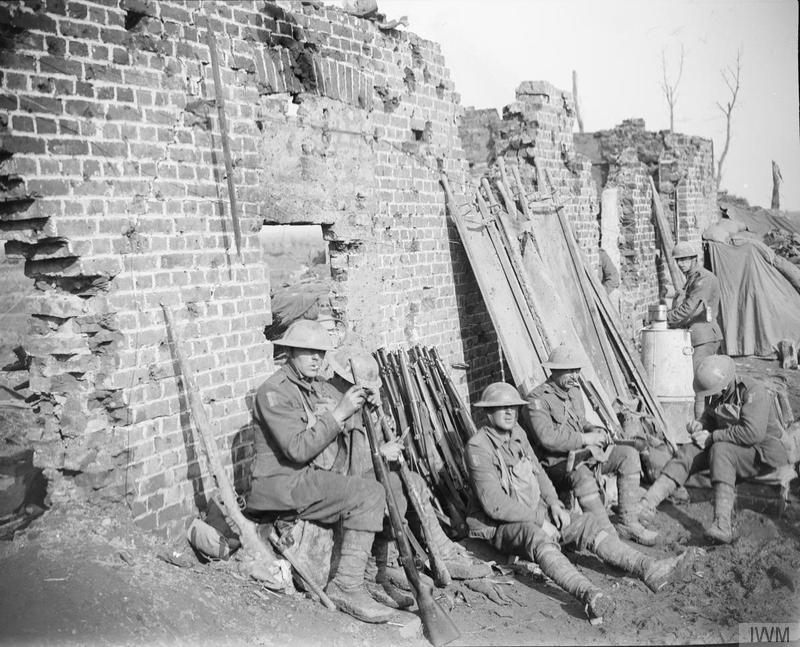
Tommies of the 5th (Service) Battalion, Dorsetshire Regiment, resting and cleaning rifles in the ruins of a farm near Langemarcke, Belgium, 17 October 1917.

The division came into existence on 21 August 1914 under Army Order No. 324, which authorised the formation of the first six new divisions of Kitchener's Army. The division, commanded by Major General Frederick Hammersley, was composed of early wartime volunteers and assembled at Belton Park near Grantham.

By mid-1915, the recruits were judged to be ready for active service, and the division sailed for the Mediterranean in June-July 1915. As part of the Suvla Bay landing force, it reinforced the British expeditionary force at Gallipoli, on 7 August. The 6th (Service) Battalion, Alexandra, Princess of Wales Own (Yorkshire Regiment) (32nd Brigade) was the first "Kitchener unit" to be involved in a major offensive operation of the war. Its action at Lala Baba Hill, on 7 August, was costly: all but three of its officers were killed, including the battalion's commanding officer, Colonel E. H. Chapman, were killed. Afterwards the hill was known to the Allies as York Hill. The division continued to serve at Gallipoli, suffering high casualties, until the evacuation of Suvla in December 1915. It then spent a period of time in Egypt, guarding the Suez Canal.

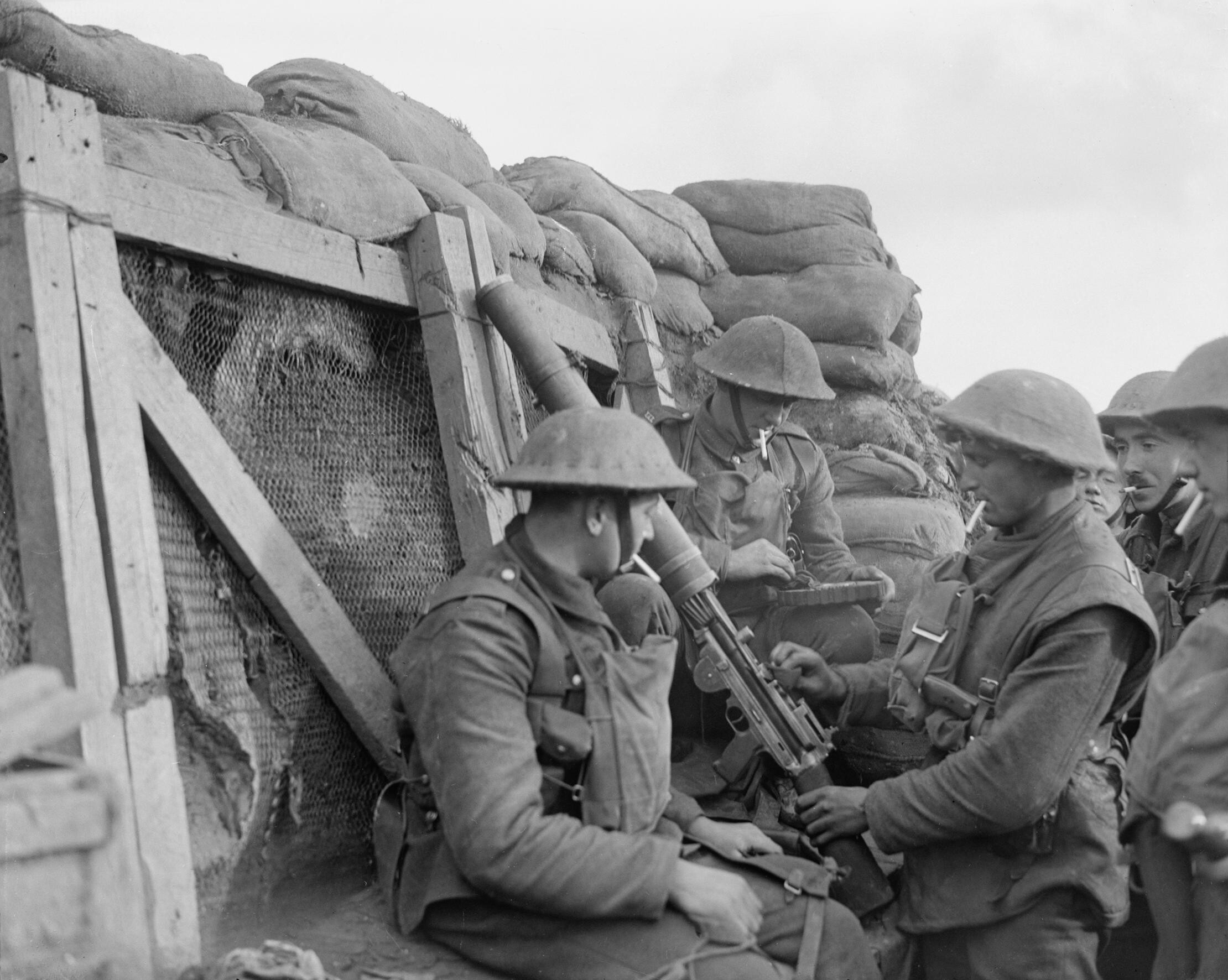
Infantrymen of the 6th (Service) Battalion, York and Lancaster Regiment, at a Lewis gun post, on the front line near Cambrin, Pas-de-Calais, France, 6 February 1918.

The division, now under Major General Edward Fanshawe, was transferred to France in mid-1916 and saw action in the Battle of the Somme. It remained on the Western Front until the armistice of 11 November 1918, by which time Major General Henry Rodolph Davies was in command.

On 28 June 1919, exactly five years since the assassination of Archduke Franz Ferdinand of Austria which started the conflict, the 11th (Northern) Division was officially disbanded, having sustained more than 32,100 casualties during the First World War.

== Order of battle ==
The division comprised the following units and formations:

32nd Brigade

- 9th Battalion, Prince of Wales's Own (West Yorkshire Regiment) – absorbed 1/1st Yorkshire Hussars October 1917 and became 9th (Yorkshire Hussars) Battalion, West Yorkshire Regiment
- 6th Battalion, East Yorkshire Regiment – became divisional pioneers 18 January 1915
- 6th Battalion, Alexandra, Princess of Wales Own (Yorkshire Regiment) (Green Howards) – absorbed into 2nd Battalion 16 May 1918
- 8th Battalion, Duke of Wellington's (West Riding Regiment) – from 34 Bde 18 January 1915; disbanded and drafted February 1918
- 6th Battalion, York and Lancaster Regiment
- 2nd Battalion, Green Howards – joined from 30th Division 14 May 1918
- 32nd Brigade Machine Gun Company – formed March 1916; joined 11th Battalion, Machine Gun Corps (MGC), 28 February 1918
- 32nd Brigade Trench Mortar Battery – joined July 1917

33rd Brigade

- 6th Battalion, Lincolnshire Regiment
- 6th Battalion, Border Regiment – disbanded and drafted February 1918
- 7th Battalion, South Staffordshire Regiment
- 9th Battalion, Sherwood Foresters (Nottingham and Derbyshire Regiment)
- 5th Battalion, Dorsetshire Regiment– from Army Troops; to 34 Bde 18 January 1915
- 33rd Brigade Machine Gun Company – formed March 1916; joined 11th Battalion MGC 28 February 1918
- 33rd Brigade Trench Mortar Battery – joined July 1917

34th Brigade

- 8th Battalion, Northumberland Fusiliers
- 9th Battalion, Lancashire Fusiliers – disbanded and drafted February 1918
- 8th Battalion, Duke of Wellington's Regiment – to 32 Bde 18 January 1915
- 11th Battalion, Manchester Regiment
- 5th Battalion, Dorsetshire Regiment – from 33 Bde 18 January 1915
- 34th Brigade Machine Gun Company – formed March 1916; joined 11th Battalion MGC 28 February 1918
- 34th Brigade Trench Mortar Battery – joined July 1917

1/2nd South-Western Mounted Brigade

(Serving dismounted) – attached at Suvla 9 October to 15 November 1915

- 1/1st Royal 1st Devon Yeomanry
- 1/1st Royal North Devon Yeomanry
- 1/1st West Somerset Yeomanry
- 1/2nd South-Western Signal Troop, Royal Engineers (RE)
- 1/2nd South-Western Field Ambulance, Royal Army Medical Corps (RAMC)

Divisional Mounted Troops

- 11th Divisional Cyclist Company, Army Cyclist Corps – formed January–March 1915; to VI Corps Cyclist Battalion 12 July 1916
- B Squadron, 1/1st Hertfordshire Yeomanry – joined 4 April 1916 in Egypt; to VI Corps in France 12 July 1916

Divisional Royal Artillery

- LVIII Brigade, Royal Field Artillery (RFA)
  - 184, 185, 186 Batteries – 6-gun batteries reorganised by February 1915 as 4-gun batteries designated A, B, C and D
  - LVIII Brigade Ammunition Column (BAC)
- LIX Brigade, RFA
  - 187, 188, 189 Batteries – A, B, C, D by February 1915
  - LIX BAC
- LX Brigade, RFA
  - 190, 191, 192 Batteries – A, B, C, D by February 1915
  - LX BAC
- LXI (Howitzer) Brigade, RFA – remained in England when division went to Gallipoli; later joined Guards Division
  - 193 (H), 194 (H), 195 (H) Batteries – A, B, C, D by February 1915
  - LIX (H) BAC
- 11th Divisional Ammunition Column – remained in England when division went to Gallipoli
- 1st Hull Heavy Battery, Royal Garrison Artillery (RGA) and Ammunition Column – redesignated 11th (Hull) Heavy Battery May 1915; remained in England when division went to Gallipoli; later went to East Africa

Also attached:

- LV Brigade, RFA – attached from 10th (Irish) Division at Suvla until the evacuation
- LVII (H) Brigade, RFA – attached from 10th (Irish) Division at Suvla until the evacuation
- IV Lowland (H) Brigade, RFA (TF) – attached from 52nd (Lowland) Division at Suvla until the evacuation
- IV Highland (Mountain) Brigade, RGA (TF) – attached from 29th Division at Suvla until the evacuation
- 10th Heavy Battery, RGA – attached from 10th (Irish) Division at Suvla until the evacuation
- 91st Heavy Battery, RGA – attached in England; detached at Gallipoli and landed at Cape Helles

After 1916 reorganisations

- LVIII Brigade, RFA
  - A, B, C Batteries
  - D Battery – became A (H) Battery, CXXXIII (H) Brigade 26 April 1916
- LIX Brigade, RFA
  - A, B, C Batteries
  - D Battery – became B (H) Battery, CXXXIII (H) Brigade 26 April 1916
- LX Brigade, RFA – broken up 25 January 1917
  - A, B, C Batteries
  - D Battery – became CXXXIII BAC 26 April 1916
- CXXXIII (Howitzer) Brigade, RFA – formed in 26 April 1916 as 'The Howitzer Brigade, RFA', renamed 31 May 1916; broken up between LVIII and LIX Brigades November–December 1916
  - A (H) Battery – from LVIII Brigade 26 April 1916
  - B (H) Battery – from LIX Brigade 26 April 1916
  - CXXXIII BAC – from LX Brigade 26 April; became C (H) Battery 22 June; broken up between A (H) and B (H) Batteries 29 August 1916
  - 501 (H) Battery – joined 15, left 27 November 1916
- CXVIII (H) Brigade, RFA – joined from 1st Canadian Division 15 July 1916 and broken up
  - 458 (H) Battery – became D (H) Battery, LVIII Brigade
  - 459 (H) Battery – became D (H) Battery, LIX Brigade
  - 461 (H) Battery – became D (H) Battery, LX Brigade
- X/11, Y/11, Z/11 Medium Trench Mortar Batteries – joined 9 August 1916
- 11th Divisional Ammunition Column – rejoined in France 7 July 1916 and absorbed BACs

After Winter 1916–17 reorganisation

- LVIII Brigade, RFA
  - A, B, C, D (H) Batteries
- LIX Brigade, RFA
  - A, B, C, D (H) Batteries
- X/11 Medium Trench Mortar Battery
- Y/11 Medium Trench Mortar Battery
- Z/11 Medium Trench Mortar Battery – absorbed by X/11 and Y/11 on 3 February 1918
- V/11 Heavy Trench Mortar Battery – left February 1918

Divisional Royal Engineers

- 67th Field Company, RE
- 68th Field Company, RE
- 68th Field Company, RE – joined from 21st Division 7 February 1915
- 11th Divisional Signal Company, RE

Divisional Pioneers

- 6th Battalion, East Yorkshire Regiment

Divisional Machine Gun Troops

- 11 Divisional Motor Machine Gun Company – joined 9 June 1915; remained in England when division went to Gallipoli
- 250th Machine Gun Company, MGC - joined 16 November 1917
- 11th Battalion, MGC – formed 28 February 1918
  - 32nd, 33rd, 34th, 250th MG Companies

Divisional Medical Services

- 33rd Field Ambulance, Royal Army Medical Corps (RAMC)
- 34th Field Ambulance, RAMC
- 35th Field Ambulance, RAMC
- 22nd Mobile Veterinary Section, Army Veterinary Corps
- 21st Sanitary Section – joined in Egypt; joined IV Corps 9 December 1916

Divisional Transport

- 11th Divisional Train, Army Service Corps (ASC) – remained in England when division went to Gallipoli; later joined 26th Division in Salonika
  - 112th, 113th, 114th 115th Companies, ASC
- 11 Divisional Motor Ambulance Workshop – remained in England when division went to Gallipoli and absorbed into Divisional Train
- 11th Divisional Train, ASC – former 53rd (Welsh) Divisional Train left in England; joined 6 July 1916
  - 479th, 480th, 481st, 482nd Companies, ASC

== Commanders ==
The following officers served as General Officer Commanding:

- Major General Frederick Hammersley (August 1914 – August 1915)
- Major General Sir Edward Fanshawe (August 1915 – July 1916)
- Lieutenant General Sir Charles Woollcombe (July–December 1916)
- Brigadier-General J. Erskine (acting) (December 1916)
- Major General Archibald Ritchie (wounded in action) (December 1916 – May 1917)
- Major General Henry Davies (wounded in action) (May 1917 – September 1918)
- Brigadier General Sir Ormonde Winter (acting) (September 1918)
- Major-General H. Davies (September–October 1918)

== Battles ==
The division took part in the following actions:

Gallipoli Campaign
1915

- Battle of Suvla (in IX Corps)
  - Landing at Suvla Bay, 6–15 August
  - Capture of Karakol Dagh (34th Bde), 7 August
  - Battle of Scimitar Hill, 21 August
  - Attack on 'W' Hills, 21 August
  - Evacuation of Suvla, night 19/20 December

Western Front
1916

- Battle of the Somme (in II Corps, Reserve Army)
  - Capture of the Wonder Work (32nd Bde) 14 September
  - Battle of Flers–Courcelette, 15–22 September
  - Battle of Thiepval Ridge, 26–28 September

1917

- Operations on the Aisne, 11–19 January (in IV Corps, Fifth Army)
- Battle of Messines, 9–14 June (in IX Corps, Second Army)
- Third Battle of Ypres (in XVIII Corps, Fifth Army)
  - Battle of Langemarck, 16–18 August
  - Fighting around St Julien, 19, 22 & 27 August
  - Battle of Polygon Wood, 26 September–3 October
  - Battle of Broodseinde, 4 October
  - Battle of Poelcappelle, 9 October

1918

- Second Battle of Arras (in XXII Corps, First Army)
  - Battle of the Scarpe, 30 August
  - Battle of the Drocourt-Quéant Line, 2–3 September
- Battles of the Hindenburg Line (in Canadian Corps, First Army)
  - Battle of the Canal du Nord, 27 September–1 October
  - Battle of Cambrai, 8–9 September
  - Pursuit to the Selle, 9–12 October
- The Final Advance in Picardy (in XXII Corps, First Army)
  - Battle of the Sambre, 4 November
  - Passage of the Grande Honnelle, 5–7 November

== See also ==
- List of British divisions in World War I
