= 2nd South Western Mounted Brigade =

- Active: 1908–February 1916
- Country: United Kingdom
- Branch: British Army
- Type: Yeomanry
- Size: Brigade
- HQ (peacetime): Exeter
- Engagements: World War I Gallipoli 1915 Egypt 1916

The 2nd South Western Mounted Brigade was a formation of the Territorial Force of the British Army, organised in 1908. After service in the Gallipoli Campaign and in the defence of Egypt, it was absorbed into the 2nd Dismounted Brigade in February 1916.

== Formation ==
Under the terms of the Territorial and Reserve Forces Act 1907 (7 Edw.7, c.9), the brigade was formed in 1908 as part of the Territorial Force. It consisted of three yeomanry regiments, a horse artillery battery and ammunition column, a transport and supply column and a field ambulance.

As the name suggests, the units were drawn from South West England, predominantly Devon and Somerset, but also a sub-unit from Cornwall.

== World War I ==
The brigade was mobilised on 4 August 1914 at the outbreak of the First World War and moved to the Colchester area of Essex in August 1914 where it remained (under Third Army of Central Force) until September 1915. It was then dismounted, with the horses being taken over by its 2nd Line 2/2nd South Western Mounted Brigade which replaced it in the Home Defence role.

=== Gallipoli ===
In September 1915 the brigade left Essex for Liverpool. On 24 September it boarded RMS Olympic and sailed the next day. It arrived at Mudros on 1 October and on to Suvla Bay. The Brigade landed in Gallipoli on 9 October and was attached to the 11th (Northern) Division (digging trenches). In November it was in the firing line, attached to the 2nd Mounted Division and 53rd (Welsh) Infantry Division. On 19 December it was evacuated to Imbros. In this period, the brigade consisted of the three yeomanry regiments, a signal troop and a field ambulance under the command of Br.-Gen. R. Hoare.

=== Egypt ===
In late December 1915, the brigade landed in Alexandria to help defend Egypt. It served on Suez Canal defences and as part of the Western Frontier Force.

In February 1916, 2nd South Western Mounted Brigade was absorbed into the 2nd Dismounted Brigade (along with the Highland Mounted Brigade). 2nd Dismounted Brigade was later renamed as 229th Brigade in the 74th (Yeomanry) Division.

== Commanders ==
The 2nd South Western Mounted Brigade was commanded from 1 April 1912 by Colonel R. Hoare. He was promoted to brigadier general on 5 August 1914 and remained in command until the brigade was absorbed into 2nd Dismounted Brigade. He took command of 2nd Dismounted Brigade on formation, and remained in command when the brigade was converted to 229th Brigade.

== See also ==
- 2/2nd South Western Mounted Brigade for the 2nd Line formation
- British yeomanry during the First World War

== Bibliography ==
- Becke, Major A.F. (1936). Order of Battle of Divisions Part 2A. The Territorial Force Mounted Divisions and the 1st-Line Territorial Force Divisions (42-56). London: His Majesty's Stationery Office.
- Becke, Major A.F. (1937). Order of Battle of Divisions Part 2B. The 2nd-Line Territorial Force Divisions (57th-69th) with The Home-Service Divisions (71st-73rd) and 74th and 75th Divisions. London: His Majesty's Stationery Office.
- Becke, Major A.F. (1938). Order of Battle of Divisions Part 3A. New Army Divisions (9-26). London: His Majesty's Stationery Office.
- James, Brigadier E.A. (1978). British Regiments 1914–18. London: Samson Books Limited. ISBN 0-906304-03-2.
- Mileham, Patrick (1994). The Yeomanry Regiments; 200 Years of Tradition. Edinburgh: Canongate Academic. ISBN 1-898410-36-4.
- Rinaldi, Richard A (2008). Order of Battle of the British Army 1914. Ravi Rikhye. ISBN 978-0-97760728-0.
- Westlake, Ray (1992). British Territorial Units 1914–18. Osprey Publishing. ISBN 978-1-85532-168-7.
- Westlake, Ray (1996). British Regiments at Gallipoli. Barnsley: Leo Cooper. ISBN 0-85052-511-X.
