= Highland Mounted Brigade =

- Active: 1908–February 1916
- Country: United Kingdom
- Branch: British Army
- Type: Yeomanry
- Size: Brigade
- HQ (peacetime): Inverness
- Engagements: World War I Gallipoli 1915 Egypt 1916

The Highland Mounted Brigade was a formation of the Territorial Force of the British Army, organised in 1908. After service in the Gallipoli Campaign and in the defence of Egypt, it was absorbed into the 2nd Dismounted Brigade in February 1916.

== Formation ==
Under the terms of the Territorial and Reserve Forces Act 1907 (7 Edw.7, c.9), the brigade was formed in 1908 as part of the Territorial Force. It consisted of three yeomanry regiments, a horse artillery battery and ammunition column, a transport and supply column and a field ambulance.

As the name suggests, the units were drawn from the Scottish Highlands.

== World War I ==
The brigade was embodied on 4 August 1914 and placed under First Army of Central Force. It moved to the Huntingdon area and then to Lincolnshire in November 1914. In April 1915, the brigade moved to Norfolk until August 1915 when it was dismounted.

=== Gallipoli ===
On 8 September 1915, the brigade boarded RMS Andania at Devonport and sailed for Alexandria, Egypt arriving on 18 September. On 26 September it landed at Gallipoli where it joined 2nd Mounted Division. The brigade remained at Suvla until evacuated on the night of 19/20 December 1915. It left 2nd Mounted Division on 22 December. It was transported to Alexandria via Imbros (20-24 December) and Mudros (24-26 December), arriving on 28 December and went to Sidi Bishr Camp.

=== Egypt ===
In late December 1915, the brigade returned to Egypt. It served on Suez Canal defences and as part of the Western Frontier Force.

In February 1916, Highland Mounted Brigade was absorbed into the 2nd Dismounted Brigade (along with the 2nd South Western Mounted Brigade). 2nd Dismounted Brigade was later renamed as 229th Brigade in the 74th (Yeomanry) Division.

== Commanders ==
The Highland Mounted Brigade had the following commanders:

From	Rank	Name
9 September 1914	Brigadier-General	Lord Lovat (sick 11 October 1915)
12 October 1915	Lieutenant-Colonel	A. Stirling (acting)
24 October 1915	Brigadier-General	A. Stirling

== See also ==
- 2/1st Highland Mounted Brigade for the 2nd Line formation
- British yeomanry during the First World War

== Bibliography ==
- Becke, Archibald F. (1936). Order of Battle of Divisions Part 2A. The Territorial Force Mounted Divisions and the 1st-Line Territorial Force Divisions (42–56). London: HMSO. OCLC 4405016.
- Becke, Archibald F. (1937). Order of Battle of Divisions Part 2B. The 2nd-Line Territorial Force Divisions (57th–69th) with The Home-Service Divisions (71st–73rd) and 74th and 75th Divisions. London: HMSO. OCLC 4405016.
- James, Brigadier E.A. (1978). British Regiments 1914–18. London: Samson Books Limited. ISBN 0-906304-03-2.
- Rinaldi, Richard A (2008). Order of Battle of the British Army 1914. Ravi Rikhye. ISBN 978-0-97760728-0.
- Westlake, Ray (1992). British Territorial Units 1914-18. Osprey Publishing. ISBN 978-1-85532-168-7.
- Westlake, Ray (1996). British Regiments at Gallipoli. Barnsley: Leo Cooper. ISBN 0-85052-511-X.
