= Gaza (Battle honour) =

British battle honour

Gaza was a battle honour awarded to units of the British and Imperial Armies that took part in one or more of the following engagements in the Great War:

- First Battle of Gaza, 26 Mar 1917
- Second Battle of Gaza, 19 Apr 1917
- Third Battle of Gaza, 31 Oct–7 Nov 1917
