= Suvla =

Bay on the coast of the Gallipoli peninsula in western Turkey

Coordinates: 40°18′11″N 26°13′48″E

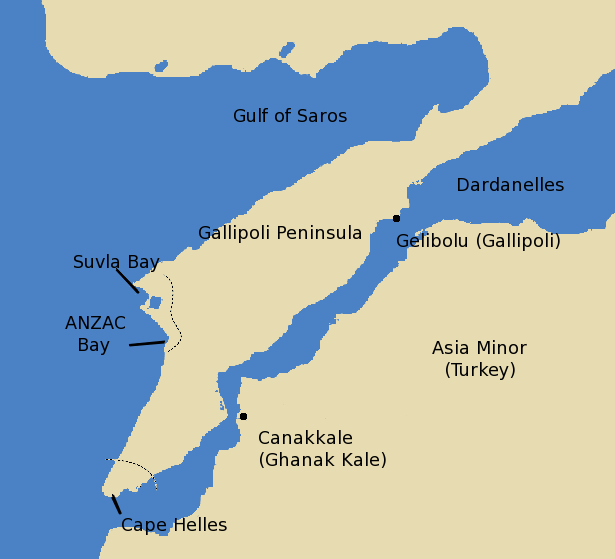

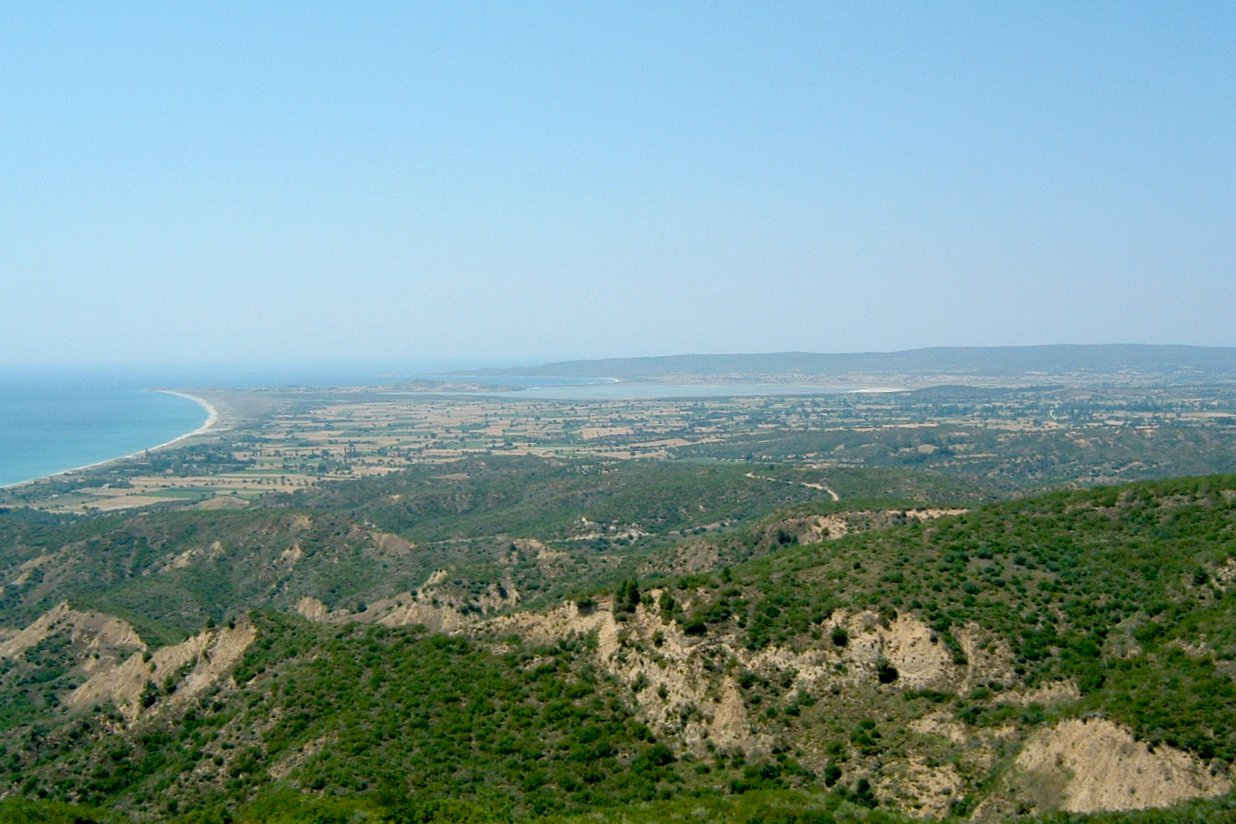
View of Suvla from Battleship Hill

Suvla (Greek: Σούβλα, "spit") is a bay on the Aegean coast of the Gallipoli peninsula in European Turkey, south of the Gulf of Saros.

On 6 August 1915, it was the site for the Landing at Suvla Bay by the British IX Corps as part of the August Offensive during the Battle of Gallipoli. The landing and others at various points along the peninsula were designed to capture the peninsula from Turkish troops defending it, and to open the Dardanelles Straits to Allied warships, thus facilitating a planned naval attack on Constantinople (Istanbul). The Gallipoli campaign ended in failure and high casualties for the Allied side, which included numbers of Australian, New Zealand, Indian, Irish, French, and Newfoundland troops.

The area is notable for viticulture and winemaking. The well-known wine producer "Suvla" is located here.

== Popular references ==
- Suvla is mentioned in the Irish Rebel song "The Foggy Dew", second verse: "It was better to die 'neath an Irish sky than at Suvla or Sedd el Bahr", and third verse: "But their lonely graves are by Suvla's waves or the fringe of the Great North Sea".
- Suvla Bay also features in "And the Band Played Waltzing Matilda", the oft-covered song by Eric Bogle.
- "Suvla Bay" was a popular Australian song (composer unidentified) in 1949, and was recorded by artists like Reg Lindsey, Ray Kernaghan, Frank Ifield and Slim Dusty.
- Suvla is also mentioned in the song "The Connaught Rangers": "At Suvla and at Sud el Bar, we fought your every bloody war..."
- Suvla is also mentioned in the traditional Newfoundland song "Recruiting Sergeant": "And on the sands of Suvla, they entered into hell"
- "The Bay of Suvla" is a song performed by Canadian folk-punk band The Dreadnoughts, released November 11, 2017, as a tribute to World War I.
