= 42nd (Hertfordshire) Company, Imperial Yeomanry =

- The Prince of Wales's feathers, badge of the Imperial Yeomanry
- Active: 1900–1901
- Country: United Kingdom
- Branch: Imperial Yeomanry
- Type: Yeomanry
- Role: Mounted infantry
- Size: 1 Company
- Part of: 12th Battalion, Imperial Yeomanry
- Garrison/HQ: Watford
- Patron: Earl of Clarendon
- Engagements: Second Boer War: Rhenoster River; Brandwater Basin; Krugersdorp
- Battle honours: South Africa 1900–01

42nd (Hertfordshire) Company was a unit of the Imperial Yeomanry formed to supplement the British Army in the Second Boer War. Raised by the part-time Hertfordshire Yeomanry and largely drawn from its ranks, the company was engaged at the Rhenoster River, in the Brandwater Basin, and in various small engagements round Krugersdorp. It was replaced by a new 42nd Company in 1901.

== Origin ==
Following a string of defeats during Black Week in early December 1899, the British government realised that it would need more troops than just the Regular Army to fight the Second Boer War. On 13 December, the decision to allow volunteer forces to serve in South Africa was made, and was publicly announced on 20 December. A Royal Warrant was issued on 24 December, officially creating the Imperial Yeomanry (IY). The force was organised as county service companies of approximately 115 men signed up for one year. Volunteers from the part-time Yeomanry and civilians quickly filled the new force, which was equipped to operate as Mounted infantry, armed with a Lee–Metford infantry rifle and bayonet instead of a cavalry carbine and sabre.

The government's appeal was sent to members of the Hertfordshire Yeomanry on Wednesday 20 December and by Friday morning 60–70 officers and men had volunteered, as well as numerous civilians, and more were coming in. The volunteers were medically examined and then sworn in by the regiments's Colonel, the Earl of Clarendon, who was also Lord Lieutenant of Hertfordshire. Among the civilian volunteers was Dr Arthur Martin-Leake from Hemel Hempstead District Hospital, who enlisted as a trooper. The Hertfordshire Company, IY, mobilised at the Rose and Crown Hotel in Watford on 11 January and the men arranged their billeting nearby. Captain J.B. Gilliat was appointed to command the company together with four other officers seconded from the Hertfordshire Yeomanry. The company was designated 42nd (Hertfordshire) Company and assigned to the 12th Battalion, IY, serving alongside the 41st (Hampshire) and the 43rd and 44th (Suffolk) Companies. Second Lieutenant G.C.S. Paget of 42nd Company provided a Maxim machine gun on a two-horse 'galloping carriage' for the battalion and his brother S.A. Paget, retired from the Staffordshire Yeomanry, was appointed to command 12th Battalion's 16-man machine gun section. The Hertfordshire Yeomanry also provided the battalion's second-in-command (Major the Earl of Essex) and veterinary officer.

== Service ==
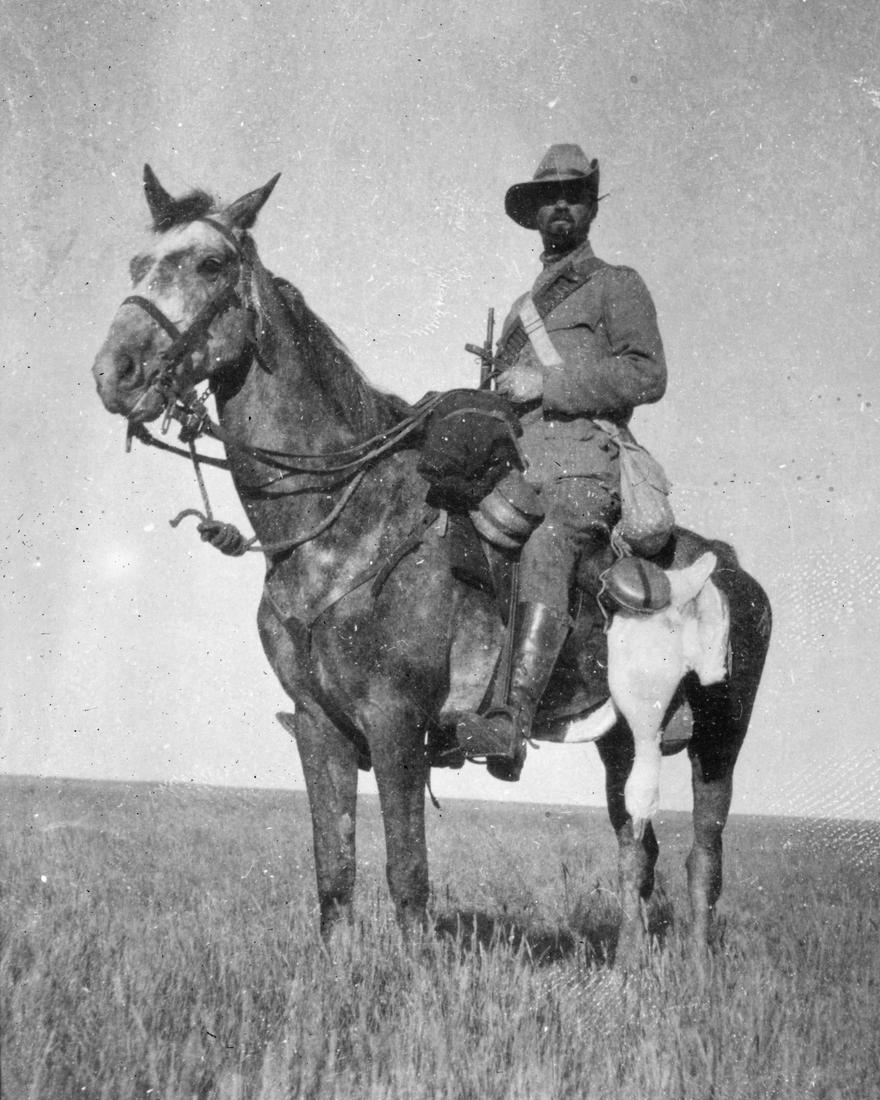
A typical Imperial Yeoman on campaign

After several postponements, the company entrained at Watford on 3 March and boarded the SS Cornwall at Tilbury Docks together with the machine gun section and four other companies, including 44th (Suffolk). Only 360 horses could be carried on the Cornwall (the remainder went out aboard another ship) but they could be exercised on deck during the slow voyage. The troops disembarked at Cape Town on 28 March and 42nd and 44th Companies were sent to Maitland Camp for four weeks' training.

12th Battalion was assigned to a yeomanry brigade under Brigadier-General the Earl of Errol in the Orange Free State (OFS). 42nd and 44th Companies began the 550 miles (890 km) march to Bloemfontein in mid-April, the first part being a 'show of force' through the area round Stellenbosch and Paarl in the Western Cape. By the time 42nd and 44th Companies with the battalion staff reached Bloemfontein the advance into Transvaal had already begun, and the 41st and 43rd Companies had moved on. What remained of the battalion was now supposed to join a yeomanry brigade under Col Viscount Downe, but in the event was reassigned as 'Corps Troops' under Lord Roberts's main army. After a few days at Bloemfontein it was sent up to join that force north of the River Vaal.

=== Rhenoster River ===
The battalion's march was uneventful but, because there were scattered parties of Boers still active in the area, it had to deploy advance and flank guards at all times. It crossed the Vaal on 1 June and was about 15 miles (24 km) from Johannesburg when news arrived that the Boers under Christiaan de Wet had overrun several garrisons along the railway and destroyed the Rhenoster bridge. Roberts sent his chief of staff, Major-General Lord Kitchener back to organise the defence of the line of communications. Kitchener moved south with a column including 42nd and 44th Companies IY and brought the Boers to action near the Rhenoster river. 42nd Company was involved in two-hour fight to clear De Wet from his position, then early next morning the company was roused from its camp to ride 2 miles (3.2 km) to where the Boers were attacking an engineers' train. Later that morning they drove the Boers off some hills, but had to return to the camp which had been attacked. The following day (11 June) the two companies together with some infantry and artillery were ordered to escort a convoy of provisions to Maj-Gen Hector MacDonald's column at Heilbron. All went well on the first day of the march, but early on the second the convoy came under Boer shellfire and had to retire until the escort had cleared the Boers and the march could continue. (Note: Amery (footnote, p. 272) confuses 42nd Company with 43rd Company.)

=== Brandwater Basin ===
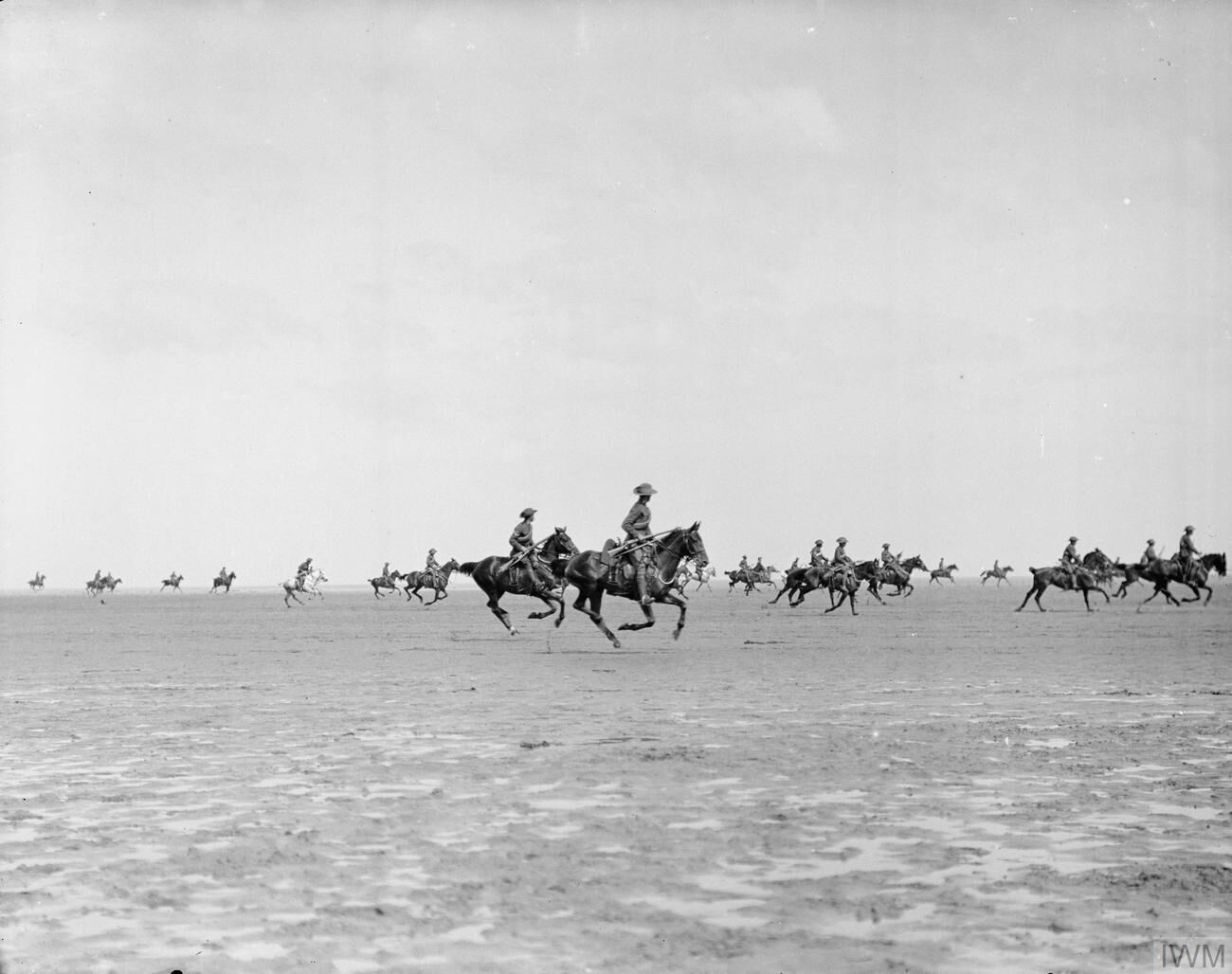
Imperial Yeomanry galloping over a plain during the Second Boer War.

By now 42nd Company had suffered a number of wounded and prisoners, and had had about 30 men evacuated sick (including Capt Gilliat), consequently it had been reduced to a fighting strength of about 70, commanded by Lt G.R. Smith-Bosanquet. The company joined Lieutenant-General Lord Methuen's column, which was cooperating with Kitchener's, and together they drove De Wet south-west towards the Brandwater Basin. A large force was now assembled under Lt-Gen Sir Archibald Hunter at Frankfort. This was joined on 29 June by MacDonald's column from Heilbron, including 42nd and 44th Companies IY and mounted troops from various units as well as the infantry of his Highland Brigade. 42nd Company joined Brig-Gen C.P. Ridley's 2nd Mounted Infantry Brigade. Hunter now took over all operations in NE Free State. Pushing De Wet into the Brandwater Basin he reached Reitz on 7 July and Bethlehem on 11 July. Here he established a base and disposed his forces in a cordon round the basin.

Hunter's drive through the Wittenbergen range into the Brandwater Basin began on 15 July, but that night De Wet broke through the cordon with some 2600 Boers, including President Steyn and the government of the OFS. The 4000 remaining Boers trapped in the basin surrendered on 30 July, but in the meantime Hunter sent his mounted troops, including Ridley's brigade, in pursuit of De Wet. This began the 'Great de Wet Hunt' as the Boer force zigzagged across northern OFS and southern Transvaal for the next two months. Ridley's brigade followed all the way. At the end of July Capt Gilliat disobeyed orders and rejoined 42nd Company. Trapped against the Vaal, De Wet broke through the British cordon once more. Kitchener then redeployed the columns to trap him against the Magaliesberg mountains, but again, De Wet broke through at Olifant's Nek. Ridley's brigade was then part of a force sent to relieve a British detachment that was surrounded at the Elands River. In mid-August 42nd Company marched via Rustenburg to Pretoria, where it halted to rest and refit. The company was depleted in numbers through sickness, and several officers had been posted to other duties, including Lt Sir George Arthur, who had been sent to the remount depot, and was able to supply the 42nd with good replacement horses.

=== Operations from Krugersdorp ===
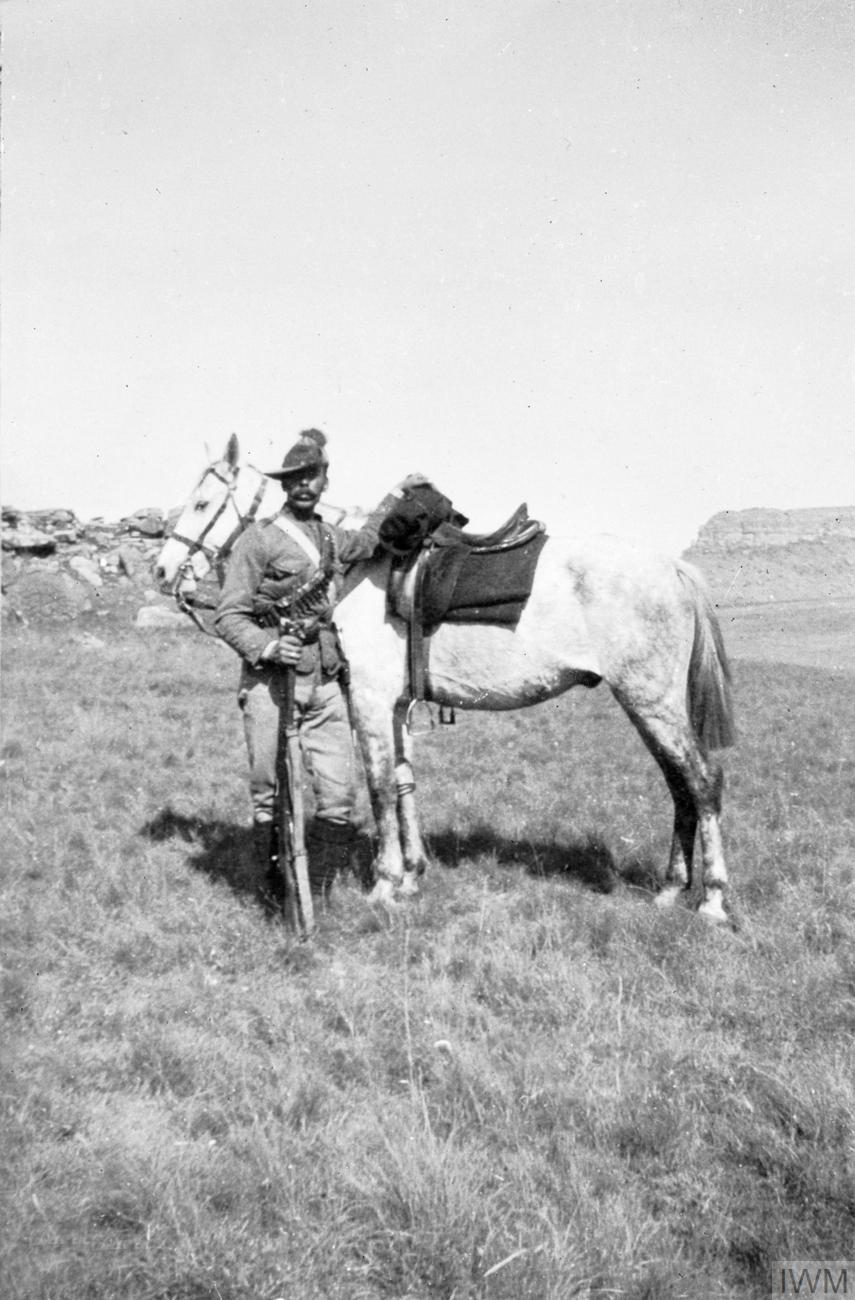
A yeoman standing by his horse in South Africa

At the end of August 42nd Company was sent by rail to join Maj-Gen Fitzroy Hart's column at Krugersdorp. This force was based on 5th Irish Brigade together with artillery and IY (38th (High Wycombe), 42nd and 44th Companies). Leaving Krugersdorp on 30 August, Hart marched through northwestwards across the Mooi River, then on 9 September made a dash southwestwards for Potchefstroom with his mounted troops and some Irish infantry carried in mule wagons. The plan was to surround the town and make a surprise attack after dark. 42nd Company had furthest to go, a 30 miles (48 km) ride to get behind the town, but although the move was successful most of the fighting Boers had already left and joined De Wet. After a few days at Potchefstroom, Hart was ordered back to Krugersdorp, arriving on 30 September after a round trip of 300 miles (480 km).

At Krugersdorp the staff of 12th Battalion were dispersed – never having a full battalion to command – and Capt Gilliat became Officer Commanding Mounted Troops for Hart's Column. The column spent the next three months marching backwards and forwards, often at night, in an attempt to dominate its assigned area of 6–700 square miles. 42nd Company usually acted as flank guard or close escort to the artillery or the administrative 'tail'. Early in December Hart sent the 42nd and 44th Companies, with a detachment of the South Wales Borderers, to hold Orange Grove, but they were recalled to Krugersdorp in anticipation of an attack by Koos de la Rey on 16 December. The garrison dug perimeter defences and 'stood to', but the attack never materialised. The two yeomanry companies then rested at Krugersdorp and received a new issue of kit to replace their ragged clothes.

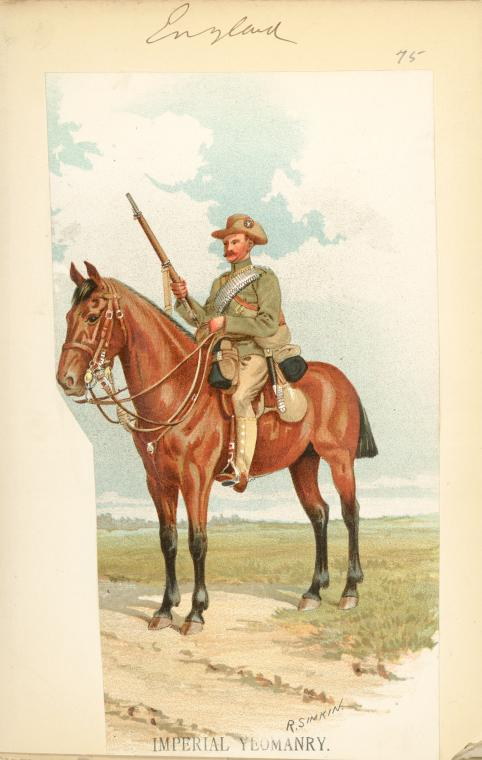
Richard Simkin's painting of an Imperial Yeoman.

At the end of January six men of 42nd Company forming part of a convoy escort were involved in an action at Modderfontein. The convoy was attacked at a pass in the Gatrand mountains on 25 January, but the yeomanry rearguard was able to hold off the attackers while the South Wales Borderers manned the pass and saw the convoy safely to Modderfontein. Next day the town was surrounded by Boers under Jan Smuts and subjected to intense fire. Lieutenant George Dymoke Green of 59th (Oxfordshire) Company, IY, (formerly a trooper in 42nd Company) volunteered to take party to hold a dominating kopje. The party, including the Hertfordshire men, held out for two days. Lieutenant Green was killed, but all six men of 42nd Company survived to be taken prisoner: they were released after 12 hours.

In early February Capt Gilliat was returning to Krugersdorp by train from leave in Durban. Outside Graylingstadt, near Heidelberg, the train was stopped by a mine and attacked by a party of Boers. Many of the officers aboard having left the train earlier, Gilliat was the only officer present, and he had only seven armed men from assorted units. They kept up a spirited defence while their ammunition lasted, losing two killed and two wounded, together with two civilian passengers killed. Gilliat was negotiating a safe conduct for the civilians and the Boers were looting the train when they were driven off by shellfire as a relieving force arrived. Gilliat resumed his position as OC Mounted Troops at Krudersdorp, and over the next two months he and his men patrolled the local area. At one point Hart's column carried out a setpiece attack on the Lossberg. Gilliat and his four squadrons galloped round the left flank of the objective, without coming under fire, only to discover that the Boers had already left on the approach of another British column of which Hart had been unaware.

== Second Contingent ==
Reinforcements for the First Contingent of the IY were raised under Army Order 40 of 1901. The Hertfordshire Yeomanry recruited a draft of 29 men for 42nd Company, but on arrival in South Africa it was broken up and the men were used to reinforce other companies. The First Contingent of the IY was due to complete their year's term of service early in 1901, but the Second Contingent was not yet ready. The senior IY officer in South Africa, Lord Chesham, visited Krugersdorp in March and gave a speech to the yeomanry asking them to 'stick it' until they were relieved. Noting that Gilliat was not fully fit Chesham took him on his staff and Lt Geoffrey Lubbock was promoted to captain to command 42nd Company on 19 March.

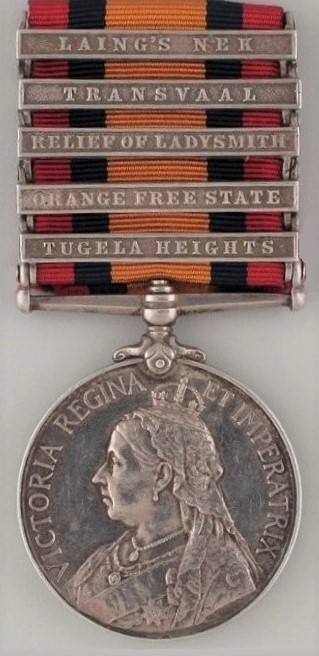

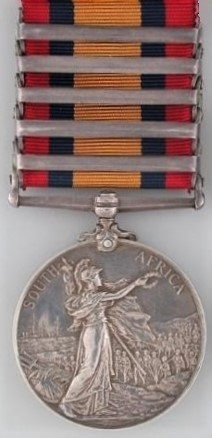
Queen's South Africa Medal, obverse and reverse.

At the end of April the remaining yeomanry in Hart's force were ordered to Kroonstad, where they helped train the newly arrived Second Contingent men in scouting. Finally, they went to Cape Town and on 8 May embarked aboard the SS Mongolian. Captain Lubbock and 24 men of 42nd Company and the MG Section sailed home aboard the Mongolian, the others having been invalided home earlier (mainly due to sickness) or having transferred to other units fighting in South Africa – 10 men had joined the South African Constabulary in October 1900. The company's service earned the Hertfordshire Yeomanry its first Battle honour: South Africa 1900–01. The men received the Queen's South Africa Medal with the clasps for 'Cape Colony', 'Orange Free State' and 'Transvaal'; those who were present at the Brandwater Basin received the 'Wittebergen' clasp instead of that for Orange Free State, and those who served on into 1901 also received that for 'South Africa 1901'. Captain J.B. Gilliat, Lt G.C.S. Paget and Sergeant-Major W.J. Coles were Mentioned in dispatches and later Capt Gilliat was awarded the Distinguished Service Order and Sgt-Maj Coles the Distinguished Conduct Medal.

A new 42nd Company, IY, was formed with different personnel drawn from the Second Contingent and was in action at Armstrong's Drift in December 1901.

A number of veterans of the original 42nd (Hertfordshire) Company re-enlisted for a second tour of duty in South Africa, some of them in the 115th–118th Companies of the 25th (Sharpshooters) Battalion, a picked unit recruited mainly in London and its environs. Trooper Martin-Leake became a medical officer in the South African Constabulary and won the Victoria Cross (VC) for rescuing wounded under fire in February 1902. He won a Bar to his VC – one of only three ever awarded – for his conduct at the First Battle of Ypres in 1914.

== Uniform ==
42nd (Hertfordshire) Company, IY, wore a khaki uniform with either a military pattern tunic or a Norfolk jacket. According to regulations the company badge – the letters 'IY' surmounted by the number – was worn on the shoulder strap, but the 42nd seem to have worn 'IY' (without number) on the collar instead. The hat badge, worn on the upturned left side of their Slouch hats, was the Prince of Wales's feathers (generally accepted as the IY's badge) above the numeral 'XII' (for 12th Battalion) on a Cockade of the Prince of Wales's colours of red and purple; officers wore the cockade alone. Most men of 42nd Company obtained at their own expense the yeomanry Field service cap in red and purple.

== Memorial ==
The Hertfordshire Yeomanry erected a stone tablet in the War Memorial Chapel of St Albans Cathedral to the nine members of 42nd (Hertfordshire) Company, IY, who died on service during the Second Boer War.

== See also ==
- List of Imperial Yeomanry units of the Second Boer War
