= Royal Military College of Canada Museum =

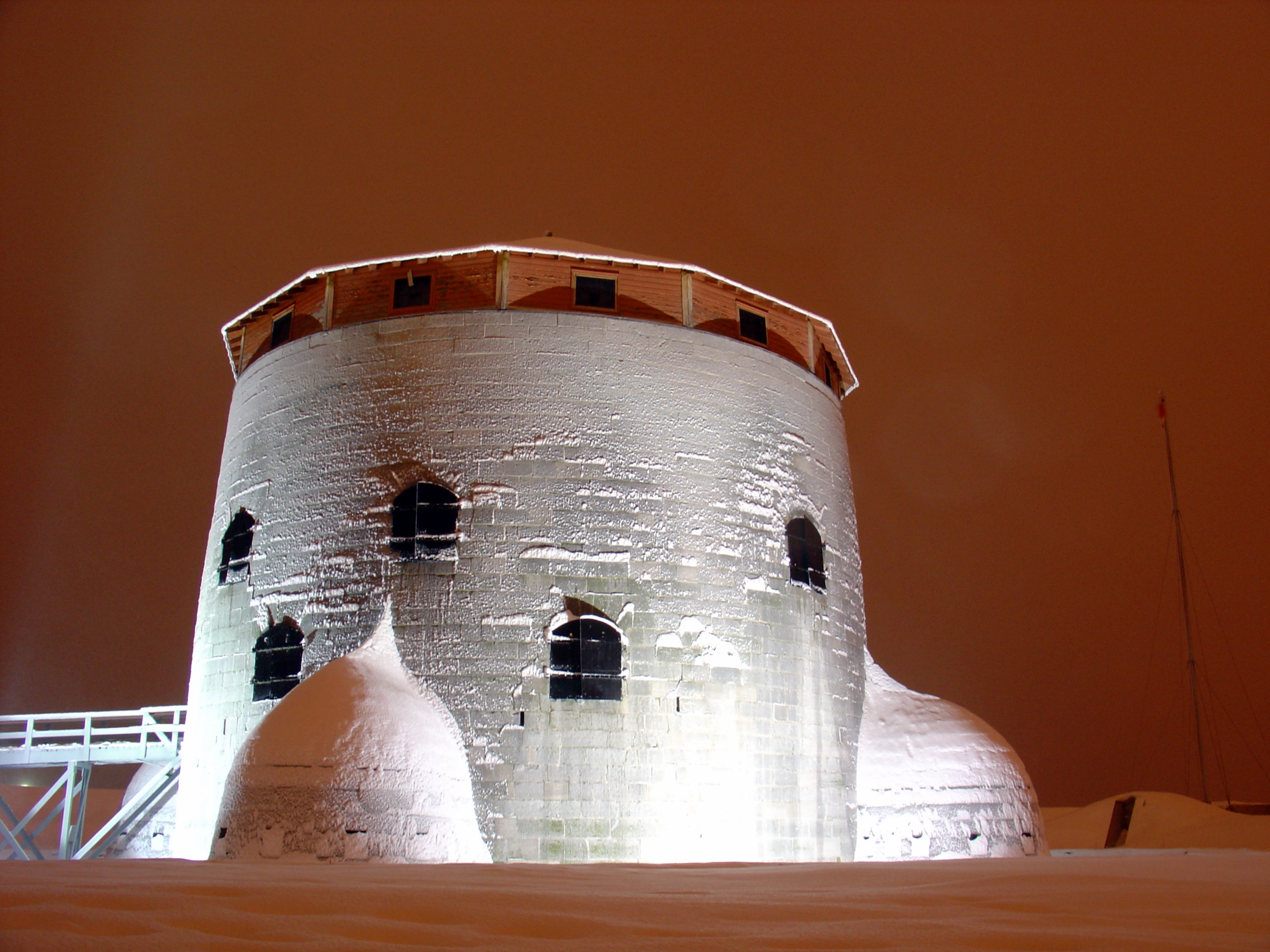
- Established: 1962
- Location: Fort Frederick 4 Passchendale Dr. on the campus of the Royal Military College of Canada Kingston, Ontario Ontario East
- Coordinates: 44.2277°N 76.4696°W
- Type: military history
- Curator: Ross McKenzie

The Royal Military College of Canada Museum, established in 1962, is located in a Martello tower known as Fort Frederick on the campus of the Royal Military College of Canada (RRMC or RMC) in Kingston, Ontario, and is operated by the college. Until 2016 the museum had regular hours from the last weekend in June until Labour Day. Although admission was free, donations were accepted. Guided tours were offered in English and French. Genealogical research and archival records services were offered relating to college history or with inquires relating to ex-cadets when permitted by privacy regulations.

In 2016, restoration work began on Fort Frederick and the Museum moved out of the Tower, leaving the Museum without a designated public exhibition space.

The museum and historic site can also be visited via the Virtual Museum. The Martello tower housing the museum is a 1790 fortification consisting mostly of earthworks with a north wall of stone masonry. It is on the Registry of Historic Places of Canada. Fort Frederick is one of four Martello Towers, built by Corps of Royal Engineers between 1846 and 1848 to augment the Kingston defences. The Martello tower was named in honour of Frederick, Prince of Wales.

== Purpose ==
The museum's purpose is to collect, conserve, research and display artifacts and records relating to the history of the RMCC, achievements of its graduates and the earlier naval history of its site, including the Kingston Royal Naval Dockyard which once occupied Point Frederick.

== Collections ==
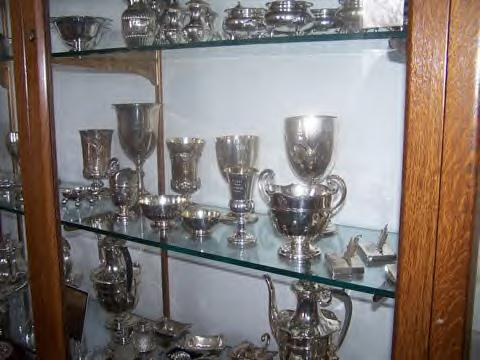
Leinster Plate, a collection of silverware, of the Prince of Wales's Leinster Regiment

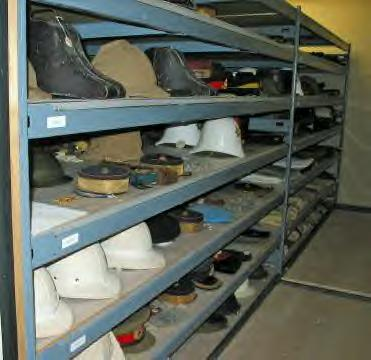
Museum, Storage Facility, Fort Haldimand, Royal Military College of Canada

The museum also holds a small collection of material related to the Point Frederick dockyard and the Royal Navy.

The Royal Military College and other military units started to collect artifacts in a piecemeal way after the Great War. The college’s commandants indicated in 1918 that he wanted to establish a museum at RMC. Individual requests were made to the War Trophy Commission 1918–19 and artifacts were received over a period of time 1920-26. Major-General Sir Archibald Macdonell, who wished to establish a museum in 1919, wrote a letter to the Secretary of the Militia Council requesting, “that some of the various War Trophies captired [sic] by the Canadian Corps may be dispatched to the Royal Military College, for disposal about the grounds and buildings. Oweing [sic] to the record of the ex-cadets, it would be only fitting and right that the College be allowed certain trophies.” He noted that some trophies had been turned in from the field to the War Trophies Commission addressed to RMC, but had not yet been received. Major Gustave Lanctôt of the Dominion Archives replied in 1920 that the War Trophies Commission was waiting for governmental policy with respect to the distribution of War Trophies; [the College] “may be assured to receive the best treatment possible in view of the fine record of its students and the importance of its standing as a National Military College.”

In September 1922, an army board met at RMC to look at the possibility of creating a museum in Fort Frederick. In January 1926, the Quartermaster General wrote the RMC commandant: “It is the desire of National Defence Headquarters to make the museum at the Royal Military College the principal storehouse for military relics of all natures...” In February 1926, a 12 page inventory of RMC’s holdings included hundreds of small arms, bayonets, scabbards, swords, lances, pistols, machine guns, grenades and bombs, clothing, trench stores, artillery ammunition, engineering models, and other miscellaneous articles. Many of these holdings were of the 1914-1918 vintage, and, many had been captured from the Germans, particularly during 1918.

Between 1922 and 1946, the RMC collections consisted merely of arms and military artifacts collections raised, built and maintained by individuals or very small groups of veterans. Although these items were interesting, there was no overall, coordinated story.

Lady Lee widow of Arthur Lee, 1st Viscount Lee of Fareham presented to the Royal Military College of Canada Museum in 1947 a silver-headed walking stick of her late-husband: which he used daily at RMC fifty-four years earlier. The stick has two silver bands listing the places where Lee served -or visited from 1888 to 1904, which, includes Royal Military College of Canada. Lady Lee also presented the RMC Museum three photographs of Lord Lee - two of them taken in Kingston, one in uniform in 1893, and the other in 1896 wearing a checked suit, silver-topped stick in hand. The third is a photograph of the portrait by James Gunn in full regalia of a Knight Grand Cross of the Most Honourable Order of the Bath.

The museum displays collections of military memorabilia and 7000 items, including a collection of 16th through 20th century arms, uniforms, flags, military art and trophies. It holds, for example, the Douglas Arms Collection which was presented to RMC by Walter Douglas (RMC 1890). The Douglas Arms Collection contains over 400 guns that were originally in the ownership of Mexican President, General Porfirio Diaz. Another significant collection is the Leinster Plate, a collection of silverware, of the Prince of Wales's Leinster Regiment. The Nanton Arms collection was presented to RMC by No 78 Colborne J. Nanton (RMC 1882). The Nanton Arms Collection contains Indian daggers and various other arms that were originally presented by the Maharajah of Cooch Behar to Nanton during his service in India prior to the First World War. A model of the 112-gun HMS St Lawrence (1814) was donated in 2008. The lower floor of the Martello tower contains exhibits on the War of 1812 and the fort’s dockyard. The main floor contains exhibits on the history of the college, and personal mementos of the Old Eighteen, the first class that enrolled in 1876. A gun platform displays the original cannons at the top of the tower. The archives includes cartographic materials, prints and drawings, manuscripts and photographs. The human history consists of manuscripts, medals, military history and technology and weapons.

The museum is also responsible for a collection of Canadian landscape and military art, including paintings, sculpture, and stained glass windows on display throughout the college, though primarily in Currie Hall and Yeo Hall. The college announced in 2011 the establishment of an art venue in the New Learning Center.

=== Art collection ===
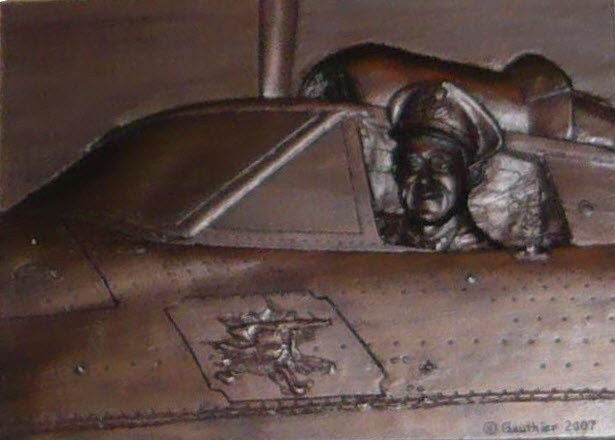
Bas-relief of Air Commodore Leonard Birchall by André Gauthier

In 2010, Royal Military College of Canada Museum became responsible for the college’s art collection. The college's art collection consists of just over 1,000 two-dimensional works of art, such as paintings, limited edition prints, drawing]s and other works on paper. The three-dimensional works in the collection include sculptures and stained glass. Approximately 20% of the catalogued art collection at RMCC is on display at the college and the remaining 80% is in storage in Fort Haldimand.

There are works in the art collection by: Admiral Henry Wolsey Bayfield (1795–1885), Christopher Clark, Charles Comfort, Forshaw Day, Jean Redpath Drummond (c. 1845 – c. 1920), Washington F. Friend (c. 1820 – 1886), Thomas Hilton Garside, Lawren Philip Harris, Edward John Hughes, Robert Stewart Hyndman, C.W. Jefferys, Manly MacDonald, Orlando Norie, Thomas Rowlandson, Richard Simkin, William Thurston Topham (1888–1966) and Emeric Essex Vidal (1791–1861).

The works may have been presented to the college by ex-cadets or by graduating classes on the occasion of reunions, as memorials, as commissions or purchases. The Gauthier Collection, gifted by the Class of 1974, consists of 60 military sculptures and bas reliefs by Col (Ret’d) André Gauthier, OMM, CD., including one of a Royal Military College of Canada Cadet. A watercolour of ex-cadet #444 Major-General William Bethune Lindsay, CB, CMG, DSO by Canadian artist Richard George Mathews (1870–1955), for example, was donated by ex-cadet, #10263 Don Lovell, in 1981. A landscape painting of a lumber camp in early spring by Manly Edward MacDonald (1889–1971), for example was presented by Dr. Clarence C Cook (#H6890) in 1968 on the occasion of the Class of 1918's 50th anniversary. A posthumous 3/4 length portrait of No. 1557 Colonel William Reginald Sawyer, Director of Studies 1948–1967 standing in front of the Mackenzie Building and the Stone Frigate in his academic robes was commissioned by Charles Fraser Comfort (1900–1994). Mr. John Spurr, the former RMC librarian, acquired items addressing military and political events in late 18th and early 19th century North America, limited edition maps and prints of key battles, caricatures by Thomas Rowlandson, political cartoons, and illustrations of uniforms. Mr. John Spurr acquired watercolour paintings depicting Siege of Ciudad Rodrigo (1812) Jan. 19th 1812, by Richard Simkin (1840–1926); the Battle of Fuentes de Oñoro 5 May 1811, by Orlando Norie (1832–1901); and the ruins of Ypres Cathedral with Canadian troops in the foreground, Nov. 1917 by Christopher Clark (1875–1942). Two panoramic watercolours c 1815 depict Point Frederick and Kingston Harbour and Sackett’s Harbour in New York by Emeric Essex Vidal.

== Memberships and affiliations ==
The museum is a member of the Canadian Museums Association and the Organization of Military Museums of Canada Inc. It is also accredited within the Canadian Forces Museum System. It is affiliated with the Canadian Heritage Information Network, and the Virtual Museum of Canada. A cooperating association of friends of the museum has been formed to assist with projects. The Parks Canada Agency often participates in joint programs, or provides supporting resources to the Royal Military College of Canada Museum, which is a partner organization.

Year	Significance
1918	Brigadier Charles N. Perreau, RMC Commandant 1915–19, indicated that he wanted to establish a museum at RMC. RMC started to collect artifacts in a piecemeal way.; In 1918, Col. Charles N. Perreau requested a propeller on behalf of the RMC to the Commission on War Records and Trophies. “as a memoria of the many cadets we have sent to the RAF.”
1920	151 Major-General Sir Archibald Macdonell, RMC commandant 1919–25 gathered trophies he had addressed to RMC from the battlefields, and a few items from different sources.; Maj.-Gen. Macdonell requested various War Trophies captured by the Canadian Corps be dispatched to RMC for disposal about the grounds and buildings in recognition of the record of the ex-cadets.
September 1922	A special army board met at RMC to look at the possibility of creating a museum in Fort Frederick, on RMC grounds. The conclusion was positive.
January 1926	Quartermaster General wrote to 621 Brigadier Charles Francis Constantine, DSO, RMC Commandant 1925–30 “It is the desire of National Defence Headquarters to make the museum at the Royal Military College the principal storehouse for military relics of all natures...”; Although the army opened many museums from 1946 to 1964, the RMC Museum did not materialize.
February 1926	An inventory of RMC’s holdings, 12 pages of items, many of the 1914–1918 vintage, had been captured from the Germans.
1938	Walter Douglas (RMC 1890) donated the 430-piece collection of arms of the late General Porfirio Díaz, former President of Mexico to RMC.; Most of these firearms, had little to do with RMC’s history.
1946	The packing cases left by Douglas had not yet been opened.
July 1946	RMC authorities decided to close the RMC museum.; Many artifacts contained in Fort Henry, a 19th-century citadel overlooking the RMC grounds were given to other military museums.
1957	The army published the Military Museums order which presented the parameters within which corps or unit army museums could be created, and described when and how these museums could access equipment or war trophies.; Many army museums started to be officially recognized.
1960	The idea of reopening the RMC museum resurfaced.; Douglas’s cases were finally opened, along with others containing the material that had been set aside in 1946.
25 June 1962	The new RMC Museum opened at its present location in the Martello tower at Fort Frederick.
2007	The pool in the Fort Haldimand dormitory, which was closed in the mid-1990s, was filled in and covered with a concrete slab. The pool area was divided up into two stories and is now used for the Museum storeroom and other storage.; |-
2010	Royal Military College of Canada Museum became responsible for the College’s art collection

== War trophies ==
The Royal Military College of Canada Museum curator oversees the trophies and memorials on the college grounds.

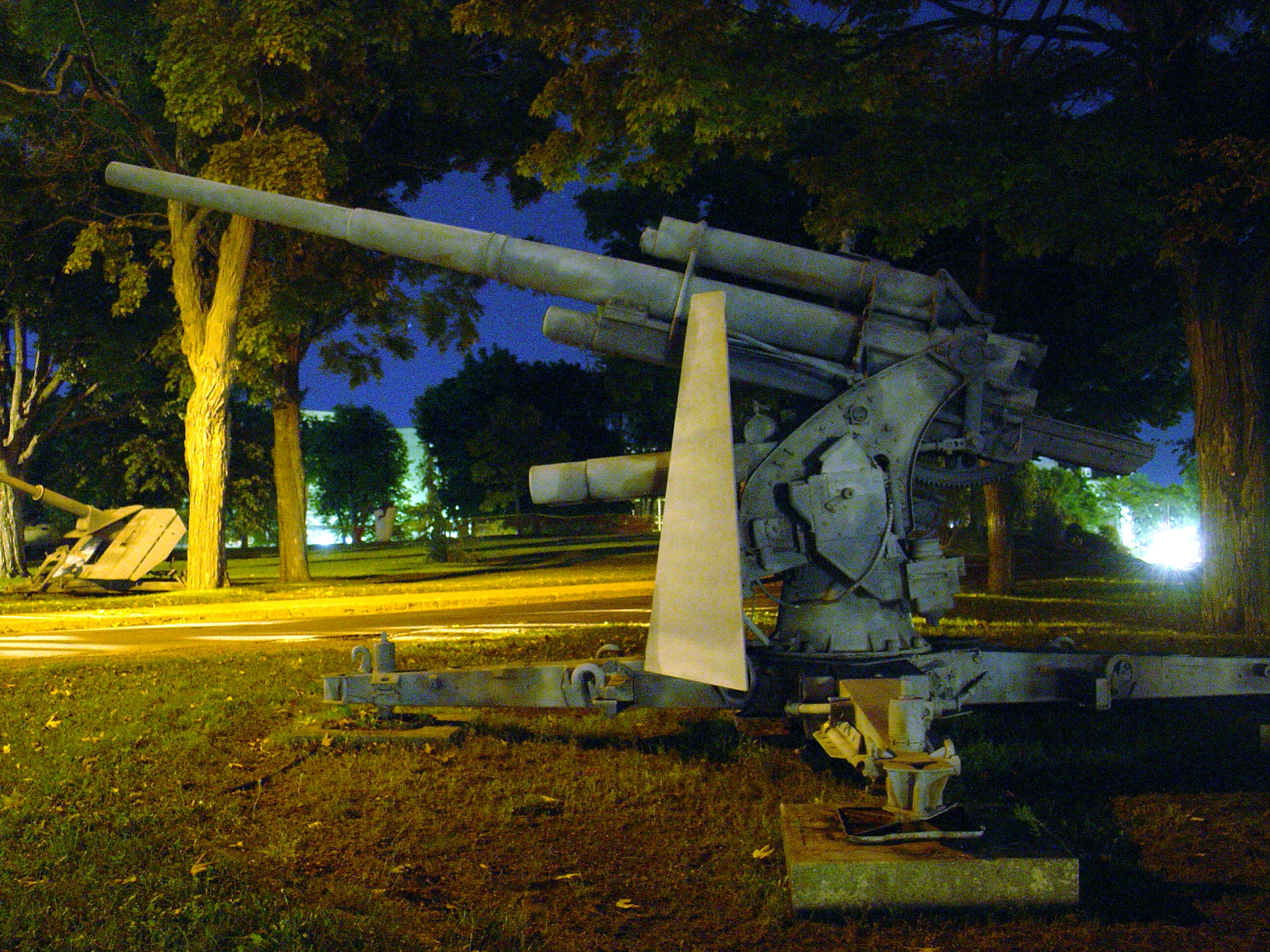
88mm gun monument at the Royal Military College of Canada.

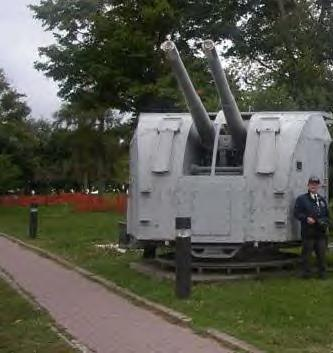
HMCS Huron (G24) X Guns, Royal Military College of Canada

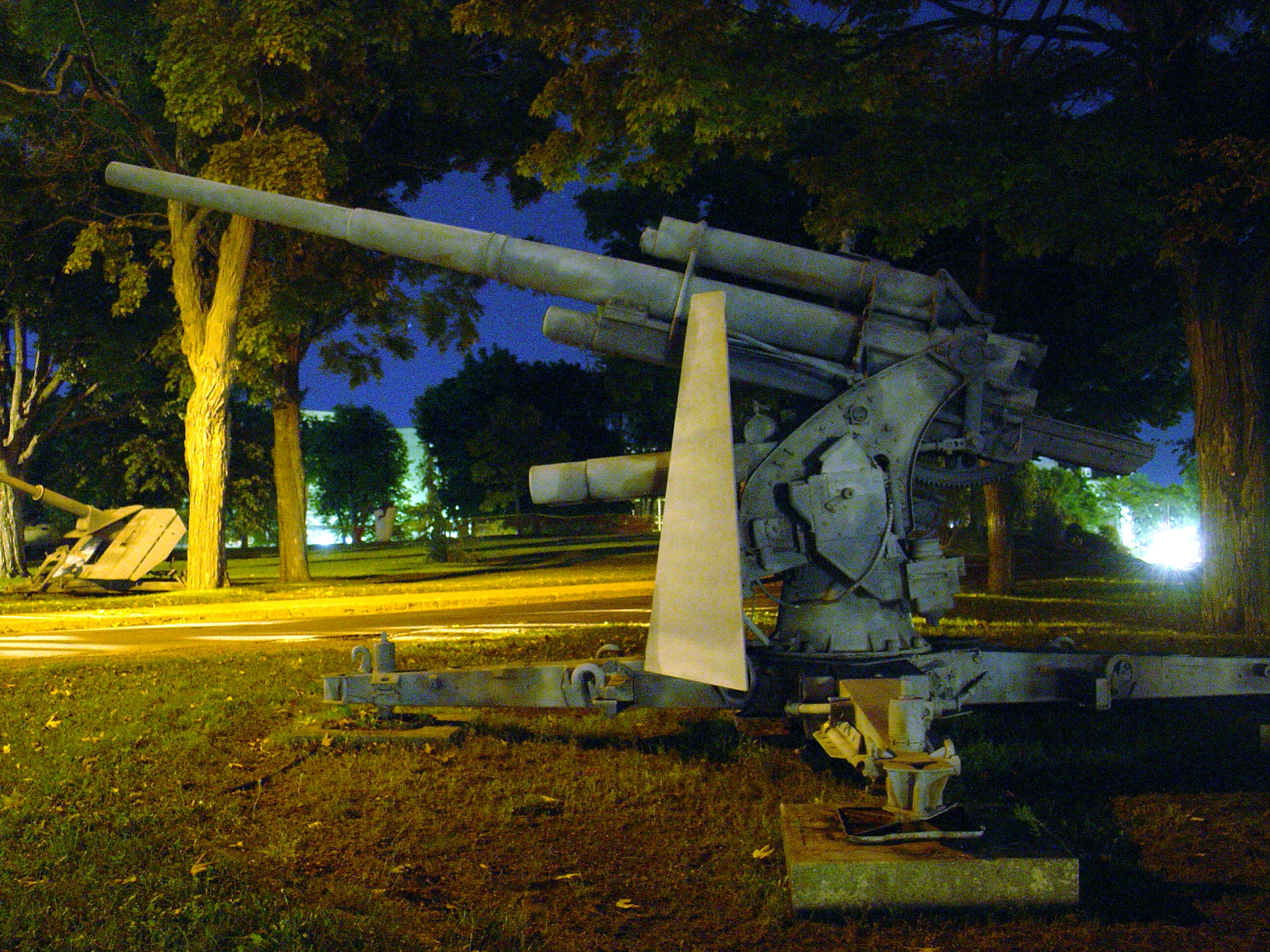
88mm gun monument at the Royal Military College of Canada.

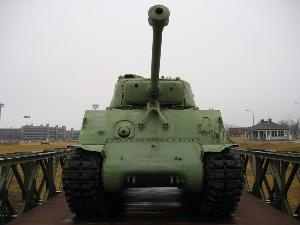
Bailey bridge at Royal Military College of Canada constructed in 2004 to commemorate the 100th Anniversary of the Engineering Branch

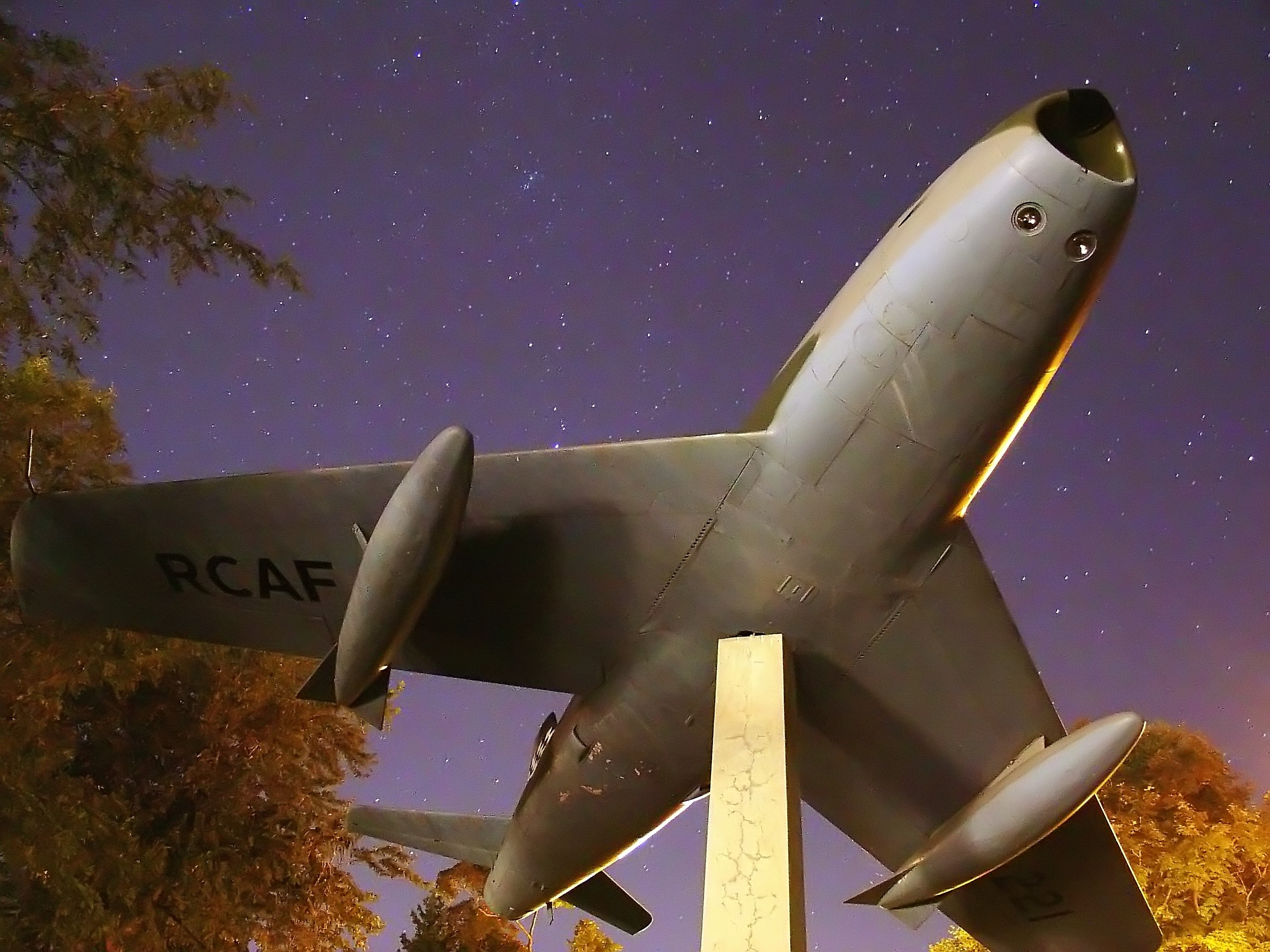
F-86 Sabre monument at the Royal Military College of Canada.

Artillery or Ordnance	Description	Location
Blomefield SBML 32-pounder Gun,	weight 57-0-2, (6,386 lbs), Carron, 1806, King George III cypher,	Fort Frederick Tower 3 North.
Blomefield SBML 32-pounder Gun,	weight 56-3-0, (6,084 lbs), Carron, 1807, King George III cypher,	Fort Frederick Tower 3 East.
Blomefield SBML 32-pounder Gun,	weight 56-0-25, (6,025 lbs), Carron, 1811, King George III cypher,	Fort Frederick Tower 3 West.
Blomefield SBML 32-pounder Gun,	Walker Co, King George III cypher,	Parade Square North East.
Millar SBML 32-pounder Gun,	weight 64-2-10 (7,234 lbs), Walker Co, 1842, King George III cypher,	Fort Frederick 2.
Blomefield SBML 32-pounder Gun,	weight 67-0-9 (7,513 lbs), Carron, 1807, King George III cypher,	Fort Frederick 3.
Blomefield SBML 32-pounder Gun,	weight 53-0-25 (5,961 lbs), Walker Co, King George III cypher,	Fort Frederick 5.
Blomefield SBML 32-pounder Gun,	weight 64-3-0 (7,252 lbs), Walker Co, 1842,	Fort Frederick 6.
Blomefield Palliser conversion of a SBML to RML 32-pounder Gun,	RGF, 1870, Queen Victoria cypher,	Paint Yard.
Blomefield Palliser conversion of a SBML to RML 32-pounder Gun,	Queen Victoria cypher,	Paint Yard.
Blomefield SBML 32-pounder Gun,	Walker Co, King George III cypher,	Crerar Gateway West.
Blomefield SBML 32-pounder Gun,	weight 50-1-14 (5,670 lbs), Walker Co, King George III cypher,	Crerar Gateway East.
Blomefield SBML 32-pounder Gun,	Carron, 1807, King George III cypher,	Fort Haldiman.
Blomefield SBML 32-pounder Gun,	King George III cypher,	MacDonald West.
Blomefield SBML 32-pounder Gun,	Walker Co, King George III cypher,	MacDonald East.
SBML 24-pounder Gun,	weight 20-0-4 (2,244 lbs, weight of a 6-pounder), 1847, Queen Victoria cypher,	Fort Frederick North East 1, mounted on long wooden carriage.
SBML 24-pounder Gun,	weight 20-0-0 (2,240 lbs, weight of a 6-pounder), 1847, Queen Victoria cypher,	Fort Frederick 7, mounted on long wooden carriage.
SBML 24-pounder Brass Gun,	weight 12-3-7 (1,435 lbs), 1843, CLXXV (175), Queen Victoria cypher, DEMD,	Senior Staff Mess North.
SBML 9-pounder Brass Gun,	weight 13-2-0 (1,512 lbs), FM Eardly-Wilmot, 1859, Queen Victoria cypher, 4862,	Senior Staff Mess South.
SBML 9-pounder Brass Gun,	1813, Dolphin handles, DLVIII (558), King George III cypher,	flagpole East.
SBML 9-pounder Brass Gun,	1812, Dolphin handles, CCCLIV (354), King George III cypher,	flagpole West.
SBML 32-pounder Gun,	Carron, weight 17-3-7 (1,995 lbs),	Fort Frederick Tower 2 North West.
SBML 32-pounder Gun,	Carron, 1808,	Fort Frederick Tower 2 North.
SBML 32-pounder Gun,	Carron, 1804,	Fort Frederick Tower 2 North East.
SBML 32-pounder Gun,	Carron, weight 17-3-7 (1,995 lbs),	Fort Frederick Tower, Main South.
SBML 32-pounder Gun,	Carron, weight 17-3-11 (1,999 lbs),	Fort Frederick Tower, Main North.
SBML 32-pounder Gun,	Carron, weight 17-1-21 (1,953 lbs),	Fort Frederick Tower, Main North East.
SBML 10-inch 52-cwt Mortar,	weight 18-x-x (>2,000 lbs), Walker Co, 1856, shot in the muzzle,	Stone Frigate North.
SBML 10-inch 52-cwt Mortar,	weight 18-1-9 (2,053 lbs), shot in the muzzle,	Stone Frigate South.
Armstrong RBL 7-inch 72 cwt Gun,	weight 81-3-3 (9,159 lbs), 1862, Queen Victoria cypher,	mounted on a long wooden carriage, Fort Frederick 4.
Blomefield SBML 12-pounder Gun,	4.75-inch2 foot long gun fragment,	Fort Frederick Tower B.
Blomefield SBML 12-pounder Gun,	4.75-inch, 2 feet 5 inches long, embedded in the road at a 30-degree angle,	Main Gate North.
Blomefield SBML Gun, 4.75-inch,	2 feet 5 inches long, embedded in the road at a 30-degree angle,	Main Gate South.
German Second World War 8.8-cm	7.5 cm Infanteriegeschütz 37 FlaK 37 Anti-Aircraft Gun, (Serial Nr. R5456) 1042 CXX (120),	Crerar Crescent.
German Second World War 8.8-cm Panzerabwehrkanone 43	(8.8-cm PaK 43) Anti-tank Gun, Breeching Ring (Serial Nr. R1243),	Crerar Crescent.
Ordnance QF 25-pounder Gun,	Reg No, 16055,	Massey Library, by the Cadet statue.
M109 155-mm Self-propelled Howitzer,	(Reg. No. 77225), 1985, AC: AX, ECC: 119205 HUI C: 1941, SAUI C: 1941, VMO No. DLE29685, VMO Date: 09 Dec 2002.	Training Aid, RMC.

== Memorials ==
Other	Description
Carriage Lamps on Crerar Gates	donated by Class of 1985
Aircraft Avro CF-100 Canuck Mark 5	In the colours of 414 (electronic Warfare) squadron; presented by the class of 1972; refurbished with the financial support of the ex cadet club and; rededicated on October 6, 1996.
Aircraft Sabre	presented by Class of 1968, refurbished by RMC Club 1996.
Sherman Tank Model A2E8	presented by Class of 1971
Centurion Tank Mark 5	from Class of 1979.
Leopard tank	
Gazebo behind Fort Champlain	from Class of 1966
Information Kiosk - history of RMC and Memorial Arch	Erected as part of Memorial Arch refurbishment project.
Sidewalk- "Route 66" runs via Potters Lodge to Massey Building	from Class of 1966.
3 stained glass windows in Mackenzie Building represent Navy, Army and Air Force designed by Robert Jekyll	from the Class of 1956

== See also ==
- Military history of Canada
- History of the Canadian Army
