= Paget's Horse =

Paget's Horse 19th (Paget's Horse) Battalion, Imperial Yeomanry
- Active: 1900–1902
- Country: United Kingdom
- Branch: British Army
- Type: Yeomanry
- Role: Mounted infantry
- Size: 4 Companies
- Garrison/HQ: Chelsea Barracks
- Nickname: Piccadilly Heroes
- Engagements: Second Boer War; Faber's Put; Elands River; Lichtenburg,

The 19th (Paget's Horse) Battalion was a unit of the Imperial Yeomanry raised by George Paget as auxiliaries to the British Army during the Second Boer War. The men were mainly upper middle class and recruited from the gentlemen's clubs of London. The unit saw action at Faber's Put, Elands River, Lichtenburg, and numerous engagements on the lines of communication. The battalion was disbanded after the war.

== Recruitment ==
Following a string of defeats during Black Week in early December 1899, the British government realised that it would need more troops than just the Regular army to fight the Second Boer War, particularly mounted troops. On 13 December, the War Office decided to allow volunteer forces to serve in the field, and a Royal Warrant was issued on 24 December that officially created the Imperial Yeomanry (IY). This was organised as service companies each of approximately 121 officers and men enlisted for one year. Existing Yeomanry and fresh volunteers quickly filled the new force, which was equipped to operate as mounted infantry.

Besides the companies raised directly by the Yeomanry Cavalry regiments, a number of battalions were formed by enthusiasts, including Paget's Horse, enlisted by George Paget the son of Lord Alfred Paget and grandson of Field Marshal Henry Page, the 1st Marquess of Anglesey. Paget recruited largely from upper middle class members of London gentlemen's clubs and professional men (Trooper Cosmo Rose-Innes, who wrote an account of the first months of the unit, was a barrister at Gray's Inn). Paget's Horse was accepted as the 19th Battalion of the IY

The unit was organised as follows:

- 51st (Paget's) Company
- 52nd (Paget's) Company
- 68th (Paget's) Company
- 73rd (Paget's) Company

Paget himself was not a regular soldier, but had seen some service as a volunteer in the Russo-Turkish War (1877–1878) and the Anglo-Zulu War (1879–80). He served as the battalion's second-in-command with the temporary rank of major.

== Service ==
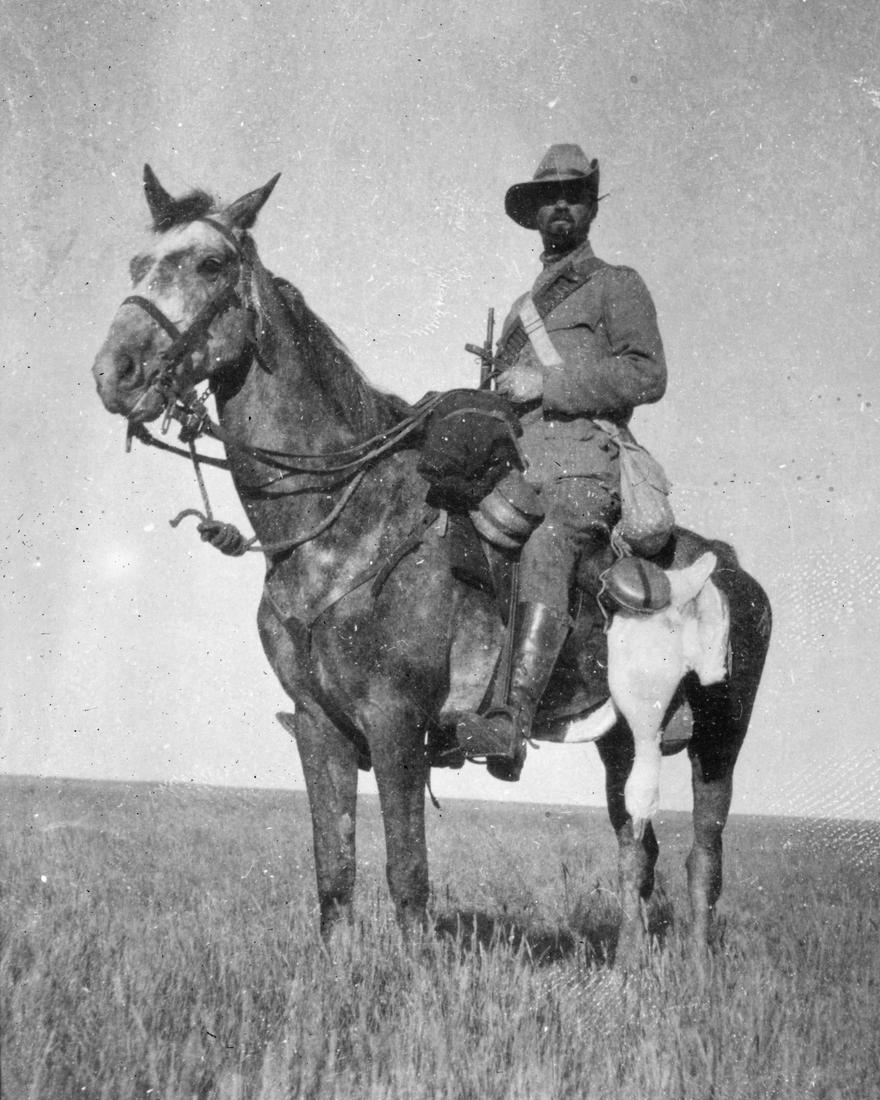
A typical Imperial Yeoman on campaign

The recruits did their basic training daily at Chelsea Barracks (many of the gentlemen arriving for morning drill by Hansom cab), their riding twice-weekly at Knightsbridge Barracks, and their musketry course at Bisley Ranges, all under Regular non-commissioned officers (NCOs) and a Colonial lieutenant attached to the unit. The first three companies embarked at Southampton aboard the troopship SS Tagus on 16 March and disembarked at Cape Town on 4 April; the 73rd Company followed on the SS Delphic on 31 March, arriving on 24 April. The last company had been formally inspected by the Prince of Wales outside Chelsea barracks two days before departure. The battalion was sent to Maitland Camp outside Cape Town where it awaited the arrival of its horses and carried out fatigues and further training. It was next sent to the base camp at Stellenbosch.

The battalion then went up-country to join Lord Roberts' main army on the Orange River. It travelled by train to Belmont, where it continued field training. At the end of April the battalion was assigned to Lieutenant-General Sir Charles Warren's column, which was ordered to suppress Boer rebels in Griqualand West and the Bechuanaland Protectorate. Warren arrived at the Orange River on 4 May and set about organising his column.

=== Faber's Put ===
The IY part of the column, consisting of Pagets Horse, and the 23rd (Lancashire) and 24th (Westmorland and Cumberland) companies of the 8th Bn, were commanded by Charles Hay, the Earl of Erroll. Warren began his advance before all the troops had assembled, and entered Douglas on 21 May. Paget's Horse followed behind. The Boers were at Campbell, blocking the route up onto the Kaap Plateau. On 26 May Warren's column camped at Faber's Put, a farmstead a few miles south of Campbell where he prepared to assault the position. He ordered two companies of Paget's Horse up to cover Schmidt's Drift on the Vaal River by 30 May to prevent the Boers escaping northwestwards, while another detachment of 52nd Company under Lieutenant J.G.B. Lethbridge escorted the column's supply convoy up from Belmont; this arrived on 29 May. Warren had placed insufficient pickets and before dawn on 30 May a force of Boers surrounded the camp at Faber's Put, infiltrated into the garden and prepared to attack. Spotted by a Yeomanry sentry who fired on them, the Boers fired back and a furious firefight ensued, while the Boers stampeded the Yeomanry's horses and shot down gun crews. The 23rd and 24th IY Companies advanced to support their picket on the southern ridge and brought their two Colt machine guns into action. The small group of Paget's Horse protected the machine guns while the rest of the IY advanced by rushes over open ground towards the ridge and drove off the Boers. The Boer force rode off before the Yeomanry could recover their own horses. Lieutenant Lethbridge was among the casualties, his left forearm being shattered, and Trooper Mather was mentioned in despatches for bringing Lethbridge in under heavy fire. Following the action at Faber's Put Warren was able to clear Griqualand West without further trouble, the column entering Campbell and then Griquatown.

After the action Paget's Horse continued guarding Schmidt's Drift and escorting supply convoys from Kimberley for the column, which camped at Blickfontein. When Warren moved on, a detachment of Paget's Horse escorted the Royal Canadian Artillery's guns from Faber's Put to Schmidt's Drift. The concentrated battalion then marched from Schmidt's Drift to Kimberley for rest and refitting before entraining for Mafeking.

=== Elands River ===
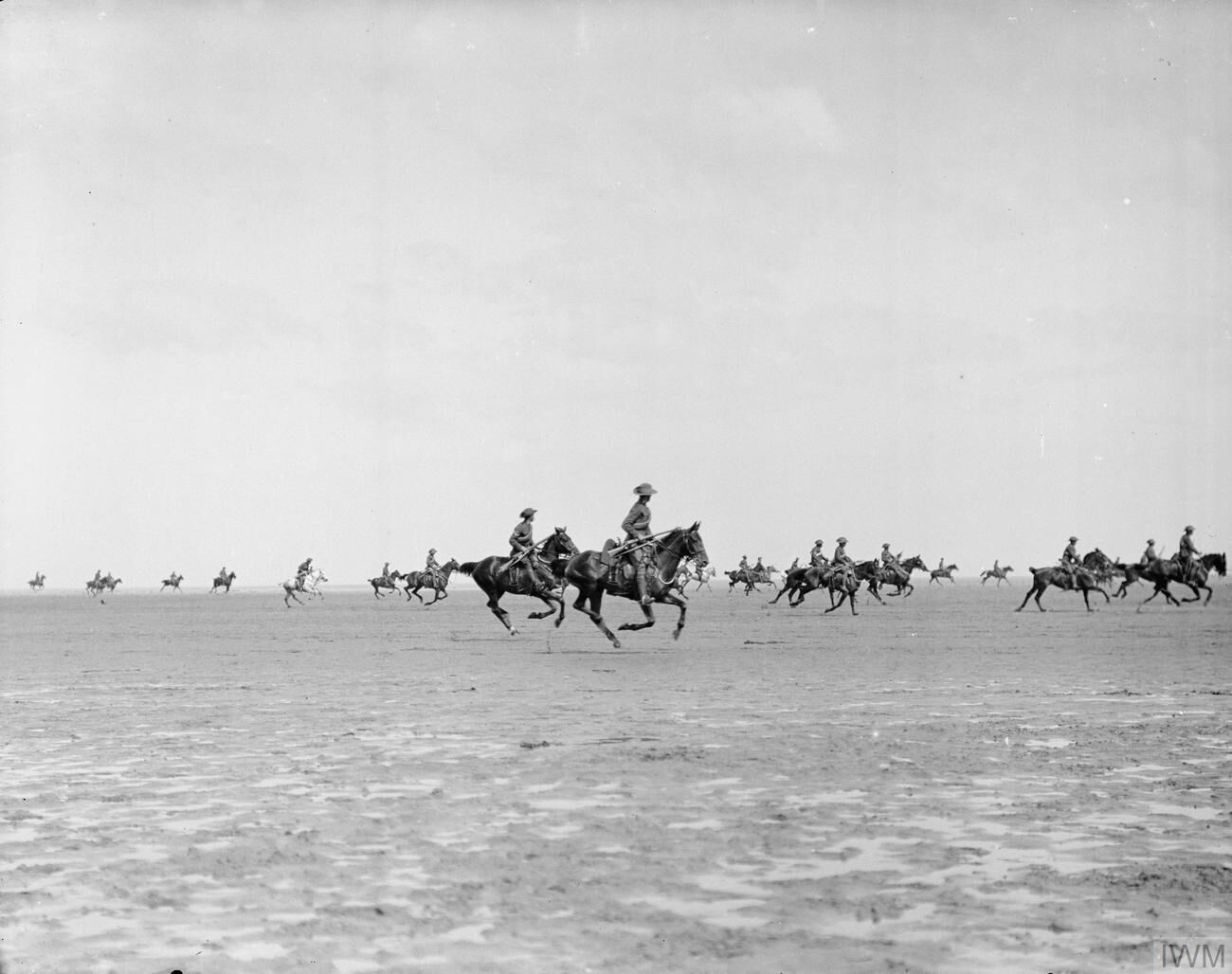
Imperial Yeomanry galloping over a plain during the Second Boer War.

Lord Roberts now decided that his isolated garrisons were a waste of manpower, and he ordered most of them to be evacuated. In early July Warren sent Erroll with a column, including Paget's Horse, to relieve Klerksdorp, but it had surrendered to the Boers on 25 July before he arrived. So he continued to Lichtenburg, taking away the garrison there. Paget's Horse marched through hostile territory from Mafeking to Lichtenburg, posting advance, flank and rear guards, and having daily brushes with small detachments of Boers. Erroll then marched through Ottoshoop to join Lt-Gen Sir Frederick Carrington at Zeerust on 2 August. Carrington's column had come down from Rhodesia to evacuate some of the isolated garrisons in Western Transvaal. Carrington marched the combined force towards the Elands River to cover the retirement of the garrison at Brakfontein. The column was hampered by long train of empty ox-wagons to bring away the supplies at Eland's River, and there was a running fight with the Boers. The action was described by Rose-Innes of Paget's Horse:

'We galloped about from place to place the whole morning without firing a shot, although all round us our guns and pom-poms were throwing a continuous stream of shells, and we could hear the crack-cracking from the opposite kopjes. We were not, I think, under actual fire altogether for more than an hour, although the engagement itself lasted all day'

=== Lines of communication ===
After this inconclusive engagement, Carrington gave up the attempt to reach Brakfontein and returned to Mafeking. Paget's Horse had to fight a dismounted action to clear a Boer force blocking the road back, and Maj Paget was slightly wounded. Paget's Horse went back to its camp at Ottoshoop and spent the following weeks patrolling the road between Zeerust and Lichtenberg, fighting three separate engagements with parties of Boers. In one of these Paget's Horse had to saddle-up and gallop out of Ottoshoop to relieve a detachment of the Victorian Rifles pinned down on a kopje. On arrival they dismounted and fired volleys of suppressive fire at the Boers hidden on the opposing kopje, until the Boers withdrew. A large detachment of Paget's Horse was sent by train to Vryburg to join a relief column for Schweizer-Reneke, which was being besieged by the Boers. The march was unopposed and the unit spent a few days patrolling the surrounding country, experiencing a few contacts with small parties of Boers. Paget's having returned to Vryburg, the Boers once again besieged Schweizer-Reneke. This time the unit had to escort a slow convoy of ox-carts, taking a week to cover 35 miles (56 km). This work was typical of the Guerrilla warfare that characterised the next two years of the war. After two such convoys, the detachment returned to the rest of the battalion at Mafeking.

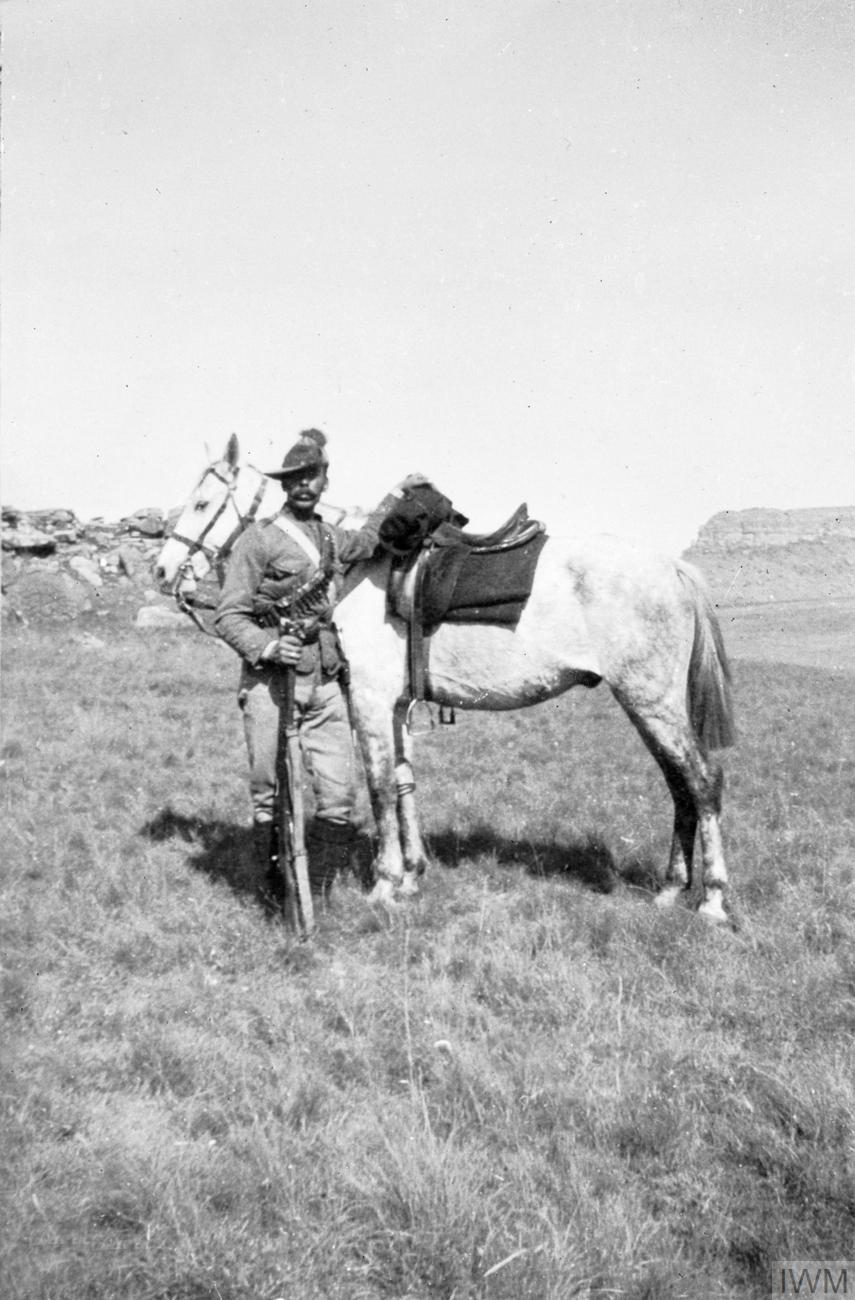
A yeoman standing by his horse in South Africa

=== Lichtenburg ===
In early 1901 a group of Paget's Horse formed part of the garrison of Lichtenburg under the command of Lt-Col C.G.C. Money of the Northumberland Fusiliers. The town contained a large quantity of supplies, but was isolated in hostile territory. At the beginning of March, with the nearest British columns 70–80 miles away, the garrison was attacked by Koos de la Rey. On the night of 2/3 March the Boers penetrated into the town, isolating the outlying pickets and bringing the inner defence line under fire. The defence was obstinate and firing continued until 17.30 on 3 March, all but one of the pickets having been able to hold out. De la Rey withdrew during the following night.

=== Second and third contingents ===
By now the First Contingent of the Imperial Yeomanry had completed their contracted service. Although a few stayed in South Africa with their companies or transferred to other units in the theatre, most went home. They were replaced by raw recruits of the Second Contingent raised under a special Army Order of 17 January 1901. Unlike the original companies based on county Yeomanry regiments, these men were directly recruited into the IY and were drafted as required, but four named battalions (Paget's, the Roughriders, the Sharpshooters and the Duke of Cambridge's Own) were apparently permitted to continue recruiting. The returning men of the first contingent of Paget's Horse paraded at Horse Guards on 26 July 1901 to receive their medals from Queen Alexandra.

On 23 February 1902, 80 men of Paget's Horse were sent as part of an escort for a convoy from Wolmaransstad to Klerksdorp, 50 miles (80 km) away. Towards evening on 24 February the convoy camped and the men of Paget's Horse were allowed to ride on into Klerksdorp. They therefore avoided the following day's disaster when the convoy was ambushed by De la Rey and the escort overwhelmed and taken prisoner after a running battle.

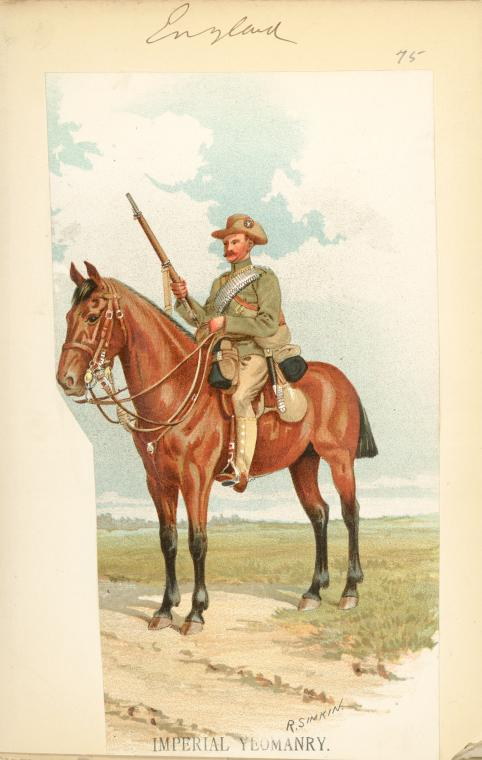
Richard Simkin's painting of an Imperial Yeoman

A Third Contingent for the IY was authorised at the end of 1901 and a number of new battalions went out fully trained. During 1902 the remaining companies still serving in South Africa were consolidated into a smaller number of battalions. The 51st and 73rd (Paget's Horse) Companies transferred to the 12th Battalion.

The war ended with the Treaty of Vereeniging on 31 May 1902, and the IY were progressively repatriated over the following months. Unlike the Roughriders and the Sharpshooters, which were perpetuated by the City of London Yeomanry (Rough Riders) and 3rd County of London Yeomanry (Sharpshooters) respectively, Paget's Horse was not continued as a permanent unit after the war.

== Uniform and insignia ==
Paget's Horse wore the standard khaki foreign service uniform with a bandolier; IY units wore leather gaiters rather than puttees. The headgear (initially the colonial pattern helmet, later the slouch hat) carried a dark grey–blue flash with the letters 'PH' embroidered in yellow, surmounted by a rosette in six alternating segments of blue-grey and yellow. The letters 'PH' gave rise to the unit's nickname of the 'Piccadilly Heroes', but some wits chose to believe that they stood for 'Public House', 'Perfectly Harmless', or even 'Phat-head'.

== See also ==
- List of Imperial Yeomanry units of the Second Boer War
