= André Gauthier (sculptor) =

Canadian artist (1935–2017)

Colonel (Retired) André D. Gauthier OMM CD
- Born: 1935; Ottawa, Ontario, Canada
- Died: October 26, 2017 (aged 81–82)
- Occupations: Monument sculptor and designer

Colonel André D. Gauthier OMM CD (1935 – October 26, 2017) was a Canadian army officer, monument sculptor and designer in various materials including bronze. He also drew in oil paint, charcoal and watercolours.

Many of his works are connected with the Canadian Armed Forces. The Royal Military College of Canada Gauthier Collection consists of 60 sculptures. Others are in collections of Canada and elsewhere. Military units have presented his sculptures to their associated cities. More went to a member of the British royal family, the governor general of Canada, two Canadian prime ministers, Canadian cabinet ministers and dozens of visiting foreign dignitaries. Five of are in permanent collection of the Canadian War Museum.

== Life and work ==
Gauthier was born in 1935 in Ottawa, Ontario, Canada. He was educated in Montreal. He studied at the University of Ottawa on the Regular Officer Training Plan. He served as a troop commander with a reserve armoured regiment, the Régiment de Hull. He was commissioned in May 1958 in the Canadian Provost Corps. He was an infantry platoon commander in the First Battalion, The Queen's Own Rifles of Canada; No 1 Provost Platoon in Calgary, Alberta; the Kingston Provost Detachment and at Base Valcartier, Quebec. From 1962 to 1965, he was posted to Germany with a military police staff appointment and No 4 Provost Platoon. In 1965, he served at the Canadian Forces School of Intelligence and Security in Infantry Phase I Officer Training. He attended the Canadian Army Staff College in Kingston, Ontario. Promoted to major in 1967, he served at Mobile Command Headquarters in St. Hubert, Quebec. In 1969, he became the senior staff officer security.

In 1970, Gauthier was promoted to lieutenant colonel with Regional Civil Emergency Operations Section of Mobile Command, Quebec. In 1973, he served as vice-commandant and director of cadets at Collège militaire royal de Saint-Jean and the Ducros Commission. From 1976 to 1978, Gauthier was assigned as the Canadian Forces attaché to Yugoslavia and Greece. He served as director of security at National Defence Headquarters 1976-1980. He attended the National Defence College in Kingston, in 1980 and 1981, then became chief of staff for Headquarters Prairie Militia Area in Winnipeg, Manitoba.

From 1983 to 1986, Gauthier was in the Canadian delegation to the conventional arms control negotiations (MBFR Talks) between NATO and the Warsaw Pact in Vienna, Austria. From 1986 to 1989, he was commandant of the unit administering Canada's National Defence Headquarters in Ottawa.

== Awards and recognition ==
In November 1989, Gauthier was awarded the Order of Military Merit by Governor General of Canada Jeanne Sauvé.

== Non-military works ==
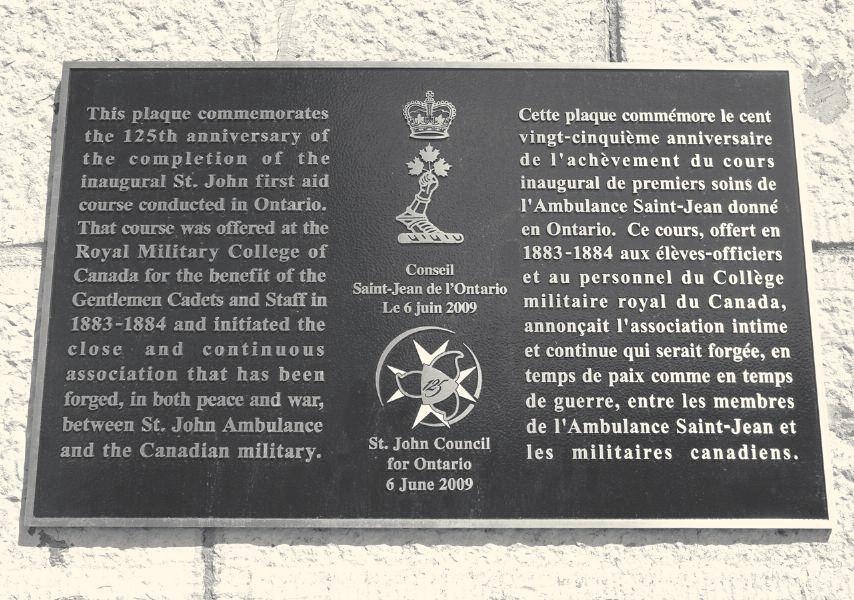
St. John's Ambulance Society of Canada centennial

Non-military subjects by Gauthier include:

- a bronze bas-relief marking the centennial of St. John Ambulance Canada,
- portrait busts.
- a life-size statue 'Madeleine', of his daughter.
- an equestrian statue for Parliament Hill to honour in 1992 the 40th year of Her Majesty The Queen's reign (1990).
- wildlife animal sculptures (1996).

== Exhibits ==
Gauthier's works have been featured in newspaper articles, TV documentaries and radio interviews. His works were exhibited at the Canadian War Museum in Ottawa, at the Mill of Kintail museum in Mississippi Mills, Ontario, at the Military Museum of Canadian Forces Base Petawawa, and at the Royal Military College of Canada Museum. His works were exhibited at the Royal Military College Saint-Jean in the context of the centennial of the Royal 22nd Regiment.
