= Battle of Faber's Put =

1900 battle of the Second Boer War

- Part of Second Boer War
Date	29–30 May 1900
Location	Faber's Put, Cape Colony, South Africa
Result	Anglo-Canadian victory

Belligerents
United Kingdom; Canada	South African Republic

Commanders and leaders
(United Kingdom) Charles Warren (United Kingdom) Earl of Erroll (Canada) Sam Hughes	(South African Republic) Piet De Villers

Strength
900+	600+

Casualties and losses
27 killed 41 wounded	23 killed 33 wounded

The Battle of Faber's Put, also known as the Battle of Faber's Pass, was fought during the Second Boer War on the night of 29–30 May 1900.

== Background ==
As British forces began gaining ground in the Transvaal in the spring of 1900, columns of colonial and British forces were dispatched to the Cape Colony to pursue the Boer Commandos operating in that area. In May, the British pushed towards the Boer capitals of Johannesburg and Pretoria and overwhelmed the garrisons there, capturing and occupying the capitals.

General Warren led a column composed of Canadian and British soldiers across the Northern Cape and halted for supplies at a place known as Faber's Put near Campbell. The British established a camp at Faber's Put, but it was situated on unfavourable ground, surrounded by high ridges which could allow marksmen to fire down into the camp from behind cover.

== Battle ==
Late on the night of 29 May, a force of Boers under the command of General Villers bypassed British sentries and surrounded the encampment at Faber's Put. The Boers opened fire on a section of mounted infantry under the command of the Earl of Erroll which included Paget's Horse and the 23rd and 24th Companies of Imperial Yeomanry, scattering their horses and resulting in high casualties. The firefight woke the rest of the British camp and soon the Canadian Artillery tended to their 12-pounder guns. It was too dark for the guns to be aimed properly, and the Canadians had to hold their fire until daybreak.

As the sun began to rise, two companies of the Duke of Edinburgh's Own Rifles charged the Boers on the eastern side of the encampment, driving them back with assistance from a maxim machine gun section.

At this time, Sam Hughes rallied a mixed body of Yeomanry and Warren's Scouts, leading them in a spirited charge against the Boer positions.

Two teams of Canadians dragged their guns across the field under fire and brought them into action against the Boers on the high ground, losing 9 of 18 men in this action.

After an hour, the combined fire from the artillery and the infantry charge finally broke the Boer attack, forcing them to retreat.

== Aftermath ==
The battle resulted in a British victory, but a costly one. In June, General Warren continued marching his column northwards, linking up with other forces near Kimberley.

In his official report for the battle, General Warren referred to the loss of Colonel Spence stating: "I regret very much the loss of Colonel Spence, [he was] a most gallant and efficient commanding officer".

The following soldiers were mentioned in dispatches by Warren for their actions during the battle:

- Major J. Lewis - Duke of Edinburgh's Own Rifles
- Captain G. Twycross - Duke of Edinburgh's Own Rifles
- Captain W. Simpkins - Duke of Edinburgh's Own Rifles
- Lieutenant W. Prince - Duke of Edinburgh's Own Rifles
- Lieutenant B.J. Thorne - Duke of Edinburgh's Own Rifles
- Sergeant-Major Pearson - Duke of Edinburgh's Own Rifles
- Major Ogilvie - 'E' Battery, Canadian Field Artillery
- Captain Mackie - 'E' Battery, Canadian Field Artillery
- Trooper M.H. Mather - Paget's Horse

Sam Hughes had fought bravely in the battle, leading the countercharge that pushed back and broke the Boer lines. He would continuously campaign to be awarded the Victoria Cross for his actions during the battle, but no such award would be made.

== Casualties ==
=== British ===
- Duke of Edinburgh's Own Rifles

- killed: Col. W.A. Spence, Sgt. Orchard, Pte. Cheverly
- wounded: 4 Privates

- 23rd (Lancashire) Company, 8th Imperial Yeomanry

- killed: Cpl. W. Coulston, LCpl. G.E.M. Barry, Tpr. J.W. Derbyshire, Tpr. F.W. Hackforth, Tpr. P. Orrell, Tpr. D. Rew
- wounded: a number of troopers

- 24th (Westmoreland and Cumberland) Company, 8th Imperial Yeomanry

- killed: Tpr. J.C. Crayston, Tpr. W.R. Day, Tpr. J. Hindson, Tpr. J. Park, Tpr. W. Todd, Tpr. J. Wright
- wounded: a number of troopers

- 52nd (Paget's Horse) Company, 19th Imperial Yeomanry

- killed: Pte. P. Chatterton, Pte. L.W. Finden, Pte. F.A. Hall-Hall, Pte. T.C.P. Pochin, Pte. J. Poole (died of wounds), Pte. J.D.K. Bell (died of wounds)
- wounded: Lt. Lethbridge, a number of troopers

- 'E' Battery, Canadian Field Artillery

- killed: Bdr. William Latimer
- wounded: Cpl. Harland M. Brown, Bdr. J. McCaskill, Dvr. J. Kane, Gnr. C. Wollard, Gnr. G.F. Fletcher, Gnr. C. Jackson, Gnr. G.H. Ross, Gnr. H.B. Taite

=== Boers ===
Killed - 23
Wounded - 33
