= List of Imperial Yeomanry units of the Second Boer War =

Following a string of defeats during Black Week in early December 1899, the British government realised that it would need more troops than just the Regular army to fight the Second Boer War, particularly mounted troops. On 13 December, the War Office decided to allow volunteer forces to serve in the field, and a Royal Warrant was issued on 24 December that officially created the Imperial Yeomanry (IY). This was organised as service companies of 121 officers and men enlisted for one year. Existing Yeomanry and fresh volunteers quickly filled the new force, which was equipped to operate as Mounted infantry. The companies were organised into battalions, often of companies from the same region. Besides the companies raised directly by the Yeomanry Cavalry regiments, a number of companies and battalions were formed by enthusiasts. These included Paget's Horse, the Sharpshooters and the Roughriders, all recruited in London, and the specialists of Lovat's Scouts. On arrival in South Africa, the companies were frequently used piecemeal in various ad hoc columns, and some of the battalions (for example 12th Battalion) never operated as formed units. At the end of their year of service, recruitment of a Second Contingent was authorised in January to replace the time-expired men in the original units and to form new units. A Third Contingent was recruited from late 1901 onwards, largely as new units, while the existing battalions were consolidated.

The following units of Imperial Yeomanry were formed between 1890 and 1902:

Company	Sponsor	Assigned battalion 1900	Assigned battalion 1901	Assigned battalion 1902
First Contingent
1st (Wiltshire)	Royal Wiltshire Yeomanry	1st	1st	1st
2nd (Wiltshire)	Royal Wiltshire Yeomanry	1st	1st	1st
3rd (Gloucestershire)	Royal Gloucestershire Hussars	1st	1st	1st
4th (Glamorgan)	Windham Wyndham-Quin, MP	1st	1st	1st
5th (Warwickshire)	Warwickshire Yeomanry	2nd	2nd	2nd
6th (Staffordshire)	Staffordshire Yeomanry	4th	4th	4th
7th (Leicestershire)	Leicestershire Yeomanry	4th	4th	4th
8th (Derbyshire)	Derbyshire Yeomanry	4th	4th	4th
9th (Yorkshire (Doncaster))	Yorkshire Hussars	3rd	3rd	3rd
10th (Sherwood Rangers)	Sherwood Rangers Yeomanry	3rd	3rd	3rd
11th (Yorkshire Dragoons)	Yorkshire Dragoons	3rd	3rd	3rd
12th (South Nottinghamshire)	South Nottinghamshire Hussars	3rd	3rd	3rd
13th (Shropshire)	Shropshire Yeomanry	5th	5th	5th
14th (Northumberland)	Northumberland Hussars	5th	5th	5th
15th (Northumberland)	Northumberland Hussars	5th	5th	5th
16th (Worcestershire)	Worcestershire Yeomanry	5th	5th	5th
17th (Ayrshire and Lanarkshire)	Ayrshire Yeomanry; Lanarkshire Yeomanry	6th (Scottish)	6th (Scottish)	
18th (Queen's Own Royal Glasgow and Lower Ward of Lanark)	Queen's Own Royal Glasgow and Lower Ward of Lanarkshire Yeomanry	6th (Scottish)	6th (Scottish)	
19th (Lothians and Berwickshire)	Lothians and Berwickshire Yeomanry	6th (Scottish)	6th (Scottish)	
20th (Fife and Forfarshire Light Horse)	1st Fifeshire Mounted Rifles; 1st Forfarshire Light Horse Volunteers	6th (Scottish)	6th (Scottish)	
21st (Cheshire)	Cheshire Yeomanry	2nd	2nd	2nd
22nd (Cheshire)	Cheshire Yeomanry	2nd	2nd	2nd
23rd (Lancashire)	Duke of Lancaster's Own Yeomanry	8th	8th	8th
24th (Westmorland and Cumberland)	Westmorland and Cumberland Yeomanry	8th	8th	8th
25th (West Somerset)	West Somerset Yeomanry	7th	7th	7th
26th (Dorsetshire)	Dorsetshire Yeomanry	7th	7th	7th
27th (Devonshire)	Royal 1st Devon Yeomanry	7th	7th	7th
28th (Bedfordshire) (Compton's Horse)	Lord Alwyne Compton	4th	4th	4th
29th (Denbighshire)	Denbighshire Hussars	9th (Welsh)	9th (Welsh)	9th (Welsh)
30th (Pembrokeshire)	Pembroke Yeomanry	9th (Welsh)	9th (Welsh)	9th (Welsh)
31st (Montgomeryshire)	Montgomeryshire Yeomanry	9th (Welsh)	9th (Welsh)	9th (Welsh)
32nd (Lancashire)	Duke of Lancaster's Own Yeomanry; Lancashire Hussars	2nd	2nd	2nd
33rd (East Kent)	Royal East Kent Yeomanry	11th	11th	11th
34th (Middlesex)	Middlesex Yeomanry	11th	11th	
35th (Middlesex)	Middlesex Yeomanry	11th	11th	
36th (West Kent)	West Kent Yeomanry	11th	11th	11th
37th (Buckinghamshire)	Royal Bucks Hussars	10th	10th	
38th (High Wycombe)	Royal Bucks Hussars	10th	10th	
39th (Berkshire)	Berkshire Yeomanry	10th	10th	
40th (Oxfordshire)	Queen's Own Oxfordshire Hussars	10th	10th	
41st (Hampshire)	Hampshire Carabiniers	12th	?Independent	4th
42nd (Hertfordshire)	Hertfordshire Yeomanry	12th	?Independent	
43rd (Suffolk)	Loyal Suffolk Hussars	12th	?Independent	
44th (Suffolk)	Loyal Suffolk Hussars	12th	?Independent	
45th (Dublin Hunt)	Earl of Longford	13th (Irish)	13th (Irish)	
46th (1st Belfast)		13th (Irish)	13th (Irish)	
47th (Duke of Cambridge's Own)	Earl of Donoughmore	13th (Irish)	13th (Irish)	
48th (North Somerset)	North Somerset Yeomanry	7th	7th	7th
49th (Montgomeryshire)	Montgomeryshire Yeomanry	9th (Welsh)	9th (Welsh)	9th (Welsh)
50th (Hampshire)	Hampshire Carabiniers	17th	17th	
51st (Paget's Horse)	George Paget	19th (Paget's Horse)	19th (Paget's Horse)	
52nd (Paget's Horse)	George Paget	19th (Paget's Horse)	19th (Paget's Horse)	
53rd (East Kent)	Royal East Kent Yeomanry	14th	14th	11th
54th (2nd Belfast)		13th (Irish)	13th (Irish)	
55th (Northumberland)	Northumberland Hussars	14th	14th	5th
56th (Buckinghamshire)	Royal Bucks Hussars	15th	15th	
57th (Buckinghamshire)	Royal Bucks Hussars	15th	15th	
58th (Berkshire)	Berkshire Yeomanry	15th	15th	
59th (Oxfordshire)	Queen's Own Oxfordshire Yeomanry	15th	15th	
60th (North Irish Horse (Belfast))		17th	17th	
61st (South Irish Horse (Dublin))		17th	17th	
62nd (Middlesex)	Middlesex Yeomanry	14th	14th	11th
63rd (Wiltshire)	Royal Wiltshire Yeomanry	16th	16th	1st
64th Company	Not formed			
65th (Leicestershire)	Leicestershire Yeomanry	17th	17th	
66th (Yorkshire)	Yorkshire Dragoons; Yorkshire Hussars	16th	16th	3rd
67th (Sharpshooters)	Earl of Dunraven	18th (Sharpshooters)	18th (Sharpshooters)	18th (Sharpshooters)
68th (Paget's Horse)	George Paget	19th (Paget's Horse)	19th (Paget's Horse)	
69th (Sussex)	Sussex Yeomanry	14th	14th	7th
70th (Scottish) (Sharpshooters)	Earl of Dunraven	18th (Sharpshooters)	18th (Sharpshooters)	18th (Sharpshooters)
71st (Sharpshooters)	Earl of Dunraven	18th (Sharpshooters)	18th (Sharpshooters)	18th (Sharpshooters)
72nd (Rough Riders)	Earl of Lathom	20th (Rough Riders)	20th (Rough Riders)	
73rd (Paget's Horse)	George Paget	19th (Paget's Horse)	19th (Paget's Horse)	
74th (Dublin)		16th	16th	8th
75th (Sharpshooters)	Earl of Dunraven	18th (Sharpshooters)	18th (Sharpshooters)	18th (Sharpshooters)
76th (Rough Riders)	Earl of Lathom	20th (Rough Riders)	20th (Rough Riders)	22nd (Roughriders)
77th (Manchester)	Lancashire Hussars	8th	8th	4th
78th (Rough Riders)	Earl of Lathom	20th (Rough Riders)	20th (Rough Riders)	22nd (Roughriders)
79th (Rough Riders)	Earl of Lathom	20th (Rough Riders)	20th (Rough Riders)	
Second Contingent
80th (Sharpshooters)	Earl of Dunraven		21st (2nd Sharpshooters)	21st (2nd Sharpshooters)
81st (Sharpshooters)	Earl of Dunraven		21st (2nd Sharpshooters)	21st (2nd Sharpshooters)
82nd (Sharpshooters)	Earl of Dunraven		21st (2nd Sharpshooters)	21st (2nd Sharpshooters)
83rd (Sharpshooters)	Earl of Dunraven		21st (2nd Sharpshooters)	21st (2nd Sharpshooters)
84th (Rough Riders)	Earl of Lathom		22nd (Rough Riders)	
85th (Rough Riders)	Earl of Lathom		22nd (Rough Riders)	
86th (Rough Riders)	Earl of Lathom		22nd (Rough Riders)	24th (Metropolitan Mounted Rifles)
87th (Rough Riders)	Earl of Lathom		22nd (Rough Riders)	24th (Metropolitan Mounted Rifles)
88th (Welsh Yeomanry)	Montgomeryshire Yeomanry		9th (Welsh)	9th (Welsh)
89th (Montgomeryshire)	Montgomeryshire Yeomanry		9th (Welsh)	9th (Welsh)
90th (Sharpshooters)	Earl of Dunraven		23rd (3rd Sharpshooters)	23rd (3rd Sharpshooters)
91st (Sharpshooters)	Earl of Dunraven		23rd (3rd Sharpshooters)	
92nd (Sharpshooters)	Earl of Dunraven		23rd (3rd Sharpshooters)	
93rd (Sharpshooters)	Earl of Dunraven		23rd (3rd Sharpshooters)	23rd (3rd Sharpshooters)
94th (Metropolitan Mounted Rifles)			24th (Metropolitan Mounted Rifles)	24th (Metropolitan Mounted Rifles)
95th (Metropolitan Mounted Rifles)			24th (Metropolitan Mounted Rifles)	
96th (Metropolitan Mounted Rifles)			24th (Metropolitan Mounted Rifles)	24th (Metropolitan Mounted Rifles)
97th (Metropolitan Mounted Rifles)			24th (Metropolitan Mounted Rifles)	
98th (North Riding of Yorkshire Volunteer Artillery)	1st North Riding Artillery Volunteers		3rd	
99th (Irish)			8th	
100th (Northumberland)	Northumberland Hussars		5th	5th
101st (Northumberland)	Northumberland Hussars		5th	5th
102nd (Worcestershire)	Worcestershire Yeomanry		5th	
103rd (Warwickshire)	Warwickshire Yeomanry		2nd	2nd
104th (Derbyshire)	Derbyshire Yeomanry		4th	4th
105th (Northumberland)	Northumberland Hussars		5th	8th
106th (Staffordshire)	Staffordshire Yeomanry		4th	4th
107th (Lanarkshire)	Lanarkshire Yeomanry		6th (Scottish)	
108th (Royal Glasgow)	Queen's Own Royal Glasgow Yeomanry		6th (Scottish)	
109th (Yorkshire Hussars)	Yorkshire Hussars		3rd	3rd
110th (Northumberland)	Northumberland Hussars		2nd	2nd
111th (Yorkshire Dragoons)	Yorkshire Dragoons		3rd	3rd
112th (Middlesex)	Middlesex Yeomanry		11th	11th
113th (Lovat's Scouts)	Lord Lovat		Independent	Independent
114th (Lovat's Scouts)	Lord Lovat		Independent	Independent
Third Contingent
115th (Sharpshooters)	Earl of Dunraven			25th (Sharpshooters)
116th (Sharpshooters)	Earl of Dunraven			25th (Sharpshooters)
117th (Sharpshooters)	Earl of Dunraven			25th (Sharpshooters)
118th (Sharpshooters)	Earl of Dunraven			25th (Sharpshooters)
119th (Younghusband's Horse)	Lt-Col George Younghusband			26th (Younghusband's Horse)
120th (Younghusband's Horse)	Lt-Col George Younghusband			26th (Younghusband's Horse)
121st (Younghusband's Horse)	Lt-Col George Younghusband			26th (Younghusband's Horse)
122nd (Younghusband's Horse)	Lt-Col George Younghusband			26th (Younghusband's Horse)
123rd				27th
124th				27th
125th				27th
126th				27th
127th (Westminster Dragoons)				28th (Westminster Dragoons)
128th (Westminster Dragoons)				28th (Westminster Dragoons)
129th (Westminster Dragoons)				28th (Westminster Dragoons)
130th (Westminster Dragoons)				28th (Westminster Dragoons)
131st (Irish Horse)				29th (Irish Horse)
132nd (Irish Horse)				29th (Irish Horse)
133rd (Irish Horse)				29th (Irish Horse)
134th (Irish Horse)				29th (Irish Horse)
135th				30th
136th				30th
137th				30th
138th				30th
139th (Fincastle's Horse)	Lt-Col Viscount Fincastle			31st (Fincastle's Horse)
140th (Fincastle's Horse)	Lt-Col Viscount Fincastle			31st (Fincastle's Horse)
141st (Fincastle's Horse)	Lt-Col Viscount Fincastle			31st (Fincastle's Horse)
142nd (Fincastle's Horse)	Lt-Col Viscount Fincastle			31st (Fincastle's Horse)
143rd				32nd
144th				32nd
145th				32nd
146th				32nd
147th				33rd
148th				33rd
149th				33rd
150th				33rd
151st				34th
152nd				34th
153rd				34th
154th				34th
155th				35th
156th				35th
157th				35th
158th				35th
159th				36th
160th				36th
161st				36th
162nd				36th
163rd				37th (Highland Horse)
164th				37th (Highland Horse)
165th				37th (Highland Horse)
166th				37th (Highland Horse)
167th				38th
168th				38th
169th				38th
170th				38th
171st				39th
172nd				39th
173rd				39th
174th				39th
175th (Irish Horse)				29th (Irish Horse)
176th (Irish Horse)				29th (Irish Horse)
177th (Fincastle's Horse)	Lt-Col Viscount Fincastle			31st (Fincastle's Horse)
178th (Lovat's Scouts)	Lord Lovat		Independent	Independent

The mounted infantry experiment was considered a success and the existing Yeomanry regiments at home were reorganised and renamed as Imperial Yeomanry in 1901. Fresh regiments were also raised, often on the basis of returned veterans, such as the City of London Yeomanry (Rough Riders) and the 3rd County of London Yeomanry (Sharpshooters), the North Irish and South Irish Horse, and the Lovat Scouts.
