= Orlando Norie =

British artist (1832–1901)

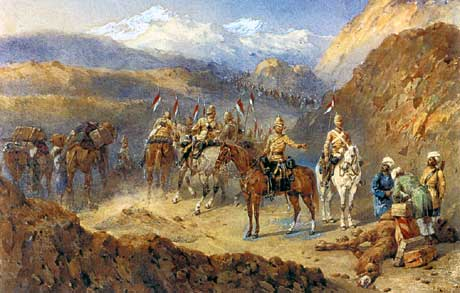
The 9th Queen's Royal Lancers during Sir Frederick Roberts' march to Kandahar 1879 by Orlando Norrie

Orlando Norie (1832–1901), artist of military subjects, was perhaps the most prolific painter of the British army in the 19th century along with Richard Simkin. It has been estimated that Norie alone painted well over 5,000 pictures. Although his family were of Scottish descent, they had moved to the continent, and Orlando was born in Bruges, Belgium on 15 January 1832. He spent most of his working life in Dunkirk where he painted many scenes, primarily in watercolor by the firm of Rudolf Ackermann.

His work was first recognised in the autumn of 1854 when his print of the Battle of the Alma was advertised. This was followed by prints of the Battle of Inkerman and the Battle of Balaclava, all for Ackermann's. This company's Eclipse Sporting and Military Gallery served as an outlet for many of the artist's watercolors. Norie was viewed as the natural successor to Henry Martens, and Ackermann's were so pleased with his work that they occasionally profiled him in exhibitions, one of which was staged in 1873 to showcase his pictures of the recent Autumn Manoeuvres held in September and October 1871 around Aldershot and the Surrey heaths.

A watercolour painting depicting the Battle of Fuentes de Oñoro 5 May 1811, by Orlando Norie (1832–1901) is in the collection of the Royal Military College of Canada

His grave is in the old cemetery of Dunkirk adjacent to the Commonwealth War cemetery. Today, many of his pictures can be seen in British regimental museums and clubs.
