= Richard Simkin =

English artist (1850–1926)

Richard Simkin (5 November 1850 – 25 June 1926) was an English artist who specialised in illustrating military uniforms.

== Biography ==
Born in Conduit Street London , on 5 November 1850, the son of a commercial traveller, also named Richard. He spent much of his time in Aldershot, Hampshire, after marrying his wife, Harriet in 1880, and was also a volunteer in the Artists Rifles. He was employed by the War Office to design recruiting posters, and to illustrate the Army and Navy Gazette. In 1901 he created a series of 'Types of the Indian Army' for the Gazette; he obtained much of the information from the Colonial and India Exhibition of 1886. During his lifetime, he, along with Orlando Norie produced thousands of watercolours depicting the uniforms and campaigns of the British Army. Simkin also contributed illustrations to numerous publications including the Boy's Own Magazine, The Graphic and others; many were published by Raphael Tuck and sons.

He died at his home at 7 Cavendish Street, Herne Bay on 25 June 1926, survived by his wife and two daughters. Today, his pictures can be seen in numerous regimental museums and his illustrations appear in regimental histories, while watercolours frequently come up for auction.

== Publications ==
- The War in Egypt. London: George Routledge, 1883
- Our Soldiers and Sailors in Egypt. London: George Routledge, 1885
- Uniforms of the British Army, in Twelve Representative Plates. London: Halford Bros, 1886
- Military Types. London: George Berridge, 1888–1902
- Life in the Army. London: Chapman & Hall, 1889
- A Book of Soldiers. London: Perry., c. 1890
- Following the Drum. London: William Allen, c. 1890
- Where Glory Calls. The Soldier's Scrap Book. London: William Allen, c. 1890
- The Royal Military Tournament. London: Frederick Warne, c. 1890
- The Boy's Books of British Battles from 1704 to 1882. London: George Routledge, c. 1890
- Our Armies. London: Sampson Low, Marston, 1891
- British Soldiers Past and Present: Their Dress and Equipment from 1600 to Date. London: Frederick Warne, c. 1894
- Armed Europe. London: Raphael Tuck, c. 1895
- The Army. London: George Routledge, c. 1900
- The Great Powers of the World. London: Dean, c. 1900
- Soldiers of the Queen. London: Thomas Nelson, c. 1900
- Soldiers of the Century. London: Dean, 1901
- Sailors of the Century. London: Dean, 1901

== Gallery ==
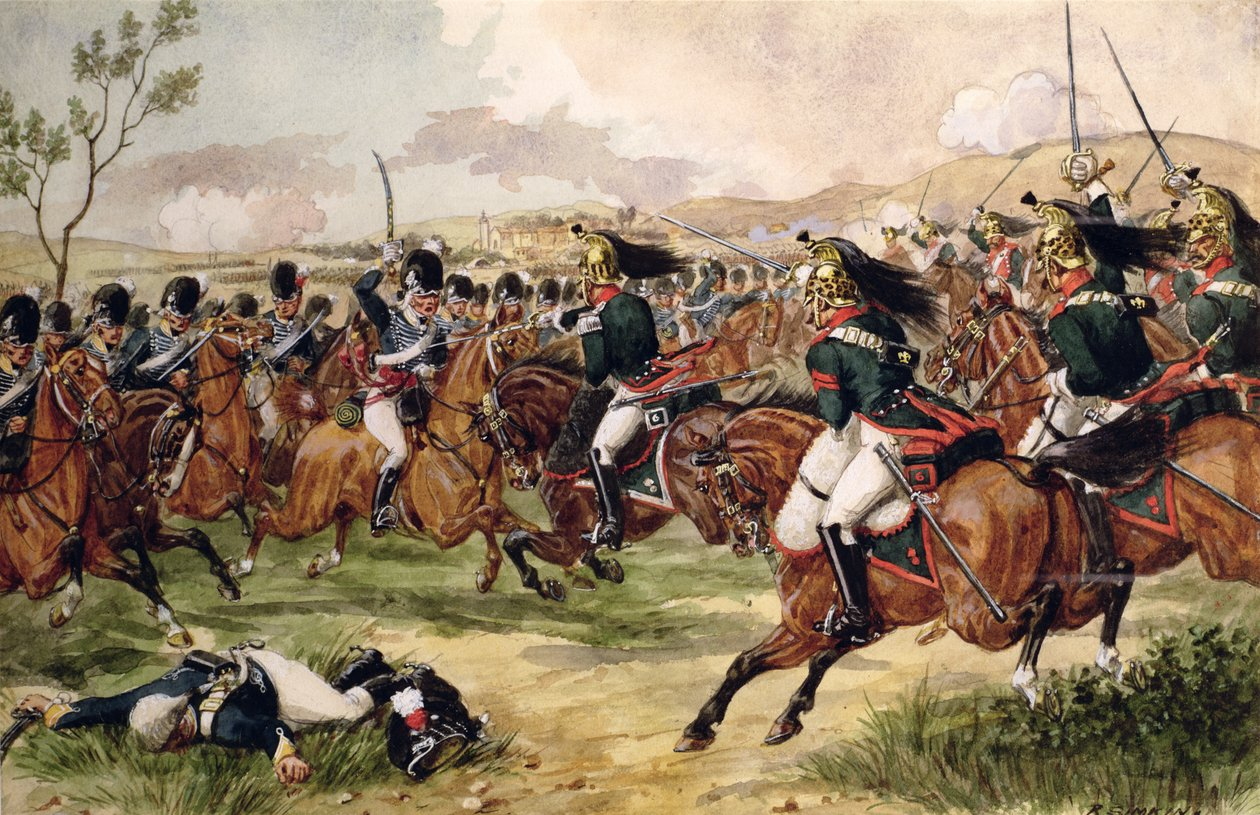
The 20th Light Dragoons at the Battle of Vimeiro, 21st August 1808

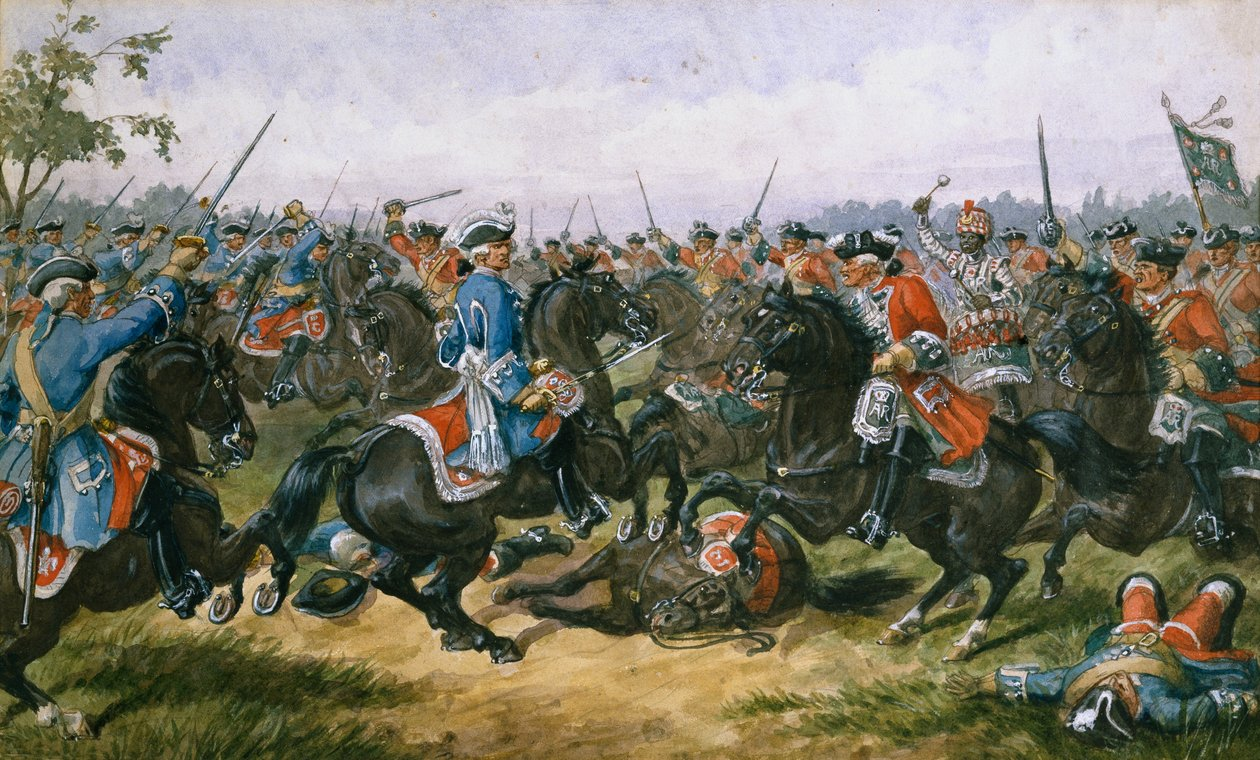
Battle of Malplaquet

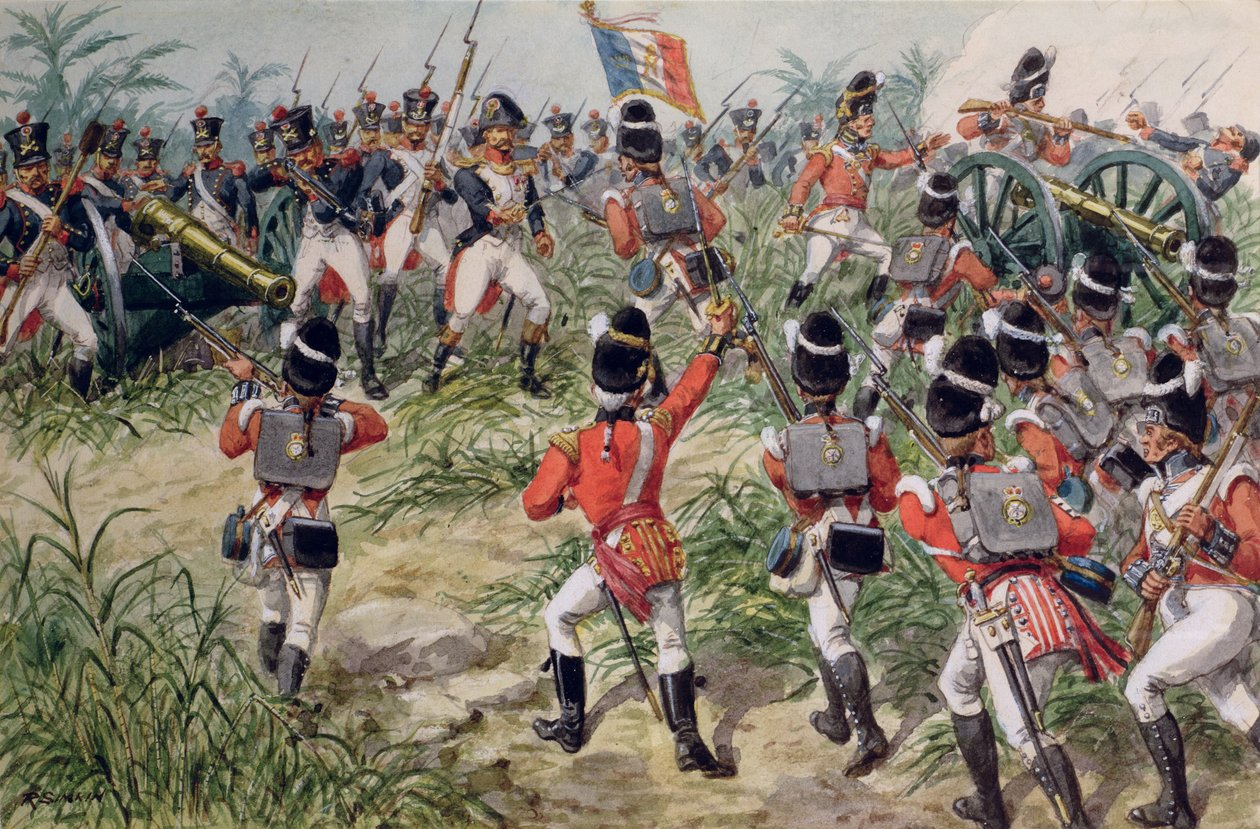
The Charge of the 7th Foot Royal Fusiliers, Martinique, 1st February, 1809

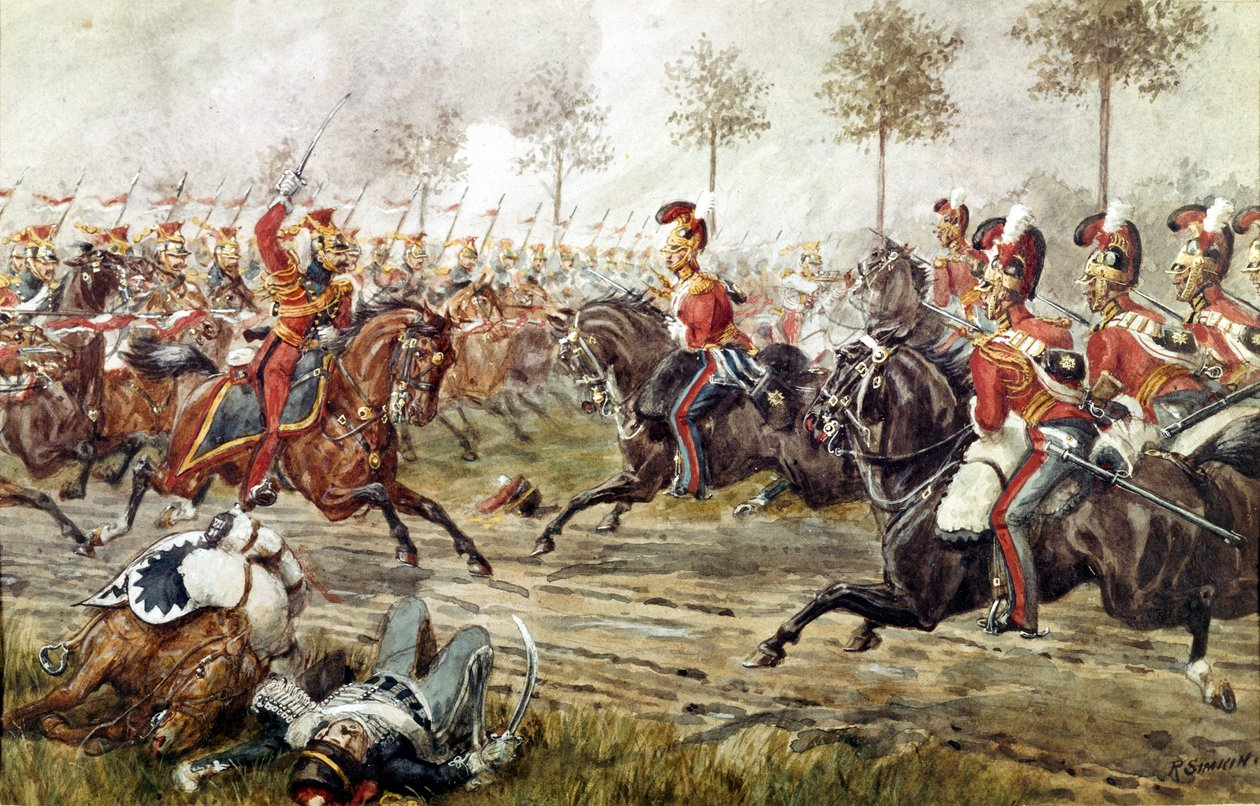
Charge of the 1st Life Guards at Genappe, 17 June 1815 (c. 1890)

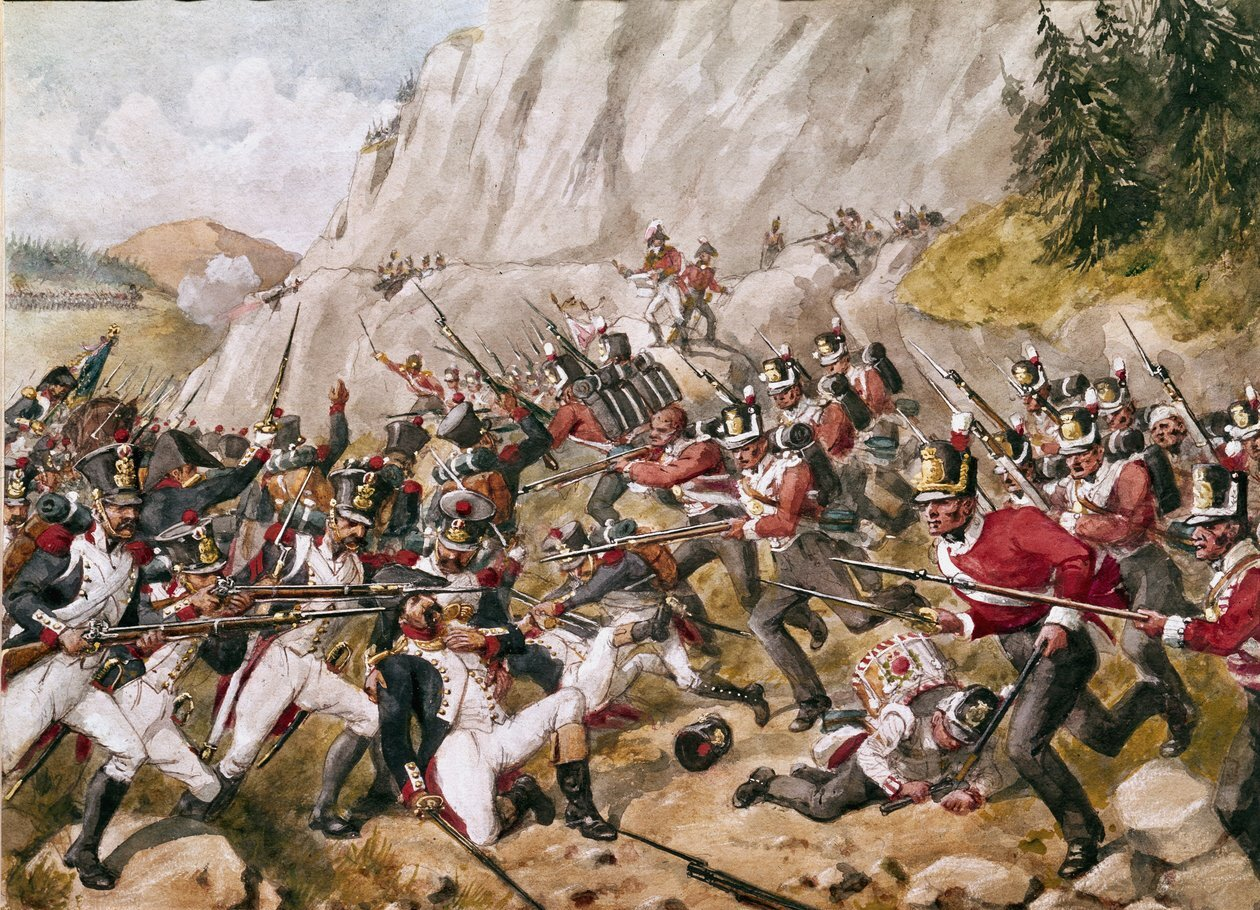
Busaco, September 27th 1810

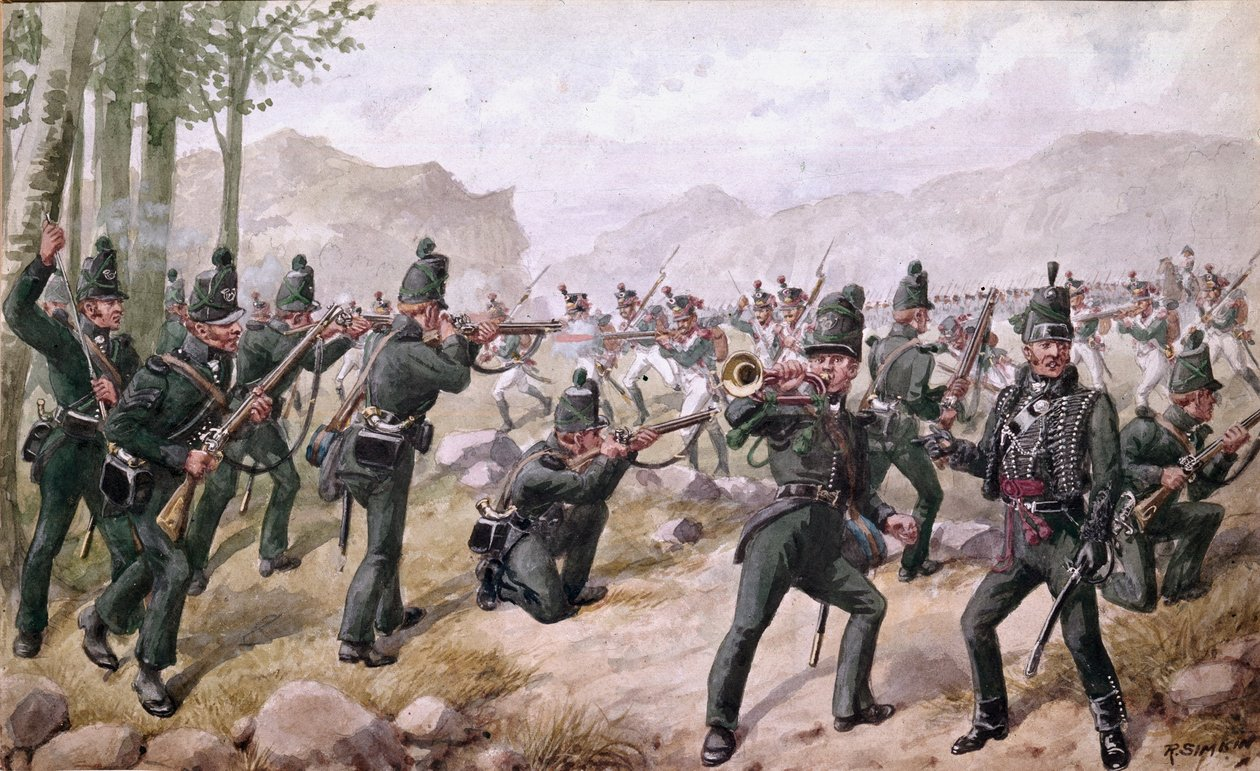
Battle of the Pyrenees, 1813 (1900)
