= 9th Cyclist Brigade =

2/1st Lowland Mounted Brigade 20th Mounted Brigade 13th Cyclist Brigade 9th Cyclist Brigade
- Active: 1914–1918
- Country: United Kingdom
- Branch: British Army
- Type: Yeomanry; Bicycle infantry
- Size: Brigade
- Service: World War I

The 20th Mounted Brigade previously known as the 2/1st Lowland Mounted Brigade was a 2nd Line yeomanry brigade of the British Army during the First World War. In July 1916 it was converted to a cyclist formation as 13th Cyclist Brigade and in November 1916 was redesignated as 9th Cyclist Brigade. It was still in existence, in Ireland, at the end of the war.

== Mounted Brigade ==
In accordance with the Territorial and Reserve Forces Act 1907 (7 Edw.7, c.9) which brought the Territorial Force into being, the TF was intended to be a home defence force for service during wartime and members could not be compelled to serve outside the country. However, on the outbreak of war on 4 August 1914, many members volunteered for Imperial Service. Therefore, TF units were split in August and September 1914 into 1st Line (liable for overseas service) and 2nd Line (home service for those unable or unwilling to serve overseas) units. Later, a 3rd Line was formed to act as a reserve, providing trained replacements for the 1st and 2nd Line regiments. Similarly, by 1915 most 2nd Line yeomanry regiments were formed into 2nd Line mounted brigades with the same title and composition as the pre-war 1st Line formations. Two other 2nd Line brigades (2/1st Southern Mounted Brigade and 2/1st Western Mounted Brigade) without 1st Line antecedents were also formed.

2/1st Lowland Mounted Brigade was a mirror formation of the 1st Line Lowland Mounted Brigade. It was raised in Scotland and had under command the 2/1st Ayrshire (Earl of Carrick's Own) Yeomanry, the 2/1st Lanarkshire Yeomanry, and the 2/1st Lothians and Border Horse. By March 1916, the brigade was at Dunbar, East Lothian. On 31 March 1916, the remaining Mounted Brigades were ordered to be numbered in a single sequence and the brigade became 21st Mounted Brigade, still at Dunbar under Scottish Command.

== Cyclist Brigade ==
In July 1916 there was a major reorganization of 2nd Line yeomanry units in the United Kingdom. All but 12 regiments were converted to cyclists and as a consequence the brigade was converted to 13th Cyclist Brigade. Further reorganization in October and November 1916 saw the brigade redesignated as 9th Cyclist Brigade in November, still at Dunbar. (Note: The original 9th Cyclist Brigade was renumbered as 5th Cyclist Brigade. Another 13th Cyclist Brigade was formed in September 1917 by the conversion of 3rd Mounted Brigade in 2/2nd Mounted Division (which became The Cyclist Division).) In July 1917, 2/1st Lothians and Border Horse moved to Haddington.

About May 1918 the Brigade moved to Ireland. 2/1st Ayrshire was stationed at Omagh, County Tyrone, the 2/1st Lanarkshire at Derry, and the 2/1st Lothians and Border Horse at Londonderry and Enniskillen, County Fermanagh. There were no further changes before the end of the war.

== See also ==
- Lowland Mounted Brigade for the 1st Line formation
- British yeomanry during the First World War
- Second line yeomanry regiments of the British Army

== Bibliography ==
- Becke, Archibald F. (1936). Order of Battle of Divisions Part 2A. The Territorial Force Mounted Divisions and the 1st-Line Territorial Force Divisions (42–56). London: HMSO. OCLC 4405016.
- James, Brigadier E.A. (1978). British Regiments 1914–18. London: Samson Books Limited. ISBN 0-906304-03-2.
- Rinaldi, Richard A (2008). Order of Battle of the British Army 1914. Ravi Rikhye. ISBN 978-0-97760728-0.
