= Lowland Mounted Brigade =

- Active: 1908–February 1916
- Country: United Kingdom
- Branch: British Army
- Type: Yeomanry
- Size: Brigade
- HQ (peacetime): Edinburgh
- Engagements: World War I Gallipoli 1915

The Lowland Mounted Brigade was a formation of the Territorial Force of the British Army, organised in 1908. After service in the Gallipoli Campaign, it was absorbed into the 1st Dismounted Brigade in February 1916.

== Formation ==
Under the terms of the Territorial and Reserve Forces Act 1907 (7 Edw.7, c.9), the brigade was formed in 1908 as part of the Territorial Force. It consisted of three yeomanry regiments, a horse artillery battery and ammunition column, a transport and supply column and a field ambulance. The Lanarkshire Yeomanry (Queen's Own Royal Glasgow and Lower Ward of Lanarkshire) was attached for training in peacetime.

As the name suggests, the units were drawn from the Scottish Lowlands.

== World War I ==
The brigade was embodied on 4 August 1914. It moved to Cupar, Fife on coast defence duties. It remained in Scotland until September 1915 when it was dismounted.

The Queen's Own Royal Glasgow Yeomanry (attached in peacetime) joined the brigade on mobilisation as a fourth regiment, but left in May 1915 to be split up as divisional cavalry. The Lothians and Border Horse likewise left in the summer of 1915 to be split up as divisional cavalry.

=== Gallipoli ===
In late September 1915, the brigade (just two regiments strong, Ayrshire Yeomanry and Lanarkshire Yeomanry) left Fife for Devonport. On 27 September it boarded SS Arcadian and sailed for Gallipoli. It landed at Cape Helles on 11 October and was attached to 52nd (Lowland) Division. It remained attached to 52nd (Lowland) Division in Gallipoli until 30 December when it was evacuated to Mudros.

=== Egypt ===
The Lowland Mounted Brigade was transferred to Egypt, arriving on 7 February 1916 and was immediately absorbed into the 1st Dismounted Brigade (along with the Scottish Horse Mounted Brigade). In October 1916, the remnants of the 1st Dismounted Brigade (Ayrshire Yeomanry and Lanarkshire Yeomanry) were absorbed into 2nd Dismounted Brigade which was later renamed as 229th Brigade in the 74th (Yeomanry) Division.

== See also ==
- 2/1st Lowland Mounted Brigade for the 2nd Line formation
- British yeomanry during the First World War

== Bibliography ==
- Becke, Archibald F. (1936). Order of Battle of Divisions Part 2A. The Territorial Force Mounted Divisions and the 1st-Line Territorial Force Divisions (42–56). London: HMSO. OCLC 4405016.
- Becke, Archibald F. (1937). Order of Battle of Divisions Part 2B. The 2nd-Line Territorial Force Divisions (57th–69th) with The Home-Service Divisions (71st–73rd) and 74th and 75th Divisions. London: HMSO. OCLC 4405016.
- James, Brigadier E.A. (1978). British Regiments 1914–18. London: Samson Books Limited. ISBN 0-906304-03-2.
- Rinaldi, Richard A (2008). Order of Battle of the British Army 1914. Ravi Rikhye. ISBN 978-0-97760728-0.
- Westlake, Ray (1992). British Territorial Units 1914-18. Osprey Publishing. ISBN 978-1-85532-168-7.
- Westlake, Ray (1996). British Regiments at Gallipoli. Barnsley: Leo Cooper. ISBN 0-85052-511-X.
