= Lanarkshire Yeomanry =

- Cap badge of the Lanarkshire Yeomanry
- Active: 1819 – 1999
- Country: United Kingdom
- Branch: British Army
- Type: Cavalry
- Role: Yeomanry
- Part of: 74th (Yeomanry) Division (First World War); Royal Artillery (Second World War); Royal Armoured Corps (Current)
- Engagements: Second Boer War; First World War Gallipoli 1915 Egypt 1915–17 Palestine 1917–18 France and Flanders 1918 Second World War Malaya 1941–42 Sicily 1943 Italy 1943–45 North-West Europe 1945
- Battle honours: See battle honours below

The Lanarkshire Yeomanry was a yeomanry regiment of the British Army, first raised in 1819, which served as a dismounted infantry regiment in the First World War and provided two field artillery regiments in the Second World War, before being amalgamated into The Queen's Own Lowland Yeomanry in 1956. Its lineage was revived by B (Lanarkshire and Queen's Own Royal Glasgow Yeomanry) Squadron, the Scottish Yeomanry in 1992 until that unit was disbanded in 1999.

== History ==
=== Formation and early history ===
The units which would become the regiment were first raised in 1819, as independent troops of yeomanry around Lanarkshire. The five existing troops were regimented in 1848 as the Upper Ward and Airdrie Corps of Lanarkshire Yeomanry Cavalry, later retitled as the Lanarkshire Regiment of Yeomanry Cavalry.

=== Second Boer War ===
The Yeomanry was not intended to serve overseas, but due to the string of defeats during Black Week in December 1899, the British government realized they were going to need more troops than just the regular army. A Royal Warrant was issued on 24 December 1899 to allow volunteer forces to serve in the Second Boer War. The Royal Warrant asked standing Yeomanry regiments to provide service companies of approximately 115 men each for the Imperial Yeomanry. With the Ayrshire Yeomanry, the regiment co-sponsored the 17th (Ayrshire and Lanarkshire) Company for the 6th (Scottish) Battalion in 1900; in 1901 it provided the 107th (Lanarkshire) Company.

In 1901, the regiment was reorganized as mounted infantry as the Lanarkshire Imperial Yeomanry. In 1908 it was transferred into the Territorial Force, returning to a cavalry role and equipping as lancers, under the new title of the Lanarkshire Yeomanry. The regiment was based at Broomgate in Lanark during the first half of the 20th century. (Note: It is unclear when the regiment actually arrived at Broomgate and it may have been after the First World War)

=== First World War ===
In accordance with the Territorial and Reserve Forces Act 1907 (7 Edw. 7, c.9) which brought the Territorial Force into being, the TF was intended to be a home defence force for service during wartime and members could not be compelled to serve outside the country. However, on the outbreak of war on 4 August 1914, many members volunteered for Imperial Service. Therefore, TF units were split in August and September 1914 into 1st Line (liable for overseas service) and 2nd Line (home service for those unable or unwilling to serve overseas) units. Later, a 3rd Line was formed to act as a reserve, providing trained replacements for the 1st and 2nd Line regiments.

==== 1/1st Lanarkshire Yeomanry ====
The regiment mobilised into the Lowland Mounted Brigade in August 1914, but remained in England until 1915. They landed at Gallipoli in September 1915, serving as dismounted infantry, and were attached to 52nd (Lowland) Division in October; they were withdrawn in January 1916 and moved to Egypt. In early 1917 the regiment was amalgamated with The Ayrshire Yeomanry to form the 12th (Ayr and Lanark Yeomanry) Battalion, Royal Scots Fusiliers in 74th (Yeomanry) Division, seeing service in the Palestine campaign before moving to the Western Front in May 1918. Whilst on the Western Front, Sergeant Thomas Caldwell of the regiment was awarded a Victoria Cross.

==== 2/1st Lanarkshire Yeomanry ====
The 2nd Line regiment was formed in 1914. In 1915 it was under the command of the 2/1st Lowland Mounted Brigade in Scotland (along with the 2/1st Ayrshire (Earl of Carrick's Own) Yeomanry and the 2/1st Lothians and Border Horse) and by March 1916 was at Dunbar, East Lothian. On 31 March 1916, the remaining Mounted Brigades were numbered in a single sequence and the brigade became 20th Mounted Brigade, still at Dunbar under Scottish Command.

In July 1916 there was a major reorganization of 2nd Line yeomanry units in the United Kingdom. All but 12 regiments were converted to cyclists and as a consequence the regiment was dismounted and the brigade converted to 13th Cyclist Brigade. Further reorganization in October and November 1916 saw the brigade redesignated as 9th Cyclist Brigade in November, still at Dunbar.

About May 1918 the Brigade moved to Ireland and the regiment was stationed at Derry. There were no further changes before the end of the war.

==== 3/1st Lanarkshire Yeomanry ====
The 3rd Line regiment was formed in 1915 and in the summer was affiliated to a Reserve Cavalry Regiment at Aldershot. In June 1916 it left the Reserve Cavalry Regiment and went to Perth. The regiment was disbanded in early 1917 with personnel transferring to the 2nd Line regiment or to the 5th (Reserve) Battalion of the Cameronians (Scottish Rifles) at Leven.

=== Between the wars ===
Post war, a commission was set up to consider the shape of the Territorial Force (Territorial Army from 1 October 1921). The experience of the First World War made it clear that cavalry was surfeit. The commission decided that only the 14 most senior regiments were to be retained as cavalry (though the Lovat Scouts and the Scottish Horse were also to remain mounted as "scouts"). Eight regiments were converted to Armoured Car Companies of the Royal Tank Corps (RTC), one was reduced to a battery in another regiment, one was absorbed into a local infantry battalion, one became a signals regiment and two were disbanded. The remaining 25 regiments were converted to brigades (Note: The basic organic unit of the Royal Artillery was, and is, the Battery. When grouped together they formed brigades, in the same way that infantry battalions or cavalry regiments were grouped together in brigades. At the outbreak of the First World War, a field artillery brigade of headquarters (4 officers, 37 other ranks), three batteries (5 and 193 each), and a brigade ammunition column (4 and 154) had a total strength just under 800 so was broadly comparable to an infantry battalion (just over 1,000) or a cavalry regiment (about 550). Like an infantry battalion, an artillery brigade was usually commanded by a Lieutenant-Colonel. Artillery brigades were redesignated as regiments in 1938.) of the Royal Field Artillery between 1920 and 1922. As the 13th most senior regiment in the order of precedence, the regiment was retained as horsed cavalry.

Future Prime Minister Alec Douglas-Home, then Lord Dunglass, served in the regiment from commission as a Lieutenant in 1924, rising to Major in 1933.

=== Second World War ===
The regiment apparently did not mechanise before the outbreak of the Second World War; after mobilisation, it was converted to the artillery role. It transferred into the Royal Artillery in February 1940 as 155th (Lanarkshire Yeomanry) Field Regiment, RA; in April 1940, 156th (Lanarkshire Yeomanry) Field Regiment, RA was formed as a second-line duplicate. Both served as field artillery regiments.

==== 155th (Lanarkshire Yeomanry) Field Regiment, RA ====
The 155th moved to India in May 1941, and joined 9th Indian Division, equipped with 25 pounder guns; in August, it moved to Malaya with the division, leaving one battery behind to form the nucleus of 160th Field Regiment, RA. In September it re-equipped with 4.5" guns, and in October it was transferred into 11th Indian Division. It fought in the Battle of Malaya and the Battle of Singapore; with the surrender of Singapore, it was taken prisoner on 15 February 1942.

==== 156th (Lanarkshire Yeomanry) Field Regiment, RA ====
The 156th moved to North Africa in July 1942, and was attached to 5th Infantry Division in August; it remained with the division through the remainder of the war, fighting in the Invasion of Sicily, the Italian Campaign and in North-Western Europe.

=== Post war ===
After the War, the regiment reconstituted in the Territorial Army as a yeomanry regiment, under its old title of The Lanarkshire Yeomanry, and transferred into the Royal Armoured Corps. In 1956 it amalgamated with the Queen's Own Royal Glasgow Yeomanry and the 1st/2nd Lothians and Border Horse to form The Queen's Own Lowland Yeomanry.

The lineage of the regiment was revived with the formation of B (Lanarkshire and Queen's Own Royal Glasgow Yeomanry) Squadron, the Scottish Yeomanry at East Kilbride in November 1992 but that regiment was disbanded a result of the Strategic Defence Review in July 1999.

== Battle honours ==
The Lanarkshire Yeomanry was awarded the following battle honours (honours in bold are emblazoned on the regimental colours):

Second Boer War	**South Africa 1900–01**	Honorary Distinction from the Second World War, awarded to the Shropshire Yeomanry for service as a Royal Artillery regiment. The Lanarkshire Yeomanry Honorary Distinction was similar.
First World War	**Ypres 1918**, **France and Flanders 1918**, **Gallipoli 1915**, **Egypt 1915–17**, **Gaza**, **Jerusalem**, **Tell 'Asur**, **Palestine 1917–18**	Honorary Distinction from the Second World War, awarded to the Shropshire Yeomanry for service as a Royal Artillery regiment. The Lanarkshire Yeomanry Honorary Distinction was similar.
Second World War	The Royal Artillery was present in nearly all battles and would have earned most of the honours awarded to cavalry and infantry regiments. In 1833, William IV awarded the motto Ubique (meaning "everywhere") in place of all battle honours. Honorary Distinction: Badge of the Royal Regiment of Artillery with year-dates "1941–45" and four scrolls: "North-West Europe", "Sicily", "Italy" and "Malaya".	Honorary Distinction from the Second World War, awarded to the Shropshire Yeomanry for service as a Royal Artillery regiment. The Lanarkshire Yeomanry Honorary Distinction was similar.

== See also ==
- Imperial Yeomanry
- List of Yeomanry Regiments 1908
- Yeomanry
- Yeomanry order of precedence
- British yeomanry during the First World War
- Second line yeomanry regiments of the British Army
- List of British Army Yeomanry Regiments converted to Royal Artillery

== Bibliography ==
- James, Brigadier E.A. (1978). British Regiments 1914–18. London: Samson Books Limited. ISBN 0-906304-03-2.
- Mileham, Patrick (1994). The Yeomanry Regiments; 200 Years of Tradition. Edinburgh: Canongate Academic. ISBN 1-898410-36-4.
- Rinaldi, Richard A (2008). Order of Battle of the British Army 1914. Ravi Rikhye. ISBN 978-0-97760728-0.
