= Wellington Square drill hall, Ayr =

Wellington Square drill hall
- Ayr, Scotland
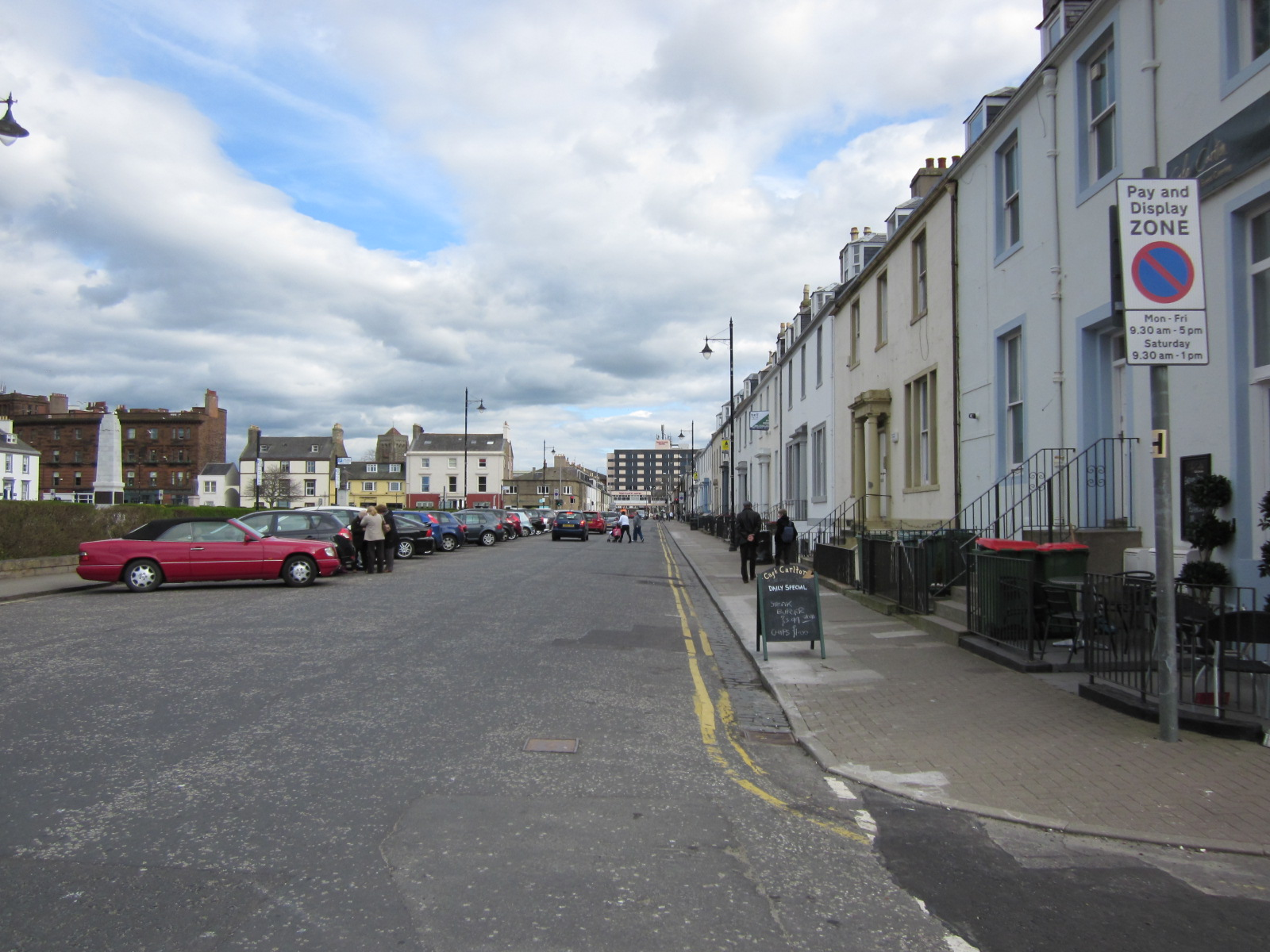
- Wellington Square (No. 16 is on the immediate right)

Site information
- Type: Drill hall

Location
- Location in South Ayrshire
- Coordinates: 55.46091°N 4.63721°W

Site history
- Built: Early 20th century
- Built for: War Office
- In use: Early 20th century – Present

The Wellington Square drill hall was a military installation in Ayr.

== History ==
The building was created by the conversion an early 19th century private house (No. 16 Wellington Square) into the headquarters for the Ayrshire (Earl of Carrick's Own) Yeomanry in the early 20th century. There is evidence of a drill hall and firing range behind No. 24 Wellington Square, further along the street, which may have been used by the regiment for training purposes. The regiment was mobilised at Wellington Square in August 1914 before being deployed to Gallipoli. The property was subsequently converted back to residential use.
