= Lothians and Border Horse =

The Lothians and Border Horse
- Cap Badge of The Lothians and Border Horse
- Active: 1797–1956; 2014–Present
- Country: Kingdom of Great Britain (1797–1800); United Kingdom (1801–1956)
- Branch: British Army
- Type: Yeomanry
- Size: First World War, 3 Regiments; Second World War, 2 Regiments; Current, 1 Squadron
- Part of: The Scottish and North Irish Yeomanry
- Garrison/HQ: Edinburgh
- Nicknames: E (L&BHY) Sqn
- Engagements: Battle of Normandy; Battle of the Scheldt; Geilenkirchen salient Rhine crossing Elbe crossing Bou Arada; Fondouk; El Kourzia; Battle of Tunis; Liri Valley; Arezzo; Advance to Florence; Gothic Line; Argenta Gap

Commanders
- Honorary Colonel: Donald S.F. Young

The Lothians and Border Horse was a Yeomanry regiment, part of the British Territorial Army. It was ranked 36th in the Yeomanry order of precedence and was based in the Scottish Lowland area, recruiting in the Lothians – East Lothian (Haddingtonshire), Midlothian (Edinburghshire), and West Lothian (Linlithgowshire) – and along the border with England, particularly Berwickshire. It amalgamated with the Lanarkshire Yeomanry and the Queen's Own Royal Glasgow Yeomanry to form the Queen's Own Lowland Yeomanry in 1956.

In 2014 following the 2013 Future Army Reserves announcement, the regiment was re-formed within the new Scottish and North Irish Yeomanry.

== History ==
=== Formation and early history ===
Raised in 1797, the East Lothian Yeomanry Cavalry regiment originally comprised three troops, with a fourth Dunbar Troop added in 1803. At the same time a separate Berwickshire Yeomanry was formed. Its first Colonel was Sir James Gardiner Baird of Saughtonhall, Bart. Both the East Lothian and Berwickshire Yeomanry Cavalry were reviewed by King George IV in 1822. The East Lothian Yeomanry was originally recognised as a reserve of the 2nd Life Guards and its uniform was modelled on that worn by the Life Guards at Waterloo. The Duke of Wellington gave special permission for the use of gold lace.

After disbandment in 1838 and re-raising in 1846, the unit became, in 1848, the Lothians and Berwickshire Regiment of Yeomanry Cavalry in 1888.

=== Second Boer War ===
In the Second Boer War, the regiment sponsored the 19th (Lothians and Berwickshire) Company of the Imperial Yeomanry (IY), which served in the 6th (Scottish) Battalion, IY, in South Africa from 1900 until 1902. The regiment became the Lothians and Berwickshire Imperial Yeomanry in 1901. It was based at Dundonald Street in Edinburgh at this time. In 1908, the regiment was transferred to the Territorial Force (TF) and named The Lothians and Border Horse (Dragoons).

A war memorial was erected to the Lothians and Berwickshire Yeomanry in Queens Road, Dunbar commemorating eleven men were lost in the Second Boer War. Panels were later attached to commemorate those who lost their lives in the First World War and the Second World War. It is in the form of a stone obelisk and was erected in 1902. It was listed, category B, in 1998.

=== First World War ===
In accordance with the Territorial and Reserve Forces Act 1907 (7 Edw. 7, c.9) which brought the Territorial Force into being, the TF was intended to be a home defence force for service during wartime and members could not be compelled to serve outside the country. However, on the outbreak of war on 4 August 1914, many members volunteered for Imperial Service. Therefore, TF units were split in August and September 1914 into 1st Line (liable for overseas service) and 2nd Line (home service for those unable or unwilling to serve overseas) units. Later, a 3rd Line was formed to act as a reserve, providing trained replacements for the 1st and 2nd Line regiments.

In August 1914, the Lothians and Border Horse was based in Edinburgh and assigned to the Lowland Mounted Brigade.

==== 1/1st Lothians and Border Horse ====
In the Summer of 1915, the 1/1st was split up as follows:

- Regimental Headquarters and B Squadron joined the 25th Division. In May 1916, it moved to become V Corps Cavalry Regiment (Note: Along with RHQ and A and B Squadrons of Queen's Own Royal Glasgow Yeomanry,) but, in July 1917, due to manpower shortages, it was dismounted and transferred to the infantry. In September 1917, after infantry training, it was redesignated the 17th Battalion Royal Scots.
- A Squadron first went to the 26th Division, then, in November 1916, it joined the 8th Mounted Brigade.
- D Squadron initially joined the 22nd Division. In November 1916, it was reunited with A Squadron in the 8th Mounted Brigade.

On 11 May 1917, A and D Squadrons formed the XII Corps Cavalry Regiment at Salonika, where they remained until the end of the war.

==== 2/1st Lothians and Border Horse ====
The 2nd line regiment was formed in 1914. In 1915, it was under the command of the 2/1st Lowland Mounted Brigade in Scotland (along with the 2/1st Ayrshire (Earl of Carrick's Own) Yeomanry and the 2/1st Lanarkshire Yeomanry) and by March 1916 was at Dunbar in East Lothian. On 31 March 1916, the remaining Mounted Brigades were numbered in a single sequence and the brigade became 20th Mounted Brigade, still at Dunbar under Scottish Command.

In July 1916 there was a major reorganization of 2nd Line yeomanry units in the United Kingdom. All but 12 regiments were converted to cyclists and, as a consequence, the regiment was dismounted and the brigade converted to 13th Cyclist Brigade. Further reorganization in October and November 1916 saw the brigade redesignated as 9th Cyclist Brigade in November, still at Dunbar. The regiment moved to Haddington in July 1917.

About May 1918 the Brigade moved to Ireland and the regiment was stationed at Derry and Enniskillen, County Fermanagh. There were no further changes before the end of the war.

==== 3/1st Lothians and Border Horse ====
The 3rd Line regiment was formed in 1915. That summer, it was affiliated to a Reserve Cavalry Regiment at Aldershot. In June 1916, it was affiliated to the 2nd Reserve Cavalry Regiment, also at Aldershot. Early in 1917, it was absorbed in the 4th Reserve Cavalry Regiment, still at Aldershot.

=== Between the wars ===
On 7 February 1920, the regiment was reconstituted in the Territorial Army with HQ still at Edinburgh. Following the experience of the war, it was decided that only the fourteen most senior yeomanry regiments would be retained as horsed cavalry, with the rest being transferred to other roles. As a result, on 21 May 1920, the regiment was one of eight (Note: The eight yeomanry regiments converted to Armoured Car Companies of the Royal Tank Corps (RTC) were: 19th (Lothians and Border) Armoured Car Company, Royal Tank Corps from Lothians and Border Horse; 20th (Fife and Forfar) Armoured Car Company, Royal Tank Corps from Fife and Forfar Yeomanry; 21st (Gloucestershire Yeomanry) Armoured Car Company, Royal Tank Corps from Royal Gloucestershire Hussars; 22nd (London) Armoured Car Company (Westminster Dragoons), Royal Tank Corps from Westminster Dragoons; 23rd (London) Armoured Car Company, Royal Tank Corps from 3rd County of London Yeomanry (Sharpshooters); 24th (Derbyshire Yeomanry) Armoured Car Company, Royal Tank Corps from Derbyshire Yeomanry; 25th (Northamptonshire Yeomanry) Armoured Car Company, Royal Tank Corps from Northamptonshire Yeomanry; 26th (East Riding of York Yeomanry) Armoured Car Company, Royal Tank Corps from East Riding Yeomanry) converted and reduced to an Armoured Car Company. The company was originally designated 1st (Lothians and Border) Armoured Car Company, Tank Corps. It was later renumbered as 19th (Lothians and Border) Armoured Car Company, Royal Tank Corps. On 30 April 1939, it was transferred to the Royal Armoured Corps.

By 1939, it had become clear that a new European war was likely to break out, and the doubling of the Territorial Army was authorised, with each unit forming a duplicate. The Lothians were expanded into what was officially known as two armoured 'Lines' (aka armoured regiments) on 24 August 1939 as 1st Lothians and Border Yeomanry that came under the 51st Highland Division and a duplicate the 2nd Lothians and Border Horse that came under the 26th Armoured Brigade of the 6th Armoured Division.

=== Second World War ===
==== 1st Lothians and Border Yeomanry ====
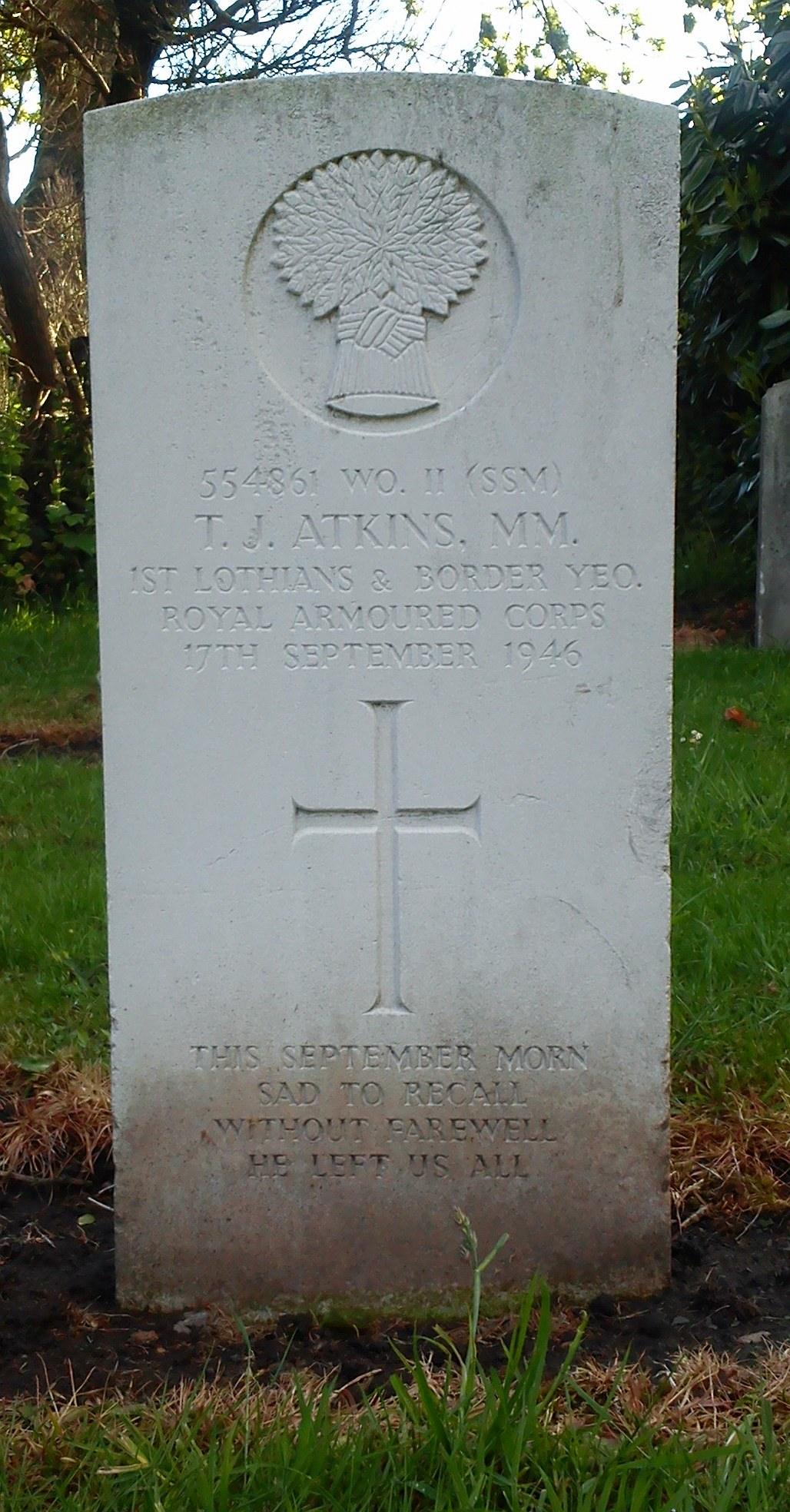
Bromsgrove cemetery, memorial for T.J. Atkins, MM

The 1st Regiment of Lothians and Border Yeomanry was part of the 51st Highland Division, which had been sent to reinforce the French Maginot Line and was serving there when the Germans started their offensive. Together with the rest of the Division, the regiment attempted to rejoin the British Expeditionary Force (BEF). Moving around the south of Paris, the regiment engaged the German Army south of the River Somme near Abbeville. Outnumbered, it fought a retreat of sixty miles in six days to the fishing port of St. Valery-en-Caux, where, having run out of food, ammunition and other supplies, they surrendered on 12 June.

Prior to this, some of the regiment's personnel were evacuated during Operation Aerial, and went on to re-form the 1st Lothians and Border Horse, which was attached to the 30th Armoured Brigade, 79th Armoured Division and returned to France on D Day, 6 June 1944. The regiment remained with 79th Armoured in North West Europe until the end of the war. Casualties, from D-Day up to the end of the war, consisted of 17 men killed, 90 officers and other ranks wounded, and 16 officers and other ranks missing in action. Equipment losses were four Sherman Gun Tanks and 36 Sherman Crab Tanks destroyed.

===== Commanding officers =====
Commanding officers of the 1st Lothians and Border Yeomanry were as follows:

- 2 September 1939: Lieutenant-Colonel Henry Younger, killed in action
- 17 March 1940: Lieutenant-Colonel Michael Picton Ansell, became a prisoner of war

==== 2nd Lothians and Border Horse ====
On 22 August 1939, while Germany prepared to invade Poland, the 2nd Lothians and Border Horse formed. On 17 May 1940, Major Desmond O'Brien Evelyn Ffrench-Blake of the 13/18 Hussars joined Regiment for duties as Second-in-Command. He remained with the regiment, and became the commanding officer in North Africa until his death two years later.

On 30 May 1940, the regiment was assigned to the newly formed 1st Motor Machine Gun Brigade, as an interim move due to the shortage of Tanks after the retreat from Dunkirk.

On 12 September 1940, the regiment was converted from a temporary armoured car/mechanized infantry formation to an armoured formation within the Royal Armoured Corps. The change coincided with the brigade being re-designated as the 26th Armoured Brigade, part of the newly formed 6th Armoured Division. They were issued with Crusader cruiser tanks alongside the Valentine and Matilda infantry tanks. The regiment embarked on troopships for the Tunisian Campaign at the end of 1942, and thereafter served during the Italian campaign until the end of the war.

===== Commanding officers =====
The regiment had the following commanding officers:

- 5 May 1940: Lieutenant-Colonel, Major C.H. Turner (Acting)
- 8 October 1940: Major D.O’B. E. Ffrench Blake (Acting)
- 18 October 1940: Lieutenant-Colonel C.H. Turner
- 31 May 1941: Lieutenant-Colonel D.O’B. E. Ffrench Blake (wounded on 25 April 1943)
- 25 April 1943: Major J.R. Palmer, M.C.
- 28 April 1943: Lieutenant-Colonel R.S.G. Perry (Acting)
- 21 May 1943: Lieutenant-Colonel Ffrench Blake (Died on 26 May 1943, following a motor accident)
- 22 June 1943: Lieutenant-Colonel W. R. Nicholson

===== Battle Honours =====
Battle Honours of the 2nd Regiment Lothians & Border Horse

NORTH AFRICA (Tunisia)

- Jan 1943 Bou Arada
- Feb 1943 Kasserine Pass
- Feb 1943 Thala (south of)
- Mar 1943 Ebba Ksour and Kairouan
- Apr 1943 Fondouk
- Apr 1943 Goubellat Plain (Sidi Khalif, Salt Lake & Mosque Hill)
- May 1943 Hammam Lif
- May 1943 Bou Ficha
- May 1943 Tunis

ITALY

- May 1944 Cassino
- July 1944 Arezzo
- Aug 1944 The River Arno
- Apr 1944 Bondeno
- Apr 1945 The River Po

=== Post-war ===
The regiment amalgamated with the Lanarkshire Yeomanry and the Queen's Own Royal Glasgow Yeomanry to form the Queen's Own Lowland Yeomanry in 1956.

In 2014, a new squadron was formed within the new Scottish and North Irish Yeomanry based in Edinburgh. After forming, the squadron was designated as E (The Lothians and Border Horse) Squadron. The squadron is currently based at Redford Barracks in Edinburgh and roles as the regimental 'command and support squadron'. On 10 July 2014 the squadron was granted the Freedom of East Lothian, marking their relationship with the county. The squadron marched through the town of Dunbar to mark the occasion.

== Uniforms ==
=== Pre First World War ===
Prior to 1914 the Lothians and Border Horse wore a full dress review order consisting of a silver dragoon style helmet with white plume, a scarlet tunic with dark blue facings, and dark blue "overalls" (cavalry breeches) with double scarlet stripes.

=== Second World War ===
On assuming the role of divisional cavalry in 1939, the 1st Lothians lost the privilege of wearing the cloth tank insignia. When the unit went to France in 1940, the only permissible ornamentation on the blouse was the sign of the 48th (T.A.) Division, a blue macaw on a red background. Later, it was decided that collar badges would be worn, at least by warrant officers (WO) and non-commissioned officers (NCOs), during the period that the regiment served with the 51st (Highland) Division.

The reformed 1st Lothians chose the much greener shade of blanco for webbing equipment and collar badges were also issued to all ranks. Sleeve badges made a reappearance, worn on the chevrons (rather than above as in earlier times) by corporals and sergeants as an 'optional' extra. Those WOs who accepted the privilege, wore the gold-wire garb beneath their rank insignia. French-grey cloth shoulder titles, bearing 'LOTHIANS & BORDER YEOMANRY' in yellow lettering further distinguished the unit for a short period after it was reformed. On joining the 79th Armoured Division, these were displaced, as Divisional Orders stipulated that Royal Armoured Corps cloth titles would be worn by all R.A.C. regiments in the division. In late 1944, this order was rescinded and the regimental cloth titles restored.

The 2nd Lothians also adopted the French grey shoulder titles, in this case bearing 'LOTHIANS & BORDER HORSE'; but nothing else, apart from the divisional sign of the 6th Armoured Division, a mailed fist on a black background, was used to embellish the battle-dress blouse. During the period of the unit's service as a mobile machine gun unit, peaked or forage caps were worn by sergeants and above, whilst khaki field service caps were worn by other ranks. Only in the 2nd Lothians was the practice continued of having this traditional colour on the head-band of the peaked or forage cap. A number of officers also wore a French grey field service cap, edged with gold piping on off-duty occasions.

=== Post-war ===
Battledress features show little change from their wartime originals, except that other ranks were now permitted to wear collar and tie on off-duty periods. The practice of wearing regimental sleeve badges with rank insignia adopted by the 1st Lothians corporals and above in the early 1940s was discontinued. Officers' service-dress reverted to the pre-war pattern with box-pleated pockets reappearing on the skirts of the tunic. With the return of peacetime conditions, a No. 1 Dress in dark blue was re-adopted, similar in form to that worn before the war. The officers' version was set-off with a French-grey stand-up collar. By the time of the Coronation in 1953, the features of this No. 1 Dress had altered considerably and illustrated, in the case of other ranks, both the horsed and mechanized eras of the regiment's history. Shoulder-straps were replaced by chains and the twin bands of scarlet separated by piping were restored to the trouser-seams. In the case of officers, the black beret was displaced by a peaked forage cap, similar in appearance to that worn around the start of the 20th century. This had a shiny peak, a head-band faced in scarlet and the seam on the crown was enhanced with piping in the same colour. Overalls were re-introduced, worn over Wellingtons with spurs. The shoulder chains worn by all ranks were backed with scarlet cloth.

== See also ==
- Imperial Yeomanry
- List of Yeomanry Regiments 1908
- Yeomanry
- Yeomanry order of precedence
- British yeomanry during the First World War
- Second line yeomanry regiments of the British Army

== Bibliography ==
- Antonio, D.G. (1947). Driver Advance, a Short Account of the 2nd Lothians and Border Horse 1939-1946. Edinburgh: Constable.
- Bellis, Malcolm A. (1994). Regiments of the British Army 1939–1945 (Armour & Infantry). London: Military Press International. ISBN 0-85420-999-9.
- J.B.M. Frederick, Lineage Book of British Land Forces 1660–1978, Vol I, Wakefield: Microform Academic, 1984, ISBN 1-85117-007-3.
- Gardiner, Andrew S. Sabres to Scout Cars – An Illustrated History of The Lothians and Border Horse.
- James, Brigadier E.A. (1978). British Regiments 1914–18. London: Samson Books Limited. ISBN 0-906304-03-2.
- Mileham, Patrick (1994). The Yeomanry Regiments; 200 Years of Tradition. Edinburgh: Canongate Academic. ISBN 1-898410-36-4.
- Rinaldi, Richard A (2008). Order of Battle of the British Army 1914. Ravi Rikhye. ISBN 978-0-97760728-0.
- Wooloward, W.A. (1946). A Short Account of the 1st Lothians and Border Yeomanry in the Campaigns of 1940 and 1944-45. Edinburgh: Regimental Association.
