= Queen's Own Royal Glasgow Yeomanry =

- Active: 1796–1999
- Country: Kingdom of Great Britain (1796–1800); United Kingdom (1801–1999)
- Branch: British Army
- Type: Yeomanry
- Role: Boer War; Imperial Yeomanry; First World War; Yeomanry; Infantry; Second World War; Royal Artillery; Post War; Royal Armoured Corps
- Size: First World War; Three Regiments; Second World War; Two Regiments; Post War; One Squadron
- Part of: Territorial Force
- Engagements: First World War; Battle of Gallipoli; Second World War; Operation Aerial; Operation Vitality; Operation Infatuate; Operation Blackcock; Operation Torch; Longstop Hill; Battle of Centuripe the Viktor Line (Battle of Termoli); Barbara Line; River Sangro (Gustav Line); Battle of Monte Cassino; Gothic Line battle of Argenta gap

Commanders
- Notable commanders: William Douglas-Hamilton, 12th Duke of Hamilton

The Queen's Own Royal Glasgow Yeomanry was a yeomanry regiment of the British Army that can trace their formation back to 1796. It saw action in the Second Boer War, the First World War and the Second World War. It was amalgamated with the Lanarkshire Yeomanry and the 1st/2nd Lothians and Border Horse to form the Queen's Own Lowland Yeomanry in 1956. Its lineage was revived by B (Lanarkshire and Queen's Own Royal Glasgow Yeomanry) Squadron, the Scottish Yeomanry in 1992 until that unit was disbanded in 1999.

== History ==
=== Formation and early history ===
In 1793, the prime minister, William Pitt the Younger, proposed that the English Counties form a force of Volunteer Yeoman Cavalry that could be called on by the king to defend the country against invasion or by the Lord Lieutenant to subdue any civil disorder within the country. The regiment was first raised in 1796 as " The Glasgow Light Horse". It was subsequently disbanded in 1822 but re-raised as "The Glasgow and Lower Ward of Lanarkshire Yeomanry Cavalry" in 1848. The additional title of "Queen's Own Royal" was conferred by Queen Victoria the following year.

=== Second Boer War ===
On 13 December 1899, the decision to allow volunteer forces serve in the Second Boer War was made. Due to the string of defeats during Black Week, in December 1899, the British government realized they were going to need more troops than just the regular army, thus issuing a Royal Warrant on 24 December 1899. This warrant officially created the Imperial Yeomanry (IY). The Royal Warrant asked standing Yeomanry regiments to provide service companies of approximately 115 men each, equipped as Mounted infantry. In addition to this, many British citizens (usually mid-upper class) volunteered to join the new force.

The first contingent of recruits contained 550 officers, 10,371 men with 20 battalions and 4 companies, which arrived in South Africa between February and April 1900.
The Queen's Own Glasgow Yeomanry provided troops for the 6th (Scottish) Battalion of the Imperial Yeomanry; the companies were:

17th (Ayrshire and Lanarkshire) Company, raised 1900; co-sponsored by Ayrshire Yeomanry Cavalry, and Lanarkshire Yeomanry Cavalry
18th (Queen's Own Royal Glasgow and Lower Ward of Lanark) Company, raised 1900
19th (Lothians and Berwickshire) Company, raised 1900
20th (Fife and Forfar Light Horse) Company, raised 1900; co-sponsored by 1st Fifeshire Light Horse Volunteers, and 1st Forfarshire Light Horse Volunteers
107th (Lanarkshire) Company, raised 1901
108th (Royal Glasgow) Company, raised 1901

The mounted infantry experiment was considered a success and the existing yeomanry regiments were converted to IY, the regiment becoming the Lanarkshire Imperial Yeomanry (Queen's Own Royal Glasgow and Lower Ward of Lanarkshire). The 'Imperial' part of the title was dropped in 1908 when the yeoamnery became part of the Territorial Force (TF). The regiment had its headquarters at the Yorkhill Parade drill hall at this time.

=== First World War ===
In accordance with the Territorial and Reserve Forces Act 1907 (7 Edw. 7, c.9), which brought the Territorial Force into being, the TF was intended to be a home defence force for service during wartime and members could not be compelled to serve outside the country. However, on the outbreak of war on 4 August 1914, many members volunteered for Imperial Service. Therefore, TF units were split in August and September 1914 into 1st Line (liable for overseas service) and 2nd Line (home service for those unable or unwilling to serve overseas) units. Later, a 3rd Line was formed to act as a reserve, providing trained replacements for the 1st and 2nd Line regiments.

==== 1/1st Queen's Own Royal Glasgow Yeomanry ====
On mobilisation, in August 1914, the 1/1st Queen's Own Royal Glasgow Yeomanry was attached to the Lowland Mounted Brigade and moved with it to Cupar, Fife on coastal defence duties. In May 1915, it left the brigade and was split up as divisional cavalry.

- RHQ and C Squadron moved to Egypt in June 1915, landing at Port Said on 22 June. In October, they joined the 52nd (Lowland) Infantry Division at Gallipoli as dismounted troops and participated in the Gallipoli Campaign. In January 1916, they returned to Egypt with the division. In May 1916, RHQ moved to France and joined V Corps Cavalry Regiment. C Squadron remained with the division until August 1917 when it joined XXI Corps Cavalry Regiment, along with A Squadron, Hertfordshire Yeomanry and A Squadron, Duke of Lancaster's Own Yeomanry. In May 1918, it returned to Egypt for the rest of the war. (Note: C Squadron was replaced in XXI Corps Cavalry Regiment by B Squadron, Hertfordshire Yeomanry.)
- A Squadron initially joined 11th (Northern) Division at Aldershot on 2 June 1915 but moved to 24th Division by the end of the month. On 1 September 1915, it landed at Le Havre. The squadron was attached to 2nd Cavalry Division from 30 April to 14 May 1916 and joined V Corps Cavalry Regiment on 21 May.
- B Squadron joined 9th (Scottish) Division in France in May 1915, leaving them a year later in May 1916 for V Corps Cavalry Regiment.

V Corps Cavalry Regiment was assembled in France in May 1916 with the RHQ, A and B Squadrons along with B Squadron, Lothians and Border Horse. In July 1917, the regiment was dismounted and the squadrons were sent to No. 21 Infantry Base Depot at Étaples for infantry training on 23 August. On 29 September, 4 officers and 146 other ranks joined 18th Battalion, Highland Light Infantry in 106th Brigade, 35th Division at Aizecourt-le-Bas which was redesignated as 18th (Royal Glasgow Yeomanry) Battalion, Highland Light Infantry. (Note: The Lothians and Border Horse elements joined 17th Battalion, Royal Scots in 106th Brigade, 35th Division.) The battalion was still in 106th Brigade, 35th Division at the end of the war, west of Grammont, Belgium.

==== 2/1st Queen's Own Royal Glasgow Yeomanry ====
The 2nd Line regiment was formed in Glasgow in 1914. It remained there until May 1915, when it moved to Hawick. In March 1916, the regimental HQ, A and B Squadrons joined the 65th (2nd Lowland) Division in Essex. They were later reduced to a single squadron. In January 1917, they moved to Ireland with 65th Division and in February 1918 were absorbed into the 1st Reserve Cavalry Regiment at The Curragh. In the meantime, C Squadron joined the 64th (2nd Highland) Division in Norfolk in 1916 and was disbanded in 1917.

==== 3/1st Queen's Own Royal Glasgow Yeomanry ====
The 3rd Line regiment was formed in 1915 and in the summer it was affiliated to a Reserve Cavalry Regiment at Aldershot. In June 1916, it was affiliated to the 1st Reserve Cavalry Regiment, also at Aldershot. Early in 1917, it was absorbed in the 4th Reserve Cavalry Regiment, still at Aldershot. As the 1st Line had been converted to infantry, it is probable that some of the men joined the 5th (Reserve) Battalion of the Highland Light Infantry at Catterick.

=== Between the Wars ===
When the Territorial Force reformed as the Territorial Army (TA) in 1920, the 14 senior Yeomanry regiments remained as horsed cavalry regiments (6 forming the 5th and 6th Cavalry Brigades) the remaining Yeomanry regiments were re-roled as Royal Artillery (RA). In 1922, the regiment became 101st (Queen's Own Royal Glasgow Yeomanry) Brigade, Royal Field Artillery, with 401 and 402 Field Batteries at Glasgow. It was an 'Army' field brigade in the 52nd (Lowland) Division area.

In 1938, the regiment was re-roled again, becoming 54th (Queen's Own Royal Glasgow Yeomanry) Anti-Tank Regiment, RA, with 213 (Queen's Own Royal Glasgow Yeomanry), 214 (Queen's Own Royal Glasgow Yeomanry) and 215 (City of Glasgow) Anti-Tank Batteries at Glasgow, and 216 (Clyde) Anti-Tank Battery at Kirkintilloch. The Territorial Army was doubled in size after the Munich Crisis, and the regiment formed a duplicate regiment, 64th (Queen's Own Royal Glasgow Yeomanry) Anti-Tank Regiment, RA, based at Milngavie in Dunbartonshire.

=== Second World War ===
==== 54th (Queen's Own Royal Glasgow Yeomanry) Anti-Tank Regiment, RA ====
Mobilised in 1939 as part of the 52nd (Lowland) Infantry Division, the regiment moved to France as a part of the 'Second B.E.F' in June 1940. After being evacuated from France during Operation Aerial, together with the rest of the division, the regiment trained in mountain warfare at Inveraray in Scotland. Two batteries of the 54th were sent to Normandy about a week after D day. They embarked at Tilbury Docks and landed in France using Mulberry harbours. The regiment saw action during Operation Goodwood and in engagements to the east of Caen. It joined up with the 52 Lowland Division again at Antwerp at the end of September 1944. In August 1944, the regiment became part of the First Allied Airborne Army. (As a mountain formation, it had little heavy equipment and transport, and could therefore operate as an air-transportable formation).

The regiment returned to France in October 1944, and assigned to the First Canadian Army to help open the vital port of Antwerp. The regiment was involved in the Scheldt Estuary of Belgium and the Netherlands, Operation Vitality, Operation Infatuate and the capture of the island of Walcheren to open the mouth of the Scheldt estuary. In January 1945, it participated in Operation Blackcock, the clearing of the Roer Triangle between the rivers Meuse and Roer.

==== 64th (Queen's Own Royal Glasgow Yeomanry) Anti-Tank Regiment, RA ====
Mobilised in September 1939, the regiment remained in the United Kingdom as part of the second-line 15th (Scottish) Infantry Division until July 1942 when the regiment became an integral part of the newly created 78th "Battleaxe" Infantry Division. The 78th was formed specifically for Operation Torch, the Allied invasion of French North Africa, from regular British Army units, landing at Algiers in November 1942. Thereafter, it continued to fight in the Tunisia Campaign, then in the Allied invasion of Sicily, up the length of Italy during the Italian Campaign, before finally arriving in Austria for the end of the war in Europe in May 1945. Units also saw action in Greece, Palestine, and Egypt. Notable engagements include in Tunisia Longstop Hill, in Sicily the Battle of Centuripe and, while fighting in the Italian Campaign, the assaults on the Viktor Line (Battle of Termoli), the Barbara Line and the River Sangro (Gustav Line) as well as the Battle of Monte Cassino, the Gothic Line and the Battle of the Argenta Gap, part of the final Spring 1945 offensive in Italy.

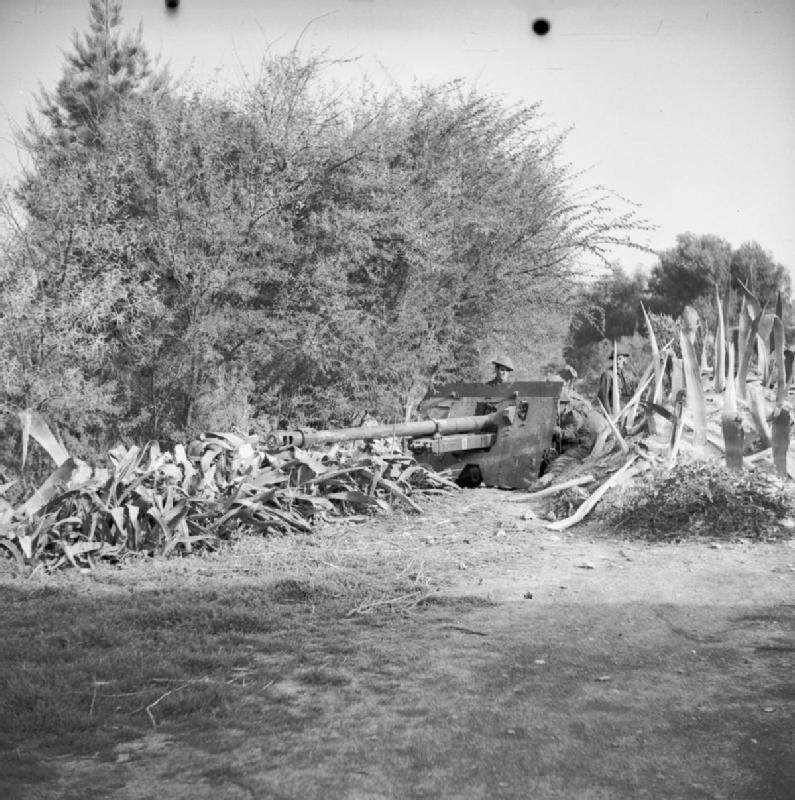
A 17-pdr anti-tank gun of the 64th Anti-Tank Regiment (Queen's Own Royal Glasgow Yeomanry), Tunisia, 20 February 1943.

=== Post war ===
In 1947, 64th Anti-Tank Regiment was disbanded while 54th Anti-Tank Regiment was reconstituted in the Territorial Army as a yeomanry regiment in the Royal Armoured Corps under its old title of the Queen's Own Royal Glasgow Yeomanry. In 1956, it was amalgamated with the Lanarkshire Yeomanry and the 1st/2nd Lothians and Border Horse to form the Queen's Own Lowland Yeomanry.

The lineage of the regiment was revived with the formation of B (Lanarkshire and Queen's Own Royal Glasgow Yeomanry) Squadron, the Scottish Yeomanry at East Kilbride in November 1992 but that regiment was disbanded a result of the Strategic Defence Review in July 1999.

== Battle honours ==
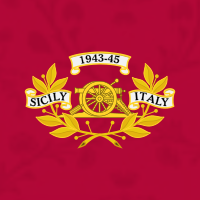
Honorary Distinction awarded to the Shropshire Yeomanry for service as a Royal Artillery regiment. The Queen's Own Royal Glasgow Yeomanry Honorary Distinction would be similar.

The Queen's Own Royal Glasgow Yeomanry was awarded the following battle honours:

Second Boer War

South Africa 1900–01

First World War

Loos, Ypres 1917 '18, Passchendaele, Somme 1918, Bapaume 1918, Ancre 1918, Coutrai, France and Flanders 1915–18

Second World War

The Royal Artillery was present in nearly all battles and would have earned most of the honours awarded to cavalry and infantry regiments. In 1833, William IV awarded the motto Ubique (meaning "everywhere") in place of all battle honours.

Honorary Distinction: Badge of the Royal Regiment of Artillery with year-dates "1940 '42–45" and four scrolls: "North-West Europe", "North Africa", "Sicily" and "Italy"

== Uniform and insignia ==
Prior to 1902, the Regiment wore a dragoon style uniform of dark blue with red facings, which had not altered a great deal since its establishment in 1848. A silver spiked helmet with black plumes was worn by all ranks in full dress. Following the Boer War, khaki was introduced for home service but the full dress uniform described above was retained for wear by officers in review order, with the addition of a gold lace covered shoulder and waist belt, gold cord shoulder knots and gold trouser stripes. Other ranks wore a simpler dark bue uniform with peaked cap, chain shoulder-straps, red collar and trouser stripes for walking out dress.

In 1943, the 64th (QORGY) Anti-Tank Regiment wore a regimental flash on the right arm beneath the divisional sign that consisted of the letters GY embroidered in on a diamond divided vertically in the RA colours of red and blue.

== See also ==
- Imperial Yeomanry
- List of Yeomanry Regiments 1908
- Yeomanry
- Yeomanry order of precedence
- British yeomanry during the First World War
- Second line yeomanry regiments of the British Army
- List of British Army Yeomanry Regiments converted to Royal Artillery

== Bibliography ==
- Gen Sir Martin Farndale, History of the Royal Regiment of Artillery: The Years of Defeat: Europe and North Africa, 1939–1941, Woolwich: Royal Artillery Institution, 1988/London: Brasseys, 1996, ISBN 1-85753-080-2.
- Harris, R.G. (1972). 50 Years of Yeomanry Uniforms. Vol. 1. Muller. ISBN 0-584-10937-7.
- Haswell Miller, A.E. (2009). Vanished Armies: A Record of Military Uniform Observed and Drawn in Various European Countries During the Years 1907 to 1914. Shire Publications. ISBN 978-0-74780-739-1.
- James, Brigadier E.A. (1978). British Regiments 1914–18. London: Samson Books Limited. ISBN 0-906304-03-2.
- Joslen, H. F. (2003) [1960]. Orders of Battle: Second World War, 1939–1945. Uckfield, East Sussex: Naval and Military Press. ISBN 978-1-84342-474-1.
- Norman E.H. Litchfield, The Territorial Artillery 1908–1988 (Their Lineage, Uniforms and Badges), Nottingham: Sherwood Press, 1992, ISBN 0-9508205-2-0.
- Lt-Gen H.G. Martin, The History of the Fifteenth Scottish Division 1939–1945, Edinburgh: Blackwood, 1948/Uckfield: Naval & Military Press, 2014, ISBN 978-1-78331-085-2.
- Mileham, Patrick (1994). The Yeomanry Regiments; 200 Years of Tradition. Edinburgh: Canongate Academic. ISBN 1-898410-36-4.
- Rinaldi, Richard A (2008). Order of Battle of the British Army 1914. Ravi Rikhye. ISBN 978-0-97760728-0.
- Titles and Designations of Formations and Units of the Territorial Army, London: War Office, 7 November 1927 (RA sections also summarised in Litchfield, Appendix IV).
