= Ayrshire (Earl of Carrick's Own) Yeomanry =

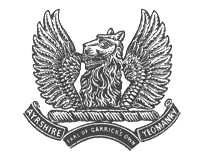
- Badge of The Ayrshire Yeomanry
- Active: 1794–present
- Country: Kingdom of Great Britain (1794–1800); United Kingdom (1801–present)
- Branch: British Army
- Type: Yeomanry
- Role: Light Cavalry
- Size: (current) one squadron (historically) up to three regiments
- Part of: Royal Armoured Corps
- Garrison/HQ: Ayr
- March: Garb of Old Gaul
- Engagements: Second Boer War; First World War Gallipoli 1915 Egypt 1916–17 Palestine 1917–18 France and Flanders 1918 Second World War North Africa 1942–43 Italy 1944–45 North-West Europe 1944–45
- Battle honours: See battle honours below

Commanders
- Honorary Colonel: Major Christopher J.Harrison, TD

Insignia
- Stable Belt Colours (Note: The Queen's Own Yeomanry Stable Belt is now worn by the squadron.)

The Ayrshire (Earl of Carrick's Own) Yeomanry was a Regiment of the British Yeomanry and is now an armoured Squadron of the Scottish and North Irish Yeomanry (SNIY), part of the British Army Reserve. It is the Lowlands of Scotland's only Royal Armoured Corps Unit and has an unbroken history stretching back to the 1790s.

The squadron is part of 51st (Scottish) Brigade within the Army's Support Command. On mobilisation, it provides squadrons to reinforce the regular Light Cavalry regiments. It has provided personnel to both Operation HERRICK in Afghanistan and Operation TELIC in Iraq, who have served with their regular counterparts in the Royal Armoured Corps and other arms and services.

The Ayrshire Yeomanry has won numerous battle honours and one Victoria Cross.

== History ==
=== Formation and early history ===
The Ayrshire (Earl of Carrick's Own) Yeomanry was formed as an independent troop of Fencible Cavalry by The Earl of Cassillis sometime around 1794. It was formally adopted into the Army List in 1798 as The Ayrshire Regiment of Yeomanry Cavalry. The Yeomanry were established and recruited at this time to provide Britain with a defence against any invasion by French forces under Napoleon. The regiment spent its formative years as an aid to the civil powers, reacting to and controlling riots across Ayrshire and beyond, most notably in Paisley.

Following the Cardwell Reforms a mobilisation scheme began to appear in the Army List from December 1875. This assigned Regular and Yeomanry units places in an order of battle of corps, divisions and brigades for the 'Active Army', even though these formations were entirely theoretical, with no staff or services assigned. The Ayrshire Yeomanry were assigned as 'divisional troops' to 1st Division of VIII Corps based at Edinburgh, alongside Regular Army and Militia units of infantry, artillery and engineers. This was never more than a paper organisation, but from April 1893 the Army List showed the Yeomanry regiments grouped into brigades for collective training. They were commanded by the senior regimental commanding officer but they did have a Regular Army Brigade major. The Ayrshire Yeomanry together with the Lanarkshire Yeomanry and Queen's Own Royal Glasgow Yeomanry formed the 11th Yeomanry Brigade. The Yeomanry brigades disappeared from the Army List after the Second Boer War.

In 1897, the regiment was granted permission to use the title Ayrshire Yeomanry Cavalry (Earl of Carrick's Own) in honour of the future King Edward VII, as Earl of Carrick is a subsidiary title of the Princes of Wales deriving from the Ayrshire district of Carrick.

=== Second Boer War ===
The Yeomanry was not intended to serve overseas, but due to the string of defeats during Black Week in December 1899, the British government realized they were going to need more troops than just the regular army. A Royal Warrant was issued on 24 December 1899 to allow volunteer forces to serve in the Second Boer War. The Royal Warrant asked standing Yeomanry regiments to provide service companies of approximately 115 men each for the Imperial Yeomanry. With the Lanarkshire Yeomanry, the regiment co-sponsored the 17th (Ayrshire and Lanarkshire) Company for the 6th (Scottish) Battalion in 1900.

On their return in 1901, the regiment was reorganized as mounted infantry and titled the Ayrshire (Earl of Carrick's Own) Imperial Yeomanry. In 1908, it was transferred into the new Territorial Force, returning to the cavalry role as the Ayrshire (Earl of Carrick's Own) Yeomanry. The regiment was based at Wellington Square in Ayr at this time.

=== First World War ===
In accordance with the Territorial and Reserve Forces Act 1907 (7 Edw. 7, c.9), which brought the Territorial Force into being, the TF was intended to be a home defence force for service during wartime and members could not be compelled to serve outside the country. However, on the outbreak of war on 4 August 1914, many members volunteered for Imperial Service. Therefore, TF units were split in August and September 1914 into 1st Line (liable for overseas service) and 2nd Line (home service for those unable or unwilling to serve overseas) units. Later, a 3rd Line was formed to act as a reserve, providing trained replacements for the 1st and 2nd Line regiments.

==== 1/1st Ayrshire (Earl of Carrick's Own) Yeomanry ====
Thomas Caldwell VC

On the outbreak of the First World War, the regiment was one of the fastest to react to the mobilisation order and received congratulations from Scottish Command, even though there was an initial delay in that the orders came in a code that had not been issued to the regiment! Following mobilisation, the regiment joined the Lowland Mounted Brigade and remained in the United Kingdom, on home defence duties, until 1915. The regiment finally deployed overseas in September of that year, where it took part in the Gallipoli landings, serving as dismounted infantry. The regiment was attached to the 52nd (Lowland) Division in October; it was withdrawn in January 1916 and moved to Egypt. In early 1917, the regiment was amalgamated with the Lanarkshire Yeomanry to form the 12th (Ayr and Lanark Yeomanry) Battalion, Royal Scots Fusiliers in 74th (Yeomanry) Division (The Broken Spurs), seeing service in the Palestine campaign before moving to the Western Front in May 1918. In June it was transferred to 94th (Yeomanry) Brigade in 31st Division and fought with this through the final Hundred Days Offensive. A member of this regiment, Thomas Caldwell, won the Victoria Cross on 31 October 1918 at Oudenaarde in Belgium.

==== 2/1st Ayrshire (Earl of Carrick's Own) Yeomanry ====
The 2nd line regiment was formed in 1914. In 1915, it was under the command of the 2/1st Lowland Mounted Brigade in Scotland (along with the 2/1st Lanarkshire Yeomanry and the 2/1st Lothians and Border Horse) and by March 1916 was at Dunbar, East Lothian. On 31 March 1916, the remaining Mounted Brigades were numbered in a single sequence and the brigade became 20th Mounted Brigade, still at Dunbar under Scottish Command.

In July 1916, there was a major reorganization of 2nd Line yeomanry units in the United Kingdom. All but 12 regiments were converted to cyclists and as a consequence the regiment was dismounted and the brigade converted to 13th Cyclist Brigade. Further reorganization in October and November 1916 saw the brigade redesignated as 9th Cyclist Brigade in November, still at Dunbar.

About May 1918, the brigade moved to Ireland and the regiment was stationed at Omagh, County Tyrone. There were no further changes before the end of the war.

==== 3/1st Ayrshire (Earl of Carrick's Own) Yeomanry ====
The 3rd Line regiment was formed in 1915 and in the summer was affiliated to a Reserve Cavalry Regiment at Aldershot. In June 1916, it left the Reserve Cavalry Regiment and went to Perth. The regiment was disbanded in early 1917 with personnel transferring to the 2nd Line regiment or to the 4th (Reserve) Battalion of the Royal Scots Fusiliers at Catterick.

=== Between the wars ===
Post war, a commission was set up to consider the shape of the Territorial Force (Territorial Army from 1 October 1921). The experience of the First World War made it clear that there was a surplus of cavalry. The commission decided that only the 14 most senior regiments were to be retained as cavalry. As the 7th most senior regiment in the order of precedence, the regiment was retained as horsed cavalry.

=== Second World War ===
Between the First and Second World Wars, the regiment returned to its horsed cavalry training in Scotland. However, at the beginning of Second World War, the Ayrshire Yeomanry was not required as a cavalry or as an armoured regiment. In 1940, the regiment was transferred into the Royal Artillery and duly formed two Regiments of Field Artillery; 151st (Ayrshire Yeomanry) Field Regiment, RA, formed in February, and 152nd (Ayrshire Yeomanry) Field Regiment, RA, formed in April as a second-line duplicate.

==== 151st (Ayrshire Yeomanry) Field Regiment, RA ====
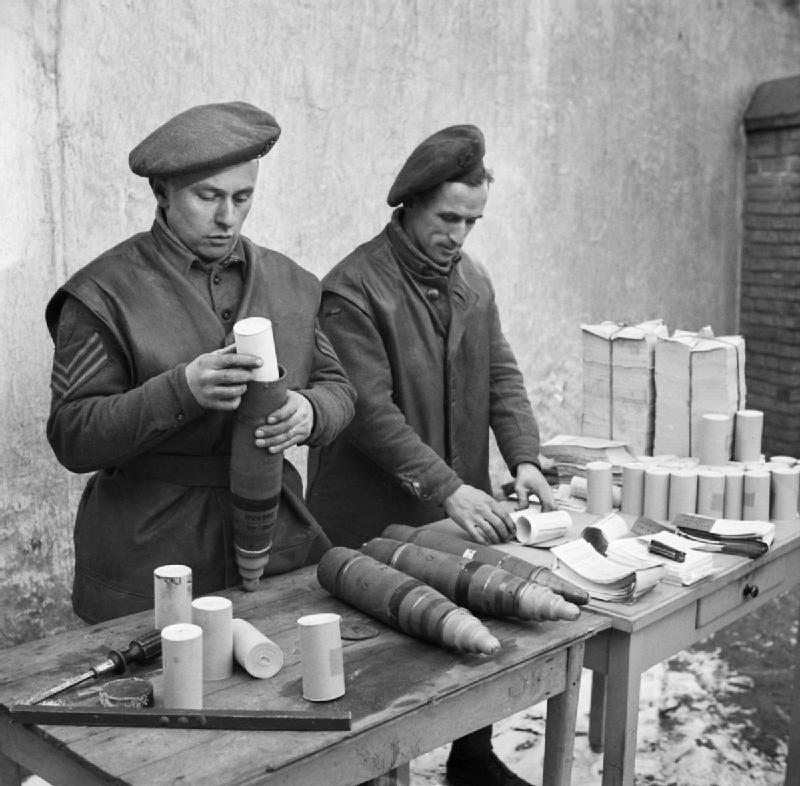
Gunners of 124 Battery, 151st Field Regiment load propaganda leaflets into shells, Holland 24 January 1945 (IWM B 14123)

Initially, the new regiment's activities were focused on conversion training for the new role. Then, in September 1940, the Regiment became officially operational and was assigned home defence duties in Fife and Angus. In November, it came briefly under the command of the 1st Polish Army, which had responsibility for the coastal defence of the area between the Firth of Forth and Montrose. Equipment at this time was a mixture of 4.5" howitzers, 18 pdr guns and US 75mm M1916 guns.

At the end of 1940, the Regiment formally became part of 46th Infantry Division and moved initially to Norfolk, again in the home defence role, while continuing its artillery training. Home defence duties took elements to Kent and other vulnerable parts of the English coastline, while artillery training involved frequent moves to training areas on Salisbury Plain and in Northumberland. By late 1941, the regiment was re-equipped with the 25-pounder gun.

In May 1942, the Regiment was transferred to the 11th Armoured Division. In September 1942, the regiment was mobilised to reinforce the Dieppe Raid, but after the rapid failure of the raid, was not called upon. In February 1943, the Regiment (with the rest of 11 Div) delivered its equipment to the docks and prepared to embark as part of Operation Torch (the Anglo-American invasion of North Africa) but at the last minute the sailing order was cancelled and additional infantry were sent.

Instead, the Regiment remained in the United Kingdom, and trained for the now anticipated invasion of Europe. Sailing from Tilbury on 11th June 1944, the Regiment landed in France at Ouistreham beach and was fully disembarked by 14th June as 11 Div gathered strength in the bridgehead.

The Regiment's first action was in support of the 3rd Canadian Division, at Lantheuil on 14th June, and was then involved throughout Operation Epsom before rejoining 11 Div at the end of the month. The Regiment subsequently participated in Operations Goodwood and Bluecoat which laid the ground for the rapid Allied advance across northern France and into Belgium, in August and September. The Regiment crossed the Seine on 29th August, reached Arras on 1st September and Antwerp on 4th September.

The speed of the Allied advance then slowed, but the Regiment was kept steadily in action, with the emphasis on the removal of the remaining German forces west of the river Maas. In February 1945 the Battle of the Reichswald or Operation Veritable began, with the intention of forcing the enemy to retreat across the Rhine. This saw a period of intense activity for the Regiment with almost constant calls for fire support. 11th Armoured Division was pulled back from the operation in early March, to prepare for the crossing of the Rhine. The bombardment of enemy positions across the Rhine began on 23rd March and continued for three days, with the Regiment firing approximately 1,000 rounds per gun.

The Regiment crossed the Rhine into Germany on 28th March, and reached the Dortmund-Ems canal on 1st April. The advance continued, with at one point the Regiment spread out over a distance of forty miles. On 5th April, the Weser was reached at Stolzenau. The Regiment passed through Lunenburg on 18th April and the following day was in a position to engage targets beyond the Elbe. After supporting the assault across the Elbe on the night of 28th April, the Regiment crossed the river the following day. The Regiment's final rounds of the war were fired on 1st May. With enemy resistance now visibly collapsing, the advance towards the Baltic coast continued, with the Regiment north of Bad Oldesloe on VE Day.

Following the capitulation, the Regiment was stationed in and around the small Baltic port of Eckernforde, where its duties revolved around the re-establishment of civic order and the setting up of the military government. Thousands of Soviet and other prisoners of war required assistance and did large numbers of displaced persons. Additionally, the large numbers of prisoners had to be screened for suspected war criminals. While many members of the Regiment were being posted to other units and equipment was being withdrawn, these responsibilities continued during the remainder of 1945 and until February 1946, when 151st (Ayrshire Yeomanry) Field Regiment Royal Artillery was formally disbanded.

During the campaign in France, Belgium, the Netherlands and Germany, the Regiment lost 40 men killed and 109 were wounded.

==== 152nd (Ayrshire Yeomanry) Field Regiment, RA ====
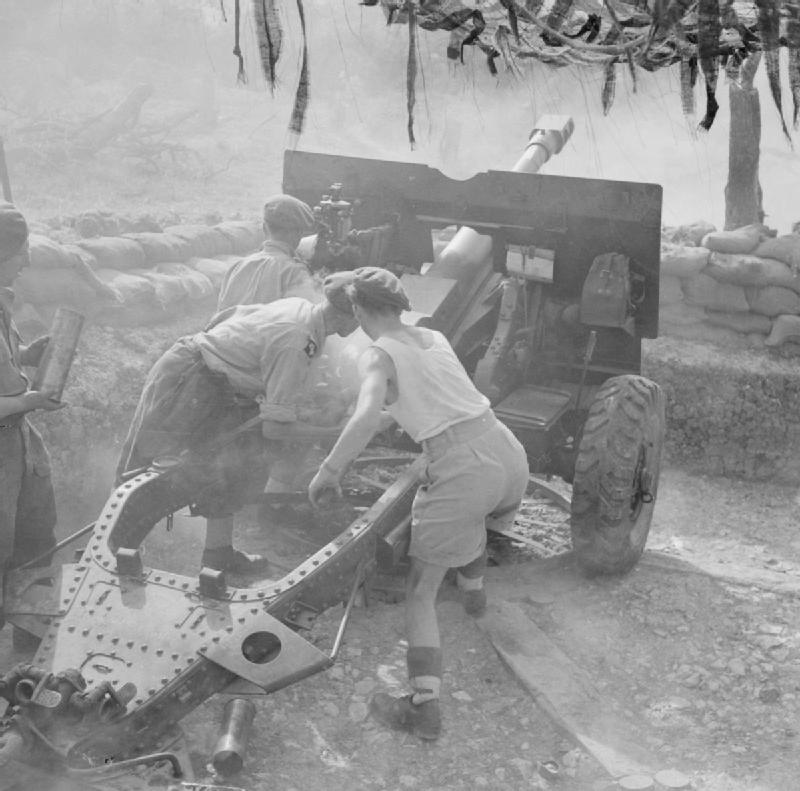
25-pdr of 152nd Field Regiment (Ayrshire Yeomanry) in action during the assault on the Gustav Line, 13 May 1944. Note the new muzzle brake on the gun.

The 152nd was attached to the 6th Armoured Division in mid-1942, and moved with the division to North Africa that November. It remained with the division through the remainder of the war, fighting in the Tunisia Campaign, and the Italian Campaign, ending the war in Austria.

Both Regiments fought with great courage and between them they won four Distinguished Service Orders, twenty one Military Crosses and twenty four Military Medals.

=== Post war ===
After the War, the regiment reconstituted in the Territorial Army as a Yeomanry Regiment, under its old title of The Ayrshire (Earl of Carrick's Own) Yeomanry, and transferred into the Royal Armoured Corps. The regiment was made part of 30 (Lowland) Independent Armoured Brigade. During this time, the regiment were issued with a wide variety of equipment, including at one stage flamethrower tanks. The regiment consisted of Sabre Squadrons at Ayr, Dalry and Kilmarnock with Regimental Headquarters and Carrick Troop (HQ Squadron) in Ayr.

In 1961, the Ayrshire Yeomanry paraded at Culzean Castle and were presented with their First Guidon bearing the Honours which had been hard won. The Ayrshire Yeomanry continued as an independent Regiment until 1969 when, in common with most of the Yeomanry Regiments, it was reduced to a Cadre of just a few men. On 1 April 1971, this cadre gave rise to two new units; B Squadron of the 2nd Armoured Car Regiment, later renamed the Queen's Own Yeomanry, at the former Regimental Headquarters in Ayr and 251 Squadron of 154th (Lowland) Transport Regiment in Irvine with no affiliation to the Ayrshire Yeomanry lineage. In 1992, the squadron was transferred to the newly formed Scottish Yeomanry.

In 1999, following the Government's "Strategic Defence Review", the Scottish Yeomanry amalgamated with the Queen's Own Yeomanry. Two of the Scottish Yeomanry's four Squadrons – The Ayrshire Yeomanry in Ayr, and The Fife and Forfar Yeomanry/Scottish Horse in Cupar continued to operate under command of The Queen's Own Yeomanry. On 1 July 2014, the squadron left The Queens Own Yeomanry to form the Scottish and North Irish Yeomanry. Following the latest defence review, the squadron became 'light cavalry' and uses the Land Rover RWMIK.

== Organisation ==
A (Ayrshire (Earl of Carrick's Own) Yeomanry) Squadron is based at Yeomanry House on Chalmers Road in Ayr.

== Battle honours ==
The Ayrshire Yeomanry was awarded the following battle honours (honours in bold are emblazoned on the regimental guidon):

Second Boer War	**South Africa 1900–02**	Honorary Distinction from the Second World War, awarded to the Shropshire Yeomanry for service as a Royal Artillery regiment. The Ayrshire Yeomanry Honorary Distinction was similar.
First World War	**Ypres 1918**, **France and Flanders 1918**, **Gallipoli 1915**, **Rumani**, **Egypt 1916–17**, **Gaza**, **Jerusalem**, **Tell 'Asur**, **Palestine 1917–18**	Honorary Distinction from the Second World War, awarded to the Shropshire Yeomanry for service as a Royal Artillery regiment. The Ayrshire Yeomanry Honorary Distinction was similar.
Second World War	The Royal Artillery was present in nearly all battles and would have earned most of the honours awarded to cavalry and infantry regiments. In 1833, William IV awarded the motto Ubique (meaning "everywhere") in place of all battle honours. Honorary Distinction: Badge of the Royal Regiment of Artillery with year-dates "1942–45" and three scrolls: "North-West Europe", "North Africa" and "Italy"	Honorary Distinction from the Second World War, awarded to the Shropshire Yeomanry for service as a Royal Artillery regiment. The Ayrshire Yeomanry Honorary Distinction was similar.

=== Guidon ===
The Guidon of the Ayrshire Yeomanry

The guidon of The Ayrshire (Earl of Carrick's Own) Yeomanry was presented by General Sir Horatius Murray KBE CB DSO at Culzean Castle, Ayrshire on 24 June 1961. The battle honours of the regiment emblazoned on both sides of the Guidon are as follows:

SOUTH AFRICA 1900-02	YPRES 1917
FRANCE AND FLANDERS 1918	GALLIPOLI 1915
RUMANI	EGYPT 1916–17
GAZA	JERUSALEM
TELL’ASUR	PALESTINE 1917–18

Placed under the central tie of the Union wreath is the Honorary Distinction: the badge of the Royal Regiment of Artillery within a laurel wreath bearing four scrolls inscribed as follows:

1942-45	NW EUROPE	N AFRICA	ITALY

== Victoria Cross ==
The only member of the regiment to be awarded the Victoria Cross was Thomas Caldwell for his actions on 31 October 1918 at Oudenaarde in Belgium.

== Uniform ==
Prior to 1893, the Ayrshire Yeomanry wore black-leather helmets and black plumes with a dark blue uniform and scarlet facings. This was replaced by a hussar style uniform, including a fur busby with white plume and scarlet bag. Officers' tunics included a unique "figure-of-eight" front gold braiding, while other-ranks wore hip-length stable jackets of dark blue with scarlet collars and cuffs. This elaborate uniform was discarded after the Boer War and at the 1911 Coronation the Ayrshire Yeomanry was one of only two mounted regiments participating to wear plain khaki. The former facing-colours were commemorated by scarlet piping on the breeches.

== Regimental music ==
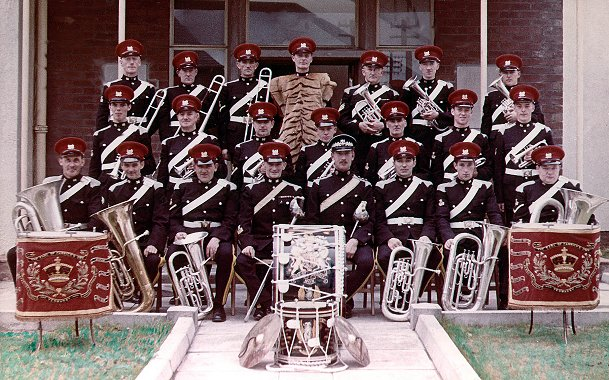
The Band of the Ayrshire Yeomanry in the 1950s

The Ayrshire Yeomanry song, The Proud Trooper, was written as a poem following the regiment's actions in South Africa. The words are believed to have been written by David Mackie, who served with the Yeomanry in South Africa, and were published in his book "Songs of an Ayrshire Yeoman" in 1920. The tune used is similar, but not identical to the Hawick tune "Border Queen" by J Rutherford and James Thomson, and was arranged as a march by the then Bandmaster, WO1 H Brace with Sgt K McConnell and L/Cpl L Martin in 1958.

The lyrics of the first verse of The Proud Trooper are as follows:

"I’ve Listed in The County Horse,
A Yeoman don’t you know,
With spurs of steel upon my heel,
full swagger now I go,
I’ve sworn an oath to serve the Queen,
And to defend Her Throne,
I’m proud to be a Trooper in,
The Earl of Carrick’s Own."

== The Ayrshire Yeomanry Locomotive ==
Of the 842 LMS Stanier Class 5 4-6-0 Locomotives, commonly known as "Black Fives", only four were named, and those were in honour of Scottish Regiments: Lanarkshire Yeomanry, The Queens Edinburgh, Ayrshire Yeomanry, Glasgow Highlander and Glasgow Yeomanry.

== Alliances ==
- British Army – The Royal Scots Dragoon Guards (Carabiniers and Greys)

== See also ==
- Imperial Yeomanry
- List of Yeomanry Regiments 1908
- Yeomanry
- Yeomanry order of precedence
- British yeomanry during the First World War
- Second line yeomanry regiments of the British Army
- List of British Army Yeomanry Regiments converted to Royal Artillery

== Bibliography ==
- Brownlie, Steel W. (1964). The Proud Trooper: The History of the Ayrshire (Earl of Carrick's Own) Yeomanry from its Raising in the Eighteenth Century till 1964. London: Collins.
- Cooper, W.S. (1881). A History of the Ayrshire Yeomanry Cavalry. Edinburgh: David Douglas.
- Frederick, J.B.M. (1984). Lineage Book of British Land Forces 1660–1978. Vol. I. Wakefield: Microform Academic. ISBN 1-85117-007-3..
- James, Brigadier E.A. (1978). British Regiments 1914–18. London: Samson Books. ISBN 0-906304-03-2.
- Knox, B. M. (1946). Brief Historical Notes on Ayrshire Yeomanry (Earl of Carrick's Own) 152nd Field Regiment, Royal Artillery 1939-45. Ayr: Stephen & Pollock.
- Mackie, D. Jr (1920). Songs of an Ayrshire Yeoman. Paisley: Alexander Gardner.
- Mileham, Patrick (1994). The Yeomanry Regiments; 200 Years of Tradition. Edinburgh: Canongate Academic. ISBN 1-898410-36-4.
- Purdie, W. (2019). Never Better Served, The History of the Ayrshire Yeomanry Squadron 1964–2018. Ayr: The Ayrshire Yeomanry Trust.
- Rinaldi, Richard A. (2008). Order of Battle of the British Army 1914. Ravi Rikhye. ISBN 978-0-97760728-0.
- Rowledge, John Westbury Peter; Reed, Brian (1977). The Stanier 4-6-0s of the LMS : (the Jubilees, Class 5s, and the BR Standard Class 5s). David & Charles. ISBN 0-7153-7385-4. OCLC 1256510000.
- Russell, John (2020). Theirs the Strife – The forgotten battles of British Second Army and Armeegruppe Blumentritt, April 1945. Warwick: Helion & Company. ISBN 978-1-914059-39-1.
- Young, I. A. Graham; Gray, R.I. (1947). A Short History of the Ayrshire Yeomanry (Earl of Carrick's Own) 151st Field Regiment, Royal Artillery 1939–1946. Ayr: Ayr Observer.
