= Dundonald Street drill hall =

Converted building in Edinburgh, Scotland

- Edinburgh, Scotland
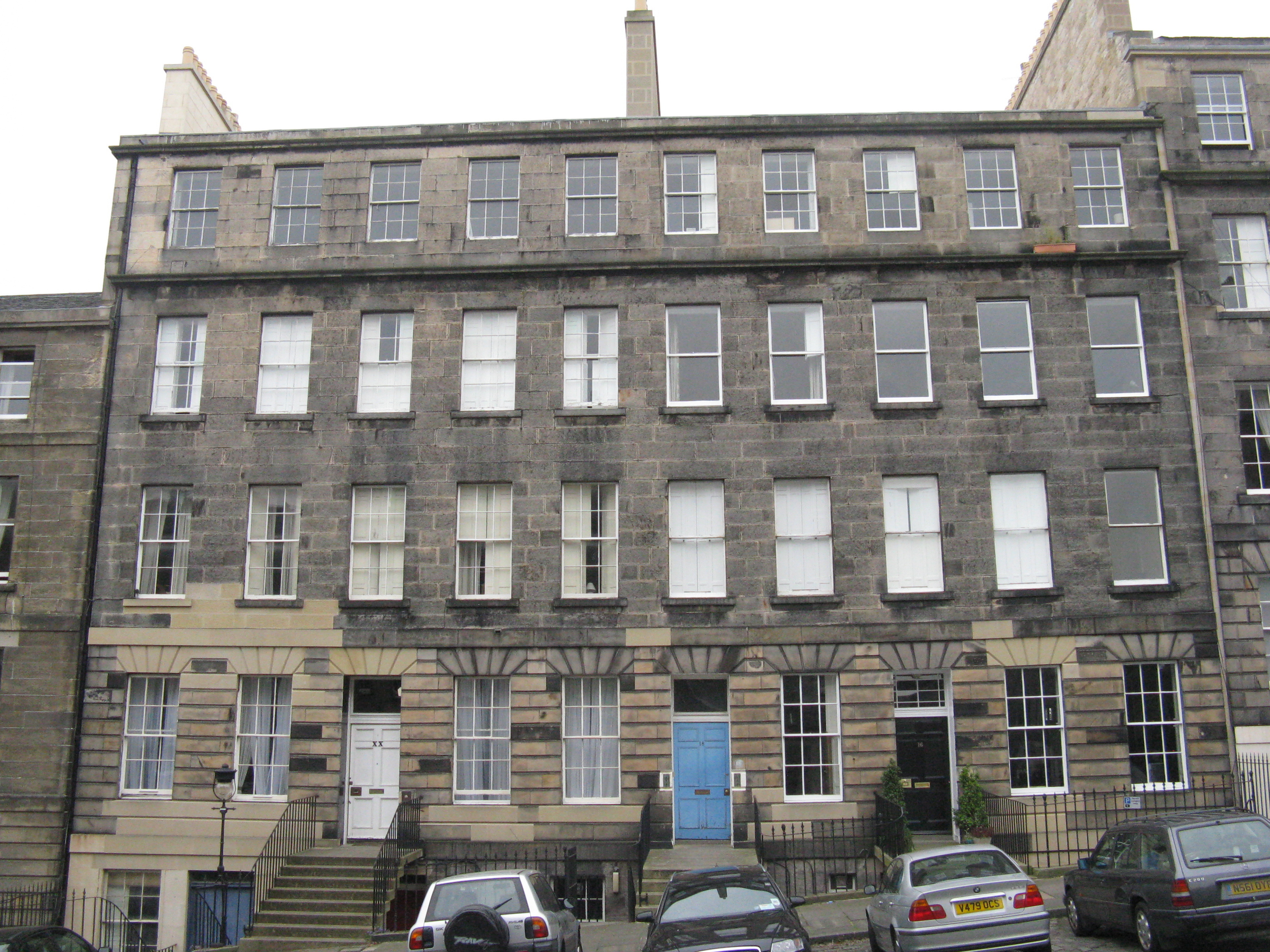
- The terrace in Dundonald Street

Site information
- Type: Drill hall

Location
- Location in Edinburgh
- Coordinates: 55.95945°N 3.19669°W

Site history
- Built: Early 20th century
- Built for: War Office
- In use: Early 20th century – Present

The Dundonald Street drill hall was a military installation in Edinburgh.

== History ==
The building was created by the conversion of a terrace of private houses into the headquarters for the Lothians and Border Horse in the early 20th century. The drill hall itself was located about 130 yards to the north of the headquarters on the opposite side of the road. The regiment was mobilised at the drill hall in August 1914 before being deployed to the Western Front. The drill hall itself was subsequently demolished and the terrace was converted back for residential use.
