= Broomgate drill hall =

Military building in Lanark, Scotland

- Lanark
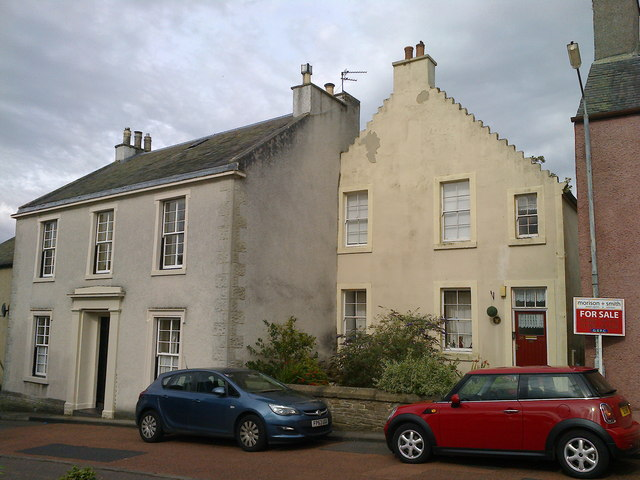
- 40 Broomgate (on the left) and 38 Broomgate (on the right)

Site information
- Type: Drill hall

Location
- Location within Lanarkshire
- Coordinates: 55.67262°N 3.78215°W

Site history
- Built: 17th century
- Built for: War Office
- In use: 17th century – Present

The Broomgate drill hall is a former military installation in Lanark, Scotland.

== History ==
The property comprises two houses, one built in the 17th century and the other built in the 18th century which were combined to form a workhouse in the 19th century. During the first half of the 20th century the property served as the headquarters of the Lanarkshire Yeomanry. (Note: It is unclear when the regiment actually arrived at Broomgate and it may have been after the First World War.) The property was subsequently converted back to residential use.
