= British yeomanry during the First World War =

Part of the British Army reserve Territorial Force

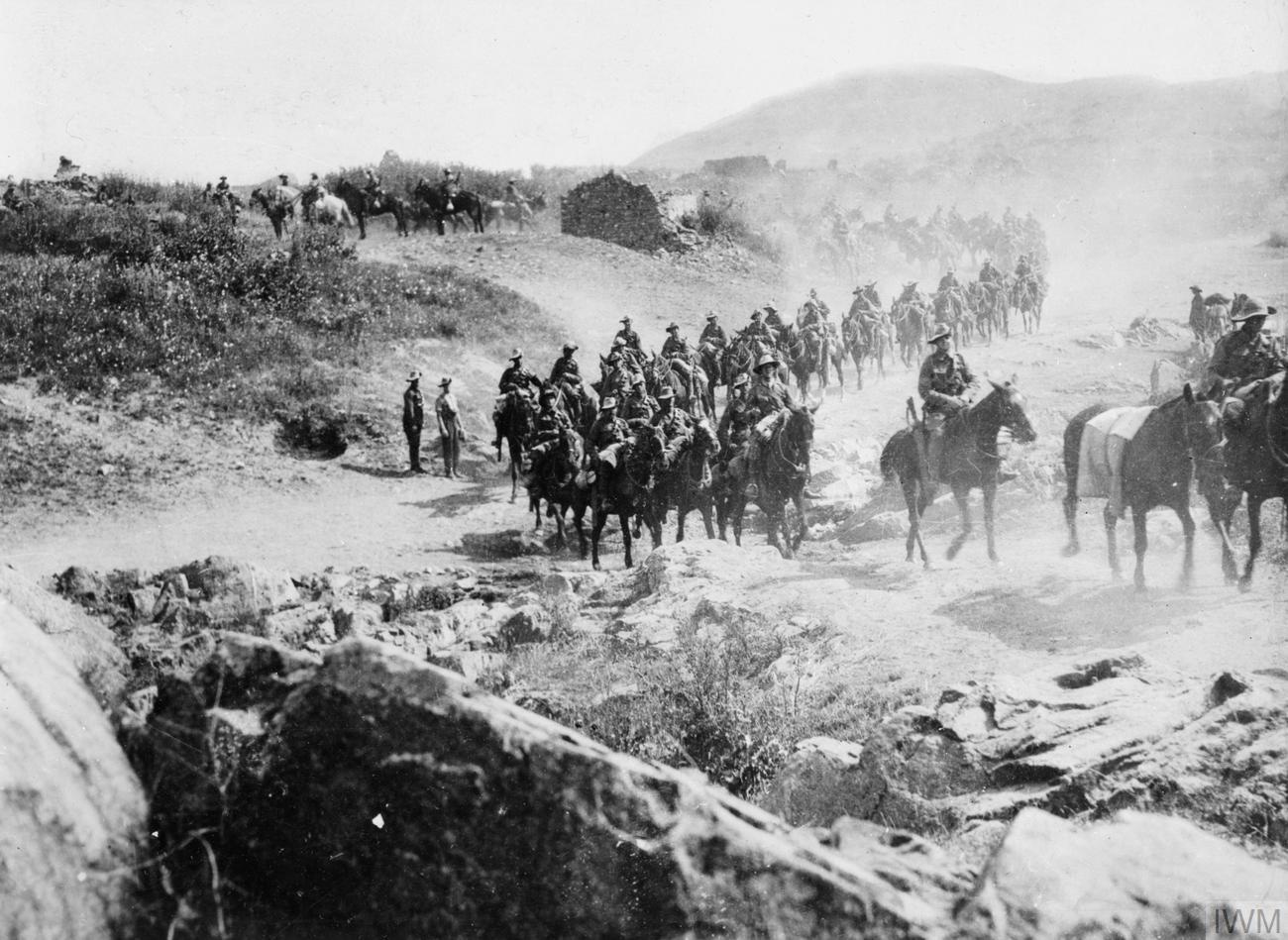
Yeomanry from the 7th Mounted Brigade in the Struma Valley Salonika Summer 1916.

The British yeomanry during the First World War were part of the British Army reserve Territorial Force. Initially, in 1914, there were fifty-seven regiments and fourteen mounted brigades. Soon after the declaration of war, second and third line regiments were formed. However, the third line regiments were soon absorbed into the Cavalry Reserve Regiments, to supply replacements for the cavalry and yeomanry. Other horsed regiments in the British Army, during the war, were the regular cavalry regiments and the three regiments belonging to the special reserve: the North Irish Horse, the South Irish Horse and the King Edward's Horse. The senior yeomanry regiments could trace their origins back over 100 years; the oldest regiment, the Royal Wiltshire Yeomanry, had been formed in 1794. The most junior regiment, the Welsh Horse, had only been formed on 18 August 1914, after the start of the war.

To expand the yeomanry, mirror regiments and brigades were formed. The Yorkshire Hussars part of the Yorkshire Mounted Brigade was numbered the 1/1st when the second regiment was raised, which became the 2/1st Yorkshire Hussars in the 2/1st Yorkshire Mounted Brigade and so on. Mounted brigades were often broken up or renumbered, the aforementioned 2/1st Yorkshire later became the 18th Mounted Brigade. Although there were no yeomanry divisions before the war, after mobilisation, the mounted brigades were allocated to specially formed mounted divisions. Some regiments also served alongside regular cavalry regiments in cavalry brigades. While others were assigned to infantry divisions or army corps as their horsed regiment.

The yeomanry fought in several theatres of war. On the Western Front, they were initially used in their traditional role, but during the campaign in Gallipoli, the 2nd Mounted Division fought dismounted. Later, the yeomanry fought on the Macedonian front where, as part of the British Salonika Army, they were once again employed in the mounted role. Further mounted actions followed with the Egyptian Expeditionary Force in the Sinai and Palestine Campaign. Some yeomanry regiments had a mixed war with several being converted to cyclist units. Others became infantry battalions like the 1/1st Yorkshire Hussars, which ended the war as the 9th (Yorkshire Hussars Yeomanry) Battalion, West Yorkshire Regiment. Several regiments serving in the Middle East were converted to infantry and used to form the 74th (Yeomanry) Division, which then fought on in Palestine before being transferred to France. In 1918, other yeomanry regiments were transferred to the Western Front to form battalions of the Machine Gun Corps. By the end of the war, the yeomanry had suffered over 3,800 dead, which included several senior officers.

== Prelude ==
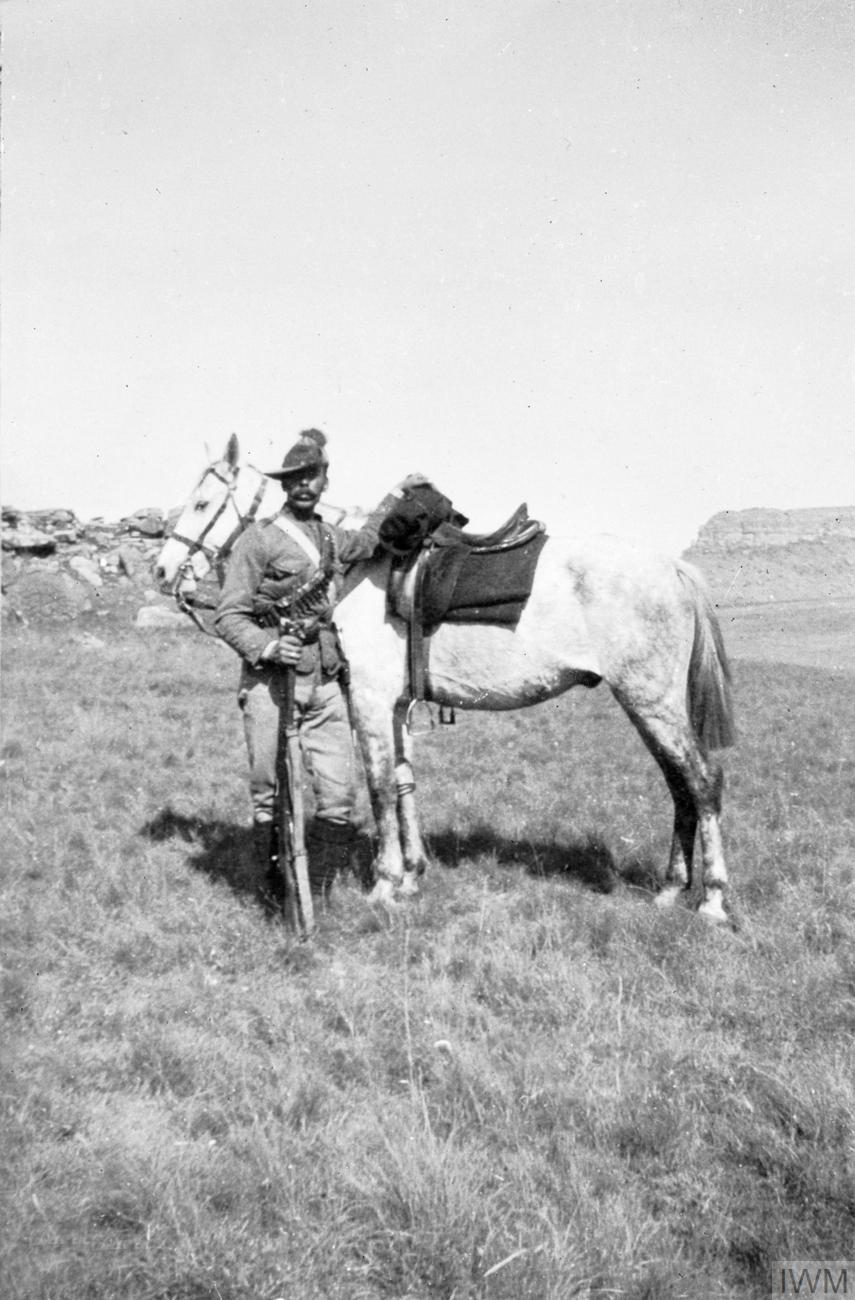
British yeomanry soldier South Africa 1899

The British yeomanry was formed as a home defence force in 1790s. Each yeoman, then mostly farmers or agricultural workers, was expected to supply his own horse and saddle. They were, however, notoriously better known to the population for their involvement in the Peterloo Massacre in 1819 and the Bristol riots in 1831. In the early years, the standard and number of men in a troop or troops in a regiment differed from county to county with no standard formation. By the 1800s, nationally there were only around 1,500 men, but fear of renewed French militarisation saw a large increase in their numbers by the middle of the century. By that time, the yeomanry volunteer had to provide their own weapons and equipment and attend twenty-four days drill a year. However, from 1896, the yeomanry were issued Lee–Metford or Lee–Enfield carbines, which had an effective range of 600 yards (550 m). The Mauser that would be used by their opponents in the Second Boer War had a range in excess of 2,000 yards (1,800 m).

After the start of the Second Boer War, the British Government called for volunteers and in response 10,000 men enlisted in the Imperial Yeomanry. At the time, the strength of the combined yeomanry regiments was around 8,800 and around 2,200 volunteered for the Imperial Yeomanry. Erskine Childrers was a proponent of 'mounted infantry' such as Yeomanry replacing tradition schools of sword-armed cavalry, and wrote a pamphlet decrying the 'German' school of thinking as un-English; He wrote that during the war, it was Yeomanry and the 7,000 colonial mounted contingent, not the 5,000 regular British cavalry, that led the way in tactical development; if only because they had been correctly trained to use the right weapons and tactics for the conflict. (But this is not to slander the Cavalry. They do not stand condemned; their steel weapons stand condemned. ) Since 1880, British cavalrymen had only been armed with carbines and swords, although some also carried a lance. The regular cavalry regiments were considered so unsuitable for the type of conflict that General Sir Redvers Henry Buller, commanding the advance into Northern Natal, left his six regiments of cavalry behind at Ladysmith, trusting in the Yeomanry and irregular mounted forces to carry out patrolling; in the later stages of the war, the regular cavalry were similarly outfitted to the irregulars, with rifle replacing carbine and sword.

After the war, in 1905, the then Secretary of State for War, Richard Haldane started a reorganisation of the army and reserves. The Haldane Reforms and the Territorial and Reserve Forces Act 1907 gave the British Army the capability of forming an expeditionary force. The act also incorporated regular payment for Territorial Force soldiers and training, which included an annual two-week training camp. As a result, when the Territorial Force was formed it was decided there would be fourteen mounted brigades. Each of these brigades consisted of three yeomanry regiments, one artillery battery from the Royal Horse Artillery or the Honourable Artillery Company, an ammunition column, a transport and supply column and a field ambulance.

== Background ==
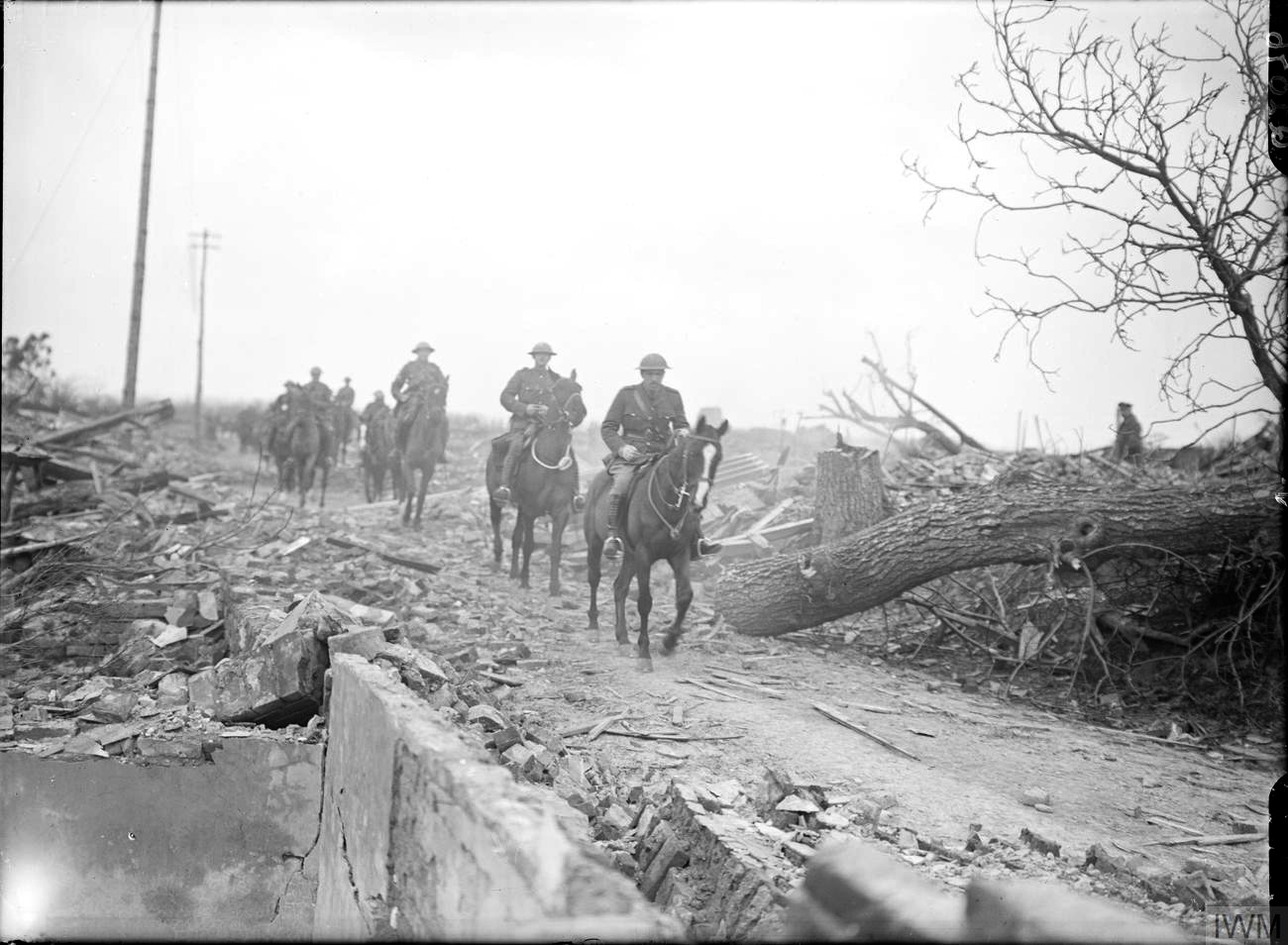
Surrey Yeomanry during the German retreat to the Hindenburg Line.

In August 1914, before the start of the First World War, there were fifty-five yeomanry regiments. Together with the thirty-one regular cavalry regiments and three regiments of horse, which were part of the Special Reserve, these formed the mounted troops of the British Army. However, soon after, the yeomanry was greatly expanded; two new regiments, the Welsh Horse and the 3rd Scottish Horse, were raised and all regiments, old and new, formed second line regiments, raising the total to 114. Twelve regiments were broken up to provide divisional reconnaissance squadrons for infantry divisions on the Western Front. Another five served alongside the regular cavalry in the 1st, 2nd and 3rd Cavalry Divisions in the same theatre. The largest contingent, forty regiments, served in the Middle East, thirty-one of them in a dismounted role during the Gallipoli Campaign. (Note: The 31 dismounted regiments at Gallipoli were: Warwickshire Yeomanry, Nottinghamshire Yeomanry, 1st Scottish Horse, 2nd Scottish Horse, 3rd Scottish Horse, Welsh Horse, Ayrshire Yeomanry, Lanarkshire Yeomanry, South Nottinghamshire Hussars, Royal East Kent Yeomanry, Royal Buckinghamshire Hussars, Derbyshire Yeomanry, Dorsetshire Yeomanry, Royal Gloucestershire Hussars, Hertfordshire Yeomanry, Berkshire Yeomanry, 1st County of London Yeomanry, Royal 1st Devon Yeomanry, Suffolk Yeomanry, Royal North Devon Yeomanry, Worcestershire Yeomanry, Queen's Own West Kent Yeomanry, West Somerset Yeomanry, Fife and Forfar Yeomanry, Norfolk Yeomanry, Sussex Yeomanry, 1st City of London Yeomanry, 2nd County of London Yeomanry, 3rd County of London Yeomanry (Sharpshooters), 1st Lovat Scouts and 2nd Lovat Scouts.) The second line regiments mostly remained in Great Britain as mounted troops until after 1915, when they were eventually transferred to other formations.

=== The regiment ===
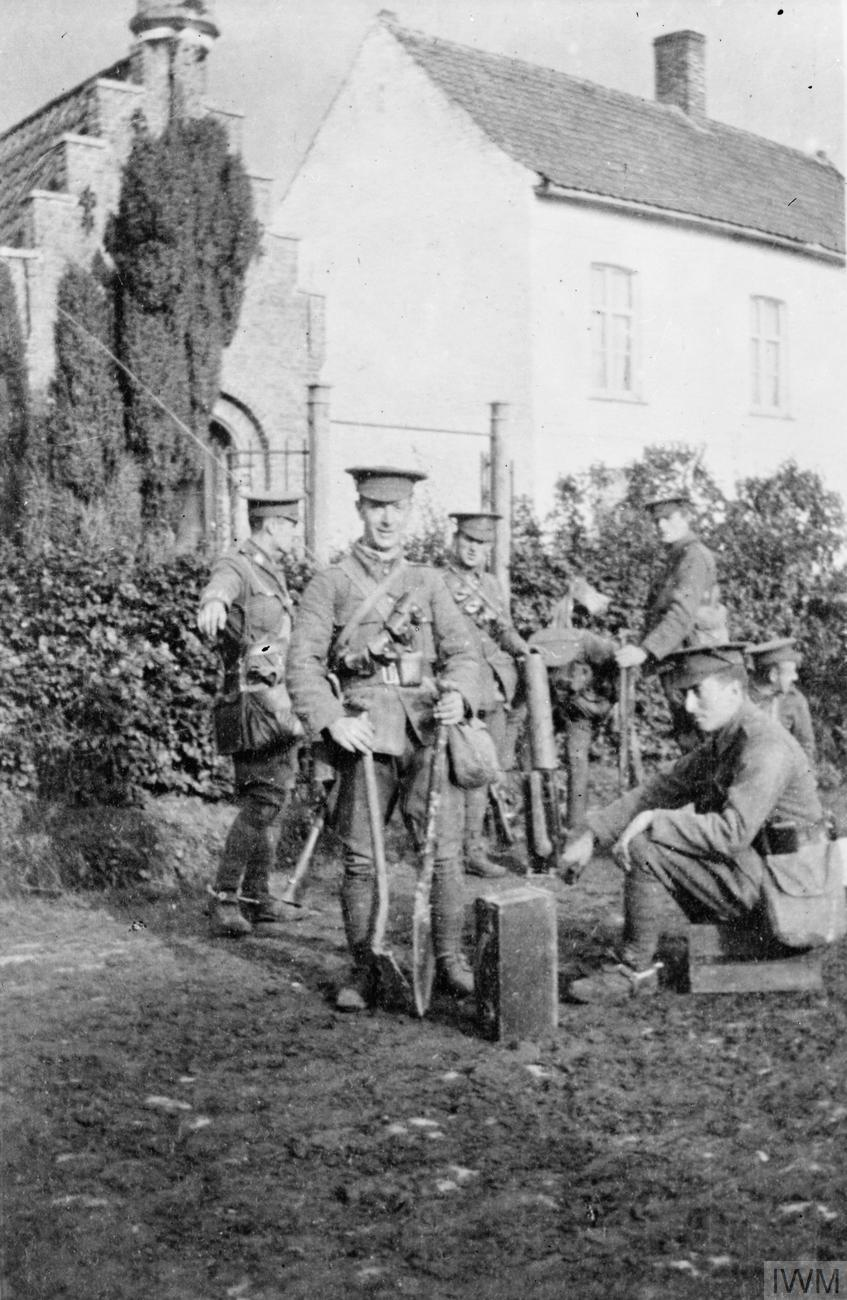
A machine gun section of the Northumberland Hussars on the Ypres-Menin Road, October 1914

The British yeomanry regiment of 1914 was composed of twenty-six officers and 523 other ranks. The commanding officer was a lieutenant colonel, with a major as the second in command; other officers in the headquarters were an adjutant, quartermaster, signals officer, medical officer and a veterinary officer. The other ranks comprised one warrant officer, thirty-seven senior non-commissioned officers, twenty-two artificers, six trumpeters and 457 privates.

Of these men, forty-eight were part of the regimental headquarters and twenty-seven were in the machine gun section armed, which was armed with two Vickers Machine Guns. In 1909, the School of Musketry proposed each regiment should have six machine guns but this was declined for "financial reasons". The remaining 474 men were in the regiment's three squadrons, four troops per squadron. Commanded by a major with a captain as the second in command, a squadron had 158 men; six officers, a Squadron Sergeant Major, a Squadron Quartermaster Sergeant, eight sergeants, two trumpeters, six artificers, and 134 other ranks. While the troop had one officer, two sergeants, one artificer and thirty other ranks.

To look after the regiment's horses, attached to the regimental headquarters was a veterinary officer, a quartermaster sergeant farrier, who was also responsible for killing wounded and sick horses, a saddler sergeant and a saddle-tree maker. Each squadron had two saddlers, one a sergeant, and each troop a shoeing smith. The regiment had 528 riding horses, seventy-four draught horses, six pack horses, eighteen carts or horse-drawn wagons and fifteen bicycles.

British yeomanry were armed with a 1908 pattern sword, and Lee–Enfield rifles, unlike their French and German counterparts, who were only armed with a shorter range carbine. As the war progressed, they were issued with brodie helmets, hand grenades, trench mortars and Hotchkiss light machine guns. Like the infantry, they were dressed in a khaki uniform, with a service dress cap, and instead of infantry webbing, they carried their ammunition in a bandolier. The French cuirassiers, by comparison, would not have looked out of place in the Napoleonic Wars. Still wearing blue and red uniforms, with breast and back metal plates and plumed brass-steel helmets. While the Germans had a standard field grey uniform their uhlans still wore Polish style czapka helmets tunics with plastron fronts, the hussars frogged jackets, and the cuirassiers steel spiked helmets.

=== Yeomanry divisions and brigades ===
On 5 August 1914, the 1st Mounted Division was formed with the Eastern, 1st South Midland, 2nd South Midland and the Nottinghamshire and Derbyshire, and based in the Bury St Edmunds area. On 2 September 1914 the 2nd Mounted Division was formed, initially at Goring, but moved to Norfolk in November, the 1st and 2nd South Midlands, the Nottinghamshire and Derbyshire, and the London Mounted Brigades came under their command. While the 1st Mounted Division assumed command of the Eastern, South Wales, Welsh Border, North Midland Mounted Brigades and the Cyclist Brigade. There was also a 3rd Mounted Division, originally the 2/2nd Mounted Division, and a 4th Mounted Division for the second line brigades.

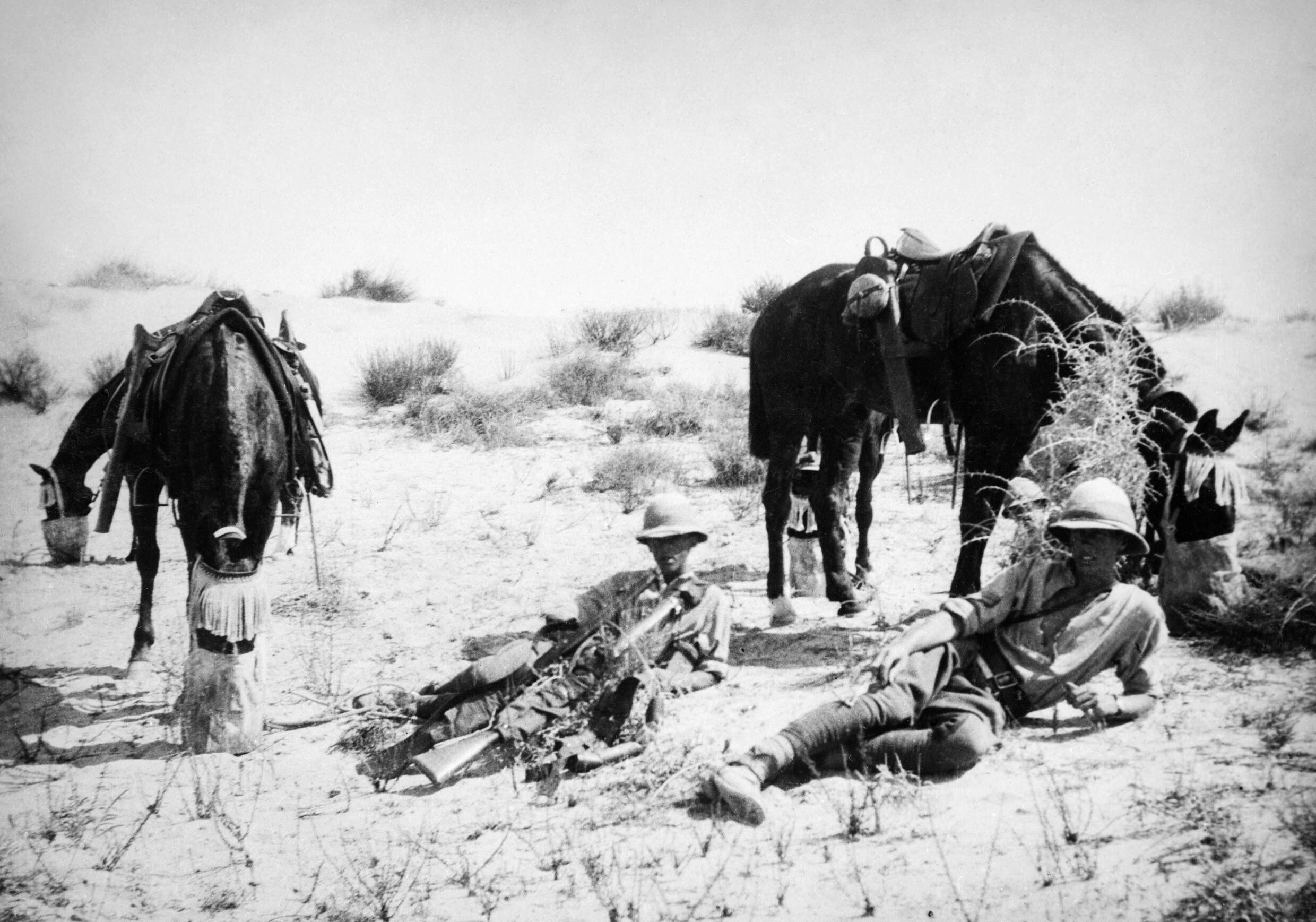
A Yeomanry patrol and their horses during a pause in the desert

The only yeomanry division to see active service was the 2nd Mounted Division now comprising the 1st, 2nd, 3rd, 4th and 5th Mounted Brigades. The division served in the campaign at Gallipoli from August 1915. By September, casualties forced a re-organisation, the survivors formed the 1st and 2nd Composite Mounted Brigades, and the division was reinforced by the Scottish Horse Mounted Brigade and the Highland Mounted Brigade. In the following December, the survivors were withdrawn to Egypt and the division was disbanded in January 1916. The regiments now served in the Sinai and Palestine Campaign and formed several new brigades. The 5th, 6th, 7th, 8th and 22nd Mounted Brigade. These brigades served in the Imperial Mounted Division, the ANZAC Mounted Division, and after a further re-organisation in the 4th and 5th Cavalry Divisions. The brigades in the two cavalry divisions consisted of one yeomanry and two British Indian Army cavalry regiments. The 7th Mounted Brigade also served, as an independent unit, with the British Salonika Army on the Macedonian front.

Other yeomanry regiments that had served at Gallipoli and withdrawn to Egypt, were formed into the 1st, 2nd, 3rd and 4th Dismounted Brigades, and deployed to defend the Suez Canal. Eighteen regiments were then converted to twelve infantry battalions, and assigned to the 74th (Yeomanry) Division in March 1917. The division fought in several engagements in the Sinai before being transferred to France. (Note: The 74th (Yeomanry) Division was composed of: 229th Brigade; 16th (Royal 1st Devon and Royal North Devon Yeomanry) Battalion Devonshire Regiment. 12th (West Somerset Yeomanry) Battalion Somerset Light Infantry. 14th (Fife and Forfar Yeomanry) Battalion Black Watch. 12th (Ayr and Lanark Yeomanry) Battalion Royal Scots Fusiliers.: 230th Brigade; 10th (Royal East Kent and West Kent Yeomanry) Battalion East Kent Regiment. 16th (Sussex Yeomanry) Battalion Royal Sussex Regiment. 15th (Suffolk Yeomanry) Battalion Suffolk Regiment. 12th (Norfolk Yeomanry) Battalion Norfolk Regiment.: 231st Brigade; 10th (Shropshire and Cheshire Yeomanry) Battalion King's Shropshire Light Infantry. 24th (Denbighshire Yeomanry) Battalion Royal Welsh Fusiliers. 25th (Montgomeryshire and Welsh Horse Yeomanry) Battalion Royal Welsh Fusiliers. 24th (Pembroke and Glamorgan Yeomanry) Battalion Welsh Regiment.)

=== Victoria Cross recipients ===
The Victoria Cross is the United Kingdom's highest award for valour in the face of the enemy. Six yeoman were recipients of the award during the First World War.

The first was awarded 21 August 1915, to Private Fred Potts of the Berkshire Yeomanry, during the Battle of Scimitar Hill part of the Gallipoli Campaign. Lance-Corporal Harold Sandford Mugford of the Essex Yeomanry attached to the 8th Squadron, Machine Gun Corps was the second recipient 11 April 1917 during the Battle of Arras. Major Alexander Malins Lafone of the Duke of Cambridge's Hussars for his actions on 27 October 1917 in the Battle of El Buggar Ridge. In 1918, there were three awards, first to Private Harold Whitfield, 10th (Shropshire and Cheshire Yeomanry) Battalion, King's Shropshire Light Infantry 10 March 1918 during the Battle of Tell 'Asur in Palestine. A posthumous award to Acting Lieutenant-Colonel Oliver Cyril Spencer Watson also of the Duke of Cambridge's Hussars, while commanding the 2nd/5th Battalion, Kings Own Yorkshire Light Infantry on 28 March at Rossignol Wood during the German spring offensive in France. The last award was on 31 October 1918 to Sergeant Thomas Caldwell of the 12th (Ayr and Lanark Yeomanry) Battalion, Royal Scots Fusiliers at Audenarde France during the Hundred Days Offensive.

== Aftermath ==
=== Casualties ===
The British yeomanry did not have the same huge casualty lists, common among the infantry regiments. The Queen's Own Worcestershire Hussars with 215 had the highest total dead, while the 1st County of London Yeomanry (Middlesex, Duke of Cambridge's Hussars) only had eight dead. The greatest loss on one day was ninety-three from the Leicestershire Yeomanry on 13 May 1915, during the Second Battle of Ypres. Out of the fifty-four regiments, three had over 200 dead, ten of them over 100 dead, sixteen had fifty or more dead and the remainder less than fifty dead. According to the Commonwealth War Graves Commission the yeomanry regiments total dead during the First World War was 3,867 men, (Note: The full list of dead is; Royal Wiltshire Yeomanry 34, Warwickshire Yeomanry 108, Yorkshire Hussars 46, Staffordshire Yeomanry 91, Nottinghamshire Yeomanry (Sherwood Rangers) 79, Staffordshire Yeomanry 91, Shropshire Yeomanry 43, Ayrshire Yeomanry 43, Cheshire Yeomanry 19, Yorkshire Dragoons Yeomanry (Queen's Own) 41, Leicestershire Yeomanry 158, North Somerset Yeomanry 119, Duke of Lancaster's Own Yeomanry 39, Lanarkshire Yeomanry 57, Northumberland Hussars 75, South Nottinghamshire Hussars 123, Denbighshire Yeomanry 15, Westmorland and Cumberland Yeomanry 45, Pembroke Yeomanry 35, Royal East Kent Yeomanry 32, Hampshire Yeomanry (Carabiniers) 20, Royal Buckinghamshire Hussars 130, Derbyshire Yeomanry 106, Dorset Yeomanry (Queen's Own) 206, Royal Gloucestershire Hussars 146, Hertfordshire Yeomanry 73, Berkshire Yeomanry 143, 1st County of London Yeomanry (Middlesex, Duke of Cambridge's Hussars) 8, Royal 1st Devon Yeomanry 28, Suffolk Yeomanry 39, Royal North Devon Yeomanry 50, Queen's Own Worcestershire Hussars 215, West Kent Yeomanry (Queen's Own) 37, West Somerset Yeomanry 45, Queen's Own Oxfordshire Hussars 161, Montgomeryshire Yeomanry 31, Lothians and Border Horse 52, Glasgow Yeomanry (Queen's Own Royal) 35, Lancashire Hussars 37, Surrey Yeomanry (Queen Mary's Regiment) 52, Fife and Forfar Yeomanry 51, Norfolk Yeomanry 50, Sussex Yeomanry 50, Glamorgan Yeomanry 22, Lincolnshire Yeomanry 97, City of London Yeomanry (Rough Riders) 110, 2nd County of London Yeomanry (Westminster Dragoons) 34, 3rd County of London Yeomanry (Sharpshooters) 62, Bedfordshire Yeomanry 65, Essex Yeomanry 152, Northamptonshire Yeomanry 70, East Riding Yeomanry 67, Lovat Scouts 108, Scottish Horse 203, Welsh Horse 32.) among that total was Brigadier-General Wight-Boycott of the Warwickshire Yeomanry, and nineteen lieutenant-colonels some while serving with other units. (Note: Two from the Staffordshire Yeomanry, the Royal North Devon Yeomanry, and the Essex Yeomanry, and one each from the; Yorkshire Hussars, Nottinghamshire Yeomanry, Shropshire Yeomanry, Leicestershire Yeomanry, North Somerset Yeomanry attached to the 6th Leicester Regiment, Pembroke Yeomanry, Derbyshire Yeomanry, Hertfordshire Yeomanry, Royal 1st Devon Yeomanry, Queen's Own Worcestershire Hussars, Queen's Own Oxfordshire Hussars commanding the 8th Somerset Light Infantry, Glasgow Yeomanry (Queen's Own Royal) attached to the 53rd Australian Infantry, A.I.F., and the Scottish Horse.)

=== Conversion to artillery ===
Queen's Own Yeomanry Guidon with Guard of Honour

After the war, the British Government decided to reduce the number of yeomanry regiments down from the pre-war total of fifty-five. The fourteen senior regiments would remain as yeomanry cavalry while the majority of the remainder were converted to artillery, joining the Royal Artillery.

The 1st County of London Yeomanry (Duke of Cambridge's Hussars), were at the time uniquely converted to a signals regiment in the newly formed Royal Corps of Signals.

=== Yeomanry today ===
The yeomanry is still represented in the Army Reserve of the British Army of the 21st Century. The largest contingent is still associated with the successors to the cavalry, the Royal Armoured Corps, with four regiments, each made up of several squadrons representing an old yeomanry regiment. They are the Royal Yeomanry, the Royal Wessex Yeomanry, the Queen's Own Yeomanry and the Scottish and North Irish Yeomanry.

Other Yeomanry sub-units serve in other corps. The Royal Signals have the 71st (City of London) Yeomanry Signal Regiment (Volunteers), as well as four independent Yeomanry squadrons. The Royal Artillery have 106 (Yeomanry) Regiment, and the Army Air Corps has No. 677 (Suffolk and Norfolk Yeomanry) Squadron AAC. The Royal Logistic Corps also has four squadrons which are affiliated to Yeomanry regiments.

== Territorial Force mounted brigades ==
When the Territorial Force was formed, there were only fourteen mounted brigades, those regiments that were not part of the pre-war organisation were now attached to brigades (marked ** below). At the same time, a fifteenth brigade was raised in Scotland. Another brigade was formed in Egypt in January 1915; it served dismounted in Gallipoli with the 2nd Mounted Division before being broken up in Egypt in March 1916.

Brigade	Regiment	Artillery
Eastern Mounted Brigade	Suffolk Yeomanry (Duke of York's Own Loyal Suffolk Hussars) (Note: Became the 15th (Suffolk Yeomanry) Battalion, Suffolk Regiment in the 74th (Yeomanry) Division.); Norfolk Yeomanry (Note: Became the 12th (Norfolk Yeomanry) Battalion, Norfolk Regiment in the 74th (Yeomanry) Division.); Essex Yeomanry (Note: Left December 1914, for 8th Cavalry Brigade. Then in April 1918, was split up with its men used as cavalry reinforcements.); **Bedfordshire Yeomanry (Note: Attached after war declared, then joined the 9th Cavalry Brigade. Then in 1918, was split up with one squadron each going to the 8th Hussars, 15th Hussars and the 19th Hussars.); **Hertfordshire Yeomanry (Note: Attached after war declared, left for Egypt September 1914. Regiment split up with squadrons in France, Egypt and Mesopotamia.); **Northamptonshire Yeomanry (Note: Attached after war declared, then joined the 8th Division. Then became a corps cavalry regiment.)	Essex Royal Horse Artillery
South Eastern Mounted Brigade	Royal East Kent Yeomanry (Note: Became the 10th Battalion, Buffs (Royal East Kent Regiment) in the 74th (Yeomanry) Division.); Queen's Own West Kent Yeomanry (Note: Became the 10th Battalion, Buffs (Royal East Kent Regiment) in the 74th (Yeomanry) Division.); Sussex Yeomanry (Note: Became the 16th (Sussex Yeomanry) Battalion, Royal Sussex Regiment in the 74th (Yeomanry) Division.); **Surrey Yeomanry (Note: Attached after war declared, then split up among the 27th, 28th and 29th Divisions. Then in September 1917 became part of the 10th (Service) Battalion, Queen's Royal Regiment.)	B Battery, Honourable Artillery Company
London Mounted Brigade	1st City of London Yeomanry (Note: Became E or 103rd Battalion, Machine Gun Corps in April 1918.); 1st County of London Yeomanry (Middlesex, Duke of Cambridge's Hussars) (Note: Finished the war in the 4th Cavalry Division.); 3rd County of London Yeomanry (Sharpshooters) (Note: Became E or 103rd Battalion, Machine Gun Corps in April 1918.); **2nd County of London Yeomanry (Note: Attached after war declared, left for Egypt September 1914. Became F or 104th Battalion, Machine Gun Corps in April 1918.)	A Battery, Honourable Artillery Company
Yorkshire Mounted Brigade	Yorkshire Hussars (Note: Became the 9th (Yorkshire Hussars) Battalion, West Yorkshire Regiment in November 1917.); Queen's Own Yorkshire Dragoons (Note: Became a divisional and corps cavalry regiment, then in December 1917, joined the 8th (Lucknow) Cavalry Brigade in the 4th Cavalry Division. In February 1918 converted into a cyclist unit.); East Riding of Yorkshire Yeomanry (Note: Became D or 102nd Battalion, Machine Gun Corps in April 1918.); **Northumberland Hussars (Note: Attached after war declared, then joined 7th Division. Remained in France as a corps cavalry regiment.)	West Riding Royal Horse Artillery
1st South Western Mounted Brigade	Royal Wiltshire Yeomanry (Prince of Wales's Own Royal Regiment) (Note: Became the 6th (Wiltshire Yeomanry) Battalion, Wiltshire Regiment in September 1917.); North Somerset Yeomanry (Note: Left November 1914, joined 6th Cavalry Brigade, until April 1918 when it was disbanded with its men used to reinforce the other regiments in the brigade.); Hampshire Yeomanry (Note: Moved to France March 1916 as divisional and corps cavalry regiment. Then in September 1917 absorbed into the 15th Battalion, Hampshire Regiment.); Queen's Own Dorset Yeomanry (Note: Left September 1914, for 2nd South Midland Mounted Brigade, finished the war in the 4th Cavalry Division.)	Hampshire Royal Horse Artillery
2nd South Western Mounted Brigade	Royal North Devon Yeomanry (Note: Became the 16th (Royal 1st Devon and North Devon Yeomanry) Battalion, Devonshire Regiment in the 74th (Yeomanry) Division.); Royal 1st Devon Yeomanry (Note: Became the 16th (Royal 1st Devon and North Devon Yeomanry) Battalion, Devonshire Regiment in the 74th (Yeomanry) Division.); West Somerset Yeomanry (Note: Became the 12th (West Somerset Yeomanry) Battalion, Somerset Light Infantry in the 74th (Yeomanry) Division.)	Somerset Royal Horse Artillery
Welsh Border Mounted Brigade	Shropshire Yeomanry (Note: Became the 10th (Shropshire and Cheshire Yeomanry) Battalion, King's Shropshire Light Infantry in the 74th (Yeomanry) Division.); Cheshire Yeomanry (Note: Became the 10th (Shropshire and Cheshire Yeomanry) Battalion, King's Shropshire Light Infantry in the 74th (Yeomanry) Division.); Denbighshire Hussars (Note: Became the 24th (Denbighshire Yeomanry) Battalion, Royal Welsh Fusiliers in the 74th (Yeomanry) Division.); **Westmorland and Cumberland Yeomanry (Note: Attached after war declared. Moved to France as divisional and corps cavalry, then in September 1917, converted to the 7th (Westmorland and Cumberland Yeomanry) Battalion, Border Regiment.); **Duke of Lancaster's Own Yeomanry (Note: Attached after war declared, then in September 1917, became the 12th (Duke of Lancaster's Own Yeomanry) Battalion, Manchester Regiment.); **Lancashire Hussars (Note: Attached after war declared, then joined the West Lancashire Division. Then in September 1917, became the 18th (Lancashire Hussars Yeomanry) Battalion, King's (Liverpool) Regiment.)	Shropshire Royal Horse Artillery
South Wales Mounted Brigade	Pembroke Yeomanry (Note: Became the 24th (Pembroke and Glamorgan Yeomanry) Battalion, Welsh Regiment in the 74th (Yeomanry) Division.); Montgomeryshire Yeomanry (Note: Became the 25th (Montgomery and Welsh Horse Yeomanry) Battalion, Royal Welsh Fusiliers in the 74th (Yeomanry) Division.); Glamorgan Yeomanry (Note: Became the 24th (Pembroke and Glamorgan Yeomanry) Battalion, Welsh Regiment in the 74th (Yeomanry) Division.)	Glamorganshire Royal Horse Artillery
Nottinghamshire and Derbyshire Mounted Brigade	Nottinghamshire Yeomanry (Note: Finished the war in the 5th Cavalry Division.); South Nottinghamshire Hussars (Note: Became B or 100th Battalion, Machine Gun Corps in April 1918.); Derbyshire Yeomanry (Note: Part of 7th Mounted Brigade in Salonika, remained behind when brigade returned to Egypt.)	Nottinghamshire Royal Horse Artillery
North Midland Mounted Brigade	Staffordshire Yeomanry (Note: Finished the war in the 4th Cavalry Division.); Leicestershire Yeomanry (Note: Left November 1914, for 7th Cavalry Brigade. Then disbanded April 1918 with one squadron going to the 4th Hussars, 5th Lancers and the 16th Lancers.); Lincolnshire Yeomanry (Note: Became D or 102nd Battalion, Machine Gun Corps in April 1918.); **Welsh Horse (Note: Became the 25th (Montgomery and Welsh Horse Yeomanry) Battalion, Royal Welsh Fusiliers in the 74th (Yeomanry) Division.)	Leicestershire Royal Horse Artillery
Highland Mounted Brigade	Fife and Forfar Yeomanry (Note: Became the 14th (Fife and Forfar Yeomanry) Battalion, Black Watch in the 74th (Yeomanry) Division.); 1st Lovat Scouts (Note: Became the 10th (Lovat's Scouts) Battalion, Cameron Highlanders in September 1916.); 2nd Lovat Scouts (Note: Became the 10th (Lovat's Scouts) Battalion, Cameron Highlanders in September 1916.)	Inverness-shire Royal Horse Artillery
Lowland Mounted Brigade	Ayrshire (Earl of Carrick's Own) Yeomanry (Note: Became 12th (Ayr and Lanark Yeomanry) Battalion, Royal Scots in the 74th (Yeomanry) Division.); Lanarkshire Yeomanry (Note: Became 12th (Ayr and Lanark Yeomanry) Battalion, Royal Scots in the 74th (Yeomanry) Division.); Lothians and Border Horse (Note: Became a divisional and corps cavalry regiment.); **Queen's Own Royal Glasgow Yeomanry (Note: Attached after war declared. Then in September 1917 became the 18th Battalion, Highland Light Infantry.)	Ayrshire Royal Horse Artillery
1st South Midland Mounted Brigade	Warwickshire Yeomanry (Note: Became B or 100th Battalion, Machine Gun Corps in April 1918.); Royal Gloucestershire Hussars (Note: Finished the war in the 5th Cavalry Division.); Queen's Own Worcestershire Hussars (Note: Served in the Imperial Mounted Division, the Australian Mounted Division and then became XX Corps Cavalry Regiment.)	Warwickshire Royal Horse Artillery
2nd South Midland Mounted Brigade	Royal Buckinghamshire Hussars (Note: Became C or 101st Battalion, Machine Gun Corps in April 1918.); Queen's Own Oxfordshire Hussars (Note: Left September 1914 for France, joined the 2nd Cavalry Brigade in October then the 8th Cavalry Brigade in November 1914.); Berkshire Yeomanry (Note: Became C or 101st Battalion, Machine Gun Corps in April 1918.); **Queen's Own Dorset Yeomanry (Note: Replaced Oxfordshire Hussars in September 1914. Finished the war in the 4th Cavalry Division.)	Berkshire Royal Horse Artillery
Scottish Horse Mounted Brigade formed November 1914	1st Scottish Horse (Note: Became the 13th (Scottish Horse Yeomanry) Battalion, Black Watch in October 1916.); 2nd Scottish Horse (Note: Became the 13th (Scottish Horse Yeomanry) Battalion, Black Watch in October 1916.); 3rd Scottish Horse (Note: Became the 26th (Scottish Horse) Squadron, Machine Gun Corps in October 1916.)	
Yeomanry Mounted Brigade formed January 1915	Hertfordshire Yeomanry; 2nd County of London Yeomanry	

== See also ==
- British cavalry during the First World War
- Second line yeomanry regiments of the British Army
- British First World War cavalry generals

== Bibliography ==
- Badsey, Stephen (2008). Doctrine and Reform in the British Cavalry 1880–1918. Ashgate Publishing, Ltd. ISBN 9780754664673.
- Barthorp, Michael (1989). The Old Contemptibles. Vol. 24 of Elite Series. Osprey Publishing. ISBN 978-0-85045-898-5.
- Becke, Archibald F. (1936). Order of Battle of Divisions Part 2A. The Territorial Force Mounted Divisions and the 1st-Line Territorial Force Divisions (42–56). London: HMSO. OCLC 4405016.
- Childers, Erskine (1911). German influence on British cavalry. Arnold. ISBN 9781110852093.
- Edmonds, J. E. (1922). History of the Great War. Military Operations, France and Belgium 1914. History of the Great War. Vol. I. Macmillan & Co. ISBN 978-1870423564.
- Griffith, Paddy (1998). British Fighting Methods in the Great War. Routledge. ISBN 9780714634951.
- Gudmundsson, Bruce (2005). The British Expeditionary Force 1914–15. Vol. 16 of Battle Orders. Osprey Publishing. ISBN 9781841769028.
- Haythornthwaite, Philip (1991). Gallipoli 1915: Frontal Assault on Turkey. Vol. 8 of Osprey campaign series. Osprey Publishing. ISBN 9781855321113.
- Holmes, Richard (2005). Tommy–The British Soldier on the Western Front 1914–1918. Harper Collins. ISBN 9780007137527.
- James, Brigadier E.A. (1978). British Regiments 1914–18. London: Samson Books Limited. ISBN 0-906304-03-2.
- Lord, Cliff (2012). The Royal Corps of Signals: Unit Histories of the Corps (1920–2001), and Its Antecedents. Helion & Company Limited. ISBN 9781874622925.
- Miller, Stephen M (2007). Volunteers on the Veld, Britain's Citizen-Soldiers and the South African War, 1899–1902. Vol. 12 of Campaigns and Commanders. University of Oklahoma Press. ISBN 9780806138640.
- Rinaldi, Richard A (2008). Order of Battle of the British Army 1914. Ravi Rikhye. ISBN 978-0-97760728-0.
- Roy, Kaushik (2011). The Indian Army in the Two World Wars. Vol. 70 of History of Warfare. BRILL. ISBN 9789004185500.
- Royal, Trevor (2011). The Black Watch: A Concise History. Random House. ISBN 9781780572543.
- Sumner, Ian (2001). The Indian Army 1914–1947. Vol. 75 of Osprey elite series. Osprey Publishing. ISBN 9781841761961.
- Westlake, Ray (1992). British Territorial Units 1914–18. Vol. 245 of Men-at-Arms Series. Osprey Publishing. ISBN 978-1-85532-168-7. Archived from the original on 7 March 2016.
- Great Britain. Army. Egyptian expeditionary force. A brief record of the advance of the Egyptian expeditionary force under the command of General Sir Edmund H. H. Allenby, July 1917 to October 1918. H. M. Stationery Office.
