= Queen's Own Lowland Yeomanry =

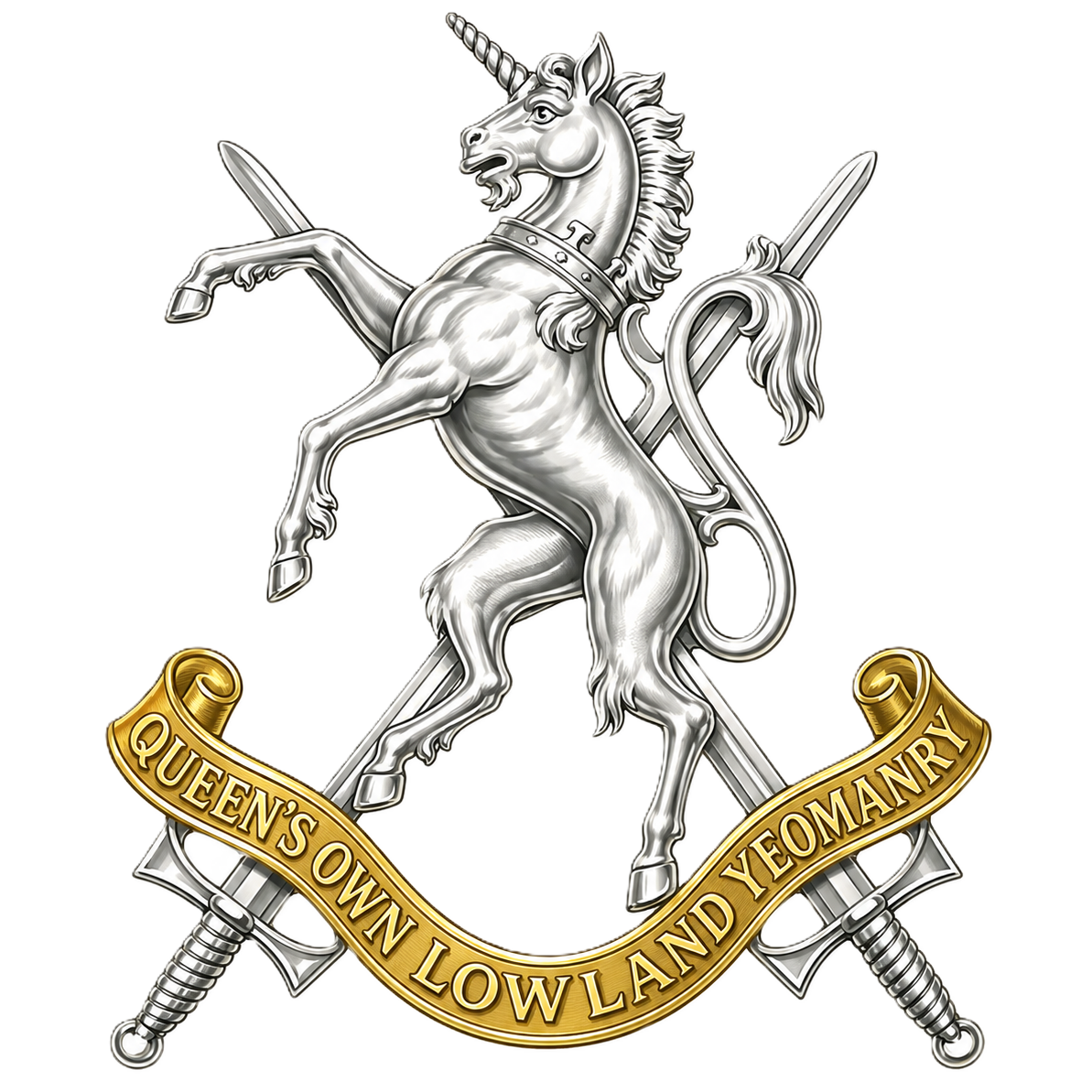
- cap badge
- Active: 1956–1975
- Country: United Kingdom
- Branch: British Army
- Type: Cavalry
- Role: Yeomanry
- Part of: Royal Armoured Corps

The Queen's Own Lowland Yeomanry was a British Army unit formed in 1956 and disbanded in 1975.

== History ==
The regiment was formed through the amalgamation of the Lanarkshire Yeomanry, The Queen's Own Royal Glasgow Yeomanry, and 1st/2nd Lothians and Border Horse Yeomanry in October 1956. It was reduced to a cadre in 1969 and disbanded in 1975.
