= Thomas Caldwell (soldier) =

Scottish Victoria Cross recipient (1894-1969)

- Born: 10 February 1894; Carluke, South Lanarkshire
- Died: 6 June 1969 (aged 75); Adelaide, Australia
- Military career
- Allegiance: United Kingdom
- Branch: British Army
- Rank: Company Sergeant-Major
- Units: Royal Scots Fusiliers
- Conflicts: World War I
- Awards: Victoria Cross

Thomas Caldwell VC (10 February 1894 – 6 June 1969) was a Scottish recipient of the Victoria Cross, the highest and most prestigious award for gallantry in the face of the enemy that can be awarded to British and Commonwealth forces.

Caldwell was 24 years old, and a sergeant in the 12th (Ayr & Lanark Yeomanry) Battalion, the Royal Scots Fusiliers, British Army during the First World War when the following deed took place for which he was awarded the VC. The full citation was published in a supplement to The London Gazette of 3 January 1919 (dated 6 January 1919) and read:

War Office, 6th January, 1919.

His Majesty the KING has been graciously pleased to approve of the award of the Victoria Cross to the undermentioned Officers, Noncommissioned Officers and Men: —

[...]

No. 295536 Sjt Thomas Caldwell, 12th Bn, R. Sc. Fus. (Carluke).

For most conspicuous bravery and initiative in attack near Audenarde on the 31st October 1918 near Audenarde, Belgium, when in command of a Lewis gun section engaged in clearing a farmhouse. When his section came under intense fire at close range from another farm, Sjt. Caldwell rushed towards the farm, and, in spite of very heavy fire, reached the enemy position, which he captured single-handed, together with 18 prisoners.

This gallant and determined exploit removed a serious obstacle from the line of advance, saved many casualties, and led to the capture by his section of about 70 prisoners, eight machine guns and one trench mortar.

He later achieved the rank of company sergeant-major.

His Victoria Cross is displayed at the Museum of The Royal Highland Fusiliers in Glasgow.

== Bibliography ==
- Monuments to Courage (David Harvey, 1999)
- The Register of the Victoria Cross (This England, 1997)
- Scotland's Forgotten Valour (Graham Ross, 1995)
- Gliddon, Gerald (2014) [2000]. The Final Days 1918. VCs of the First World War. Stroud, Gloucestershire: History Press. ISBN 978-0-7509-5368-9.
