= Hasell (surname) =

Hasell is a surname and occasional given name. Notable people with the name include:

- Alfred Hasell (1872–1955), English cricketer
- Elizabeth Julia Hasell (1830–1887), English writer and literary reviewer
- Eva Hasell (1886–1974), British traveller and missionary in Canada
- James Hasell (fl. 1763–1771), British colonial official in North Carolina
- Neil Hasell (1918–1998), Australian rules footballer
- Samuel Hasell (1691–1751), Mayor of Philadelphia
- W. Hasell Wilson (1811–1902), American surveyor and civil engineer

== Other uses ==
- D. Hasell Heyward House, Bluffton, South Carolina
- Hasell Point Site, Beaufort County, South Carolina

== See also ==
- Haskell (surname)
- Hassell (surname)
- Haswell (surname)
