= 18th Mounted Brigade =

2/1st Yorkshire Mounted Brigade 18th Mounted Brigade 11th Cyclist Brigade 7th Cyclist Brigade
- Active: 1915–1918
- Country: United Kingdom
- Branch: British Army
- Type: Yeomanry; Bicycle infantry
- Size: Brigade
- Service: World War I

The 18th Mounted Brigade, previously known as the 2/1st Yorkshire Mounted Brigade, was a 2nd Line yeomanry brigade of the British Army during the First World War. In July 1916 it was converted to a cyclist formation as 11th Cyclist Brigade and in November 1916 was redesignated as 7th Cyclist Brigade. It was still in existence, in Ireland, at the end of the war.

== Mounted Brigade ==
In accordance with the Territorial and Reserve Forces Act 1907 (7 Edw.7, c.9) which brought the Territorial Force into being, the TF was intended to be a home defence force for service during wartime and members could not be compelled to serve outside the country. However, on the outbreak of war on 4 August 1914, many members volunteered for Imperial Service. Therefore, TF units were split in August and September 1914 into 1st Line (liable for overseas service) and 2nd Line (home service for those unable or unwilling to serve overseas) units. Later, a 3rd Line was formed to act as a reserve, providing trained replacements for the 1st and 2nd Line regiments. Similarly, by 1915 most 2nd Line yeomanry regiments were formed into 2nd Line mounted brigades with the same title and composition as the pre-war 1st Line formations. Two other 2nd Line brigades (2/1st Southern Mounted Brigade and 2/1st Western Mounted Brigade) without 1st Line antecedents were also formed.

2/1st Yorkshire Mounted Brigade was a mirror formation of the 1st Line Yorkshire Mounted Brigade. It was raised in Yorkshire and had under command the 2/1st Yorkshire Hussars, the 2/1st Queen's Own Yorkshire Dragoons, and the 2/1st East Riding of Yorkshire Yeomanry. By March 1916, the brigade was in the Beverley area. On 31 March 1916, the remaining Mounted Brigades were ordered to be numbered in a single sequence and the brigade became 18th Mounted Brigade, still in Yorkshire under Northern Command.

== Cyclist Brigade ==
In July 1916 there was a major reorganization of 2nd Line yeomanry units in the United Kingdom. All but 12 regiments were converted to cyclists and as a consequence the brigade was converted to 11th Cyclist Brigade. Further reorganization in October and November 1916 saw the brigade redesignated as 7th Cyclist Brigade in November, now in the Bridlington area. In March 1917, the Yorkshire Hussars moved to Driffield and the Yorkshire Dragoons to Barmston; in July, the Yorkshire Dragoons moved to Burton Agnes and were replaced at Barmston by the Yorkshire Hussars; both regiments returned to Bridlington in January 1918.

About May 1918 the Brigade moved to Ireland. 2/1st Yorkshire Hussars was stationed at Fermoy, County Cork and Fethard, County Tipperary the 2/1st Yorkshire Dragoons at Fermoy, and the 2/1st East Riding at Bandon, County Cork and Fermoy. There were no further changes before the end of the war.

== See also ==
- Yorkshire Mounted Brigade for the 1st Line formation
- British yeomanry during the First World War
- Second line yeomanry regiments of the British Army

== Bibliography ==
- James, Brigadier E.A. (1978). British Regiments 1914–18. London: Samson Books Limited. ISBN 0-906304-03-2.
- Rinaldi, Richard A (2008). Order of Battle of the British Army 1914. Ravi Rikhye. ISBN 978-0-97760728-0.
