= Hassell (surname) =

Hassell, also von Hassell, is an English and German surname. Notable people with the surname include the following:

- Albert Young Hassell (1841–1918), Australian pastoralist and politician
- Alex Hassell (born 1980), English actor
- Bill Hassell (born 1943), Australian former politician
- Bobby Hassell (born 1980), English footballer with Mansfield Town and Barnsley
- Eddie Hassell (1990–2020), American actor
- Ethel Hassell née Clifton (1857–1933) colonial author of Albany, Western Australia
- Frank Hassell (born 1988), American basketball player
- Gerald Hassell (born 1952), American banker
- J. T. Hassell (born 1995), American football player
- John Hassell (artist) (c. 1767 – 1825), English artist
- John Frederick Tasman Hassell (1788–1883), Australian pastoralist
- Jon Hassell (1937–2021), American trumpet player and composer
- Kenyatté Hassell, American politician
- Leroy R. Hassell, Sr. (1955–2011), American judge; first African-American Chief Justice of Virginia
- Michael Hassell (born 1942), a British biologist, noted for his work in population ecology, especially in insects
- Randall G. Hassell, American karate expert
- Robert Hassell III (born 2001), American baseball player
- Tina Hassel (born 1964), German journalist
- Trenton Hassell (born 1979), American basketball player
- Ulrich von Hassell (1881–1944), German diplomat; executed for his participation in the 20 July assassination plot against Hitler

== See also ==
- Hasell (surname)
