= Westmorland and Cumberland Yeomanry =

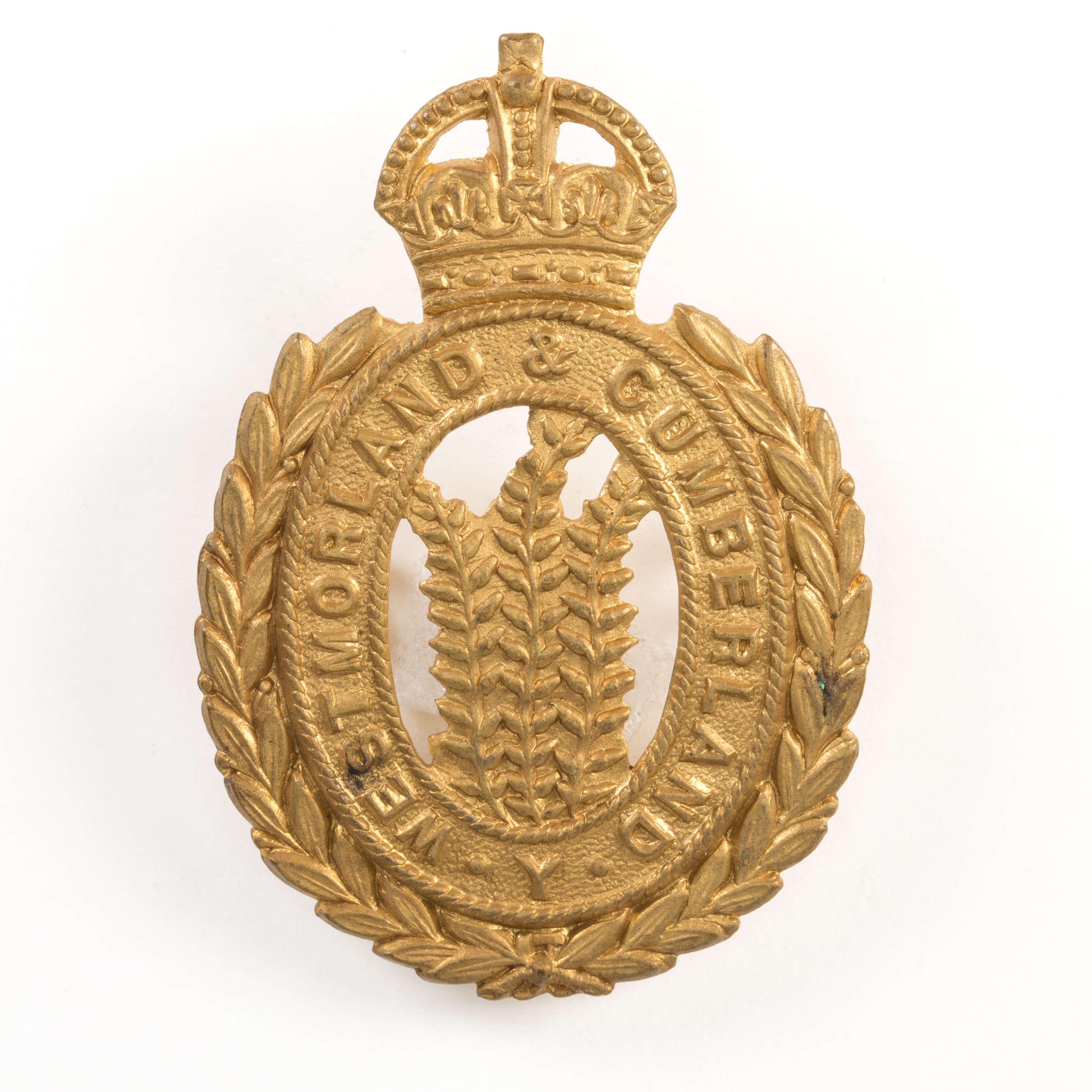
- Cap badge of the Westmorland & Cumberland Yeomanry
- Active: 16 October 1798–1 April 1971
- Country: United Kingdom
- Branch: Territorial Force
- Type: Yeomanry
- Role: Cavalry; Field Artillery
- Size: 1–3 Regiments
- Garrison/HQ: Penrith; Artillery Drill Hall, Carlisle (from 1920)
- Nickname: Cumberland Hussars
- Engagements: Second Boer War; Faber's Put; First World War; France and Flanders 1915–18; Second World War; Norwegian campaign; Western Desert campaign; Siege of Tobruk; Operation Thursday
- Battle honours: See battle honours below

The Westmorland and Cumberland Yeomanry was a Yeomanry Cavalry regiment of the British Army with its origins in 1798. The regiment provided troops for the Imperial Yeomanry during the Second Boer War and served on the Western Front in the First World War, latterly as infantry. The regiment converted to artillery in 1920 and served as such in the early years of the Second World War, before becoming part of the Chindits in Burma. Postwar, it served as a gunner regiment until 1971, when the title disappeared.

== French Revolutionary and Napoleonic Wars ==
After Britain was drawn into the French Revolutionary Wars, Prime Minister William Pitt the Younger proposed in 1794 that the counties should form a force of Volunteer Yeoman Cavalry (Yeomanry) that could be called on by the King to defend the country against invasion or by the Lord Lieutenant to subdue any civil disorder within the county. By the end of the year, 27 counties, mainly in the invasion-threatened South and Midlands of England, had raised Yeomanry. In the spring of 1798 the threat of invasion seemed more acute, and the government encouraged the formation of local armed associations of cavalry and infantry for purely local defence. The first independent Yeomanry Troops now appeared in Cumberland:

- Eskdale Five Kirks Yeomanry Cavalry, 16 October 1798
- Cumberland Yeomanry Cavalry, 25 October 1798
- Penrith Yeomanry Cavalry, 15 October 1801

All the Volunteer Cavalry were disbanded after the Treaty of Amiens, but the peace was short-lived, and on the resumption of war a new cavalry troop, the Cumberland Rangers, was raised on about 18 May 1803. The Eskdale Five Kirks and Cumberland Cavalry troops were reformed in 1806.

== 19th century ==
After Waterloo the main role for the Yeomanry was to suppress civil disorder (they were paid while on duty). In 1819 (the year of Peterloo) six independent troops of Westmorland Yeomanry Cavalry were raised at his own expense by Colonel the Hon Henry Lowther, MP. These were formed from 22 October 1819 across both Westmorland and Cumberland:

Westmorland

- Kendal
- Shap
- Appleby

Cumberland

- Edenhall
- Dalemain
- Milnthorpe

By 1826 the Westmorland Yeomanry troops had been reduced to just two, and in 1828 the government withdrew funding for the yeomanry. However, in many counties, the Yeomanry continued without pay: the independent troops across Westmorland and Cumberland combined as a single force, the Westmorland and Cumberland Yeomanry (WCY). Pay for duty was restored in 1831 when there was further civil unrest. When Col Lowther retired from the command to become colonel of the Royal Cumberland Militia, Edward Williams Hasell of Dalemain took command of the yeomanry on 30 May 1830 and remained its lieutenant-colonel commandant for 46 years. The Westmorland and Cumberland Yeomanry were called on to suppress chartist riots at Penrith and Carlisle in 1839 and in 1846 to halt fighting between English and Irish labourers working on the Lancaster and Carlisle Railway at Lowther Park, which spilled over into Penrith town centre.

The WCY troops usually assembled for annual training at Kendal, Penrith or Appleby, but when a new troop was raised in Wigton in 1840 Kendal and Appleby were deemed too far away, and thereafter training was concentrated at Penrith. This was usually held at Penrith Racecourse with the men billeted in inns in the town. The WCY troops were formally regimented in 1843.

Following the Cardwell Reforms a mobilisation scheme began to appear in the Army List from December 1875. This assigned Regular Army and Yeomanry units places in an order of battle of corps, divisions and brigades for the 'Active Army', even though these formations were entirely theoretical, with no staff or services assigned. The Westmorland & Cumberland, Lanark, and East Lothian Yeomanry constituted the Cavalry Brigade of VIII Corps based at Musselburgh. This was never more than a paper organisation, but from April 1893 the Army List showed the Yeomanry regiments grouped into brigades for collective training. They were commanded by the senior regimental commanding officer but they did have a Regular Army Brigade major. The Westmorland & Cumberland Yeomanry together with the Duke of Lancaster's Own Yeomanry formed the 14th Yeomanry Brigade. The Yeomanry brigades disappeared from the Army List after the Second Boer War.

Lieutenant-Col Hasell was succeeded in command by Lt-Col Richard Burn (26 September 1876) and then Sir Henry Ralph Fletcher-Vane, 4th Baronet was promoted to the command on 24 December 1879. He remained in command until 1891 when he was appointed the regiment's Honorary Colonel. Hugh Lowther, 5th Earl of Lonsdale was appointed Lt-Col in command of the regiment on 3 March 1897. His elder brother St George Lowther, 4th Earl of Lonsdale had also been an officer in the regiment before his early death in 1882.

== Imperial Yeomanry ==
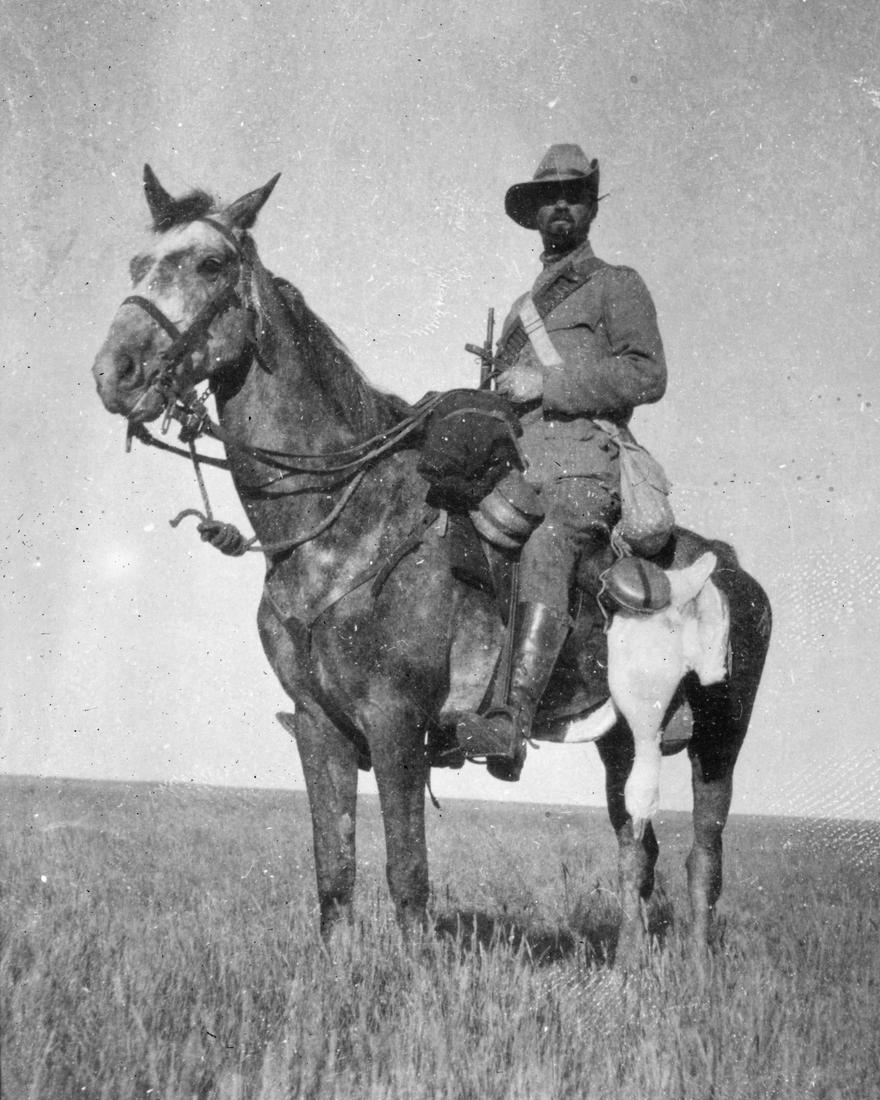
A typical Imperial Yeoman on campaign

Following a string of defeats during Black Week in early December 1899, the British government realised that it would need more troops than just the regular army to fight the Second Boer War. On 13 December, the decision to allow volunteer forces to serve in South Africa was made, and a Royal Warrant was issued on 24 December. This officially created the Imperial Yeomanry (IY). The force was organised as county service companies of approximately 115 men signed up for one year, and volunteers from the Yeomanry and civilians (usually middle and upper class) quickly filled the new force, which was equipped to operate as Mounted infantry, armed with a Lee–Metford infantry rifle and bayonet instead of a cavalry carbine and sabre. The Westmorland & Cumberland Yeomanry raised the 24th (Westmorland & Cumberland) Company, which landed in South Africa on 5 March 1900 and served in 8th Battalion, IY. From February 1900 to 1901, during the first part of the war, the Earl of Lowther was Assistant Adjutant-General for the Imperial Yeomanry.

From early May 1900 23rd and 24th Companies of the 8th Bn and 19th (Paget's Horse) Bn were serving under the Earl of Erroll with Sir Charles Warren's Column operating in Griqualand West. Warren began his advance before all the troops had assembled, and entered Douglas on 21 May. The Boers were at Campbell, blocking the route up onto the Kaap Plateau. On 26 May the column camped at Faber's Put, a farmstead a few miles south of Campbell. 23rd and 24th Companies and a small detachment of Paget's Horse were in camp. Warren had placed insufficient pickets and before dawn on 30 May a force of Boers surrounded the camp, infiltrated into the garden and prepared to attack. Spotted by a Yeomanry sentry who fired on them, the Boers fired back and a furious firefight ensued, while the Boers stampeded the Yeomanry's horses and shooting down gun crews. The two IY companies advanced to support their picket on the southern ridge and brought their two Colt machine guns into action. Leaving a party to keep down enfilading fire from the garden, and the Paget's Horse detachment to protect the machine guns, the rest of the IY advanced by rushes over open ground towards the ridge. Themselves under enfilade fire from the picket in the rocks, the Boers retired from the ridge before the Yeomanry arrived with their bayonets. The rest of the Boers in the garden ran back to their horses and rode off before the Yeomanry could recover their own horses. After the action at Faber's Put Warren was able to clear Griqualand West without further trouble.

The First Contingent of the Imperial Yeomanry completed their year's term of service in 1901 and 24th Company went home in May, having earned the regiment its first Battle honour: South Africa 1900–01.

The Imperial Yeomanry were trained and equipped as mounted infantry. The concept was considered a success and before the war ended the existing Yeomanry regiments at home (including the WCY) were converted into Imperial Yeomanry, with an establishment of Regimental Headquarters (RHQ) and four squadrons with a machine gun section. It was based at Portland Place in Lowther Street, Penrith. (Note: The drill hall was damaged by fire in 1963 and then demolished in 1965.) In 1900 the WCY carried out its annual training on Brackenber Moor near Appleby, and later the Earl of Lonsdale made available the 'Elysian Fields' at Lowther Park.

== Territorial Force ==
When the Imperial Yeomanry were subsumed into the new Territorial Force (TF) in the 1908 Haldane Reforms (under the Territorial and Reserve Forces Act 1907 (7 Edw. 7, c.9), the WCY transferred to the new force, dropping the 'Imperial' from its title and administered by the Cumberland and Westmorland Territorial Association under the chairmanship of the Earl of Lonsdale, now the regiment's Hon Colonel. It was now distributed as follows:

- RHQ at Lowther Street, Penrith
- A Squadron at Queen Katherine Street Drill Hall, Kendal
  - Detachments at Carnforth; Tran Road, Kirkby Lonsdale; Ulverston; and Windermere
- B Squadron at Penrith
  - Detachments at Penrith Road, Keswick; Temple Sowerby; and St Helen's Street, Cockermouth
- C Squadron at 20 Catherine Street, Whitehaven
  - Detachments at Workington; 51 Curzon Street, Maryport; and Barrow-in-Furness
- D Squadron at Riding School, Swift's Row, Carlisle
  - Detachments at George Street, Wigton; and Alston

The WCY, together with the two yeomanry regiments in Lancashire, was attached to the TF's Welsh Border Mounted Brigade for peacetime training, but would be assigned to other formations in the event of war. For the 1911 annual manoeuvres one of the regiment's squadron commanders, Major (Brevet Lt-Col) C. Beddington, provided his squadron with portable wireless equipment at his own expense.

== First World War ==
=== Mobilisation ===
On the outbreak of war on 4 August 1914 the TF mobilised at its drill stations. The WCY had been commanded by Lt-Col S.R. Fothergill since 9 February 1911. The second-in-command was Sir Bryan Baldwin Mawddwy Leighton, 9th Baronet. Leighton had seen active service in Bechuanaland in 1897, in the Spanish–American War in 1898, and in the Second Boer War, and had worked as a war correspondent. He commanded the WCY later in the First World War.

Under the 1907 Act, the TF was intended as a home defence force and could not be compelled to serve overseas. However, on the outbreak of war TF units were invited to volunteer for Overseas Service and the majority of individuals did so. The units were thereupon split into 1st Line (liable for overseas service) and 2nd Line (home service for those unable or unwilling to serve overseas) units. Later, a 3rd Line was formed to act as a reserve, providing trained replacements for the 1st and 2nd Line regiments.

=== 1/1st Westmorland and Cumberland Yeomanry ===
The 1/1st was mobilised on 4 August 1914 and attached to the Welsh Border Mounted Brigade. In the spring of 1915, the regiment was split: A Squadron's personnel were divided between the three other squadrons, which were then each assigned to an infantry division of 'Kitchener's Army' assembling in the United Kingdom - B Squadron to 15th (Scottish) Division; C Squadron to 18th (Eastern) Division; Regimental Headquarters and D Squadron to 20th (Light) Division. The three squadrons accompanied their divisions to France that summer. B Squadron was attached to the 1st Cavalry Division for the first half of April 1916; C and D squadrons were both attached to the 2nd Cavalry Division for a short period in the following month. On 15 May 1916, the regiment reformed and served as XI Corps Cavalry Regiment.

In June 1917, it was announced that, due to manpower shortages, the regiment would be dismounted and retrained as infantry. On 22 September 21 officers and 239 other ranks were absorbed into 7th (Service) Battalion, Border Regiment, which was redesignated the 7th (Westmorland and Cumberland Yeomanry) Battalion.

=== 2/1st Westmorland and Cumberland Yeomanry ===
The 2nd line regiment was formed in September 1914. By July 1915, it was under the command of the 2/1st Western Mounted Brigade (along with 2/1st Duke of Lancaster's Own Yeomanry and the 2/1st Lancashire Hussars) and in March 1916 was at Cupar, Fife. On 31 March 1916, the remaining Mounted Brigades were numbered in a single sequence and the brigade became 21st Mounted Brigade, still at Cupar under Scottish Command.

In July 1916 there was a major reorganization of 2nd Line yeomanry units in the United Kingdom. All but 12 regiments were converted to cyclists and as a consequence the regiment was dismounted and the brigade converted to 14th Cyclist Brigade. Further reorganisation in October and November 1916 saw the brigade redesignated as 10th Cyclist Brigade in October 1916, still at Cupar.

By January 1918, 10th Cyclist Brigade had moved to Lincolnshire with the regiment at Spilsby and Burgh-le-Marsh. About May 1918 the Brigade moved to Ireland and the regiment was stationed at Buttevant and Charleville, County Cork. There were no further changes before the end of the war.

=== 3/1st Westmorland and Cumberland Yeomanry ===
The 3rd Line regiment was formed in 1915 and in the summer it was affiliated to a Reserve Cavalry Regiment in Ireland. In the summer of 1916 it was affiliated to 10th Reserve Cavalry Regiment at The Curragh. It was absorbed by the 2nd Reserve Cavalry Regiment, still at The Curragh, in early 1917. By 1918 it had left the 2nd Reserve Cavalry Regiment when the 1st Line regiment was converted to infantry and joined 5th (Reserve) Battalion, Durham Light Infantry at Sutton-on-Hull.

== Interwar ==
Cap badge of the Royal Regiment of Artillery

Before the TF reformed on 7 February 1920 the War Office had decided that only a small number of mounted Yeomanry regiments would be required in future, and the remainder would have to be re-roled, mainly as artillery. Only the 14 senior Yeomanry regiments were retained as horsed cavalry. (Note: Two regiments of Scouts also remained mounted; of the remainder of the Yeomanry regiments 1 became a mounted signals unit, 8 became armoured car companies, and the remainder (27) transferred to the Royal Artillery (RA).) The WCY, 17th in the order of precedence, therefore converted to the Royal Field Artillery (RFA) as 2nd (Cumberland Yeomanry) Army Brigade (Note: In the Royal Artillery prior to 1938 a brigade was a lieutenant-colonel's command consisting of independent batteries 'brigaded' together; it was not comparable with an infantry or cavalry brigade commanded by a brigadier-general. In the Territorials, unlike the Regulars, unit heritage is carried by the brigade/regiment, rather than the battery.) with two batteries and headquarters at Carlisle. When the TF was reorganised as the Territorial Army in 1921 these were numbered as:

93rd (Westmorland & Cumberland) Army Brigade, RFA

- 369 (Westmorland Yeomanry) Battery
- 370 (Cumberland Yeomanry) Battery

A further reorganisation on 1 June 1923 saw the brigade exchange its number and two Cumberland batteries with 51st (East Lancashire & Cumberland) Brigade, becoming a four-battery brigade within 42nd (East Lancashire) Division. Finally, on 1 June 1924 the RFA was subsumed into the RA and its units were termed 'Field Brigades' and 'Field Batteries', giving the following organisation: (Note: The ex-Yeomanry Btys 369/370 were always listed ahead of 203/204 because cavalry had higher precedence than artillery.)

51st (Westmorland & Cumberland) Field Brigade, RA

- Headquarters at Artillery Drill Hall, Albert Street, Carlisle
- 369 (Westmorland Yeomanry) Field Bty at Carlisle
- 370 (Cumberland Yeomanry) Field Bty at Carlisle, moving to the Riding School by 1937
- 203 (Cumberland) Field Bty at Whitehaven
- 204 (Cumberland) Field Bty (Howitzers) at Workington

The establishment of a TA divisional artillery brigade was three 6-gun batteries with 18-pounder guns and one 6-gun battery of 4.5-inch howitzers, all of First World War patterns. However, the batteries only held four guns in peacetime. The guns and their first-line ammunition wagons were horsedrawn and the battery staffs were mounted. Partial mechanisation was carried out from 1927, but the guns retained iron-tyred wheels until pneumatic wheels began to be introduced just before the outbreak of the Second World War.

In 1938 the RA modernised its nomenclature and a lieutenant-colonel's command was designated a 'regiment' rather than a 'brigade'; this applied to TA field brigades from 1 November 1938.

The TA was doubled in size after the Munich Crisis, and most regiments formed duplicates. Part of the reorganisation was that field regiments changed from four six-gun batteries to an establishment of two batteries, each of three four-gun troops. For 51st Field Rgt this resulted in:

51st (Westmorland & Cumberland) Field Regiment, RA

- Regimental Headquarters (RHQ) at Riding School, Carlisle
- 370 (Cumberland Yeomanry) Field Bty at Riding School, Carlisle
- 203 (Cumberland) Field Bty at Whitehaven

109th Field Regiment, RA

- RHQ at Workington
- 369 (Westmorland Yeomanry) Field Bty at Artillery Drill Hall, Carlisle
- 204 (Cumberland) Field Bty at Workington

== Second World War ==
=== 51st (Westmorland and Cumberland) Field Regiment, RA ===
51st (Westmorland & Cumberland) Field Regiment began the war as part of 42nd (East Lancashire) Division. In April 1940, 203 Field Bty sailed to take part in the brief Norwegian Campaign. The reunited regiment sailed to Egypt towards the end of the year and saw action in the Western Desert Campaign, at the capture of Bardia under 6th Australian Division and then in the Siege of Tobruk with 9th Australian Division. After being withdrawn from Tobruk it took part in the bitter fighting of Operation Crusader, serving with the 7th Armoured Division (Desert Rats).

Following the Japanese attacks on Pearl Harbor and Malaya the regiment was moved in February 1942 to defend Ceylon as part of 16th Infantry Brigade. In February 1943, it moved to India, where it joined 70th Infantry Division. In September 1943, it was converted to infantry trained for Long Range Penetration with the 'Chindits'. It provided 51 Column under 16th Bde in the Second Chindit Expedition. Afterwards a portion of the men were repatriated to the UK, the remainder being posted to the Essex Regiment.

=== 109th (Westmorland and Cumberland) Field Regiment, RA ===
Compared to its parent regiment's rich and varied war service, 109th Field Rgt's war was uneventful. On mobilisation it continued to be administered by 42nd (EL) Division until that formation's duplicate, 66th Infantry Division, assumed full control of its units on 27 September 1939. It served in Western Command until 10 April 1940, when it moved to Northern Command, stationed in the West Riding of Yorkshire as one of the 'Julius Caesar' home defence divisions.

Home Forces were reorganised after the Dunkirk evacuation, and 66th Division was broken up to bring some of the motor divisions up to full infantry division strength. This included 55th (West Lancashire) Division, which 109th Field Rgt joined as its third field regiment on 1 July 1940. At the time the division formed part of XI Corps on the invasion-threatened coast of Suffolk, but was weak in artillery. Then in November it moved to the Sussex coast under IV Corps, where it remained on invasion alert until late in 1941.

It was only at the end of 1940 that the RA began producing enough battery staffs to start the process of changing regiments from a two-battery to a three-battery organisation. (Three 8-gun batteries were easier to handle, and it meant that each infantry battalion in a brigade could be closely associated with its own battery.) 109th Field Rgt formed a new 474 Field Bty in May 1941.

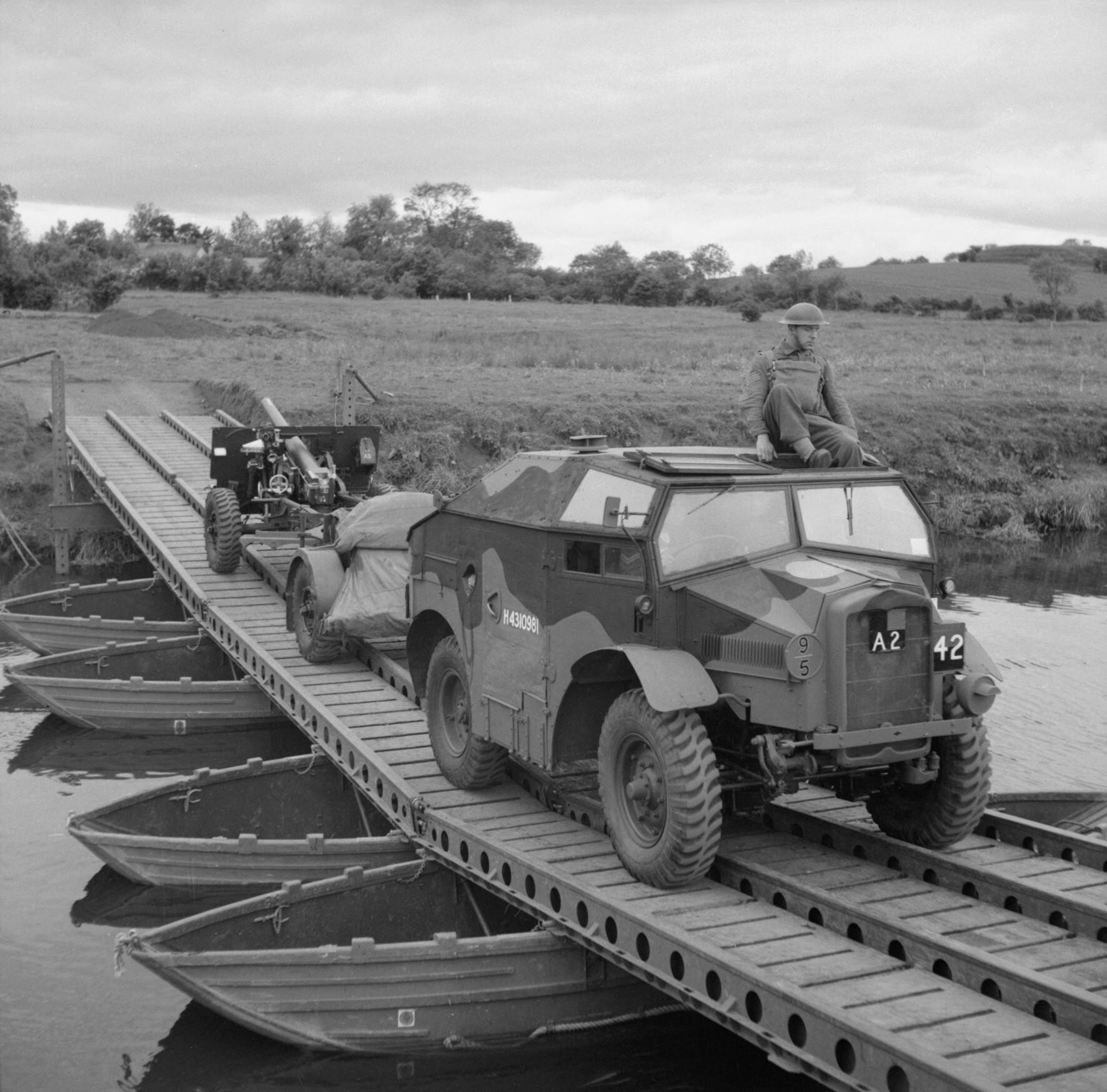
A 25-pounder gun towed by a Quad tractor on exercise in Northern Ireland.

In December the division returned to Yorkshire under Northern Command and in January 1942 it was placed on a lower establishment. This meant that it was a home defence formation with no immediate prospect of overseas service.

On 17 February 1942 the duplicate RA regiments were authorised to adopt the subtitles borne by their parent regiments, so the 109th became 109th (Westmoreland and Cumberland) Field Regiment, RA.

55th (WL) Division was in South-West England from the beginning of 1943 to the end of May 1943, then in South-East England for the rest of the year. On 21 December it crossed to Northern Ireland. In May 1944 55th (WL) Division reverted to the higher establishment, implying that it might be brought up to full strength and deployed to reinforce 21st Army Group in the invasion of North West Europe (Operation Overlord). However, although it was shipped back from Northern Ireland to England on 7 July 1944 and came under GHQ Home Forces, it was never employed, and it ended the war in Western Command. In January 1946 109th (W&C) Field Regiment began dispersing, and it was placed in suspended animation from 10 February.

== Postwar ==
When the TA was reconstituted on 1 January 1947, 51st Field Rgt reformed as 251 (Westmorland and Cumberland) Field Regiment at Carlisle with three batteries (probably P, Q and R Btys), and 109th Field Rgt as 309 (Westmorland and Cumberland) Coast Regiment at Workington with P, Q, R and S Btys. 251 Field Rgt was part of 42nd (Lancashire) Division, while 309 Coast Rgt was in 104 Coast Brigade.

On 1 August 1948 S Coast Bty was disbanded and 309 Rgt reverted to being 309 (Westmorland & Cumberland) Field Rgt with three batteries (P, Q and R). Then on 30 June 1950 it was merged into 251 Field Rgt as a battery. At the same time, 251 Field Rgt absorbed 640 (Border) Heavy Anti-Aircraft Rgt, which had been formed in 1947 by the conversion to artillery of 5th Battalion Border Regiment at Workington, and now became R Bty. On 30 September 1953 251 Rgt's subtitle was changed back to 'Westmorland & Cumberland Yeomanry'.

The amalgamated regiment was broken up in 1961, Q Battery at Carlisle becoming 851 (Westmorland and Cumberland Yeomanry) Independent Field Battery, RA, with a detachment at Maryport, while the Workington and Whitehaven batteries became the anti-tank and mortar platoons of 4th (Cumberland and Westmorland) Battalion, Border Regiment. In 1967, 851 Bty became B (Westmorland and Cumberland Yeomanry) Company of 4th (Territorial) Bn Border Regiment in the Territorial and Army Volunteer Reserve. The battalion was reduced to a cadre in 1969 and reconstituted as B (4th Border Regiment) Company, Northumbrian Volunteers, in 1971, when the yeomanry lineage was discontinued.

== Heritage and ceremonial ==
=== Uniforms and insignia ===
Details of the dress initially worn by the troops of Westmorland Yeomanry Cavalry remain obscure as only a shako has survived from the 1818 era and contemporary written records are vague: they were described at that time as wearing 'Skiddaw grey trousers and scarlet jackets with headgear that was wonderful to contemplate in shape as much like a big frying pan as anything'.

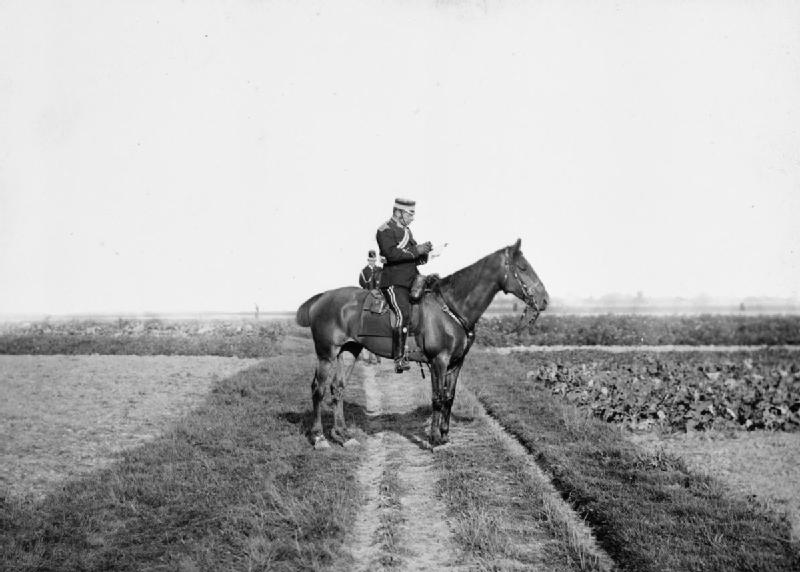
The Earl of Lonsdale in the undress uniform of the Westmorland & Cumberland Yeomanry, photographed while attending the Imperial German Army manoeuvres in 1902.

However, the Westmorland & Cumberland Yeomanry was later uniformed and equipped as Hussars. From 1830 to the 1850s a well documented scarlet hussar uniform was in use, heavily braided in white (silver for officers). Facing colours on collars and cuffs were also white, 'trowsers' (sic) were of blue cloth and shakos were worn with black feathers. In 1857 a seal-skin busby was adopted with a braided red bag and a red-and-white plume. The distinctive scarlet and white hussar dress was retained for full dress, stable duties and walking out dress for the remainder of the century, until plain blue service frocks appeared in 1892. In 1902-03 khaki clothing and slouch hats were issued as working and field dress. White facings were retained even on khaki. As part of the Territorial Force the regiment continued to wear the now historic hussar jackets as parade dress, although scarlet and white peaked forage caps replaced the busbies for other ranks. On mobilisation in August 1914 the regiment appeared in the standard khaki service dress of the regular cavalry, although initially ordered to retain the scarlet and white jackets of peacetime for off-duty wear.

After conversion to artillery the two Yeomanry batteries (369 and 370) were authorised to wear the WCY cap badge in 1923, while the two Cumberland batteries continued to wear the Royal Artillery 'gun' badge. However, it is not clear whether the yeomanry badge was actually used by these batteries, though until 1939 they did use the 'Y' (for yeomanry) over 'RA' brass shoulder title in place of the standard 'T' (for territorial) over 'RA'.

Between 1953 (when the word 'Yeomanry' returned to the regiment's subtitle) and 1961, 251 Field Rgt carried a supplementary arm title with 'W & C YEO' embroidered in silver on a green background, worn beneath the usual Royal Artillery title. In addition the regiment wore W&CY buttons on overcoats and No 1 Dress (white metal to 1961 when they were changed to gold anodised metal). The regiment also wore cavalry shoulder chains with the No 1 Dress. These distinctions were carried over to 851 (WYC) Bty in 1964, with in addition a newly designed silver anodised yeomanry cap badge that had been authorised for 251 Rgt but never used.

=== Battle honours ===
The Westmorland and Cumberland Yeomanry was awarded the following battle honours (honours in bold are emblazoned on the regimental colours):

Second Boer War	**South Africa 1900–01**
First World War	**Ypres 1917**, **Poelcappelle**, **Passchendaele**, **Somme 1918**, St. Quentin, Bapaume 1918, **Amiens**, Albert 1918, **Hindenburg Line**, **Épehy**, **Cambrai 1918**, Selle, **Sambre**, **France and Flanders 1915–18**
Second World War	The Royal Artillery was present in nearly all battles and would have earned most of the honours awarded to cavalry and infantry regiments. In 1833, William IV awarded the motto Ubique (meaning "everywhere") in place of all battle honours.

=== Honorary Colonels ===
The following served as Honorary Colonel of the regiment:

- Sir Henry Ralph Fletcher-Vane, 4th Baronet, former CO, appointed 29 August 1891, died 15 June 1908.
- Hugh Lowther, 5th Earl of Lonsdale, KG, GCVO, TD, former CO, appointed 16 November 1908
- Col Guy Joseph Pocklington-Senhouse, TD, appointed 17 February 1937
- Brig Viscount Rochdale, OBE, TD, appointed to 851 (W&C) Field Bty

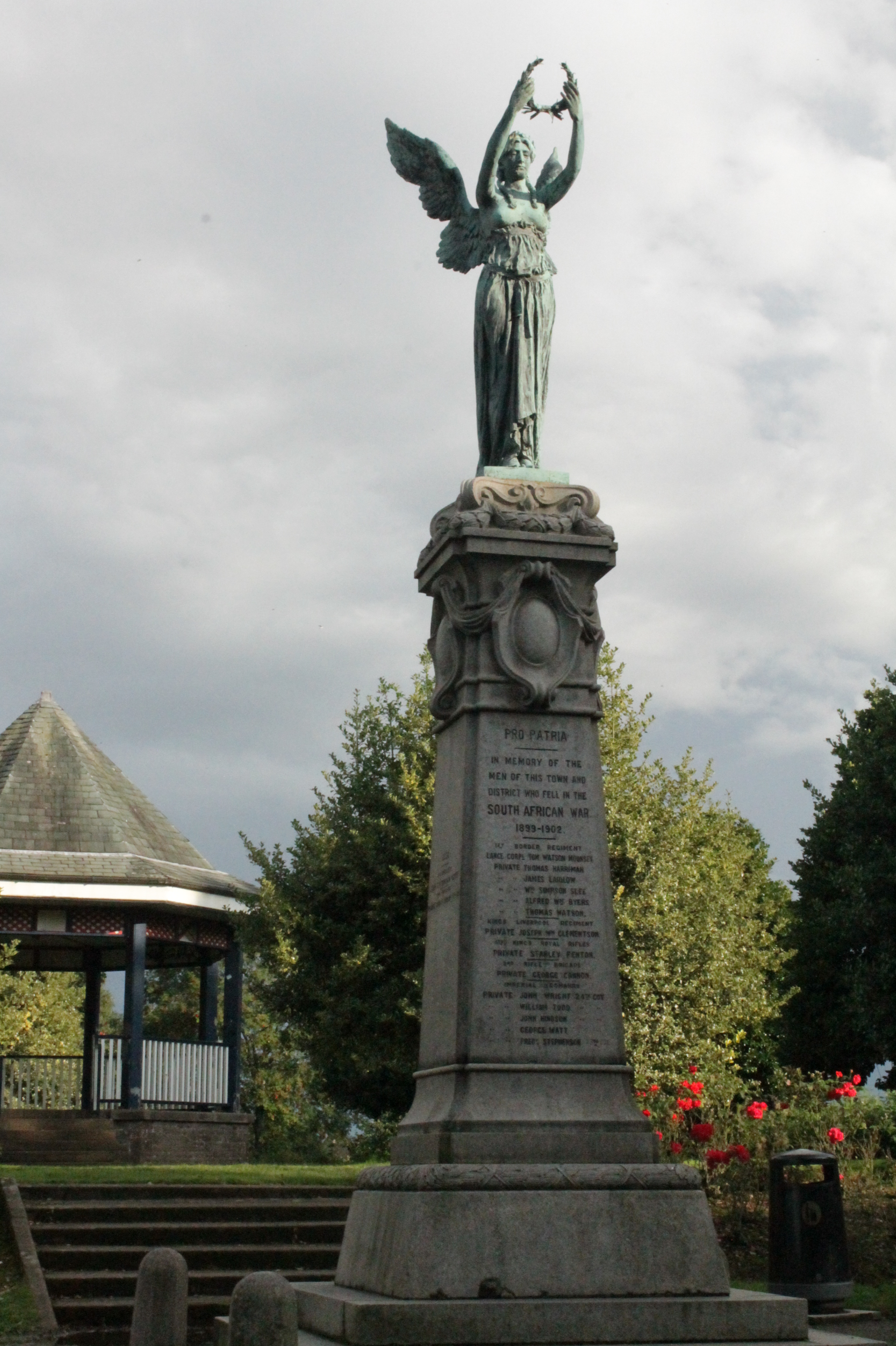
Penrith Memorial to the Boer War.

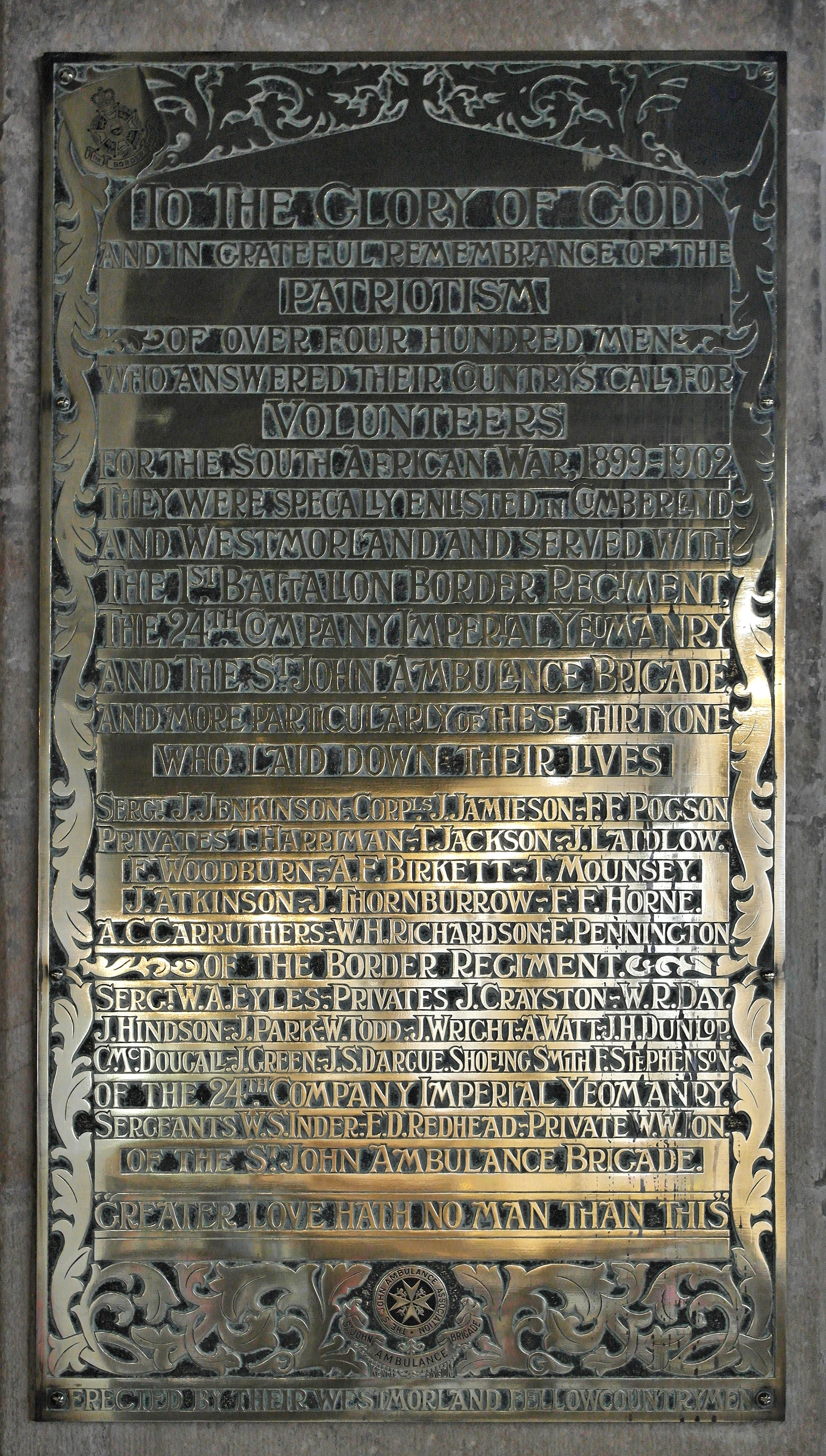
Memorial plaque in Holy Trinity, Kendal.

=== Memorials ===
A granite memorial to those townsmen who died in the Second Boer war (including members of 24th Company, IY, killed at Faber's Put in 1900), was erected in front of Penrith Town Hall. It was later relocated to Castle Park.

A brass plate in the Border Regiment Chapel in Holy Trinity Church, Kendal, list the men of 24th Company, IY, along with men of the Border Regiment and St John's Ambulance Brigade from Cumbria who died in the Second Boer War.

The Cumberland and Westmorland War Memorial in Rickerby Park, Carlisle, includes the badges of the Westmorland & Cumberland Yeomanry and Royal Artillery among others representing servicemen from both counties who died in the two world wars.

== See also ==
- Imperial Yeomanry
- List of Yeomanry Regiments 1908
- Yeomanry
- Yeomanry order of precedence
- British yeomanry during the First World War
- Second line yeomanry regiments of the British Army
- List of British Army Yeomanry Regiments converted to Royal Artillery

== Bibliography ==
- L.S. Amery (ed), The Times History of the War in South Africa 1899-1902, London: Sampson Low, Marston, 6 Vols 1900–09.
- L. Barlow and R.J. Smith, The Uniforms of the British Yeomanry Force 1794-1914. 4: Westmoreland and Cumberland Yeomanry, Tunbridge Wells: Ogilby Trust, ISBN 0-85936-285-X.
- Burke's Peerage, Baronetage and Knightage, 100th Edn, London, 1953.
- Basil Collier, History of the Second World War, United Kingdom Military Series: The Defence of the United Kingdom, London: HM Stationery Office, 1957/Uckfield: Naval & Military, 2004, ISBN 978-1-84574-055-9.
- T.K. Derry, History of the Second World War: The Campaign in Norway, London, HM Stationery Office, 1952/Uckfield: Naval & Military, 2004, ISBN 978-1-84574-057-3.
- Col John K. Dunlop, The Development of the British Army 1899–1914, London: Methuen, 1938.
- Gen Sir Martin Farndale, History of the Royal Regiment of Artillery: The Years of Defeat: Europe and North Africa, 1939–1941, Woolwich: Royal Artillery Institution, 1988/London: Brasseys, 1996, ISBN 1-85753-080-2.
- J.B.M. Frederick, Lineage Book of British Land Forces 1660–1978, Vol I, Wakefield, Microform Academic, 1984, ISBN 1-85117-007-3.
- J.B.M. Frederick, Lineage Book of British Land Forces 1660–1978, Vol II, Wakefield: Microform Academic, 1984, ISBN 1-85117-009-X.
- Brig E.A. James, British Regiments 1914–18, London: Samson Books, 1978, ISBN 0-906304-03-2/Uckfield: Naval & Military Press, 2001, ISBN 978-1-84342-197-9.
- Lt-Col H.F. Joslen, Orders of Battle, United Kingdom and Colonial Formations and Units in the Second World War, 1939–1945, London: HM Stationery Office, 1960/London: London Stamp Exchange, 1990, ISBN 0-948130-03-2/ Uckfield: Naval & Military Press, 2003, ISBN 1-843424-74-6.
- N.B. Leslie, Battle Honours of the British and Indian Armies 1695–1914, London: Leo Cooper, 1970, ISBN 0-85052-004-5.
- Norman E.H. Litchfield, The Territorial Artillery 1908–1988 (Their Lineage, Uniforms and Badges), Nottingham: Sherwood Press, 1992, ISBN 0-9508205-2-0.
- Patrick Mileham, The Yeomanry Regiments: 200 Years of Tradition, 2nd Edn, Edinburgh: Canongate Academic, 1994, ISBN 1-898410-36-4.
- Rinaldi, Richard A (2008). Order of Battle of the British Army 1914. Ravi Rikhye. ISBN 978-0-9776072-8-0.
- Col H.C.B. Rogers, The Mounted Troops of the British Army 1066–1945, London: Seeley Service, 1959.
- Tpr Cosmo Rose-Innes, With Paget's Horse to the Front, London: John McQueen, 1901/Leopold Classic Library, 2015, ASIN: B019SZWY6K.
- Lt-Col Ernest Ryan 'Arms, Uniforms and Equipment of the Yeomanry Cavalry', Journal of the Society for Army Historical Research, September 1957, Vol 35, pp. 124–33.
- Lt-Col J.D. Sainsbury, The Hertfordshire Yeomanry Regiments, Royal Artillery, Part 1: The Field Regiments 1920-1946, Welwyn: Hertfordshire Yeomanry and Artillery Trust/Hart Books, 1999, ISBN 0-948527-05-6.* Edward M. Spiers, The Army and Society 1815–1914, London: Longmans, 1980, ISBN 0-582-48565-7.
- Titles and Designations of Formations and Units of the Territorial Army, London: War Office, 7 November 1927 (RA sections also summarised in Litchfield, Appendix IV).

=== External links ===
- Anglo-Boer War
- Chris Baker, The Long, Long Trail
- British Army units from 1945 on
- 'Canada and the South African War', Canadian War Museum
- The Drill Hall Project
- Imperial War Museum, War Memorials Register
- Land Forces of Britain, the Empire and Commonwealth – Regiments.org (archive site)
- Great War Centenary Drill Halls
- Roll of Honour
- Graham Watson, The Territorial Army 1947
