= Lancashire Hussars =

- Badge of the Lancashire Hussars
- Active: 1798–1969
- Country: Kingdom of Great Britain (1798–1800); United Kingdom (1801–1969)
- Branch: British Army
- Type: Yeomanry
- Size: Regiment
- Part of: Royal Armoured Corps; Royal Artillery
- Battle honours: Second World War: No battle honours were awarded. It is tradition within artillery units that the Regiment's guns represent its colours and battle honours.

The Lancashire Hussars was a British Army unit originally formed in 1798. It saw action in the Second Boer War, the First World War and the Second World War. In 1969, the regiment reduced to a cadre and the Yeomanry lineage discontinued.

== History ==
=== Formation and early history ===
The regiment was originally formed in 1798 as independent troops. It became the Lancashire Yeomanry Cavalry in 1828. After being disbanded in 1832, it was re-formed as the Lancashire Hussars in 1848. It went on to become the Lancashire Hussars Imperial Yeomanry in 1901 and the Lancashire Hussars Yeomanry in 1908.

=== Second Boer War ===
On 13 December 1899, the decision to allow volunteer forces serve in the Second Boer War was made. Due to the string of defeats during Black Week in December 1899, the British government realised they were going to need more troops than just the regular army, thus issuing a Royal Warrant on 24 December 1899. This warrant officially created the Imperial Yeomanry. The Royal Warrant asked standing Yeomanry regiments to provide service companies of approximately 115 men each. In addition to this, many British citizens (usually mid-upper class) volunteered to join the new regiment. Together with the Duke of Lancaster's Own Yeomanry the regiment co-sponsored the 23rd and 32nd (Lancashire) Companies, and the Hussars also sponsored the 77th (Manchester) Company, which served in the 8th Battalion, IY.

The Imperial Yeomanry was equipped and trained as Mounted infantry. This experiment was considered a success, and all the existing Yeomanry regiments were converted into IY in 1901, the Hussars becoming the Lancashire Hussars Imperial Yeomanry. When the Yeomanry were subsumed into the Territorial Force in 1908, the 'Imperial' part of the title was dropped. The regiment was based at Prince Alfred Road in Liverpool at this time (since demolished).

=== First World War ===
In accordance with the Territorial and Reserve Forces Act 1907 (7 Edw. 7, c.9) which brought the Territorial Force into being, the TF was intended to be a home defence force for service during wartime and members could not be compelled to serve outside the country. However, on the outbreak of war on 4 August 1914, many members volunteered for Imperial Service. Therefore, TF units were split in August and September 1914 into 1st Line (liable for overseas service) and 2nd Line (home service for those unable or unwilling to serve overseas) units. Later, a 3rd Line was formed to act as a reserve, providing trained replacements for the 1st and 2nd Line regiments.

==== 1/1st Lancashire Hussars ====
The 1/1st was formed in Liverpool in August 1914 and attached to the Welsh Border Mounted Brigade. In 1915, the regiment was split up, the regimental headquarters and B Squadron joining the 31st Division and, after moving to France, being briefly attached to the 2nd Indian Cavalry Division. The rest of the regiment was attached to 35th Division, (C Squadron) and 30th Division, (D Squadron).

The regiment was re-formed in May 1916 to form the VIII Corps Cavalry Regiment. In July 1917, the regiment was dismounted and dispatched for training as infantry. This was completed in September 1917, when the men joined a battalion of the King's, which was redesignated as the 18th (Lancashire Hussars Yeomanry) Battalion, the King's (Liverpool) Regiment.

==== 2/1st Lancashire Hussars ====
The 2nd line regiment was formed in September 1914. By July 1915, it was under the command of the 2/1st Western Mounted Brigade (along with 2/1st Duke of Lancaster's Own Yeomanry, and the 2/1st Westmorland and Cumberland Yeomanry) and in March 1916 was at Cupar, Fife. On 31 March 1916, the remaining Mounted Brigades were numbered in a single sequence and the brigade became 21st Mounted Brigade, still at Cupar under Scottish Command.

In July 1916 there was a major reorganisation of 2nd line yeomanry units in the UK. All but 12 regiments were converted to cyclists and as a consequence the regiment was dismounted and the brigade converted to 14th Cyclist Brigade. Further reorganisation in October and November 1916 saw the brigade redesignated as 10th Cyclist Brigade in October 1916, still at Cupar. The regiment moved to St Andrews in July 1917.

By January 1918, 10th Cyclist Brigade had moved to Lincolnshire with the regiment at Skegness. About May 1918 the Brigade moved to Ireland and the regiment was stationed at Bandon and Buttevant, County Cork. There were no further changes before the end of the war.

==== 3/1st Lancashire Hussars ====
The 3rd Line regiment was formed in 1915 and in the summer it was affiliated to a Reserve Cavalry Regiment at The Curragh. In the summer of 1916 it was affiliated to the 10th Reserve Cavalry Regiment, also at The Curragh. It was absorbed by the 2nd Reserve Cavalry Regiment, still at The Curragh, in early 1917. By 1918 it had left the 2nd Reserve Cavalry Regiment when the 1st Line regiment was converted to infantry and joined 5th (Reserve) Battalion of the King's (Liverpool Regiment) at Oswestry.

=== Inter-War Years ===
In 1920, in common with many other Yeomanry regiments, the Lancashire Hussars were converted to a Royal Field Artillery (RFA) role and was redesignated as the 2nd (Lancashire) Army Brigade, RFA, at Manchester. In 1921, it was redesignated as the 106th (Lancashire Yeomanry) Brigade, RFA, and then when the RFA was subsumed into the Royal Artillery (RA) in 1924, as the 106th (Lancashire Yeomanry) Field Brigade, RA, with HQ returning to Liverpool. It served as 'Army Troops' in 55th (West Lancashire) Divisional Area. In 1938 it was retitled as the 106th (Lancashire Yeomanry) Regiment, Royal Horse Artillery.

=== Second World War ===
==== 106th (Lancashire Hussars) Regiment, RHA ====
At the start of the Second World War, the hussars comprised 423rd and 424th Batteries, based in Liverpool. By November 1939, it was part of the UK-based 1st Cavalry Division and was equipped with 4.5 inch Howitzers (424 Bty) and 18 pdr Field Guns (423 Bty). In January 1940, the regiment moved to Palestine.

It moved to North Africa in August 1940, by which time 424 Bty had become No. 1 and No. 2 Batteries (Anti-tank) and 423 Bty had become No. 3 and No. 4 Batteries (Anti-aircraft), known as 1/106 Bty, 1/102, Bty, etc. The former two were equipped with Bofors 37 mm anti-tank guns on Portees, and the latter two with captured Italian 20mm Breda Model 35 AA/AT guns. Each new battery consisted of only two troops, A and B (No. 1 Bty), C and D (No. 2 Bty), E and F (No. 3 Bty) and G and H (No.4 Bty). It served with the 7th Armoured Division during many of the early battles in North Africa.

At the end of February 1941, the regiment was advised that it was to become a Light Anti Aircraft (L.A.A) regiment of just three batteries (comprising 36 x 20mm Breda guns) and was then later known as 106th Light Anti-Aircraft Regiment, RA (Lancashire Hussars). In March 1941, the regiment deployed to Greece via Operation Lustre as part of W Force. Upon disembarking at Piraeus, the regiment deployed to Glyfada for 2 weeks training. Thereafter, the regiment was sent to defend the airstrip at Larissa. The German advance forced the British to retreat to the town of Nauplion, where the 106th were the only AA defence. After destroying their Breda guns, the regiment was evacuated to Crete on board HMS Calcutta. Most of the regiment ended the campaign in the defence of Suda Bay in the Battle of Crete, becoming prisoners of war in the process. It was placed in suspended animation in July the same year, with many of its men going to reinforce the 102nd (Northumberland Hussars) Regiment RA, which were being strengthened and re-equipped after being evacuated from Greece and Crete.

==== 149th (Lancashire Hussars) Regiment, RHA ====
The regiment was converted to a field regiment on 1 June 1940. It was sent to Egypt in March 1941 and arrived there on 20 June 1941. It was converted to 149th Anti-Tank Regiment on 1 July 1941 at Mena Camp with 432nd, 433rd, ‘X’/432nd, and ‘Z’/433rd Batteries and 36 2-pounders. It was under command of BTE from July to November 1941. It entered Tobruk in November 1941 and fought at El Duda during the breakout through 9 December. It then served with 8th Army in the desert until 12 July 1942. In January 1942, Z/433rd Battery was retitled 513th Anti-Tank Battery. The regiment was converted to a field regiment on 30 May 1942 and X/432nd Battery was interspersed throughout the regiment. It was reconverted to an anti-tank regiment on 4 July 1942. It came under command of 5th Indian Infantry Division in Egypt from 12 July until 9 September 1942. ‘S’ Anti-Tank Battery joined on 24 September 1942. The regiment served under command of 4th Indian Infantry Division from 9 September 1942 until 31 August 1945. It was in North Africa until 8 September 1943, in Palestine until 16 October 1943, in Syria until 9 November 1943, in Egypt until 2 December 1943, at sea until 9 December 1943, in Italy until 10 December 1944 and then Greece.

‘S’ Battery was numbered 318th on 1 May 1943 and 320th Battery joined on being formed on 10 May 1943. 318th Battery left on 26 May 1943.

=== Postwar ===
When the TA was re-formed in 1947, the regiment was renamed the 306th (Lancashire Hussars) Heavy Anti-Aircraft Regiment, RA, before being amalgamated with the 390th (King's Own) LAA Regiment, RA in 1950.

Later, in 1956, it became 'P' (Lancashire Hussars) Battery of 287th (1st West Lancashire) Medium Regiment, RA and, by 1967, it was just 'A' Troop (Lancashire Hussars), P (1st West Lancashire) Battery, The West Lancashire Regiment, RA (Territorial). In 1969, the regiment was reduced to a cadre (absorbed into 208 (3rd West Lancashire) Battery of 103 (Lancashire Artillery Volunteers) Regiment Royal Artillery in 1973) and the Yeomanry lineage discontinued.

== See also ==
- Imperial Yeomanry
- List of Yeomanry Regiments 1908
- Yeomanry
- Yeomanry order of precedence
- British yeomanry during the First World War
- Second line yeomanry regiments of the British Army
- List of British Army Yeomanry Regiments converted to Royal Artillery

== Bibliography ==
- Arthur, Douglas (2000). Desert Watch: A Story of the Battle of Beda Fomm. Bedale: Blaisdon Publishing. ISBN 978-1-902838-01-4.
- Arthur, Douglas (2003). Forty men – Eight horses. Cambridge: Vanguard Press. ISBN 978-1-84386-070-9.
- James, Brigadier E.A. (1978). British Regiments 1914–18. London: Samson Books Limited. ISBN 0-906304-03-2.
- Joslen, H. F. (2003) [1960]. Orders of Battle: Second World War, 1939–1945. Uckfield, East Sussex: Naval and Military Press. ISBN 978-1-84342-474-1.
- Norman E.H. Litchfield, The Territorial Artillery 1908–1988 (Their Lineage, Uniforms and Badges), Nottingham: Sherwood Press, 1992, ISBN 0-9508205-2-0.
- Mileham, Patrick (1994). The Yeomanry Regiments; 200 Years of Tradition. Edinburgh: Canongate Academic. ISBN 1-898410-36-4.
- Rinaldi, Richard A (2008). Order of Battle of the British Army 1914. Ravi Rikhye. ISBN 978-0-9776072-8-0.
- Titles and Designations of Formations and Units of the Territorial Army, London: War Office, 7 November 1927 (RA sections also summarised in Litchfield, Appendix IV).
