= East Riding of Yorkshire Yeomanry =

British Army military unit

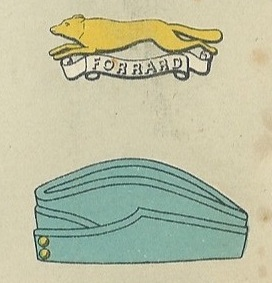
- Badge and service cap as worn at the outbreak of the Second World War
- Active: 1745–1746; 1794–1814; 1902–1956
- Country: Kingdom of Great Britain (1794–1800); United Kingdom (1801–1956)
- Branch: British Army
- Type: Yeomanry
- Size: 1–3 Regiments
- Nickname: Wenlock's Horse
- Motto: Forrard
- Engagements: The Great War; Selle; Valenciennes; Sambre; France and Flanders 1918; Egypt 1915-17; Gaza; El Mughar; Nebi Samwil; Palestine 1917–18; The Second World War; Withdrawal to Escaut; St Omer-La Bassée; Cassel; Normandy Landing; Cambes; Caen; Bourguebus Ridge; La Vie Crossing; Lisieux; Foret de Bretonne; Lower Maas; Venlo Pocket; Ourthe; Rhine; North West Europe 1940, 1944 45; Pegasus Bridge

Commanders
- Notable commanders: 3rd Lord Wenlock; Col Hon Guy Greville Wilson, CMG, DSO, TD

The East Riding of Yorkshire Yeomanry was a unit of the British Army formed in 1902. Units of Yeomanry Cavalry were raised in the East Riding of Yorkshire in the 18th and early 19th centuries at times of national emergency: the Jacobite Rising of 1745, the French Revolutionary Wars and the Napoleonic Wars. These were stood down once each emergency was over. The East Riding of Yorkshire Yeomanry, was established in 1902, and this saw action during the First World War both in the mounted role and as machine gunners.

It was converted to an armoured regiment in 1920, and fought in the Battle of France and the campaign in North West Europe during the Second World War, while some of its personnel served as paratroopers in the Normandy landings and the Rhine Crossing. In 1956, it merged with two other Yorkshire yeomanry regiments to form the Queen's Own Yorkshire Yeomanry. Its lineage is continued today by the Queen's Own Yeomanry.

== Precursor unit ==
A number of companies of Volunteer infantry and artillery were formed in Hull and the East Riding of Yorkshire for coast defence during the Jacobite Rising of 1745. At the same time John Hall-Stevenson and 'a number of fox-hunting gentlemen and yeomen of the county', formed themselves into a cavalry unit named the Yorkshire Light Horse. They invited Major-General James Oglethorpe to be their colonel, and he obtained the King's permission to change its title to the Royal Regiment of Hunters. It is claimed that this was the first unit of Yeomanry cavalry formed in Britain. The unit of foxhunters did some useful patrol work, and participated in Oglethorpe's winter pursuit of the rebel retreat to Shap and the Clifton Moor Skirmish, when its strength was reported to be up to 1500 well-mounted men.

== French Revolutionary and Napoleonic Wars ==
After Britain was drawn into the French Revolutionary Wars, Prime Minister William Pitt the Younger proposed on 14 March 1794 that the counties should form a force of Volunteer Yeoman Cavalry that could be called on by the King to defend the country against invasion or by the Lord Lieutenant to subdue any civil disorder within the county. By the end of the year, 27 counties had raised Yeomanry, including East Yorkshire. Thomas Grimston of Grimston offered to raise a cavalry force in Holderness. He issued 'Articles of Enlistment' based on those of the Northamptonshire Yeomanry, and then travelled round the Holderness villages explaining his plans to the yeomen farmers. Their response was poor, even when Grimston got the local clergy to explain the plan to their parishioners. The main complaint was the low level of pay for attending drills, and unwillingness to turn out during harvest time. They were also unwilling to serve outside the East Riding, and Grimston changed the proposed name of his unit from 'East York' to 'East Riding' (formally the East Riding Gentlemen and Yeomanry Cavalry). Once these concerns were addressed, Grimston was able to recruit his troop up to a strength of 58 men (against an establishment of 60) by September. He set about recruiting an ex-cavalryman to serve as troop sergeant to train the men, and obtaining uniforms and weapons. A similar Troop was raised by Captain William Hall as the Hull Gentleman and Yeomanry Cavalry. In February 1798 Captain Sir Christopher Sykes, 2nd Baronet, raised another Troop of 45 volunteers drawn from 16 parishes around Sledmere as the Yorkshire Wold Gentlemen and Yeomanry Cavalry.

Meanwhile, the attempted French landing in South Wales in 1796 (the Battle of Fishguard) led the government to double the strength of the militia with a new supplementary militia including units of Provisional Cavalry. Unlike the Yeomanry, service in these units was not voluntary, but decided by ballot, one horse-owner in every ten being selected to serve or provide a fully equipped trooper. The East York Provisional Cavalry consisted of troops based at Hull, Beverley, Driffield, Bridlington and Hunmanby under the command of the Lord Lieutenant (the Duke of Leeds). The force was extremely unpopular, and was never embodied, though called out occasionally for training. It was disbanded in March 1799.

The preliminaries to the 1801 Treaty of Amiens saw most of the Yeomanry disbanded, but the peace was short-lived, and Britain declared war on France again in May 1803, beginning the Napoleonic Wars. Captain Thomas Grimston quickly reformed his unit, now titled the Grimston Yeomanry Cavalry and consisting of two Troops. Similarly, Sir Mark Masterman-Sykes, 3rd Baronet, reformed his father's Yorkshire Wolds Yeomanry Cavalry, now with 300 members and himself ranked as lieutenant-colonel. Captain Marmaduke Constable-Maxwell of Everingham formed a new troop of 45 men as the Everingham Yeomanry Cavalry. Captain William Hall offered to reform the Hull Yeomanry Cavalry, but the offer was not acknowledged by the Lord Lieutenant and he withdrew the offer; no new cavalry unit was raised in Hull for the rest of the war. In 1808 a new Local Militia was formed, which replaced many of the Volunteer units. The Yorkshire Wolds Yeomanry Cavalry transferred to the new force, but the Grimston and Everingham Troops remained independent voluntary units until they were disbanded at the end of the war in 1814.

For the rest of the 19th century, there was no Yeomanry regiment in the East Riding: men who wished to serve could join the North Riding-based Yorkshire Hussars, which maintained detachments in Beverley and other East Yorkshire towns in the second half of the century.

== Imperial Yeomanry ==
Following a string of defeats during Black Week in early December 1899, the British government realised that it would need more troops than just the regular army to fight the Second Boer War. On 13 December, the decision to allow volunteer forces to serve in the field was made, and a Royal Warrant was issued on 24 December. This officially created the Imperial Yeomanry (IY). The force was organised as county service companies of approximately 115 men, and volunteers (usually middle and upper class) quickly filled the new force, which was equipped to operate as mounted infantry. The Yorkshire Hussars raised the 9th (Yorkshire (Doncaster)) Company and (with the Yorkshire Dragoons) the 66th (Yorkshire) Company for the first contingent. The 9th was replaced by the 109th (Yorkshire Hussars) Company in 1901.

The concept was considered a success and before the war ended the existing Yeomanry regiments at home were converted into Imperial Yeomanry, and new regiments raised, including the East Riding of Yorkshire Imperial Yeomanry, which was approved on 15 April 1902.

The unit was raised by Beilby Lawley, 3rd Baron Wenlock, honorary colonel of the 2nd East Riding Royal Garrison Artillery (Volunteers) and a former captain in the Yorkshire Hussars, who was appointed lieutenant-colonel on 15 May. His second-in-command was retired Major John Stracey-Clitherow, who had served in the Anglo-Egyptian War. By 1903 the new regiment had 400 men, in four squadrons at Hull, Beverley, York and Bridlington, and a Machine Gun Section.

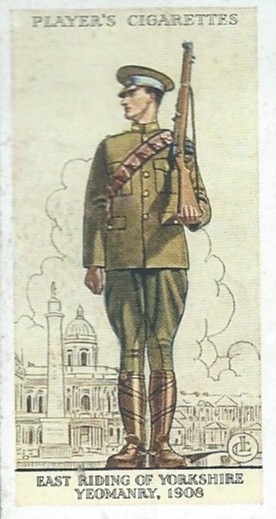
Uniform of the East Riding of Yorkshire Yeomanry 1908

A Squadron was based at the riding school in Walton Street, Hull. In 1911, this site was included in a new drill hall on Anlaby Road, Hull, which was shared with the 2nd Northumbrian Brigade, Royal Field Artillery (former 2nd East Yorks RGA) and named Wenlock Barracks after Lord Wenlock, who was Hon Colonel of both units. The Yeomanry regiment was popularly known as 'Wenlock's Horse'. It became a lancer regiment, with the appropriate uniform, in 1906.

== Territorial Force ==
The Imperial Yeomanry were subsumed into the new Territorial Force (TF) under the Haldane Reforms of 1908. The East Riding Yeomanry (TF) formed part of the TF's Yorkshire Mounted Brigade. At this time the regiment was organised as follows:

- Regimental headquarters (RHQ) at Railway Street, Beverley
- A Squadron at Hull
- B Squadron at Beverley, with detachments at North Cave, Hornsea and Patrington
- C Squadron at Fulford with a detachment at Dunnington
- D Squadron at Driffield with detachments at Hunmanby, Pocklington, Settrington and Bridlington

== First World War ==
=== Mobilisation ===
The East Riding Yeomanry were mobilised on the outbreak of war on 4 August 1914 under the command of Lt-Col Philip Langdale of Houghton Hall, Yorkshire, who had taken command on 6 June 1912. Under the Territorial and Reserve Forces Act 1907 (7 Edw. 7, c.9), which brought the TF into being, it was intended to be a home defence force for service during wartime and members could not be compelled to serve outside the country. However, after the outbreak of war, TF units were invited to volunteer for 'Imperial Service'. On 15 August 1914, the War Office issued instructions to separate those men who had signed up for Home Service only, and form these into reserve units. On 31 August, the formation of a reserve or 2nd Line unit was authorised for each 1st Line unit where 60 per cent or more of the men had volunteered for Overseas Service. The titles of these 2nd Line units would be the same as the original, but distinguished by a '2/' prefix. In this way, duplicate regiments, brigades and divisions were created, mirroring those TF formations being sent overseas. Later, a 3rd Line was formed to act as a reserve, providing trained replacements for the 1st and 2nd Line regiments.

=== 1/1st East Riding of Yorkshire Yeomanry ===
The 1/1st moved north in November 1914 as Divisional Cavalry for the 2nd Northumbrian Division. On 20 May, the regiment formed part of a parade of some 40,000 men before H.M. The King and Lord Kitchener. The regiment was then ordered south to Filey and then to East Anglia, to form part of the 1/1st North Midland Mounted Brigade (later numbered as the 22nd Mounted Brigade). In October 1915, it set sail for Alexandria.

In 1916, the regiment was part of the Western Frontier Force, a dreary job, causing a number of NCOs and men to join the newly formed Imperial Camel Corps and 120 officers and men to be detached for service under T. E. Lawrence. In December 1916, the 22nd Mounted Brigade moved to the Suez Canal Zone to form part of the ANZAC Mounted Division. The regiment first saw action during the First Battle of Gaza, a hard engagement for both the men and the horses, and in the Second Battle of Gaza it was posted to the far right flank. In General Allenby's reorganisation 22nd Mounted Brigade transferred to the Yeomanry Mounted Division.

In October 1917, the regiment took part in the Third Battle of Gaza, and on 13 November at El Mughar, supported a charge by 6th Mounted Brigade. 'A' Squadron, commanded by Maj. J.F.M. Robinson M.C., led 22nd Mounted Brigade, having captured their objective, they pressed on to Akir and established a position on the far side of the village square; however, they had to withdraw as they were unsupported by the rest of the brigade. Sadly, it transpired that the village was the location of a Turkish Corps Headquarters, and had the success of the attack been exploited then a major dislocation of the enemy lines could have resulted. El Mughar was the last great cavalry charge of the British Army.

In December 1917, with the exception of the machine gun section, the regiment was dismounted and sent to France. From 7 April 1918, together with the Lincolnshire Yeomanry, it formed 'D' Bn, Machine Gun Corps (Mobile), redesignated 102nd Bn from 19 August.

=== 2/1st East Riding of Yorkshire Yeomanry ===
The 2nd Line regiment was formed in September 1914. In 1915 it was under the command of the 2/1st Yorkshire Mounted Brigade in Yorkshire (along with the 2/1st Yorkshire Hussars and the 2/1st Queen's Own Yorkshire Dragoons) and by March 1916 was in the Beverley area. On 31 March 1916, the remaining Mounted Brigades were numbered in a single sequence and the brigade became 18th Mounted Brigade, still in Yorkshire under Northern Command.

In July 1916, there was a major reorganisation of 2nd Line yeomanry units in the United Kingdom. All but 12 regiments were converted to cyclists and as a consequence the regiment was dismounted and the brigade converted to 11th Cyclist Brigade. Further reorganisation in October and November 1916 saw the brigade redesignated as 7th Cyclist Brigade in November, now in the Bridlington area.

About May 1918, the brigade moved to Ireland and the regiment was stationed at Bandon and Fermoy, County Cork. There were no further changes before the end of the war. The regiment was disbanded at Fermoy on 12 December 1919.

=== 3/1st East Riding of Yorkshire Yeomanry ===
The 3rd Line regiment was formed in 1915; that summer it was affiliated to the 5th Reserve Cavalry Regiment at York. Early in 1917, it was absorbed by the 1st Reserve Cavalry Regiment at The Curragh.

== Between the Wars ==
On 7 February 1920, the regiment was reconstituted in the Territorial Army (TA) with headquarters at Walton Street, Hull. Following the experience of the war, it was decided that only the fourteen most senior yeomanry regiments would be retained as horsed cavalry, with the rest being transferred to other roles. As a result, on 23 August 1920, the regiment was one of eight (Note: The eight yeomanry regiments converted to Armoured Car Companies of the Royal Tank Corps (RTC) were: 19th (Lothians and Border) Armoured Car Company, Royal Tank Corps from Lothians and Border Horse; 20th (Fife and Forfar) Armoured Car Company, Royal Tank Corps from Fife and Forfar Yeomanry; 21st (Gloucestershire Yeomanry) Armoured Car Company, Royal Tank Corps from Royal Gloucestershire Hussars; 22nd (London) Armoured Car Company (Westminster Dragoons), Royal Tank Corps from Westminster Dragoons; 23rd (London) Armoured Car Company, Royal Tank Corps from 3rd County of London Yeomanry (Sharpshooters); 24th (Derbyshire Yeomanry) Armoured Car Company, Royal Tank Corps from Derbyshire Yeomanry; 25th (Northamptonshire Yeomanry) Armoured Car Company, Royal Tank Corps from Northamptonshire Yeomanry; 26th (East Riding of York Yeomanry) Armoured Car Company, Royal Tank Corps from East Riding Yeomanry) converted and reduced to the 26th (East Riding of York Yeomanry) Armoured Car Company, Tank Corps. The Tank Corps became the Royal Tank Corps on 18 October 1923, and on 4 April 1939 the Royal Tank Regiment in the Royal Armoured Corps (RAC).

By 1939, it had become clear that a new European war was likely to break out, and the doubling of the TA was authorised, with each unit forming a duplicate. On 24 August, the 1st East Riding Yeomanry was reconstituted in the RAC as a Divisional Cavalry Regiment (Mechanised) equipped with 28 light tanks, 44 carriers and 41 motorcycles. At the same time, it formed its duplicate 2nd East Riding Yeomanry.

== Second World War ==
=== 1st East Riding Yeomanry ===
==== Battle of France ====
On 30 March 1940, after training at Tidworth, the 1st Regiment joined the British Expeditionary Force (BEF) in France as part of the 1st Armoured Reconnaissance Brigade, initially the Corps Cavalry to III Corps. However, in May, the regiment passed under the command of 48th (South Midland) Division, 44th (Home Counties) Division, Macforce, and finally back to 48th (South Midland) Division. The regiment was first involved in fighting near Ath, south of Brussels, and then over the next fortnight fought seven rearguard actions before being finally surrounded at Cassel on the night of 29/30 May while acting as rearguard to 145th Infantry Brigade.

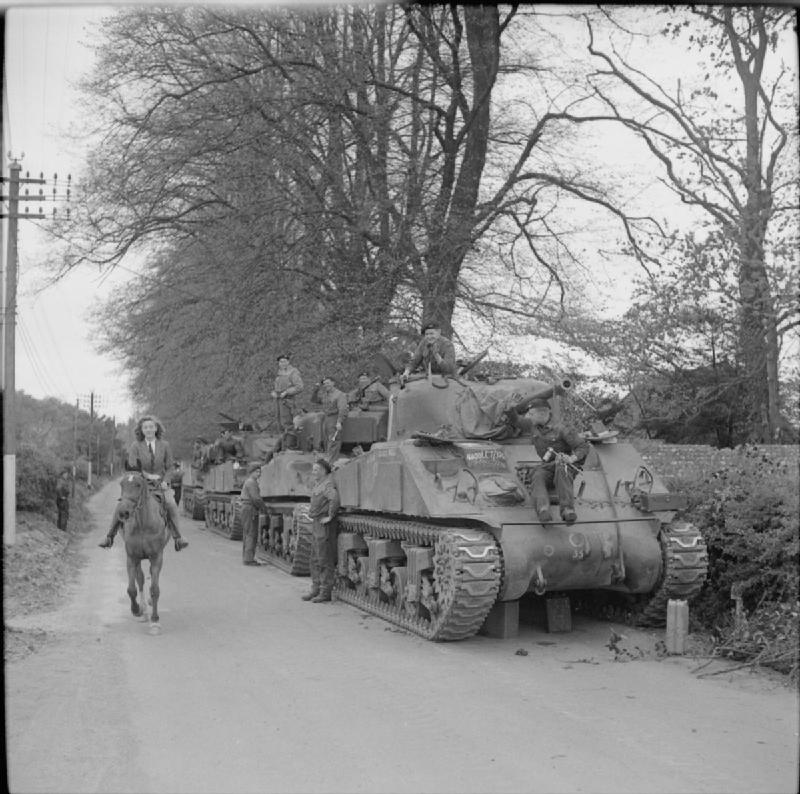
Sherman tanks of 1st ERY parked at the side of a road in England during Exercise Fabius, May 1944.

==== Training ====
The remnants of 1ERY (7 officers and 230 men) returned to Tidworth, where the regiment was brought up to strength by drafts from the 2nd Regiment, before moving on to Bovington to rejoin 1st Armoured Reconnaissance Brigade. The regiment next deployed to Essex for anti-invasion duties, where it was equipped with Beaverettes. When new material became available in spring 1942, the regiment reequipped with Covenanter tanks and Honeys, and together with the 4th/7th Royal Dragoon Guards (replaced by the Staffordshire Yeomanry in January 1944) and the 13th/18th Royal Hussars, it formed 27th Armoured Brigade in 79th Armoured Division ('Hobart's Funnies'), experimenting with specialist assault armour. In April 1943, the regiment again re-equipped, this time with Sherman Duplex Drive tanks. Between 8 October 1943 and 17 February 1944, 1ERY formed part of 33rd Tank Brigade in 49th (West Riding) Infantry Division before returning to the 27th.

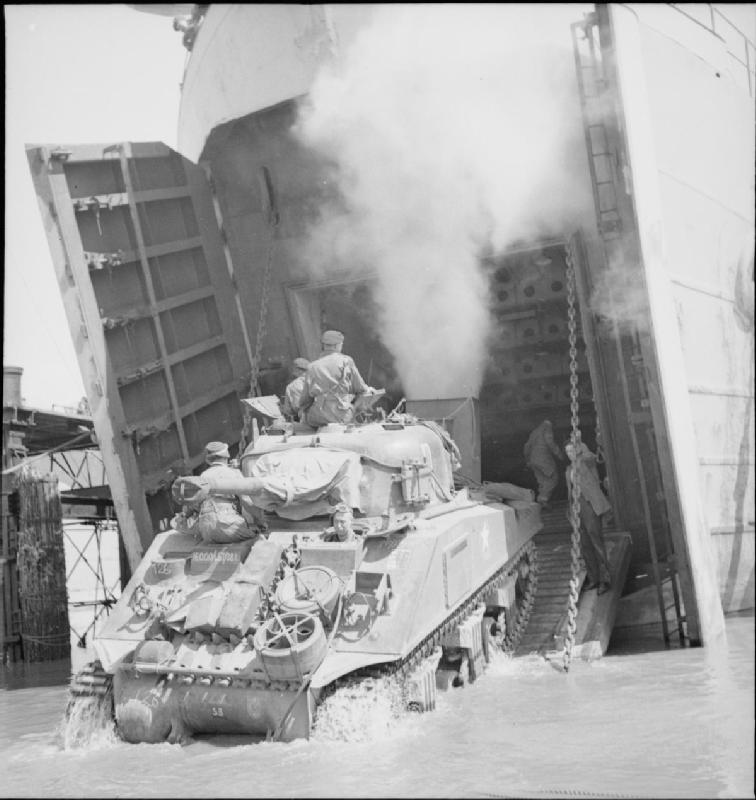
Sherman tank of the 1st ERY being loaded onto an LST at Gosport, 1 June 1944.

==== North West Europe ====
The training all came to fruition on 6 June 1944, when the Regiment landed on Sword Beach on D Day supporting 9th Infantry Brigade in 3rd British Infantry Division, After the failure to seize Caen on D-Day, 3rd Division's task was to capture the high ground north of the town. Next day, 1ERY supported an unsuccessful attack by the 2nd Bn Royal Ulster Rifles on Cambes-en-Plaine, one of the enemy's strongest positions in this part of the front. Two days later, the two units had to advance over 1,000 yards (910 m) of flat, open land under artillery, mortar and machine gun fire. They were supported by four AVREs of 79th Assault Squadron, Royal Engineers, and Sherman Crab flail tanks of A Squadron of the Westminster Dragoons from 79th Armoured Division. The infantry suffered over 200 casualties and 1ERY lost four tanks, while all the AVREs (forced to act as infantry tanks) were knocked out, but after hard fighting the battle group gained their objective.

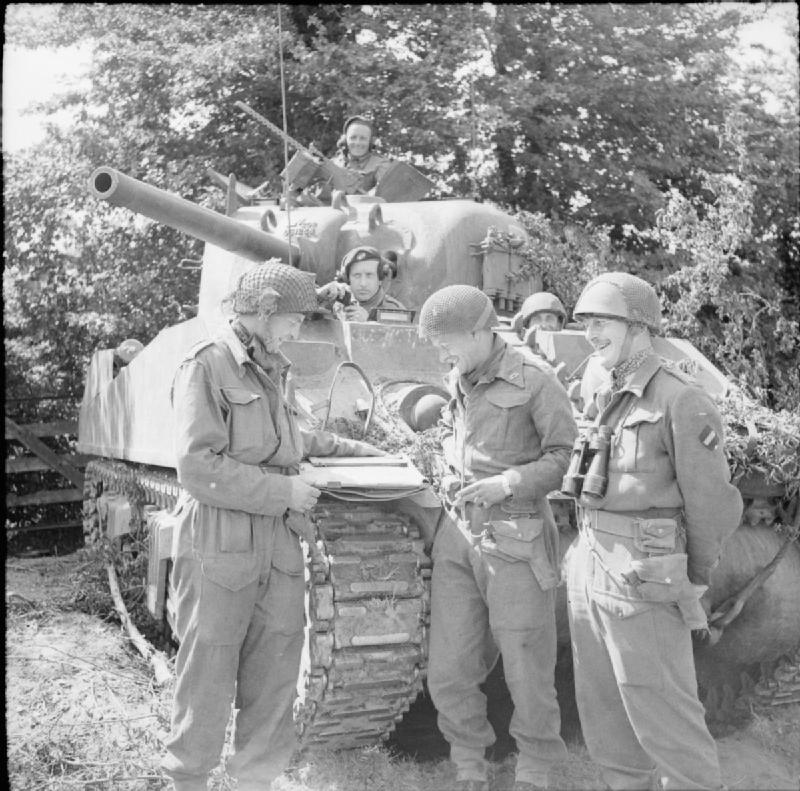
Major W Holtby, commanding 'C' Squadron, East Riding Yeomanry, 27th Armoured Brigade, briefs troop commanders in front of his HQ Sherman tank, 28 June 1944.

For 50 days after the landings, 1ERY took part in the bridgehead battles. During this period, it also supported 59th (Staffordshire) Infantry Division. Because of casualties, 27th Armoured Brigade was broken up on 29 July, and on 16 August 1ERY joined 33rd Armoured Brigade, taking over the petrol Mk1 & II Shermans of 148 Regt RAC. The regiment was now attached to 51st (Highland) Infantry Division, for the final Falaise Pocket Battles, the advance to the River Seine, its crossing and the taking of St Valery-en-Caux; after which the regiment transferred to 49th (West Riding) Division for the Battle of Le Havre.

In October, the regiment supported 53rd (Welsh) Infantry Division, in the Netherlands fighting around 's-Hertogenbosch and the later crossing of the Meuse (Dutch: Maas). However, during the Battle of the Bulge in the winter of 1944, it was hurried away to reinforce the pressure being put on the German "Bulge".

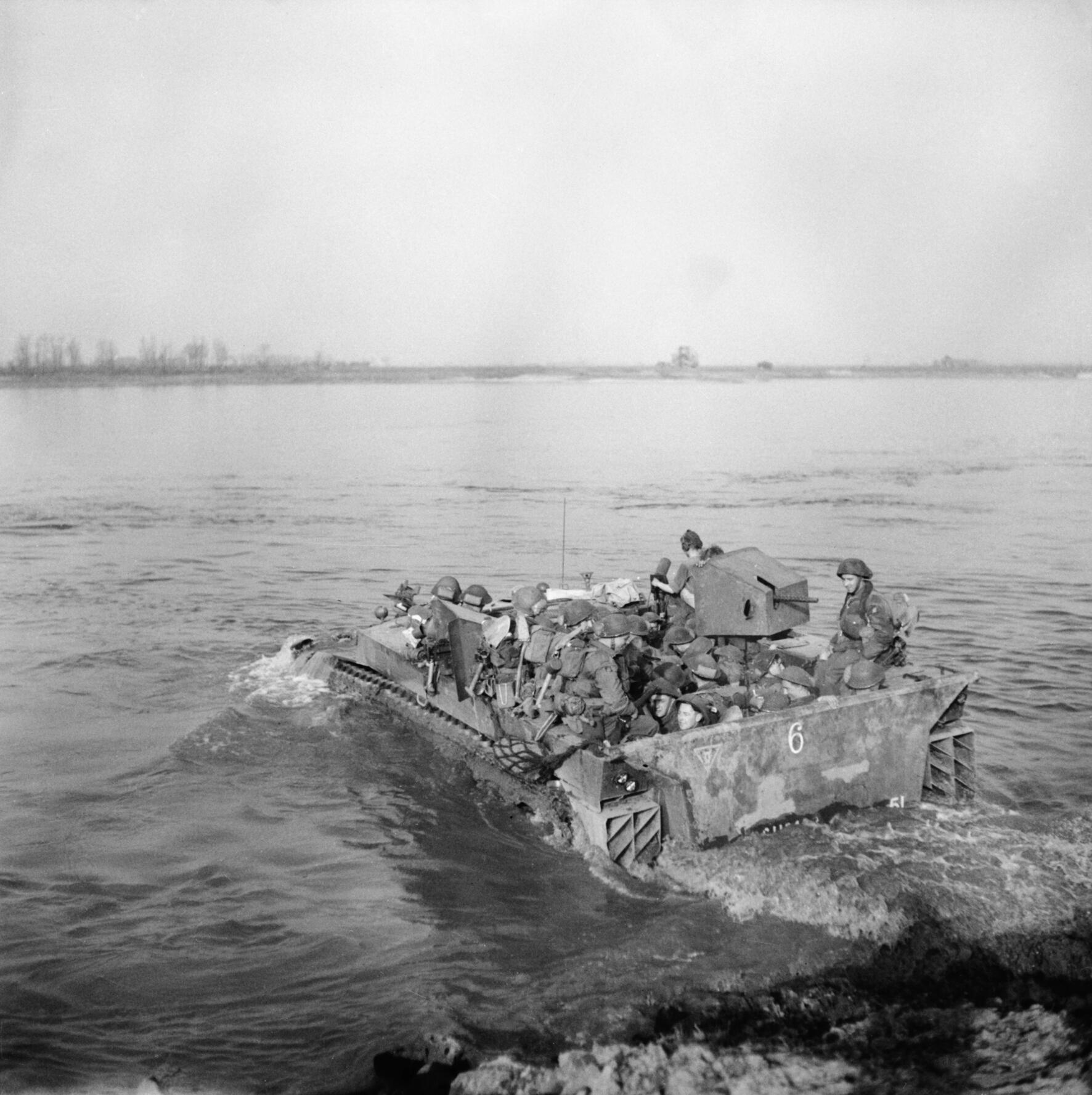
Infantry cross the Rhine aboard a Buffalo, 28 March 1945

==== Rhine crossing ====
In January, 1ERY and 33rd Armd Bde rejoined 79th Armoured Division and re-equipped with Buffalo amphibious vehicles for the assault crossing of the Rhine (Operation Plunder) on 23/24 March. Captain Peter Clemence of 1ERY was responsible for lighting the routes to the Buffaloes were to take to the water. This involved daylight reconnaissance of the riverbank under enemy fire as well as placing the lights under fire on the night of the operation. Clemence was awarded the Military Cross (MC). 1ERY's role in the operation was to carry the assault troops of 227th (Highland) Brigade, 15th (Scottish) Infantry Division, with one troop of six Buffaloes allocated to each assaulting infantry company and two troops to each battalion for essential equipment such as 6-pounder anti-tank guns, wireless carriers and medical jeeps. The operation was practised behind the lines on the Meuse (Dutch: Maas), during which one of the ERY Buffaloes overturned and its driver and co-driver were drowned. One participant commented that 'The yeomanry responsible for the actual crossing were delightful lot to work with, with a fine cavalry dash and a persistently horsey outlook, even in the water, when the squadron commanders were heard urging their drivers to "get their whips out".' 15th (S) Division's assault (Operation Torchlight) began at 02.00 on 24 March, and at first things went well for 1ERY and 227 Bde: two companies of 10th Bn Highland Light Infantry and three of 2nd Bn Argyll and Sutherland Highlanders crossed the river without difficulty. Unfortunately, the Buffaloes carrying A and C Companies of the HLI had got off course in the darkness, and both were landed upstream of their allotted landing zones. A section of riverbank manned by a German parachute battalion remained uncleared, and B and C Companies, following up, were also landed in the wrong place. By dint of hard fighting and heavy artillery support, the HLI cleared up the confusion by 09.00, allowing the transport to begin landing. On the Argylls' front, five out of six Buffaloes assigned to D Company were unable to climb the riverbank, and had to land their passengers some way away. D Company had to fight their way for a mile round before they could join in the fight for their objective. However, the Argylls were reinforced and got the job done. Acting Lance-Corporal Adams of 1EYR was the driver of his Troop Commander's Buffalo; having returned from the far bank with a group of wounded and prisoners, they came under shellfire while unloading. Adams shielded one of the stretcher cases from shrapnel with his own body, while the Buffalo was badly holed and some of the German prisoners were killed. Adams was awarded the Military Medal (MM). Despite operating under fire for four days, the regiment only suffered one man wounded during Operation Plunder.

For the last weeks of the war, the regiment reconverted to Shermans, coming under the command of the First Canadian Army clearing the Netherlands. After the war, the regiment was stationed at Laboe (Kiel Estuary) until being placed in 'suspended animation' on 7 March 1946.

=== 2nd East Riding Yeomanry ===
The 2nd ERY was formed as a Royal Armoured Corps regiment as a duplicate of the 1st Regiment on 24 August 1939. On 25 June 1940, it was converted to infantry as the 10th (East Riding) Battalion, Green Howards. From the start of 1943, it started training as parachutists and, on 1 June, the battalion became the 12th (Yorkshire) Parachute Battalion, of the Parachute Regiment, part of the British Army's airborne forces. The battalion was serving alongside the 7th and 13th Parachute Battalions assigned to the 5th Parachute Brigade, which was part of the 6th Airborne Division. The battalion made combat drops on 6 June 1944 (Operation Overlord) and 28 March 1945 (Operation Varsity). The 'marching' elements of the division were ferried across the Rhine by 1st East Riding Yeomanry and 11th Royal Tank Regiment.

== Postwar ==
The 1st ERY was reformed in the TA on 1 January 1947. In 1951, its title was officially shortened to East Riding Yeomanry (as it had always been commonly known). In 1956, the East Riding Yeomanry was merged with two other yeomanry regiments (the Yorkshire Hussars and the Yorkshire Dragoons) as the Queen's Own Yorkshire Yeomanry, which was formed on 1 April 1967, as a TAVR III unit with the RHQ and 'A' Squadron at York, 'B' Squadron at Doncaster and 'C Squadron at Hull. Then, on 1 April 1969, the regiment was reduced to a cadre and finally reformed on 1 April 1971 as 'A' Squadron The Queen's Own Yeomanry.

12th (Yorkshire) Battalion, Parachute Regiment, was reconstituted in the TA on 1 March 1947. On 1 October 1956 it was amalgamated with 13th (Lancashire) Battalion.

== Uniforms and insignia ==
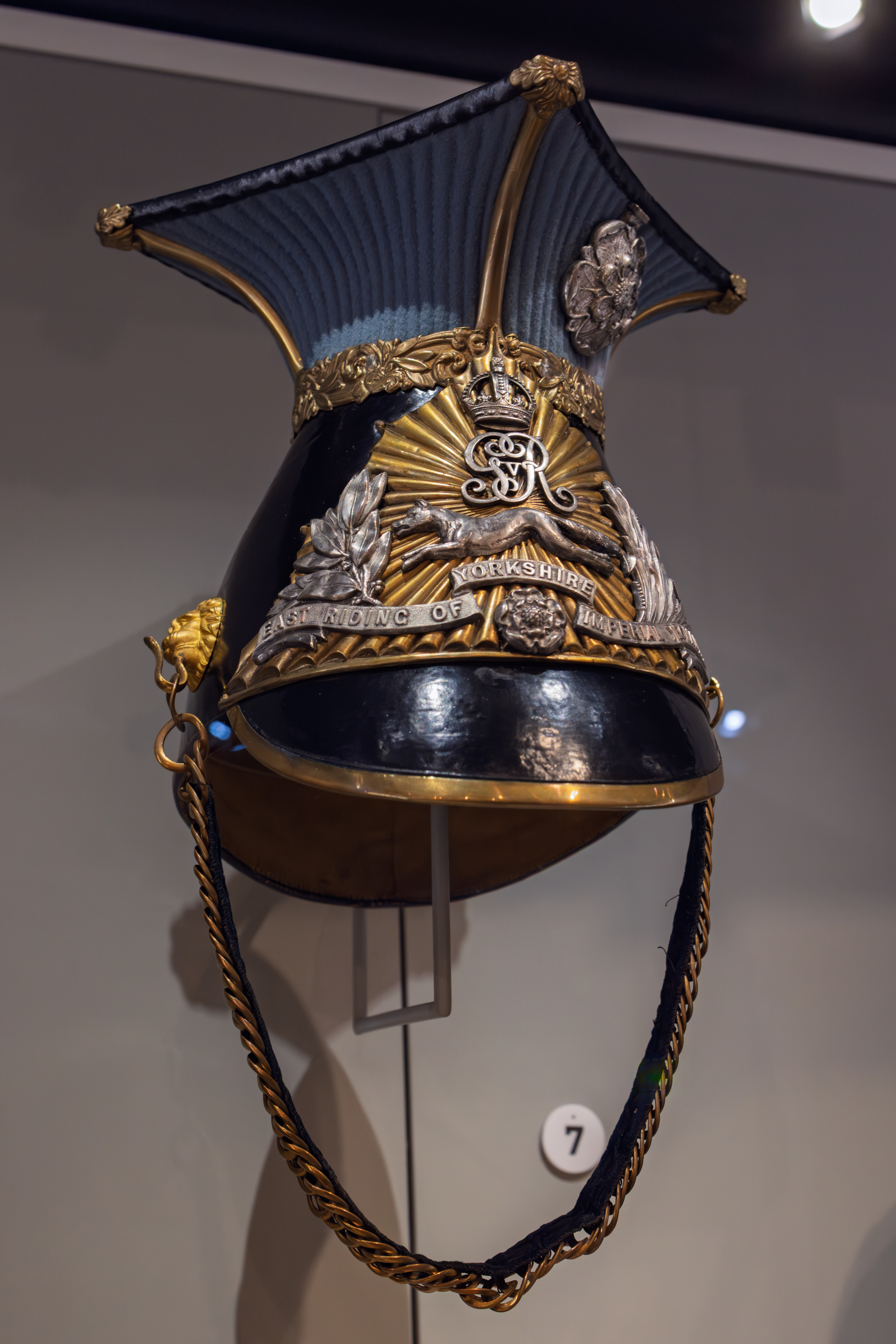
Officers' chapka, c. 1912

Grimston's troop raised in 1794 wore short scarlet Hussar-style jackets with buff facings and silver braid (though Grimston himself wore a blue tunic). A standard Light Dragoon or Yeomanry Tarleton helmet was worn with buff 'turban' and hackle. The whitened leather crossbelt bore a plate engraved with 'E.R.Y.C.' (for East Riding Yeomanry cavalry) surrounded by a scroll bearing the motto Pro aris et focis ('for our altars and hearths', or more colloquially, 'for hearth and home'). The yeomen wore white breeches and black riding boots. The Hull Troop wore a green uniform with green facings and Yeomanry helmet, and the uniform of the Yorkshire Wold Troop is also believed to have been green. The East York Provisional Cavalry wore a green uniform with red facings.

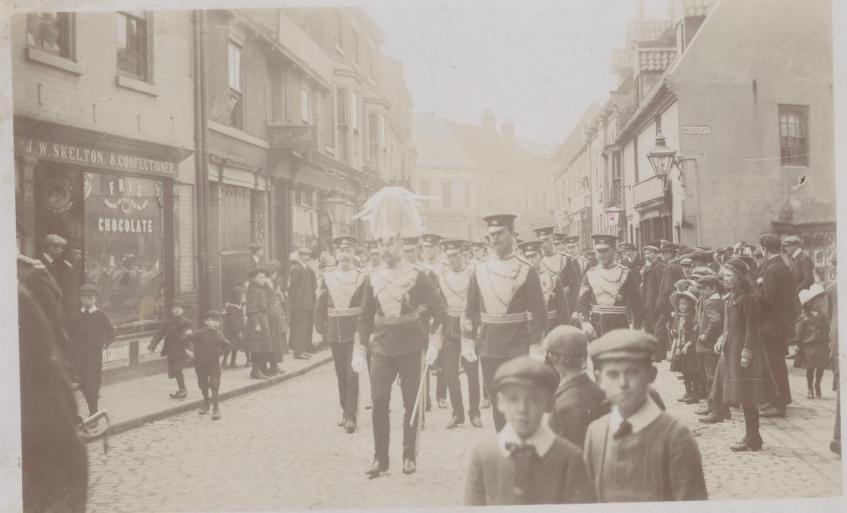
The East Riding Yeomanry marching along Toll Gavel, Beverley, ca 1910.

When the Grimston Yeomanry were reformed in 1803, they continued to wear the scarlet uniform with buff facings and silver braid, but now with scarlet pantaloons. The reformed Yorkshire Wold Troop now wore scarlet with green facings. The Everingham Troop adopted scarlet with yellow facings and white pantaloons.

The East Riding of Yorkshire Imperial Yeomanry wore serge khaki uniforms in drill order, with staff cap and brown equipment. The walking out dress comprised a Slouch hat and a serge tunic with blue plastron front, shoulder straps and waistbelt. After it became a lancer unit, it adopted full dress uniform with a Chapka lance cap, the upper part covered in French grey (light blue/grey) cloth, and a tunic of maroon cloth (an unusual colour for the British Army) with French grey plastron, shoulder straps and cuffs. Overalls (tight cavalry breeches) were of dark blue with broad French grey stripes. The unit adopted as its badge a running fox and the motto 'Forrard' in recognition of its foxhunting heritage.

== Honorary colonels ==
The following served as honorary colonel of the unit:

- Marmaduke Constable-Maxwell, 11th Lord Herries of Terregles, Lord Lieutenant of the East Riding, appointed 14 February 1903, died 5 October 1908
- Beilby Lawley, 3rd Baron Wenlock, GCSI, GCIE, KCB, VD, former CO, appointed 6 October 1908, died 15 January 1912
- Lt-Col J.B. Stracey-Clitherow, CBE TD, former CO, appointed 6 June 1912
- Col Hon Guy Greville Wilson, CMG, DSO, TD, CO of 1/1st EYR during World War I, appointed 2 January 1932, died 1 February 1943.
- Brigadier Raleigh Chichester-Constable, DSO, appointed 29 July 1947.
- Col William Douglas Baird Thompson, DSO, MC, TD, DL, appointed 21 December 1955, to 1956

== Memorials ==
There is a pair of identical carved stone memorial tablets in Beverley Minster to the casualties of the First World War and Second World War. The former Museum of Army Transport at Beverley held a pair of wooden boards listing the regiment's battle honours for the First World War and the Second World War, and another pair listing members of the regiment awarded honours and medals with the BEF in the Battle of France (18 names) and in North West Europe (55 names, of whom 2 died). Many items from the museum were transferred to the National Army Museum.

== Museum ==
A display of East Riding Yeomanry militaria, collected by Neil Hutty, opened to the public in May 2025 at Burton Constable Hall, near Skirlaugh in the East Riding. Burton Constable Hall is an historic Grade I listed Elizabethan house, home to the Constable family for over 700 years (including Brigadier Raleigh Chichester-Constable), the collection illustrates the history of the East Riding Yeomanry, known as 'Wenlock's Horse' after the founder, Lord Wenlock, from its formation in 1902 until amalgamation in 1956.

== See also ==
- Imperial Yeomanry
- List of Yeomanry Regiments 1908
- Yeomanry order of precedence
- British yeomanry during the First World War
- Second line yeomanry regiments of the British Army

== Bibliography ==
- Becke, Maj A. F. History of the Great War: Order of Battle of Divisions, Part 2a: The Territorial Force Mounted Divisions and the 1st-Line Territorial Force Divisions (42–56), London: HM Stationery Office, 1935/Uckfield: Naval & Military Press, 2007, ISBN 978-1-917666-05-3
- Burke's Peerage, Baronetage and Knightage, 100th Edn, London, 1953.
- Doherty, Richard, Hobart's 79th Armoured Division at War: Invention, Innovation and Inspiration, Barnsley: Pen & Sword, 2011, ISBN 978-1-84884-398-1.
- Dunlop, Col John K. The Development of the British Army 1899–1914, London: Methuen, 1938.
- James, Brigadier E. A. (1978). British Regiments 1914–18. London: Samson Books Limited. ISBN 0-906304-03-2.
- Ellis, Major L. F. History of the Second World War, United Kingdom Military Series: Victory in the West, Vol I: The Battle of Normandy, London: HM Stationery Office, 1962/Uckfield: Naval & Military, 2004, ISBN 1-845740-58-0.
- Frederick, J. B. M. Lineage Book of British Land Forces 1660–1978, Vol I, Wakefield, Microform Academic, 1984, ISBN 1-85117-007-3.
- Joslen, H. F. (2003) [1960]. Orders of Battle: Second World War, 1939–1945. Uckfield, East Sussex: Naval and Military Press. ISBN 978-1-84342-474-1.
- Mileham, Patrick (1994). The Yeomanry Regiments; 200 Years of Tradition. Edinburgh: Canongate Academic. ISBN 1-898410-36-4.
- Martin, Lt-Gen H. G. The History of the Fifteenth Scottish Division 1939–1945, Edinburgh: Blackwood, 1948/Uckfield: Naval & Military Press, 2014, ISBN 978-1-78331-085-2.
- Norfolk, R. W. S. Militia, Yeomanry and Volunteer Forces of the East Riding 1689–1908, York: East Yorkshire Local History Society, 1965.
- North, René Military Uniforms 1686–1918, London: Hamlyn, 1970, ISBN 0-600-00118-0.
- Nutty, Neil (2025). The History of the East Riding Yeomanry: Volume 3: Yeomen Forrard! : The East Riding Yeomanry from D-Day to Victory during the Second World War, 1943-1956. London: Leonaur. ISBN 978-1-917666-04-6.
- Rinaldi, Richard A. (2008). Order of Battle of the British Army 1914. Ravi Rikhye. ISBN 978-0-97760728-0.
- Rogers, Col H. C. B. The Mounted Troops of the British Army 1066–1945, London: Seeley Service, 1959.
- Saunders, Tim , Operation Plunder: The British and Canadian Rhine Crossing, Barnsley: Pen & Sword Books, 2006, ISBN 1-84415-221-9.
- Edward M. Spiers, The Army and Society 1815–1914, London: Longmans, 1980, ISBN 0-582-48565-7.
- Wright, Robert A Memoir of General James Oglethorpe, one of the Earliest Reformers of Prison Discipline in England, and the Founder of Georgia, in America, London: Chapman & Hall, 1867.]

=== External links ===
- Anglo Boer War
- Mark Conrad, The British Army, 1914 (archive site)
- British Army units from 1945 on
- Imperial War Museum, War Memorials Register
- The Long, Long Trail
- Land Forces of Britain, the Empire and Commonwealth – Regiments.org (archive site)
- The Regimental Warpath 1914–1918 (archive site)
