= 10th Cyclist Brigade =

2/1st Western Mounted Brigade 21st Mounted Brigade 14th Cyclist Brigade 10th Cyclist Brigade
- Active: 1915–1918
- Country: United Kingdom
- Branch: British Army
- Type: Yeomanry; Bicycle infantry
- Size: Brigade
- Service: World War I

The 21st Mounted Brigade previously known as the 2/1st Western Mounted Brigade was a 2nd Line yeomanry brigade of the British Army during the First World War. In July 1916 it was converted to a cyclist formation as 14th Cyclist Brigade and in October 1916 was redesignated as 10th Cyclist Brigade. It was still in existence, in Ireland, at the end of the war.

== Mounted Brigade ==
In accordance with the Territorial and Reserve Forces Act 1907 (7 Edw.7, c.9) which brought the Territorial Force into being, the TF was intended to be a home defence force for service during wartime and members could not be compelled to serve outside the country. However, on the outbreak of war on 4 August 1914, many members volunteered for Imperial Service. Therefore, TF units were split in August and September 1914 into 1st Line (liable for overseas service) and 2nd Line (home service for those unable or unwilling to serve overseas) units. Later, a 3rd Line was formed to act as a reserve, providing trained replacements for the 1st and 2nd Line regiments. Similarly, by 1915 most 2nd Line yeomanry regiments were formed into 2nd Line mounted brigades with the same title and composition as the pre-war 1st Line formations. Two other 2nd Line brigades (2/1st Southern Mounted Brigade and 2/1st Western Mounted Brigade) without 1st Line antecedents were also formed.

The 2/1st Western Mounted Brigade was formed by July 1915, possibly by the redesignation of the Yorkshire Mounted Brigade. It had under command the 2/1st Duke of Lancaster's Own Yeomanry, the 2/1st Westmorland and Cumberland Yeomanry and the 2/1st Lancashire Hussars. By March 1916, the brigade was at Cupar, Fife. On 31 March 1916, the remaining Mounted Brigades were ordered to be numbered in a single sequence and the brigade became 21st Mounted Brigade, still at Cupar under Scottish Command.

In May 1916, 2/B Battery, Honourable Artillery Company (four Ordnance BLC 15-pounders) moved to Cupar where it joined the brigade.

== Cyclist Brigade ==
In July 1916 there was a major reorganization of 2nd Line yeomanry units in the United Kingdom. All but 12 regiments were converted to cyclists and as a consequence the brigade was converted to 14th Cyclist Brigade. Further reorganization in October and November 1916 saw the brigade redesignated as 10th Cyclist Brigade in October 1916, still at Cupar.

2/B Battery, HAC left on 10 May 1917 and proceeded to Heytesbury, Wiltshire where it joined the reformed CXXVI Brigade, RFA. (Note: The original CLVIII Brigade, RFA was formed from November 1914 as an 18 pounder gun brigade for the original 32nd Division in Kitchener's Fourth New Army. The divisions of the Fourth New Army were broken up on 10 April 1915 and the brigade was transferred to the 37th Division. It joined the division on 15 April as a 4.5" howitzer brigade and proceeded to France with the division at the end of July 1915. It served with the division on the Western Front until 28 January 1917 when it was broken up.) 2/1st Lancashire Hussars moved to St Andrews in July 1917.

By January 1918, 10th Cyclist Brigade had moved to Lincolnshire with the 2/1st Duke of Lancaster's at Alford and Skegness, the 2/1st Westmoreland and Cumberland at Spilsby and Burgh-le-Marsh, and the 2/1st Lancashire Hussars also at Skegness.

About May 1918 the Brigade moved to Ireland. 2/1st Duke of Lancaster's was stationed at Tralee, County Kerry, the 2/1st Westmoreland and Cumberland at Buttevant and Charleville, County Cork, and the 2/1st Lancashire Hussars at Bandon and Buttevant, County Cork. There were no further changes before the end of the war.

== See also ==
- British yeomanry during the First World War
- Second line yeomanry regiments of the British Army

== Bibliography ==
- Becke, Archibald F. (1936). Order of Battle of Divisions Part 2A. The Territorial Force Mounted Divisions and the 1st-Line Territorial Force Divisions (42–56). London: HMSO. OCLC 4405016.
- Becke, Archibald F. (1945). Order of Battle of Divisions Part 3B. New Army Divisions (30-41) & 63rd (R.N.) Division. London: HMSO. OCLC 4405016.
- James, Brigadier E.A. (1978). British Regiments 1914–18. London: Samson Books Limited. ISBN 0-906304-03-2.
- Rinaldi, Richard A (2008). Order of Battle of the British Army 1914. Ravi Rikhye. ISBN 978-0-97760728-0.
