= Cavalry Reserve Regiments =

Seventeen Cavalry Reserve Regiments were formed by the British Army on the outbreak of the Great War in August 1914. These were affiliated with one or more active cavalry regiments, their purpose being to train replacement drafts for the active regiments. In 1915, the 3rd Line (Note: In accordance with the Territorial and Reserve Forces Act 1907 (7 Edw. 7, c.9) which brought the Territorial Force into being, the TF was intended to be a home defence force for service during wartime and members could not be compelled to serve outside the country. However, on the outbreak of war on 4 August 1914, many members volunteered for Imperial Service. Therefore, TF units were split in August and September 1914 into 1st Line (liable for overseas service) and 2nd Line (home service for those unable or unwilling to serve overseas) units. Later, a 3rd Line was formed to act as a reserve, providing trained replacements for the 1st and 2nd Line regiments.) regiments of the Yeomanry were also affiliated with the Cavalry Reserve and, in September 1916, the Household Cavalry Reserve Regiment was formed in Windsor, supplying replacements to the dismounted Household Battalion. In 1917, the regiments underwent major reorganization, being reduced to ten in number.

Although nominally cavalry, many of the drafts ended up being converted into infantry in order to satisfy the manpower demands of trench warfare.

Despite being training and not combat formations, several were involved in the putting down of the Easter Rising in Dublin in April 1916. A little after noon on Easter Monday, a mixed troop of 9th and 12th Lancers, attached to the 6th Cavalry Reserve Regiment at Marlborough Barracks in Phoenix Park, was dispatched to investigate a "disturbance" at Dublin Castle. As they cantered down Sackville Street, they were fired upon by rebels who had taken up positions in and on the roof of the General Post Office. Three troopers were killed instantly and one was mortally wounded, becoming the first military casualties of the rising. The same evening, 1,600 men of the 3rd Reserve Cavalry Brigade (consisting of the 8th, 9th and 10th Cavalry Reserve Regiments) arrived from their barracks at the Curragh to support the local Dublin garrison.

== Original August 1914 Formations ==
Regiment	Location	Affiliated Regiments	Remarks
1st Life Guards	Hyde Park	1st Life Guards	
2nd Life Guards	Windsor	2nd Life Guards	
Royal Horse Guards	Regent's Park	Royal Horse Guards	
1st	Aldershot	1st Dragoon Guards; 5th Dragoon Guards; 3/1st Queen's Own Royal Glasgow Yeomanry; 3/1st Sherwood Rangers Yeomanry	Absorbed into 4th, 1917
2nd	Aldershot	2nd Dragoon Guards; 6th Dragoons; 3/1st Essex Yeomanry; 3/1st Lothians and Border Horse	Absorbed into 4th, 1917
3rd	Canterbury	3rd Dragoon Guards; 6th Dragoon Guards; 3/1st Northamptonshire Yeomanry; 2/1st Surrey Yeomanry; 1/1st Sussex Yeomanry	Absorbed into 6th, 1917
4th	Tidworth	4th Dragoon Guards; 7th Dragoon Guards; 3/1st Warwickshire Yeomanry; 3/1st Royal Gloucestershire Hussars; 3/1st Queen's Own Worcestershire Hussars	Absorbed into 6th, 1917
5th	York	1st Dragoons; 2nd Dragoons; 3/1st Northumberland Hussars; 3/1st Queen's Own Yorkshire Dragoons; 3/1st Yorkshire Hussars; 3/1st East Riding Yeomanry	Absorbed into 6th, 1917
6th	Dublin	5th (Royal Irish) Lancers; 12th Lancers; 3/1st City of London Yeomanry; 3/1st County of London Yeomanry; B Sqn composed mainly of a draft of 160 NCOs and men from 3/1st Welsh Horse Yeomanry	Absorbed into 1st, 1917
7th	Tidworth	9th Lancers; 21st Lancers; 3/1st Royal Buckinghamshire Yeomanry; 3/1st Berkshire Yeomanry	Absorbed into 1st, 1917
8th	The Curragh	16th Lancers; 17th Lancers; 3/1st Queen's Own Dorset Yeomanry; 3/1st Queen's Own Oxfordshire Hussars	Absorbed into 1st, 1917
9th	Shorncliffe	3rd Hussars; 7th Hussars; 3/2nd County of London Yeomanry; 3/3rd County of London Yeomanry	Absorbed into 2nd, 1917
10th	The Curragh	4th Hussars; 8th Hussars; 3/1st Duke of Lancaster's Own Yeomanry; 2/1st Lancashire Hussars; 3/1st Westmorland and Cumberland Yeomanry	Absorbed into 2nd, 1917
11th	Tidworth	10th Hussars; 18th Hussars; 3/1st Hampshire Yeomanry; 3/1st North Somerset Yeomanry; 3/1st Royal Wiltshire Yeomanry	Absorbed into 5th, 1917
12th	Aldershot	11th Hussars; 13th Hussars; 3/1st Leicestershire Yeomanry; 3/1st Lincolnshire Yeomanry; 3/1st Staffordshire Yeomanry	Absorbed into 3rd, 1917
13th	Colchester	14th Hussars; 20th Hussars; 3/1st Bedfordshire Yeomanry; 3/1st Hertfordshire Yeomanry	Absorbed into 5th, 1917
14th	Longmoor	15th Hussars; 19th Hussars; 3/1st Derbyshire Yeomanry; 3/1st South Nottinghamshire Hussars	Absorbed into 3rd, 1917

== Formed in 1916 ==
Regiment	Location	Affiliated Regiments	Remarks
Household Cavalry	Windsor	Household Battalion	

== After 1917 re-organization ==
Regiment	Location	Affiliated Regiments	Remarks
1st Life Guards	Hyde Park	1st Life Guards	
2nd Life Guards	Windsor	2nd Life Guards	
Royal Horse Guards	Regent's Park	Royal Horse Guards	
Household Cavalry	Windsor	Household Battalion	Disbanded early 1918
1st	The Curragh	5th Lancers; 9th Lancers; 12th Lancers; 16th Lancers; 17th Lancers; 21st Lancers; 3/1st Bedfordshire Yeomanry; 3/1st Lincolnshire Yeomanry; 3/1st City of London Yeomanry; 2/1st Surrey Yeomanry; 3/1st East Riding Yeomanry	
2nd	The Curragh	3rd Hussars; 4th Hussars; 7th Hussars; 8th Hussars; 3/1st Queen's Own Dorset Yeomanry; 2/1st Lancashire Hussars; 3/1st County of London Yeomanry; 3/3rd County of London Yeomanry; 3/1st South Nottinghamshire Hussars; 3/1st Queen's Own Oxfordshire Hussars; 3/1st Westmorland and Cumberland Yeomanry	
3rd	Aldershot	11th Hussars; 13th Hussars; 15th Hussars; 19th Hussars; 3/1st Royal Buckinghamshire Yeomanry; 3/1st Leicestershire Yeomanry; 3/1st Staffordshire Yeomanry; 3/1st Royal Wiltshire Yeomanry; 3/1st Sherwood Rangers Yeomanry	
4th	Aldershot	1st Dragoon Guards; 2nd Dragoon Guards; 5th Dragoon Guards; 6th Dragoons; 3/1st Derbyshire Yeomanry; 3/1st Essex Yeomanry; 3/1st Queen's Own Royal Glasgow Yeomanry; 3/1st Hampshire Yeomanry; 3/2nd County of London Yeomanry; 3/1st Lothians and Border Horse	
5th	Tidworth	10th Hussars; 14th Hussars; 18th Hussars; 20th Hussars; 3/1st Northumberland Hussars; 3/1st Yorkshire Hussars; 3/1st Warwickshire Yeomanry; 3/1st Royal Gloucestershire Hussars; 3/1st Queen's Own Worcestershire Hussars	
6th	Tidworth	3rd Dragoon Guards; 4th Dragoon Guards; 6th Dragoon Guards; 7th Dragoon Guards; 1st Dragoons; 2nd Dragoons; 3/1st Berkshire Yeomanry; 3/1st Hertfordshire Yeomanry; 3/1st Duke of Lancaster's Own Yeomanry; 3/1st Northamptonshire Yeomanry; 3/1st North Somerset Yeomanry; 3/1st Queen's Own Yorkshire Dragoons	

== Bibliography ==
- Rinaldi, Richard A (2008). Order of Battle of the British Army 1914. Ravi Rikhye. ISBN 978-0-97760728-0.
