= Dalemain =

Country house in Cumbria, England

Coordinates: 54.6346°N 2.8116°W

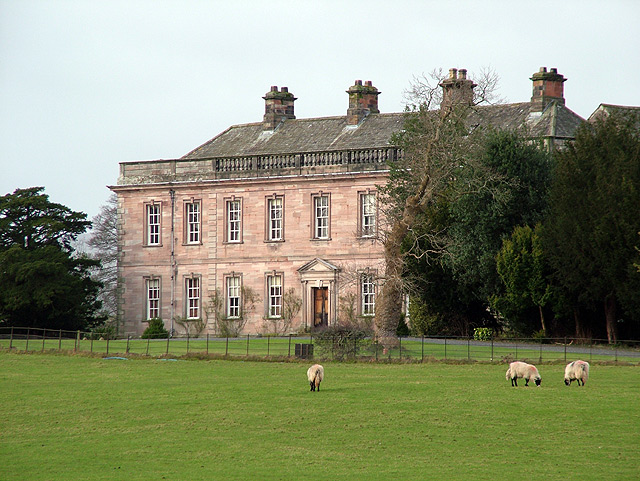
The main facade of Dalemain

Dalemain is a country house around five miles southwest of Penrith in Cumbria, England. It is a Grade I listed building. Dalemain sits within the Lake District National Park.

== History ==
There is evidence of a settlement at Dalemain in Saxon times. Here the river Eamont, which was the boundary between Cumberland and Westmorland, was fordable while also it is sheltered at this point in the valley where often the worst of the weather will go around Dalemain. A peel tower was built on the site during the reign of King Henry II. The old hall dates back to the 12th century, with wings added in the 16th century.

In 1679, Sir Edward Hasell, who had been steward to Lady Anne Clifford, purchased Dalemain and it has remained in the family since then. On his purchase, the house was substantially altered including a grand staircase. The farmyard was modernised and a retaining wall built below the terrace. The impressive Georgian front was completed by his son in 1744, built to enclose the old house within a central courtyard. These rooms followed an elegant, symmetrical design with neoclassical features. In the new front hall, there is a cantilevered staircase. The garden façade was also rebuilt in 1748 to match the new front. There have been no major alterations since that time. The courtyard evolved over the centuries from a mediaeval hamlet, built for defensive reasons, immediately surrounding the original peel tower to the farm buildings which have survived. Above the courtyard lies the Deer Park holding a herd of fallow deer unchanged for hundreds of years.

The gardens have echoes of different fashions in gardening. This includes the Elizabethan knot garden; the surrounding landscaped parkland with glorious views out to the High Fells; the herbaceous terrace; and the wild garden drawing from the work of William Robinson. This is a plantsman's garden with an extraordinary breadth and depth of plant varieties. There is a very good collection of roses; a timeline of apple trees; the magnificent Silver Fir Abies Cephalonica which has the largest girth in the UK which had been a gift from Joseph Banks, the botanist, in the 1840s; and the Himalayan blue poppies Meconopsis grandis Dalemain. In the Spring there are carpets of snow drops, aconites and later daffodils. Yet, this is also a garden for imagination – there is a box topiary dragon; a sleeping earth giant; or, through a door from the light formal garden, Lob’s Wood leafy green with beech trees. Dalemain won the Garden of the Year Award, sponsored by the Historic Houses Association and Christie's, in 2013.

The writer and literary reviewer Elizabeth Julia Hasell lived there. Eva Hasell was born here in 1886. Her parents were Frances Maud (born Flood) and John Edward Hasell JP DL and she was brought up at Dalemain. She became a missionary to Canada and a strong supporter of the church and the British Empire.

== The World's Original Marmalade Awards and Festival ==
Founded in 2005, the World's Original Marmalade Awards and Festival held in March each year at Dalemain have become an landmark culinary event. Entries are sent in from all over the world including Taiwan, Japan, Australia, and Lebanon. The event has raised nearly £250,000 over the years for local charity Hospice at Home Carlisle and North Lakeland, and for palliative care both in the UK and overseas.

In May 2019, a national sister festival, the Japanese Marmalade Awards and Festival, took place in Yawatahama, Ehime, a major centre of Japan's citrus fruit production.

== See also ==
- Grade I listed buildings in Cumbria
- Listed buildings in Dacre, Cumbria
