= Yorkshire Mounted Brigade =

- Active: 1908–1915
- Country: United Kingdom
- Branch: Territorial Force
- Type: Yeomanry Cavalry
- Size: Brigade
- HQ (peacetime): York
- Engagements: World War I

The Yorkshire Mounted Brigade was a formation of Britain's part-time Territorial Force organised in 1908. Mobilised on the outbreak of World War I, its regiments had been posted away by 1915 so it was broken up. It never saw active service.

== Precursor formation ==
From April 1893 the Army List began showing the Yeomanry Cavalry regiments grouped into brigades for collective training. They were commanded by the senior regimental commanding officer but they did have a Regular Army brigade-major. 13th Yeomanry Brigade, consisting of the Yeomanry regiments in Yorkshire, was organised as follows:

- Brigade Headquarters at 20 New Walk, York
- Yorkshire Hussars (Princess of Wales's Own) at York
- Yorkshire Dragoons (Queen's Own) at Doncaster
- 2nd West Yorkshire (Prince of Wales's Own) at Halifax – disbanded March 1894

The Yeomanry brigades disappeared from the Army List after the Second Boer War.

== Formation ==
Under the terms of the Territorial and Reserve Forces Act 1907 (7 Edw.7, c.9), the Yeomanry Cavalry regiments were subsumed into the Territorial Force in 1908 and were formed into mounted brigades. Each consisted of three yeomanry regiments, a horse artillery battery and ammunition column, a transport and supply column and a field ambulance.

As the name suggests, the Yorkshire Mounted Brigade comprised the Yeomanry regiments from the three Ridings of Yorkshire (the East Yorkshire regiment having been formed during the Second Boer War). The Northumberland Hussars were attached for training in peacetime.

== World War I ==
The brigade was embodied on 4 August 1914 and apparently remained in Yorkshire. The regiments left the brigade for other formations in 1915 and it ceased to exist.

- The Yorkshire Hussars was split up as divisional cavalry in April 1915:

Regimental HQ and A Squadron joined 50th (Northumbrian) Division in Northumberland on 4 April. Landed at Le Havre on 18 April 1915
B Squadron joined 46th (North Midland) Division in Luton area. Landed at Le Havre on 28 February 1915
C Squadron joined 49th (West Riding) Division in Yorkshire. Landed at Le Havre on 16 April 1915
D Squadron was dissolved and men dispersed to other squadrons
In May 1916, the regiment reformed and became XVII Corps Cavalry Regiment. In August 1917 it was converted to infantry and absorbed into the 9th (Yorkshire Hussars Yeomanry) Battalion, West Yorkshire Regiment.

- The Yorkshire Dragoons was split up as divisional cavalry in June 1915:

Regimental HQ and B Squadron joined 37th Division on Salisbury Plain by June 1915. Landed at Le Havre on 1 August 1915
A Squadron joined 17th (Northern) Division in Winchester area in June 1915. Landed at Le Havre on 16 July 1915
C Squadron joined 19th (Western) Division at Bulford on 26 June 1915. Landed at Le Havre on 20 July 1915
D Squadron was dissolved and men dispersed to other squadrons
In May 1916, the regiment reformed and became II Corps Cavalry Regiment. In October 1917 it became part of the Cavalry Corps Troops, before joining the 8th (Lucknow) Cavalry Brigade in 4th Cavalry Division in December. In February 1918, the division broken up so the regiment was dismounted and converted to a cyclist battalion, re-joining II Corps on 16 March 1918.

- The East Riding Yeomanry left the brigade in early 1915 and was attached to 63rd (2nd Northumbrian) Division near Newcastle. In May 1915 it joined the North Midland Mounted Brigade of 1st Mounted Division in Norfolk replacing the Welsh Horse Yeomanry. On 27 October 1915, it embarked at Southampton for Salonika but was re-routed to Egypt. It took part in the Sinai and Palestine Campaign up to April 1918 when it amalgamated with the Lincolnshire Yeomanry to form 'D' Battalion Machine Gun Corps and left for the Western Front in France. It ended the war as 102nd (Lincolnshire and East Riding Yeomanry) Battalion, MGC.
- The Northumberland Hussars joined the 7th Division in September 1914 and proceeded to the Western Front. It served as divisional cavalry (April 1915 to May 1916) before reforming as XIII Corps Cavalry Regiment. Thereafter, it acted as VIII (or XIV), III and XII Corps Cavalry Regiment to the end of the war.
- West Riding Royal Horse Artillery joined the Hampshire and Essex RHA in V Lowland Brigade, Royal Field Artillery (T.F.) on formation on 13 January 1916 at Leicester; it was re-equipped with four 18 pounders before departing for Egypt in February 1916. It arrived at Port Said on 2 March and joined 52nd (Lowland) Division at El Qantara on 17 March in the Suez Canal Defences. The battery served with 52nd (Lowland) Division (notably, the Battle of Romani on 4 and 5 August 1916) before being broken up on 30 December: one section (Note: A Subsection consisted of a single gun and limber drawn by six horses (with three drivers), eight gunners (riding on the limber or mounted on their own horses), and an ammunition wagon also drawn by six horses (with three drivers). Two Subsections formed a Section and in a six gun battery these would be designated as Left, Centre and Right Sections.) joined the Hampshire RHA and the other section joined the Essex RHA to bring them up to six 18 pounders each.

By 1915, with its regiments having been posted away, the brigade was dissolved.

== See also ==
- 2/1st Yorkshire Mounted Brigade for the 2nd Line formation
- British yeomanry during the First World War

== Bibliography ==
- Becke, Major A.F. (1988) [1936]. Order of Battle of Divisions Part 2A. The Territorial Force Mounted Divisions and the 1st-Line Territorial Force Divisions (42–56). London: His Majesty's Stationery Office. ISBN 1-871167-12-4.
- Clarke, W.G. (1993). Horse Gunners: The Royal Horse Artillery, 200 Years of Panache and Professionalism. Woolwich: The Royal Artillery Institution. ISBN 09520762-0-9.
- James, Brigadier E.A. (1978). British Regiments 1914–18. London: Samson Books Limited. ISBN 0-906304-03-2.
- Rinaldi, Richard A (2008). Order of Battle of the British Army 1914. Ravi Rikhye. ISBN 978-0-97760728-0.
- Westlake, Ray (1992). British Territorial Units 1914-18. Osprey Publishing. ISBN 978-1-85532-168-7.
