= Elizabeth Julia Hasell =

British writer and literary critic

- Born: 14 November 1830; Dalemain
- Died: 17 January 1887 (aged 56); Dalemain
- Occupations: miscellaneous writer; literary reviewer

Elizabeth Julia Hasell (14/17 January 1830 – 17 January 1887) was a British miscellaneous writer and literary reviewer.

== Early life and education ==
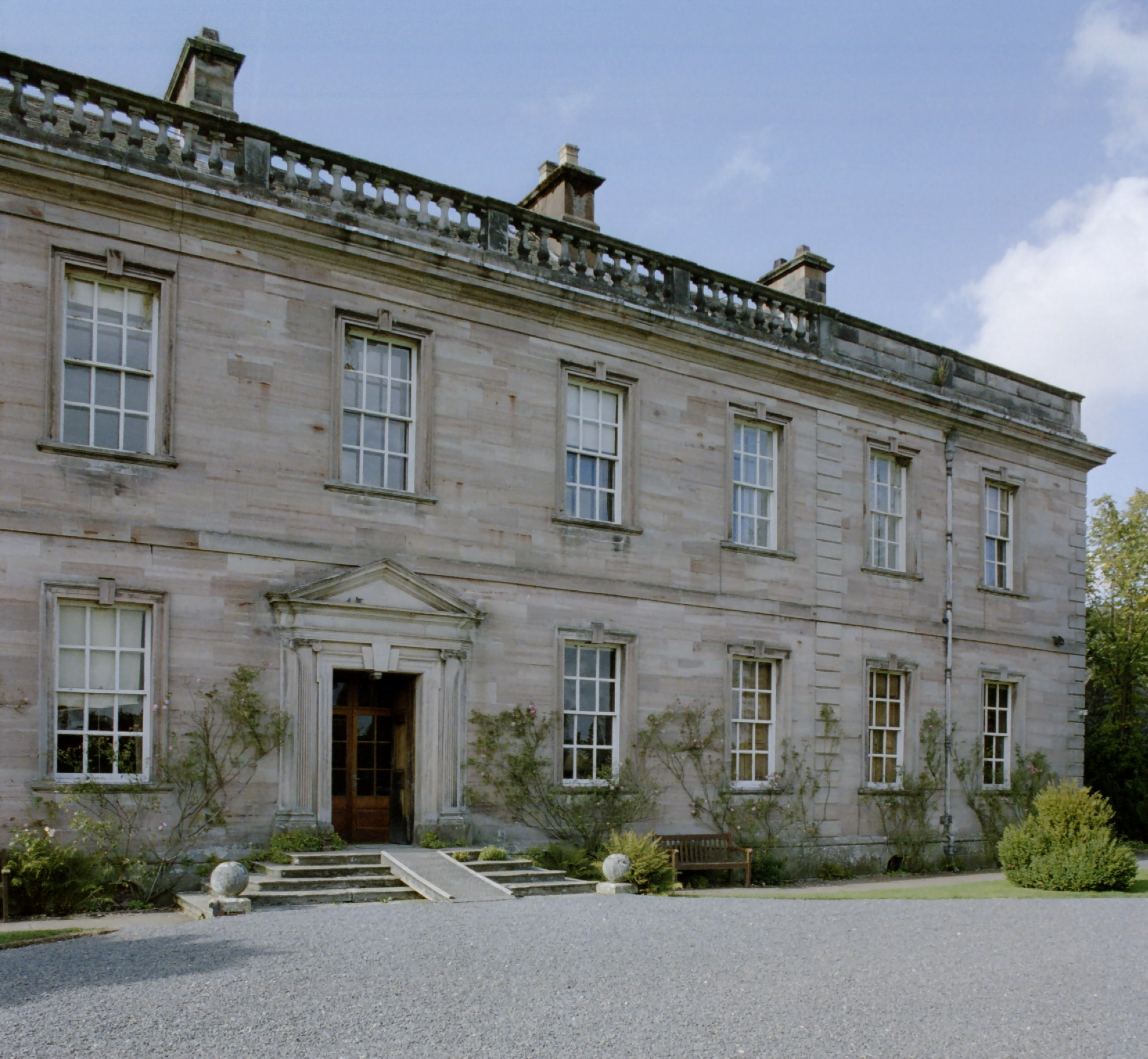
Dalemain mansion, where Hasell grew up and eventually died.

Elizabeth Julia Hasell was born at Dalemain country house, near Penrith, Cumbria, England, on 14 January 1830. (Note: According to Stephen & Lee (1891), Hasell was born on 17 January 1830.) She was the second daughter of Edward Williams Hasell and Dorothea (née King) who lived at Dalemain, and were the lord and lady of the Dacre and Soulby manors.

She was carefully educated at home. At the same time she taught herself, with little or no assistance, Latin, Greek, Spanish, and Portuguese. At an early age, she was writing plays and later narrative poems for her own amusement.

== Career ==
About 1858, she began to contribute to Blackwood's Magazine and also to the Quarterly Review with reviews of notable publications such as Lord Derby's translation of The Iliad, Tennyson's Idylls of the King (1859), Enoch Arden in 1864, and Becket in 1885, and William Morris's Poems (1869). For some time, her attention was largely concentrated on Greek literature. Subsequently, she devoted herself chiefly to the literature of Southern Europe, of which she acquired extensive knowledge. After writing sundry magazine articles on Spanish and Portuguese authors, she compiled two of the most scholarly volumes in the series of Foreign Classics for English Readers -those on Calderón and Torquato Tasso- both published in 1877. She also reviewed occasionally in the Athenaeum.

Besides pursuing her studies, she gave a large portion of her time to promoting education and the general welfare of the district in which she lived, walking long distances across the hills to teach in village schools or deliver extempore addresses, in which she showed a quite unusual facility. Her philanthropic endeavors probably hastened her death, as in her desire to do good to a scattered population, she made light of fatigue and exposure to rain and cold. A deeply religious woman, she was well read in theology.

She died at Dalemain on 16 November 1887.

== Selected works ==
- The Rock: and other short lectures on o of Holy Scripture, 1867
- Short Family Prayers, 1879, 1884
- Bible Partings, 1883
- A devotional work, Via Crucis et Lucis, was the last book she wrote.
