= Randall G. Hassell =

American martial artist

Randall G. Hassell (June 5, 1948 – August 4, 2015) was the Chief Instructor for the American Shotokan Karate Alliance (ASKA), Senior Editor of Tamashii Press, President of the American JKA Karate Association (AJKA), and a Founding Fellow of the International Karate Society (IKS).

Sensei Hassell began his study of the history and philosophy of martial arts in general (and karate-do in particular) while majoring in English Literature at Washington University in St. Louis. As a member of the Japan Karate Association (JKA), Sensei Hassell began karate training in 1960, becoming one of the first Americans to pioneer Shotokan karate and later introducing it to the St. Louis, Missouri area in 1961.

Sensei Hassell later left the JKA in 1984 in order to help form an American counterpart to the JKA, the American JKA Karate Association. On 1 September 2002, he was voted and became President of the AJKA.

In November 2000, Sensei Hassell received honors from many national, state, and local dignitaries in recognition of his 40 years of dedication to Shotokan karate.

As a teacher, Sensei Hassell was known for his concentration on practical application of the fundamental principles of karate and for the application of kata techniques and principles to self-defense and kumite.

In addition to teaching at the ASKA Headquarters Dojo and at various YMCAs and school districts in the St. Louis, Missouri, metro area, Sensei Hassell oversaw the instruction and administration of thousands of students nationwide in ASKA and AJKA affiliated clubs, and traveled extensively, teaching, lecturing, and officiating.

Hassell died on August 4, 2015, at age 67.

== Writings ==
As of March 2006, Sensei Hassell had published more than 100 articles in numerous periodicals around the world, and more than 28 books including:

- Shotokan Karate: Its History and Evolution

Noted for being the first comprehensive written history of Shotokan Karate in any language

- The Complete Idiot's Guide to Karate
- The Karate Experience: A Way of Life
- Conversations with the Master: Masatoshi Nakayama
- Karate Ideals
- The Karate Spirit (Selected Columns from Black Belt magazine)
- Karate Training Guide Volume 1: Foundations of Training
- Karate Training Guide Volume 2: Kata—Heian, Tekki, Bassai Dai
- Samurai Journey (with Osamu Ozawa)
- Zen, pen and sword

== Citations ==
- Martial Arts Illustrated magazine has called Sensei Hassell "Shotokan's Great Communicator" and "The spiritual voice for a generation of karate-do practitioners."
- The Fighter magazine has said Sensei Hassell is, "hands down, the world's finest, most authoritative karate-do writer."
