= Neil Hasell =

Australian rules footballer, born 1918

Personal information
- Full name: Francis Neil Hasell
- Born: 15 September 1918; Kirkstall, Victoria
- Died: 1 February 1998 (aged 79)
- Height: 166 cm (5 ft 5 in)
- Weight: 66 kg (146 lb)

Playing career^{1}
Years	Club	Games (Goals)
1940	North Melbourne	2 (0)
- ^{1} Playing statistics correct to the end of 1940.

Francis Neil Hasell (15 September 1918 – 1 February 1998) was an Australian rules footballer who played with North Melbourne in the Victorian Football League (VFL).
