= Hasell Point Site =

Archaeological site in South Carolina, United States

- U.S. National Register of Historic Places
- Nearest city: Port Royal, South Carolina
- Area: 3 acres (1.2 ha)
- NRHP reference No.: 73001675
- Added to NRHP: August 14, 1973

Hasell Point, an “address restricted” landmark in Beaufort County, South Carolina, with its mix of burial mounds, potter and an oyster shell midden, is a potentially important archaeological site, one that may yield significant information dating to 500 AD. Hasell Point was listed in the National Register of Historic Places on August 14, 1973.
