= Eva Hasell =

- Born: 13 December 1886; Dalemain near Penrith, England
- Died: 3 May 1974 (aged 87); Penrith
- Education: St Christopher's College in Blackheath
- Occupation: missionary

Frances Hatton Eva Hasell MBE (13 December 1886 – 3 May 1974) was a British traveller and missionary in Canada running the "Canadian Caravan Mission".

== Life ==
Hasell was born in Dalemain house, Dacre, near Penrith in 1886. Her parents were Frances Maud (born Flood) and John Edward Hasell JP DL. Her father owned land and the family's wealth enable her to volunteer for church work. She was a strong supporter of the church and the British Empire.

In 1914 she met Aylmer Bosanquet who inspired her. They met at St Christopher's College in Blackheath where she had been sent for religious training and Bosanquet told her of the people of western Canada. Bosanquet was a missionary there and she imagined that the children there could be given Sunday School lessons by women travelling by horse when the weather allowed it. For the rest of the year the children could receive teaching by correspondence. Bosanquet would send her letters from Canada keeping her aware of life in Canada.

At the age of 33 she set out on her life's mission. She used £1,000 of her own money to fund a trip to Canada. In February 1920 she set out from the UK accompanied by Winifred Ticehurst. Ticehurst had also attended St Christopher's College. Coincidentally this was the same year that the Church Missionary Society stopped funding work in Canada. She had purchased a van and they travelled to Regina, Saskatchewan and spent some weeks talking about their plans. They set out on 21 May prepared to travel at an average speed of 10 mph because there were few good roads. They travelled over 3,000 miles and they were well received not only helping at Sunday Schools but starting new ones. She reported back to the church noting that the people there needed help, but the church rarely sent ministers where the potential congregation could not cover the costs of the minister. Hasell returned to the UK and she returned again to Canada this time funded by groups like the Mothers Union. This pattern would continue with her buying a new van and finding a female companion. The van would be gifted to a good cause in Canada at the end of their journey.

In the 1930s she spoke of her worry of the spread of Bolshevism/atheism amongst the poor immigrants in Canada. She made the newspapers when she said that there were 17,000 Bolshevik Sunday Schools in Canada. She was concerned at the mix of nationalities and religions and had a loose relationship with the "Fellowship of the Maple Leaf" who supported the aims of the Empire.

She was awarded the MBE in 1935.

Hasell retired in the 1950s and went to live in Dacre, Cumbria. She died in the hospital in Penrith in 1974.
