= Yeomanry House, Cupar =

Yeomanry House
- Cupar, Scotland
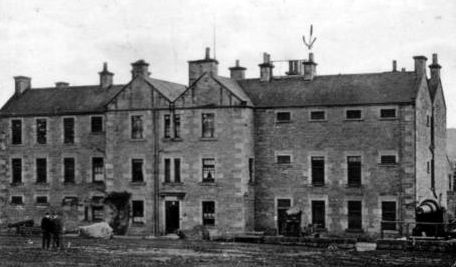
- The barracks at Cupar

Site information
- Type: Barracks
- Owner: Ministry of Defence
- Operator: British Army

Location
- Location within Fife
- Coordinates: 56°19′23″N 03°00′29″W

Site history
- Built: 1842
- In use: 1842-Present

Garrison information
- Occupants: C Squadron the Scottish and North Irish Yeomanry

Yeomanry House is a drill hall of the Scottish and North Irish Yeomanry located in Cupar, Fife.

== History ==
This complex of buildings within a walled compound was completed in 1842 and was used as a prison for criminals until it was converted into a military barracks. Burials of prisoners who were executed or died while incarcerated took place within the prison compound and human remains have been found adjacent to the north east boundary wall. The complex was converted into a drill hall for the 1st Fifeshire Light Horse Volunteer Corps in 1890. This unit amalgamated with the 1st Forfarshire Light Horse to become the Fife and Forfar Yeomanry in 1901 with 'A Squadron', the Fife and Forfar Yeomanry based at Yeomanry House in Cupar. 'A Squadron' was mobilised at the drill hall in August 1914 before being deployed to Gallipoli and ultimately to the Western Front.

After the end of the Second World War, the regiment was re-constituted at the Hunter Street drill hall in Kirkcaldy but it amalgamated with the Scottish Horse to form the Fife and Forfar Yeomanry/Scottish Horse with its headquarters at Yeomanry House in Cupar in 1956. After being reduced to a cadre in 1969 and being disbanded in 1975, a squadron was reformed again as C (Fife and Forfar Yeomanry/Scottish Horse) Squadron, The Scottish Yeomanry at Yeomanry House in Cupar in 1992. This unit evolved to become C (Fife and Forfar Yeomanry/Scottish Horse) Squadron, The Queen's Own Yeomanry in 1999 and C (Fife and Forfar Yeomanry/Scottish Horse) Squadron the Scottish and North Irish Yeomanry, still based at Yeomanry House in Cupar, in 2014.

The building contains a small regimental library and archive collection relating to both the Fife and Forfar Yeomanry and the Scottish Horse which can be viewed by appointment.
