= High Street drill hall, Dunkeld =

Military building in Perth and Kinross, Scotland

High Street drill hall
- Dunkeld, Scotland
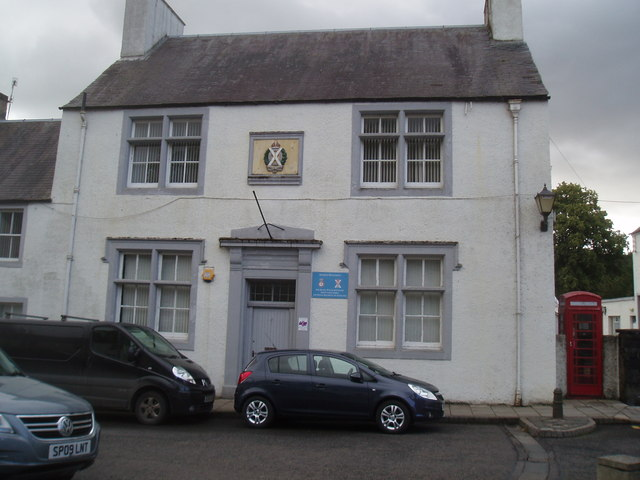
- High Street drill hall

Site information
- Type: Drill hall

Location
- Location in Perth and Kinross
- Coordinates: 56.56535°N 3.58664°W

Site history
- Built: 1900
- Built for: War Office
- In use: 1900 – Present

The High Street drill hall was a military installation in Dunkeld, Scotland.

== History ==
The building was created by the conversion of an early Victorian house for use as the headquarters of the Scottish Horse around 1900. The regiment was mobilised at the drill hall in August 1914 before being deployed to Gallipoli. In 1940, during the Second World War, the Scottish Horse Regiment was split to become the 79th (The Scottish Horse) Medium Regiment, Royal Artillery, and the 80th (The Scottish Horse) Medium Regiment, Royal Artillery. In 1947, the Scottish Horse rejoined the Territorial Army list with its headquarters back at Dunkeld. In 1956, an amalgamation was announced with the Fife and Forfar Yeomanry and, on 31 October 1956, the Scottish Horse became part of a new regiment known as the Fife and Forfar Yeomanry/Scottish Horse with its headquarters at Yeomanry House in Cupar. The drill hall in Dunkeld continues to be used as training centre.
