= Hunter Street drill hall, Kirkcaldy =

Military installation in Kirkcaldy, Scotland

Hunter Street drill hall
- Kirkcaldy, Scotland
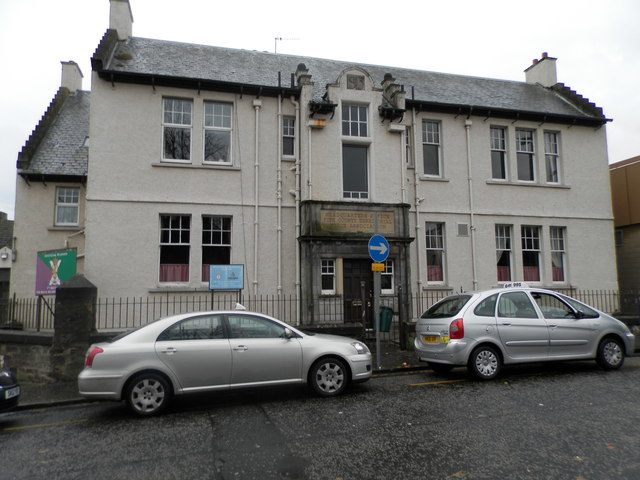
- Hunter Street drill hall, Kirkcaldy

Site information
- Type: Drill hall

Location
- Location within Fife
- Coordinates: 56.11140°N 3.15847°W

Site history
- Built: c.1895
- Built for: War Office
- In use: c.1895 – Present

The Hunter Street drill hall is a military installation in Kirkcaldy, Scotland.

== History ==
The building was designed as a drill hall for 'A Company', 5th (Perthshire Highland) Volunteer Battalion, The Black Watch and completed in around 1895. This unit evolved to become 'A Company', 8th (Cyclist) Battalion, The Black Watch in 1908. The regimental headquarters of the battalion, by then known as the Highland Cyclist Battalion, moved from the Perth Road drill hall in Birnam to the Hunter Street drill hall shortly before the First World War. The battalion was mobilised at the drill hall in August 1914 before being deployed to Ireland in May 1918 and subsequently being disbanded in 1919.

Shortly before the First World War, the headquarters of the Fife and Forfar Yeomanry was also established at the drill hall. The 1st Fife and Forfar Yeomanry was mobilised at the drill hall in August 1914 before being deployed to Gallipoli and ultimately to the Western Front. After the end of the Second World War, the regiment was re-constituted at the drill hall but it amalgamated with the Scottish Horse to form the Fife and Forfar Yeomanry/Scottish Horse with its headquarters at Yeomanry House in Cupar in 1956.

A re-organisation of the Territorial Army took place in 1969 and a rifle platoon of Headquarters Company, 51st Highland Volunteers was formed at the Hunter Street drill hall at that time; the rifle platoon was expanded to create 'B (The Black Watch) Company', 1st Battalion, 51st Highland Volunteers also at the Hunter Street drill hall in 1971. This unit was re-designated 'K Company' in 1975. The presence at the drill hall was reduced to a rifle platoon of 'A (Black Watch) Company' of the 51st Highland Regiment in 1999: the drill hall remains an active Army Reserve Centre used by a rifle platoon of 'A (Black Watch and Argyll and Sutherland Highlanders) Company' of 51st Highland, 7th Battalion The Royal Regiment of Scotland.
