= Vlakfontein =

- Location within Mpumalanga Location within South Africa
- Coordinates: 25.58°S 30.19°E
- Country: South Africa
- Province: Mpumalanga
- District: Nkangala
- Municipality: Emakhazeni
- Time zone: UTC+2 (SAST)
- Postal code (street): 1829
- PO box: 1821

Vlakfontein is a small settlement in the Mpumalanga Province of South Africa. During the Second Boer War it was the site of a guerrilla action against the British forces where a Victoria Cross was awarded to William John English of the Scottish Horse for conspicuous gallantry.
