= Robert Appleby Bartram (British Army officer) =

British soldier and shipbuilder

Colonel Robert Appleby Bartram MC TD
- Born: 2 April 1894; Sunderland, County Durham, England
- Died: 1 June 1981 (aged 87); County Durham, England, UK
- Military career
- Allegiance: United Kingdom
- Branch: British Army
- Rank: Colonel
- Service number: 25228
- Unit: Scottish Horse
- Commands: Scottish Horse
- Conflicts: Gallipoli; Macedonia; France
- Awards: Military Cross; Territorial Decoration
- Other work: Shipbuilder

Colonel Robert Appleby Bartram, MC, TD, DL (2 April 1894 – 1 June 1981) was a British soldier and shipbuilder.

== Early life ==
Bartram was born in Sunderland, the son of George Bartram (1860–1910) and his wife Euphemia Walker OBE, née Rhind, (1871–1956). His namesake grandfather was Sir Robert Appleby Bartram.

== Military career ==
Bartram served in the Scottish Horse during World War I in Gallipoli, Macedonia, and France. In 1938, he took Command of his Regiment, the Scottish Horse, and was responsible for its mobilization at the start of the Second World War. At Dunkeld in 1939, he led the Regiment on its last exercise on horseback before it was split into two and re-roled as gunners.

He remained in command of part of his old Regiment, the 79th (Scottish Horse) Medium Regiment of Royal Artillery until 1940. Retaining his close link to the Scottish Horse, he was the last Honorary Colonel to be appointed and served in this post from 29 May 1952 to its amalgamation 1956. He was then the first Honorary Colonel of the new Fife and Forfar Yeomanry/Scottish Horse, an appointment he held until 28 Mar 1957.

== Civilian life ==
Bartram's father and uncles all predeceased their father, therefore he took over his grandfather's shipbuilding company, Bartram & Sons in 1925 and continued to run it with his brother, George Hylton Bartram, until it was sold in 1968 to Austin & Pickersgill. He was appointed High Sheriff of Durham in April 1950 and a Deputy Lieutenant of Durham in 1956.

Bartram married Winifred Hannah Murray (1895–1985) at St Paul's, Haswell, County Durham (her native village) on 8 May 1924. Their children were Anne V. (born 1925), Colonel George Christopher "Kit" (1927–2013), Marianne V. (born 1929) and Robin Murray (born 1934). Bartram died in Lanchester, County Durham in 1981, aged 87.

Honorary titles
Preceded by Sydney Riley Lord	High Sheriff of Durham; 1950–1951	Succeeded by Thomas George Greenwell
Military offices
Preceded by The Duchess of Atholl	Honorary Colonel of the Scottish Horse; May 1952 - Nov 1956	Succeeded by Last Officer In Post
Preceded by First Officer in Post	Honorary Colonel of the Fife and Forfar Yeomanry/Scottish Horse; Nov 1956 – 28 Mar 1957	Succeeded by The Earl of Lindsay
