= Scottish and North Irish Yeomanry =

The Scottish and North Irish Yeomanry
- Cap badge and TRF of the regiment
- Active: 31 October 2014 – present
- Country: United Kingdom
- Branch: British Army
- Type: Yeomanry
- Role: Light cavalry
- Size: Regiment
- Part of: Royal Armoured Corps
- Regimental Headquarters: Redford Barracks, Edinburgh
- Motto: Per Vigilans (Ever Vigilant)
- Colors: Deep Brunswick Green with St Andrew's Blue over and under
- March: Quick (band) - The Athol Highlanders; Slow (pipes) - The Garb of Old Gaul
- Anniversaries: 24 May - Hitler Line (North Irish Horse)
- Equipment: Jackal 2 / Coyote TSV
- Battle Honours: South Africa 1900-02, Marne 1914, St Quentin Canal, Cambrai 1918, Gallipoli, Jerusalem, Dunkirk, N.W. Europe 1944-45, Djebel Rmel, Tunis, Longstop Hill, Hitler Line, Gothic Line
- Website: Scottish and North Irish Yeomanry

Commanders
- Commanding Officer: Lt Col Ross Anderson
- Honorary Colonel: Col Magnus von Schutz Cormack, QVRM, TD, VR

Insignia
- Arm Badge: Maple Leaf for North Irish Horse (Battle Honour from Hitler Line)
- Tartan: A Squadron - Hunting Erskine and Royal Stewart for pipers B Squadron - Ulster Tartan (modern); C Squadron - Murray of Atholl (modern); E Squadron - "Hound's Tooth" tartan for pipe bag covers

The Scottish and North Irish Yeomanry (SNIY) is a reserve light cavalry regiment created in 2014 as part of the restructuring of the British Army's Army Reserve. It is operationally paired with the Royal Scots Dragoon Guards, based at Leuchars Station in Fife, Scotland. The regiment has numerous squadrons across Scotland and Northern Ireland.

== History ==
On 31 October 2014, under the Army 2020 plan, the Scottish and North Irish Yeomanry was formed from the regimental headquarters of the Royal Mercian and Lancastrian Yeomanry and three squadrons of the Queen's Own Yeomanry. The new regiment was also to include a unit designated the Lothians and Border Horse squadron, which was re-raised shortly thereafter.

In 2018, the regiment was present with its first regimental guidon by Frank Ross, Lord Provost of Edinburgh, on behalf of the Sovereign.

In the 2020s, the regiment was re-organised to include a unit designated the Lovat Scouts squadron.

== Organisation ==
As of June 2026, it consists of:

- Regimental headquarters, at Redford Barracks, Edinburgh
- A (Ayrshire (Earl of Carrick's Own) Yeomanry) Squadron, in Ayr
- B (North Irish Horse) Squadron, in Belfast and Coleraine
- C (Fife and Forfar Yeomanry/Scottish Horse) Squadron, in Cupar and Aberdeen
- E (Lothians and Border Horse) Squadron, in Edinburgh
- HQ (Lovat Scouts) Squadron, (including Pipes and Drums), in Edinburgh

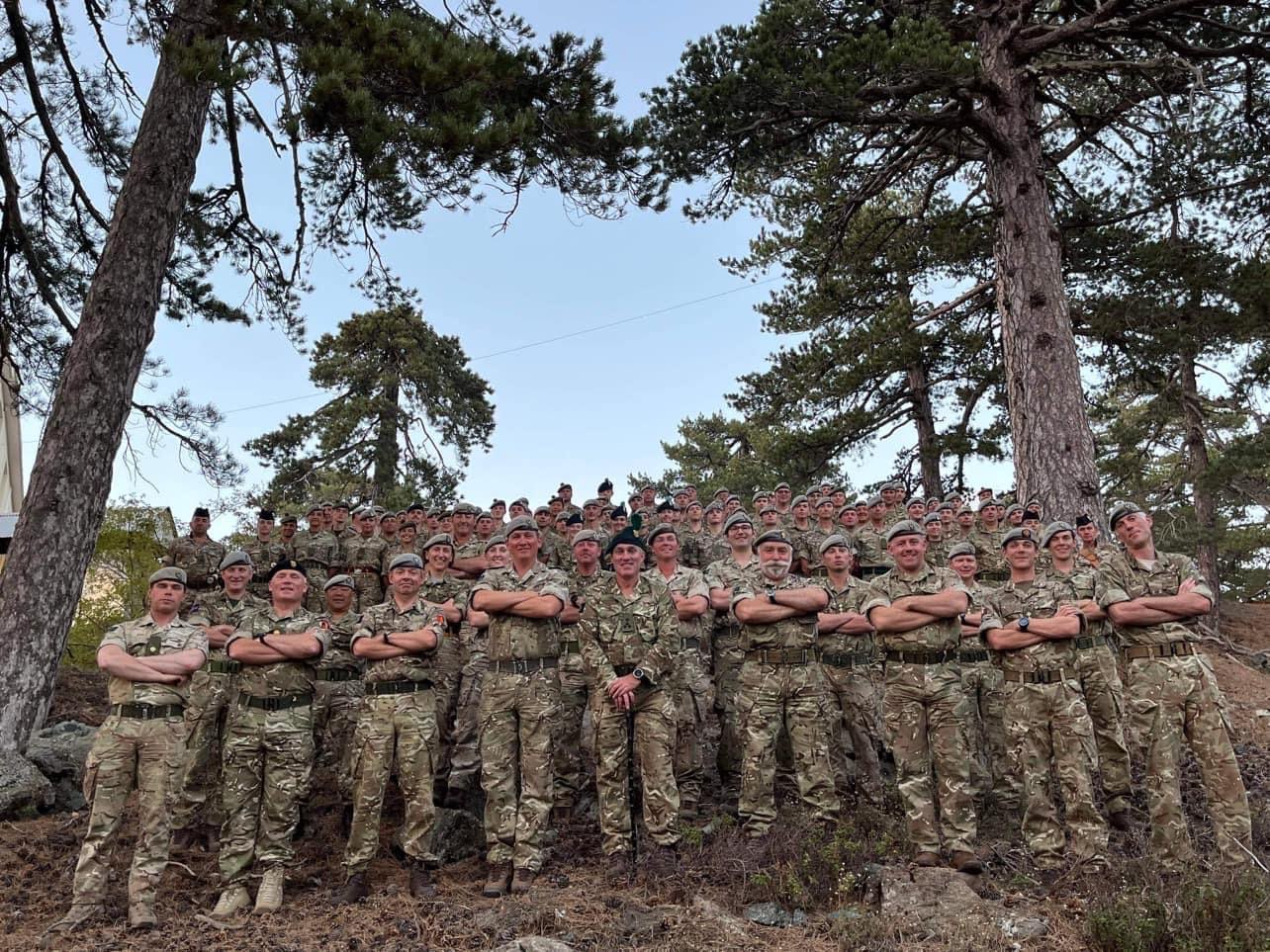
Officers and Men at Ex Kronos Hunter, Cyprus 2022

In accordance with the Strategic Defence and Security Review (2020), the regiment is paired with the Royal Scots Dragoon Guards in the light cavalry role. It is primarily equipped with the Jackal reconnaissance vehicle, having converted from the RWIMIK platform. The regiment was formerly under the control of 51st Infantry Brigade and Headquarters Scotland, but came under control of 19th Brigade in 2022; it is the only army reserve armoured unit in Scotland and Northern Ireland.

== Recruitment ==
The regiment recruits soldiers from around the Scottish counties of Lanarkshire, Lothian, Angus and Ayrshire, and from Northern Ireland.

== Lineage ==
1908 Haldane Reforms	1957 Defence White Paper	1966 Defence White Paper	1992 Options for Change	1998 Strategic Defence Review	2012 Army 2020
Ayrshire (Earl of Carrick's Own) Yeomanry		A Squadron, Queen's Own Yeomanry	A Squadron, Scottish Yeomanry	A Squadron, Queen's Own Yeomanry	A Squadron, Scottish and North Irish Yeomanry
North Irish Horse		D Squadron, Royal Yeomanry	North Irish Horse (Independent Squadron)	B Squadron, Queen's Own Yeomanry	B Squadron, Scottish and North Irish Yeomanry
Fife and Forfar Yeomanry	Fife and Forfar Yeomanry/Scottish Horse	(Suspended Animation)	C Squadron, Scottish Yeomanry	C Squadron, Queen's Own Yeomanry	C Squadron, Scottish and North Irish Yeomanry
Scottish Horse	Fife and Forfar Yeomanry/Scottish Horse	(Suspended Animation)	C Squadron, Scottish Yeomanry	C Squadron, Queen's Own Yeomanry	C Squadron, Scottish and North Irish Yeomanry
Lothian and Border Horse	Queen's Own Lowland Yeomanry	(Suspended Animation)	HQ Squadron, Scottish Yeomanry	(Suspended Animation)	E Squadron, Scottish and North Irish Yeomanry
Lanarkshire Yeomanry	Queen's Own Lowland Yeomanry	(Suspended Animation)	B Squadron Scottish Yeomanry		(Suspended Animation)
Queen's Own Royal Glasgow Yeomanry	Queen's Own Lowland Yeomanry	(Suspended Animation)	B Squadron Scottish Yeomanry		(Suspended Animation)

== Freedoms ==
The regiment has received the freedom of several locations throughout its history; these include:

- (Scotland) 6 May 2014: South Ayrshire ("A" Squadron).
- (Northern Ireland) 1 February 2016: Mid and East Antrim ("B" Squadron).
- (Scotland) 6 July 2019: East Lothian ("E" Squadron).
- (Scotland) 2 April 2022: Edinburgh ("E" Squadron).

== See also ==
- Armed forces in Scotland
- Military history of Scotland
