= Perth Road drill hall, Birnam =

Perth Road drill hall
- Birnam, Scotland
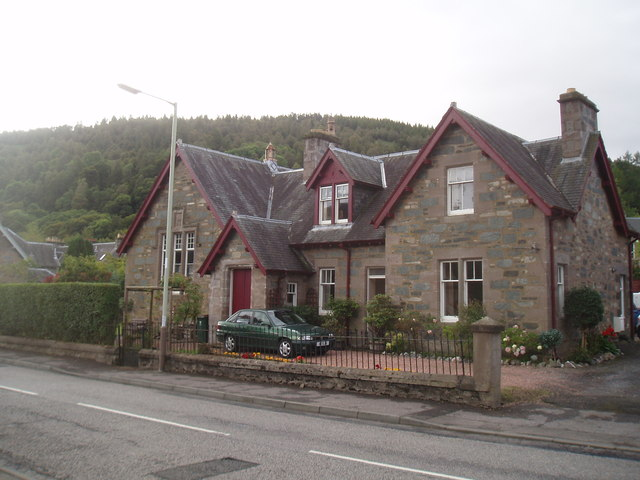
- Perth Road drill hall, Birnam

Site information
- Type: Drill hall

Location
- Location within Perth and Kinross
- Coordinates: 56.55785°N 3.57591°W

Site history
- Built: 1894
- Built for: War Office
- Architect: Andrew Granger Heiton
- In use: 1894 – 1919

The Perth Road drill hall is a former military installation on Perth Road in Birnam, Perth and Kinross, Scotland.

== History ==
The building was designed by Andrew Granger Heiton as the headquarters of the 5th (Perthshire Highland) Volunteer Battalion, The Black Watch and was completed in October 1894. This unit evolved to become the 8th (Cyclist) Battalion, The Black Watch in 1908 and the Highland Cyclist Battalion in 1909. The regimental headquarters moved to the Hunter Street drill hall in Kirkcaldy shortly before the First World War. The regiment was disbanded in 1919 and the building was subsequently converted for residential use.
