= Highland Cyclist Battalion =

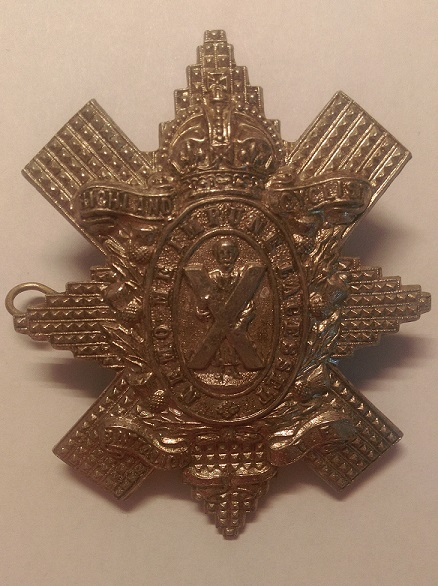
- Highland Cyclist Battalion Cap Badge
- Active: 29 February 1860 – February 1920
- Country: United Kingdom
- Allegiance: British Crown
- Branch: British Army
- Type: Infantry; Bicycle infantry
- Size: Up to three battalions
- Part of: Scottish Command (peacetime)
- Garrison/HQ: Taymouth; Perth Road, Birnam; Hunter Street, Kirkcaldy
- Service: First World War

The Highland Cyclist Battalion was a bicycle infantry battalion of the Territorial Force, part of the British Army. Formed as part of the Volunteer Force in 1860, it became a Volunteer Battalion of the Black Watch (Royal Highlanders) in 1881. In 1909 it became an independent unit and served in the United Kingdom throughout the First World War. In 1920 it was converted as part of the Highland Divisional Signals.

== History ==
=== Volunteer Force ===
From being the closest of allies in the Crimean War (October 1853 – February 1856), Anglo-French relations had deteriorated to such an extent that by 1859 an invasion of Britain seemed a real possibility. An attempt to assassinate the French Emperor, Napoleon III, by Italian nationalists – the Orsini affair – had been linked to Britain as the bombs used in the attempt had been made and tested in England, coupled with the British Government's refusal to restrict the right of asylum. With the regular British Army stretched in the aftermath of the Indian Mutiny (May 1857 – June 1858), a popular movement saw the creation of the Volunteer Force.

Rifle Volunteer Corps were set up throughout Great Britain from May 1859 under the terms of the Volunteer Act 1804 (44 Geo. 3. c. 54). Corps were to be organised in battalions (of eight companies and at least 500 men), companies (60 to 100 men) or sub-divisions (about 30 men). By 1860, the large number of independent Corps led to their merger as consolidated battalions (were a number of Corps existed in a large town or city) or administrative battalions (in more rural areas). Corps in border areas could be included in battalions outside its own county. Administrative battalions could consolidate as and when they chose.

The 2nd Administrative Battalion, Perthshire Rifle Volunteers was formed on 12 November 1861 with Headquarters at Taymouth by grouping the 3rd Perthshire (Breadalbane) Rifle Volunteer Corps of four companies (raised 29 February 1860), the 10th Perthshire Rifle Volunteer Corps (raised 1860) and the 9th Argyllshire Rifle Volunteer Corps (raised 12 April 1860). In 1865, the 9th Argyllshire Rifle Volunteer Corps was transferred to the 1st Administrative Battalion, Argyllshire Rifle Volunteers. (Note: 1st Administrative Battalion, Argyllshire Rifle Volunteers was later the 8th (Argyllshire) Battalion of the Argyll and Sutherland Highlanders.)

In 1869, the headquarters moved to Birnam and the battalion was reorganized. The 3rd Perthshire (Breadalbane) Rifle Volunteer Corps was reduced to the former No. 2 Company, the 4th Perthshire (Breadalbane) Rifle Volunteer Corps was formed from No. 3 Company, 3rd Corps (Nos. 1 and 4 companies were disbanded), 10th Perthshire Rifle Volunteer Corps remained with the battalion until disbanded in 1873, and the 5th, 7th, 9th, 13th and 14th Perthshire Rifle Volunteer Corps joined from the 1st Administrative Battalion. (Note: 1st Administrative Battalion, Perthshire Rifle Volunteers was later the 6th (Perthshire) Battalion of the Black Watch (Royal Highlanders).) 20th Perthshire Rifle Volunteer Corps joined when it was raised on 27 May 1869. In 1874, the battalion gained a subtitle as the 2nd (The Perthshire Highland) Administrative Battalion, Perthshire Rifle Volunteers.

A government committee of 1878 recommended that the remaining administrative battalions be consolidated and in 1880 these recommendations were carried out. Each corps within the battalion lost its independent status and became a lettered company. Initially, each battalion took on the number of its senior constituent corps but this left gaps in the numbering system for counties with more than one battalion, so in June a general renumbering occurred. On 13 April 1880, the battalion was consolidated as the 3rd Perthshire (The Perthshire Highland) Rifle Volunteer Corps, renumbered on 15 June 1880 as the 2nd Perthshire (The Perthshire Highland) Rifle Volunteer Corps. HQ remained at Birnam with

- A Company – Aberfeldy, former 3rd Corps
- B Company – Killin, former 4th Corps
- C Company – Blairgowrie, former 5th Corps
- D Company – Coupar Angus, former 7th Corps
- E Company – Alyth, former 9th Corps
- F Company – St. Martin's, former 13th Corps (moved in 1899 to New Scone)
- G Company – Birnam, former 14th Corps
- H Company – Pitlochry, former 20th Corps

The Childers Reforms of 1881 restructured the infantry of the British Army into multi-battalion regiments. Each regiment was to have two regular battalions, a number of militia battalions and the various Rifle Volunteer Corps were to be designated as volunteer battalions of the new regiments. The changes came into effect on 1 July and the battalion became a volunteer battalion of the Black Watch (Royal Highlanders). The volunteer battalions were to be numbered in a separate sequence from the regulars and militia with the renumbering taking place over a period of time. On 1 December 1887, the battalion became the 5th (Perthshire Highland) Volunteer Battalion, Black Watch (Royal Highlanders). (Note: The various Rifle Volunteers formed Volunteer Battalions of the Black Watch in 1887. They were reorganized as part of the Territorial Force in 1908 when they were renumbered in the same sequence as regular and militia battalions.: Rifle Volunteer Corps; 1st Forfarshire (Dundee) RVC; 2nd Forfarshire (Forfarshire, or Angus) RVC; 3rd Forfarshire (Dundee Highland) RVC; 1st Perthshire RVC; 2nd Perthshire (The Perthshire Highland) RVC; 1st Fifeshire RVC / Volunteer Battalion; 1st (Dundee) VB; 2nd (Angus) VB; 3rd (Dundee Highland) VB; 4th (Perthshire) VB; 5th (Perthshire Highland) VB; 6th (Fifeshire) VB / Territorial Force; 4th (City of Dundee) Battalion; part of 5th (Angus and Dundee) Battalion; part of 5th (Angus and Dundee) Battalion; 6th (Perthshire) Battalion; 8th (Cyclist) Battalion; 7th (Fife) Battalion)

In October 1894 the battalion moved to the Perth Road drill hall in Birnam.

The battalion contributed a number of its members to the several volunteer companies of the Black Watch that went out to South Africa to take part in the Second Boer War. For its service, it was awarded the South Africa 1900–02 battle honour.

=== Territorial Force ===
The Territorial Force (TF) was formed on 1 April 1908 following the enactment of the Territorial and Reserve Forces Act 1907 (7 Edw. 7. c. 9) which combined and re-organised the old Volunteer Force, the Honourable Artillery Company and the Yeomanry. Upon transfer to the Territorial Force, the 5th Volunteer Battalion became a bicycle infantry battalion. Initially designated as the 8th (Cyclist) Battalion, Black Watch (Royal Highlanders), in January 1909 it was separated from the regiment and redesignated as the independent Highland Cyclist Battalion. (Note: The recruitment area of the Black Watch (Royal Highlanders) was Fifeshire, Forfarshire and Perthshire. By the outbreak of the First World War, the Highland Cyclist Battalion also had companies in Stirlingshire.) In 1911, four companies were transferred to the 6th (Perthshire) Battalion, Black Watch, to be replaced by three newly raised companies in Fife.

In August 1914, the battalion was headquartered at the Hunter Street drill hall in Kirkcaldy and had the following companies:

- A Company – Kirkcaldy
- B Company – Cowie
- C Company – Tayport
- D Company – Forfar
- E Company – Dunfermline
- F Company – New Scone
- G Company – East Wemyss
- H Company – Bannockburn

At the outbreak of the First World War, the battalion was in Scottish Command, unattached to any higher formation. It was to be used as mobile infantry, and for work on signals, scouting and similar activities.

=== First World War ===
In accordance with the Territorial and Reserve Forces Act 1907 (7 Edw. 7. c. 9) which brought the Territorial Force into being, the TF was intended to be a home defence force for service during wartime and members could not be compelled to serve outside the country. However, on the outbreak of war on 4 August 1914, many members volunteered for Imperial Service. Therefore, TF units were split in August and September 1914 into 1st Line (liable for overseas service) and 2nd Line (home service for those unable or unwilling to serve overseas) units. Later, 3rd Line units were formed to act as reserves, providing trained replacements for the 1st and 2nd Lines.

==== 1/1st Highland Cyclist Battalion ====
The battalion was mobilized on 4 August 1914 at the outbreak of the First World War and moved to its war station at East Linton, East Lothian. In 1915 it was transferred to the Army Cyclist Corps. and by July of that year it had moved to St Andrews. In May 1918, it moved to Ireland and was based at Enniskillen and Randalstown where it remained until the end of the war. The battalion was disembodied on 3 December 1919.

==== 2/1st Highland Cyclist Battalion ====
The 2nd Line battalion was formed at Kirkcaldy in November 1914. (Note: Frederick claims that the 2/1st Highland Cyclist Battalion was formed on 14 July 1915.) In 1915 it was at Montrose and in 1916 at Arbroath. In May 1918, it also moved to Ireland and was based at Athlone. In August 1918 it moved to Curragh Camp where it remained. The battalion was disbanded on 3 July 1919.

In July 1915, the battalion provided personnel for the 1st Provisional Cyclist Company. The company was disbanded on 13 April 1916.

==== 3/1st Highland Cyclist Battalion ====
The 3rd Line battalion was formed at Kirkcaldy in 1915 to provide trained replacements for the 1st and 2nd Line battalions. It was disbanded in March 1916 and the men were posted to 1/1st and 2/1st Battalions and to the Machine Gun Corps.

=== Post war ===
The Territorial Force was disbanded after the First World War, although this was a formality and it was reformed in 1920. From 1 October 1921 it was renamed as the Territorial Army.

One major change with the new Territorial Army had an effect on the number of infantry battalions. The original 14 divisions were reformed with the pre-war standard of three brigades of four battalions each, for a total of 168 battalions. Infantry were no longer to be included as Army Troops or part of the Coastal Defence Forces so the pre-war total of 208 battalions had to be reduced by 40. This was achieved by either converting certain battalions to other roles, usually artillery or engineers, or by amalgamating pairs of battalions within a regiment. In particular, based on war time experience, the Army decided to dispense with cyclists units and the existing battalions were either disbanded or converted to artillery or signals units.

The Highland Cyclist Battalion was absorbed into the Highland Divisional Signals in 1920.

== See also ==
- Army Cyclist Corps

== Bibliography ==
- Frederick, J.B.M. (1984). Lineage Book of British Land Forces 1660–1978. Wakefield, Yorkshire: Microform Academic Publishers. ISBN 1-85117-009-X.
- James, Brigadier E.A. (1978). British Regiments 1914–18. London: Samson Books Limited. ISBN 0-906304-03-2.
- Rinaldi, Richard A (2008). Order of Battle of the British Army 1914. Ravi Rikhye. ISBN 978-0-97760728-0.
- Westlake, Ray (1986). The Territorial Battalions, A Pictorial History, 1859–1985. Tunbridge Wells: Spellmount.
