= Scottish Horse Mounted Brigade =

- Active: August 1914 – February 1916
- Country: United Kingdom
- Branch: British Army
- Type: Yeomanry
- Size: Brigade
- Engagements: World War I Gallipoli 1915 Egypt 1916

Commanders
- Notable commanders: Br-Gen Marquis of Tullibardine

The Scottish Horse Mounted Brigade was a formation of the Territorial Force of the British Army, raised in August 1914, (Note: Rinaldi says the brigade was formed in November 1914. Becke and James say August 1914.) during the First World War. After service in the Gallipoli Campaign and in the defence of Egypt, it was absorbed into the 1st Dismounted Brigade in February 1916.

== Pre-War ==
At the outbreak of World War I, the 1st and 2nd Scottish Horse Regiments were Unattached in Scottish Command. In peacetime they were organised as:

1st Scottish Horse, Dunkeld

A Squadron at Blair Atholl
B Squadron at Dunkeld
C Squadron at Coupar Angus
D Squadron at Dunblane

2nd Scottish Horse, Aberdeen

E Squadron at Elgin
F Squadron at Kintore
G Squadron at Aberdeen
H Squadron at Connel, Argyll

The 3rd Scottish Horse was formed in August 1914 at the outbreak of World War I. The 1st and 2nd Regiments appear to have been attached to the Highland Division at Bedford and West Riding Division at Doncaster for a short time.

== World War I ==
Br-Gen Marquis of Tullibardine was assigned to command the brigade on 15 August 1914 with 1st, 2nd and 3rd Scottish Horse under command, along with the Scottish Horse Mounted Brigade Field Ambulance, RAMC. By November 1914, the brigade was in Northumberland on coast defence duties and was attached to the 63rd (2nd Northumberland) Division from January to August 1915.

=== Brigade Field Ambulance ===
The Scottish Horse Field Ambulance developed an operating car, designed by Colonel H. Wade in 1914, which enclosed an operating table, sterilisers, full kit of instruments and surgical equipment, wire netting, rope, axes and electric lighting in a Wolseley chassis. The car was used during the Gallipoli Campaign at Suvla, in the Libyan Desert (during the Senussi Campaign), and at El-Qantarah in Egypt before being attached to the Desert Mounted Corps Operating Unit in 1917. Subsequently taking part in the Southern Palestine Offensive, which culminated in the Capture of Jerusalem.

=== Gallipoli ===
On 17 August 1915, the brigade boarded SS Transylvania at Devonport and sailed to Gallipoli where it landed at Suvla on 2 September. It joined 2nd Mounted Division and remained with it until evacuated on the night of 19/20 December 1915. It left 2nd Mounted Division on 22 December. It was transported to Alexandria via Imbros (20-24 December), arriving on 28 December and went to Sidi Bishr Camp.

=== Egypt ===
In late December 1915, the brigade arrived in Egypt. In February 1916, the Scottish Horse Mounted Brigade was absorbed into the 1st Dismounted Brigade (along with the Lowland Mounted Brigade) under the command of the 52nd (Lowland) Division to defend the Suez Canal. Br-Gen Marquis of Tullibardine was assigned to command the new dismounted brigade.

== See also ==
- 2/1st Scottish Horse Mounted Brigade for the 2nd Line formation
- British yeomanry during the First World War

== Bibliography ==
- Becke, Archibald F. (1936). Order of Battle of Divisions Part 2A. The Territorial Force Mounted Divisions and the 1st-Line Territorial Force Divisions (42–56). London: HMSO. OCLC 4405016.
- Becke, Archibald F. (1937). Order of Battle of Divisions Part 2B. The 2nd-Line Territorial Force Divisions (57th–69th) with The Home-Service Divisions (71st–73rd) and 74th and 75th Divisions. London: HMSO. OCLC 4405016.
- James, Brigadier E.A. (1978). British Regiments 1914–18. London: Samson Books Limited. ISBN 0-906304-03-2.
- Rinaldi, Richard A (2008). Order of Battle of the British Army 1914. Ravi Rikhye. ISBN 978-0-97760728-0.
- Westlake, Ray (1996). British Regiments at Gallipoli. Barnsley: Leo Cooper. ISBN 0-85052-511-X.
