= Scottish Horse War Memorial =

Monument in Johannesburg, South Africa

Coordinates: 26°12′1.73″S 28°5′5.51″E

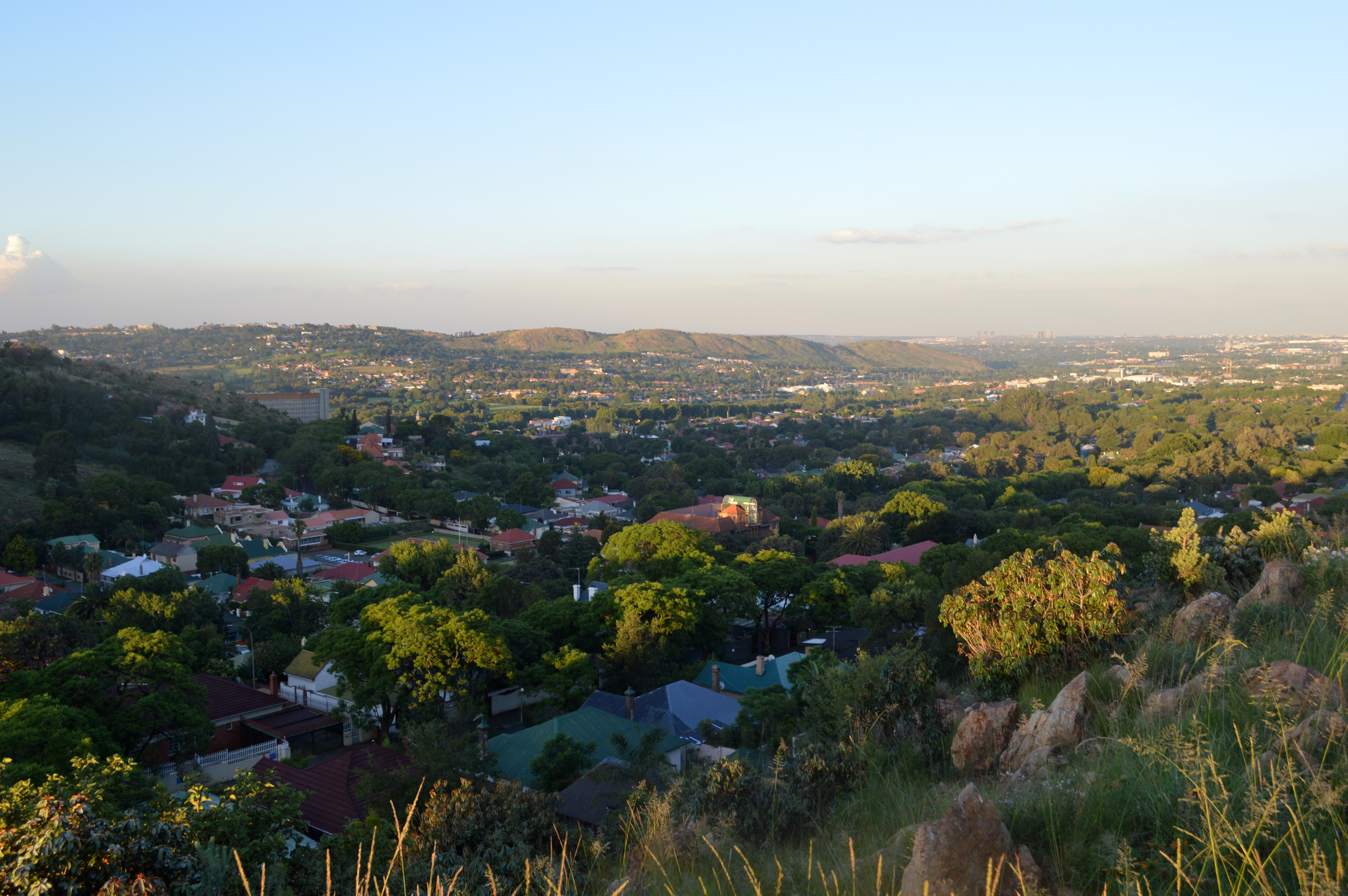
The view from the Scottish Horse War Memorial on Kensington (foreground) and Bezuidenhout Valley (middle ground).

The Scottish Horse War Memorial (Afrikaans: Scottish Horse-gedenkteken) is a monument in Kensington, Johannesburg, South Africa. It was built on Caledonia Hill, between Somerset Road on the north side, Katoomba Street on the east, Highland Rd on the south, and Good Hope Street on the west. It was built to commemorate soldiers who fought in the Scottish Horse British Army yeomanry regiment during the Second Boer War.

== History ==
During the Second Boer War, the Scottish Horse was raised in 1900 with a second battalion being raised by men of Scottish origin in Australia in 1901. After the war, the Caledonian Clubs in southern Africa wished to demonstrate their loyalty to the British Empire but also to celebrate their Scottish heritage. The monument was designed by William Tait-Conner and unveiled on 19 May 1904. An exact replica was erected in the same year at Edinburgh Castle in Scotland. It consists of a Celtic cross embossed on a granite-lined pedestal.

The Memorial can be reached by steps from Highland Rd and is a popular lookout with a view of the surrounding suburbs and beyond them of the Hillbrow Tower downtown. The memorial contains the names of members of the Scottish Horse regiment that died during the war. The memorial also later came to be viewed as the official memorial for the Transvaal Scottish regiment, that traced its origins back to the Scottish Horse. This notably includes the names of four Zulu Scouts who fought in the regiment, being a rare early example of black soldiers being commemorated in a war memorial in South Africa. Jeppe High School for Boys holds an annual Remembrance Day service and lay wreaths at the Memorial.
