= 1st Dismounted Brigade =

WWI British Army formation

- Active: February 1916–October 1916
- Country: United Kingdom
- Branch: British Army
- Type: Dismounted Yeomanry
- Size: Brigade
- Engagements: World War I: Egypt 1916

The 1st Dismounted Brigade was a formation of the British Army in World War I. It was formed in Egypt in February 1916 by absorbing the Lowland and Scottish Horse Mounted Brigades. The brigade was on Suez Canal defences attached to the 52nd (Lowland) Division and was broken up in October 1916.

== Formation ==
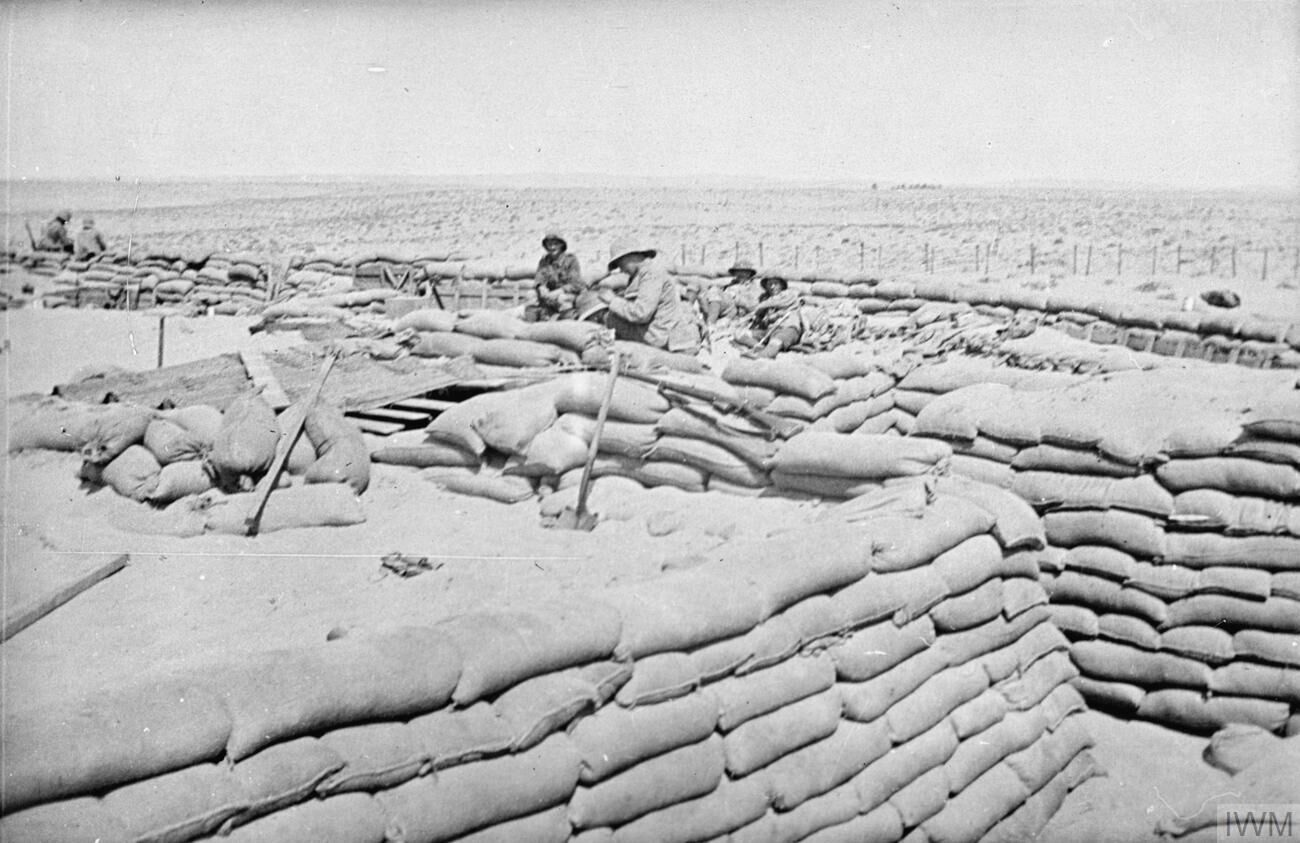
1st Regiment Scottish Horse constructing a redoubt at Duadar, Summer 1916

The 1st Dismounted Brigade was formed in Egypt in February 1916 by absorbing the Lowland Mounted Brigade and the Scottish Horse Mounted Brigade.

The Scottish Horse Mounted Brigade had served dismounted in the Gallipoli Campaign from September to December 1915 with the 2nd Mounted Division before being withdrawn to Egypt. Similarly, the Lowland Mounted Brigade served in Gallipoli from October until 30 December 1915 with 52nd (Lowland) Division when it was evacuated to Mudros. It was transferred to Egypt, arriving on 7 February 1916 and was immediately absorbed into the 1st Dismounted Brigade. On formation, the 1st Dismounted Brigade was commanded by Br-Gen Marquis of Tullibardine (former commander of the Scottish Horse Mounted Brigade) and consisted of:

- 1/1st Ayrshire Yeomanry
- 1/1st Lanarkshire Yeomanry
- 1/1st Scottish Horse
- 1/2nd Scottish Horse
- 1/3rd Scottish Horse
- 1st Dismounted Brigade Signal Company
- 1st Dismounted Brigade MG Company
- 1st Lowland Mounted Brigade Field Ambulance, RAMC
- 1st Scottish Horse Mounted Brigade Field Ambulance, RAMC

From 8 February 1916, the brigade was attached to the 52nd (Lowland) Division in No. 3 (Northern) Section, Suez Canal Defences. The brigade remained with 52nd (Lowland) Division until 16 October 1916 when the brigade was dissolved.

== Dissolved ==
On 27 September 1916, 3rd Scottish Horse was converted to form 26th (Scottish Horse) Squadron, Machine Gun Corps. It also provided a company to the Lovat's Scouts which formed the 10th (Lovat's Scouts) Battalion, Queen's Own Cameron Highlanders. The battalion was transferred to Salonika, arriving 20 October, where it joined 82nd Brigade, 27th Division.

On 1 October 1916, 1st Scottish Horse and 2nd Scottish Horse were amalgamated to form 13th (Scottish Horse Yeomanry) Battalion, Black Watch. The battalion was transferred to Salonika, arriving 21 October, where it joined 81st Brigade, 27th Division.

In October 1916, the remnants of the 1st Dismounted Brigade (Ayrshire Yeomanry and Lanarkshire Yeomanry) were absorbed into 2nd Dismounted Brigade which was later renamed as 229th Brigade in the 74th (Yeomanry) Division.

== See also ==
- 2nd Dismounted Brigade
- Lowland Mounted Brigade
- Scottish Horse Mounted Brigade
- British yeomanry during the First World War

== Bibliography ==
- Becke, Major A.F. (1989) [1st Pub. 1936]. Order of Battle of Divisions Part 2A. The Territorial Force Mounted Divisions and the 1st-Line Territorial Force Divisions (42-56). London: His Majesty's Stationery Office. ISBN 1-871167-12-4.
- Becke, Major A.F. (1988) [1st Pub. 1937]. Order of Battle of Divisions Part 2B. The 2nd-Line Territorial Force Divisions (57th-69th) with The Home-Service Divisions (71st-73rd) and 74th and 75th Divisions. London: His Majesty's Stationery Office. ISBN 1-871167-00-0.
- James, Brigadier E.A. (1978). British Regiments 1914–18. London: Samson Books Limited. ISBN 0-906304-03-2.
- Westlake, Ray (1996). British Regiments at Gallipoli. Barnsley: Leo Cooper. ISBN 0-85052-511-X.
