= 153 (Highland) Transport Regiment =

- Active: 1967–1993
- Country: United Kingdom
- Branch: British Army
- Type: Regiment
- Role: Logistics
- Part of: Royal Logistic Corps

153rd (Highland) Transport Regiment, Royal Corps of Transport, was a regiment of the Territorial Army in the United Kingdom.

== History ==
The regiment was formed from 433 (Forth) Regiment, Royal Corps of Transport in 1967. It consisted of three transport squadrons. A third transport squadron, 239 Squadron, was formed in 1969 taking many of the soldiers who had served in The Fife and Forfar Yeomanry/Scottish Horse when it was converted into a cadre in that year. Princess Alice visited the regiment in 1982. In 1992, 239 Squadron converted to re-form the Forfar Yeomanry/Scottish Horse Squadron of The Scottish Yeomanry. The regiment was amalgamated with 154 (Lowland) Transport Regiment in 1993 to form The Scottish Transport Regiment of the Royal Logistic Corps in 1993.

== Structure ==
The final structure was as follows:

- 212 Ambulance Squadron
- 230 Squadron
- 231 Squadron
