= John Murray Prain =

Lieutenant Colonel John Murray Prain DSO, OBE, TD, DL (1902–1985) was a British Yeomanry officer in the Second World War and prominent Scottish businessman.

== Family life ==
He lived at Longrigg, St. Andrews, Fife, Scotland and married Lorina Helen Elspeth Skene. They had two children, Philip James Murray Prain (born November 1936) and Tessa Helen Murray Prain (born 28 January 1940).

== Education and early life ==
Educated at Charterhouse and Clare College, University of Cambridge.

== Military service ==
Commissioned into the Cupar Section of the Fife and Forfar Yeomanry which was part of the Territorial Army and by 1935 he was a captain.

Mobilized to serve in World War II, he saw action with his Regiment in Belgium and France in 1940 as part of the BEF. He commanded his regiment during the retreat to Dunkirk, after the commanding officer had been killed. He was wounded in action in France, 1940 and awarded the DSO the same year.

He was transferred to Special Operations Executive (SOE) in 1941, where he stayed for two years before taking a post as General Staff Officer from 1943 to 1944.

He was awarded Territorial Decoration, 1943 and promoted to Lt Col. With his first command being the Royal Armoured Corps Officer Cadet Training Unit at the Royal Military College Sandhurst, 1944–1945.

He returned to his Regiment the Fife and Forfar Yeomanry after the war and eventually commanded it as until 1948 as a Territorial Army officer while he began his business career.

== Business career ==
He started his business career with the long-established family firm of James Prain & Sons, jute manufacturers in Dundee. He spent much time working in a voluntary capacity assisting with business arbitration courts and the promotion of British industry

He worked for the following companies:

- Chairman, James Prain and Sons Ltd, Dundee, until 1956
- Member, Jute Working Party, 1946–1948
- Member, Scottish Committee, Industrial and Commercial Finance Corporation, 1946–1955
- Vice Chairman, Caird (Dundee) Ltd, 1956–1964
- Director, Tayside Floorcloth Company Ltd, 1946–1969
- Director, Alliance Trust Company Ltd, 1946–1973
- Chairman, Jute Importers Association, 1947–1949
- Director, The Scottish Life Assurance Company Ltd, 1949–1972
- Chairman, Association of Jute Spinners and Manufacturers, 1950–1952
- Part-time Member, Scottish Gas Board, 1952–1956
- Director, Royal Bank of Scotland, 1955–1971

== Other Positions Held ==
- Member, Employers' Panel, Industrial Court, 1959–1971
- Member, Industrial Arbitration Board, 1971–1972
- Chairman, Dundee District Committee, Scottish Board for Industry, 1948–1962
- Member, Employers' Panel, Industrial Disputes Tribunal, 1952–1959

== Honours and Titles ==
He was decorated with the award of Companion of the Distinguished Service Order (DSO). He was invested as an Officer in the Order of the British Empire (OBE) in 1956. He held the office of Deputy Lieutenant (DL) in the County of Fife from 1958. Member of Queen's Bodyguard for Scotland, the Royal Company of Archers. Honorary President, Fife and Kinross Area Council, Royal British Legion (Scotland).
