= Brian Harold Thomson =

Colonel Brian Harold Thomson (21 November 1918 – 7 November 2006) was a newspaper proprietor of D. C. Thomson & Co. and soldier in the Fife and Forfar Yeomanry. He was widely known as "Mr Brian" within D. C. Thomson & Co. and throughout the business community of Dundee.

== Education ==
Brian was educated at Charterhouse and spent a year in Germany before joining the family firm (D. C. Thomson & Co.) in 1937.

== DC Thomson & Co. ==
Brian Thomson was a great-grandson of William Harold Thomson, a Dundonian who prospered first as a draper and later as a shipowner, and in 1884 became the major shareholder of The Dundee Courier & Daily Argus.

William's son, David Couper Thomson, became general manager of the paper, and in 1905 a growing portfolio of newspaper interests was consolidated as D. C. Thomson & Co..

David Couper Thomson remained chairman of the company until his death, aged 93, in 1954; but it was his nephew, Harold (Brian's father), who drove the expansion of its publishing interests, particularly in the field of comics. The Sunday Post, launched in 1914, introduced a "Fun" section in 1936 which became home to iconic cartoon characters such as Oor Wullie and the Broons.

Brian became a joint Managing Director in 1948 and succeeded his father as chairman in 1974. He conducted business according to strict principles of fairness and courtesy. He did not believe that his company's affairs were the concern of anyone but himself and his board, and he almost never spoke about them to the outside world.

His publications upheld traditional Scottish family values and tastes, typified by the homely tone of the Sunday Post and by magazine titles such as Classic Stitches.

== Military service ==
In September 1939 he joined the Fife and Forfar Yeomanry. Posted to Montgomery's Eighth Army in early 1943 and served in armoured cars in North Africa and in the intense battles fighting up the spine of Italy.

After the war he continued to serve in the Yeomanry. He was promoted to lieutenant-colonel and from 1953 to 1955 he commanded his Regiment, the Fife and Forfar Yeomanry.

== Family life and private life ==
He married in 1947 Patricia Cunninghame (died 1991) and had one son Christopher, now chairman of D. C. Thomson & Co., and four daughters.

He loved his garden and woodlands, enjoyed shooting, and was a fine golfer at Royal and Ancient at St Andrews, where he reached the final of the Jubilee Vase in 1953; he continued to play regularly until he was well into his eighties.

Brian Thomson was appointed a Deputy Lieutenant of Fife in 1988.

== See also ==
- List of DC Thomson Publications
- British comics
