= Fife and Forfar Yeomanry/Scottish Horse =

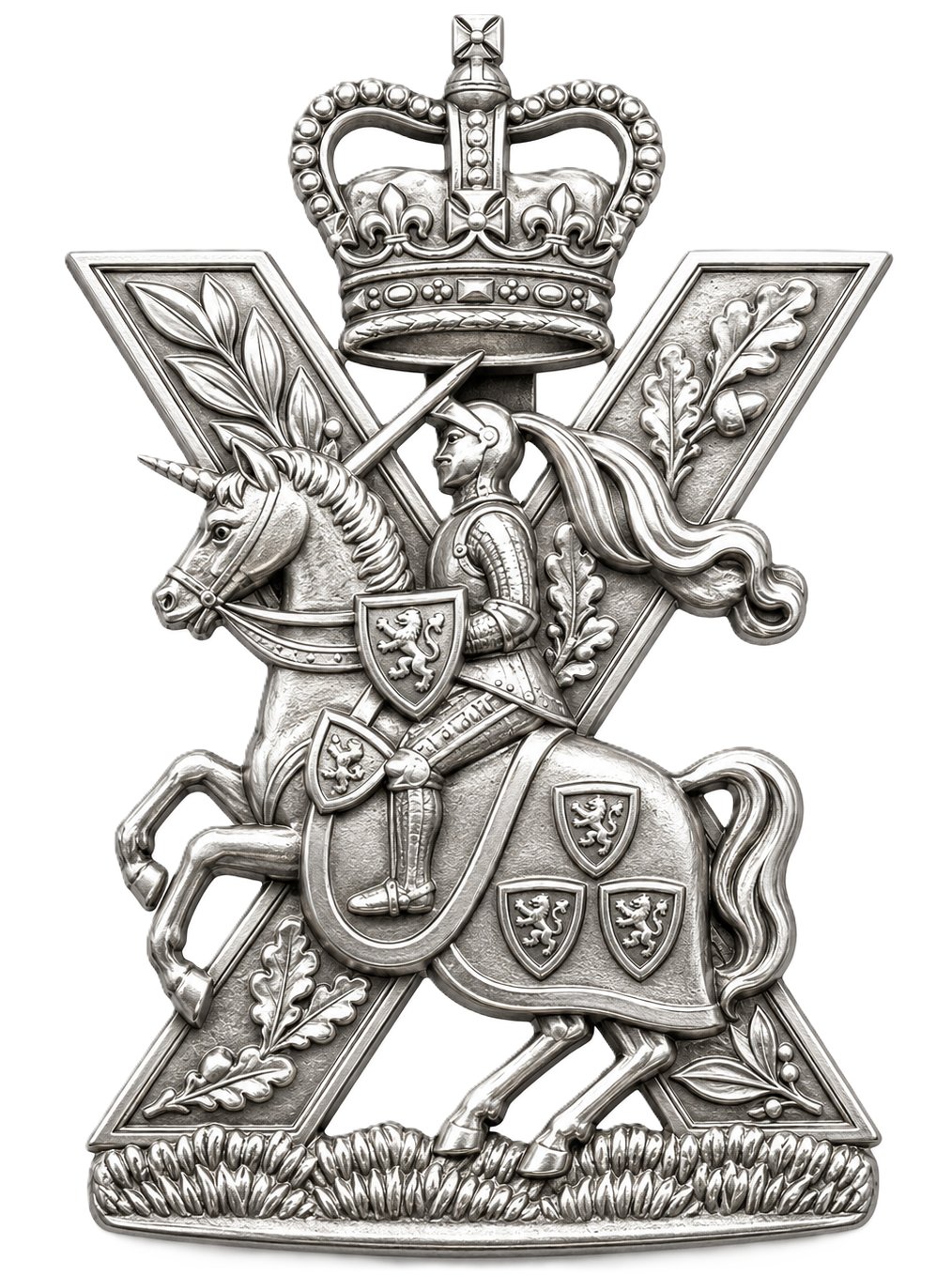
- Cap badge of the Fife and Forfar Yeomanry/Scottish Horse
- Active: 1956–present
- Country: United Kingdom
- Branch: British Army
- Type: Yeomanry
- Role: Light cavalry
- Size: Since 1992 only one squadron
- Part of: Scottish and North Irish Yeomanry
- Garrison/HQ: HQ at Yeomanry House, Cupar
- Nickname: The Highland Cavalry
- Mottos: Pro Aris et Focis (For Hearth and Home)
- March: Quick - Wee Cooper of Fife (band); The Scottish Horse (pipes and drums); Slow - The Garb of Old Gaul (band); Bonnie Dundee (pipes and drums)

Commanders
- Notable commanders: Duke of Atholl; Sir John Gilmour 2nd Bt; Sir John Gilmour, 3rd Bt; Earl of Lindsay

Insignia
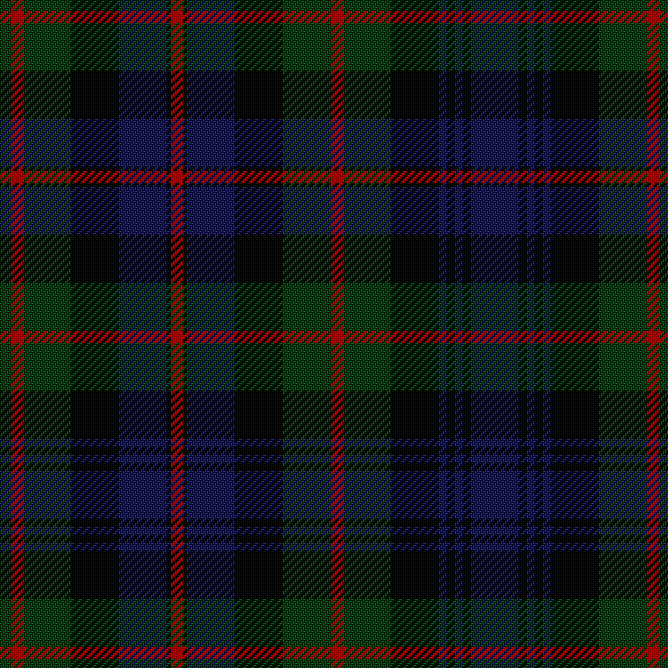
- Regimental Tartan (Murray of Atholl)

The Fife and Forfar Yeomanry/Scottish Horse is adopted as the C squadron of the Scottish and North Irish Yeomanry as a Light Cavalry Squadron. It is a Yeomanry Squadron of the British Territorial Army (Army Reserve). It was formed following the amalgamation of The Fife and Forfar Yeomanry and The Scottish Horse regiments. Because of the geographic spread of the regiment C Squadron is administered by 51st (Scottish) Brigade.

The Scottish and North Irish Yeomanry is the only yeomanry regiment that serves in the formation reconnaissance role, equipped with the Scimitar and Spartan armoured reconnaissance vehicles. On mobilisation, it would reinforce one of the regular army formation reconnaissance regiments. The squadron provided personnel for active service during Operation TELIC, where they served with their regular counterparts in the Royal Armoured Corps.

The FFY/SH and its antecedent regiments have won numerous battle honours and one Victoria Cross.

== History ==
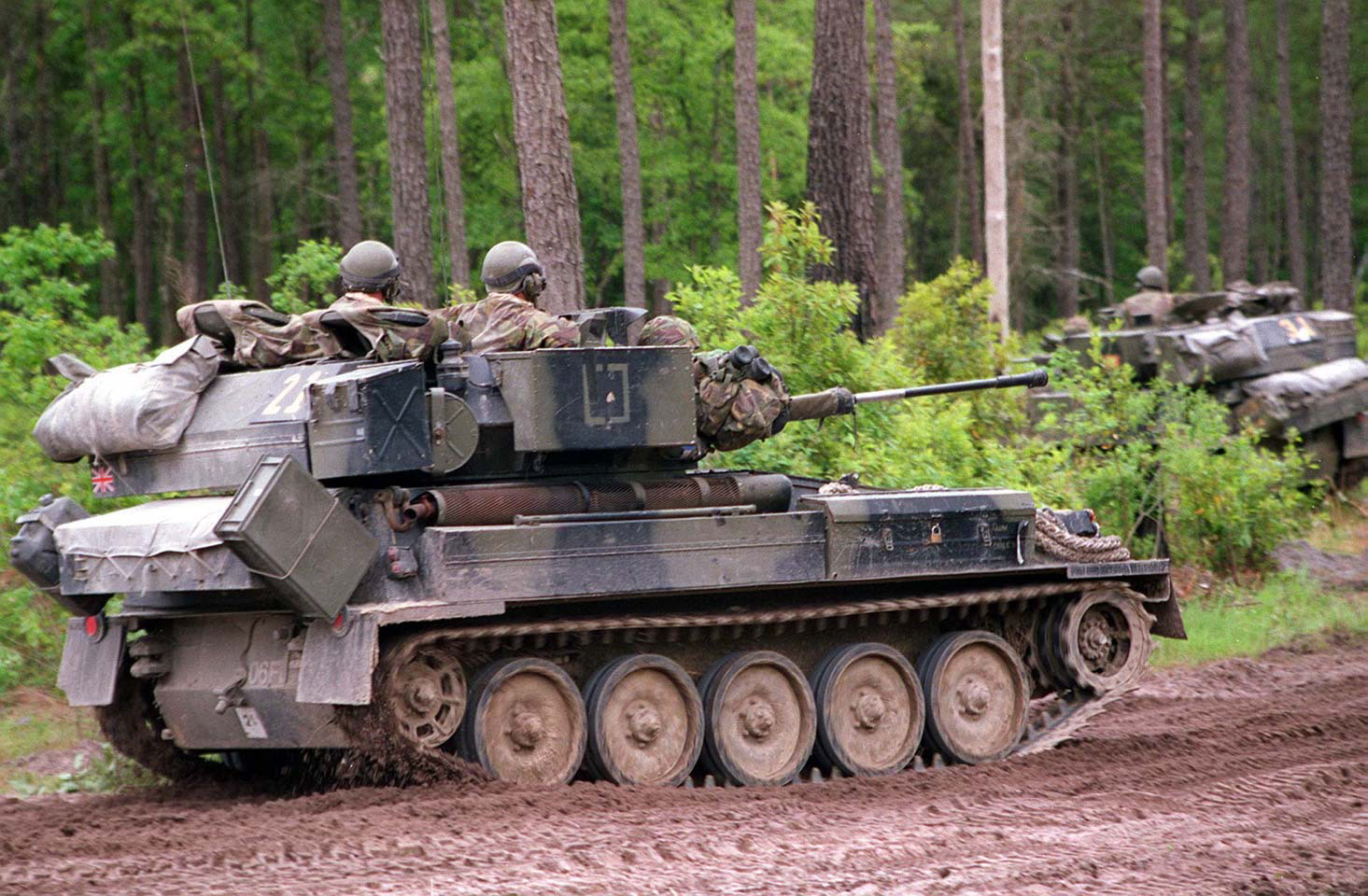
Scimitar vehicles previously used by the Fife and Forfar Yeomanry/Scottish Horse Squadron

The regiment was formed by the amalgamation of the Fife and Forfar Yeomanry and the Scottish Horse on 1 November 1956. In 1967 the regiment was put into suspended animation (and not allowed to recruit).

In 1969 the squadron was reduced to a cadre strength and became sponsored by 153 (Highland) Transport Regiment. The cadre was disbanded in 1975. However, the lineage was revived when C (Fife and Forfar Yeomanry/Scottish Horse) Squadron, the Scottish Yeomanry, was formed with a reconnaissance role in 1992. The squadron transferred to the Queen's Own Yeomanry in 1999.

The unit's guidon was paraded at a ceremony to mark the receipt of the Queen's Own Yeomanry's first guidon from the Prince of Wales in 2007. The squadron transferred from the Queen's Own Yeomanry to the Scottish and North Irish Yeomanry in 2013.

The squadron operates in a light cavalry role and is primarily equipped with the Land Rover RWMIK reconnaissance vehicle.

== Decorations and awards ==
The squadron inherited one Victoria Cross winner from its predecessor regiments: Lieutenant Colonel William English, who was awarded the Victoria Cross for his actions in 1901 in South Africa whilst serving as a lieutenant in the Scottish Horse.

== Notable members of the regiment ==
Notable members of the regiment include Robert AG Douglas-Miller, the one-time owner of Jenners department store in Edinburgh.

== Honorary Colonels and Commanding Officers ==
Honorary colonels and commanding officers have been as follows:

	Honorary Colonels	Commanding Officers/ Officer Commanding
The FFY/SH Regiment (1956–1967)	Col R Appleby Bartram MC TD DL(1956-1957); Col Earl of Lindsay DL(1957-1962); Col RMTC Campbell-Preston OBE MC TD JP DL (1962-1967); Col Sir William Walker Kt. TD DL	Lt Colonel HRS Stewart TD; Lt Colonel N Mathewson TD; Lt Colonel M Anstice MC
The FFY/SH Cadre (1967–1975)	Col Sir William Walker Kt TD DL (1967–1969); Col Sir John Gilmour Bt DSO TD JP DL MP	Maj MGN Walker (1969-1972); Maj IS Taylor TD (1972-1975)
The FFY/SH Suspended Animation (1975–1992)	None	None
C(FFY/SH) Squadron of The Scots Yeo (1992–1999)	Col MJC Anstice MC TD DL	Maj C Roads (1992–1994); Maj I Thornton-Kemsley TD (1994–1996); Maj WHR Wilson (1996–1999)
C(FFY/SH) Squadron of The QOY (1999–present)	Col Sir John Gilmour, 4th Bt (1999–2013); Col Sir James Lindsay 3rd Bt (2018–2024); Col T. E. D. Allen, CBE (2024–2026)	Maj WHR Wilson (1999–2000); Maj NWE Potter TD (2000–2002); Maj MC Hutchinson TD (2002–2007); Maj C Chayko (2007–2008); Maj NWE Potter TD (2008–present)

== Battle honours ==
Fife and Forfar Yeomanry/Scottish Horse holds the combined battle honours of The Fife and Forfar Yeomanry, and Scottish Horse. This table shows the squadron's battle honours and which regiment they originate from:

	Battle Honours of the FFY/SH	Battle Honours of the Fife and Forfar Yeomanry	Battle Honours of the Scottish Horse
Second Boer War	South Africa 1900–02	South Africa 1900–01	South Africa 1900–02
First World War	Somme 1918; Bapaume 1918; Hindenburg Line; Épehy; Beaurevoir; Selle; Sambre; Pursuit to Mons; France and Flanders 1918; Macedonia 1916–18; Gallipoli 1915; Rumani; Egypt 1915–17; Gaza; Jerusalem; Tell 'Asur; Palestine 1917–18	Somme 1918; Bapaume 1918; Hindenburg Line; Épehy Pursuit to Mons; France and Flanders 1918 Gallipoli 1915 Egypt 1915–17; Gaza; Jerusalem; Tell 'Asur; Palestine 1917–18	Beaurevoir; Selle; Sambre France and Flanders 1918; Macedonia 1916–18; Gallipoli 1915; Rumani; Egypt 1915–16
Second World War	Dunkirk; Cheux; Bourguebus Ridge; Le Perier Ridge; Scheldt; Ourthe; Rhineland; Rhine; North-West Europe 1940, 44-45; Honorary Distinction: Badge of the Royal Regiment of Artillery with year-dates "1943–45" and three scrolls: "North-West Europe", "Sicily" and "Italy"	Dunkirk; Cheux; Bourguebus Ridge; Le Perier Ridge; Scheldt; Ourthe; Rhineland; Rhine; North-West Europe 1940, 44-45	Honorary Distinction: Badge of the Royal Regiment of Artillery with year-dates "1943–45" and three scrolls: "North-West Europe", "Sicily" and "Italy"

== Uniform ==
The cap badge of the Fife and Forfar Yeomanry/Scottish Horse is a mounted knight (The Thane of Fife) with a cross of St Andrew behind. The cross contains both laurel and juniper leaves.

== Alliances ==
Alliances are as follows:

- Scotland - Atholl Highlanders
- Australia - 1st/15th Royal New South Wales Lancers
- South Africa - Solomon Mahlangu Regiment

== See also ==
- Category:Fife and Forfar Yeomanry/Scottish Horse officers
- No. 679 (The Duke of Connaught's) Squadron AAC
