= 154 (Scottish) Regiment RLC =

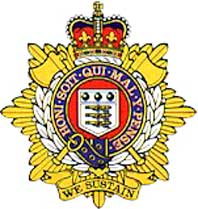
- Cap Badge of the Royal Logistic Corps
- Active: 1993–Present
- Country: United Kingdom
- Branch: British Army
- Type: Logistic Regiment
- Role: 3rd Line Transport
- Size: Regiment; 431 personnel
- Part of: 4th Light Brigade Combat Team
- Motto: We Sustain
- March: Quick March - On Parade; Slow March -Lion, Sword and Crown
- Anniversaries: Formation Day 5 Apr
- Equipment: MAN SV
- Battle honours: Peninsula; Battle of Waterloo; Lucknow; Taku Forts; Peking

Commanders
- Current commander: Lieutenant Colonel Chloe O'Brien RLC
- Ceremonial chief: The Princess Royal
- Colonel of the Regiment: Col Gordon Stewart

Insignia
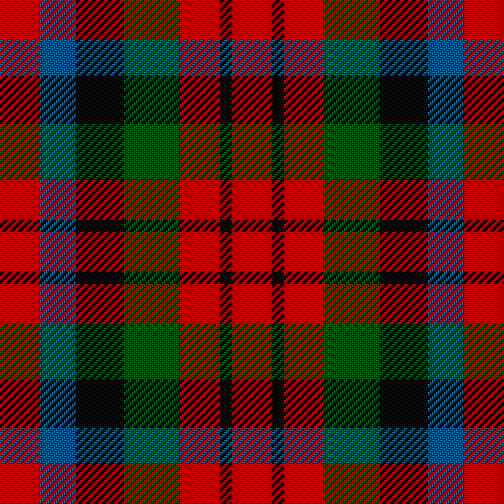
- Regimental Tartan (No. 16, MacDuff)

- Tactical Recognition Flash
- Abbreviation: 154 Regt RLC

154 (Scottish) Regiment is a regiment of the British Army's Royal Logistic Corps. It forms part of the Army Reserve. Its role is to provide general transport support at 'third line' for the British Army.

== History ==
The regiment was formed as the 154th (Lowland) Regiment, RCT (Volunteers) in Glasgow in 1967. The initially comprised just 221 Squadron and 222 Squadron. 225 Squadron was formed in 1969, 251 Squadron in 1971 and 225 Squadron in 1992. 527 Squadron, 230 Squadron and 231 Squadron and 251 Squadron were added on amalgamation with 153 (Highland) Transport Regiment to form the Scottish Transport Regiment in 1993. 231 Squadron was subsequently disbanded. It became 154 (Scottish) Regiment RLC under the Army 2020 reforms and an extra squadron, 239 Squadron, was formed in 2016.

== Structure ==
The regiment's structure is:

- Regimental Headquarters, in Dunfermline
- 527 Headquarters Squadron, in Dunfermline
- 221 Transport Squadron, in Glasgow
- 230 Transport Squadron, in Edinburgh
- 239 Transport Squadron, in Fife
- 251 Transport Squadron, in Irvine

== Uniform ==
The regiment wears the Tactical Recognition Flash of the Royal Logistic Corps.

The tartan of the regiment is a version (designated "Government No. 16") of the main MacDuff tartan, but with a smaller green area, worn by unit's pipers and drummers; in regular uniform, it is only used for the diamond-shaped cockade backing the badge on the uniform cap. A tartan was created in 2018 (approved in 2020) in honour of the Royal Logistic Corps, but this is for civilian use and is a fundraiser for the RLC's MOD Benevolent fund; it is not used for regimental uniform.

== See also ==
- Armed forces in Scotland
- Military history of Scotland
