= William John English =

Recipient of the Victoria Cross

William John English VC
- Lt Col Wm J English VC
- Born: 6 October 1882; Cork, Ireland
- Died: 4 July 1941 (aged 58); At sea, near Egypt
- Burial place: Maala Cemetery, Aden, Yemen
- Military career
- Allegiance: United Kingdom
- Branch: British Army
- Service years: 1900–1941
- Rank: Lieutenant Colonel
- Units: The Scottish Horse; 2nd Dragoon Guards; Royal Army Service Corps; Royal Ulster Rifles
- Conflicts: Second Boer War; World War I World War II
- Awards: Victoria Cross; Mérite agricole (French) (4th Class)

William John English VC (6 October 1882 – 4 July 1941) was an Irish born recipient of the Victoria Cross, the highest and most prestigious award for gallantry in the face of the enemy that can be awarded to British and Commonwealth forces.

== Details ==
English was educated at Harvey Grammar School in Folkestone, Kent from 1894 to 1898 and Campbell College, Belfast from 1898 to 1899. The following year he went to South Africa and in November joined the Scottish Horse, a yeomanry regiment raised for service in South Africa. He served in the ranks until he was commissioned in March 1901. He was 18 years old, and a lieutenant in the 2nd Scottish Horse during the Second Boer War when the following deed took place on 3 July 1901 at Vlakfontein, South Africa, for which he was awarded the VC:

This Officer with five men was holding the right of a position at Vlakfontein on the 3rd July, 1901, during an attack by the Boers. Two of his men were killed and two wounded, but the position was still held, largely owing to Lieutenant English's personal pluck. When the ammunition ran short he went over to the next party and obtained more; to do this he had to cross some 15 yards of open ground under a heavy fire at a range of from 20 to 30 yards.

Following the end of the war, he went to the United Kingdom and received the decoration in person from the Prince of Wales during a large coronation parade of colonial troops in London on 1 July 1902.

== Later life ==
He was commissioned in the Royal Army Service Corps in 1906 from the 2nd Dragoon Guards. He later achieved the rank of lieutenant colonel. He saw action in three major wars (Second Boer War, World War I and World War II. He died of a cerebral haemorrhage, on board a ship near Egypt, on active service with the Royal Ulster Rifles in 1941. He is buried in Maala Cemetery, Aden (now Yemen).

== The medal ==
His medal group (including the VC) was bequeathed to his former school, Campbell College, Belfast. His medals included the Queen's South Africa Medal and 5 Bars (Cape Colony, Orange Free State, Transvaal, South Africa 1901 and South Africa 1902), 1914 Star with Ribbon Bar (5 August to 22 November 1914), British War Medal, Victory Medal, 1939–1945 Star, Africa Star, 1939–45 War Medal, King Edward VII Coronation Medal (with Military Ribbon), King George VI Coronation Medal.

The medal group has been lent by their owners, Campbell College, for a 10-year period, from 2010, to the Imperial War Museum, London as part of their Victoria Cross and George Cross Collection.
