= Scottish Yeomanry =

The Scottish Yeomanry
- Cap Badge of The Scottish Yeomanry
- Active: 1992-1999
- Country: United Kingdom
- Branch: British Army
- Type: Yeomanry
- Role: Light reconnaissance
- Size: One Regiment
- Part of: Royal Armoured Corps
- Regimental Headquarters: Inchdrewer House
- Motto(s): All seeing
- March: The Garb of Old Gaul
- Vehicles: Land Rover Defender

Commanders
- Honorary Colonel 1992-97: Lieutenant General Sir Norman Arthur KCB JP
- Honorary Colonel 1997-99: Brigadier Melville Jameson CBE DL

Insignia
- Abbreviation: SCOTS YEO
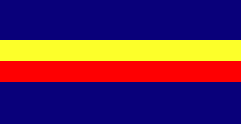
- Stable Belt Colours

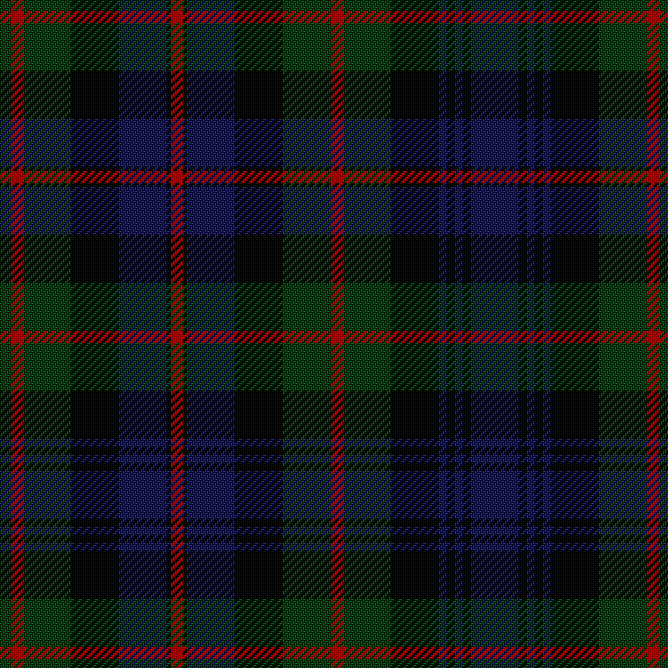
- Regimental Tartan (Murray of Atholl)
- Tartan: Murray of Atholl

The Scottish Yeomanry (SCOTS YEO) was a Yeomanry Regiment of the British Territorial Army formed in 1992. It was disbanded in 1999.

== History ==
The Scottish Yeomanry was raised on 1 November 1992 as a result of Options for Change with headquarters at Inchdrewer House, Colinton Road, Edinburgh by transfer and resuscitation of old regiments as squadrons. The regiment consisted of a headquarters and three sabre squadrons:

- "HQ" (Lothians and Border Horse) Squadron (Edinburgh) was formed by the re-roling of 225 Squadron, 154 (Lowland) Regiment Royal Corps of Transport.
- "A" (Ayrshire (Earl of Carrick's Own) Yeomanry) Squadron (Ayr) was transferred into the new regiment from the QOY where they had been serving on both CVR(W) Fox and other CVR(T) variants.
- "B" (Lanarkshire and Queen's Own Royal Glasgow Yeomanry) Squadron (East Kilbride) was formed by the re-roling of 222 Squadron, 154 (Lowland) Regiment Royal Corps of Transport.
- "C" (Fife and Forfar Yeomanry/Scottish Horse) Squadron (Cupar) was formed by the re-roling of 239 (Highland Yeomanry) Squadron, 153 (Highland) Regiment Royal Corps of Transport. Until 1999 "C" Squadron also maintained part of the lineage of the Lovat Scouts.

On 1 July 1999, following the Strategic Defence Review, elements were of the regiment ("A" and "C" Squadrons) were transferred to the Queen's Own Yeomanry. "B" Squadron was re-roled to become 52 Squadron of 32 Signal Regiment and HQ Squadron and regimental headquarters disbanded.

== Uniform ==
The Scottish Yeomanry wore a grey beret of the Royal Scots Dragoon Guards bearing a cap badge of the regiment consisting of the Lion Rampant of Scotland upon crossed lances under the Scottish Crown.

The officers and men of the regiment wore the Duke of Atholl's Tartan, Murray of Atholl, in various forms of dress. The regimental stable belt which was adopted was a reversed version of the Ayrshire Yeomanry belt. This looked exactly like the 15th/19th The King's Royal Hussars' belt.
