= Scottish Horse =

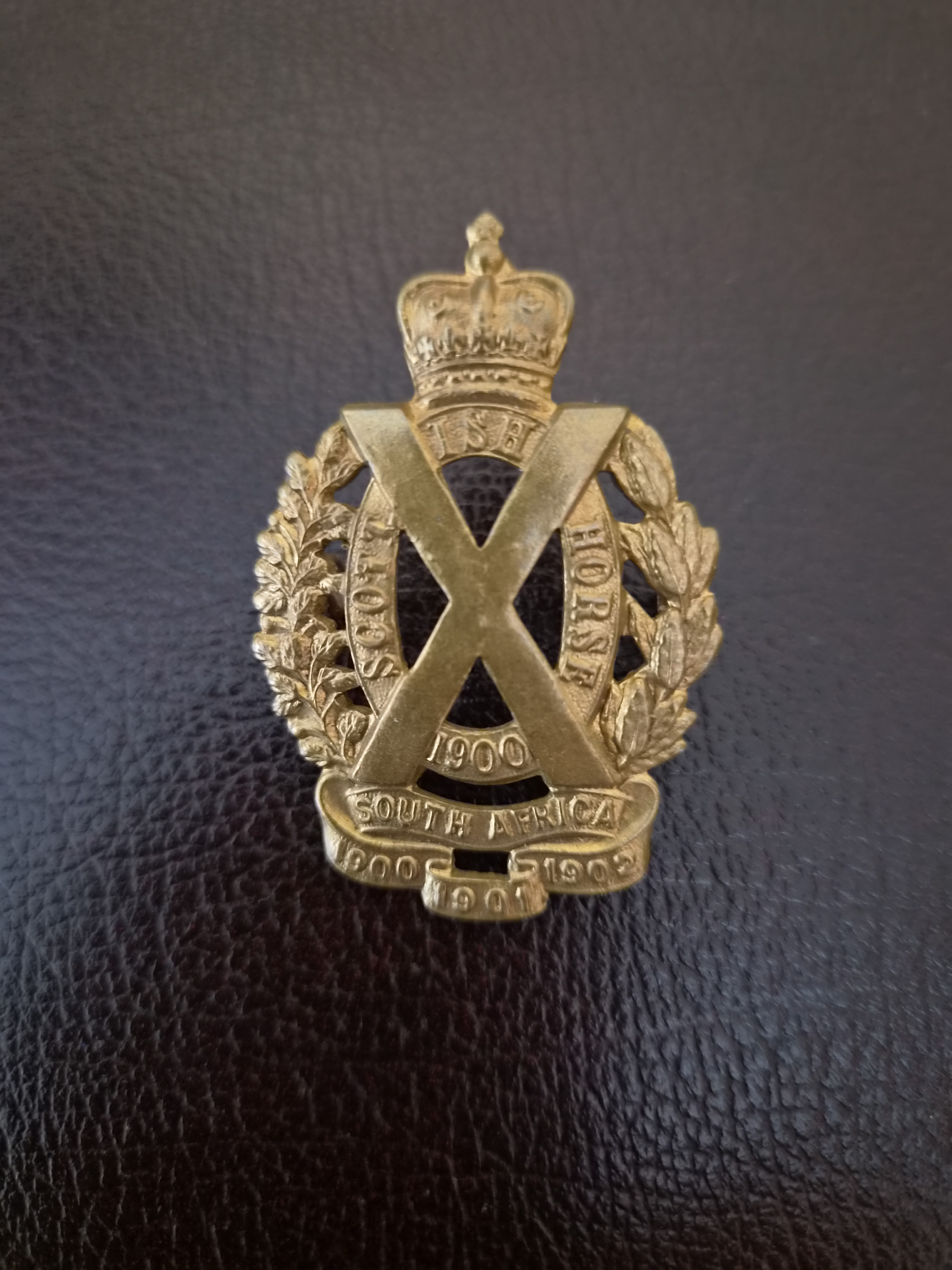
- Cap badge of the Scottish Horse.
- Active: 1900–1956
- Country: United Kingdom
- Branch: British Army
- Type: Yeomanry
- Role: Formation Reconnaissance; Infantry; Artillery; Army Air Corps
- Size: Battalion
- Colors: Black and Gold
- March: The Scottish Horse; The Garb of Old Gaul
- Engagements: Anzio
- Battle honours: Second Boer War; 1900 – 1902 South Africa; First World War; Beaurevoir; Selle; Sambre; France & Flanders; Macedonia (1916–18); Gallipoli (1915); Romani; Egypt (1915–16); Second World War; North West Europe; Sicily & Italy

Commanders
- Notable commanders: Henry Peregrine Leader

Insignia
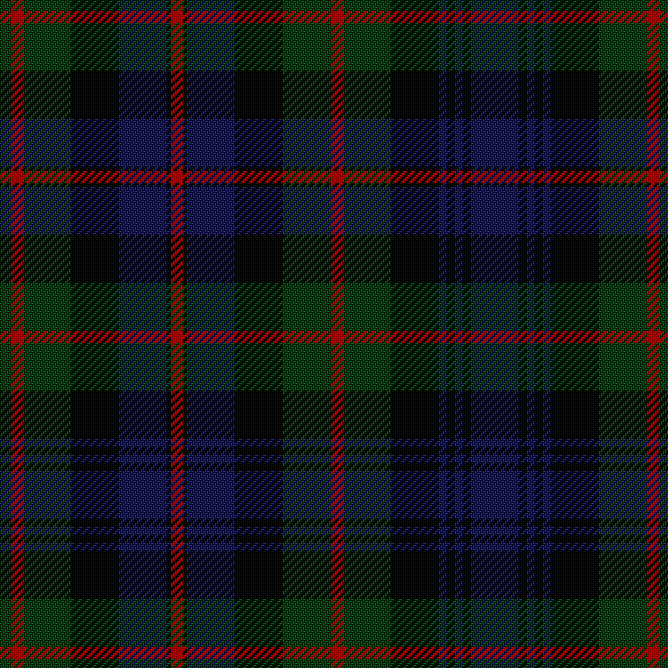
- Regimental Tartan (Murray of Atholl)

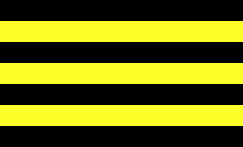
- Stable Belt Colours

The Scottish Horse was a Yeomanry regiment of the British Army's Territorial Army raised in 1900 for service in the Second Boer War. It saw heavy fighting in both the First World War, as the 13th Battalion, Black Watch, and in the Second World War, as part of the Royal Artillery. It amalgamated with the Fife and Forfar Yeomanry to form the Fife and Forfar Yeomanry/Scottish Horse in 1956. The lineage is maintained by "C" Fife and Forfar Yeomanry/Scottish Horse Squadron of The Scottish and North Irish Yeomanry based in Cupar in Fife.

== History ==
=== Formation and early history ===
In late 1900, the Marquess of Tullibardine was in asked by Lord Kitchener, whom he had served under on the Omdurman Campaign, to raise a regiment of Scotsmen in South Africa, called The Scottish Horse. The regiment was raised quickly and soon saw active service in the Western Transvaal. A second regiment of Scottish Horse was raised from troops recruited by the 7th Duke of Atholl. After the war ended in June 1902, 780 officers and men of the regiments left Cape Town in the SS Goth and arrived in Southampton in late August. Both regiments were subsequently disbanded at Edinburgh Castle on 1 September 1902, after repatriating Australians and discharging South Africans.

Later in 1902, The Scottish Horse was reconstituted as two regiments by the Duke of Atholl, both claiming descent from the original Scottish Horse, a British Army Regiment and a volunteer Regiment in Transvaal Army: the latter unit was disbanded in 1907.

The British Army regiment was re-constituted in 1903 as the Scottish Horse Imperial Yeomanry with headquarters in the High Street in Dunkeld. It was made the county Yeomanry Regiment for Perthshire, Aberdeenshire, Elgin, Nairn and Argyll. By 1908, it had been renamed the Scottish Horse and had been expanded to two regiments (eight squadrons in total) with its headquarters at Dunkeld co-located with the headquarters of the 1st Regiment. The regiments were trained and equipped as dragoons.

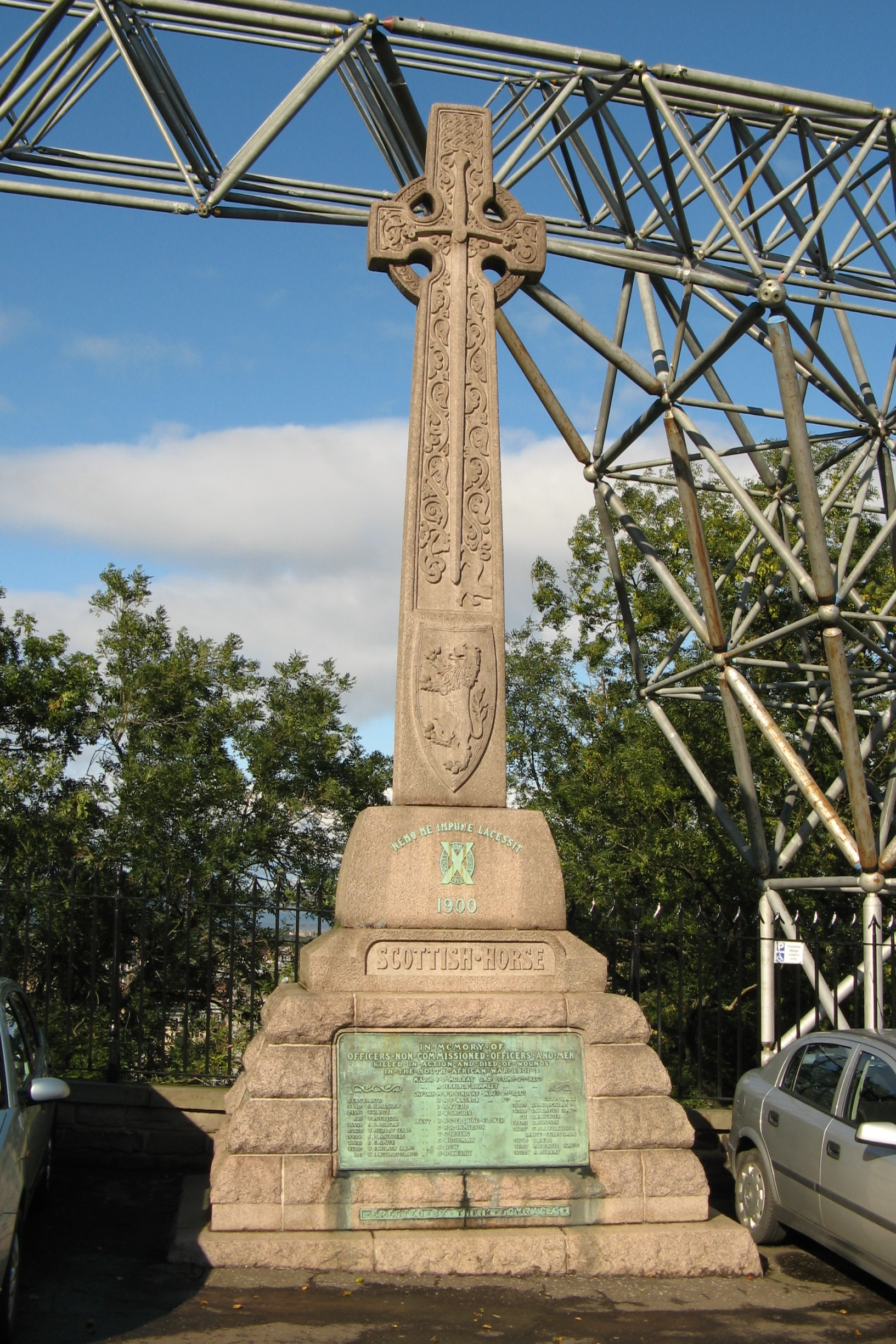
The Scottish Horse Boer War memorial in Edinburgh

	1st Scottish Horse (Yeomanry for Perthshire)		2nd Scottish Horse (Yeomanry for Aberdeenshire, Elgin, Nairn, and Argyllshire)
HQ	Dunkeld	HQ	Aberdeen
A Squadron	Blair Atholl (dets at Ballinluig, Pitlochry, Kirkmichael, Kinloch Rannoch)	E Squadron	Elgin (dets at Pluscarden, Craigellachie, Cullen, Dallas, Dufftown, Forres, Keith, Archiestown)
B Squadron	Dunkeld (dets at Murthly, Bankfoot, Dupplin, Perth, Cluny, Aberfeldy)	F Squadron	Kintore (dets at Peterhead, Fraserburgh, Ellon, Huntly, Insch, Inverurie, Monymusk, Cluny, Alford, Turriff, Fyvie, Rothie-Norman, Maud, Mintlaw, Newmachar, Bucksburn)
C Squadron	Coupar Angus (dets at Blairgowrie, Alyth, Invergowrie)	G Squadron	Aberdeen (dets at Torphins, Aboyne, Tarland, Ballater, Braemar)
D Squadron	Dunblane (dets at Crieff, Comrie, Lochearnhead, Auchterarder, Muthill, Dunning, Methven)	H Squadron	Connel, Argyll (dets at Kilchrenan, Appin, Easdale, Ardrishaig, Taynuilt, Calgary (Mull), Tiree, Craignure (Mull), Campbeltown, Bunessan (Mull), Torloisk (Mull), Port Ellen, Port Charlotte, Bowmore, Bridghead)

=== First World War ===
In accordance with the Territorial and Reserve Forces Act 1907 (7 Edw. 7, c.9) which brought the Territorial Force into being, the TF was intended to be a home defence force for service during wartime and members could not be compelled to serve outside the country. However, on the outbreak of war on 4 August 1914, many members volunteered for Imperial Service. Therefore, TF units were split in August and September 1914 into 1st Line (liable for overseas service) and 2nd Line (home service for those unable or unwilling to serve overseas) units. Later, a 3rd Line was formed to act as a reserve, providing trained replacements for the 1st and 2nd Line regiments.

==== 1/1st, 1/2nd and 1/3rd Scottish Horse ====
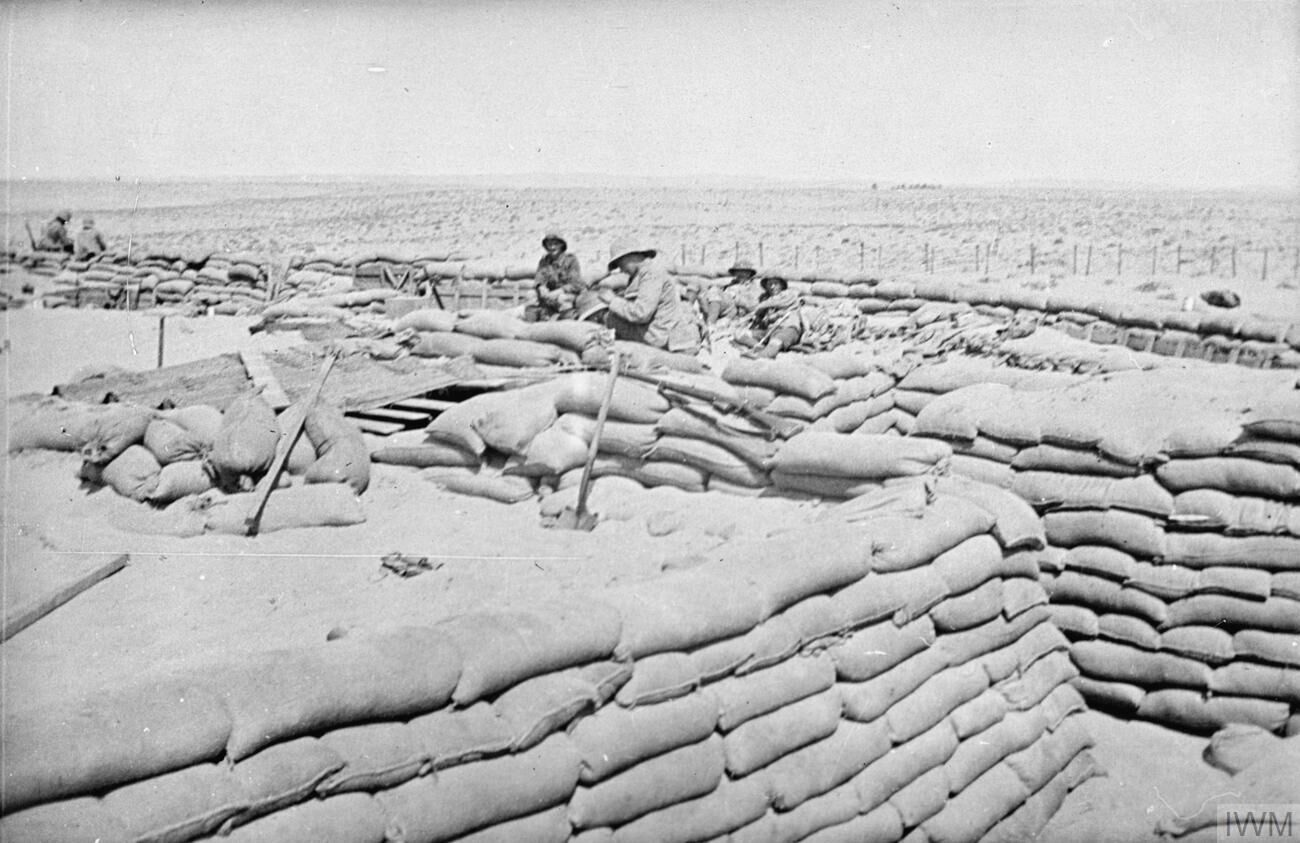
1st Regiment Scottish Horse constructing a redoubt at Duadar, Summer 1916

The 1st and 2nd Scottish Horse were expanded with the creation of the 3rd Regiment in August 1914 and the Scottish Horse Mounted Brigade was then formed with these three regiments in September 1914. By January 1915, the Scottish Horse Mounted Brigade was attached to the 63rd (2nd Northumbrian) Division on coastal defence duties in the UK. By August 1915 the regiments were ready for foreign service and took part in dismounted landings at Suvla Bay, Gallipoli on 2 September 1915, attached to 2nd Mounted Division. December 1915 saw the 1st, 2nd and 3rd Regiments evacuated from Gallipoli and moved to Egypt. Due to heavy casualties, the Scottish Horse Brigade was absorbed into 1st Dismounted Brigade on Suez Canal defences in February 1916.

On 29 September 1916, the 1st and 2nd Regiments formed an infantry battalion. Just over two weeks later, on 15 October 1916, it became known as the 13th (Scottish Horse Yeomanry) Battalion, the Black Watch. The 13th (Scottish Horse Yeomanry) Battalion of The Black Watch was sent to fight in Salonika as part of the 81st Brigade in 27th Division.

The 3rd Regiment was formed into the 26th (Scottish Horse) Squadron, the Machine Gun Corps and continued to serve in Egypt before being re-titled as a company and posted to the Lovat's Scouts Battalion of the Cameron Highlanders. In June 1918, with victory looming on the Macedonia front, the unit was transferred to the 149th Brigade, 50th Division on the Western Front, where it remained until the end of the war.

==== 2/1st, 2/2nd and 2/3rd Scottish Horse ====
Three 2nd Line regiments were formed in August and September 1914 at Dunkeld and Aberdeen. They moved to Kettering, Northamptonshire and formed 2/1st Scottish Horse Mounted Brigade. At the end of 1915, they moved to Alford, Lincolnshire. On 31 March 1916, the remaining Mounted Brigades were numbered in a single sequence. As a consequence, the 2/1st Scottish Horse Mounted Brigade was redesignated as 19th Mounted Brigade, in Northern Command.

In July 1916, the regiments were converted to cyclists (and the brigade became 12th Cyclist Brigade, later 8th Cyclist Brigade) still in Lincolnshire. At the end of 1917, they moved to Fife with the regiments at Ladybank (2/1st), St Andrews (2/2nd) and Cupar (2/3rd). In April 1918, they moved to Ireland and the regiments were stationed at Limerick (2/1st), Lahinch (2/2nd) and Tulla (2/3rd) where they remained until the end of the war.

==== 3/1st, 3/2nd and 3/3rd Scottish Horse ====
Three 3rd Line regiments were formed at Dunkeld around May 1915. In the summer of 1915, they were affiliated to a Reserve Cavalry Regiment at Aldershot and in June 1916 they returned to Dunkeld. The regiments were disbanded in early 1917 with personnel transferring to the 2nd Line units or to the 4th (Reserve) Battalion of the Black Watch at Ripon.

=== Between the wars ===
Post war, a commission was set up to consider the shape of the Territorial Force (Territorial Army from 1 October 1921). The experience of the First World War made it clear that cavalry was surfeit. The commission decided that only the 14 most senior regiments were to be retained as cavalry. Eight regiments were converted to Armoured Car Companies of the Royal Tank Corps (RTC), one was reduced to a battery in another regiment, one was absorbed into a local infantry battalion, one became a signals regiment and two were disbanded. The remaining 25 regiments were converted to brigades (Note: The basic organic unit of the Royal Artillery was, and is, the Battery. When grouped together they formed brigades, in the same way that infantry battalions or cavalry regiments were grouped together in brigades. At the outbreak of the First World War, a field artillery brigade of headquarters (4 officers, 37 other ranks), three batteries (5 and 193 each), and a brigade ammunition column (4 and 154) had a total strength just under 800 so was broadly comparable to an infantry battalion (just over 1,000) or a cavalry regiment (about 550). Like an infantry battalion, an artillery brigade was usually commanded by a lieutenant colonel. Artillery brigades were redesignated as regiments in 1938.) of the Royal Field Artillery between 1920 and 1922. The Scottish Horse was reduced to a single regiment, but remained mounted as a "scouts" unit – as did the Lovat Scouts.

=== Second World War ===
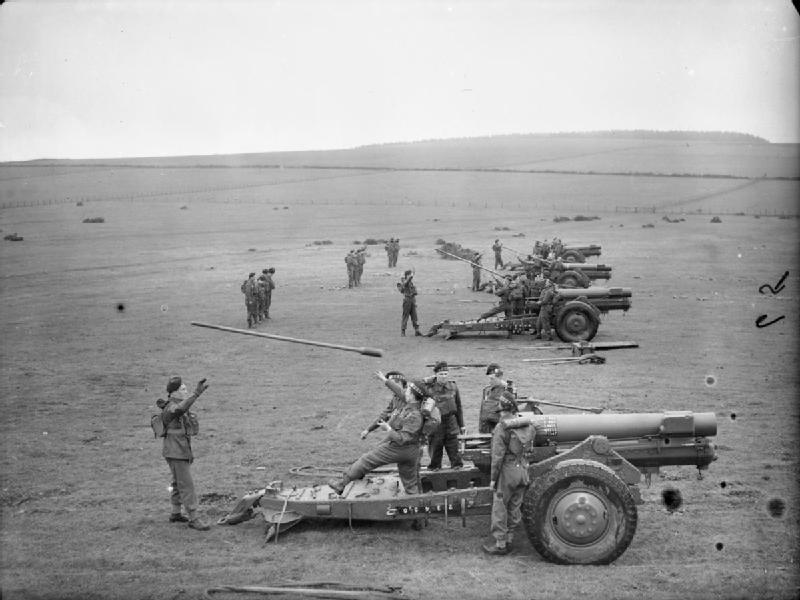
Howitzers of the 79th (The Scottish Horse) Medium Regiment during a training exercise, Banffshire, Scotland (May 1941)

The regiment started the war as reconnaissance mounted cavalry. However, the horses were withdrawn at Dunkeld and, after a brief wait. the Scottish Horse was formally dismounted. In 1940, The Scottish Horse Regiment was split to become the 79th (The Scottish Horse) Medium Regiment, Royal Artillery and the 80th (The Scottish Horse) Medium Regiment, Royal Artillery. The 80th Medium Regiment served as part of 6th Army Group Royal Artillery in the Italian Campaign.

=== Post War ===
In 1947, the Scottish Horse rejoined the Territorial Army list with its HQ back at Dunkeld. It was transferred from the Royal Artillery to become part of the Royal Armoured Corps. At this time, the regiment was made up of two squadrons of Scottish Horse and the third from the Lovat Scouts. This merger was to be short lived and, by 1949, the Lovat Scouts had been roled as artillery, leaving both the Scottish Horse and The Royal Armoured Corps. In 1956, an amalgamation was announced with the Fife and Forfar Yeomanry and, on 31 October 1956, the Scottish Horse became part of a new regiment known as the Fife and Forfar Yeomanry/Scottish Horse.

== Victoria Cross ==
Lt Col English VC

The Victoria Cross is the highest and most prestigious award for gallantry in the face of the enemy that can be awarded to British and Commonwealth forces. Lt William John English (later Lt Col) was awarded the Victoria Cross for his heroism on 3 July 1901 in South Africa whilst serving as a lieutenant in The Scottish Horse. The citation read:

This officer, with five men, was holding the position at Vlakfontein on 3 July 1901 during an attack by the Boers. Two of his men were killed and two wounded, but the position was still held, largely owing to the lieutenant's personal pluck. When the ammunition ran short, he went over to the next party and obtained more; to do so he had to cross some 15 yards of open ground, under a heavy fire at a range of from 20 to 30 yards.

== Battle honours ==
The battle honours of the Scottish Horse are displayed on the guidon which are now laid up in Dunkeld Cathedral. The battle honours were carried forward on to the guidon of the Fife and Forfar Yeomanry/Scottish Horse and are represented today on the guidon of the Queen's Own Yeomanry. The Scottish Horse was awarded the following battle honours (honours in bold are emblazoned on the regimental colours):

Second Boer War	**South Africa 1900–02**	Honorary Distinction from the Second World War, awarded to the Shropshire Yeomanry for service as a Royal Artillery regiment. The Scottish Horse Honorary Distinction would be similar.
First World War	**Beaurevoir**, **Selle**, **Sambre**, **France and Flanders 1918**, **Macedonia 1916–18**, **Gallipoli 1915**, **Rumani**, **Egypt 1915–16**	Honorary Distinction from the Second World War, awarded to the Shropshire Yeomanry for service as a Royal Artillery regiment. The Scottish Horse Honorary Distinction would be similar.
Second World War	The Royal Artillery was present in nearly all battles and would have earned most of the honours awarded to cavalry and infantry regiments. In 1833, William IV awarded the motto Ubique (meaning "everywhere") in place of all battle honours. Honorary Distinction: Badge of the Royal Regiment of Artillery with year-dates "1943–45" and three scrolls: "North-West Europe", "Sicily" and "Italy"	Honorary Distinction from the Second World War, awarded to the Shropshire Yeomanry for service as a Royal Artillery regiment. The Scottish Horse Honorary Distinction would be similar.

== Honorary Colonels and Commanding Officers ==
	List of Colonel Commandant (1900–1920)/ Honorary Colonels (1920–1956)	List of Commanding Officers
South Africa (1900–02)	The Duke of Atholl KT PC GCVO CB DSO	
Imperial Yeomanry (1902–1914)	The Duke of Atholl KT PC GCVO CB DSO	
The Great War (1914–1919)	The Duke of Atholl KT PC GCVO CB DSO	
Scouts and Yeomanry (1920–39)	The Duke of Atholl KT PC GCVO CB DSO	Lt Col RA Bartram MC
79th Medium Regiment, Royal Artillery (1939–45)	The Duke of Atholl KT PC GCVO CB DSO; The Duchess of Atholl DBE DCL LL.D FRCM	Lt Col RA Bartram MC
80th Medium Regiment, Royal Artillery (1939–45)	The Duke of Atholl KT PC GCVO CB DSO; The Duchess of Atholl DBE DCL LL.D FRCM	Lt Col RMT Campbell-Preston
Armoured Reconnaissance (1947–56)	The Duchess of Atholl DBE DCL LL.D FRCM; Col RA Bartram MC	Lt Col TG Cooper 4/7 DG; Lt Col Lindsay DSO; Lt Col RMT Campbell-Preston; Lt Col M Lyle

Other notable Commanders and Soldiers

- Lieut-Colonel William Anstruther-Gray FSA JP DL (6 September 1859 – 17 April 1938)
- Sir Frederick Charles Thomson, 1st Baronet, KC (27 May 1875 – 21 April 1935)
- John Baird, 1st Viscount Stonehaven Bt, GCMG, DSO, PC, JP, DL (27 April 1874 – 20 August 1941) British Conservative politician, and the eighth Governor-General of Australia
- Sir James Ramsay Montagu Butler (20 July 1889 – 1 March 1975) was a British politician and academic
- Jock Wilson – (7 September 1903 – 29 September 2008) was a British serviceman, who was Great Britain's oldest D-Day veteran
- Noel Skelton (1 July 1880 – 22 November 1935) was a Scottish Unionist politician
- Willie Thornton MM - (3 March 1920 – 26 August 1991) was a Scottish footballer and manager.
- William Wolfe – (22 February 1924 – 18 March 2010) was leader of the Scottish National Party from 1969 to 1979

== Seniority in The British Army ==
This table shows how the regiment's place in the Army List moved through its history

Year	Preceded by	Title	Followed By
1913	The Lovat Scouts (Dragoons)	The Scottish Horse (Dragoons)	unknown
1916	12th (Labour) Bn of the Black Watch	13th (Scottish Horse) Bn of the Black Watch	14th (Fife and Forfar Yeomanry) Bn of the Black Watch
1939	78th (Duke of Lancaster's Own Yeomanry); Medium Regt of RA	79th and 80th (Scottish Horse); Medium Regt of RA	84th (Sussex); Medium Regt of RA
1955	East Riding of Yorkshire Yeomanry (Royal Armoured Corps)	The Scottish Horse (Royal Armoured Corps)	Royal Regiment of Artillery(Volunteers)

== Uniform and accoutrements ==
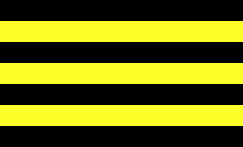
Scottish Horse stable belt

A Scottish Horse Slouch Hat in the Transvaal Scottish Museum

The Scottish Horse Imperial Yeomanry Badge as worn during the Boer War

The regiment wore a slouch hat with kakhi and black silk in the pogri (only the Commanding Officer would wear the silk Murray of Atholl tartan in the pogri) bearing a cap badge with backing of yellow/red or blue (depending on if with soldier was in 1st 2nd or 3rd Regiment) and black cock feather. The cap badge cross of St Andrew with a sprig of laurel on one side and a branch of juniper leaves on the other.

The officers and men of the regiment wore the Duke of Atholl's Tartan, Murray of Atholl, in various forms of dress. However, the pipers (known as trumpeters on the establishment) wore the Tullibardaine Tartan. The stable belt was black with three gold stripes – colours taken from The Duke of Atholl's arms.

The newly raised Scottish Horse appeared in full dress uniform for the first time in May 1903, on the occasion of a visit by King Edward VII to Edinburgh. The new uniform comprised the slouch hat shown above, a light khaki-drab tunic piped in yellow and khaki overalls (tight fitting cavalry trousers) also with yellow piping. The shade of yellow used was that of the body of the Scottish Standard. This uniform, worn for both parade and ordinary duties, was practical and smart but plain by the standards of the period.

In 1908 a more elaborate full dress was adopted in "Atholl Grey" (a light grey with slightly violet tint). Tunic and overalls were in this distinctive colour, with collars, shoulder straps, piping and trouser stripes in yellow. The slouch hat continued to be worn, with black cock's tail feathers. This uniform was worn by all ranks for ceremonial and church parades, plus walking out dress for other ranks, until the outbreak of war in 1914. There were also special uniforms for pipers, and for optional mess wear by officers and sergeants.

== Memorials, archives and museums ==
The Scottish Horse Memorial in Dunkeld Cathedral

Memorials to the regiment can be found as follows:

- A memorial to the Scottish Horse and the regimental archive can be found at Dunkeld Cathedral.
- A statue in the shape of a Cross of Iona with a superimposed claymore and lion rampant in bronze and an inscription reading "Nemo me impune lacessit 1900", can be found on the esplanade at Edinburgh Castle.
- Identical to the above is the Scottish Horse War Memorial at Kensington Ridge, Johannesburg.
- An LMS Royal Scot Class express passenger locomotive number 6129 was named after the regiment. It was commissioned in September 1927 and decommissioned in June 1964.

== See also ==
- Imperial Yeomanry
- List of Yeomanry Regiments 1908
- Yeomanry
- Yeomanry order of precedence
- British yeomanry during the First World War
- Second line yeomanry regiments of the British Army
- List of British Army Yeomanry Regiments converted to Royal Artillery
- No. 655 Squadron AAC

== Bibliography ==
- "The Scottish Horse 1900–1946" by The Duchess of Atholl
- "The Scottish Horse 1939–1945" by R A S Barbour MC (History 79th & 80th (Scottish Horse) Medium Regiments Royal Artillery
- "The Scottish Horse 1900–1956" by Lt Col RMT Campbell-Preston
- "The Uniforms of the British Yeomanry Force 1794-1914-The Lovat Scouts & Scottish Horse" by the Robert Ogilby Trust
- Asplin, Kevin. The Roll of the Imperial Yeomanry, Scottish Horse & Lovats Scouts, 2nd Boer war 1899–1902, being an alphabetical listing of 39,800 men of these volunteer forces who enlisted for the 2nd Boer war, listing regimental details, clasps to Queens South Africa medal and casualty status . [Limited ed. of 100 copies]
- Asplin, Kevin. The Roll of the Imperial Yeomanry, Scottish Horse & Lovats Scouts, 2nd Boer war 1899–1902, being an alphabetical listing of 39,800 men of these volunteer forces who enlisted for the 2nd Boer war, listing regimental details, clasps to Queens South Africa medal and casualty status . [2nd ed.] Doncaster : DP&G Publishing
- Price, John E. Southern Cross Scots: the Australian and New Zealand participation in the Marquis of Tullibardine's Scottish Horse during the South African War of 1899–1902, 1992, OCLC 32478734

Additional References not fully devoted to the Regiment

- "A military history of Perthshire 1660–1899" by The Duchess of Atholl
- "A military history of Perthshire 1899–1902" by The Duchess of Atholl
- James, Brigadier E.A. (1978). British Regiments 1914–18. London: Samson Books Limited. ISBN 0-906304-03-2.
- "The sword of the North:Highland memories of the Great War" by Dougald MacEchern
- Mileham, Patrick (1994). The Yeomanry Regiments; 200 Years of Tradition. Edinburgh: Canongate Academic. ISBN 1-898410-36-4.
- Rinaldi, Richard A (2008). Order of Battle of the British Army 1914. Ravi Rikhye. ISBN 978-0-97760728-0.
