= Fife and Forfar Yeomanry =

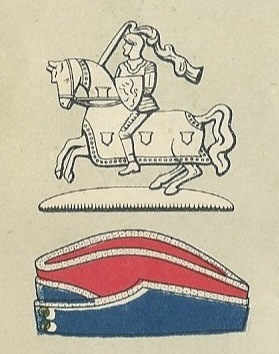
- Cap Badge and service cap
- Active: 1794–1956
- Country: Kingdom of Great Britain (1794–1800); United Kingdom (1801–Present)
- Branch: British Army
- Type: Yeomanry
- Role: Armoured
- Size: One Regiment
- Nicknames: The Fifes; Knife and Forkers
- Mottos: Pro Artis Et Focis; Latin: "for Hearth and Home"
- March: Quick March (band) - Wee Cooper of Fife; Slow March (band) Bonnie Dundee
- Engagements: Second Boer War; World War I Gallipoli 1915 Egypt 1915–17 Palestine 1917–18 France and Flanders 1918 World War II North-West Europe 1940 North-West Europe 1944–45

Insignia
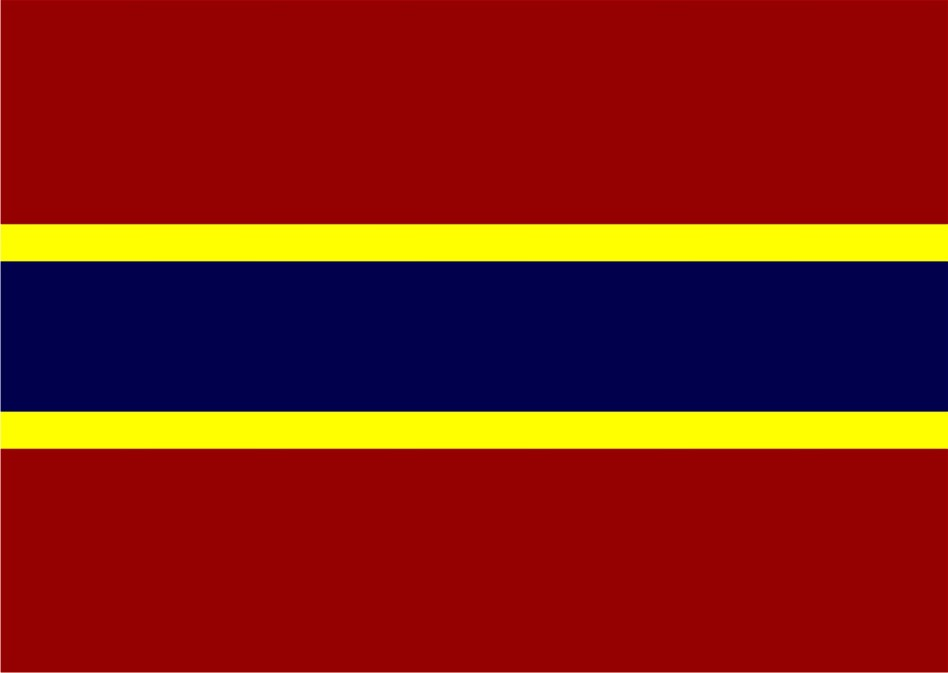
- Regimental Colours

The Fife and Forfar Yeomanry (FFY) was an Armoured Yeomanry Regiment of the British Army formed in 1793. It saw action in the Second Boer War, the First World War and the Second World War. It amalgamated with the Scottish Horse to form the Fife and Forfar Yeomanry/Scottish Horse in 1956. The lineage is maintained by "C" Fife and Forfar Yeomanry/Scottish Horse Squadron of The Scottish and North Irish Yeomanry based in Cupar in Fife.

== History ==
=== Formation and early history ===
The Kirkcaldy Troop was raised in 1797 but, after becoming the Fife Yeomanry Cavalry in 1803, it was disbanded in 1828. The unit was re-raised as the Fife Yeomanry Cavalry in 1831 but was disbanded again in 1838. It was raised again as the 1st Fifeshire Mounted Rifle Volunteer Corps in 1860.

Meanwhile, the Forfar Yeomanry was raised in 1794 but it was also disbanded in 1828. The unit was re-raised as the Forfarshire Yeomanry in 1856 but disbanded again in 1862. It was raised again as the 1st Forfarshire Light Horse Volunteer Corps in 1876.

=== Second Boer War ===
On 13 December 1899, the decision to allow volunteer forces to serve in the Second Boer War was made. Due to the string of defeats during Black Week that same month, the British government realised they were going to need more troops than just the regular army, thus issuing a Royal Warrant on 24 December. This warrant officially created the Imperial Yeomanry (IY). The Royal Warrant asked standing Yeomanry regiments to provide service companies of approximately 115 men each. In addition to this, many British citizens (usually mid-upper class) volunteered to join the new regiment. The two regiments co-sponsored the 20th (Fife and Forfarshire Light Horse) Company, IY, which served in 6th (Scottish) Battalion, IY.

In 1901, the 1st Fifeshire Mounted Rifle Volunteer Corps and the 1st Forfarshire Light Horse Volunteer Corps amalgamated to form the Fifeshire and Forfarshire Imperial Yeomanry. The word "Imperial" was dropped from the title on the formation of the Territorial Force in 1908.

The regiment was based at Hunter Street in Kirkcaldy at this time.

=== First World War ===
In accordance with the Territorial and Reserve Forces Act 1907 (7 Edw. 7, c.9), which brought the Territorial Force into being, the TF was intended to be a home defence force for service during wartime and members could not be compelled to serve outside the country. However, on the outbreak of war on 4 August 1914, many members volunteered for Imperial Service. Therefore, TF units were split in August and September 1914 into 1st Line (liable for overseas service) and 2nd Line (home service for those unable or unwilling to serve overseas) units. Later, a 3rd Line was formed to act as a reserve, providing trained replacements for the 1st and 2nd Line regiments.

==== 1/1st Fife and Forfar Yeomanry ====
They were dismounted and eventually became the 14th (FFY) Battalion of the Black Watch. As part of the 74th (Yeomanry) Division they served in Egypt and Palestine in 1917 and 1918 before moving to France in 1918.

==== 2/1st Fife and Forfar Yeomanry ====
The 2nd Line regiment was formed in September 1914 and in January 1915 was assigned to the 2/1st Highland Mounted Brigade. On 31 March 1916, the remaining Mounted Brigades were ordered to be numbered in a single sequence; the brigade was numbered as 1st Mounted Brigade and joined the 1st Mounted Division in Norfolk. In July 1916, the 1st Mounted Division was reorganised as the 1st Cyclist Division and the regiment was transferred as a mounted unit to the 2nd Mounted Brigade in the new 1st Mounted Division (the former 3rd Mounted Division) in the Brentwood area.

In November 1916, the regiment was converted to a cyclist unit in 6th Cyclist Brigade at Ashington in Northumberland. By July 1917, it was at Acklington and it remained there until early 1918 when it went to Ireland with the 6th Cyclist Brigade. It was stationed at The Curragh until the end of the war.

==== 3/1st Fife and Forfar Yeomanry ====
The 3rd Line regiment was formed in 1915; that summer, it was affiliated to a Reserve Cavalry Regiment at Aldershot. In June 1916, it was at Perth. The regiment was disbanded in early 1917 with personnel transferring to the 2nd Line or to the 4th (Reserve) Battalion of the Black Watch at Ripon.

=== Between the wars ===
On 7 February 1920, the Regiment was reconstituted in the Territorial Army with HQ still at Kirkcaldy. Following the experience of the war, it was decided that only the fourteen most senior yeomanry regiments would be retained as horsed cavalry, with the rest being transferred to other roles. As a result, on 6 January 1921, the Regiment was one of eight (Note: The eight yeomanry regiments converted to Armoured Car Companies of the Royal Tank Corps (RTC) were: 19th (Lothians and Border) Armoured Car Company, Royal Tank Corps from Lothians and Border Horse; 20th (Fife and Forfar) Armoured Car Company, Royal Tank Corps from Fife and Forfar Yeomanry; 21st (Gloucestershire Yeomanry) Armoured Car Company, Royal Tank Corps from Royal Gloucestershire Hussars; 22nd (London) Armoured Car Company (Westminster Dragoons), Royal Tank Corps from Westminster Dragoons; 23rd (London) Armoured Car Company, Royal Tank Corps from 3rd County of London Yeomanry (Sharpshooters); 24th (Derbyshire Yeomanry) Armoured Car Company, Royal Tank Corps from Derbyshire Yeomanry; 25th (Northamptonshire Yeomanry) Armoured Car Company, Royal Tank Corps from Northamptonshire Yeomanry; 26th (East Riding of York Yeomanry) Armoured Car Company, Royal Tank Corps from East Riding Yeomanry) converted and reduced to 2nd (Fife and Forfar) Armoured Car Company, Tank Corps, later renumbered as 20th (Fife and Forfar) Armoured Car Company, Royal Tank Corps. On 30 April 1939, it was transferred to the Royal Armoured Corps.

By 1939, it had become clear that a new European war was likely to break out, and the doubling of the Territorial Army was authorised, with each unit forming a duplicate. The Lothians were expanded to an armoured regiment in August 1939 as the 1st Fife and Forfar Yeomanry and formed a duplicate 2nd Fife and Forfar Yeomanry in the same month.

=== Second World War ===
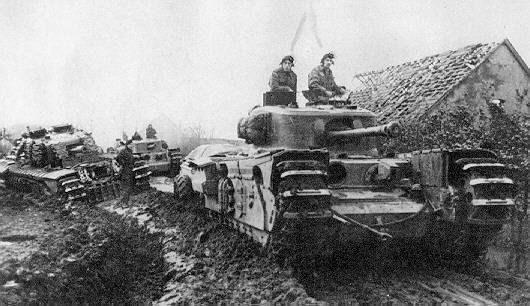
Churchill Crocodile as used by the 1st FFY in World War II

==== 1st Fife and Forfar Yeomanry ====
The 1st Fife and Forfar Yeomanry landed in France as the reconnaissance regiment for the 51st (Highland) Infantry Division in the British Expeditionary Force in September 1939 and then took part in the Dunkirk evacuation in June 1940. The regiment later served in the United Kingdom with the 28th Armoured Brigade in the 9th Armoured Division until August 1944, when it moved to North West Europe and saw action at the crossing of the Rhine with the 31st Armoured Brigade in the 79th Armoured Division in March 1945.

==== 2nd Fife and Forfar Yeomanry ====
The 2nd Fife and Forfar Yeomanry took part in the Normandy landings with the 29th Armoured Brigade in the 11th Armoured Division in June 1944. It subsequently saw action in Operation Epsom in June 1944, Operation Goodwood in July 1944, Operation Bluecoat in August 1944 and the Battle of the Bulge in December 1944.

=== Post-war ===
When the Territorial Army was re-formed in May 1947, the regiment resumed its pre-war role as an Armoured Car Regiment. It amalgamated with the Scottish Horse to form the Fife and Forfar Yeomanry/Scottish Horse in 1956. Although the Fife and Forfar Yeomanry/Scottish Horse was disbanded in 1975, the lineage is maintained by "C" Fife and Forfar Yeomanry/Scottish Horse Squadron of The Scottish and North Irish Yeomanry based in Cupar in Fife.

== Memorials ==
A book of remembrance is housed at Cupar Old Parish Church and there is a carved stone plaque dedicated to "To the memory of all ranks – The Fife Light Horse and The Fife and Forfar Yeomanry 1860–1918" inside the ruined church building at Tulliallan Old Churchyard (also known as Woodlea Old Cemetery) at Kincardine on Forth.

== Battle honours ==
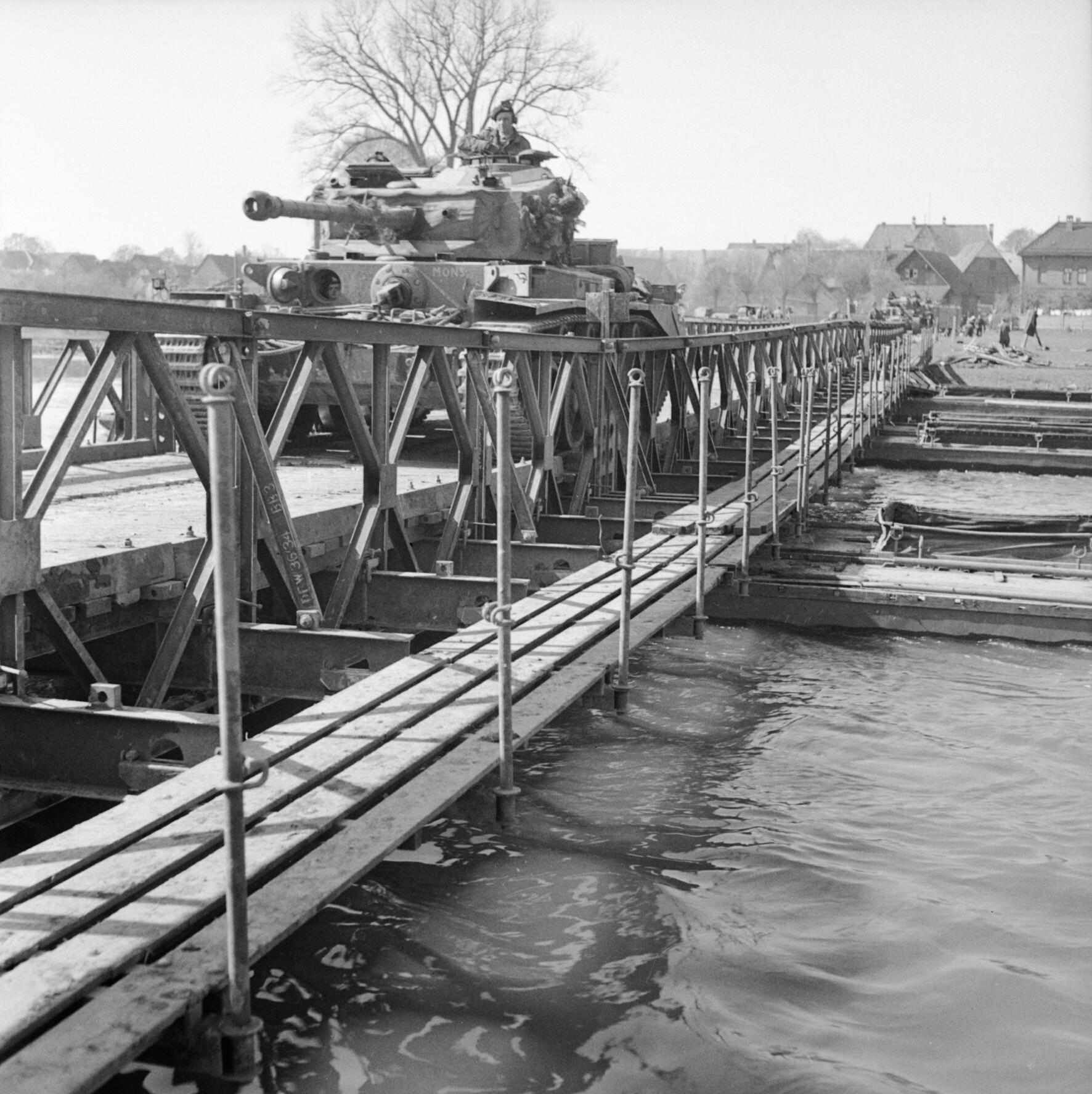
Comet tanks of the 2nd Fife and Forfar Yeomanry crossing the Weser at Petershagen, 7 April 1945

The battle honours of the Fife and Forfar Yeomanry are displayed on the guidon which was laid up at Cupar Old Parish Church when the regiment was amalgamated. After amalgamation, the battle honours were carried on to the guidon of the Fife and Forfar Yeomanry/Scottish Horse and today are represented on the guidon of the Queen's Own Yeomanry. The Fife and Forfar Yeomanry was awarded the following battle honours (honours in bold are emblazoned on the regimental colours):

Second Boer War	**South Africa 1900–01** (Note: Inherited from 1st Fifeshire Light Horse Volunteers and 1st Forfarshire Light Horse Volunteers.)
First World War	**Somme 1918**, **Bapaume 1918**, **Hindenburg Line**, **Épehy**, Pursuit to Mons, **France and Flanders 1918**, **Gallipoli 1915**, **Egypt 1915–17**, **Gaza**, **Jerusalem**, Tell 'Asur, **Palestine 1917–18**
Second World War	**Dunkirk 1940**, **Cheux**, **Bourguébus Ridge**, **Le Perier Ridge**, **Scheldt**, **Ourthe**, **Rhineland**, **Rhine**, **North-West Europe 1940**, **'44–45**

== Guidons ==
The regiment's guidon is laid up in Cupar Old and St Michael of Tarvit Parish Church.

== Honorary Colonels and Commanding Officers ==
	List of Honorary Colonels	List of Commanding Officers/ Officer Commanding
The Fife and Forfar Light Horse (1793–1901)		Col J Anstruther-Thomson (1793–1797); Sir William Erskine (1797–1798); Earl of Crawford (1798–1803); Lt Col Morison of Naughton 1803–1809; Col J Anstruther-Thomson of Charlton(1809–1823); Col W Wemyss of Cuttlehill 1823–1828; General R Balfour of Balbirnie 1831–1837; Colonel Carnegie of Lour (1838–?); Major Randle Jackson 1875–1886; Lt Gen The Earl of Rosslyn (1860–1866); Lt Col Anstruther Thomson(1866–1895); Col Sir John Gilmour 1st Bt (1895–1901)
20th Company of The Imperial Yeomanry (1900–1901)	Col Sir John Gilmour 1st Bt	Capt Chapel Hodge; Capt R Purvis; Capt J Gilmour,
The Fife and Forfar Yeomanry (1901–17)	Col Sir John Gilmour 1st Bt	Lt Col TH Erskine of Grangemuir VD; Lt Col A Mitchell of Luscar (1914–1915)
The FFY during The Great War (1914–19)	Col Sir John Gilmour 1st Bt; Col TH Erskine of Grangemuir VD	Lt Col Sir John Gilmour DSO 2nd Bt; Lt Col J Younger DSO; Lt Col JM MacKenzie; Lt Col DD Ogilvie
20th (FFY) Armoured Car Coy, Royal Tank Corps (1920–39)	Col TH Erskine of Grangemuir VD; Sir John Gilmour, 2nd Baronet (1931)	Lt Col Lindsay 1919; Lt Col RGO Hutchison 1937; Lt Col DE Carnegy-Carnegy of Lour 1937; Lt Col WGC Black 1938
1st FFY, Royal Armoured Corps (Sept 1939 to Jun 1946)	Sir John Gilmour, 2nd Baronet	Lt Col RG "Ponto" Sharp Sept 1939 – May 1940; Lt Col GJ de W Mullens Jun 1940 – Mar 1942; Lt Col EL Fanshawe Mar 1942 – Aug 1943; Lt Col WGN Walker MC Aug 1943 – Jun 1945; Lt Col R de C Vigors DSO Jun 1945 – Jun 1946
2nd FFY, Royal Armoured Corps (Sept 1939 to Jan 1946)	Sir John Gilmour, 2nd Baronet; Col The Viscount Younger DSO TD	Lt Col AH McIntosh OBE TD Sept 1939 – Dec 1940; Lt Col ES Sword Jan 1941 – Oct 1941; Lt Col KC Cooper Oct 1941 – Oct 1942; Lt Col ABJ Scott DSO MC Oct 1942 – Nov 1945; Maj JD Hutchison MC Nov 1945 – Jan 1946
The Fife and Forfar Yeomanry (May 1947 to Nov 1956)	Col The Viscount Younger DSO TD, Col ME Lindsay DSO DL; Col WCG Black OBE MC TD	Lt Col J Murray-Prain DSO OBE TD DL ?-1948 Lt Col Sir John Gilmour, 3rd Bt DSO TD DL 1948–1950; Lt Col JD Hutchison MC 1950–1953; Lt Col BH Thomson TD 1953–55; Lt Col HRS Stewart TD 1956

== Uniform ==
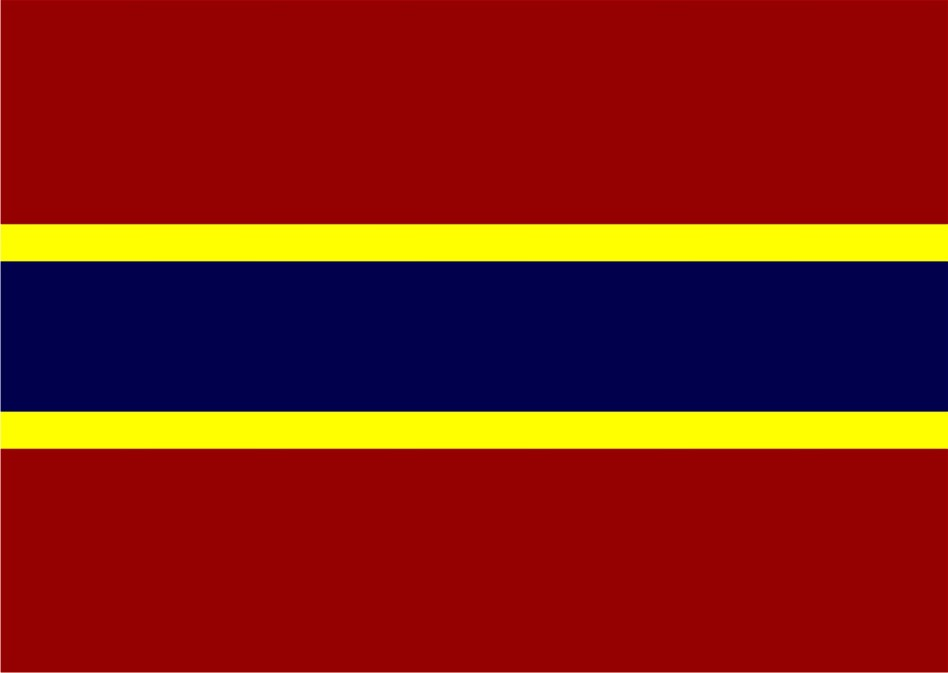
Fife and Forfar Yeomanry Stable Belt

The cap badge of the FFY is a mounted knight (The Thane of Fife). It was also worn on the collars of the officers and men of the Squadron and on the arms above the chevrons of all Senior Non-Commissioned Officers. The black beret of the Royal Tank Regiment was worn as regimental headdress. The regiment wore a stable belt in the regimental colours of crimson and yellow with a dark blue stripe.

== Regimental music ==
The Quick March of the Regiment was "Wee Cooper of Fife".

== Affiliated regiments and formations ==
Affiliated regiments and formations were as follows:

- United Kingdom – 1st The Royal Dragoons

== The Fife and Forfar Yeomanry Locomotive ==
A British Rail Class 55 'Deltic' diesel locomotive D9006 (later 55006), built between 1961 and 1962 by English Electric, was named after the Regiment. It was designed for the high-speed express passenger services on the East Coast Main Line between London King's Cross and Edinburgh.

== See also ==
- Imperial Yeomanry
- List of Yeomanry Regiments 1908
- Yeomanry
- Yeomanry order of precedence
- British yeomanry during the First World War
- Second line yeomanry regiments of the British Army

== Sources ==
- Bellis, Malcolm A. (1994). Regiments of the British Army 1939–1945 (Armour & Infantry). London: Military Press International. ISBN 0-85420-999-9.
- James, Brigadier E.A. (1978). British Regiments 1914–18. London: Samson Books Limited. ISBN 0-906304-03-2.
- Joslen, Lt-Col H.F. (1990) [1st. Pub. HMSO:1960]. Orders of Battle, Second World War, 1939–1945. London: London Stamp Exchange. ISBN 0-948130-03-2.
- Mileham, Patrick (1994). The Yeomanry Regiments; 200 Years of Tradition. Edinburgh: Canongate Academic. ISBN 1-898410-36-4.
- Rinaldi, Richard A (2008). Order of Battle of the British Army 1914. Ravi Rikhye. ISBN 978-0-97760728-0.
