= Sussex Yeomanry =

- Active: 23 June 1794–1828; 28 March 1831–1848; 14 June 1901 – present
- Country: Kingdom of Great Britain (1794–1800); United Kingdom (1801 – present)
- Branch: Territorial Force/Territorial Army
- Type: Yeomanry
- Role: Cavalry; Artillery; Engineers
- Size: Regiment
- Garrison/HQ: Brighton
- Engagements: Second Boer War; First World War; Gallipoli; First Battle of Gaza (26 March 1917); Second Battle of Gaza (19 April 1917); Third Battle of Gaza (31 October – 7 November 1917); Jerusalem; Battle of the Somme 1918; Second World War (Note: No battle honours were awarded. It is tradition within artillery units that the Regiment's guns represent its colours. The Royal Regiment of Artillery has but one battle honour 'Ubique', meaning 'Everywhere'.); East African Campaign; Siege of Tobruk

Commanders
- Notable commanders: George Wyndham, 3rd Earl of Egremont; Charles Wyndham, 3rd Baron Leconfield; Charles Gordon-Lennox, 8th Duke of Richmond

The Sussex Yeomanry is a yeomanry regiment of the British Army dating from 1794. It was initially formed when there was a threat of French invasion during the Napoleonic Wars. After being reformed in the Second Boer War, it served in the First World War and the Second World War, when it served in the East African Campaign and the Siege of Tobruk. The lineage is maintained by 1 (Sussex Yeomanry) Field Troop, 579 Field Squadron (EOD), part of 101 (London) Engineer Regiment (Explosive Ordnance Disposal) (Volunteers).

== French Revolutionary and Napoleonic Wars ==
After Britain was drawn into the French Revolutionary Wars, Prime Minister William Pitt the Younger proposed on 14 March 1794 that the counties should form a force of Volunteer Yeoman Cavalry (Yeomanry) that could be called on by the King to defend the country against invasion or by the Lord Lieutenant to subdue any civil disorder within the county. By the end of the year, 27 counties had raised Yeomanry, including Sussex. A unit of four troops under the designation of Sussex Troops of Gentlemen and Yeomen Cavalry was formed on 23 June 1794, with its headquarters (HQ) at Petworth House, the estate of George Wyndham, 3rd Earl of Egremont, who took command of the force as colonel, as well as commanding the Petworth Troop:

- Petworth Cavalry
- Henfield Cavalry
- West Hoathly Cavalry
- Forest Row Cavalry, with a detachment at Ashdown

Other Troops were soon added:

- Hastings Cavalry, raised 26 July 1794 as an independent troop, regimented by 1802
- Rye Cavalry, raised 31 July 1794 as an independent troop, regimented by 1802
- Midhurst Cavalry, raised 24 November 1794, with a detachment at Cowdray
- Lewes Cavalry, raised 3 June 1795, with a detachment at Coombes
- Parham Cavalry, raised 8 October 1795 by Sir Cecil Bisshopp, 8th Baronet. It usually exercised at his estate at Parham Park, drilling in the gallery of the house when the weather was wet. The troop reached a strength of 80 officers and men.
- Rape of Chichester Cavalry, raised 17 June 1797, with a detachment at Watergate
- Eastbourne Cavalry, raised 20 June 1798, with a detachment at Willingdon
- Ashburnham Cavalry, raised 27 June 1798
- Brightling Cavalry, raised 27 June 1798 with a detachment at Rose Hill

In 1794, the Churchwardens of the Lewes Visitation pledged to raised the 'Sussex Churchwardens' Corps' with blue uniforms, but in the event the troop was never formed.

A Yeomanry artillery troop, the Duke of Richmond's Light Horse Artillery was raised by Field Marshal Charles Lennox, 3rd Duke of Richmond on 15 June 1797 at his estate at Goodwood House. The Duke was a proponent of Horse artillery, and the troop was equipped with his own design of Curricle gun carriage, pulled by four horses (two of which were ridden), with three gunners sitting on the carriage. The troop consisted of two sections and was armed with two 3-pounder guns and two 4.5-inch Coehorn mortars.

The Treaty of Amiens in 1802 saw most of the Yeomanry disbanded, leaving six troops in Sussex (Petworth, West Hoathly, Midhurst, Lewes, Parham and Chichester). The peace was short-lived and Britain declared war on France again in May 1803, beginning the Napoleonic Wars. The Sussex Yeomanry Cavalry was quickly reformed, including the following additional troops:

- Firle Cavalry, raised 28 July 1803
- Ringmer Cavalry, raised 2 September 1803
- Rye Cavalry, reformed 1 October 1803
- Goodwood Artillery Troop, reformed 15 October 1803
- Ashburnham Cavalry, reformed 17 November 1803

By 1806, there was also a cavalry troop forming part of the North Pevensey Legion, but this was raised under the Volunteer Act 1804 and did not form part of the Yeomanry. The Sussex Cavalry (three troops) and Sussex Guides were raised in 1803, but these were probably also Volunteers. For a while, the Yeomanry and infantry volunteers were combined to form the Sussex Legion, but the Volunteers were disbanded at the end of the Napoleonic Wars, and the Yeomanry reverted to their previous title.

== 19th century ==
The Yeomanry declined in importance and strength after the end of the French wars, and by 1817 only three of the original troops (Petworth, Lewes and Midhurst) survived, joined by a new West Coast Troop raised at Yapton on 30 July 1816. However, a new Goodwood Troop of Yeomanry Artillery was raised on 19 October 1817 by Charles Gordon-Lennox, Earl of March and Darnley (later 5th Duke of Richmond). The unit consisted of four detachments, each of one gun with two pairs of horses, two sergeants and eight gunners. At an inspection in Goodwood Park in 1824, the troop marched past with four 3-pounders (possibly the same guns laid up by the earlier troop) and an ammunition wagon. The troop was disbanded in December 1827.

The remaining troops of Sussex Yeomanry were disbanded when government support was withdrawn in 1828. However, a wave of civil unrest across Britain from 1830 led to a revival of the Yeomanry. The Petworth Troop was reformed on 28 March 1831 and the Sussex Yeomanry Cavalry was reformed as a regiment on 18 May that year, with its HQ at Arundel and the following organisation:

- Petworth Troop, disbanded by 1843
- Arundel and Bramber Yeomanry Cavalry (two troops), disbanded 1848

In 1871, the 1st Sussex Light Horse Volunteers were formed at Brighton, but these were part of the post-1859 Volunteer Force and not Yeomanry. They were disbanded in 1875.

== Second Boer War ==
Following a string of defeats during Black Week in early December 1899, the British government realised that it would need more troops than just the regular army to fight the Second Boer War. On 13 December, the decision to allow volunteer forces serve in the field was made, and a Royal Warrant was issued on 24 December. This officially created the Imperial Yeomanry (IY). The force was organised as county service companies of approximately 115 men, and volunteers (usually middle and upper class) quickly filled the new force, which was equipped to operate as Mounted infantry. No 3 Troop, 20th (Fife and Forfarshire Light Horse) Company of 6th (Scottish) Battalion, IY, was soon expanded into 69th (Sussex) Company, Imperial Yeomanry. The first contingent of 20 IY battalions arrived in South Africa between February and April and upon arrival were sent throughout the zone of operations. 69th Company disembarked in South Africa on 24 April 1900, and initially served in 14th Battalion, transferring to 7th Battalion in 1902.

On 14 June 1901, approval was given for a new regiment of Sussex Imperial Yeomanry (all Yeomanry were designated Imperial Yeomanry from 1901 to 1907) to be formed under the command of Lt-Col Charles Wyndham, 3rd Baron Leconfield of Petworth, a former officer in the 1st Life Guards. The returned veterans of 69th (Sussex) Company formed the cadre for the new regiment, which had the following organisation:

- Regimental HQ (RHQ) at 10 Great College Street, Brighton, moving to 26 Silwood Street in 1902 and Church Street in Autumn 1913
- A Squadron at Hove
- B Squadron at Lewes
- C Squadron at Chichester
- D Squadron at Hastings and Rye, later at Eastbourne

Enlistment for the new unit began on 1 October, and by 2 April 1902 69 men had been sent to South Africa to join the various IY companies still serving there. By the time the regiment carried out its first training camp at Lewes, in May 1902, it had a strength of 413.

== Territorial Force ==
The Imperial Yeomanry were subsumed into the new Territorial Force (TF) under the Haldane Reforms of 1908. The Sussex Yeomanry (TF) were organised as follows:

- RHQ at Drill Hall, Church Street, Brighton
- A Squadron at Brighton, with detachments at Horsham, Worthing, Haywards Heath and Crawley
- B Squadron at Lewes, with detachments at Burgess Hill, Eridge, Brighton, Uckfield, Tunbridge Wells and Haywards Heath
- C Squadron at Chichester, with a detachment at Bognor
- D Squadron at Eastbourne, with detachments at St Leonards, Bexhill and Rye

The Sussex Yeomanry formed part of the TF's South Eastern Mounted Brigade.

== First World War ==
=== Mobilisation ===
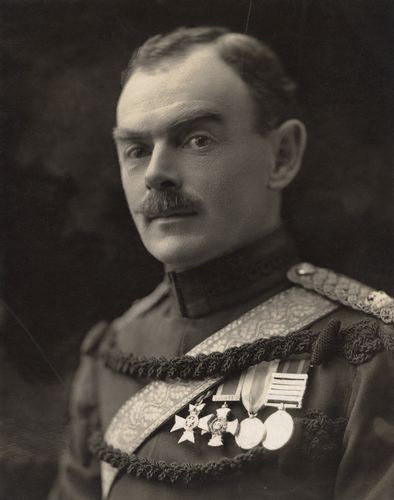
Lt-Col Charles Gordon-Lennox, Earl of March (later 8th Duke of Richmond) in the uniform of the Sussex Yeomanry.

The Sussex Yeomanry were mobilised on the outbreak of war on 4 August 1914 under the Charles Gordon-Lennox, Earl of March, DSO, who had only taken command on 3 July. Under the Territorial and Reserve Forces Act 1907 (7 Edw. 7, c.9), which brought the TF into being, it was intended to be a home defence force for service during wartime and members could not be compelled to serve outside the country. However, after the outbreak of war, TF units were invited to volunteer for 'Imperial Service'. On 15 August 1914, the War Office issued instructions to separate those men who had signed up for Home Service only, and form these into reserve units. On 31 August, the formation of a reserve or 2nd Line unit was authorised for each 1st Line unit where 60 per cent or more of the men had volunteered for Overseas Service. The titles of these 2nd Line units would be the same as the original, but distinguished by a '2/' prefix. In this way, duplicate battalions, brigades and divisions were created, mirroring those TF formations being sent overseas. Later, a 3rd Line was formed to act as a reserve, providing trained replacements for the 1st and 2nd Line regiments.

=== 1/1st Sussex Yeomanry ===
The 1st Line regiment went to its war station at Canterbury (under Second Army of Central Force)) until September 1915. It was dismounted and left Kent for Liverpool; on 24 September, it boarded RMS Olympic and sailed the next day. It arrived at Lemnos on 1 October. The regiment landed in Gallipoli on 8 October and was attached to the 42nd (East Lancashire) Division. Within days of the landing the Regiment reported many men suffering from enteritis. While at Gallipoli they spent time in the trenches at Border Barricade and Fusilier Bluff. On 30 December it was evacuated to Mudros with 42nd Division; it left the Division at Mudros on 2 January 1916.

The brigade, with the regiment, was withdrawn to Egypt in February 1916 and formed part of the Suez Canal Defences. On 22 February, South Eastern Mounted Brigade was absorbed into the 3rd Dismounted Brigade (along with the Eastern Mounted Brigade). The brigade served as part of the Suez Canal Defences from 14 March to 26 July attached to 42nd (East Lancashire) Division; it then joined the Western Frontier Force. By the end of the year, it was back on the Suez.

The brigade was with the Suez Canal Defences when, on 14 January 1917, Egyptian Expeditionary Force (EEF) Order No. 26 instructed that the 2nd, 3rd and 4th Dismounted Brigades be reorganized as the 229th, 230th and 231st Brigades. The brigade units were reorganized in January and February 1917. As a result, the 1/1st Sussex Yeomanry was converted to infantry at Mersa Matruh on 3 January 1917 and redesignated 16th (Sussex Yeomanry) Battalion, Royal Sussex Regiment.

On 23 February, the GOC EEF (Lt-Gen Sir A.J. Murray) sought permission from the War Office to form the 229th, 230th and 231st Brigades into a new division. The War Office granted permission and the new 74th (Yeomanry) Division started to form. The 230th Brigade joined the division at Deir el Balah between 9 and 13 April. The battalion remained with 230th Brigade in 74th (Yeomanry) Division for the rest of the war.

With the 74th Division, the battalion took part in the invasion of Palestine in 1917 and 1918. It fought in the Second and Third Battles of Gaza (including the capture of Beersheba and the Sheria Position). At the end of 1917, it took part in the capture and defence of Jerusalem and in March 1918 in the Battle of Tell 'Asur. On 3 April 1918, the Division was warned that it would move to France and by 30 April 1918 had completed embarkation at Alexandria.

In May 1918, the battalion landed at Marseille, France, with 74th (Yeomanry) Division. It served in France and Flanders with the division for the rest of the war. By 18 May, the division had concentrated around Rue in the Abbeville area. Here the dismounted Yeomanry underwent training for service on the Western Front, particularly gas defence.

On 14 July 1918, the Yeomanry Division went into the line for the first time, near Merville on the right of XI Corps. From September 1918, as part of III Corps of Fourth Army, it took part in the Hundred Days Offensive including the Second Battle of the Somme (Second Battle of Bapaume) and the Battles of the Hindenburg Line (Battle of Épehy). In October and November 1918, it took part in the Final Advance in Artois and Flanders. By the Armistice, it was near Tournai, Belgium, still with 74th (Yeomanry) Division.

With the end of the war, the troops of 74th Division were engaged in railway repair work and education was undertaken while demobilisation began. The division and its subformations were disbanded on 10 July 1919 and the Yeomanry disembodied.

=== 2/1st Sussex Yeomanry ===
The 2nd Line regiment was formed at Brighton in September 1914 and remained there until May 1915. It then moved to Maresfield and joined 2/1st South Eastern Mounted Brigade; there it took over the horses of 2nd King Edward's Horse who were going dismounted to the Western Front. In October 1915, the regiment was at Canterbury. On 31 March 1916, the remaining Mounted Brigades were ordered to be numbered in a single sequence; the brigade was numbered as 14th Mounted Brigade and joined 4th Mounted Division.

In July 1916, 4th Mounted Division became 2nd Cyclist Division and the regiment was converted to a cyclist unit in 5th Cyclist Brigade at Great Bentley. In September the regiment sent a large draft of reinforcements under Maj Roland Gwynne to 10th (Service) Battalion, Queen's (Royal West Surrey Regiment) (Battersea) in France, and Gwynne eventually became commanding officer of 10th Queen's. In November 1916, the division was broken up and the regiment was merged with the 2/1st Surrey Yeomanry to form 8th (Surrey and Sussex) Yeomanry Cyclist Regiment in 3rd Cyclist Brigade at Ipswich. In March 1917, it resumed its identity as 2/1st Sussex Yeomanry at Ipswich, and later moved to the Woodbridge area. In April 1918, the regiment moved with 3rd Cyclist Brigade to Ireland, landing in Dublin on 21 April. Initially, it was stationed at Clandeboye and in September 1918 to Boyle; there was no further change before the end of the war. 2/1st Sussex Yeomanry were disbanded at the Curragh on 3 February 1920.

=== 3/1st Sussex Yeomanry ===
The 3rd Line regiment was formed in July 1915 at Brighton and affiliated to the 3rd Reserve Cavalry Regiment at Canterbury. In the summer of 1916, it was dismounted and attached to the 3rd Line Groups of the Home Counties Division at Crowborough as its 1st Line was serving as infantry. The regiment was disbanded in January 1917 with personnel transferring to the 2nd Line regiment or to the 4th (Reserve) Battalion of the Royal Sussex Regiment at Tunbridge Wells.

== Between the wars ==
After the First World War, the TF was reformed as the Territorial Army (TA). The 14 senior Yeomanry regiments remained horsed cavalry regiments (6 forming the 5th and 6th Cavalry Brigades) while the remaining Yeomanry Regiments were reassigned as artillery. On 7 February 1920 the regiment reformed as the 13th (Sussex Yeomanry) Army Brigade, Royal Field Artillery (RFA), but in 1921 this was redesignated 98th (Sussex Yeomanry) Brigade, RFA. Then in 1922 it amalgamated with two batteries newly converted from the Surrey Yeomanry to form 98th (Surrey and Sussex Yeomanry) Brigade, Royal Field Artillery with 389 and 390 (Sussex Yeomanry) Field Batteries, and 391 and 392 (Surrey Yeomanry) Field Batteries. In 1924 it was redesignated 98th (Surrey and Sussex Yeomanry, Queen Mary's) Army Field Brigade, Royal Artillery, and the Regimental Headquarters moved from Brighton to Clapham Park. The regiment was among the 'Army Troops' administered by 44th (Home Counties) Infantry Divisional Area. When the TA was doubled in size following the Munich Crisis, 389 and 390 (Sussex Yeomanry) Batteries left to form a duplicate regiment, 144th Field Regiment, RA at Brighton in 1939. Both regiments were considered to be 'Surrey & Sussex Yeomanry', and 144th received the 'Surrey and Sussex Yeomanry, Queen Mary's' subtitle in 1942. (Note: Although one source suggests that each regiment had one Surrey and one Sussex battery, the last detailed Monthly Army List published before the war (May 1939) confirms that 389 and 390 Btys (144th Fd Rgt) were titled 'Sussex Yeomanry' and 391 and 392 (98th Fd Rgt) were 'Surrey Yeomanry'.)

== Second World War ==
=== 98th Field Regiment (Surrey & Sussex Yeomanry Queen Mary's) ===
See main article 98th Field Regiment (Surrey & Sussex Yeomanry Queen Mary's)

On mobilisation in 1939, the Regiment was part of the British Expeditionary Force (B.E.F.) that was sent to France, initially attached to the 1st Infantry Division in the Lille area. In May 1940, it would be attached in turn to the 46th and 44th Infantry Divisions during the German advance the regiments Guns and vehicles were caught in a traffic jam and had to be destroyed, with the troops proceeding on foot to Dunkirk for evacuation. Back in the United Kingdom the regiment was attached to the 1st Infantry Brigade while it reformed it remained in the United Kingdom until September 1942 when it was sent out to the Middle East and attached to the 10th Armoured Division in Egypt where it participated in the Second Battle of El Alamein, when 10th Armoured was disbanded the regiment was part of the 8th Army Artillery and served in Sicily and Italy being involved in the Battle of Monte Cassino amongst others before leaving Italy in March 1945 and joining the 2nd Army in France and Belgium ending the war in the Netherlands. In April 1945 the Regiment moved to the Lübeck area of Germany as occupation forces and demobilisation was started in October 1945 with the Regiment being placed in suspended animation on 8 May 1946.

=== 144th Field Regiment (Surrey & Sussex Yeomanry Queen Mary's) ===
==== Home Defence ====
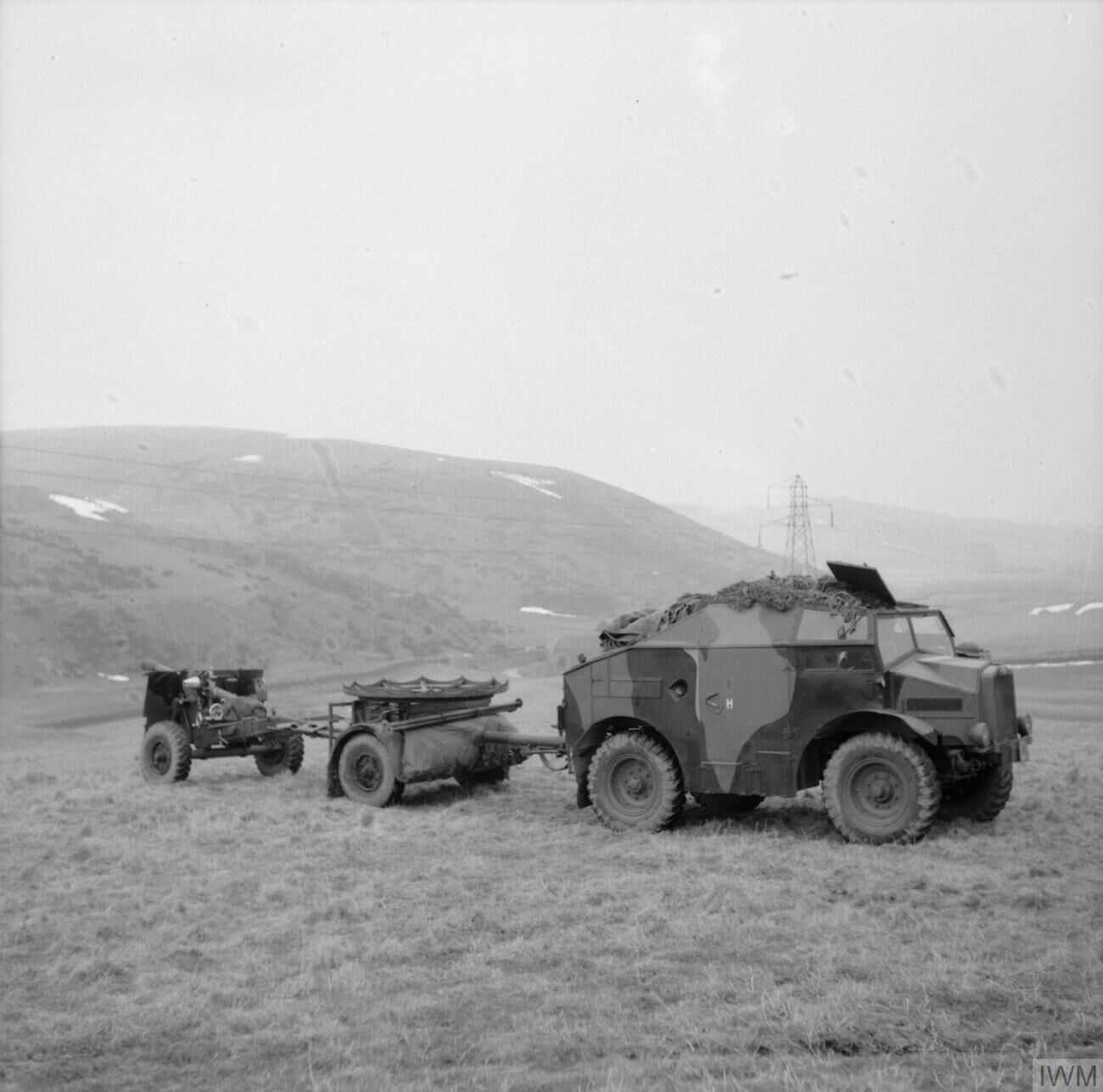
25-pounder and Quad tractor on exercise in the United Kingdom

On the outbreak of war in September 1939, the regiment mobilised at Brighton as an Army field regiment in Eastern Command. It was equipped with 12 × 4.5-inch howitzers of First World War vintage, but within days it had handed over eight of these guns to 123 Officer Cadet Training Unit at Catterick Garrison and all its vehicles to 98th (S&SY) Fd Rgt, which was preparing to go to France with the British Expeditionary Force (BEF). In the following weeks, the regiment received 18 × 18-pounder Mk II guns, and 15 assorted civilian vehicles. In December 1939 the regiment supplied a cadre of trained officers and men to provide the basis of a new 74th Medium Regiment that was forming at Preston Park, Brighton (see below). In April 1940, 144th Fd Rgt went to Dursley in Gloucestershire to join IV Corps, and began to receive modern 25-pounder guns and Quad tractors. By June, when the BEF had been evacuated from Dunkirk without any of its guns, 144th Fd Rgt was one of the few field regiments in the UK with its full allotment of 24 × 25-pounders. It was attached to the Regular Army 4th Division, which was refitting in Hampshire, before returning to IV Corps in August.

==== East Africa ====
The 1941 campaign in Eritrea.

After Italy declared war in the summer of 1940, the War Office sent reinforcements to protect the British bases in Egypt, the convoys taking the longer but safer round the Cape of Good Hope to the Red Sea ports. These reinforcements included three field regiments sent before the end of 1940, including 144th (S&SY). On 16 November, the regiment under Lt-Col H.T.W. Clements landed at Suez, and by 8 December it been taken back to Port Sudan to join 5th Indian Division at Haiya in the Sudan.

On arrival, 390 Bty (less F Troop) under the command of Major E.C.R. Mansergh, was sent to Mekali Wells to join 'Gazelle Force' on 11 December. Organised around the divisional motor cavalry regiment (Skinner's Horse) and two motor machine gun companies of the Sudan Defence Force, Gazelle Force under the command of Colonel Frank Messervy had been raiding Italian frontier posts since October, and 390 Bty's 25-pounders replaced an earlier battery of 18-pounders. F Troop, which had been detached to Gebeit, rejoined 390 Bty on 17 January.

In January 1941, the British force advanced against Kassala and the Italians withdrew. Gazelle Force was sent in pursuit. On 21 January, it was approaching Keru when D and F Troops of 390 Bty were charged by about 60 Eritrean cavalry led by two Italian officers on grey horses – probably the last time British forces faced a cavalry charge. The horsemen were driven off by the guns firing over open sights and gunners of 25th Fd Rgt using rifles. The battery's observation posts (OPs) also drove off enemy infantry and dismounted cavalry who were working round the position. After the enemy had been winkled out of Keru Gorge, a three-day fight for Agordat followed, with the guns supporting infantry fighting their way up steep hills. By 1 February, the advance was continuing at high speed, the guns driving at 35 mph until they were stopped by artillery fire 1 mile (1.6 km) short of Ponte Mussolini on the Barka River. E Troop unlimbered and put the Italian guns out of action with seven rounds. On 3 February, the battery reached the main Italian defensive position at Dongolass Gorge that shut off the Keren Plateau and began shelling the defences.

Sketch map of the Keren battlefield

Reinforced, Gazelle Force attempted to seize the gorge by scaling the heights either side of it. A company of 2nd Battalion, Queen's Own Cameron Highlanders, accompanied by a Forward Observation Officer's (FOO) party from 390 Bty, scaled Point 1616 (later known as Cameron Ridge), pushing off defenders of the Savoia Grenadiers. The eight-week Battle of Keren followed. The steep mountainsides caused problems for the OPs and the guns. 'Brig's Peak' and 'Acqua Col' were unsuccessfully attacked. On 10 February, the 4/6th Rapjputana Rifles (the 'Rajrifs') made another assault on the Acqua Col, Major Mansergh and his party going up with the battalion HQ. Despite the battery firing 2816 rounds in the day, the opposition proved too strong for the Rajrifs.

Meanwhile, the rest of the regiment with 5th Indian Division had been fighting hard for Barentu, until the defenders withdrew after the fall of Agordat. Now the force was concentrated to take Keren and regiment was reunited. The regiment came into action in the Hagas Valley at 20.30 on 14 February. All the artillery of two divisions was concentrated against Mount Sanchil on 16 March, and the OP on Cameron Ridge was able to bring down F Trp's fire on enemy reinforcements massing for a counter-attack. That night the OP reported the British and Indian troops were only yards for their objectives. F Troop tried to silence the enemy mortars and 390 Bty continued firing against divisional targets all next day. On 18 March the OP reported that the enemy had recaptured Sanchil, and at 05.15 the next morning the Alpini battalion of the Savoia Grenadiers was seen running down the gorge, until an effective Defensive Fire (DF) task was called down on them.

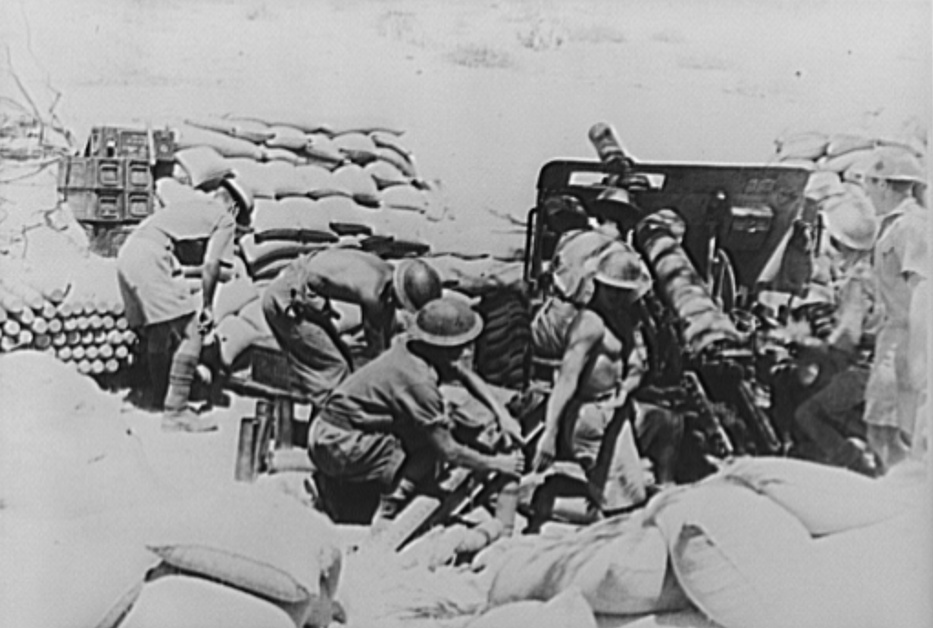
Artillery of an Indian division in action at Keren

Meanwhile, 389 Bty under Major A.G. Munn was supporting Brigadier Messervy's attack on Fort Dolgorodoc. Munn accompanied 2nd Bn Highland Light Infantry and was wounded, while his signaller won a Military Medal for laying out a telephone line under fire when the radio failed. 144th Field Rgt was in constant action beating off enemy counter-attacks, but was sustaining casualties from return fire. On 25 March 398 Bty engaged and dispersed a force of enemy tanks, but that day a mobile column broke through the roadblock in the Dongolass gorge and Keren fell two days later. Afterwards, 144th Fd Rgt was concentrated with 5th Indian Division in the final push on Addis Ababa. At Amba Alagi on 4 May, 29th Indian Infantry Brigade took a series of hill features while covered by a timed artillery fireplan. The following day, Major Munn accompanied 1st Bn Worcestershire Regiment as they took Middle Hill supported by a powerful artillery attack. Further advance on this line was impossible, but the main Italian force in East Africa surrendered on 19 May.

==== Tobruk ====
At the end of the campaign, 5th Indian Division returned to Egypt. 144th Field Rgt sailed from for Suez on 24 June, arriving two days later. In August, it was preparing defensive positions at El Alamein. Then, in September, it came under the direct command of British Troops in Egypt, handed in all its guns and equipment at Alexandria, and the personnel were shipped into the besieged port of Tobruk aboard HMAS Nizam and HMAS Napier on 18/19 September in one of the regular night supply runs by the Royal Navy's Inshore Squadron. At Tobruk, it was attached to 70th Division, replacing the 9th Australian Division which had garrisoned the place during the first part of the siege.

On arrival, the regiment took over an assortment of old guns from 2/12th Australian Fd Rgt, which had been the garrison's primary counter-battery unit:

- 389 Bty
  - A Trp: 4 × 100mm Italian guns (pre-1914)
  - B & C Trps: 4.5-inch howitzers (1904 vintage)
- 390 Bty
  - D Trp: 18-pounders in the anti-tank (A/T) role
  - E Trp: 105mm Italian guns (1914)
  - F Trp: 4 × 60-pounders (First World War)

The CO, Lt-Col Clements, described these as 'what must have been the most extraordinary collection of junk with which any British regiment went into battle'. In October there was a rearrangement, with E Trp taking over 4.5-inch, D Trp 100mm, B & C Trps 18-pdrs, and RHQ manning Austrian-made 150mm howitzers.

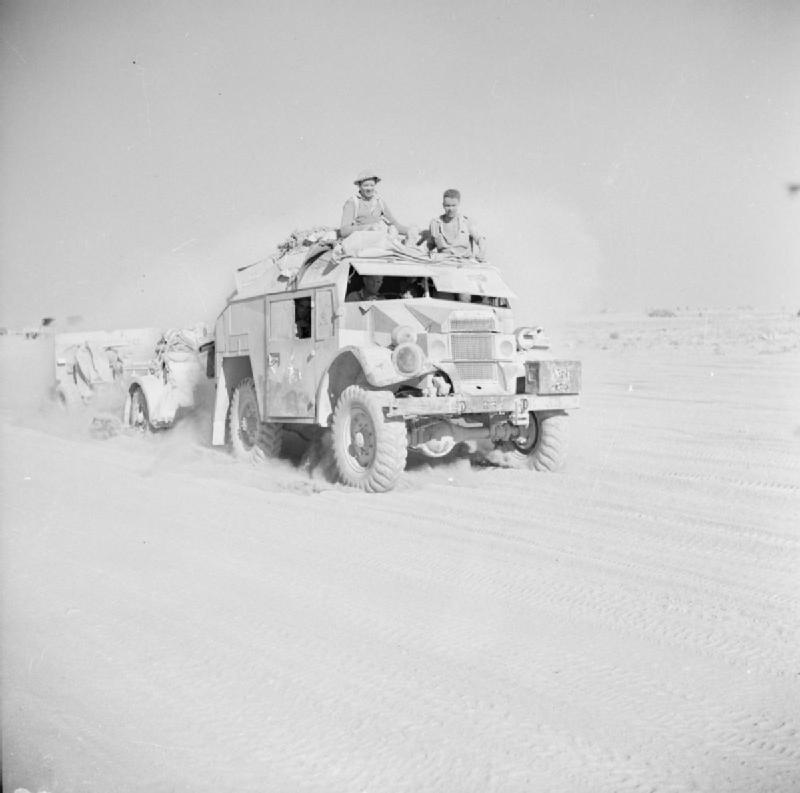
25-pounder and Quad tractor moving up to the front in the Western Desert

On 21 November, 70th Division began its breakout from Tobruk to link up with Eighth Army's Operation Crusader. 144th Field Rgt's FOOs were able to watch the capture of key enemy positions such as 'Tiger', and to direct the 18-pounders of B and C Trps against enemy A/T guns. After hard fighting, covered by 144th Fd Rgt, 70th Division broke through and XIII Corps' HQ entered the town on 29 November. Fighting continued: on 30 November, the regiment halted an enemy infantry counter-attack with a DF programme, though one gun of D Trp was knocked out by a direct hit. The full link-up between Eighth Army and the Tobruk garrison was achieved on 5 December, and by 10 December all enemy troops had withdrawn from the perimeter.

On 28 January 1942, the regiment came under the command of 4th Indian Division and was re-issued with 25-pdrs. 4th Indian had just retired to the Gazala Line, where Eighth Army dug in during a lull in the fighting. On 23 February, the regiment came under 1st Armoured Division. The Gazala Line was screened by small mobile columns: 390 Bty formed part of one mobile column until April, and 389 Bty joined 'Mooncol' in April. On 27 April, the regiment reverted to 5th Indian Division at Sollum.

==== Middle East ====
144th (S&SY) Field Rgt left 5th Indian Division for the last time on 10 May 1942 and was sent to Habbaniyah in Iraq to join Tenth Army. Here, it was joined for a month by 103 Bty from 79th A/T Rgt, in an experimental organisation used in the region. On 4 July, the regiment was sent to Aleppo in Syria to join 17th Indian Infantry Brigade, and then on 24 August to Persia to join 31st Indian Armoured Division. It moved with the division into Iraq on 20 November.

Royal Artillery field regiments had adopted a three-battery organisation earlier in the war, and 144th Fd Rgt finally reorganised its 24 guns into three batteries (389, 390 and 552) in January 1943. In October 1943, 31st Indian Armoured Division moved to Egypt, apparently to join the Italian Campaign, but this never happened. The regiment served for a while as depot regiment at the Middle East School of Artillery at Almaza. It moved to Palestine with 31st Indian Armd Division on 24 February 1944, and received M4 Sherman tanks as OPs. In May 1944, it was the depot regiment at the Mountain Warfare Training Centre at Bsarma in Lebanon. It remained garrisoning Palestine, Lebanon and Syria for the rest of the war – latterly only 390 Bty having guns, the remainder as infantry – and saw no further action.

144th (Surrey & Sussex Yeomanry QMR) Field Regiment was placed in suspended animation at Almaza, Egypt, on 21 September 1945.

=== 74th Medium Regiment ===
The cadre that provided the basis for 74th Medium Regiment was supplied by 144th (S&SY) Fd Rgt, but it was considered a war-formed unit, not part of the TA, and was not granted the Yeomanry subtitle. The cadre was formed on 5 December 1939 and the new regiment came into existence at Preston Park, Brighton, on 2 January 1940. Its two batteries were initially lettered A and B, changing to P and Q on 11 March 1942 At this stage of the war each battery of a medium regiment would consist of eight guns, either 6-inch howitzers or 60-pounders of First World War vintage.

The regiment was formed too late for the Battle of France, but by the end of 1940 it was serving in XII Corps of Home Forces, stationed in the critical invasion area of South-East England. By March 1941 it had its own signal section of the Royal Corps of Signals and was affiliated to 43rd (Wessex) Division defending East Kent. This continued into 1942, the regiment gaining its own transport platoon of the Royal Army Service Corps and Light Aid Detachment of the Royal Electrical and Mechanical Engineers, ready for mobile warfare. In October 1942 the regiment was assigned to First Army preparing for the landings in North Africa (Operation Torch). On 1 January 1943 the two batteries were numbered as 99 and 110 Medium Btys.

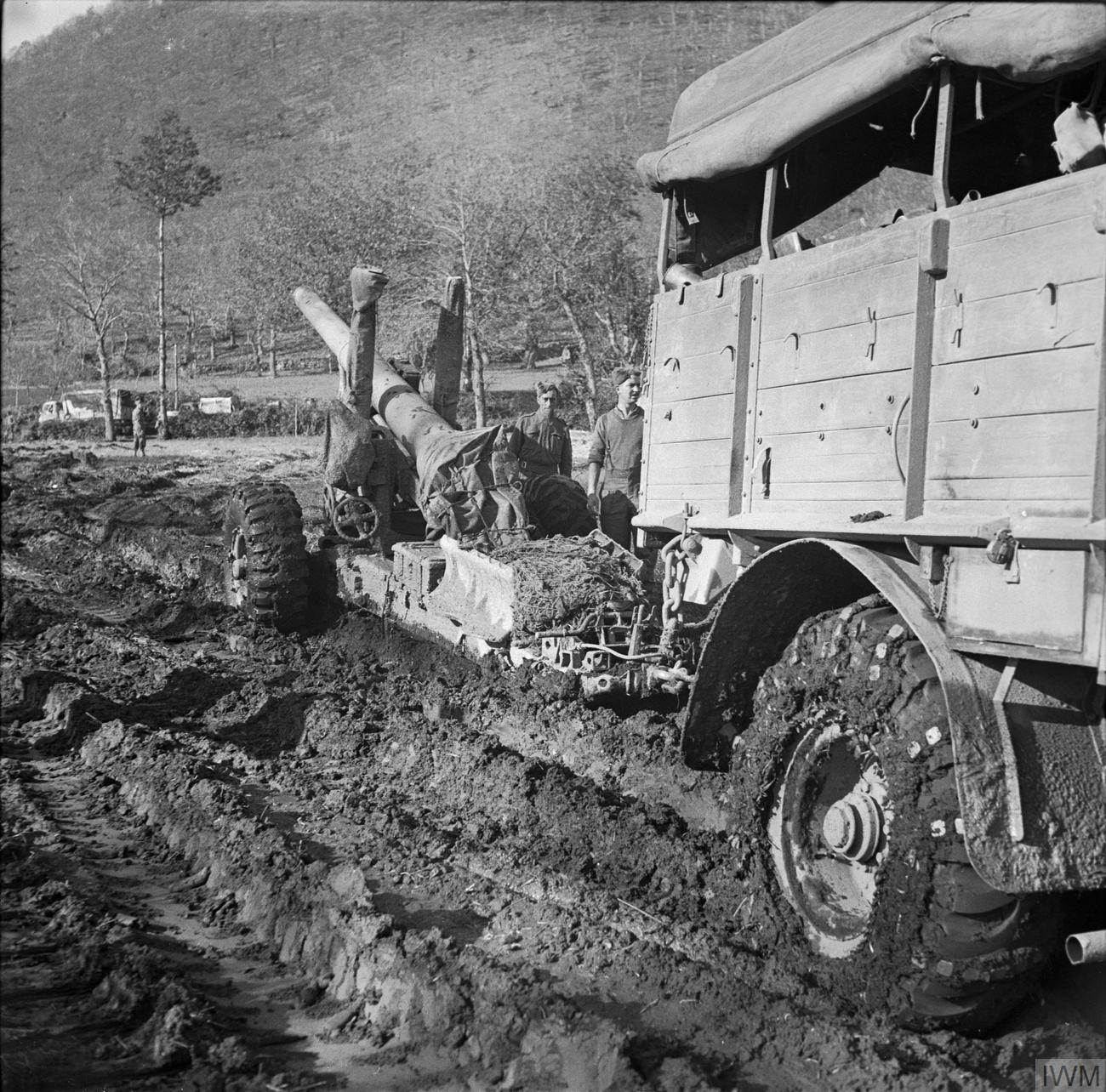
99 Battery of 74th Medium Regiment struggles to bring a 5.5-inch gun into action during the winter fighting at Monte Camino.

74th Medium Regiment served in North Africa with First Army as part of the new style Army Groups Royal Artillery (AGRAs), developed by the gunnery tacticians as powerful artillery brigades, usually comprising three medium regiments and one heavy regiment, which could be rapidly moved about the battlefield, and had the punch to destroy enemy artillery. The first AGRA HQs had been formed in August 1942 and officially sanctioned in November in time for Torch.

74th Heavy Regiment served in 2nd AGRA during the Italian Campaign. For example, it fired in support of 201st Guards Brigade attack on 'Bare Arse Ridge' on 6 November during the Battle of Monte Camino, and in support of 56th (London) Division during the assault crossing of the Garigliano in January 1944.

In February 1944, 2nd AGRA was sent to support the New Zealand Corps. By late May, 2nd AGRA, with 74th Medium Rgt under command, was supporting X Corps' advance after Operation Diadem had broken through the German Winter Line, and the subsequent pursuit to Lake Trasimeno and advance to Florence. It continued with X Corps during Operation Olive to breach the Gothic Line. 2nd AGRA was part of a large concentration of artillery supporting Eighth Army in the Spring 1945 offensive in Italy (Operation Grapeshot).

The regiment was disbanded on 1 December 1945.

== Postwar ==
When the TA was reconstituted in 1947, the two regiments were reformed as 298th (Surrey Yeomanry, Queen Mary's) Field Regiment, RA and 344th (Sussex Yeomanry) Light Anti-Aircraft Regiment, RA. In 1950, the 344th absorbed 605th (Sussex) Heavy Anti-Aircraft Regiment, RA. On 10 March 1955, Anti-Aircraft Command was disbanded and there was a reduction in the number of TA anti-aircraft units. On that day, 344 (Sussex Yeomanry) LAA Rgt merged with 258 (Sussex) LAA Rgt, 313 (Sussex), and 641 (Sussex) Heavy Anti-Aircraft Regiments to form 258 (Sussex Yeomanry) Light Anti-Aircraft Regiment, RA. The former 344 LAA Rgt provided RHQ and P Battery at Brighton to the new regiment. In 1961, this regiment in turn merged with 257 (County of Sussex) Field Rgt to form 257 (Sussex Yeomanry) Field Rgt, with RHQ at Brighton.

When the TA was converted into the TAVR in 1967, the regiment was reduced to 200th (Sussex Yeomanry) Medium Battery in 100th (Eastern) Medium Regiment.

In April 1993, 200 (Sussex Yeomanry) Battery converted to become 127 (Sussex Yeomanry) Field Squadron, 78 (Fortress) Engineer Regiment Royal Engineers. Although the regiment was disbanded in 1999, the lineage is maintained by 2 (Sussex Yeomanry) Troop, 579 Field Squadron (EOD), part of 101 (City of London) Engineer Regiment (Explosive Ordnance Disposal) (Volunteers) at Reigate Army Reserve Centre.

== Uniforms and insignia ==
The several units that made up the Sussex Troops of Gentlemen and Yeomanry in 1794, favoured light cavalry helmets with feather plumes, short dark green jackets with black facings and white breeches. The Arundel and Bramber Troop raised in 1831 followed contemporary Light Dragoon fashion with bell-topped shakos, light blue jackets with red facings and plastron, plus white breeches.

The newly formed Regiment of Sussex Imperial Yeomanry of 1901 wore khaki for both full and service dress, but in both orders with "Dublin Fusiliers Blue" (a bright shade) for cuffs, collars and trouser stripes. Blue Lancer style plastrons were worn for parade and off duty wear. The headdress for all ranks was a Boer War influenced slouch hat of light drab with bright blue emu feather plumes. In 1909 the khaki full dress was replaced by a bright blue "Indian Army pattern" tunic with black braiding for officers and a plainer blue uniform for other ranks resembling the modern No. 1 Dress of the British Army. Peaked "forage caps" with yellow bands were the normal headdress, although officers had a special dragoon style spiked helmet with yellow and blue plumes, for Levee wear and other special ceremonial occasions. The plain khaki service uniform of the regular cavalry was adopted in 1909 for ordinary duties.

Between 1922 and 1930, 98th Field Brigade is believed to have worn an embroidered arm badge with '98' over 'Bde' in a circle in red. on a dark blue background. The RA cap badge was at first worn by all batteries of 98th Field Bde, but after 1930 the batteries wore their Surrey or Sussex Yeomanry cap and collar badges as appropriate. This continued during the Second World War, with both regiments also wearing an embroidered shoulder title with 'SURREY & SUSSEX' over 'YEOMANRY Q.M.R.' in yellow on navy blue. In the Middle East, they wore brass shoulder titles on khaki drill jackets, with 'S&Sx.Yeo' for 98th Field Rgt and 'SSY' for 144th Field Rgt. After the war, both regiments retained their respective Surrey or Sussex Yeomanry cap badges and yellow on navy shoulder titles, 'SURREY YEOMANRY Q.M.R.' for 298th Field Rgt and 'SUSSEX YEOMANRY' for 344th LAA/SL Rgt.

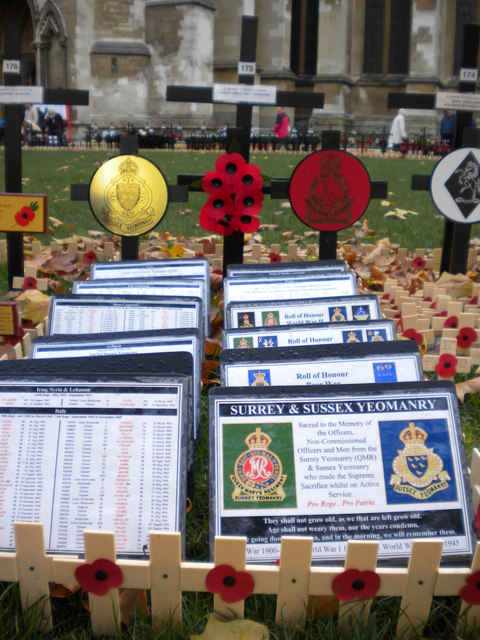
Surrey & Sussex Yeomanry remembered at the Field of Remembrance, Westminster Abbey, November 2009

== Honorary Colonels ==
The following served as Honorary Colonel of the unit:

- William Nevill, 1st Marquess of Abergavenny 28 September 1901
- St John Brodrick, 1st Earl of Midleton, appointed (to Surrey Yeomanry) 28 September 1901 (joint Hon Col from 1922)
- Charles Wyndham, 3rd Baron Leconfield, appointed (to joint regiment) 13 December 1922

== Memorials ==
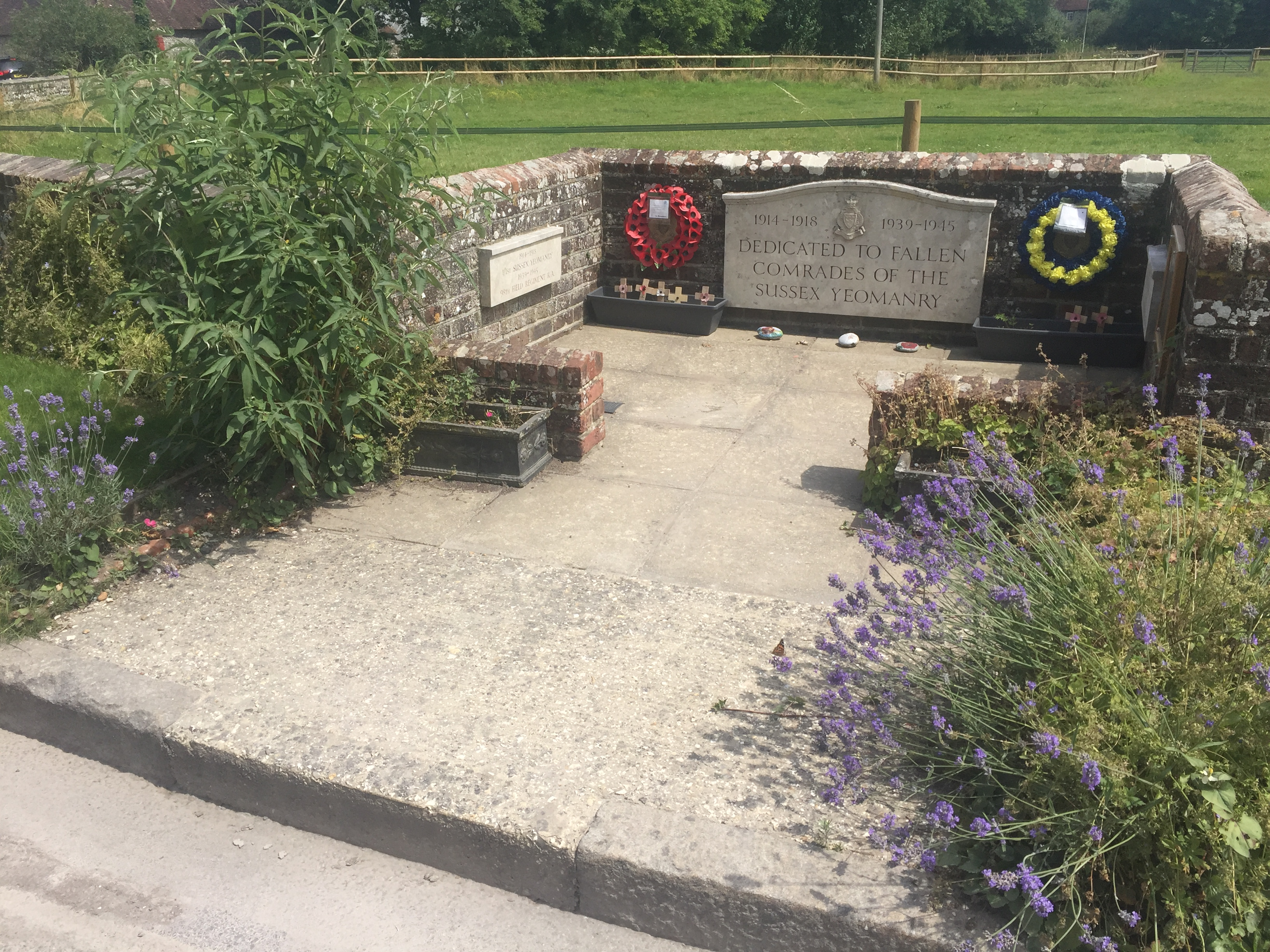
The Sussex Yeomanry memorial at Charlton

A brass plaque commemorating eight members of 69th (Sussex) Company IY who died during the Second Boer War is on the west wall of St Mary the Virgin Church at Battle.

Memorial tablets to the regiment's dead in the First and Second World Wars are set into a wall in the village of Charlton, near Chichester.

== Museum ==
There is a small collection of items associated with the Surrey and Sussex Yeomanry hosted at Newhaven Fort.

== See also ==
- List of Yeomanry Regiments 1908
- Yeomanry order of precedence
- British yeomanry during the First World War
- Second line yeomanry regiments of the British Army
- List of British Army Yeomanry Regiments converted to Royal Artillery

== Bibliography ==
- L.S. Amery (ed), The Times History of the War in South Africa 1899-1902, London: Sampson Low, Marston, 7 Vols 1900–09.
- Maj A. McK, Annand, 'Sir Cecil Bysshopp, Bart. (later 12th Baron Zouche) and the Parham Troop of Sussex Yeomanry, c. 1798', Journal of the Society for Army Historical Research, Vol 45, No 181 (Spring 1967), pp. 17–23.
- Maj A. McK, Annand, 'George O'Brien, 3rd Earl of Egremont, as Colonel of the Sussex Yeomanry, 1798', Journal of the Society for Army Historical Research, Vol 46, No 185 (Spring 1968), pp. 31–32.
- L. Barlow & R.J. Smith, The Uniforms of the British Yeomanry Force 1794–1914, 1: The Sussex Yeomanry Cavalry, London: Robert Ogilby Trust/Tunbridge Wells: Midas Books, ca 1979, ISBN 0-85936-183-7.
- Becke, Archibald F. (1936). Order of Battle of Divisions Part 2A. The Territorial Force Mounted Divisions and the 1st-Line Territorial Force Divisions (42–56). London: HMSO. OCLC 4405016.
- Maj A.F. Becke,History of the Great War: Order of Battle of Divisions, Part 2b: The 2nd-Line Territorial Force Divisions (57th–69th), with the Home-Service Divisions (71st–73rd) and 74th and 75th Divisions, London: HM Stationery Office, 1937/Uckfield: Naval & Military Press, 2007, ISBN 1-847347-39-8.
- Ian F.W. Beckett, Riflemen Form: A Study of the Rifle Volunteer Movement 1859–1908, Aldershot: Ogilby Trusts, 1982, ISBN 0 85936 271 X.
- Burke's Peerage, Baronetage and Knightage, 100th Edn, London, 1953.
- Basil Collier, History of the Second World War, United Kingdom Military Series: The Defence of the United Kingdom Archived 28 January 2015 at the Wayback Machine, London: HM Stationery Office, 1957/Uckfield: Naval & Military, 2004, ISBN 978-1-84574-055-9.
- Davis, Lt-Col T B (1980). The Surrey and Sussex Yeomanry in the Second World War (1st ed.). Ditchling: Ditchling Press. ISBN 0-9500584-3-2.
- Col John K. Dunlop, The Development of the British Army 1899–1914, London: Methuen, 1938.
- Maj L.F. Ellis, History of the Second World War, United Kingdom Military Series: The War in France and Flanders 1939–1940, London: HM Stationery Office, 1954/Uckfield: Naval & Military, 2004, 978-1-85457-056-6. Archived 5 December 2014 at the Wayback Machine
- Gen Sir Martin Farndale, History of the Royal Regiment of Artillery: The Years of Defeat: Europe and North Africa, 1939–1941, Woolwich: Royal Artillery Institution, 1988/London: Brasseys, 1996, ISBN 1-85753-080-2.
- J.B.M. Frederick, Lineage Book of British Land Forces 1660–1978, Vol I, Wakefield: Microform Academic, 1984, ISBN 1-85117-007-3.
- J.B.M. Frederick, Lineage Book of British Land Forces 1660–1978, Vol II, Wakefield: Microform Academic, 1984, ISBN 1-85117-009-X.
- Michael Glover, An Improvised War: The Abyssinian Campaign of 1940–1941, London: Leo Cooper, 1987, ISBN 0-85052-241-2.
- Gen Sir William Jackson, History of the Second World War, United Kingdom Military Series: The Mediterranean and Middle East, Vol VI: Victory in the Mediterranean, Part I|: June to October 1944, London: HM Stationery Office, 1987/Uckfield, Naval & Military Press, 2004, ISBN 1-845740-71-8.
- Gen Sir William Jackson, History of the Second World War, United Kingdom Military Series: The Mediterranean and Middle East, Vol VI: Victory in the Mediterranean, Part I|I: November 1944 to May 1945, London: HM Stationery Office, 1988/Uckfield, Naval & Military Press, 2004, ISBN 1-845740-72-6.
- Brig E.A. James, British Regiments 1914–18, London: Samson Books, 1978, ISBN 0-906304-03-2/Uckfield: Naval & Military Press, 2001, ISBN 978-1-84342-197-9.
- Lt-Col H.F. Joslen, Orders of Battle, United Kingdom and Colonial Formations and Units in the Second World War, 1939–1945, London: HM Stationery Office, 1960/London: London Stamp Exchange, 1990, ISBN 0-948130-03-2/ Uckfield: Naval & Military Press, 2003, ISBN 1-843424-74-6.
- Norman E.H. Litchfield, The Territorial Artillery 1908–1988 (Their Lineage, Uniforms and Badges), Nottingham: Sherwood Press, 1992, ISBN 0-9508205-2-0.
- Mileham, Patrick (1994). The Yeomanry Regiments; 200 Years of Tradition. Edinburgh: Canongate Academic. ISBN 1-898410-36-4.
- Brig C.J.C. Molony,History of the Second World War, United Kingdom Military Series: The Mediterranean and Middle East, Vol V: The Campaign in Sicily 1943 and the Campaign in Italy 3rd September 1943 to 31st March 1944, London: HM Stationery Office, 1973/Uckfield, Naval & Military Press, 2004, ISBN 1-845740-69-6.
- Brig C.J.C. Molony, History of the Second World War, United Kingdom Military Series: The Mediterranean and Middle East, Vol VI: Victory in the Mediterranean, Part I: 1st April to 4th June 1944, London: HM Stationery Office, 1987/Uckfield, Naval & Military Press, 2004, ISBN 1-845740-70-X.
- Maj-Gen I.S.O. Playfair, "History of the Second World War, United Kingdom Military Series: The Mediterranean and Middle East", Vol I: The Early Successes against Italy (to May 1941) Archived 28 September 2018 at the Wayback Machine, London: HMSO, 1954/Uckfield, Naval & Military Press, 2004, ISBN 1-845740-65-3.
- Maj-Gen I.S.O. Playfair, History of the Second World War, United Kingdom Military Series: The Mediterranean and Middle East, Vol III: (September 1941 to September 1942) British Fortunes reach their Lowest Ebb, London: HMSO, 1960 /Uckfield, Naval & Military Press, 2004, ISBN 1-845740-67-X
- Maj-Gen I.S.O. Playfair & Brig C.J.C. Molony, History of the Second World War, United Kingdom Military Series: The Mediterranean and Middle East, Vol IV: The Destruction of the Axis forces in Africa, London: HM Stationery Office, 1966/Uckfield, Naval & Military Press, 2004, ISBN 1-845740-68-8.
- Rinaldi, Richard A (2008). Order of Battle of the British Army 1914. Ravi Rikhye. ISBN 978-0-9776072-8-0.
- Col H.C.B. Rogers, The Mounted Troops of the British Army 1066–1945, London: Seeley Service, 1959.
- Edward M. Spiers, The Army and Society 1815–1914, London: Longmans, 1980, ISBN 0-582-48565-7.
- Titles and Designations of Formations and Units of the Territorial Army, London: War Office, 7 November 1927 (RA sections also summarised in Litchfield, Appendix IV).
- Westlake, Ray (1996). British Regiments at Gallipoli. Barnsley: Leo Cooper. ISBN 0-85052-511-X.

=== External links ===
- Anglo Boer War Archived 20 October 2018 at the Wayback Machine
- Chris Baker, The Long, Long Trail Archived 7 March 2022 at the Wayback Machine
- Derek Barton, Royal Artillery 1939–45 Archived 1 March 2021 at the Wayback Machine
- Mark Conrad, The British Army, 1914 (archive site)
- British Army units from 1945 on Archived 29 August 2015 at the Wayback Machine
- The Drill Hall Project Archived 13 August 2015 at the Wayback Machine
- Imperial War Museum, War Memorials Register Archived 10 January 2018 at the Wayback Machine
- T.F. Mills, Land Forces of Britain, the Empire and Commonwealth – Regiments.org (archive site)
- The Regimental Warpath 1914–1918 (archive site)
- Roll of Honour Archived 18 October 2018 at the Wayback Machine
- contact us on the official sussex yeomanry website: sussexyeomanry.org Archived 4 June 2016 at the Wayback Machine
