= Surrey Yeomanry =

Surrey Yeomanry (Queen Mary's Regiment) 98th (Surrey & Sussex Yeomanry, QM) Field Rgt, RA 298th (Surrey Yeomanry, QM) Field Rgt, RA 127 (Sussex Yeomanry) Field Sqn, RE
- Active: 1794–1828; 1831–48; 1901–present
- Country: Kingdom of Great Britain (1794–1800); United Kingdom (1801 – present)
- Branch: British Army
- Type: Yeomanry
- Role: First World War; Yeomanry; Infantry; Second World War; Artillery
- Size: First World War; Three Regiments; Second World War; Two Regiments
- Engagements: First World War; Salonika; Battle of the Somme; Operation Alberich; Second World War (Note: No battle honours were awarded. It is tradition within artillery units that the Regiment's guns represent its colours. The Royal Regiment of Artillery has but one battle honour 'Ubique', meaning 'Everywhere'.); Battle of France; Alamein; Sicily; Italy

Commanders
- Notable commanders: Col George Leslie, 13th Earl of Rothes; Lt-Col Eric Thesiger, DSO, TD

The Surrey Yeomanry was a unit of the British Army first formed as volunteer cavalry in 1794. It was reformed in 1901 and saw varied service in the First World War. During the interwar period, it converted to artillery and during the Second World War one of its regiments distinguished itself during the retreat to Dunkirk, saw action during the Second Battle of El Alamein, and also saw service in Sicily and Italy. Its other regiment served in East Africa, the Siege of Tobruk, and in Iraq and Persia. The regiment's lineage is maintained today by 2 (Surrey Yeomanry) Field Troop, 579 Field Squadron (EOD), part of 101 (City of London) Engineer Regiment (Explosive Ordnance Disposal) (Volunteers).

== French Revolutionary and Napoleonic Wars ==
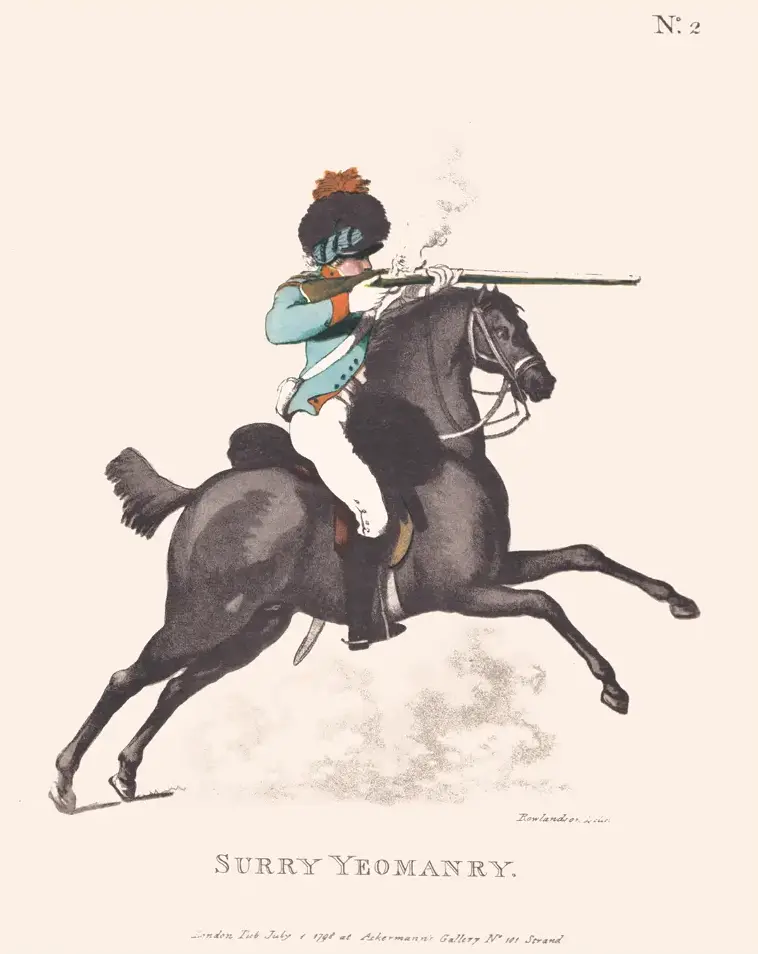
1798 engraving of a Surrey Yeomanry trooper

Following Britain's entry into the French Revolutionary Wars in 1793, British Prime Minister William Pitt the Younger proposed on 14 March 1794 that the counties should form a force of volunteer yeoman cavalry (which became known as the Yeomanry Cavalry) that could be called on by the Crown to defend the country against foreign invasion or by the Lord Lieutenant to suppress civil disorder within the county. Four troops of yeomanry were raised in Surrey on 9 May 1794, and were formed into a regiment in 1797 under the command of Lord Leslie. It was headquartered at Clapham and recruited from London and its suburbs, with many of those in its ranks being men of standing in the City of London. The troops were distributed as follows:

- Battersea Troop
- Clapham Troop
- Wimbledon Troop
- Deptford Troop (actually in Kent)
- Lambeth Troop

In the spring of 1798 the threat of a French-led invasion seemed more acute, and the government encouraged the formation of local armed associations of cavalry and infantry for purely local defence. Although their terms of service were more limited, there was little difference between the Volunteer Cavalry and the Yeomanry. The following cavalry units were on parade when King George III reviewed the Surrey Yeomanry and Volunteers on Wimbledon Common on 4 July 1799:

Left Wing

- Holmesdale Volunteer Cavalry, Lieutenant-Colonel John Petrie, MP for Gatton – 45 men, recruited from Reigate and Dorking
- Clapham Volunteer Cavalry, Lt-Col Samuel Thornton, MP – 40
- Croydon Volunteer Cavalry, Captain John Brickwood – 40
- Wimbledon Volunteer Cavalry, Capt Francis Fowke – 29
- Lambeth Volunteer Cavalry, Lt-Col Sir Robert Burnett – 39
- Wandsworth Volunteer Cavalry, Capt Charles Semple – 25
- Southwark Volunteer Cavalry, Capt John Collingdon – 54
- Woking Volunteer Cavalry, Capt John W. Weston – 40

Right Wing

- Surrey Yeomanry, Colonel Lord Leslie – 253
- Richmond Yeomanry, Major Commandant Sir Robert Baker, 1st Baronet – 80
- Battersea & Streatham Volunteer Cavalry, Capt Henry Thornton, MP – 31

Total cavalry – 676

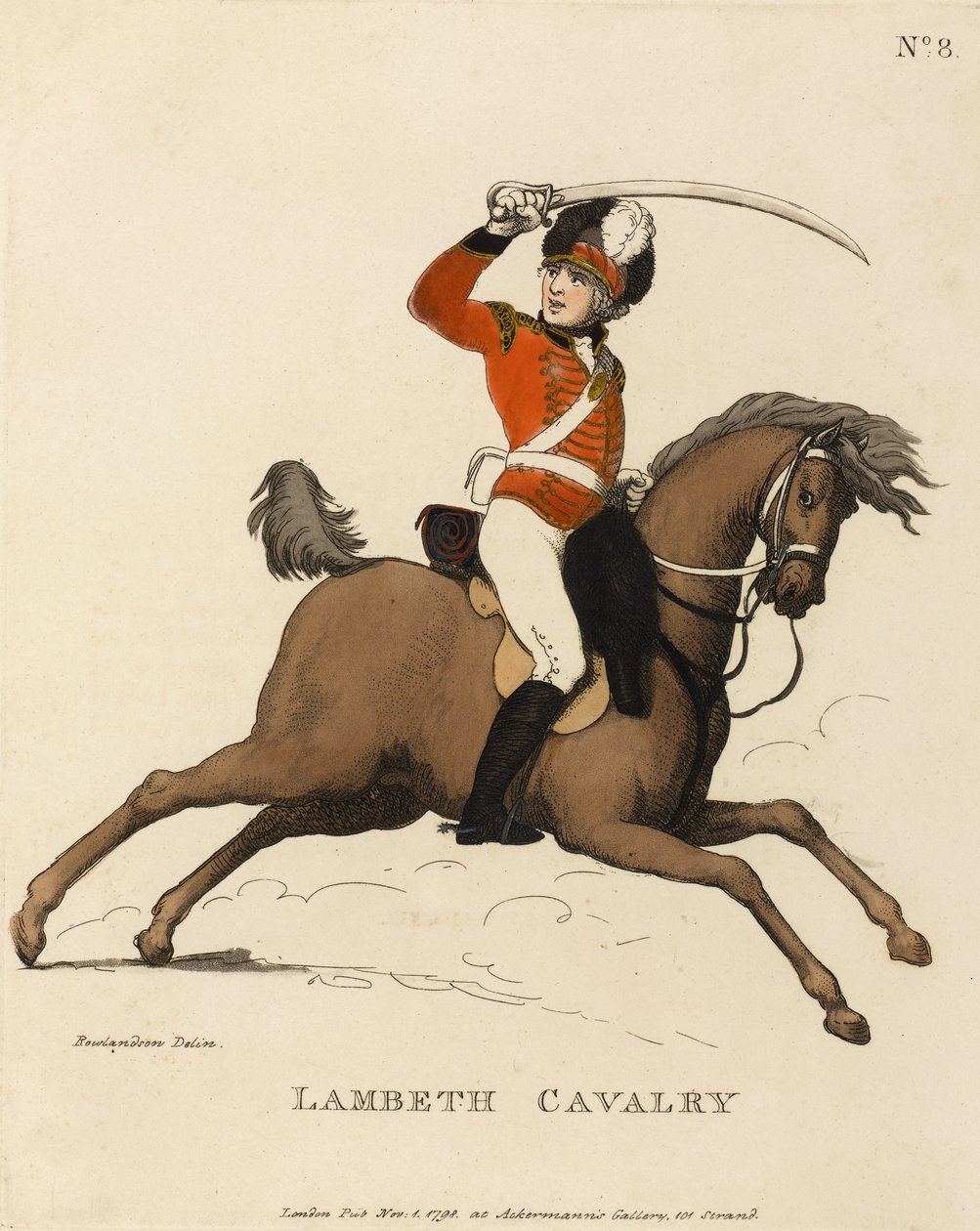
1798 engraving of a Lambeth Volunteer Cavalry trooper

The Volunteers were disbanded when hostilities ended in 1802 with the Treaty of Amiens. When the Peace of Amiens broke down and the war was resumed in 1803, the Volunteers were quickly re-established in larger numbers, some units being reformed (sometimes with a different name), others being newly formed. They still had a variety of terms of service (the Wandsworth Cavalry were restricted to 10 miles (16 km) around Wandsworth) and in some cases they were mixed units of cavalry troops and infantry companies. By 1806 the Yeomanry and Volunteers were grouped under 'inspecting field officers', Surrey having three such 'divisions':

Lt-Col Jackson

- Surrey Yeomen and Riflemen, Col Lord Leslie – 6 Troops (accepted 31 October 1802) + 1 Company (18 July 1803)
- Richmond Yeomanry, Sir Robert Baker, later Lt-Col Smith – 1 Tp (21 August 1803) + 1 Co (22 September 1803)
- Woking Volunteer Cavalry, Capt John W. Weston – 1 Tp (21 August 1803)
- Guildford & Blackheath Volunteer Cavalry, Maj J.M. Molyneux – 2 Tps (21 August 1803)
- Godley Hundred Volunteer Cavalry, Capt Edgell Wyatt – 1 Tp (21 December 1803)
- Croydon Volunteer Cavalry, Capt John Brickwood – 1 Tp (22 September 1803)

Lt-Col Hardy

- Wimbledon Light Horse Volunteers, Capt Benjamin Patterson – 1 Tp (after 1803)
- Clapham Legion, Lt-Col William Prescott, later Maj Brogden – 1 Tp + 3 Cos (22 December 1803)
- Wandsworth Volunteer Cavalry, Capt Charles Semple, later George Tritton – 2 Tps (22 December 1803)

Lt-Col Addenbrooke

- Lambeth Volunteer Cavalry, Capt Joseph Warden, later John Astley – 1 Tp (22 September 1803)
- Southwark Volunteer Cavalry, Capt John Collingdon – 2 Tps (21 August 1803)

Lieutenant-Cols Jackson and Hardy's cavalry units, together with the Berkshire Yeomanry, formed a brigade under Brigadier-General Prince. Lieutenant-Col Addenbrooke's cavalry units were included with the Lambeth and Southwark Volunteer Infantry in an infantry brigade under Brig-Gen Layard.

Enthusiasm for the Volunteers waned as the likelihood of invasion decreased. By 1812 the cavalry Troops of the Lambeth, Richmond, and Southwark Volunteers had disappeared from the lists, and the returns show no 'effective' men for the Croydon, Guildford, Wandsworth or Wimbledon corps. Only the Surrey Yeomanry (184 troopers and 60 riflemen), the Clapham Legion (27 troopers and 114 infantry) and the Egham & Godley Volunteers (40 troopers) were still effective.

== 19th century ==
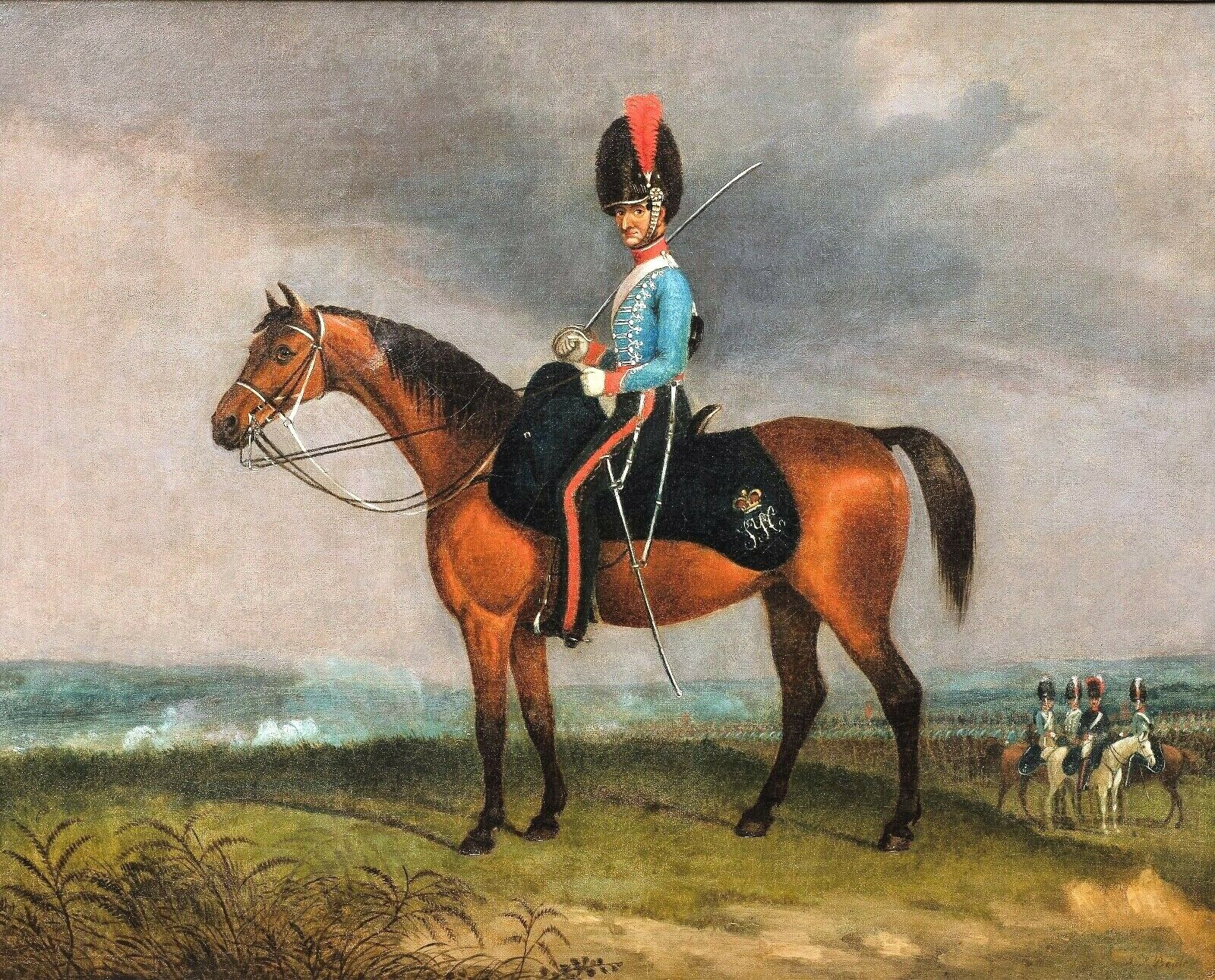
c. 1823 portrait of a Surrey Yeomanry officer

The Volunteers were stood down in 1814, while some of the Yeomanry continued for internal security in the years after Waterloo. The Surrey Yeomanry and the London and Westminster Light Horse provided pickets on Westminster Bridge during crowd trouble in support of Queen Caroline when she was excluded from George IV's coronation in 1820. However, by 1824 all but four troops had disappeared in Surrey, and the whole regiment was disbanded in 1828.

A new Corps of Surrey Yeomanry was raised at Clapham on 12 December 1831 becoming the Surrey Regiment of Yeomanry Cavalry in 1832. However, this too was finally disbanded in 1848. During the enthusiasm for the Rifle Volunteer Movement in the 1860s, a 1st Surrey Mounted Rifle Volunteer Corps was formed at Clapham on 2 April 1860, chiefly composed of foxhunters. It was redesignated the 1st Surrey Light Horse Volunteer Corps in February 1861, but although it held a fundraising Grand Ball in February 1867, it disbanded in 1868.

== Imperial Yeomanry ==
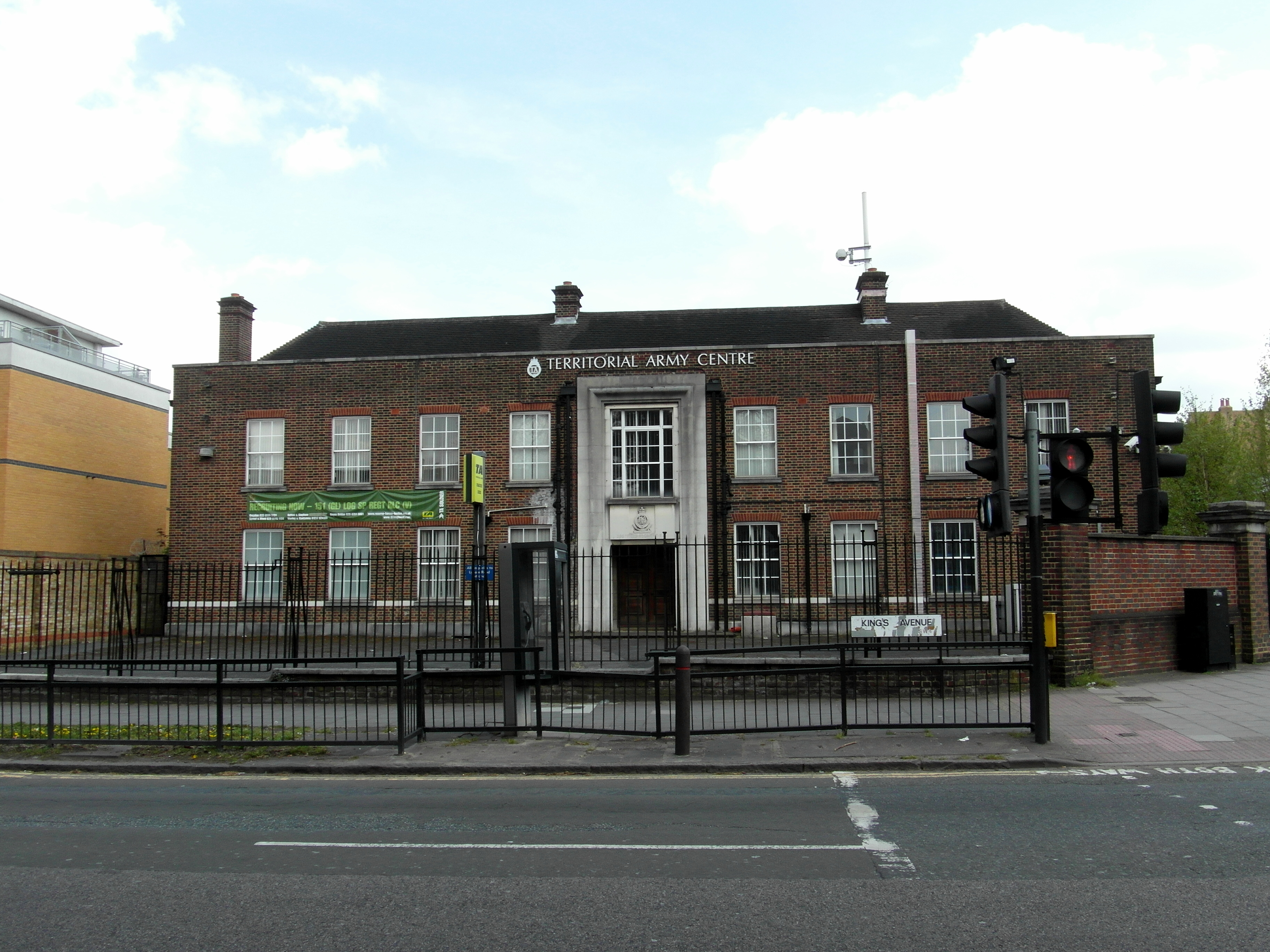
The TA Centre in Kings Avenue, Clapham, as rebuilt with the Surrey Yeomanry badge and '298 Field Regiment RA' inscribed over the doorway.

Following a string of defeats during Black Week in early December 1899, the British government realised that it would need more troops than just the regular army to fight the Second Boer War, especially mounted troops. The Imperial Yeomanry (IY) was accordingly organised as county service companies of volunteers, recruited both from the Yeomanry and from civilians, and was equipped to operate as Mounted infantry. While no Surrey units were formed, a number of returning IY veterans formed a permanent regiment in the county on 30 April 1901, which was granted the title Surrey Imperial Yeomanry (The Princess of Wales's) in June 1902. (It changed the subtitle to (Queen Mary's Regiment) after the accession of the Prince and Princess of Wales as King George V and Queen Mary in 1910.) Recruiting from London and Surrey, it was organised as follows:

- Regimental Headquarters (RHQ) at Clapham Park
- A Squadron at Pimlico
- B Squadron at Guildford
- C Squadron at Epsom
- D Squadron at Wimbledon

== Territorial Force ==
The Imperial Yeomanry were subsumed into the new Territorial Force (TF) under the Haldane Reforms of 1908. Like the other yeomanry regiments the 'Imperial' part of the title was dropped, and the Surrey Yeomanry (QMR) was organised as follows:

- RHQ at Melbourne House, 73 King's Avenue, Clapham Park
- A Squadron at Clapham Park, with a detachment at Aldershot
- B Squadron at 58 Denzil Road, Guildford, with detachments at London Road, Camberley, and at 259 Walton Road, Woking
- C Squadron at Tamworth Road, West Croydon, with a detachment at Clapham
- D Squadron at Coombe Villa, 105 Merton Road, Wimbledon, with a detachment at Clapham
- E (Cadet) Squadron

Equipped and trained as Lancers, the Surrey Yeomanry was attached for field training to the TF's South Eastern Mounted Brigade.

== First World War ==
When the regiment was mobilised on 4 August 1914, it was under the command of Lt-Col Sir John Humphery, one of the Sheriffs of the City of London, who had been commanding officer since 15 May 1912. The regiment immediately went with SE Mounted Bde to its war station in Kent. On the outbreak of war, TF units were invited to volunteer for Overseas Service. (Note: Under the Territorial and Reserve Forces Act 1907 (7 Edw. 7, c.9) which brought the TF into being, it was intended to be a home defence force for service during wartime and members could not be compelled to serve outside the country.) On 31 August, the formation of a reserve or 2nd Line unit was authorised for each 1st Line unit where 60 per cent or more of the men had volunteered for Overseas Service. The titles of these 2nd Line units would be the same as the original, but distinguished by a '2/' prefix, and they took in the many volunteers coming forward. In this way duplicate battalions, brigades and divisions were created, mirroring those TF formations being sent overseas. Later 3rd Line units were formed to provide reinforcement drafts to the 1st and 2nd lines.

=== 1/1st Surrey Yeomanry ===
In November–December 1/1st Surrey Yeomanry was split up to provide a divisional cavalry squadron to each of the three new infantry divisions being formed from battalions brought back from India and other Imperial posts. (Note: After mobilisation the regiment would have adopted the three-squadron organisation of the regular army in place of its four peacetime squadrons.)

==== A Squadron ====
On 21 November 1914 the squadron joined 27th Division at Magdalen Hill Camp, just outside Winchester. The division began embarking at Southampton on 19 December, and the squadron landed at Le Havre on 22 December, making it one of the first TF units to join the British Expeditionary Force (BEF) on the Western Front.

27th Division went into the line at St Eloi south of Ypres on the nights of 5/6 and 6/7 January 1915. The conditions were miserable, and mounted troops could play little part in Trench warfare. Under the command of Maj C.A. Calvert, A Squadron's usual work was road patrols and providing orderlies to headquarters, though they took part in anti-sniper stalking during the German attack on St Eloi on 14–15 March. In April 27 Division moved north as the BEF took over defence of the Ypres Salient. The division played a minor role in the Second Battle of Ypres beginning on 22 April, but on 3 May it had to swing back a little to conform with a withdrawal in the rest of the Salient. In these new positions the division came under heavy attack in the Battle of Frezenberg Ridge (8–13 May) and was in action again at the Battle of Bellewaarde Ridge (23–4 May) when the Germans carried out a gas attack. The squadron's role was to guide supply wagons and reinforcements to and from the line. Other duties included making a dugout for the divisional commander, and working parties spent much of the summer erecting barbed wire in front of the British subsidiary line. It also instructed the newly arrived Westmorland and Cumberland Yeomanry in its duties. From late August the squadron began sending two dismounted Troops at a time to do front line trench duty with Princess Patricia's Canadian Light Infantry.

On 15 November 27th Division began entraining for Marseille, where it embarked for Salonika and finished arriving on 13 February 1916. It went into the line in the Rendina Gorge between Lake Beshik and the sea. In July the Allies began an advance, and on 28 July A Sqn was sent ahead of 27th Division to take over the vital Neohori bridge from the neutral Greeks. By 3 August the division was positioned along the Struma and building defences for the bridge. On the afternoon of 20 August a party drawn from A Sqn, the divisional cyclists and some Royal Engineers went out from the bridgehead and next morning blew up a bridge on the Salonika–Constantinople railway. A Bulgarian force arrived, but the Yeomanry and cyclists gave covering fire while the engineers blew the charges on a second bridge before the party withdrew. The British kept up these raids during the Allied Monastir Offensive in October. On 11 October 1st Battalion York and Lancaster Regiment attempted to drive the enemy out of Bairakli Jum'a; it was supported by A Sqn, an armoured car and two sections of field artillery. The attack was held up by machine gun fire from the Gipsy village on the outskirts of Bairakli Jum'a and the infantry withdrew with serious casualties after being threatened by flank attacks. However, 27th Division continued active patrolling and raids on the Bulgarian side of the Struma.

On 27 December 1916 A and B Sqn (see below) were withdrawn from their respective divisions and 1/1st Surrey Yeomanry reformed as XVI Corps' cavalry regiment. By June 1917 casualties from malaria among troops in the Struma valley became unsupportable, so XVI Corps withdrew behind the river, leaving the Bulgarian side as a wide No man's land patrolled daily by the Surrey Yeomanry and 1/1st Derbyshire Yeomanry with the corps cyclists. On 22 July a squadron of the Surreys supported 1st Bn Royal Scots in a successful dawn raid on Homondos, four miles over the river. At the end of the fever season XVI Corps reoccupied the Bulgarian side of the river in October as its winter line: the open right flank was to be covered by constant patrolling by the Surrey and Derbyshire Yeomanry. This was carried out in a snowstorm on the night of 14 October, including a second raid on Homondos. The Struma Front remained relatively quiet until June 1918 when XVI Corps was relieved by Greek troops and moved to the Lake Doiran sector. The final Allied offensive began in September, with XVI attacking at the Third Battle of Doiran on 28 September without success. But by 22 September the Bulgarian front was crumbling, and XVI Corps HQ with its attached troops took over the left flank of the British Salonika Army (BSA) to continue the pursuit. On 24 September the Surrey Yeomanry were attached to 65th Brigade as the advanced guard of 22nd Division. The Yeomanry led the advance through rugged country and were shelled by several batteries, which forced them to dismount and continue on foot. Eventually the regiment had to give up the pursuit with its horses completely exhausted and without water.Next day it continued in support of the infantry until they too became exhausted. The Armistice of Salonica ended the fighting with Bulgaria on 30 September. The BSA then began advancing across Bulgaria to open a new front against the Turkish Army, but the Turks signed the Armistice of Mudros on 30 October.

==== B Squadron ====
B Squadron joined 28th Division at Magdalen Hill Camp on 22 December immediately after 27th Division had vacated it. The division embarked for the Western Front 15–18 January 1915 and went into the line alongside 27th Division in V Corps. Under the command of Maj G.O. Borwick, the squadron's experiences were similar to A Sqn, providing mounted police patrols, conducting night-time anti-sniper sweeps, and fatigue parties for sandbag filling and trench digging (while their horses got fatter, the war diary complained). It also provided burial parties during the Battle of Loos. 28th Division was sent to Marseille a month before 27th Division and sailed first to Alexandria, B Sqn arriving on 11 November. It was then shipped to Salonika, arriving on 2 December. Thereafter its experiences were similar to A Sqn with 27th Division. On 27 December B Sqn rejoined A Sqn in XVI Corps Cavalry Regiment. (see above).

==== C Squadron ====
C Squadron joined 29th Division in Warwickshire in January 1915. The division was then sent to Avonmouth Docks, where C Sqn embarked on 17 March, arriving at Alexandria on 2 April. The squadron was left in Egypt while the rest of 29th Division took part in the Gallipoli campaign. Then on 26 June it was landed at the island of Imbros, the offshore base for the Gallipoli operations, where it served with General Headquarters, Mediterranean Expeditionary Force. After the force had been evacuated from Gallipoli, C Sqn was sent back to Egypt in February 1916 and was stationed at scattered locations. On 1 March it was concentrated and sailed to Marseille aboard the Nessian with 29th Division, landing on 11 March and going to the Western Front.

Under the command of Maj R. Bonsor, the squadron underwent training with new equipment used on the Western Front, including respirators and hand grenades, then went into billets at Acheux, providing working parties. It briefly (11–19 May) served with XV Corps Cavalry Regiment at Heilly, then on 19 May it joined C and D Squadrons of the Duke of Lancaster's Own Yeomanry (DoLOY) at Beaucourt to form III Corps Cavalry Regiment.

III Corps was heavily engaged in the Battle of the Somme throughout the summer of 1916. From its camp at Dernancourt the squadron sent a party to hold the 'remains' of a trench on the First day of the Somme (1 July) until the area was taken over the artillery four days later. As the battle continued, the squadron was at Bavelincourt, sending Troops to be attached to different divisions as despatch riders or to the military police for traffic control. In the autumn the squadron sent a dismounted draft to reinforce 10th (Service) Battalion, Queen's (Royal West Surrey Regiment) (Battersea), originally a 'Pals battalion' of Kitchener's Army, in 41st Division. In the winter the squadron helped with pack horses getting supplies up to the line. At the end of January 1917 the regiment moved to Ailly-sur-Somme, then on to Warfusée.

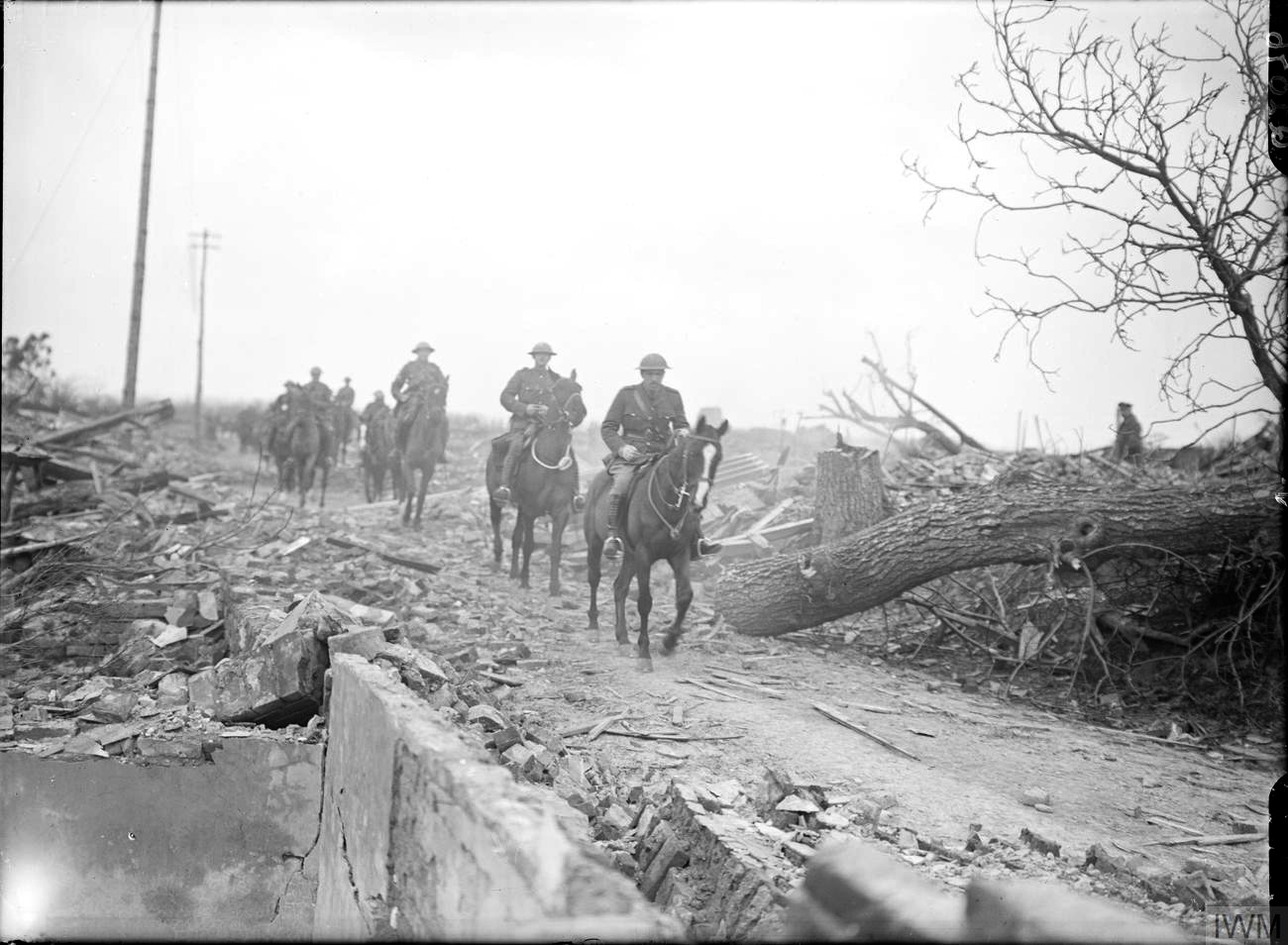
A patrol of C Sqn 1/1st Surrey Yeomanry passing through the ruined village of Caulaincourt during the German retreat to the Hindenburg Line, March 1917.

In March the German Army began withdrawing to the Hindenburg Line (Operation Alberich) and on 20 March the Surrey Yeomanry squadron was ordered forward to cross the Somme and discover where the Germans were. Next day its patrols skirmished with German rearguards at Vermand, suffering a few casualties. It then held a line around Bernes until relieved on 24 March, remaining at Vraignes thereafter under occasional shellfire. The squadron underwent training in April before relieving D Sqn DoLOY attached to 48th (South Midland) Division, later 42nd (East Lancashire) Division, manning the front line at Villers-Faucon. It returned to Roisel in mid-May.

On 1 July 1917, III Corps Cavalry Regiment was ordered to be dismounted and sent for infantry training; all the horses had been sent away by 24 July. The Surrey Yeomanry squadron was rejoined by Maj the Hon Eric Thesiger, a prewar officer of the regiment. In September 1917 it was drafted into 10th Bn Queen's (the DoLOY squadrons were posted to a battalion of the Manchester Regiment). Major Thesiger became second-in-command of the 10th Queen's, and on 7 October was formally transferred to that regiment. He then moved to the King's Royal Rifle Corps and Major Bonsor became second-in-command of 10th Queen's. 41st Division went to the Italian Front in November, then returned to France in early 1918 and fought through the German spring offensive. Thesiger returned to command 10th Queen's after the offensive ended, later transferring to the 10th (Service) Bn (Kent County), Royal West Kent Regiment. 10th Queen's with its remaining Surrey yeomen then fought through the final Allied Hundred Days Offensive.

=== 2/1st Surrey Yeomanry ===
The 2nd Line regiment was formed at Clapham in September 1914 and moved to Dorking. By May 1915 it was at Maresfield, in September at Wrotham and in the winter of 1915–16 it was at Hastings, possibly in 1/1st South Western Mounted Brigade which became 2/1st Southern Mounted Brigade. On 31 March 1916, the remaining Mounted Brigades were ordered to be numbered in a single sequence; the brigade was numbered as 16th Mounted Brigade and joined a new 4th Mounted Division in the Manningtree area.

In July 1916, 4th Mounted Division became 2nd Cyclist Division and the regiment was converted to a cyclist unit in 7th Cyclist Brigade at Woodbridge. In October the regiment sent a draft of 191 men to reinforce the 12th (Service) Battalion, East Surrey Regiment (Bermondsey) serving on the Western Front. In November 1916 the division was broken up and the regiment was merged with the 2/1st Sussex Yeomanry to form 8th (Surrey and Sussex) Yeomanry Cyclist Regiment in 3rd Cyclist Brigade at Ipswich. In March 1917 it resumed its identity as 2/1st Surrey Yeomanry at Ipswich, and by July had moved back to the Woodbridge area. In May 1918, the regiment moved with 3rd Cyclist Brigade to Ireland. It was stationed at Athlone and Galway; there was no further change before the end of the war. It was disbanded at The Curragh on 3 February 1920, when its remaining personnel were drafted to 5th and 6th Divisions.

=== 3/1st Surrey Yeomanry ===
The 3rd Line regiment was formed in February 1915 at Clapham and in June it was affiliated to the 3rd Reserve Cavalry Regiment at Canterbury. Early in 1917 it was absorbed in the 1st Reserve Cavalry Regiment at The Curragh.

== Between the wars ==
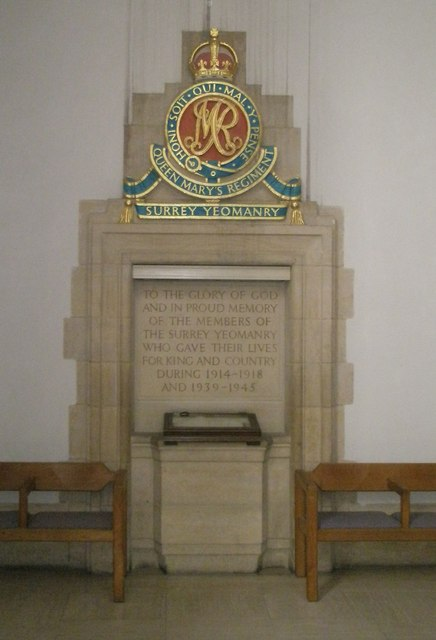
Memorial to the Surrey Yeomanry dead of WWI and WWII, inside Guildford Cathedral. Photo 2009.

In February 1920 The Surrey Yeomanry (Queen Mary's Regiment) (TF) was reformed, Headquarters once again opened at 73 King's Avenue, Clapham, London. With the South-Eastern Mounted Brigade (TF) having been disbanded, the Surrey Yeomanry was reformed as an Army Troops unit within Eastern Command. In November 1921 the Territorial Force was renamed as The Territorial Army. However, the post-war reorganisations of the Territorials made most of its Yeomanry Cavalry Regiments surplus to requirements and in early 1922 it was announced that the Surrey Yeomanry would convert to Royal Field Artillery and provide two batteries to an existing Brigade, 98th (Sussex Yeomanry) Army Brigade, RFA (TF). This had been formed in 1920 by the conversion to Artillery of the Sussex Yeomanry and comprised Headquarters and 389th (Sussex Yeomanry) Battery at Brighton and 390th (Sussex Yeomanry) Battery at Chichester. The Surrey Yeomanry would then form 391st (Surrey Yeomanry) and 392nd (Surrey Yeomanry) (Howitzer) Batteries, both at Clapham. As a result of this merger, the brigade was redesignated as 98th (Surrey and Sussex Yeomanry) Brigade, RFA (TA). The unit was among the 'Army Troops' administered by 44th (Home Counties) Divisional Area.

A reorganisation of TA Field Forces was announced in February 1938, and as part of this the brigade redesignated 98th (Surrey and Sussex Yeomanry, Queen Mary's) Army Field Regiment, RA (TA). It was ordered to reorganise and reduce to two batteries, in line with the new establishment for TA Field Artillery, but this reorganisation did not immediately come into effect. In March 1939 the War Office ordered the doubling of the Territorial Army and this enabled the regiment to shed its two surplus batteries. The Sussex Yeomanry Batteries were withdrawn and formed into a duplicate regiment, 144th (Sussex Yeomanry) Army Field Regiment, leaving the original regiment comprising Headquarters, 391st and 392nd Field Batteries. (Note: Although one source suggests that each regiment had one Surrey and one Sussex battery, the last detailed Monthly Army List published before the war (May 1939) confirms that 389 and 390 Btys (144th Fd Rgt) were titled 'Sussex Yeomanry' and 391 and 392 (98th Fd Rgt) were 'Surrey Yeomanry'.)

== Second World War ==
=== 98th Field Regiment (Surrey & Sussex Yeomanry Queen Mary's) ===
==== Battle of France ====
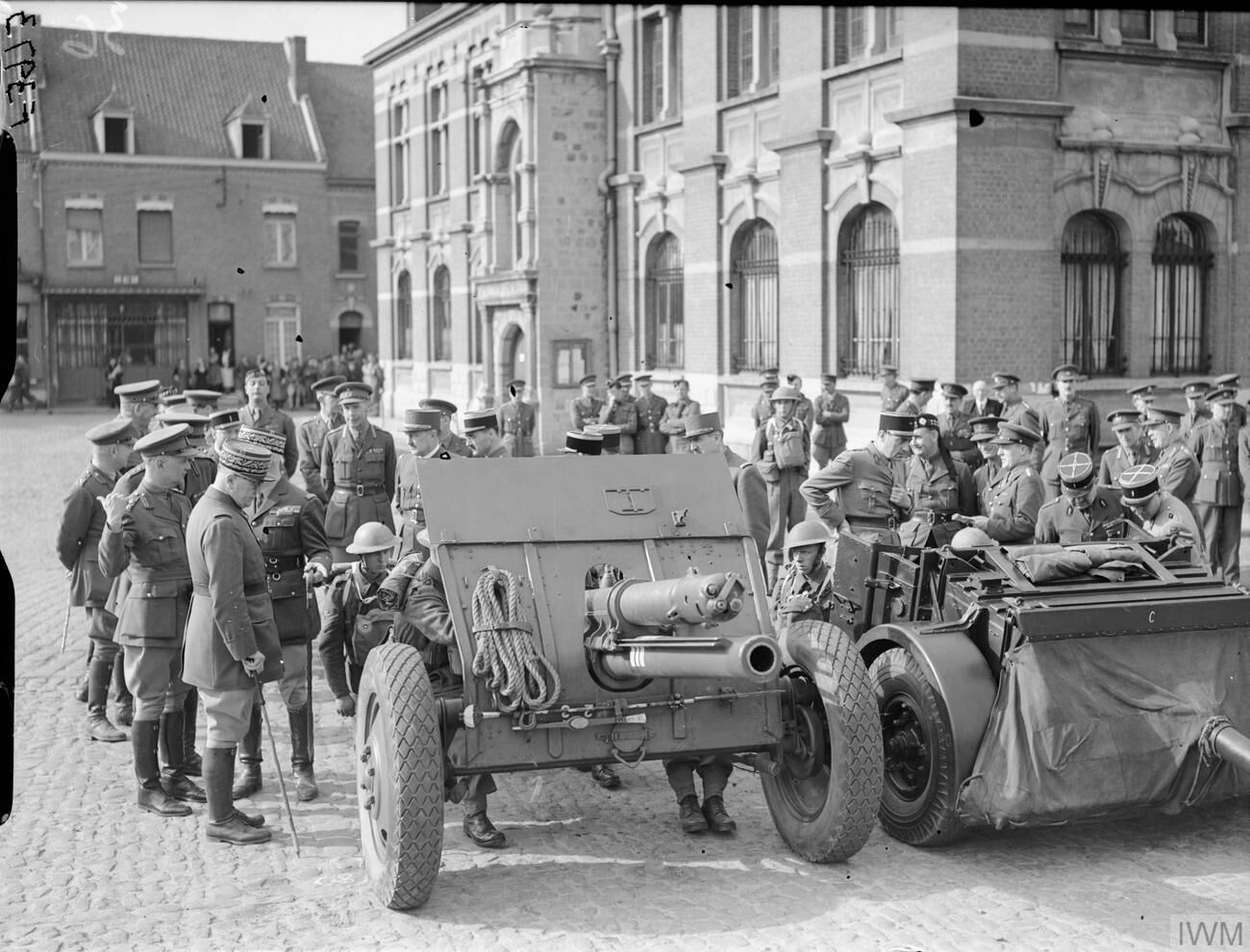
18-Pounder being inspected in France, April 1940.

The regiment mobilised at Worthing under Lt-Col G.A. Ledingham, MC, TD, who had been the commanding officer (CO) since 1937, and it joined I Corps of the British Expeditionary Force (BEF) in France by 27 September 1939. Its guns were First World War-era vintage 18-pounders, some handed over by 1st and 2nd Regiments Royal Horse Artillery who were receiving more modern guns, and 98th also took over vehicles from its sister regiment, 144th.

On 10 May 1940, the Phoney War ended with the German invasion of the Low Countries, so the BEF followed the pre-arranged Plan D and advanced into Belgium to take up defences along the River Dyle. 98th (S&SY) Field Rgt was with I Corps on the Dyle Line by 15 May 1940. However, the Panzers of the Wehrmacht's Army Group A had broken through the Ardennes and threatened the BEF's flank, so on 16 May it began to withdraw to the River Escaut. The regiment was with I Corps on the Escaut Line by 21 May 1940.

By now the enemy was in the BEF's rear. To hold the line of the Aire Canal north of Saint-Omer the BEF organised a scratch force of rear elements ('Polforce'), and on 22 May 392 Bty was hastily sent to join the defenders on the Canal Line. The battery only had seven 18-pounders, so each was sent to cover one of the bridges against the advancing 1st Panzer Division:

- Hazebrouck: 15 minutes after digging in, the gun stopped an enemy column, knocking out the lead vehicles. It was then attacked by 11 tanks, putting one (possibly two) out of action before the gun crew were all wounded and the ammunition limber blown up. The gun was withdrawn with its wounded detachment.
- Arques: Sappers were blowing up the bridge when the gun arrived. Advancing enemy troops were firing on and nearing the gun position when it was relieved by the 12th Royal Lancers and withdrawn.
- Renescure: The gun destroyed enemy-held houses across the bridge and remained in action until late afternoon. One enemy tank was destroyed but mortar fire on the gun position forced a withdrawal; as the gun was being limbered up the tractor was hit and the position overrun.
- Wardrecques: The gun supported a party of French infantry, destroying houses opposite and silencing a machine gun, but heavy fire drove the French back and although the gun remained in action it was destroyed by a direct hit shortly afterwards.
- Blaringhem: The gun covered French and British troops. A morning attack was repulsed with the destruction of an enemy tank and two troop carriers. During another attack the gun fired 130 rounds before the enemy closed in. A shell broke the limber connection and the gun had to be abandoned.
- Wittes: This gun was in position during the night of 22/23 May. Nothing further was heard of it and the detachment was captured.
- Saint-Momelin: Here the bridge was held for three days with the help of gunners of 51st (Lowland) Heavy Rgt armed with a few rifles and Bren guns. The gun destroyed enemy-held houses and mortar positions across the canal and being well dug in it survived all retaliation and repulsed all attempts to cross. The gunners had the satisfaction of intercepting a German radio message that said 'Bridge at Momelin strongly held, try elsewhere'. The defenders at St Momelin were relieved by French troops on 25 May.

The RA regimental historian wrote: 'Seldom have two troops of field guns done so much to hold off an armoured division for so long. The delay they caused was vital and saved many Allied lives'.

The regiment then fell back into the 'pocket' round Dunkirk from which the BEF was preparing evacuation (Operation Dynamo). Without the support of a divisional structure the Army field regiments had a difficult time, having to fend for themselves. 98th (S&SY) Field Rgt attached itself to 44th (HC) Division, but got caught in a traffic jam at Saint-Jans-Cappel on 29 May and the gunners were forced to destroy and abandon their guns and vehicles before proceeding on foot to the beaches for evacuation.

==== Home defence ====
On arrival in England the regiment was sent to Okehampton Camp, and then to join a scratch '1st Infantry Brigade' formed by the Royal Artillery at Bourne, Lincolnshire. Detachments were sent to the Sussex coast on anti-invasion duties manning 12-pounder and 4-inch naval guns mounted on Albion and Scammell lorries. By July the rest of the regiment was manning tradesmen's vans and an old Rolls-Royce car, first at Hall Green, Birmingham, then Ince Blundell, Lancashire, (where the Sussex detachments rejoined), and in October at Huyton, Lancashire. Detachments of gunners were sent out to man roadblocks and static guns. Part of 391 Bty was at Barford in the outer defences of Birmingham with Hotchkiss 6-pounders, the rest at Tarvin on airfield defence. 392 Battery was in detachments from Maryport to Speke with weapons ranging from obsolete 6-pounders to 1913-vintage 13-pounders.

In December 1940 the regiment went to Portsmouth in Southern Command, where it joined V Corps. When field regiments were reorganised on a three-battery basis, 98th (S&SY) Fd Rgt formed 471 Bty in January 1941, armed with four French 75mm guns, while 391 and 392 Btys each had two of the new 25-pounders. By April 1941 the regiment was fully equipped with 24 x 25-pounders. It also gained an attached Royal Corps of Signals section and a Light Aid Detachment (LAD) of the Royal Electrical and Mechanical Engineers. The regiment did a spell as depot regiment at the School of Artillery at Larkhill Camp and was later stationed at Sturminster Marshall, the Isle of Wight, and Wimborne Minster. At the beginning of May 1942 the regiment came under direct War Office control preparatory to proceeding overseas.

==== North Africa ====
98th (S&SY) Field Regiment landed in Egypt where on 19 September 1942 it joined 10th Armoured Division in Eighth Army. It was equipped with 24 x 25-pounders with Stuart light tanks as observation posts (OPs).

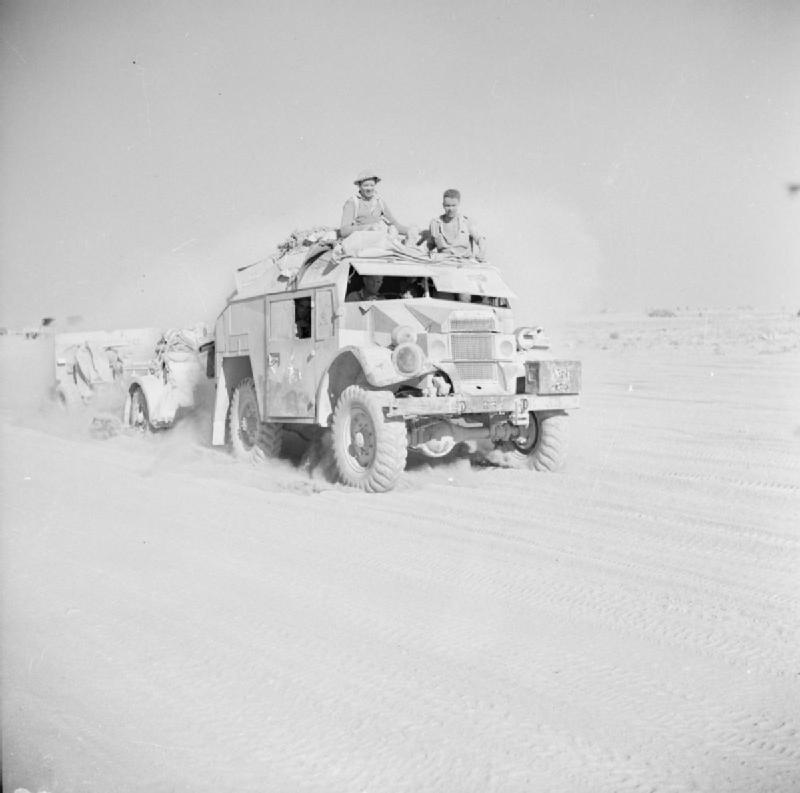
25-pounder and Quad tractor moving up to the front in the Western Desert, 29 October 1942.

On the second night of the Second Battle of El Alamein (24/25 October), 10th Armoured Division advanced with strong artillery support from its own regiments and several others, but the tanks could not keep up with the barrage and struggled up to Miteirya Ridge. On 27/28 October the division's lorried infantry brigade attacked the 'Woodcock' and 'Snipe' objectives, but because of the confusion on the objectives the artillery plan had to be very simple, and communication between brigade HQ and the guns broke down. The infantry took serious casualties and dug in short of their objectives. 10th Armoured Division was withdrawn into reserve, but after the battle it took part in the pursuit to Mersa Matruh.

After Matruh, 10th Armoured Division withdrew to the Nile Delta, and on 29 December 98th (S&SY) Fd Rgt came under Middle East Forces. In Egypt it re-equipped with M7 Priest 105mm self-propelled (SP) guns.

==== Sicily and Italy ====
98th (S&SY) Field Regiment rejoined Eighth Army for the Allied invasion of Sicily (Operation Husky) in July 1943. The landings began on 10 July. On 13 July a Commando and paratroop attack (Operation Fustian) had seized Primosole Bridge over the Simeto river and prevented its demolition, but had been unable to retain possession of the bridge. Early on 15 July the SP guns of 98th (S&SY) and 24th Fd Rgts were brought up to support 50th (Northumbrian) Infantry Division and 4th Armoured Brigade in their renewed attempts to gain a bridgehead. Aided by a heavy barrage, three battalions of the Durham Light Infantry (DLI) forced their way across.

The regiment came into action again on 17 July, together with six other field and medium regiments, in support of an attack on the Fossa Bottaceto, south of Catania, by 6th and 9th Bns DLI and the tanks of 3rd County of London Yeomanry (Sharpshooters). The guns fired a concentration for 30 minutes before Zero (which was at 01.00), then barrages and concentrations as required. The operation bogged down in close country and an attempt to restart it the next night broke down when the artillery was directed to fire on the Bottaceto itself, while German troops were still in position in front of it.

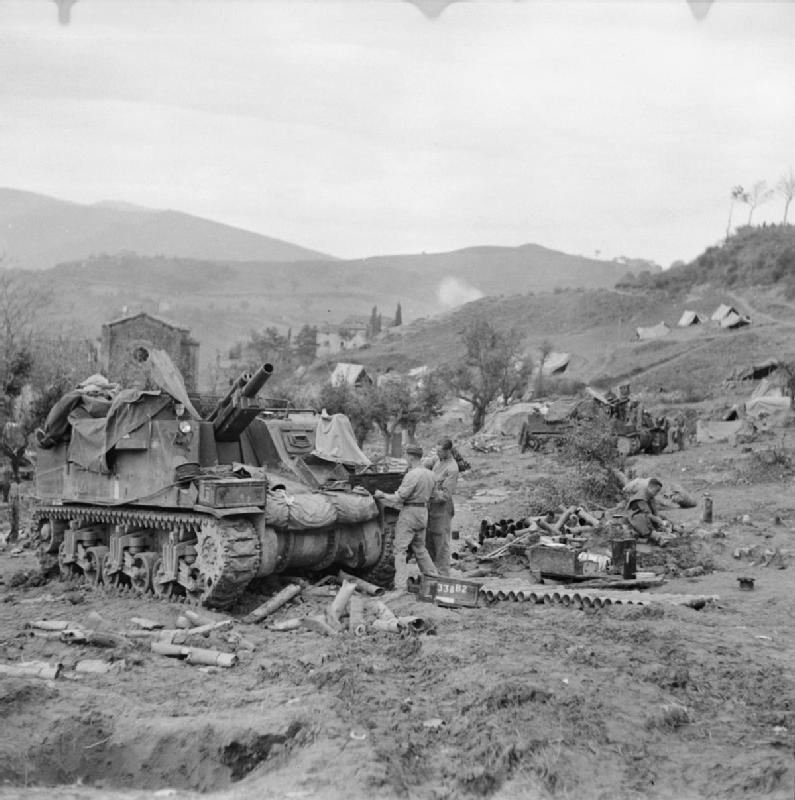
105mm Priest SP gun supporting 78th Division in Italy.

After Sicily had been secured, Eighth Army moved to the invasion of mainland Italy, crossing the Strait of Messina to land around Reggio di Calabria on 3 September (Operation Baytown). From Reggio, 98th (S&SY) Fd Rgt moved to Taranto where in October it embarked in Landing Ships, Tank for a four-day voyage round the 'heel' of Italy to Manfredonia, from where it advanced to Foggia. By November, Eighth Army faced the Germans' Bernhardt Line. An assault crossing of the River Sangro on 28 November by V Corps was supported by massive artillery fire, the field regiments (98th (S&SY) being attached to 78th Division for the operation) firing over 600 rounds per gun in the first three days. On 9 December 1st Canadian Division joined the battle round the Moro River, with 98th (S&SY) Fd Rgt among the units firing in support.

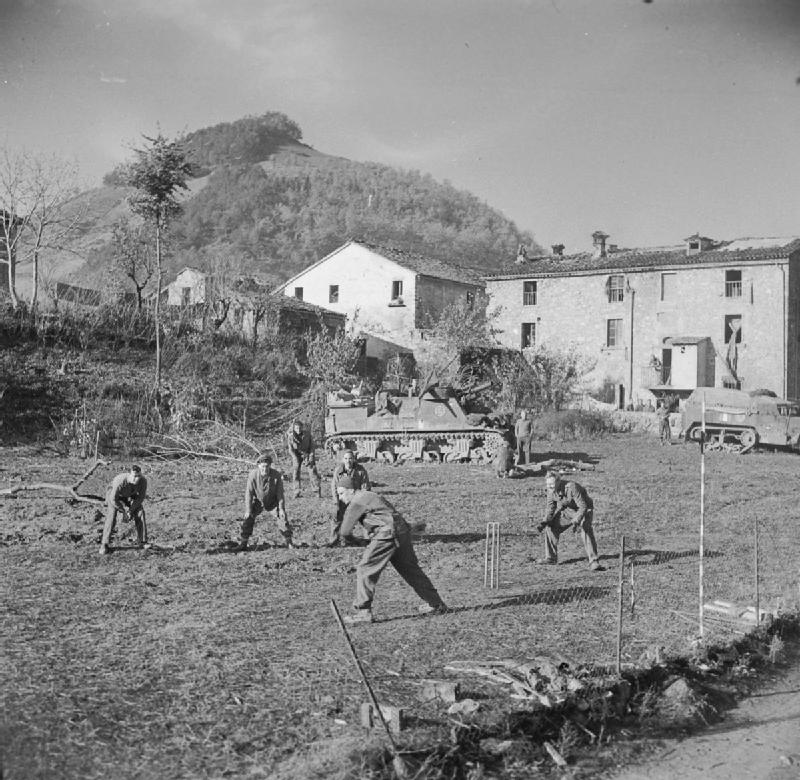
Gunners of the Surrey & Sussex Yeomanry play an impromptu game of cricket in front of their Priest SP guns in Italy.

By January 1944 the regiment had been switched to the other side of Italy to join in X Corps' assault crossing of the Garigliano. The operation began on the night of 17/18 January with 98th (S&SY) Fd Rgt firing in support of 5th Division after the infantry had made a silent crossing. The opening of the 1944 Allied spring offensive in Italy saw 98th (S&SY) Fd Rgt assigned to 8th Indian Division to force a crossing of the River Gari as part of Operation Diadem. The attack began at 23.45 on the night of 11/12 May, with every gun employed in counter-battery bombardment from 23.00 to 23.40. The field guns concentrated on the Nebelwerfer mortar positions and then fired a creeping barrage for the infantry advancing at a rate of 100 yards (91 m) in six minutes. The leading battalions of 8th Indian Division crossed without much difficulty, covered by mist in the river valley, but aroused by the preliminary bombardment the Germans brought down their arranged defensive fire. The infantry were pinned down and dug in, while the barrage rolled away from them beyond the German positions. By morning they had won a small bridgehead, bridges were being built and the first armour crossed before nightfall.

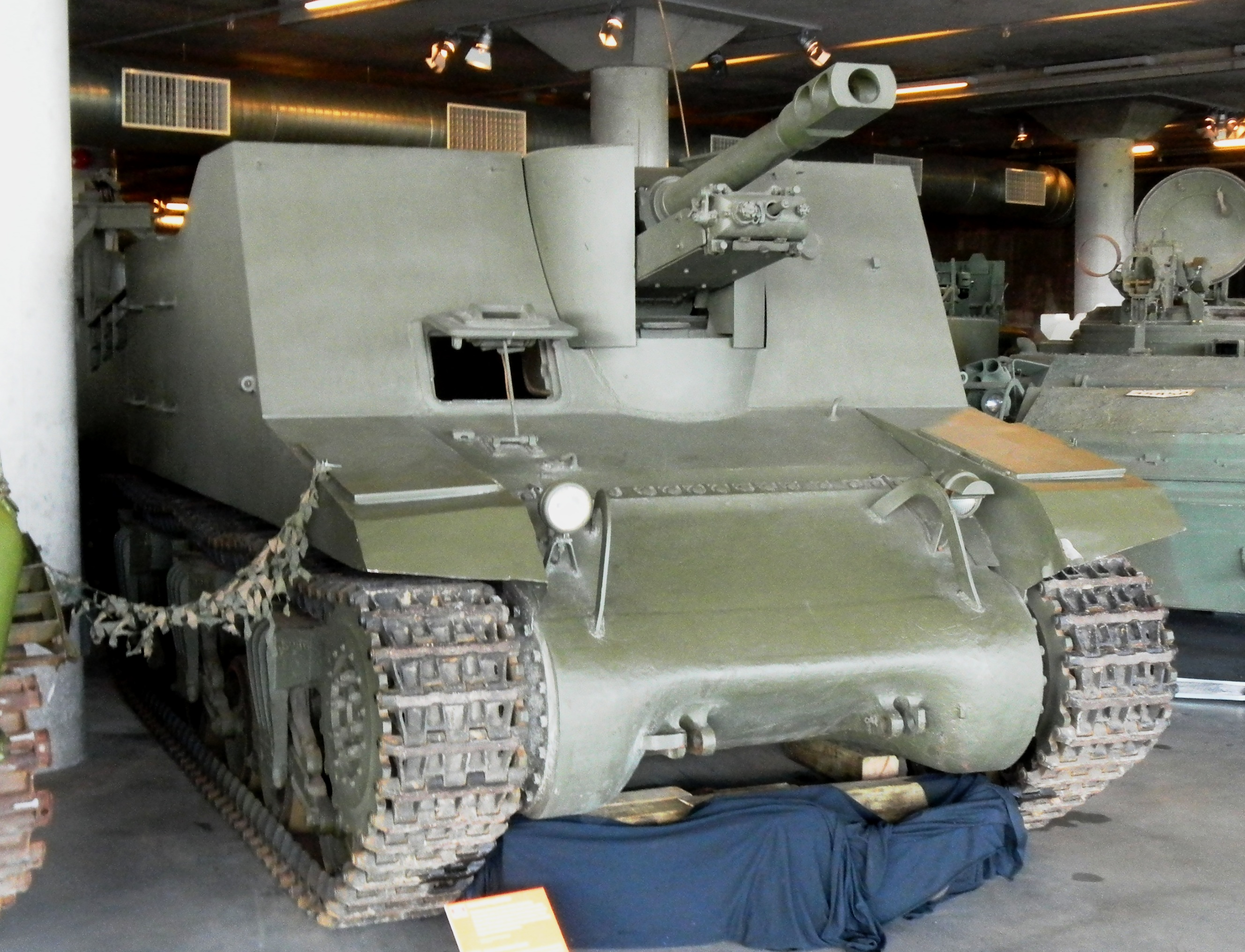
Preserved Sexton 25-pounder SP gun.

After the fall of Rome on 4 June, the Allies pressed the German forces back to the Gothic Line, where the advance bogged down again.

==== North West Europe ====
In the winter of 1944–45 a number of units and formations were transferred from the Italian Front to 21st Army Group fighting in North West Europe. 98th (S&SY) Field Regiment was one of those sent in March 1945, and was re-equipped with Sexton 25-pounder SP guns. The regiment served in the Netherlands and in April 1945 it moved to Lübeck in Germany with the occupation forces. Demobilisation began in October 1945 and the regiment passed into suspended animation in June 1946.

=== 144th Field Regiment (Surrey & Sussex Yeomanry Queen Mary's) ===
See main article 144th Field Regiment (Surrey & Sussex Yeomanry Queen Mary's)

The 144th Field Regiment remained in the United Kingdom in the early war years as part of Home Forces, attached to 4th Division after its return from the Dunkirk evacuation. In November 1940 they were sent to Egypt and then attached to the 5th Indian Division seeing service in the Sudan, Abyssinia and Eritrea it was at Keru Gorge that 390 Battery were charged by about 60 Eritrean cavalry, almost certainly the last cavalry charge on the British Army. The regiment returned to Egypt with the division before being attached to the 70th Infantry Division during the Siege of Tobruk in September 1941. After being withdrawn from Tobruk they were briefly attached to the 4th Indian Division in early 1942 and the British 1st Armoured Division in February to April 1942. In May 1942 they were sent to Iraq with the 10th Army attached to the 17th Indian Infantry Brigade and then to 31st Indian Armoured Division. They remained with this formation until the end of the war serving in Syria, Persia, Egypt, Palestine and Lebanon.

== Postwar ==
In 1947 98th (S&SY) Field Rgt was reformed as the 298th (Surrey Yeomanry, Queen Mary's) Field Regiment, while 144th Field Rgt reformed as 344th (Sussex Yeomanry) Light Anti-Aircraft/Searchlight Regiment. The 298th amalgamated with 263rd (6th London) Field Regiment, 291st (4th London) Field Regiment, and 381st (East Surrey) Light Regiment to form 263rd (Surrey Yeomanry, Queen's Mary's) Field Regiment in 1961. The unit was disbanded in 1967 but reformed as B (Surrey Yeomanry) Troop, 200 (Sussex Yeomanry) Field Battery, 100 Medium Regiment RA (V) in 1969.

In April 1971 the unit was re-designated D (Surrey Yeomanry) Battery, 6th (V) Battalion, The Queen's Regiment. In April 1975 the battalion amalgamated with the 7th (Volunteer) Battalion to form 6th/7th (Volunteer) Battalion but the Surrey Yeomanry lineage was discontinued at that time.

In October 1992 2 (Surrey Yeomanry) Troop, 127 (Sussex Yeomanry) Field Squadron, 78th (Fortress) Engineer Regiment, RE (V) was formed; in July 1999 this unit was transferred to 579 Field Squadron (EOD), part of 101 (London) Engineer Regiment (Explosive Ordnance Disposal) (Volunteers) at Redhill Army Reserve Centre.

== Uniforms and insignia ==
The original Surrey Yeomanry wore a light blue uniform with silver braid and buttons, and a large scarlet plume in the Tarleton helmet. The facings were red, changing to black in about 1806. The boots were plain black with tassels, and buff gloves were worn. Around 1819 the officers' headdress was a bearskin or beaverskin cap with white cap lines, and they wore a plain crimson sash. Pale blue was an unusual colour for a British military uniform, and may have been unique to this unit among the yeomanry and volunteers of the time, who normally wore red or blue (such as the Southwark Cavalry illustrated at right).

Following the South African War yeomanry regiments were encouraged to discard their expensive and colourful 19th century uniforms in favour of the newly introduced khaki service dress of 1902. While understandable as an economy measure this policy overlooked the importance of "the peacock factor" in attracting volunteer recruits. Accordingly, most long-established yeomanry regiments reverted to simplified versions of their traditionally elaborate parade and off-duty uniforms within a few years. A notable exception was the Surrey Yeomanry, which adopted the khaki uniform of the New South Wales Lancers as a model from 1901. Even this was ornamented by the addition of a detachable scarlet plastron and facings for parade, together with green feather plumes on the slouch hats. In 1912 a compromise dark blue full dress of simple design with blue facigs was adopted, while the standard khaki service dress of British mounted troops was worn for training and ordinary duties.

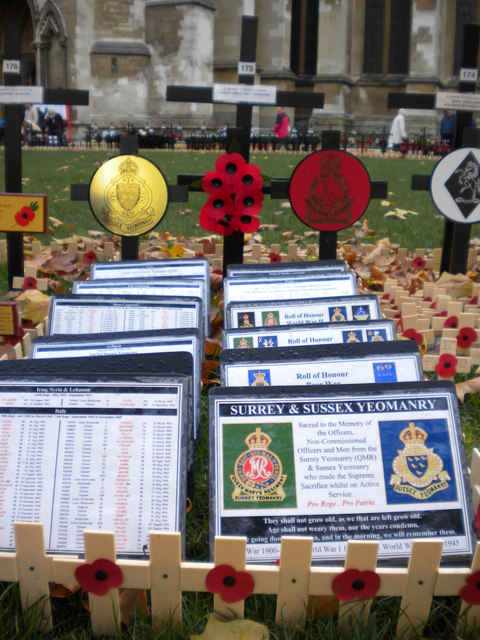
Surrey & Sussex Yeomanry remembered at the Field of Remembrance, Westminster Abbey, November 2009.

Between 1922 and 1930, 98th Field Brigade is believed to have worn an embroidered arm badge with '98' over 'Bde' in a circle in red. on a dark blue background. The RA cap badge was at first worn by all batteries of 98th Field Bde, but after 1930 the batteries wore their Surrey or Sussex Yeomanry cap and collar badges as appropriate. This continued during the Second World War, with both regiments also wearing an embroidered shoulder title with 'SURREY & SUSSEX' over 'YEOMANRY Q.M.R.' in yellow on navy blue. In the Middle East they wore brass shoulder titles on khaki drill jackets, with 'S&Sx.Yeo' for 98th Field Rgt and 'SSY' for 144th Field Rgt. After the war, both regiments retained their respective Surrey or Sussex Yeomanry cap badges and yellow on navy shoulder titles, 'SURREY YEOMANRY Q.M.R.' for 298th Field Rgt and 'SUSSEX YEOMANRY' for 344th LAA/SL Rgt.

== Honorary Colonels ==
The following served as Honorary Colonel of the unit:

- St John Brodrick, 1st Earl of Midleton, appointed (to Surrey Yeomanry) 28 September 1901 (joint Hon Col from 1922)
- Charles Wyndham, 3rd Baron Leconfield, appointed (to joint regiment) 13 December 1922

== Museum ==
There is a small collection of items associated with the Surrey and Sussex Yeomanry hosted at Newhaven Fort.

== See also ==
- Imperial Yeomanry
- List of Yeomanry Regiments 1908
- Yeomanry
- Yeomanry order of precedence
- British yeomanry during the First World War
- Second line yeomanry regiments of the British Army
- List of British Army Yeomanry Regiments converted to Royal Artillery

== Bibliography ==
- J. Aston & L.M. Duggan, The History of the 12th (Bermondsey) Battalion East Surrey Regiment, Union Press, 1936/Uckfield: Naval & Military Press, 2005, ISBN 978-1-845742-75-1.
- B.S. Barnes, The Sign of the Double 'T' (The 50th Northumbrian Division – July 1943 to December 1944), Market Weighton: Sentinel Press, 2nd Edn 2008, ISBN 978-0-9534262-0-1.
- Maj A.F. Becke,History of the Great War: Order of Battle of Divisions, Part 1: The Regular British Divisions, London: HM Stationery Office, 1934/Uckfield: Naval & Military Press, 2007, ISBN 1-847347-38-X.
- Maj A.F. Becke,History of the Great War: Order of Battle of Divisions, Part 2a: The Territorial Force Mounted Divisions and the 1st-Line Territorial Force Divisions (42–56), London: HM Stationery Office, 1935/Uckfield: Naval & Military Press, 2007, ISBN 1-847347-39-8.
- Maj A.F. Becke,History of the Great War: Order of Battle of Divisions, Part 2b: The 2nd-Line Territorial Force Divisions (57th–69th), with the Home-Service Divisions (71st–73rd) and 74th and 75th Divisions, London: HM Stationery Office, 1937/Uckfield: Naval & Military Press, 2007, ISBN 1-847347-39-8.
- Maj A.F. Becke,History of the Great War: Order of Battle of Divisions, Part 3b: New Army Divisions (30–41) and 63rd (R.N.) Division, London: HM Stationery Office, 1939/Uckfield: Naval & Military Press, 2007, ISBN 1-847347-41-X.
- Maj A.F. Becke,History of the Great War: Order of Battle of Divisions, Part 4: The Army Council, GHQs, Armies, and Corps 1914–1918, London: HM Stationery Office, 1944/Uckfield: Naval & Military Press, 2007, ISBN 1-847347-43-6.
- Ian F.W. Beckett, Riflemen Form: A Study of the Rifle Volunteer Movement 1859–1908, Aldershot: Ogilby Trusts, 1982, ISBN 0 85936 271 X.
- L.E. Buckell, The Surrey Yeomanry Cavalry, Journal of the Society for Army Historical Research, Vol 28, No 116 (Winter 1950), pp. 171–2.
- Burke's Peerage, Baronetage and Knightage, 100th Edn, London, 1953.
- C.R. Butt, 'Volunteer Force in Surrey, 1799–1813', Journal of the Society for Army Historical Research, Vol 40, No 164 (December 1962), pp. 207–3.
- Marquess of Cambridge, 'The Volunteer Army of Great Britain, 1806', Pt 2, Journal of the Society for Army Historical Research, Vol 31, No 128 (Winter 1953), pp. 163–74.
- Davis, Lt-Col T B (1980). The Surrey and Sussex Yeomanry in the Second World War (1st ed.). Ditchling: Ditchling Press. ISBN 095005843-2.
- Col John K. Dunlop, The Development of the British Army 1899–1914, London: Methuen, 1938.
- Brig-Gen Sir James E. Edmonds, History of the Great War: Military Operations, France and Belgium, 1914, Vol II, London: Macmillan, 1925/Imperial War Museum & Battery Press, 1995, ISBN 1-870423-55-0/Uckfield: Naval & Military Press, 2021, ISBN 978-1-78331-612-0.
- Brig-Gen Sir James E. Edmonds and Capt G.C. Wynne, History of the Great War: Military Operations, France and Belgium, 1915, Vol I, London: Macmillan, 1927/Imperial War Museum & Battery Press, 1995, ISBN 1-870423-87-9/Uckfield: Naval & Military Press, 2009, ISBN 978-1-84574-718-3.
- Maj L.F. Ellis, History of the Second World War, United Kingdom Military Series: The War in France and Flanders 1939–1940, London: HM Stationery Office, 1954/Uckfield: Naval & Military, 2004, 978-1-85457-056-6.
- Capt Cyril Falls, History of the Great War: Military Operations, Macedonia, Vol I, From the Outbreak of War until the Spring of 1917, London: Macmillan, 1933/London: Imperial War Museum & Battery Press, 1996, ISBN 0-89839-242-X/Uckfield: Naval and Military Press, 2011, ISBN 978-1-84574-944-6.
- Capt Cyril Falls, History of the Great War: Military Operations, Macedonia, Vol II, From the Spring of 1917 to the End of the War, London: Macmillan, 1935/London: Imperial War Museum & Battery Press, 1996, ISBN 0-89839-243-8/Uckfield: Naval and Military Press, 2011, ISBN 978-1-84574-943-9.
- Gen Sir Martin Farndale, History of the Royal Regiment of Artillery: The Years of Defeat: Europe and North Africa, 1939–1941, Woolwich: Royal Artillery Institution, 1988/London: Brasseys, 1996, ISBN 1-85753-080-2.
- J.B.M. Frederick, Lineage Book of British Land Forces 1660–1978, Vol I, Wakefield: Microform Academic, 1984, ISBN 1-85117-007-3.
- J.B.M. Frederick, Lineage Book of British Land Forces 1660–1978, Vol II, Wakefield: Microform Academic, 1984, ISBN 1-85117-009-X.
- Philip J. Haythornthwaite, 'The Volunteer Force, 1803–04' Journal of the Society for Army Historical Research, Vol 64, No 260 (Winter 1986), pp. 193–204.
- Brig E.A. James, British Regiments 1914–18, London: Samson Books, 1978, ISBN 0-906304-03-2/Uckfield: Naval & Military Press, 2001, ISBN 978-1-84342-197-9.
- Lt-Col H.F. Joslen, Orders of Battle, United Kingdom and Colonial Formations and Units in the Second World War, 1939–1945, London: HM Stationery Office, 1960/London: London Stamp Exchange, 1990, ISBN 0-948130-03-2/ Uckfield: Naval & Military Press, 2003, ISBN 1-843424-74-6.
- Norman E.H. Litchfield, The Territorial Artillery 1908–1988 (Their Lineage, Uniforms and Badges), Nottingham: Sherwood Press, 1992, ISBN 0-9508205-2-0.
- Paul McCue, Wandsworth and Battersea Battalions in the Great War, 1915–1918, Barnsley: Pen & Sword, 2010, ISBN 978-1-84884194-9.
- Mileham, Patrick (1994). The Yeomanry Regiments; 200 Years of Tradition. Edinburgh: Canongate Academic. ISBN 1-898410-36-4.
- Brig C.J.C. Molony,History of the Second World War, United Kingdom Military Series: The Mediterranean and Middle East, Vol V: The Campaign in Sicily 1943 and the Campaign in Italy 3rd September 1943 to 31st March 1944, London: HMSO, 1973/Uckfield, Naval & Military Press, 2004, ISBN 1-845740-69-6.
- Brig C.J.C. Molony, History of the Second World War, United Kingdom Military Series: The Mediterranean and Middle East, Vol VI: Victory in the Mediterranean, Part I: 1st April to 4th June 1944, London: HMSO, 1987/Uckfield, Naval & Military Press, 2004, ISBN 1-845740-70-X.
- Orgill, Douglas (1967). The Gothic Line (The Autumn Campaign in Italy 1944). London: Heinemann.
- Maj-Gen I.S.O. Playfair & Brig C.J.C. Molony, History of the Second World War, United Kingdom Military Series: The Mediterranean and Middle East, Vol IV: The Destruction of the Axis forces in Africa, London: HMSO, 1966/Uckfield, Naval & Military Press, 2004, ISBN 1-845740-68-8
- Rinaldi, Richard A (2008). Order of Battle of the British Army 1914. Ravi Rikhye. ISBN 978-0-97760728-0.
- Return ... of All Volunteer and Yeomanry Corps Whose Services Have Been Accepted by His Majesty..., House of Commons Paper 9 December 1803.
- Returns ... of the Volunteer Corps of Cavalry, Infantry, and Artillery, in Great Britain, House of Commons Paper 26 March 1806.
- Return of the different Corps of Yeomanry and Volunteers now serving in the different Counties of Great Britain, House of Commons Paper 6 March 1812.
- Col H.C.B. Rogers, The Mounted Troops of the British Army 1066–1945, London: Seeley Service, 1959.
- Edward M. Spiers, The Army and Society 1815–1914, London: Longmans, 1980, ISBN 0-582-48565-7.
- Titles and Designations of Formations and Units of the Territorial Army, London: War Office, 7 November 1927 (RA sections also summarised in Litchfield, Appendix IV).
- Alan Wakefield and Simon Moody, Under the Devil's Eye: Britain's Forgotten Army at Salonika 1915–1918, Stroud: Sutton, 2004, ISBN 0-7509-3537-5.

=== External links ===
- Chris Baker, The Long, Long Trail
- Derek Barton, Royal Artillery 1939–45
- Mark Conrad, The British Army, 1914 (archive site)
- The Drill Hall Project
- Great War Centenary Drill Halls
- T.F. Mills, Land Forces of Britain, the Empire and Commonwealth – Regiments.org (archive site)
- Stepping Forward: A Tribute to the Volunteer Military Reservists and Supporting Auxiliaries of Greater London
