= Kings Avenue drill hall, Clapham =

Military building in Clapham, London, England

Kings Avenue drill hall
- Clapham
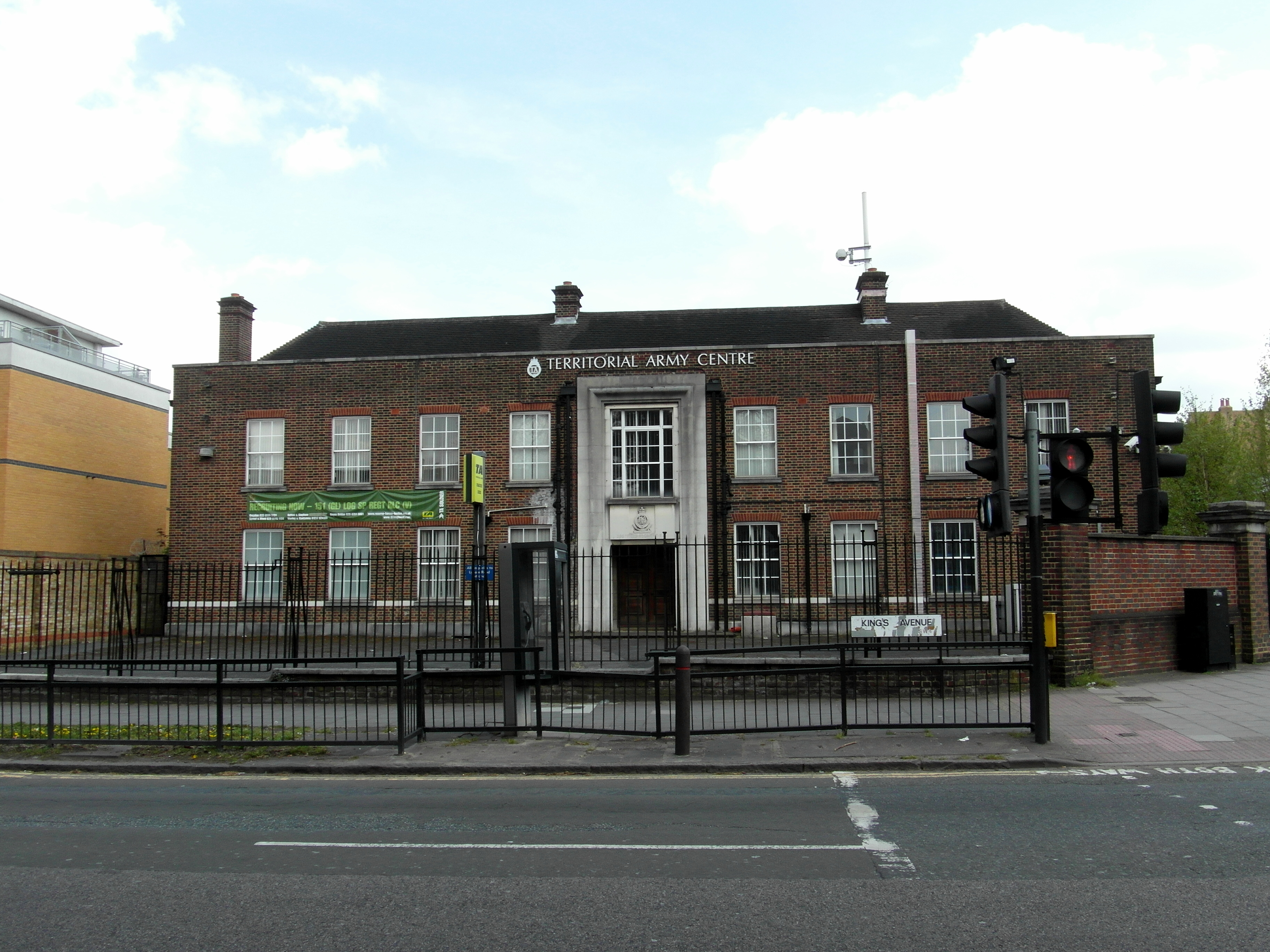
- Kings Avenue drill hall

Site information
- Type: Drill hall

Location
- Location within Greater London
- Coordinates: 51.4556°N 0.1292°W

Site history
- Built: Early 20th century
- Built for: War Office
- In use: Early 20th century - 2020

The Kings Avenue drill hall, often referred to as Melbourne House, was a military establishment in Clapham.

== History ==
The building was designed as the headquarters of the Surrey Yeomanry and was completed in the early 20th century. The regiment was mobilised at the drill hall in August 1914 before being deployed to Salonika.

The regiment evolved to become the 98th (Surrey and Sussex Yeomanry, Queen Mary's) Army Field Regiment, Royal Artillery in 1922, 298 Field Regiment, Royal Artillery in 1947 and 263 (Surrey Yeomanry, Queen's Mary's) Field Regiment, Royal Artillery in 1961. The unit was disbanded in 1967 but was reformed as B (Surrey Yeomanry) Troop, 200 (Sussex Yeomanry) Field Battery, 100 Medium Regiment RA (Volunteers) when it moved to Sutton in 1969.

Instead the drill hall became the base for a detachment from 210 Ambulance Squadron, 151 (Greater London) Transport Regiment, Royal Corps of Transport. The detachment was subsequently transferred to 240 Transport Squadron, 151 Regiment, Royal Logistic Corps. After the drill hall had been decommissioned, it was used as a filming venue.

The drill hall was demolished in April 2020 to make way for Harris Clapham Sixth Form College which is due to open in September 2021.
