= 101 (City of London) Engineer Regiment =

101 (City of London) Engineer Regiment (Explosive Ordnance Disposal & Search) is a regiment of the British Army's Royal Engineers. Under Army 2020 Refine, the regiment moved from a hybrid regiment to a reserve EOD&S regiment with the regimental headquarters established in Catford. It is part of 29th (Explosive Ordnance Disposal and Search) Group, 8 Engineer Brigade. The Honorary Colonel of the regiment is Col Jools Holland.

The regiment draws heritage from 1 Middlesex Engineer Volunteers formed by Norman MacLeod at the South Kensington Museum in January 1860. It became part of 56th (London) Armoured Division.

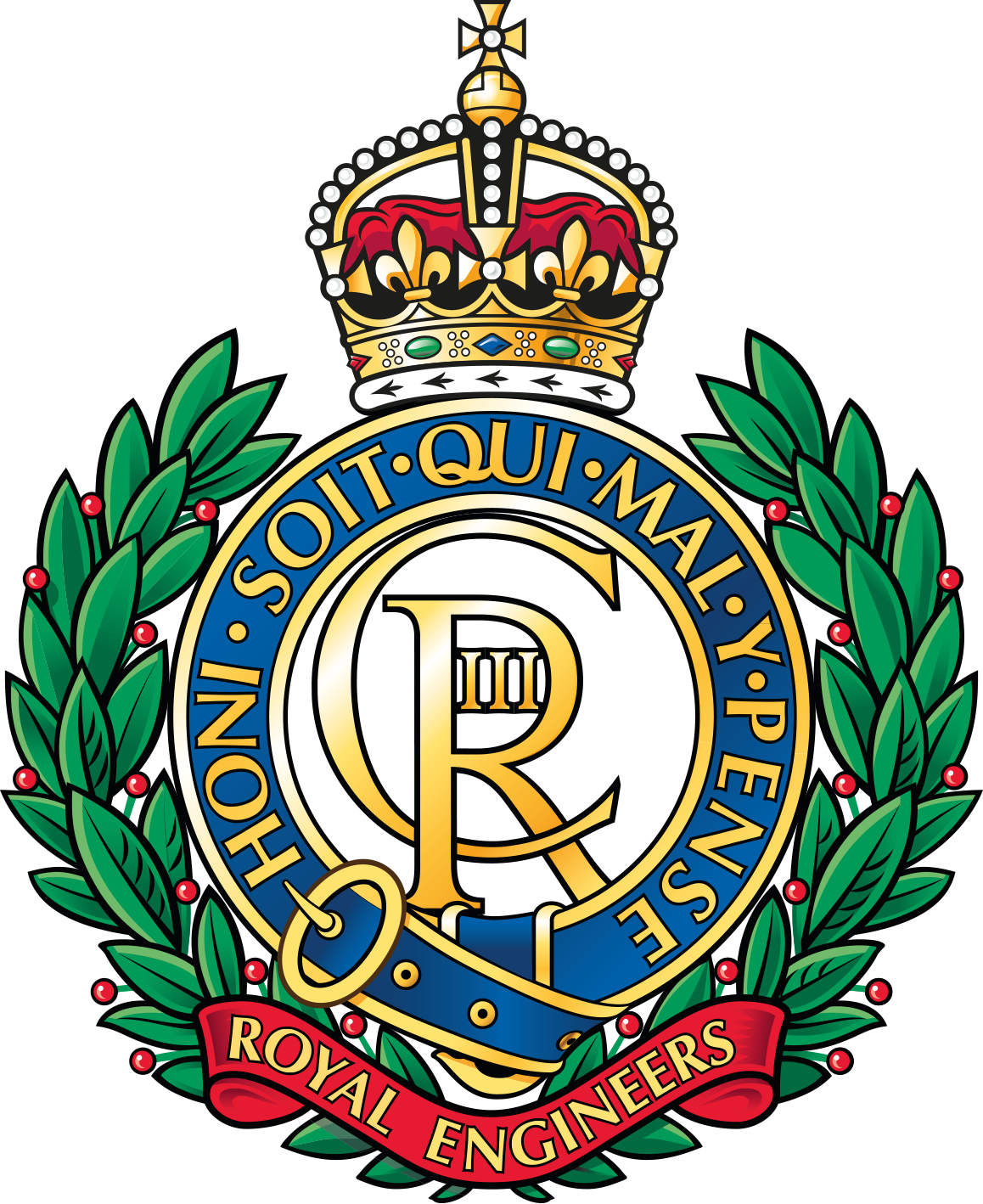
Corps of Royal Engineers' insignia

== Origins ==
Following a war office instruction in 1859 authorising Lord Lieutenants of Counties to raise volunteer corps to be used in case of invasion. They were to be self-funded and by 1860 had a total membership of 119,146 despite subscription costs and uniform costs between £3 and £6. As part of this movement Norman MacLeod offered two companies of engineers formed from engineering and allied professions at the South Kensington Museum to form the nucleus of a new Engineer Battalion named the 1st Middlesex Volunteer Engineers. In 1907 Yeomanry and Volunteers became Territorial Army and in 1908 1st Middlesex Volunteer Engineers became the engineers of 2nd London Division. At the start of the Second World War the name was changed to 1st London Division Engineers, which evolved to 101 Engineer Regiment (Volunteers) in 1960.

It was disbanded on 1 April 1967.

A new regimental headquarters grouping four (preexisting) EOD squadrons was formed on 1 June 1988, using the old 101 designation. 2010 saw the hybridisation of the regiment to regular and reserve, and on 28 July 2018 the regiment reverted to its original reserve status with the headquarters moving from Carver Barracks to Hudson House.

The Regiment has retained an unbroken link with the London Divisions (47th, 56th, 58th, and 60th) over nearly 60 years which included both World Wars. Elements of the Regiment have been actively involved in securing the City of London from the threat of unexploded ordnance since The Blitz, which included direct support to Operation Olympics, providing military forces to assist with the Security for the 2012 Summer Olympics in London. Operation Olympics was the longest and largest military security operation in the mainland United Kingdom since World War II.

In April 2000 the then Lord Mayor of the City of London, Alderman Clive Martin, granted “City of London” status to the Regiment in recognition of its long and distinguished association with the corporation; the Regiment retains close affiliations even today with the Curriers, Patternmakers, Fan Makers, Lightmongers and Constructors. In its 150-year history the Regiment has undergone no less than thirteen changes of name, however, ‘London’ has been the one constant for the past 102 years.

== Current organisation ==
The regiment's current organisation is as follows:

- Regimental Headquarters and Headquarters Troop, at Hudson House, Catford
- 217 (London) Field Squadron (EOD&S), in Ilford
  - 3 Troop, in Southend-on-Sea
- 221 Field Squadron (EOD&S), at Hudson House, Catford
  - 1 Troop, in Bexleyheath
  - 2 Troop, in Catford

- 579 Field Squadron (EOD&S), in Royal Tunbridge Wells
  - 1 (Sussex Yeomanry) Troop 1 (Sussex Yeomanry) Field Troop
  - 2 (Surrey Yeomanry) Field Troop, in Redhill
  - 3 Troop, in Rochester

== Campaigns ==
101 Engineer Regiment (EOD&S) can trace back service in the following campaigns:

- The British Conquest of Egypt 1882
- The second Boer War
- World War I
- World War II
- Operation ALLIED FORCE under NATO in Kosovo
- Operation DELIBERATE FORCE under NATO in Bosnia
- Operation TELIC in Iraq
- Operation HERRICK in Afghanistan
- Operation SHADER in Iraq

Operation Tosca in Cyprus

== Honours and awards ==
The distinguished history of the regiment is reflected in the presentation of a total of 209 honours and awards. These consist of:

- 12 Distinguished Service Orders
- 48 Military Crosses
- 27 Distinguished Conduct Medals
- 2 George Crosses
- 118 Military Medals
- 1 Queen's Gallantry Medal (Iraq - 2004)
- 1 King‘s Gallantry Medal(London - 2025)
