= Keru =

Keru كرو
- Location in Eritrea
- Coordinates: 15°35′0″N 37°15′0″E
- Country: Eritrea
- Region: Gash-Barka

Keru (Arabic: كرو) is a city in Eritrea.
