= RWY (disambiguation) =

RWY stands for runway.

RWY may also refer to:

- Royal Wiltshire Yeomanry, a former regiment and current squadron of the British Army Reserve
- Royal Wessex Yeomanry, a regiment of the British Army Reserve

== See also ==
- Raceway (disambiguation)
- Railway (disambiguation)
- Roll way, on a tramway
