= The Royal Yeomanry Review =

A Royal Review of Serving Yeomanry Regiments & Yeomanry Old Comrades by Her Majesty The Queen on the Occasion of the 200th Anniversary of the formation of the Yeomanry at Poets Lawn, Windsor Great Park on Sunday 17 April 1994.

== Inspection party ==
HER MAJESTY THE QUEEN
Colonel Commandant of the Yeomanry - Colonel Sir Ralph Carr-Ellison TD
Ceremonial Mounted Escort Commander - Captain W D Peck (The Royal Wessex Yeomanry)
Parade Adjutant - Lt.Col. J R Arkell TD (The Royal Yeomanry)
Parade Corporal Major - W01 D P Evans (The Life Guards) RCM (The Royal Yeomanry)
Parade Chaplain - The Reverend Alan Hughes CF TD
Director of Music - Major R J Parker FTCL ARCM (The Royal Yeomanry)

== Yeomanry Titles On Parade ==
Yeomanry	ORBAT
Royal Wiltshire Yeomanry	A Sqn Royal Yeomanry
Leicestershire and Derbyshire Yeomanry	B Sqn Royal Yeomanry
Kent and Sharpshooters Yeomanry	C Sqn Royal Yeomanry
Inns of Court & City Yeomanry	Band Royal Yeomanry
Westminster Dragoons	W Sqn Royal Yeomanry
Royal Wiltshire Yeomanry	B Sqn Royal Wessex Yeomanry
Royal Gloucestershire Hussars	A Sqn Royal Wessex Yeomanry
Royal Gloucestershire Hussars	HQ Sqn Royal Wessex Yeomanry
Royal Gloucestershire Hussars	Band Royal Wessex Yeomanry
Royal Devon Yeomanry	D Sqn Royal Wessex Yeomanry
Queen's Own Warwickshire and Worcestershire Yeomanry	A Sqn Royal Mercian & Lancastrian Yeomanry
Queen's Own Royal Staffordshire	B Sqn Royal Mercian & Lancastrian Yeomanry
Shropshire Yeomanry	HQ Sqn Royal Mercian & Lancastrian Yeomanry
Duke of Lancaster's Own Yeomanry	D Sqn Royal Mercian & Lancastrian Yeomanry
Queen's Own Yorkshire Dragoons	Y Sqn Queen's Own Yeomanry
Sherwood Rangers Yeomanry	B Sqn Queen's Own Yeomanry
Cheshire Yeomanry	C Sqn Queen's Own Yeomanry
Northumberland Hussars	D Sqn Queen's Own Yeomanry
Northumberland Hussars	HQ Sqn Queen's Own Yeomanry
Ayrshire (Earl of Carrick's Own) Yeomanry	A Sqn Scottish Yeomanry
Lanarkshire & Glasgow Yeomanry	B Sqn Scottish Yeomanry
Lothians and Border Horse	HQ Sqn Scottish Yeomanry
Fife and Forfar Yeomanry/Scottish Horse	C Sqn Scottish Yeomanry
North Irish Horse	Disbanded 1999
Bedfordshire Yeomanry	201 (Hertfordshire & Bedfordshire Yeomanry) Bty RA, 100 (Yeomanry) Fd Regt RA
Hertfordshire Yeomanry	201 (Hertfordshire & Bedfordshire Yeomanry) Bty RA, 100 (Yeomanry) Fd Regt RA
Duke of Yorks Own Loyal Suffolk Hussars	202 (Suffolk & Norfolk Yeomanry) Bty RA, 100 (Yeomanry) Fd Regt RA
King's Own Royal Norfolk Yeomanry	202 (Suffolk & Norfolk Yeomanry) Bty RA, 100 (Yeomanry) Fd Regt RA
Glamorgan Yeomanry	C (Glamorgan Yeomanry) Troop, 211 (South Wales) Bty RA, 104 Regt RA (V)
Sussex Yeomanry	127 (Sussex Yeomanry) Fd Sqn RE, 78 Fortress Engr Regt RE (V)
Hampshire Yeomanry	227 (Hampshire Yeomanry) Amphibious Engr Sqn RE, 78 Fortress Engr Regt RE (V)
Duke of Cambridge's Own Middlesex Yeomanry	47 (Middlesex Yeomanry) Sig Sqn(V), 31 Sig Regt (V)
Duke of Cambridge's Own Middlesex Yeomanry	Band (Middlesex Yeomanry) Sig Sqn(V), 31 Sig Regt (V)
Cheshire Yeomanry	80 (Cheshire Yeomanry) Sig Sqn(V), 33 Sig Regt (V)
Shropshire Yeomanry	95 (Shropshire Yeomanry) Sig Sqn(V), 35 (South Midland) Sig Regt (V)
Queen's Own Warwickshire and Worcestershire Yeomanry	67 (Queen's Own Warwickshire & Worcestershire Yeomanry) Sig Sqn(V), 37 Sig Regt (V)
Essex Yeomanry	70 (Essex Yeomanry) Sig Sqn(V), 38 Sig Regt (V)
Essex Yeomanry	Band (Essex Yeomanry) Sig Sqn(V), 38 Sig Regt (V)
Queen's Own Oxfordshire Hussars	5 (Queen's Own Oxfordshire Hussars)Squadron (V), 39 (City of London) Sig Regt (V)
Inns of Court & City Yeomanry	68 Sig Sqn (V), 71 (Yeomanry) Sig Regt (V)
Berkshire Yeomanry	94 Sig Sqn (V), 71 (Yeomanry) Sig Regt (V)
Kent and County of London Yeomanry	265 Sigs Sqn, 71 (Yeomanry) Sig Regt (V)
Kent & County of London Yeomanry	HQ Sigs Sqn, 71 (Yeomanry) Sig Regt (V)
Surrey Yeomanry	A (Salerno) Coy, 6th/7th Bn Princess of Wales's Royal Regt
Lovat Scouts	A (Queen's Own Highlanders and Lovat Scouts) Coy, 2nd Bn 51st Highland Volunteers
Pembroke Yeomanry	224 Sqn (Engr Sp), 157 (Wales & Midlands) Tpt Regt RLC (V)
First Aid Nursing Yeomanry	Woman's Transport Service FANY
