= Yeomanry order of precedence =

Precedence is the order in which the various corps of the British Army parade, from right to left, with the unit at the extreme right being highest.

== Precedence ==
The British Army has frequently been the subject of amalgamation and re-organisation throughout its history. The general rule for establishing the order of precedence is the date of creation of the regiment and its subsequent unbroken service. Disbanded regiments automatically lost precedence. Since 1994 two orders of precedence used parochially and unofficially within the Yeomanry; the Army List of 1914 and the Order of Yeomanry Titles on parade at The Royal Yeomanry Review. Irrespective of this, official precedence within the Army is set out in King's Regulations.

== Order of precedence from the Army List of 1914 ==
The first is a list of yeomanry units on the establishment at the outbreak of the First World War and therefore contains units that had been disbanded by the time of The Royal Yeomanry Review. This first list does not contain the North Irish, South Irish or King Edward's Horse who were on the Special Reserve at this time. The First Aid Nursing Yeomanry do not appear as they are not part of the British Army or its reserve.

1. Royal Wiltshire Yeomanry
2. Warwickshire Yeomanry
3. Yorkshire Hussars
4. Nottinghamshire (Sherwood Rangers)
5. Staffordshire Yeomanry
6. Shropshire Yeomanry
7. Ayrshire (Earl of Carrick's Own) Yeomanry
8. Cheshire Yeomanry
9. Queen's Own Yorkshire Dragoons
10. Leicestershire Yeomanry
11. North Somerset Yeomanry
12. Duke of Lancaster's Own Yeomanry
13. Lanarkshire Yeomanry
14. Northumberland Hussars
15. South Nottinghamshire Hussars
16. Denbighshire Hussars
17. Westmorland and Cumberland Yeomanry
18. Pembroke Yeomanry
19. Royal East Kent Yeomanry
20. Hampshire Yeomanry
21. Royal Buckinghamshire Yeomanry
22. Derbyshire Yeomanry
23. Queen's Own Dorset Yeomanry
24. Royal Gloucestershire Hussars
25. Hertfordshire Yeomanry
26. Berkshire Yeomanry
27. 1st County of London (Middlesex Hussars)
28. Royal 1st Devon Yeomanry
29. Suffolk Yeomanry (Duke of York's Own Loyal Suffolk Hussars)
30. Royal North Devon Yeomanry
31. Queen's Own Worcestershire Hussars
32. Queen's Own West Kent Yeomanry
33. West Somerset Yeomanry
34. Queen's Own Oxfordshire Hussars
35. Montgomeryshire Yeomanry
36. Lothians and Border Horse
37. Queen's Own Royal Glasgow Yeomanry
38. Lancashire Hussars
39. Surrey Yeomanry
40. Fife and Forfar Yeomanry
41. Norfolk Yeomanry
42. Sussex Yeomanry
43. Glamorgan Yeomanry
44. Welsh Horse
45. Lincolnshire Yeomanry
46. City of London (Rough Riders)
47. 2nd County of London (Westminster Dragoons)
48. 3rd County of London Yeomanry (Sharpshooters)
49. Bedfordshire Yeomanry
50. Essex Yeomanry
51. Northamptonshire Yeomanry
52. East Riding of Yorkshire Yeomanry
53. 1st Lovat's Scouts (sic)
54. 2nd Lovat's Scouts (sic)
55. Scottish Horse

== Order of Yeomanry titles on parade ==
The second order of precedence represents units that were on the establishment of the Territorial Army at the time of the review. Order of precedence in this instance includes the current role of the unit, placing Armoured Corps before Artillery and so on. Since the review, several units and sub-units have changed role and corps or been disbanded.

The approach taken at The Royal Yeomanry Review can be summarised as follows:

- Units are ordered in accordance with British Army Order of Precedence
- Sub-Units are ordered in accordance with the Army List of 1914, as amended by any subsequent disbandments, amalgamations etc.

The following is taken from the last page of the programme printed for The Royal Yeomanry Review. As on that day, the list below has been divided into blocks corresponding to the order in which the units formed and grouped.

- The Royal Yeomanry

Royal Wiltshire Yeomanry
Leicestershire and Derbyshire Yeomanry (PAO)
Kent and Sharpshooters Yeomanry
Inns of Court & City Yeomanry
Westminster Dragoons

- The Royal Wessex Yeomanry

Queen's Own Dorset Yeomanry
Royal Wiltshire Yeomanry
Royal Gloucestershire Hussars
Royal Devon Yeomanry

- The Royal Mercian and Lancastrian Yeomanry

Queen's Own Warwickshire and Worcestershire Yeomanry
Queen's Own Staffordshire Yeomanry
Shropshire Yeomanry
Duke of Lancaster's Own Yeomanry

- The Queen's Own Yeomanry

Queen's Own Yorkshire Yeomanry
Sherwood Rangers Yeomanry
Cheshire Yeomanry
Northumberland Hussars

- The Scottish Yeomanry

Earl of Carrick's Own Ayrshire Yeomanry
Queen's Own Royal Glasgow Yeomanry
Lothians and Border Horse
Fife and Forfar Yeomanry/Scottish Horse

- North Irish Horse
- Bedfordshire Yeomanry
- Hertfordshire Yeomanry
- Suffolk Yeomanry (Duke of York's Own Loyal Suffolk Hussars)
- King's Own Royal Norfolk Yeomanry
- Glamorgan Yeomanry
- Sussex Yeomanry
- Hampshire Yeomanry
- Duke of Cambridge's Own Middlesex Yeomanry
- Cheshire Yeomanry
- Shropshire Yeomanry
- Queen's Own Warwickshire and Worcestershire Yeomanry
- Essex Yeomanry
- Queen's Own Oxfordshire Hussars
- Inns of Court & City Yeomanry
- Berkshire Yeomanry
- Kent and County of London Yeomanry
- Surrey Yeomanry
- Lovat Scouts
- Pembrokeshire (Castlemartin) Yeomanry
- First Aid Nursing Yeomanry (not an army unit)

== See also ==
- British Army Order of Precedence
- Yeomanry
- Second line yeomanry regiments of the British Army

== Notes ==
1. Units on the Special Reserve take precedence after a Regular Unit and before a Yeomanry Unit.
2. The Welsh Horse was only raised after the outbreak of war in 1914. It was accorded precedence after its parent, the Glamorgan Yeomanry.
3. The Scottish Horse was two regiments strong in peacetime, with a third regiment formed in August 1914.
4. A Sqn Royal Yeomanry
5. Band of the Royal Yeomanry
6. B Sqn Royal Wessex Yeomanry
7. A and HQ Sqns Royal Wessex Yeomanry
8. A Sqn Royal Mercian and Lancastrian Yeomanry
9. HQ Sqn Royal Mercian and Lancastrian Yeomanry
10. C Sqn Queen's Own Yeomanry
11. 80 Sig Sqn (V), 33 Sig Regt (V)
12. 95 Sig Sqn (V), 35 Sig Regt (V)
13. 67 Sig Sqn (V), 37 Sig Regt (V)
14. 68 Sig Sqn (V), 71 Sig Regt (V)

== Bibliography ==
- James, Brigadier E.A. (1978). British Regiments 1914–18. London: Samson Books Limited. ISBN 0-906304-03-2.
- Mileham, Patrick (1994). The Yeomanry Regiments; 200 Years of Tradition. Edinburgh: Canongate Academic. ISBN 1-898410-36-4.
- Royal Review of Serving Yeomanry Regiments & Old Comrades by Her Majesty The Queen. 1994.
