= Raceway =

Raceway may refer to:

== Sporting venues ==
- Raceway, a race track, where sporting races are run or operated, such as:
  - Roosevelt Raceway, a former race track in Westbury, New York
  - Yonkers Raceway, a racino in Yonkers, New York

== Arts, entertainment, and media ==
- "Raceway, a song by Def Leppard on Kings of Oblivion (1973)
- "Raceway", a song by the Pink Fairies

== Other uses ==
- Raceway (aquaculture), a tank providing a flow-through system to support a higher density of animals for seafood
- Raceway, surface mounted wire moulding in construction projects
- Raceway, a mill race; the current or channel of a stream
- Raceway, a brand of gasoline stations operated by RaceTrac contractors in the Southeastern United States

== See also ==
- Raceway Park (disambiguation)
- Speedway (disambiguation)
