= Royal Gloucestershire Hussars =

Unit of the British Army

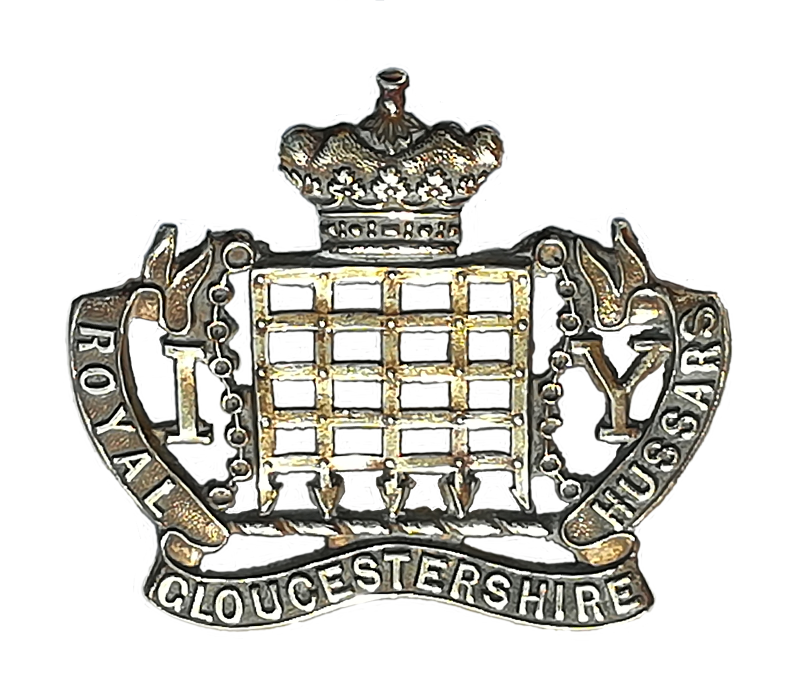
- Royal Gloucestershire Hussars cap badge from the period of the Imperial Yeomanry
- Active: 1830–present
- Country: United Kingdom
- Branch: British Army
- Type: Royal Armoured Corps
- Role: Armoured cavalry
- Part of: Royal Wessex Yeomanry
- March: Quick: D'ye ken John Peel?
- Engagements: Second Boer War; First World War: Gallipoli 1915; Egypt 1915–17; Palestine 1917–18; Second World War: North Africa 1941–42

Commanders
- Honorary Colonel: Lt Col The Lord De Mauley, TD
- Notable commanders: Henry Somerset, 7th Duke of Beaufort Henry Somerset, 8th Duke of Beaufort; Francis Berkeley, 2nd Baron FitzHardinge; Henry Somerset, 9th Duke of Beaufort Henry Somerset, 10th Duke of Beaufort

The Royal Gloucestershire Hussars was a volunteer yeomanry regiment which, in the 20th century, became part of the British Army Reserve. It traced its origins to the First or Cheltenham Troop of Gloucestershire Gentleman and Yeomanry raised in 1795, although a break in the lineage means that its formation is dated to the Marshfield and Dodington Troop raised in 1830. Six further troops – officered by nobility and gentry, and recruited largely from among landholders and tenant farmers – were subsequently raised in Gloucestershire, and in 1834 they came together to form the Gloucestershire Yeomanry Cavalry. In 1847, the regiment adopted a hussar uniform and the name Royal Gloucestershire Hussars. Originally intended to counter insurrection and a French invasion that never materialised, the yeomanry's first deployments were ceremonial and as mounted police during times of civil unrest. Three Gloucestershire troops were deployed to Bristol on two separate occasions in the 1830s in support of the civil authorities.

From the mid-19th century, the yeomanry's policing role diminished with the establishment of a civilian police force, and renewed fears of invasion turned its focus to national defence. The Royal Gloucestershire Hussars' first battle honour was won in South Africa during the Second Boer War, when a contingent of Gloucestershire yeomanry served as mounted infantry in the Imperial Yeomanry. Before the First World War, all volunteer forces, including the yeomanry, were brought into the Territorial Force. On the outbreak of the war the regiment raised a second-line unit, which remained in the UK and became a cyclist unit in 1916, and a third-line unit, which served as a reserve. The first-line unit saw action as infantry at Gallipoli and as cavalry in the Sinai and Palestine Campaign; in the latter it fought both mounted and dismounted from the Suez Canal to Aleppo in modern-day Syria. Following the war, the regiment was downsized and converted to the 21st (Royal Gloucestershire Hussars) Armoured Car Company.

When the United Kingdom began mobilising again in the late 1930s, the company converted to an armoured regiment and was restored to its former name. On the outbreak of the Second World War, the Royal Gloucestershire Hussars once again raised second- and third-line units. The first-line regiment remained in the UK as a training unit, seeing service overseas only after the war as part of the army of occupation in Austria, and the third-line regiment was actually a troop-sized unit acting mainly as a deception designed to disguise British armour strength and disposition. The 2nd Royal Gloucestershire Hussars fought in North Africa, initially attached to the 7th Armoured Division (the Desert Rats). The regiment suffered heavy losses during Operation Crusader and the subsequent Battle of Gazala, twice being taken out of the line for refit, and was variously equipped with Crusader, M3 Stuart and M3 Grant tanks. When it lost two commanders killed in action in quick succession, the regiment's individual squadrons were used to reinforce other units, and the 2nd Royal Gloucestershire Hussars was disbanded in 1943. Reduced back to a single regiment after the war, the Royal Gloucestershire Hussars was equipped with armoured cars and given a reconnaissance role. Repeated reorganisation of the Territorial Army in the 1960s reduced the regiment to a squadron assigned to an infantry role. In the 1990s, the squadron returned to an armour role in the Royal Wessex Yeomanry, tasked with training replacement crews for the regular army's Challenger 2 tanks.

== Origins ==
In 1794, fearing insurrection and faced with the threat of invasion during the French Revolutionary Wars, British Prime Minister William Pitt made the first ever recorded mention of yeoman cavalry when he called for an augmentation of the cavalry for internal defence. The government subsequently proposed a plan to all Lord-Lieutenants – the monarch's personal representative in each county – to increase the forces at the nation's disposal. This included the raising of volunteer troops of cavalry consisting of gentlemen and yeomanry. Each troop comprised 50 to 80 men, commanded by the person raising it. Commanders received a temporary rank ranging from Captain to Colonel, depending on the number of troops raised. Officers were generally appointed from among the nobility and gentry, and troops were largely recruited from landholders and tenant farmers. Members provided their own horses and were not paid except when called out. Uniforms were provided by the commanders, and weapons by the government. The yeomanry could only be called out by the Lord-Lieutenant or royal warrant to suppress civil unrest in home or neighbouring counties, or by royal warrant in the event of foreign invasion. The individual troops of the Corps of Gentlemen and Yeomanry, as the force was first called, were initially independent, and only later would they combine to form regiments. Each troop was required to conduct exercises, or 'permanent duty', initially for twelve days each year, reduced to six in 1816.

The first yeomanry troop raised in Gloucestershire was the 60-strong First or Cheltenham Troop of Gloucestershire Gentlemen and Yeomanry, formed in 1795 by Powell Snell, a gentleman of means and good position. In total, eight troops had been raised by 1798. (Note: In addition to Cheltenham, troops were raised in the late 18th century at Minchinhampton, Wotton-Under-Edge, Stow-on-the-Wold (named the Cotswold Troop), Bristol, Henbury, Gloucester and Stroud (named the Longtree, Bisley, and Whitstone Troop)) Following the 1802 Peace of Amiens, all except the Cheltenham Troop were disbanded, but the following year Napoleon's planned invasion of the United Kingdom prompted the re-establishment of several old troops and the formation of new troops; by the end of 1803 there were thirteen troops in Gloucestershire, and in 1813 the county's yeomanry had a strength of 582 men. (Note: As well as the Cheltenham Troop, the following troops were raised in the early 19th century: Stow; Bristol (one dismounted and two mounted troops); Cirencester; Dursley; Gloucester; Grumbolds Ash (near Badminton); Longtree, Bisley, and Whitstone; Tewkesbury; Tortworth; and Winterbourne.) As well as permanent duty, the yeomanry assembled as required for ceremonial and peace-keeping purposes; the Gloucester Troop provided an escort during the visit of the Prince of Wales to the city in 1807, and in 1810 it was called out to an affray between Irish militia and citizens in a local pub. A general reduction in volunteer forces followed the defeat of Napoleon, and by 1815 all yeomanry troops in Gloucestershire except one were disbanded. Only the Gloucester Troop was retained, as a mounted police force, until it too was disbanded in 1827.

== Formation and early history ==
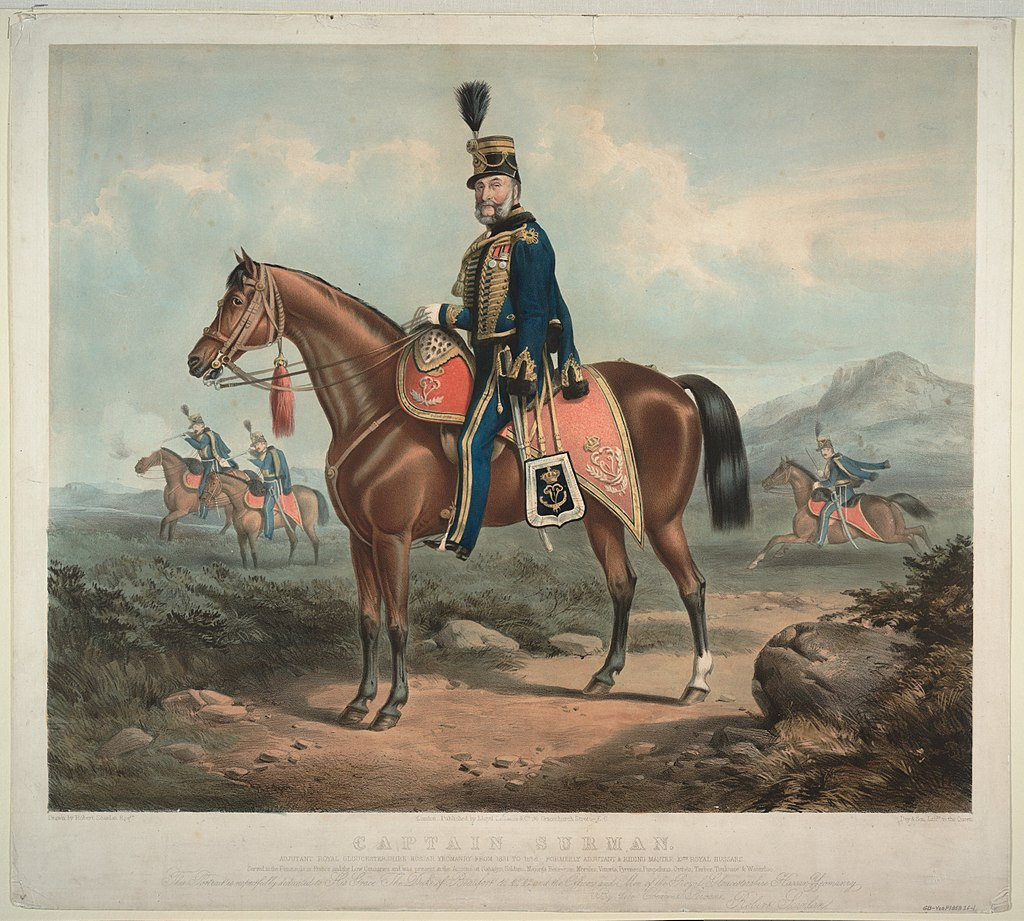
An officer of the Royal Gloucestershire Hussars 1834–1858

New troops of yeomanry were raised in the 1830s in response to the Swing Riots. The first such troop established in Gloucestershire was the Marshfield and Dodington Troop, raised in 1830 by William Codrington, from which the Royal Gloucestershire Hussars dated its formation. The troop comprised three officers, a quartermaster, four non-commissioned officers, a trumpeter and fifty troopers, and was recruited from the tenants of Codrington's estate and those of his neighbours, including that of the Duke of Beaufort. In 1831, six more troops were raised by members of the Gloucestershire gentry in Fairford and Cirencester, Stroudwater, Tetbury, Gloucester, Winterbourne and Stapleton, and Alveston. That same year, the Dodington and Tetbury Troops were sent to Bristol in response to civil unrest following the defeat of the Second Reform Bill in the House of Lords.

In 1834, all of the Gloucestershire yeomanry captains met in the hamlet of Petty France in south Gloucestershire and agreed to combine their troops into a single regiment, to be named the Gloucestershire Yeomanry Cavalry. Its first commanding officer was the Marquis of Worcester, who became the 7th Duke of Beaufort in 1835, thus beginning the regiment's long association with the Beaufort family. The new regiment was ranked 24th in the yeomanry order of precedence and comprised seven troops with a total strength of 26 officers and 382 other ranks. Adopting the uniform of light dragoons, each man was armed with sword and pistol, and twelve skirmishers in each troop were armed with muzzle-loading carbines. The regiment's first deployment came in 1838, when the Dodington and Winterbourne Troops helped police a Chartist rally in Bristol. The 'Royal' prefix was granted in 1841, and in 1847 the regiment adopted a blue hussar uniform and the name Royal Gloucestershire Hussars. The authority of the Duke of Beaufort is evident in his order, in 1846, that all members should grow moustaches "in the form of a carving knife", an instruction that was derided in the pages of Punch magazine at the time, and his insistence the next year that the regiment wear the second jacket over the back, Hungarian style, instead of the usual English-style over the shoulder.

The influence of the social order on the composition of the regiment at this time can be observed from an incident in 1847. It involved a disagreement between Lord FitzHardinge, Lord-Lieutenant of Gloucestershire, and his brother, Grantley Berkeley, a member of parliament and captain of the Berkeley Troop, which had joined the regiment in 1840. In pursuing his grievance against his brother, FitzHardinge pressured his tenants into resigning from the troop and threatened some with the loss of their farms if they did not. Further insight into the regiment's strong ties to the farming community can be found in the records of the annual exercises. In 1865, the permanent duty was deferred until the autumn due to an early harvest, and participation in a major 14-day exercise in 1871 was cancelled due to a late harvest. Attendance at the annual assemblies dropped below 300 men in the late 1870s and early 1880s, compared to 445 in 1875, due to a succession of bad harvests. In 1890, the regiment boasted four Masters of Hounds and a large number of fox hunters in its membership, both officers and other ranks, and that year it adopted an old hunting song, D'ye ken John Peel, as its regimental march.

The establishment of a civilian police force and renewed fears of invasion in the mid-19th century turned the yeomanry's focus to national defence. In 1871, breech-loading carbines from Westley Richards replaced the muzzle-loading carbines and were issued to all troopers rather than just the skirmishers, and three years later responsibility for the yeomanry was transferred from the Lord-Lieutenants to district military commanders of the War Office. In 1867, the regiment's annual inspection had involved drill, but from 1875 the regiment was practising outpost duties, reconnaissance, and rear-guard exercises in the local hills. As the years passed, old troops were disbanded, renamed or amalgamated and new troops raised, and in 1893 the troops then existing were formally organised by order of the army into squadrons:

- A Squadron – Gloucester and Berkeley Troops
- B Squadron – Cheltenham and Tewkesbury Troops
- C Squadron – Monmouth and Chepstow Troops
- D Squadron – Badminton and Dodington Troops

The order also allocated the yeomanry regiments to brigades and required them to train at brigade level every three years. Accordingly, the Royal Gloucestershire Hussars joined the Royal Wiltshire Yeomanry in the 3rd Yeomanry Brigade, and the two regiments conducted their first joint permanent duty in 1895.

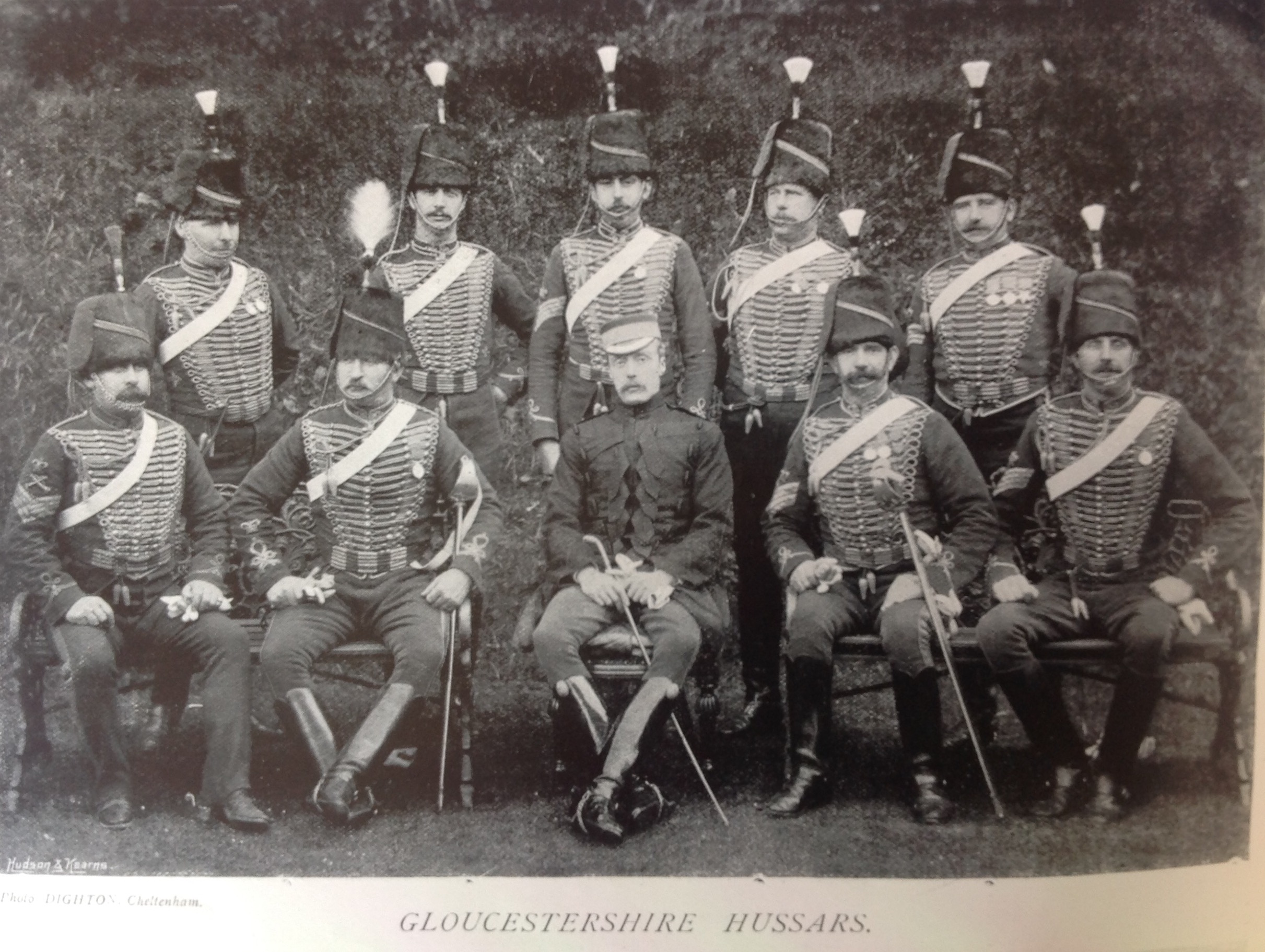
Sergeants of the Royal Gloucestershire Hussars 1896

In 1899, the British government created the Imperial Yeomanry to reinforce the regular army during the Second Boer War, and the existing Yeomanry Cavalry regiments were asked to provide volunteers. The Royal Gloucestershire Hussars contributed a contingent of 125 men, around half of whom were existing members, the remainder being recruited into the regiment when they enlisted for service in South Africa. They were folded into the Imperial Yeomanry as 3rd Company, 1st Battalion, which arrived in South Africa in 1900 and saw its first action on 5 May at Thaba 'Nchu. It served for 18 months, as mounted rifles rather than cavalry, and came under fire 65 times, though more men were lost to sickness than enemy action. On their return to the UK in July 1901, the men of the 1st Battalion were absorbed back into their parent regiments, and the veterans of the Royal Gloucestershire Hussars endowed the regiment with its first battle honour, "South Africa 1900–01".

In April 1901, the domestic Yeomanry Cavalry was renamed to the Imperial Yeomanry. The reorganisation set an established regimental strength of 593 (later reduced to 476) all ranks – organised as before into four squadrons, but with the addition of a machine-gun section – replaced carbines and swords with Lee–Enfield rifles and bayonets, and introduced a standard khaki uniform. The Imperial Yeomanry's mounted rifles role in South Africa and the reorganisation, along with the new uniforms and equipment, led to fears that the yeomanry was being relegated from cavalry to infantry. The regiment petitioned the King for permission to retain the sword on parade, and by 1913 the weapon had been re-introduced in place of the bayonet for general use. The Imperial Yeomanry as an organisation lasted only until 1908, when the Territorial and Reserve Forces Act 1907 came into effect and brought all volunteer forces, including the yeomanry, together into the Territorial Force. The Royal Gloucestershire Hussars conducted its first annual training under the new scheme between 19 May and 2 June 1909, when the 1st South Midland Mounted Brigade, of which the regiment was now part, assembled with the 1st South Western Mounted Brigade for exercises in the Salisbury Plain Training Area.

== First World War ==
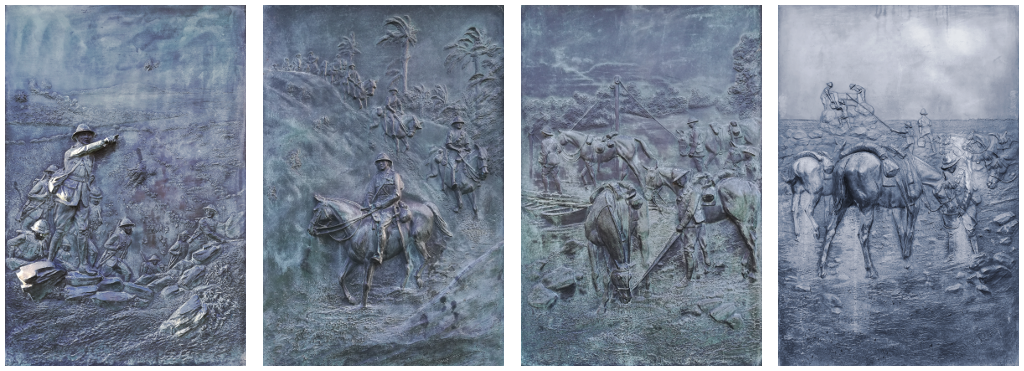
Panels from the Royal Gloucestershire Hussars war memorial at Gloucester Cathedral representing, from left to right, Gallipoli 1915, Sinai 1916, Palestine 1917 and Syria 1918.

Following the outbreak of the First World War, the regiment mobilised on 4 August 1914 and joined the rest of the 1st South Midland Mounted Brigade at Warwick eight days later. By the end of the month, the brigade had assembled on the Berkshire Downs with the rest of the 2nd Mounted Division, which was subsequently stationed on home defence duties on the east coast of England. As a territorial regiment, the Royal Gloucestershire Hussars was not obliged to serve overseas but could volunteer to do so, and when it did, a second-line regiment was formed in September 1914 to take its place on home defence duties. A third regiment was raised in 1915 as a reserve and to provide replacements for the first two. The regiments were numbered the 1/1st, 2/1st and 3/1st Royal Gloucestershire Hussars. (Note: The terms of the Territorial Force precluded service overseas, but individuals had the option to accept the Imperial Service Obligation and serve in foreign campaigns. On the outbreak of the First World War, units in which 80% or more of the men accepted the obligation became available for overseas duties. The unit's place on home defence duties was then taken by second-line units recruited from those individuals from the original unit who did not accept the obligation.)

The second-line regiment spent most of the war stationed at various locations in England, initially as part of the 2/1st South Midland Mounted Brigade (subsequently renamed the 10th Mounted Brigade) in the 2/2nd Mounted Division (subsequently renamed the 3rd Mounted Division). In July 1916, the regiment swapped horses for bicycles and joined the 8th Cyclist Brigade in the 2nd Cyclist Division. In November, the regiment was merged with the 2/1st Queen's Own Worcestershire Hussars to form the 12th (Gloucestershire and Worcestershire) Yeomanry Cyclist Regiment in the 4th Cyclist Brigade, but resumed its original identity as the 2/1st Royal Gloucestershire Hussars in March 1917. Around April 1918, the regiment moved to Ireland and was stationed at Dublin, where it remained, still in the 4th Cyclist Brigade, until the end of the war. The third-line regiment became part of the Cavalry Reserve at Tidworth, initially affiliated to the 4th Reserve Cavalry Regiment and subsequently to the 5th Reserve Cavalry Regiment.

=== Gallipoli ===
In April 1915, the 2nd Mounted Division sailed to Egypt, and the 1/1st Royal Gloucestershire Hussars, less C Squadron, disembarked at Alexandria on 24 April. On 14 August, the regiment embarked without its horses for Gallipoli and arrived at Suvla Bay three days later. It fought as infantry at Chocolate Hill on 21 August, supporting the attack of the 29th Division in the Battle of Scimitar Hill, during which the regiment suffered 61 casualties. It remained in the area until the end of October, serving periods of duty in reserve and in the support and front-line trenches. During this time it continued to lose men to sickness and enemy shelling, and of the original contingent of 361 all ranks that had landed over two months previously, only some 100 men were still fit for duty when the regiment departed Gallipoli on 31 October.

=== Egypt ===
We have got quite a reputation. I tell you this because there are certain people in high places who can’t say anything too bad for us after the "disaster", which was bad management and nothing to do with us. So I don’t suppose we shall get much credit. It will be interesting to see. Our Anzac General is delighted with us and says all sorts of nice things, and told Ralph we saved the situation at Romani, where we were told to hold on at all costs till the infantry came up in the morning.

— Diary of Lieutenant Edgerton Cripps
Royal Gloucestershire Hussars
10 August 1916

After a short spell on Lemnos, the regiment arrived back in Egypt in November 1915. It returned to the cavalry role and was brought back up to strength, numbering 370 all ranks in January 1916. The same month, the 2nd Mounted Division was disbanded, and the 1st South Midland Mounted Brigade – renamed the 5th Mounted Brigade in April – became corps troops for the XV Corps, stationed in the Suez Canal area. In late March 1916, the regiment was patrolling the Sinai, and at the end of the month it assembled at Romani (modern day Rommana), some 21 miles (34 km) east of the canal.

Early on 23 April 1916, A Squadron was stationed at Qatia (or Katia), some 6 miles (10 km) south-east of Romani. At 09:15 it came under attack by a Turkish force of between 1,000 and 1,500 infantry, supported by cavalry and a battery of mountain guns, which had already overwhelmed two squadrons of the Queen's Own Worcestershire Hussars and a party of Royal Engineers further east at Oghratina. The squadron was reinforced by a squadron of Worcestershire Hussars, and the regiment's own B and D Squadrons moved out of Romani in support. The defenders at Qatia held out until mid-afternoon before being overwhelmed, and B and D Squadrons, which had been heavily engaged in the attempt to reach Qatia, retired back to Romani. The Battle of Katia cost the Royal Gloucestershire Hussars 98 casualties, most of them being taken prisoner, and only nine men of A Squadron evaded death or captivity. The squadron was criticised for advancing too far, and an Australian soldier who visited Qatia labelled the yeomen "country bumpkins led by privileged toffs". When Lieutenant-General Sir Philip Chetwode unveiled the Royal Gloucestershire Hussars war memorial in 1922, he countered the "very wrong criticism", saying that "there was nothing to be ashamed of, but everything to make them proud of their regiment".

While A Squadron was being rebuilt, B and D Squadrons joined a squadron from the Worcestershire Hussars to form a composite regiment within the 5th Mounted Brigade. On 4 August, D Squadron, detached to the 42nd (East Lancashire) Infantry Division, played a conspicuous role in the Battle of Romani when it plugged and held for three hours a dangerous gap on the initiative of its commander, Major Charles Turner, for which he was awarded the Distinguished Service Order (DSO). The squadron rejoined the composite regiment after the 5th Mounted Brigade arrived in support, and when the Anzac and British mounted brigades counter-attacked in the afternoon, the regiment took a ridge at the gallop and subsequently captured 500 prisoners, a battery of four guns and two machine guns. For the rest of the battle, the 5th Mounted Brigade came under command of the ANZAC Mounted Division and took part in the capture of Qatia and the pursuit of the enemy to Bir el Abd. British Empire forces continued to advance across the Sinai, and the regiment was next in action on 9 January 1917, in the Battle of Rafa, during which it fought dismounted, suffering 46 casualties.

=== Palestine ===
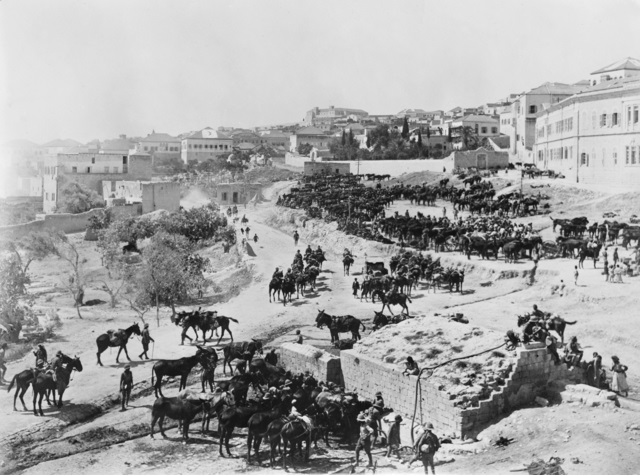
Cavalry watering at Mary's Well in Nazareth 1918

Following the Battle of Rafa, the 5th Mounted Brigade transferred from corps troops to the Imperial Mounted Division (renamed in June to the Australian Mounted Division) in the Desert Column (reorganised in August as the Desert Mounted Corps). On 26 March, the mounted divisions, less the Royal Gloucestershire Hussars, invested Gaza from the east and north in the First Battle of Gaza. The regiment, attached to the 53rd (Welsh) Infantry Division, was deployed along the coast, covering the division's left flank as it attacked Gaza from the south. The attempt to capture Gaza suffered from delays caused by fog, and the attack was called off in the late afternoon. The Second Battle of Gaza in April, during which the regiment fought with the rest of the cavalry as mounted infantry on the right flank of the main infantry attack, fared no better, and the opposing sides settled into a period of inaction.

In June, General Edmund Allenby was appointed commander of the Egyptian Expeditionary Force, and at the end of October he resumed the British Empire offensive in southern Palestine. The regiment was in corps reserve during the Battle of Beersheba, but saw action on 4 November in the Battle of Tel el Khuweilfe, during which it suffered 14 casualties. The regiment supported, but did not participate in, the Charge at Huj, and fought a defensive action on 12 November, immediately before the Battle of Mughar Ridge, when a Turkish counter-attack pushed the 5th Mounted Brigade back from Balin at a cost to the regiment of 21 casualties. In the early hours of 1 December, the regiment helped defeat a Turkish counter-attack against the high ground north and north-east of Jaffa, and for the rest of the month it was employed in guard duties, reconnaissance, fortification works and as divisional reserve.

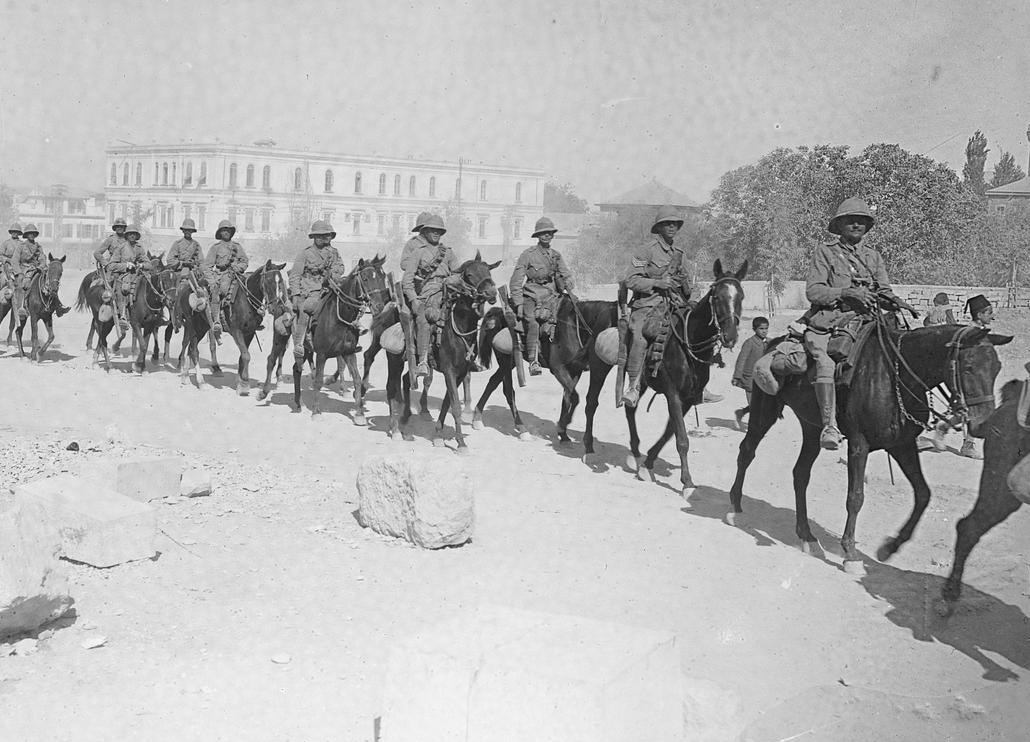
Gloucestershires enter Damascus, October 1918.

The regiment remained in reserve while Allenby secured his right flank with the occupation of the Jordan valley in early 1918, and when not on duty the men entertained themselves with fox hunts, a steeplechase, and periods of leave in Jaffa and Jerusalem. At the end of April, the regiment travelled a biblical route through Jerusalem, Calvary, the Mount of Olives, Gethsemane, Jericho, Mount Nebo, the alleged site of the inn of the Good Samaritan and across the Jordan valley. It fought dismounted in the Second Action of Es Salt at the beginning of May, and when that operation ended in defeat, it retired with the British Empire forces back into the valley. The regiment remained until August in the "valley of death", where temperatures peaked above 54 °C (129 °F) and malaria was a constant problem, with only brief periods of relief. It suffered more from sickness in the inhospitable environment than from enemy action; in May alone the regiment suffered 16 casualties in battle, while 116 men were hospitalised due to illness.

In August, the 5th Mounted Brigade became the 13th Cavalry Brigade and was transferred to the 5th Cavalry Division, which moved to the coastal sector in preparation for the next phase of the offensive. On 19 September, the division led the exploitation of a breach made in the enemy lines by the infantry in the Battle of Sharon, and after an advance of over 50 miles (80 km) the regiment, acting in the traditional cavalry role, entered Nazareth with swords drawn early the next day. Although it was ordered to withdraw later that morning, it returned and completed the capture of the town on 21 September. By the end of September the regiment had reached Damascus, and on 27 October, shortly before the Armistice of Mudros ended hostilities, it entered Aleppo. During the march, the regiment recovered the sword of Captain Lloyd-Baker, commander of A Squadron, over two years after it was taken by the Turks following his death at Qatia, and on 21 November the regiment entertained nine of its own recently released prisoners of war who had been captured at Qatia.

== Between the wars ==
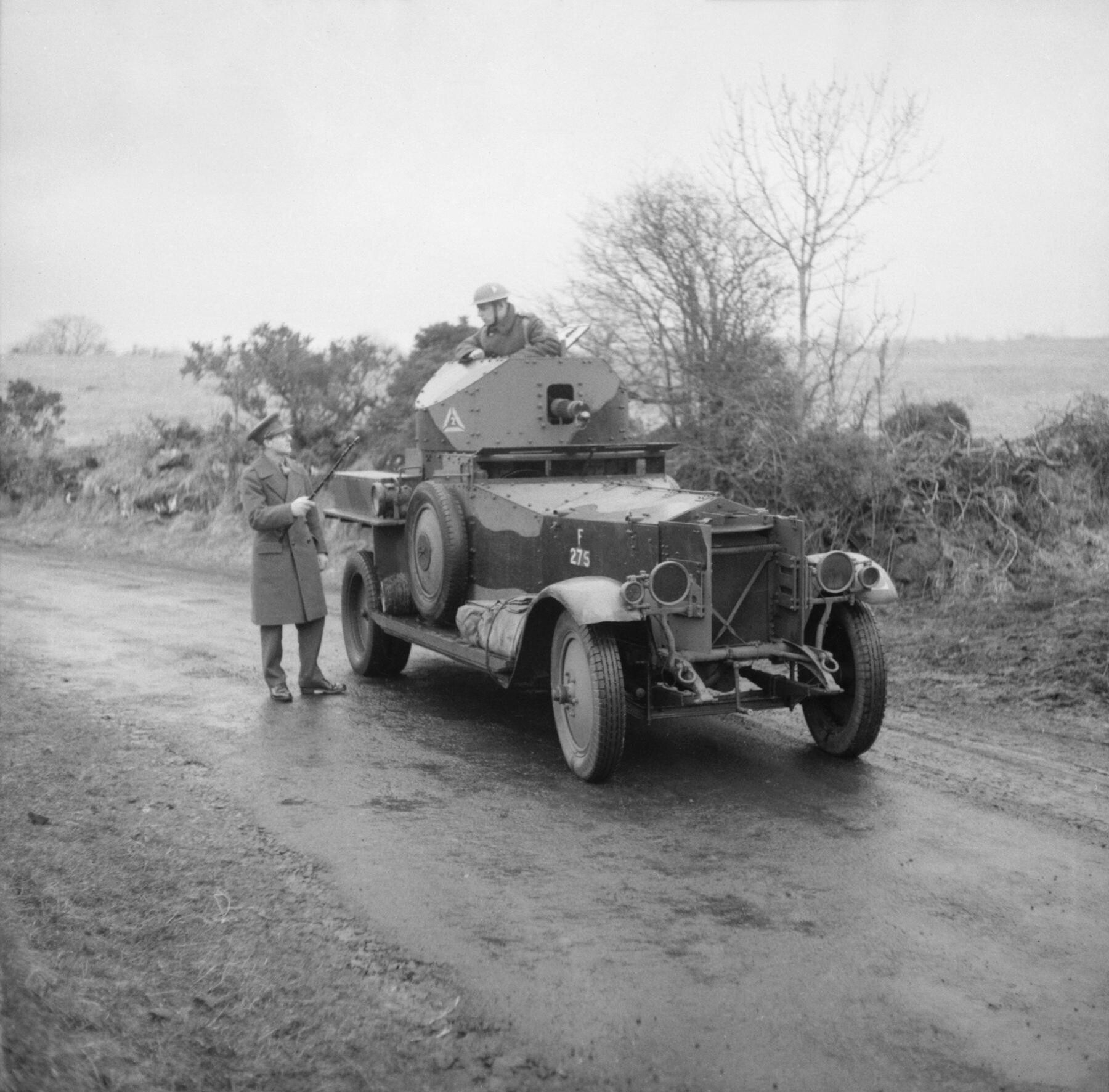
Rolls-Royce Armoured Car

The regiment remained in Palestine immediately after the war and was demobilised in stages. The first party returned to the UK in January 1919, only two squadrons remained by March, and those not yet eligible for demobilisation were transferred to the Sherwood Rangers Yeomanry in June. The remaining cadre of 28 men began their journey home at the end of June and arrived in Gloucester on 15 August. The names of the 28 officers and 200 other ranks of the regiment killed in the war are recorded on the Royal Gloucestershire Hussars war memorial, unveiled on 29 April 1922 in the grounds of Gloucester Cathedral.

The Territorial Force was reconstituted in 1920 and renamed the Territorial Army (TA) shortly afterwards, and the Royal Gloucestershire Hussars began to recruit new members. On 21 October, its strength was 10 officers and 37 other ranks, rising to 16 officers and 208 other ranks by August 1921. The same year, the War Office ruled that only the fourteen most senior yeomanry regiments would be retained as cavalry, and offered the remainder the choice of converting to units of the Royal Field Artillery or reducing in size and converting to armoured car companies. On 25 November, the regiment chose the latter to become the 21st (Royal Gloucestershire Hussars) Armoured Car Company (TA) in the Royal Tank Corps (renamed in 1939 to the Royal Tank Regiment). The company comprised a headquarters (HQ) and four sections, each section equipped with four Peerless armoured cars, replaced in 1928–1929 by Rolls-Royce Armoured Cars.

As war loomed again in Europe, the UK expanded its armed forces. The 21st (Royal Gloucestershire Hussars) Armoured Car Company was converted to a full armoured regiment and, on 30 April 1939, regained its original title as the Royal Gloucestershire Hussars. The TA was doubled in size, with each regiment creating a duplicate, and in the summer of 1939 the 1st Royal Gloucestershire Hussars was recruiting in Gloucester, Cirencester and Bristol, while the 2nd Royal Gloucestershire Hussars was recruiting in Gloucester, Cheltenham, Stroud and Tetbury. Attendance at the annual camp in July 1939 was about 1,000 yeomen, compared to some 300 the previous year.

== Second World War ==
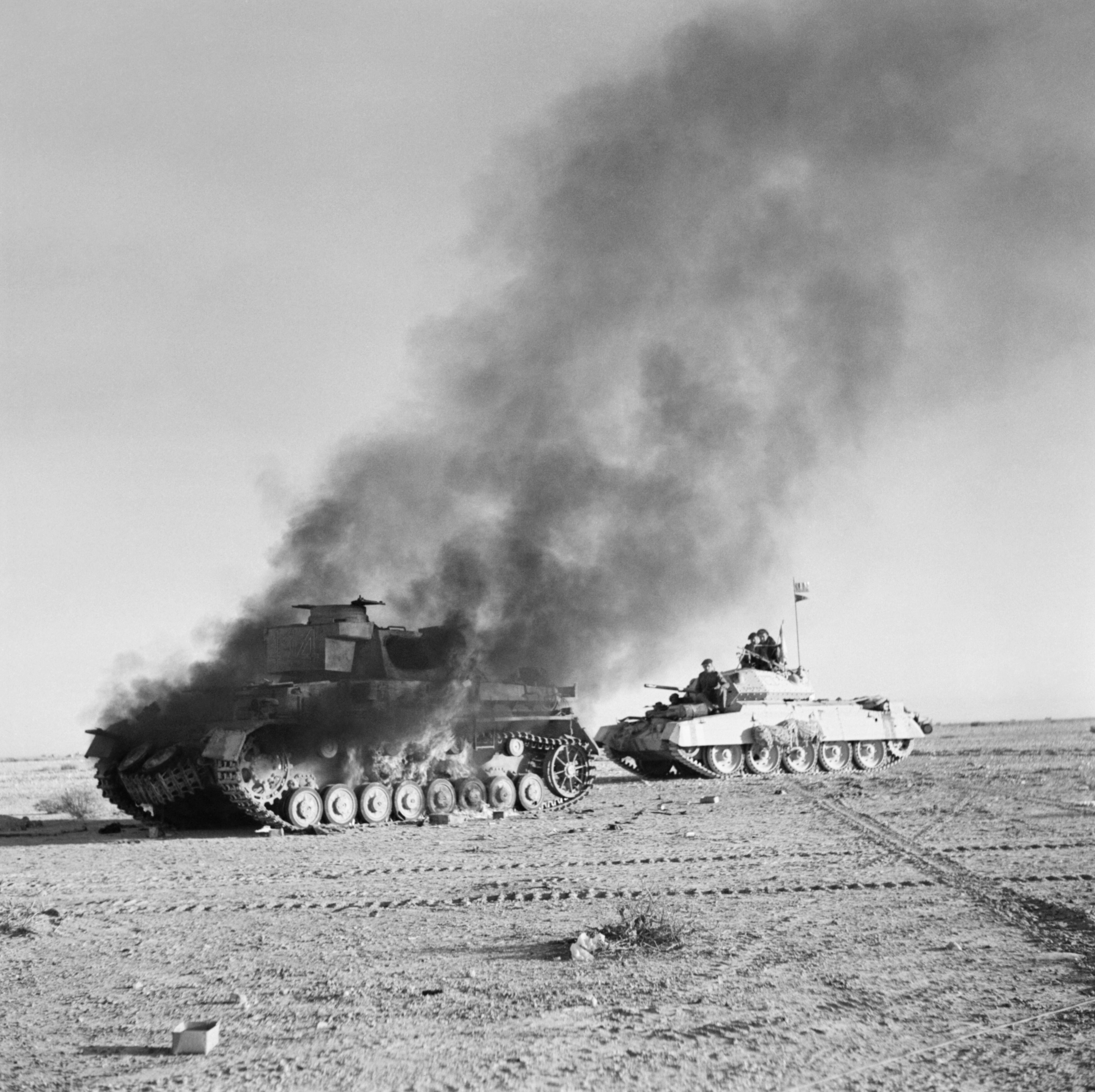
A Royal Gloucestershire Hussars Crusader passes a burning German tank during Operation Crusader

On the outbreak of the Second World War, the 1st Royal Gloucestershire Hussars was equipped with Vickers Mk. IV and Mk. VI light tanks and initially served in home defence as part of the 20th Light Armoured Brigade. It was later re-equipped with Valentine tanks and earmarked for service in North Africa as part of the 6th Armoured Division, but a last minute change resulted in the unit remaining in the UK as a training regiment which, by the war's end, had trained over 5,000 officers and men. As the war was nearing its conclusion the regiment was equipped with Churchill tanks and prepared for service in the Far East, but following VJ Day it was re-equipped with Sherman tanks and Greyhound armoured cars and sent instead to Austria as part of the army of occupation in December 1945. The 3rd Royal Gloucestershire Hussars was actually a troop of one officer and 30 men. It served variously as a training regiment, trials unit and decoy, constructing dummy tanks to deceive the enemy about the disposition and strength of British armour.

After completing its training in the UK, the 2nd Royal Gloucestershire Hussars deployed to Egypt in October 1941. By the middle of November it had assembled 76 miles (122 km) south-west of Mersa Matruh, close to the Libyan border, as part of the 22nd Armoured Brigade attached to the 7th Armoured Division, the Desert Rats. At this stage the regiment comprised 43 officers and 585 other ranks organised into three tank squadrons – F, G and H – with a regimental HQ and a rear echelon component responsible for supply. It was equipped with 52 Crusader tanks, 10 scout vehicles and 112 wheeled vehicles.

=== Operation Crusader ===
In Operation Crusader, the 7th Armoured Division was tasked with locating and destroying the Axis armour, and the 2nd Royal Gloucestershire Hussars was the lead element of the 22nd Armoured Brigade's advance. On 19 November, the brigade encountered the Italian Ariete Division, and in the ensuing action at Bir el Gubi it lost 40 tanks. Of the brigade's three regiments, the 2nd Royal Gloucestershire Hussars fared the worst. The regiment overran some Italian anti-tank positions, but without infantry support it could not take their surrender. The Italians subsequently returned to their guns and caught the regiment's tanks in a crossfire. The Crusader's armour could be defeated at ranges of 1,500 yards (1,400 m) while its gun was ineffective at ranges greater than 800 yards (730 m), and at one stage the regiment was outnumbered five or six to one. The day's fighting cost the regiment 30 tanks and some 50 casualties. Among the wounded was the regiment's commanding officer, Lieutenant-Colonel Charles Birley, who, after suffering a broken arm when his tank was disabled, sat exposed on another and directed the regiment until it withdrew at the end of the day, for which action he was awarded the DSO.

The regiment, down to a single composite squadron of 19 tanks, was in action again on 22 and 23 November at Sidi Rezegh. The 7th Armoured Division was badly mauled by the German 15th and 21st Panzer Divisions before the German armour broke contact and pushed on towards the Egyptian border. In the respite, the regiment, which at one stage had been reduced to just four Crusaders, was reinforced with five M3 Stuarts – named Honey by the British – five Crusaders, and a squadron of Cruiser Mk IVs from the 2nd Royal Tank Regiment. The regiment fought next in the Sidi Rezegh area on 27 and 28 November, finding itself once again outgunned by enemy armour returning from its raid on the Egyptian border. After the battle, the regiment was withdrawn and re-equipped with 52 Honeys which had already seen battle with the 8th King's Royal Irish Hussars. As well as materiel losses, the fighting to date had cost the regiment 16 officers and 70 other ranks. Major W. A. B. Trevor, who had assumed command of the regiment after Birley was wounded, was awarded the DSO for his handling of the regiment.

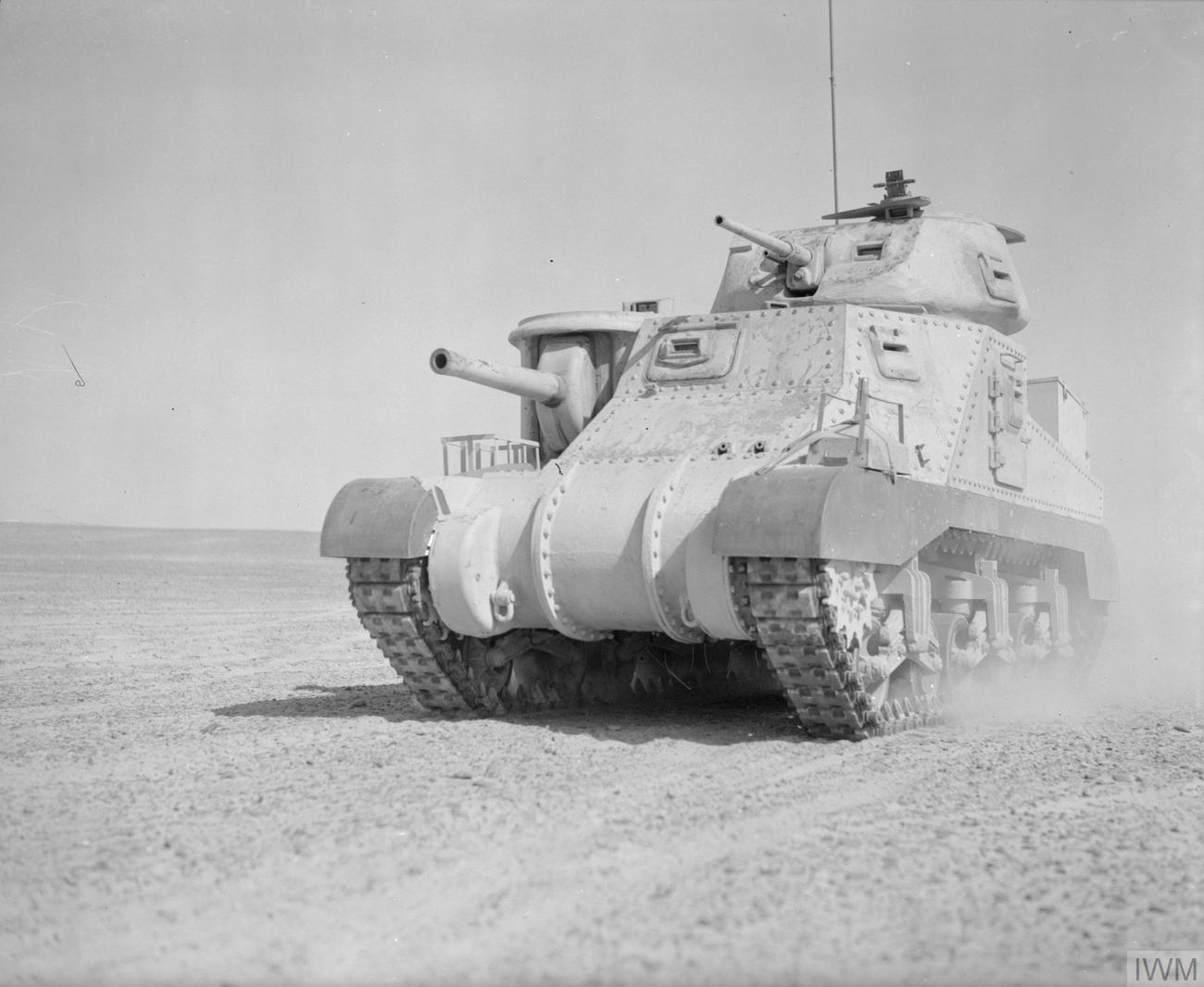
Grant tank

In December, the regiment fought at various times under command of the 7th Armoured Division's Support Group and the 4th Armoured Brigade. It rejoined the 22nd Armoured Brigade in the last week of December and completed a long march across the desert as the British and Commonwealth forces pushed the Axis forces out of Cyrenaica. As Operation Crusader drew to a close, the regiment saw action around Chor es Sufan on 28 and 30 December, after which the 7th Armoured Division was relieved by the 1st Armoured Division. In total, the regiment had suffered 169 casualties.

=== Battle of Gazala ===
Birley, his arm in a sling, resumed command of the regiment on 13 January 1942, and when a German Africa Corps counter-attack pushed the British and Commonwealth forces back to Gazala later that month, he commanded Birley Force, a composite regiment to which the 2nd Royal Gloucestershire Hussars contributed the HQ and a squadron of tanks. The regiment was re-equipped in the first week of February; F Squadron with the new M3 Grant tanks, and G and H Squadrons with Crusaders, and in May its strength was 36 officers, 563 other ranks and 48 tanks. At the end of May, with the 22nd Armoured Brigade now returned to its parent unit, the 1st Armoured Division, the regiment saw action in the Battle of Gazala. It fought in the areas of Bir el Harmat and 'Knightsbridge', a defensive box held by the 201st Guards Motor Brigade some 20 miles (32 km) south-west of Tobruk. At the start of the battle, F Squadron lost all but one of its Grants, and the regiment was quickly reduced to 16 Crusaders and two Honeys. These were formed into a composite squadron under command of the 3rd County of London Yeomanry. On 1 June the regiment handed over its remaining Crusaders to the 4th County of London Yeomanry and was taken out of the line for a refit the next day.

The regiment returned to the line on 4 June with Honeys and Grants taken over from the 4th Queen's Own Hussars; 14 tanks each in G and H Squadrons, 4 in the regimental HQ and 12 Grants in F Squadron. The next day it participated in a failed attack at Bir el Aslagh in the 'Cauldron', a German salient behind the original British and Commonwealth lines. It then retired east to Knightsbridge where, on 6 June, the command tank was hit, killing Birley and the regiment's adjutant. The regiment was by this stage down to a strength of 17 Honeys and two Grants, and for the next two days, with Trevor once again in command, it acted as a patrol squadron for 22nd Armoured Brigade. On 10 June, H Squadron was attached to the 7th Motor Brigade (the former Support Group) fighting around Bir Hacheim. It remained with that brigade until the end of the month, while the remainder of the regiment was withdrawn from the line. In addition to the losses in materiel, the Battle of Gazala had cost the regiment 82 casualties, and on 12 June another was added to the list when Trevor was killed in an airstrike. Over the next few days the remaining senior officers appealed to brigade, division and corps commanders to prevent the regiment from being split up and used as replacements.

=== Dispersal and disbandment ===
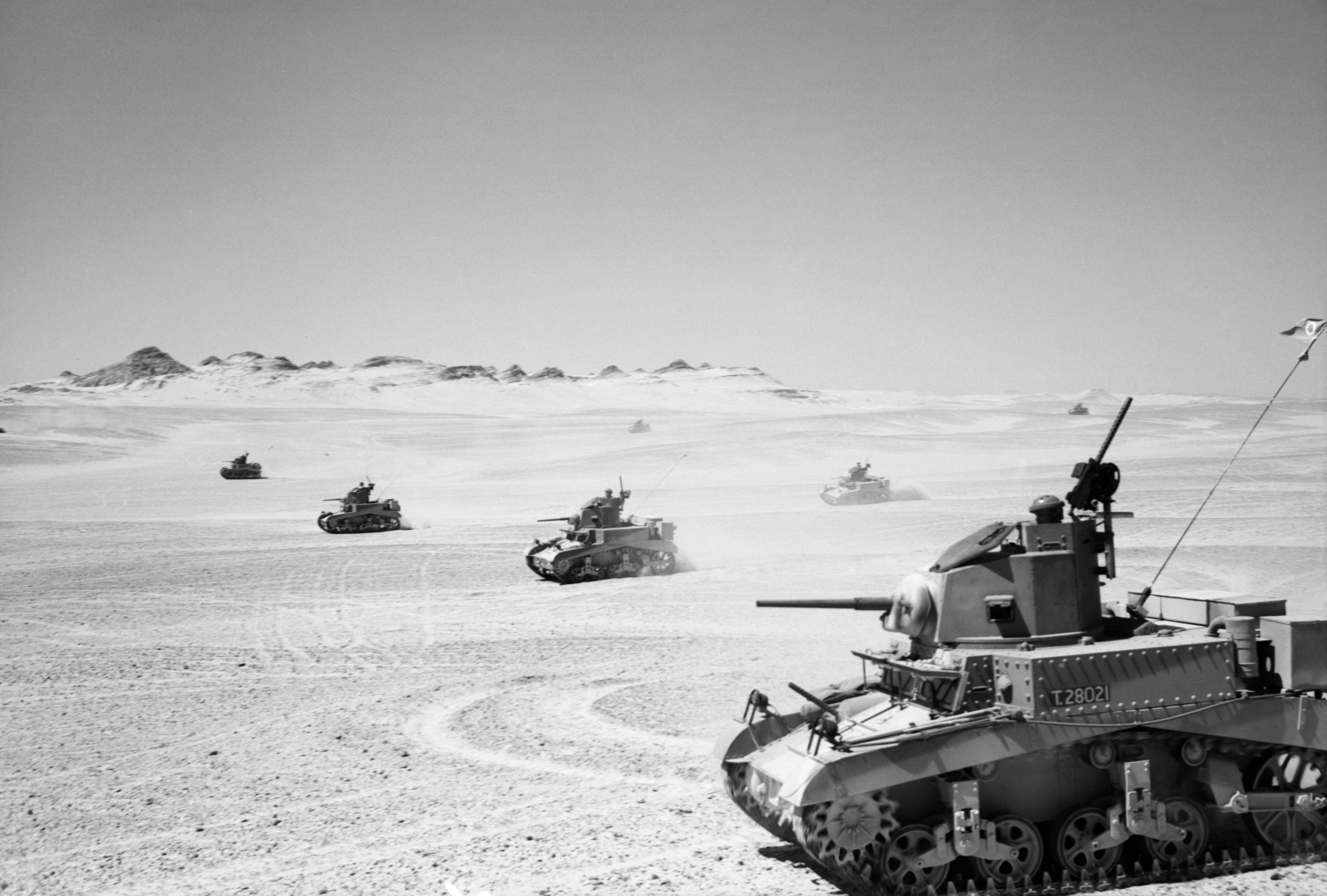
M3 Stuarts belonging to the 8th Hussars, who handed them over to the Royal Gloucestershire Hussars during Operation Crusader.

Following defeat in the Battle of Gazala, the British and Commonwealth forces halted the Axis advance in the First Battle of El Alamein, in which G Squadron fought while attached at various times to the 1st Armoured Division Tank Delivery Regiment, the 4th County of London Yeomanry and the 9th Queen's Royal Lancers. Meanwhile, F and H Squadrons became infantry in the 10th Armoured Division and, armed with Italian anti-tank rifles, grenades and molotov cocktails, manned defences in the Delta. At the end of July, H Squadron took over the Crusaders of A Squadron, 5th Royal Tank Regiment (RTR), and relieved them in the El Alamein line, and F Squadron similarly replaced 5RTR's C Squadron on 17 August. The same month, G Squadron was given Crusaders and allocated to Army reserve at El Amiriya, serving at various times under the command of the 8th Hussars, an Indian brigade, the 9th Australian Division and finally the 10th Royal Hussars. The regiment's rear echelon and some of its HQ troops guarded bridges over the Nile in the Delta. (Note: As an indication of the disarray the British and Commonwealth forces found themselves in following the retreat to and stand on the El Alamein line, G Squadron was one of three fighting squadrons in the 10th Royal Hussars, none of which actually belonged to the 10th Royal Hussars.)

During the Battle of Alam el Halfa, the regiment's F and H Squadrons fought as units of the 5th Royal Tank Regiment, and G Squadron was part of an abortive 9th Australian Division attack along the coast. The three squadrons were reunited in Alexandria on 20 September, but any hopes that the regiment would fight again under its own command were dashed when F, G and H Squadrons were transferred to the 4th Hussars, the Royal Wiltshire Yeomanry and the 8th Hussars respectively. HQ Squadron was divided between the 5th Royal Tank Regiment and the 3rd The King's Own Hussars, and the 2nd Royal Gloucestershire Hussars was disbanded on 15 January 1943. During its brief career the regiment had lost 72 men killed, 100 wounded and 85 taken prisoner of war, and was awarded two DSOs, seven Military Crosses, a Distinguished Conduct Medal and fourteen Military Medals.

== Post war ==
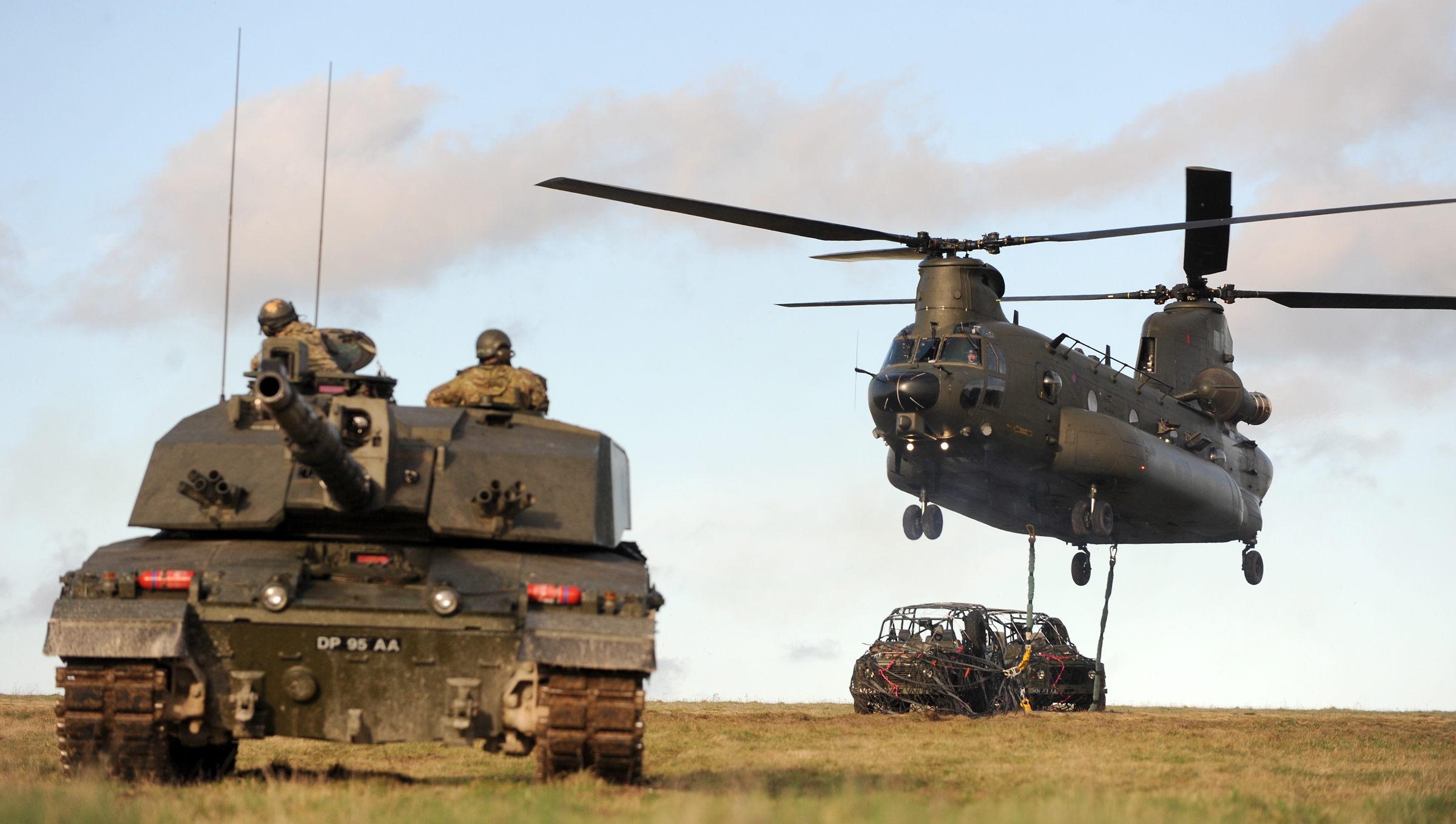
A Royal Wessex Yeomanry Challenger 2 on exercise

The regiment was reconstituted in the reconnaissance role in 1947, equipped initially with Daimler Armoured Cars which were later replaced by Ferret scout vehicles. On 27 May 1962, a new Guidon was presented on behalf of the Queen by Colonel the Duke of Beaufort at Badminton House, and in 1963 the regiment was granted the Freedom of Gloucester. In 1967, following a reorganisation of the TA, the regiment was reduced to a squadron and combined with elements of the North Somerset and Bristol Yeomanry, the 5th Battalion Gloucestershire Regiment and the Gloucestershire Volunteer Artillery to form the Wessex Volunteers. A further reorganisation in 1969 reduced the squadron to a cadre of eight men, but it was expanded two years later to provide the regimental HQ and two squadrons in the infantry-roled Wessex Yeomanry, which in 1979 became the Royal Wessex Yeomanry. In 1983, the new yeomanry regiment was equipped with stripped-down Land Rovers and took on the reconnaissance role. It was further reorganised and re-purposed as an armoured reserve regiment in the 1990s, tasked with the provision of replacement crews for the regular army's Challenger 2 tanks. The Gloucestershire yeomanry lineage is maintained in the Royal Wessex Yeomanry by C (Royal Gloucestershire Hussars) Squadron.

== Battle honours ==
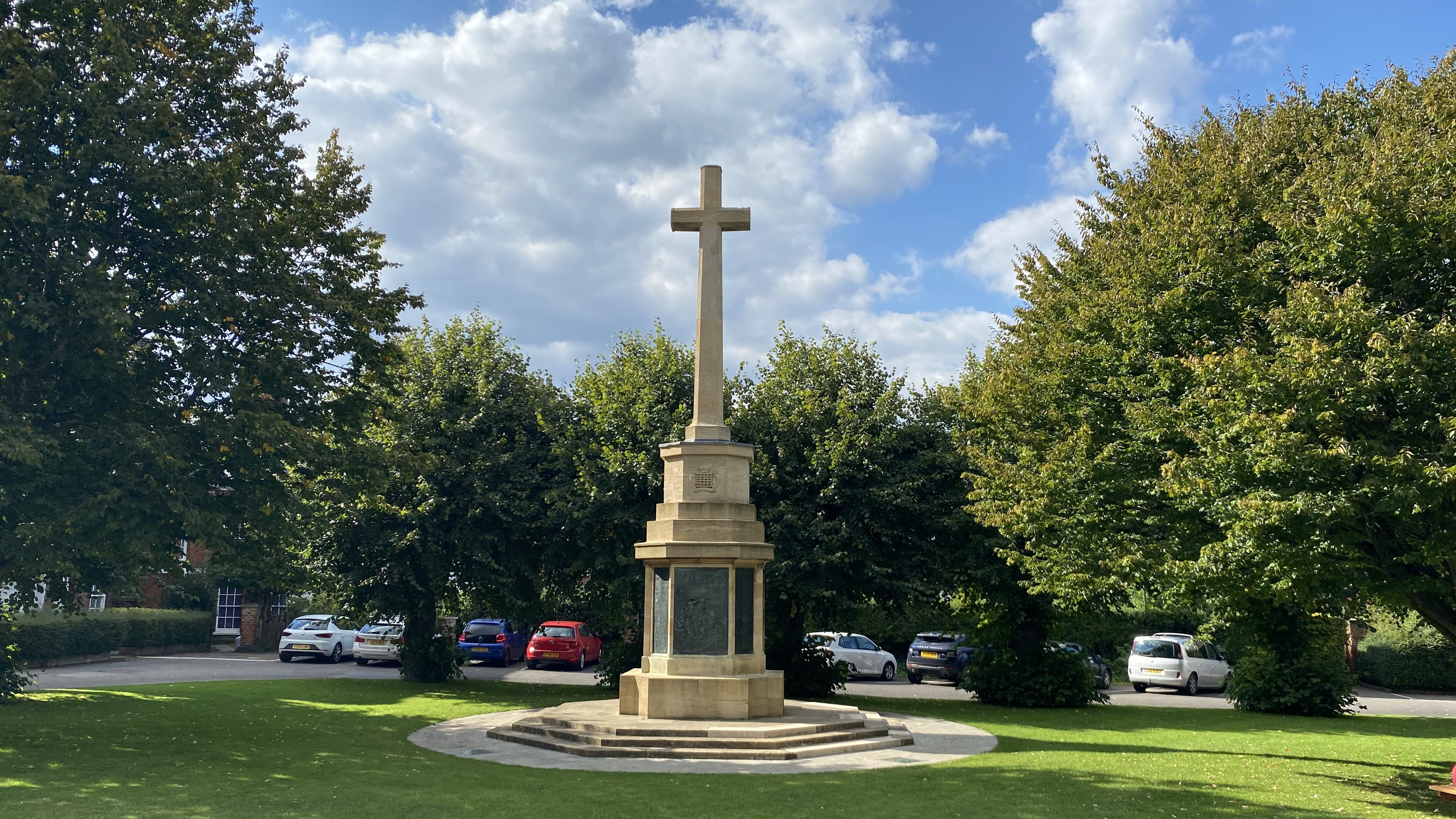
Royal Gloucestershire Hussars war memorial

The battle honours earned by the regiment were:

Boer War	South Africa 1900–01
First World War	Suvla, Scimitar Hill, Gallipoli 1915, Rumani, Rafah, Egypt 1915–17, Gaza, El Mughar, Nebi Samwil, Jerusalem, Megiddo, Sharon, Damascus, Palestine 1917–18
Second World War	Tobruk 1941, Gubi I, Sidi Rezegh 1941, Chor es Sufan, Gazala, Bir el Aslagh, Cauldron, Alam el Halfa, West Point 23, North Africa 1941–42

== Honorary Regimental Colonels ==
Honorary colonels were:

Royal Gloucestershire Hussars

- 1904– Col. Henry Somerset, 9th Duke of Beaufort, TD, DL, JP, ADC
- 1926– Col. Henry Somerset, 10th Duke of Beaufort, KG, GCVO, PC
- 1967– Col. Henry Somerset, 10th Duke of Beaufort, KG, GCVO, PC [reappointed]
- 1969– Col. Henry Somerset, 10th Duke of Beaufort, KG, GCVO, PC [reappointed]

C (Royal Gloucestershire Hussars) Squadron, Royal Wessex Yeomanry (1971)

- 1972– Col. Henry Somerset, 10th Duke of Beaufort, KG, GCVO, PC [reappointed]
- 1984– Lt. (Hon. Col.) David Somerset, 11th Duke of Beaufort
- 1994– Col. John Evelyn Baring Hills, TD, DL
- 1999– Lt-Col. David R. Ayshford-Sanford, TD
- 2025– Lt-Col. Rupert Ponsonby, 7th Baron de Mauley, TD

== See also ==
- List of Yeomanry Regiments 1908
- British yeomanry during the First World War
- Second line yeomanry regiments of the British Army

== Bibliography ==
- Becke, Major A. F. (1936). Order of Battle of Divisions Part 2A. The Territorial Force Mounted Divisions and the 1st-Line Territorial Force Divisions (42–56). London: His Majesty's Stationery Office. ISBN 978-1-871167-12-2.
- Beckett, Ian Frederick William (2011). Britain's Part-Time Soldiers: The Amateur Military Tradition: 1558–1945. Barnsley, South Yorkshire: Pen & Sword Military. ISBN 978-1-84884-395-0.
- Bellis, Malcolm A. (1994). Regiments of the British Army 1939–1945 (Armour & Infantry). London: Military Press International. ISBN 978-0-85420-999-6.
- Clifford, Rollo (1991). The Royal Gloucestershire Hussars. Stroud: Alan Sutton. ISBN 978-0-86299-982-7.
- Falls, Cyril; MacMunn, G. (1930). Military Operations Egypt & Palestine: From the Outbreak of War With Germany to June 1917. Official History of the Great War Based on Official Documents by Direction of the Historical Section of the Committee of Imperial Defence. Vol. I. London: HM Stationery Office. OCLC 610273484.
- Fox, Frank (1923). The History of the Royal Gloucestershire Hussars Yeomanry, 1898–1922: The Great Cavalry Campaign in Palestine. London: Philip Allan & Co. OCLC 5202902.
- Robin, Grist (2018). A Gallant County: The Regiments of Gloucestershire in the Great War. Barnsley, South Yorkshire: Pen & Sword Military. ISBN 978-1-52673-607-9.
- James, Brigadier E. A. (1978). British Regiments 1914–18. London: Samson Books Limited. ISBN 978-0-906304-03-7.
- Mileham, Patrick (2003). The Yeomanry Regiments; Over 200 Years of Tradition. Staplehurst: Spellmount. ISBN 978-1-86227-167-8.
- Murphy, W. E. (1961). Fairbrother, Monty C. (ed.). The Relief of Tobruk. The Official History of New Zealand in the Second World War 1939–1945 (New Zealand Electronic Text Collection ed.). Wellington, NZ: War History Branch, Department of Internal Affairs. OCLC 264042939.
- Neillands, Robin (1995). The Desert Rats. London: Orion Books. ISBN 978-0-7528-0298-5.
- Perry, F. W. (1992). Order of Battle of Divisions Part 5A. The Divisions of Australia, Canada and New Zealand and those in East Africa. Newport: Ray Westlake Military Books. ISBN 978-1-871167-25-2.
- Pitman, Stuart (2014). Second Royal Gloucestershire Hussars. Uckfield, East Sussex: The Naval & Military Press. ISBN 978-1-84574-992-7.
- Powles, C. Guy; Wilkie, A. (1922). The New Zealanders in Sinai and Palestine. Official History New Zealand's Effort in the Great War. Vol. III. Auckland: Whitcombe & Tombs. OCLC 2959465.
- "War diary (2 R.G.H.)". D4920 – Papers relating to the Royal Goucestershire Hussars, ID: D4920/1/4/1. Gloucester: Gloucestershire Archives, The National Archives.
- Wyndham-Quin, Henry (2005) [1898]. The Yeomanry Cavalry of Gloucestershire and Monmouth (Facsimile ed.). Wormbridge, Herefordshire: Golden Valley Publications. ISBN 978-0-9542578-5-9.
