= Speedway =

Speedway may refer to:

== Racing ==
=== Race tracks ===
- Daytona International Speedway, a race track in Daytona Beach, Florida.
- Edmonton International Speedway, also known as Speedway Park, a former motor raceway in Edmonton, Alberta.
- Indianapolis Motor Speedway, a motor raceway in Speedway, Indiana
- Fuji Speedway, a race track in Oyama, Japan.

=== Types of races and race courses ===
- Cycle speedway, a form of bicycle racing
- Dirt track racing, known as speedway in Australia and New Zealand
- Motorcycle speedway, a form of motorcycle sport
- Oval track racing, motor racing on an oval track which turns in one direction
- Sidecar speedway, a form of sidecar racing

== Geography ==
- Speedway, Indiana, a town in Marion County, Indiana, home of the Indianapolis Motor Speedway
- Speedway, West Virginia, an unincorporated community in Mercer County

== Arts, entertainment, and media ==
- Speedway (1929 film), a silent film
- Speedway (1968 film), a film starring Elvis Presley and Nancy Sinatra
  - Speedway (soundtrack), 1968
    - "Speedway" (song), a song by Elvis Presley
- Speedway (2023 film), alternative title of the 2023 Australian film The Speedway Murders
- Speedway (band), a Scottish band who entered the UK charts in 2003
- Speedway, a 1969 racing electro-mechanical game by Chicago Coin
- "Speedway", a song by Black Midi from Schlagenheim

== Other uses ==
- Speedway (store), a chain of gas stations
- USS Speedway (SP-407), a United States Navy patrol boat in commission from 1917 to 1919
- A brand of the Gas Engine & Power Company & Charles L. Seabury Company

== See also ==
- race track
- highway
