= LDY =

LDY could refer to:

- City of Derry Airport, Northern Ireland, IATA airport code
- County Londonderry, Northern Ireland, Chapman code
- Ladybank railway station, Fife, Scotland; National Rail station code
- Leicestershire and Derbyshire Yeomanry; Former British Army Regiment
