= Raceway Park =

Raceway Park has several uses including:

== Horse racing ==
- Raceway Park (Ohio)

== Auto racing ==
- Indianapolis Raceway Park
- Houston Raceway Park
- Nebraska Raceway Park
- Dells Raceway Park
- Raceway Park (Illinois)
- Raceway Park (Minnesota)
- Old Bridge Township Raceway Park, in Old Bridge, New Jersey
- Rolling Wheels Raceway Park
