= Speedway, West Virginia =

- Unincorporated community
- Location within the state of West Virginia Speedway, West Virginia (the United States)
- Coordinates: 37°27′23″N 81°00′37″W
- Country: United States
- State: West Virginia
- County: Mercer
- Elevation: 2,559 ft (780 m)
- Time zone: UTC-5 (Eastern (EST))
  - Summer (DST): UTC-4 (EDT)
- Area codes: 304 & 681
- GNIS feature ID: 1547121

Speedway is an unincorporated community in Mercer County, West Virginia, United States. Speedway is located on West Virginia Route 20, 2.5 miles (4.0 km) north of Athens.

The community most likely takes its name from the highway which runs through the town site.
