= Royal Wessex Yeomanry =

Reserve armoured regiment of the British Army

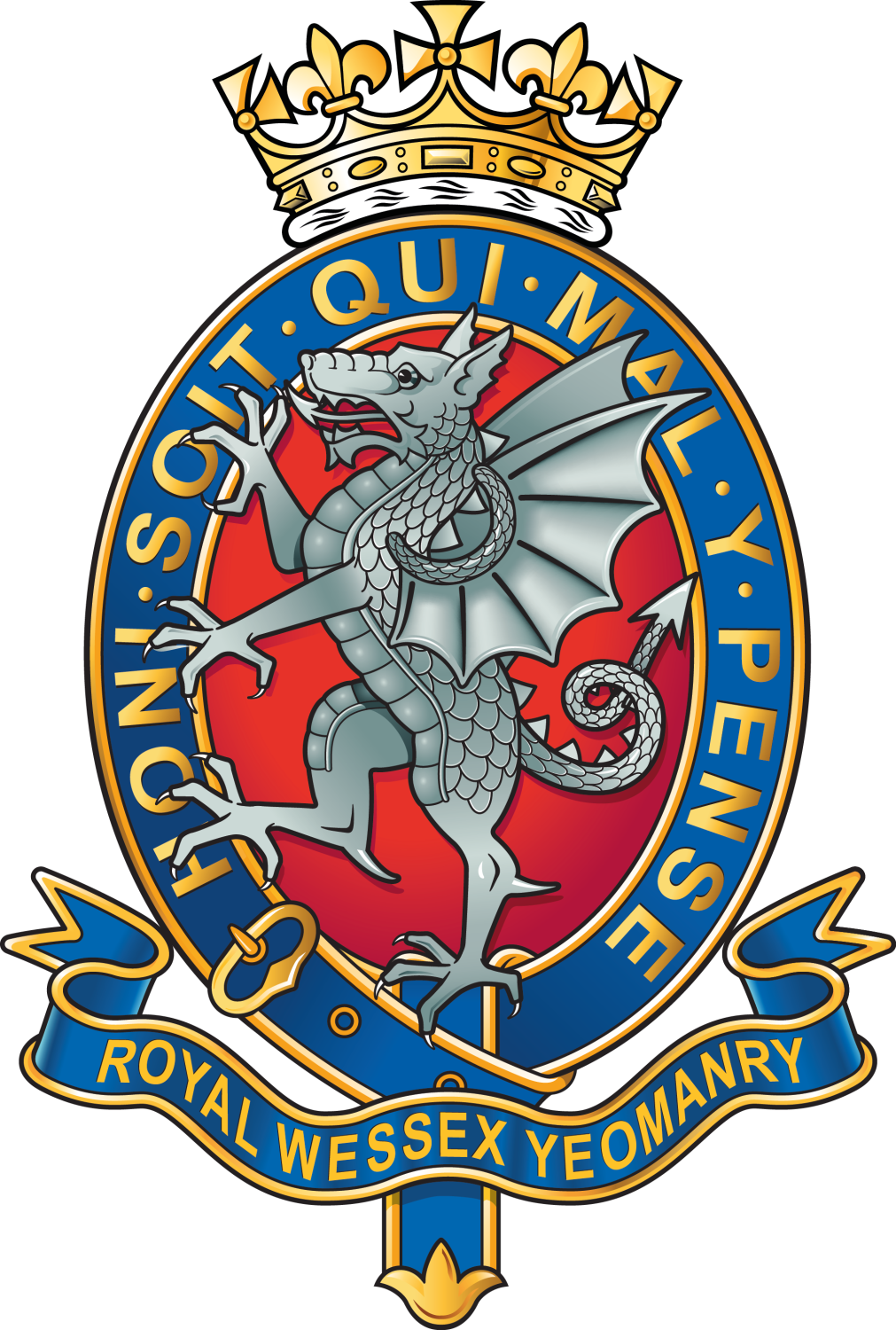
- Cap badge of The Royal Wessex Yeomanry
- Active: 1 April 1971 – present
- Allegiance: United Kingdom
- Branch: British Army
- Type: Yeomanry
- Role: Tank warfare
- Size: Regiment
- Part of: Royal Armoured Corps
- Headquarters: Allenby Barracks, Bovington Camp, Dorset, England
- March: Slow: Scimitar Hill ( Sherborne) Quick: God Bless the Prince of Wales
- Mascots: Ramrod Darcy III, Dorset Ram

Commanders
- Current commander: Lt Col Ed Hodges
- Royal Honorary Colonel: Prince Edward, Duke of Edinburgh
- Honorary Colonel: Simon Hart

The Royal Wessex Yeomanry (RWxY) is a reserve armoured regiment of the British Army consisting of four squadrons, with the regimental headquarters based at Bovington Camp, Dorset. The regiment is part of 3rd (UK) Division and provides battle casualty replacements to the three armoured (Challenger 2) regiments. Under the Future Soldier reforms, the regiment now comes under the command of 12th Armoured Brigade Combat Team.

== History ==
The regiment can trace its history back to 4 June 1794, when a meeting of country gentlemen at the Bear Inn in Devizes decided to raise a body of ten independent troops of yeomanry for the county of Wiltshire, which became theRoyal Wiltshire Yeomanry. The Wessex Yeomanry was formed on 1 April 1969 by re-raising cadres from the Royal Wiltshire Yeomanry, the Royal Gloucestershire Hussars and the Royal Devon Yeomanry to form four squadrons. The Wessex Yeomanry was granted its royal title, becoming the Royal Wessex Yeomanry, on 8 June 1975. Initially designated as infantry, in the 1980s it was redesignated as a reconnaissance regiment and became one of the Military Home Defence Reconnaissance regiments. Following the Strategic Defence Review, the regiment merged with the Dorset Yeomanry in July 1999 and was reorganised.

Before the Army 2020 plan, the regiment had three roles:

- The training of Challenger 2 main battle tank crewmen as Turret Crew Replacements. This commitment was provided by B (RWY), C (RGH) and D (RDY) Squadrons.
- Armour Replacement, provided by A (DY) Squadron.
- The provision of skilled officers and senior non-commissioned officers to support the Regular Army on operations as 'watchkeepers' and liaison officers. This was provided by all four squadrons.

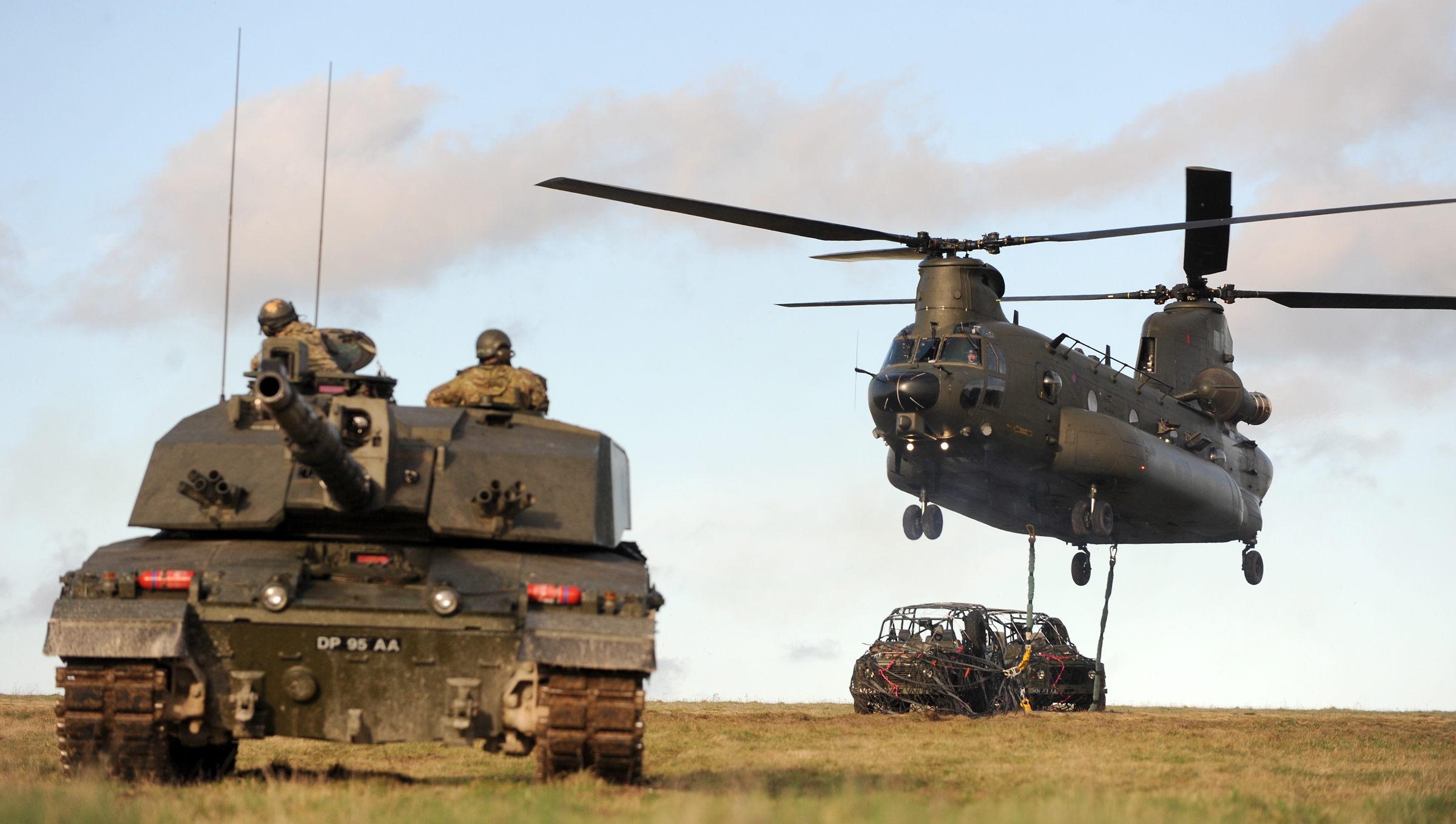
A Royal Wessex Yeomanry Challenger 2 during exercises on the Salisbury Plain in 2014.

Since 2013, the regiment has been the United Kingdom's only Armoured Reinforcement Regiment, providing armoured (main battle tank) resilience to the three remaining regular Army armoured regiments: the Queen's Royal Hussars (QRH), the King's Royal Hussars (KRH) and the Royal Tank Regiment (RTR). All five squadrons train Challenger 2 crewmen. The RWxY has conducted Challenger 2 driver training at Bovington, Sennelager (Germany), and Salisbury Plain Training Area, and live firing at Lulworth and Castlemartin Ranges.

Each squadron maintains the traditions of its forebear regiment, maintaining a sense of pride and rivalry. In 2011, there was a Regimental Celebration of 40 years since the founding of the Royal Wessex Yeomanry, although, at this time, the Dorset Yeomanry was not part of the regiment. The Earl of Wessex, the Regimental Colonel, visited, met members of the regiment and their families and also participated in a private guided tour of the neighbouring Tank Museum.

== Recruitment ==
Like all of the regiments within the British Army, the regiment accepts recruits from all over the country. However, this regiment traditionally recruits from Devon, Dorset, Gloucestershire, Shropshire and Wiltshire, along with neighbouring counties such as Cornwall, Hampshire, Oxfordshire and Somerset.

== Organisation ==
Each squadron keeps within its title the name of its antecedent, county, yeomanry regiment:

- Regimental Headquarters, at Allenby Barracks, Bovington Camp BH20
- A (Dorset Yeomanry) Squadron, at Allenby Barracks, Bovington Camp BH20
- B (Royal Wiltshire Yeomanry) Squadron, at Army Reserve Centre, Old Sarum SP4
- C (Royal Gloucestershire Hussars) Squadron, at Army Reserve Centre, Somerford Road, Cirencester GL7
  - C (Cassino) Troop, at Venning Barracks, Donnington TF2
- D (Royal Devon Yeomanry) Squadron, at Wyvern Barracks, Exeter EX2

Under the Future Soldier Programme, C and Y Squadrons amalgamated into a single C Squadron.

Unusually, B Squadron is the senior of the regiment's four squadrons. This is because the Royal Wiltshire Yeomanry is the senior Yeomanry regiment in the Yeomanry Order of Precedence, having been raised in 1794. It is not designated as A Squadron (which would be the usual practice) because there was already a Royal Wiltshire Yeomanry squadron in the Royal Yeomanry with which it could be confused. In summer 2014, this Royal Wiltshire Yeomanry Squadron joined the Royal Wessex Yeomanry, becoming Y Squadron.

The Duke of Edinburgh is the Royal Honorary Colonel of the Royal Wessex Yeomanry.

== Uniform ==
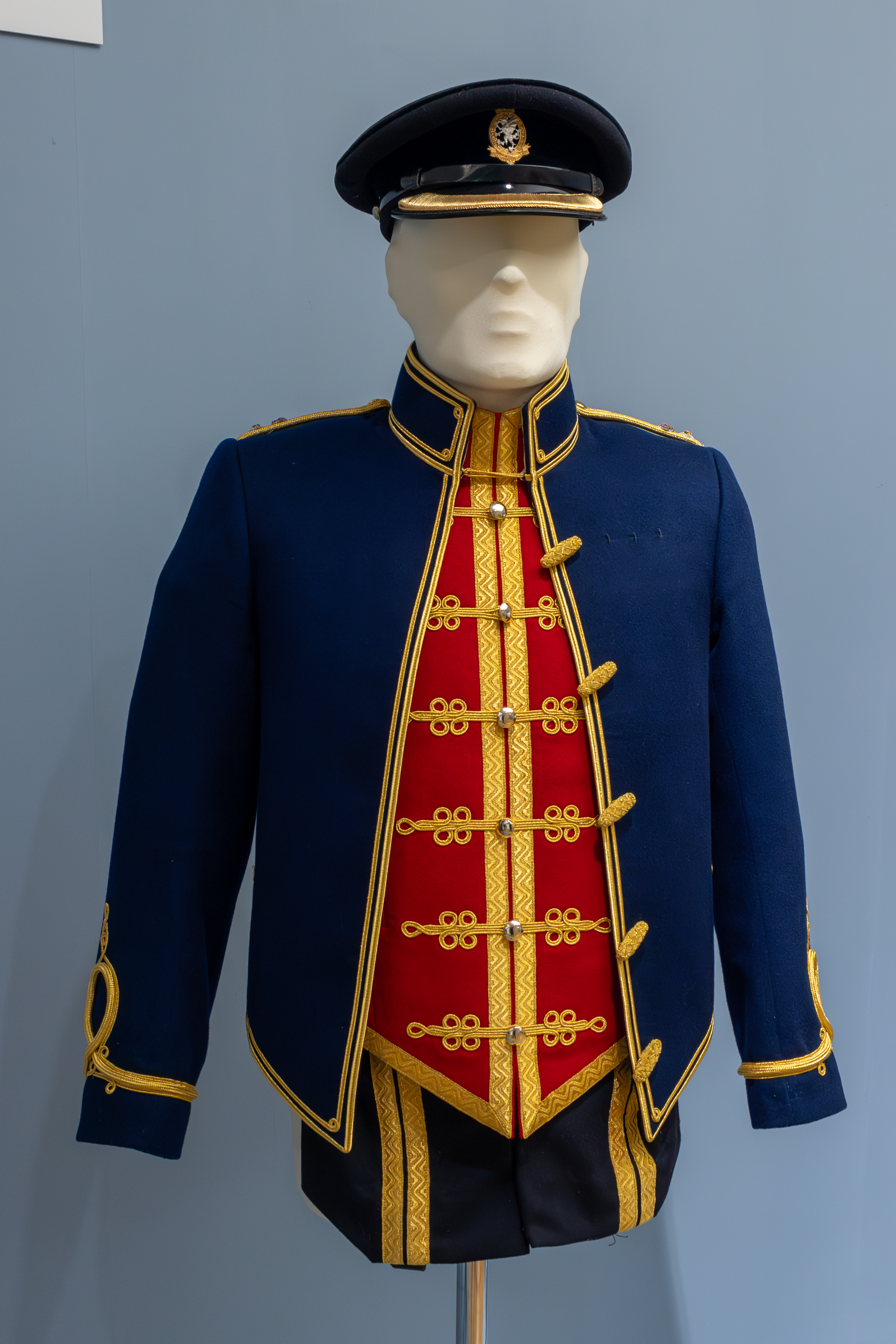
Mess dress of the Royal Wessex Yeomanry

The Royal Wessex Yeomanry Tactical Recognition Flash (TRF) is taken from the 74th (Yeomanry) Division, whose insignia was a broken spur in a black diamond during the First World War. It signifies that its units were once mounted but now serve as infantry. The TRF took its colour scheme from the facings of the collars and cuffs of the Royal Gloucestershire Hussars (buff), and the Royal Wiltshire Yeomanry, Dorset Yeomanry and Royal Devon Yeomanry (all scarlet). In 2016, the colour scheme of the TRF was changed, replacing the scarlet with blue, and the 'broken spur' replaced by a complete spur.

The regiment wears a brown beret, similar to that worn by the King's Royal Hussars, with a square black patch behind the cap badge to represent the RTR affiliation. Until July 2014, each squadron wore the cap badge of its antecedent Yeomanry regiment, meaning that, unlike most other British Army regiments, the RWxY still had four cap badges. On 5 July 2014 all squadrons, including Y Squadron (formerly A Squadron the Royal Yeomanry), adopted a single unifying cap badge featuring the white dragon of England.

== Lineage ==
1908 Haldane Reforms	1922 Amalgamations	1956 Post-War Mergers	1966 Defence White Paper	1971 TA Reforms	1990 Options for Change	1999 Strategic Defence Review	2015 Army 2020
Queen's Own Dorset Yeomanry		Converted to artillery	Disbanded (1967)			A Squadron, Royal Wessex Yeomanry (Note: Formed as a new Armoured Replacement Regiment in 1997 that did not inherit the lineage and battle honours of the Queen's Own Dorset Yeomanry)	
Royal Wiltshire Yeomanry (Prince of Wales's Own Royal Regiment)			Disbanded	B Squadron, Royal Wessex Yeomanry			
Royal Wiltshire Yeomanry (Prince of Wales's Own Royal Regiment)			A Squadron, Royal Yeomanry				Y Squadron, Royal Wessex Yeomanry
Royal Gloucestershire Hussars			B Squadron, Wessex Volunteers	A and C Squadrons, Royal Wessex Yeomanry		C Squadron, Royal Wessex Yeomanry	
Royal 1st Devon Yeomanry	Royal Devon Yeomanry	Converted to artillery	A Squadron, Devonshire Territorials	D Squadron, Royal Wessex Yeomanry			
Royal North Devon Yeomanry	Royal Devon Yeomanry	Converted to artillery	A Squadron, Devonshire Territorials	D Squadron, Royal Wessex Yeomanry			

== Affiliations ==
- The Queen's Royal Hussars
- The King's Royal Hussars
- The Royal Tank Regiment
- HMS Portland

== Commanding officers ==
- 2003–2005: Lt Col The Lord de Mauley
- 2005–2007: Lt Col M.J.R. Rothwell
- 2007–2010: Lt Col R. Frampton-Hobbs
- 2010–2012: Lt Col R.B. Trant
- 2012–2015: Lt Col C. MacGregor
- 2015–2017: Lt Col J. Godfrey
- 2017–2020: Lt Col R.A. Burdon-Cooper
- 2020–2022: Lt Col C.J. Speers
- 2022–2025: Lt Col A.E. Sharman
- 2025–present: Lt Col E.D.L Hodges

== Honorary Colonels ==
- 1971–1984: Col The Duke of Beaufort
- 1984–1989: Maj The Baron Margadale
- 1989–1992: Maj Gen Sir Sir J.H.B. Acland
- 1992–1997: Gen Sir C.J. Waters
- 1997–2000: Col J.E. Baring Hills
- 2000–2003: Lt Col J.G. Peel
- 2003–2010: Maj Gen A.G. Denaro
- 2010–2015: Gen Sir A.R.D. Shirreff
- 2015–2022: Lt Col The Lord de Mauley
- 2022–present: S.A. Hart

== Order of precedence ==
For the purposes of parading, the Regiments of the British Army are listed according to an order of precedence. This is the order in which the various corps of the army parade, from right to left, with the unit at the extreme right being the most senior.

Preceded by Royal Yeomanry	British Army; Order of Precedence	Succeeded by Queen's Own Yeomanry
