= 4th Mounted Division =

4th Mounted Division 2nd Cyclist Division
- Active: 20 March 1916 – 16 November 1916
- Country: United Kingdom
- Branch: British Army
- Type: Yeomanry then Cyclist
- Size: Division
- Headquarters: Colchester then Ipswich
- Service: World War I

Commanders
- Notable commanders: Lord Lovat

The 4th Mounted Division was a short-lived Yeomanry Division of the British Army active during World War I. It was formed on 20 March 1916, converted to 2nd Cyclist Division in July 1916 and broken up on 16 November 1916. It remained in England on Home Defence duties throughout its existence.

== History ==
=== 4th Mounted Division ===
The 4th Mounted Division was formed on 20 March 1916 from three 2nd Line (Note: In accordance with the Territorial and Reserve Forces Act 1907 (7 Edw. 7, c.9) which brought the Territorial Force into being, the TF was intended to be a home defence force for service during wartime and members could not be compelled to serve outside the country. However, on the outbreak of war on 4 August 1914, many members volunteered for Imperial Service. Therefore, TF units were split into 1st Line (liable for overseas service) and 2nd Line (home service for those unable or unwilling to serve overseas) units. 2nd Line units performed the home defence role, although in fact most of these were also posted abroad in due course. Likewise, existing pre-war formations (brigades and divisions) formed duplicate 2nd Lines with the same structure as their 1st Line parents.) mounted brigades (2/1st Eastern, 2/1st South Eastern and 2/1st South Western) and the new 2/1st Southern Mounted Brigade. The Headquarters was at Colchester and Brigadier-General (Major-General from 26 May) Lord Lovat was appointed to command. The brigades were stationed at Wivenhoe, Canterbury, Kelvedon and Manningtree; they were numbered as 13th, 14th, 15th and 16th Mounted Brigades, respectively, on 31 March. Being formed relatively late, it did not appear to suffer the same organizational problems (lack of equipment and personnel) as other 2nd Line divisions, for example the 1st and 2/2nd Mounted Divisions.

=== 2nd Cyclist Division ===
In July 1916 there was a major reorganization of 2nd Line yeomanry units in the United Kingdom. All but 12 regiments were converted to cyclists: the rest were dismounted, handed over their horses to the remount depots and were issued with bicycles. The 4th Mounted Division was reorganized as the 2nd Cyclist Division, now commanding the 5th, 6th, 7th and 8th Cyclist Brigades. On reorganisation, 14th Mounted Brigade – with 2/1st Hertfordshire, 2/1st Queen's Own West Kent and 2/1st Essex Yeomanry – was posted to the new 1st Mounted Division (3rd Mounted Division redesignated) where it formed the new 3rd Mounted Brigade and remained mounted. In exchange, the 10th Mounted Brigade (2/1st South Midland) joined as the 8th Cyclist Brigade.

The Headquarters remained at Colchester and the brigades at Wivenhoe, Kelvedon, Manningtree and West Malling. It was assigned to the Southern Army, Home Defence Troops, and Lord Lovat remained in command. The Headquarters moved to Ipswich in September 1916 and the brigade were now at Wivenhoe, Wingham, Woodbridge and Ipswich.

A further reorganization in November 1916 saw the 2nd Cyclist Division broken up. The cyclist brigades were dispersed and the yeomanry regiments were amalgamated in pairs to form Yeomanry Cyclist Regiments in new cyclist brigades. The division had remained in England on Home Defence duties throughout its brief existence.

== Orders of battle ==
4th Mounted Division – 20 March 1916 to July 1916
13th Mounted Brigade (2/1st Eastern) (Note: 13th Mounted Brigade (2/1st Eastern) was reformed as 5th Cyclist Brigade in July 1916.): 2/1st Suffolk Yeomanry; 2/1st Norfolk Yeomanry; 2/1st Essex Yeomanry (Note: The 2/1st Essex Yeomanry and the 2/1st Hertfordshire Yeomanry joined the 2/1st Queen's Own West Kent Yeomanry in the 14th Mounted Brigade (2/1st South Eastern) in July 1916. They remained mounted and moved with the brigade to the new 1st Mounted Division.)	Signal Service: 13th Mounted Brigade Signal Troop; 14th Mounted Brigade Signal Troop; 15th Mounted Brigade Signal Troop; 16th Mounted Brigade Signal Troop; 4th Mounted Division Signal Squadron; Medical: 13th Mounted Brigade Field Ambulance, RAMC; 14th Mounted Brigade Field Ambulance, RAMC; 15th Mounted Brigade Field Ambulance, RAMC; 16th Mounted Brigade Field Ambulance, RAMC; 4th Mounted Division Train: 13th Mounted Brigade Transport and Supply Column, ASC; 14th Mounted Brigade Transport and Supply Column, ASC; 15th Mounted Brigade Transport and Supply Column, ASC; 16th Mounted Brigade Transport and Supply Column, ASC; 4th Mounted Division Company, ASC
14th Mounted Brigade (2/1st South Eastern) (Note: 14th Mounted Brigade (2/1st South Eastern) was renumbered as 3rd Mounted Brigade and transferred to the new 1st Mounted Division (3rd Mounted Division redesignated).): 2/1st Royal East Kent Yeomanry; 2/1st Queen's Own West Kent Yeomanry; 2/1st Sussex Yeomanry
15th Mounted Brigade (2/1st South Western) (Note: 15th Mounted Brigade (2/1st South Western) was reformed as 6th Cyclist Brigade in July 1916.): 2/1st Royal Wiltshire Yeomanry; 2/1st North Somerset Yeomanry; 2/1st Hampshire Yeomanry
16th Mounted Brigade (2/1st Southern) (Note: 16th Mounted Brigade (2/1st Southern) was reformed as 7th Cyclist Brigade in July 1916.): 2/1st Queen's Own Dorset Yeomanry; 2/1st Hertfordshire Yeomanry; 2/1st Surrey Yeomanry

2nd Cyclist Division – July 1916 to 16 November 1916
5th Cyclist Brigade (Note: 13th Mounted Brigade (2/1st Eastern) was redesignated as 5th Cyclist Brigade in July 1916. 2/1st Sussex Yeomanry of 14th Mounted Brigade (2/1st South Eastern) exchanged places with 2/1st Essex Yeomanry.): 2/1st Suffolk Yeomanry; 2/1st Norfolk Yeomanry; 2/1st Sussex Yeomanry; 1/8th (Cyclist) Battalion, Essex Regiment	Royal Horse Artillery: 2/1st Berkshire Royal Horse Artillery (Note: 2/1st Berkshire Royal Horse Artillery was attached to 7th Cyclist Brigade from September 1916 until the division was broken up.); 2/1st Nottinghamshire Royal Horse Artillery (Note: 2/1st Nottinghamshire Royal Horse Artillery was attached to 8th Cyclist Brigade from September 1916 until the division was broken up.); Signal Service: 5th Cyclist Brigade Signal Troop; 6th Cyclist Brigade Signal Troop; 7th Cyclist Brigade Signal Troop; 8th Cyclist Brigade Signal Troop; 2nd Cyclist Division Signal Squadron; Medical: 5th Cyclist Brigade Field Ambulance, RAMC; 6th Cyclist Brigade Field Ambulance, RAMC; 7th Cyclist Brigade Field Ambulance, RAMC; 8th Cyclist Brigade Field Ambulance, RAMC; 2nd Cyclist Division Train: 5th Cyclist Brigade Transport and Supply Column, ASC; 6th Cyclist Brigade Transport and Supply Column, ASC; 7th Cyclist Brigade Transport and Supply Column, ASC; 8th Cyclist Brigade Transport and Supply Column, ASC; 2nd Cyclist Division Company, ASC
6th Cyclist Brigade (Note: 15th Mounted Brigade (2/1st South Western) was redesignated as 6th Cyclist Brigade in July 1916.): 2/1st Royal Wiltshire Yeomanry; 2/1st North Somerset Yeomanry; 2/1st Hampshire Yeomanry; 2/1st Kent Cyclist Battalion
7th Cyclist Brigade (Note: 16th Mounted Brigade (2/1st Southern) was redesignated as 7th Cyclist Brigade in July 1916. 2/1st Royal East Kent Yeomanry of 14th Mounted Brigade (2/1st South Eastern) exchanged places with 2/1st Hertfordshire Yeomanry.): 2/1st Royal East Kent Yeomanry; 2/1st Queen's Own Dorset Yeomanry; 2/1st Surrey Yeomanry; 1/7th (Cyclist) Battalion, Devonshire Regiment
8th Cyclist Brigade (Note: 10th Mounted Brigade (2/1st South Midland) was transferred from 3rd Mounted Division in July 1916 and was redesignated as 8th Cyclist Brigade. 2/1st Berkshire Yeomanry of 11th Mounted Brigade (2/2nd South Midland) exchanged places with 2/1st Warwickshire Yeomanry.): 2/1st Royal Gloucestershire Hussars; 2/1st Berkshire Yeomanry; 2/1st Queen's Own Worcestershire Hussars; 2/8th (Cyclist) Battalion, Essex Regiment

== See also ==
- List of British divisions in World War I
- British yeomanry during the First World War
- Second line yeomanry regiments of the British Army

== Bibliography ==
- Becke, Archibald F. (1936). Order of Battle of Divisions Part 2A. The Territorial Force Mounted Divisions and the 1st-Line Territorial Force Divisions (42–56). London: HMSO. OCLC 4405016.
- James, Brigadier E.A. (1978). British Regiments 1914–18. London: Samson Books Limited. ISBN 0-906304-03-2.
- Rinaldi, Richard A (2008). Order of Battle of the British Army 1914. Takoma Park, Maryland: Tiger Lilly Books. ISBN 978-0-9776072-8-0.
