= List of British Army Yeomanry Regiments converted to Royal Artillery =

This is a list of British Army Yeomanry Regiments converted to Royal Artillery. In the aftermath of the First World War 25 Yeomanry regiments of the British Army were transferred to the Royal Artillery between 1920 and 1922 with another one – the City of London Yeomanry (Rough Riders) – reduced to a battery in another regiment. A further seven regiments were converted during the Second World War.

== Background ==
Under threat of invasion by the French Revolutionary government from 1793, and with insufficient military forces to repulse such an attack, the British government under William Pitt the Younger decided in 1794 to increase the Militia and to form corps of volunteers for the defence of the country. The mounted arm of the volunteers became known as the "Gentlemen and Yeomanry Cavalry". Despite the end of the Napoleonic Wars in 1815, the Yeomanry was retained by the government "for Military Service in aid of the Civil Power" in the absence of organised police forces.

The Yeomanry was not intended to serve overseas, but due to the string of defeats during Black Week in December 1899, the British government realized they were going to need more troops than just the regular army. A Royal Warrant was issued on 24 December 1899 to allow volunteer forces to serve in the Second Boer War. The Royal Warrant asked standing Yeomanry regiments to provide service companies of approximately 115 men each for the Imperial Yeomanry. In the aftermath of the war, a number of new regiments were formed and Haldane's Reforms resulted in a more effective reserve force for home defence. By the outbreak of the First World War, there were 55 regiments. (Note: Two more regiments were formed immediately after the outbreak of the First World War: the Welsh Horse and a third regiment of Scottish Horse.)

In accordance with the Territorial and Reserve Forces Act 1907 (7 Edw. 7, c.9) which brought the Territorial Force into being, the TF was intended to be a home defence force for service during wartime and members could not be compelled to serve outside the country. However, on the outbreak of war on 4 August 1914, many members volunteered for Imperial Service. Therefore, TF units were split in August and September 1914 into 1st Line (liable for overseas service) and 2nd Line (home service for those unable or unwilling to serve overseas) units. Later, a 3rd Line was formed to act as a reserve, providing trained replacements for the 1st and 2nd Line regiments. (Note: Therefore, the Yeomanry expanded to a total of 171 regiments during the war.)

The experience of the First World War made it clear that cavalry was surfeit. Indeed, by the end of the war, just 17 1st Line regiments remained as mounted cavalry; the rest had been converted to infantry or machine gun battalions. Almost all 2nd Line regiments were converted to cyclists in 1916 and 1917, and the 3rd Line regiments were absorbed into reserve cavalry regiments or reserve infantry battalions.

Post war, a commission was set up to consider the shape of the Territorial Force (Territorial Army from 1 October 1921). Only the 14 most senior regiments were retained as cavalry (Note: The 14 regiments retained as cavalry were: Royal Wiltshire Yeomanry; Warwickshire Yeomanry; Yorkshire Hussars; Sherwood Rangers Yeomanry; Staffordshire Yeomanry; Shropshire Yeomanry; Ayrshire (Earl of Carrick's Own) Yeomanry; Cheshire Yeomanry; Queen's Own Yorkshire Dragoons; Leicestershire Yeomanry; North Somerset Yeomanry; Duke of Lancaster's Own Yeomanry; Lanarkshire Yeomanry; Northumberland Hussars) (though the Lovat Scouts and the Scottish Horse were also to remain mounted as "scouts"). Eight regiments were converted to Armoured Car Companies of the Royal Tank Corps (RTC), (Note: The eight regiments converted to Armoured Car Companies of the Royal Tank Corps (RTC) were: Derbyshire Yeomanry; Royal Gloucestershire Hussars; Lothians and Border Horse; Fife and Forfar Yeomanry; Westminster Dragoons; 3rd County of London Yeomanry (Sharpshooters); Northamptonshire Yeomanry; East Riding Yeomanry) one was reduced to a battery in another regiment, one was absorbed into a local infantry battalion, one became a signals regiment and two were disbanded. (Note: The City of London Yeomanry (Rough Riders) was reduced to a battery in 11th (Honourable Artillery Company and City of London Yeomanry) Brigade, RHA (later re-established as a regiment), the Montgomeryshire Yeomanry was absorbed into the 7th Battalion, Royal Welch Fusiliers, the Middlesex Yeomanry became a signals regiment and the Lincolnshire Yeomanry and the Welsh Horse were disbanded.) The remaining 25 regiments were converted to brigades (Note: The basic organic unit of the Royal Artillery was, and is, the Battery. When grouped together they formed brigades, in the same way that infantry battalions or cavalry regiments were grouped together in brigades. At the outbreak of the First World War, a field artillery brigade of headquarters (4 officers, 37 other ranks), three batteries (5 and 193 each), and a brigade ammunition column (4 and 154) had a total strength just under 800 so was broadly comparable to an infantry battalion (just over 1,000) or a cavalry regiment (about 550). Like an infantry battalion, an artillery brigade was usually commanded by a Lieutenant-Colonel. Artillery brigades were redesignated as regiments in 1938.) of the Royal Field Artillery between 1920 and 1922.

== Regiments ==
Converted post-First World War
Yeomanry Regiment	Artillery Regiment
Bedfordshire Yeomanry	105th (Bedfordshire Yeomanry) Field Regiment, Royal Artillery; 52nd (Bedfordshire Yeomanry) Heavy Regiment, Royal Artillery from 1 November 1939
Bedfordshire Yeomanry	148th (Bedfordshire Yeomanry) Field Regiment, Royal Artillery
Berkshire Yeomanry	145th (Berkshire Yeomanry) Field Regiment, Royal Artillery
Royal Buckinghamshire Hussars	99th (Buckinghamshire Yeomanry) Field Regiment, Royal Artillery
Denbighshire Hussars	61st (Caernarvon & Denbigh Yeomanry) Medium Regiment, Royal Artillery
Denbighshire Hussars	69th (Caernarvon & Denbigh Yeomanry) Medium Regiment, Royal Artillery
Royal 1st Devon Yeomanry	96th (Royal Devon Yeomanry) Field Regiment, Royal Artillery
Royal 1st Devon Yeomanry	142nd (Royal Devon Yeomanry) Field Regiment, Royal Artillery
Queen's Own Dorset Yeomanry	94th (Queen's Own Dorset Yeomanry) Field Regiment, Royal Artillery
Queen's Own Dorset Yeomanry	141st (Queen's Own Dorset Yeomanry) Field Regiment, Royal Artillery
Royal East Kent Yeomanry (The Duke of Connaught's Own Mounted Rifles)	97th (Kent Yeomanry) Field Regiment, Royal Artillery
Royal East Kent Yeomanry (The Duke of Connaught's Own Mounted Rifles)	143rd (Kent Yeomanry) Field Regiment, Royal Artillery
Essex Yeomanry	104th (Essex Yeomanry) Regiment, Royal Horse Artillery
Essex Yeomanry	147th (Essex Yeomanry) Regiment, Royal Horse Artillery
Glamorgan Yeomanry	324 (Glamorgan Yeomanry) Battery, 81st (Welsh) Field Regiment, Royal Artillery
Queen's Own Royal Glasgow Yeomanry	54th (Queen’s Own Royal Glasgow Yeomanry) Anti-Tank Regiment, Royal Artillery
Queen's Own Royal Glasgow Yeomanry	64th (Queen's Own Royal Glasgow Yeomanry) Anti-Tank Regiment, Royal Artillery
Hampshire Yeomanry (Carabiniers)	95th (Hampshire Yeomanry) Brigade, Royal Field Artillery; 72nd (Hampshire) Heavy Anti-Aircraft Regiment, Royal Artillery from 1939
Hertfordshire Yeomanry	86th (East Anglian) (Hertfordshire Yeomanry) Field Regiment, Royal Artillery
Hertfordshire Yeomanry	135th (East Anglian) (Hertfordshire Yeomanry) Field Regiment, Royal Artillery
Hertfordshire Yeomanry	79th (Hertfordshire Yeomanry) Heavy Anti-Aircraft Regiment, Royal Artillery
Lancashire Hussars	106th (Lancashire Hussars) Regiment, Royal Horse Artillery
Lancashire Hussars	149th (Lancashire Hussars) Regiment, Royal Horse Artillery
City of London Yeomanry (Rough Riders)	11th (City of London Yeomanry) Light Anti-Aircraft Regiment, Royal Artillery
Norfolk Yeomanry (The King’s Own Royal Regt)	108th (Suffolk & Norfolk Yeomanry) Field Regiment, Royal Artillery; 55th (Suffolk & Norfolk Yeomanry) Anti-Tank Regiment, Royal Artillery from 1938; 65th (Norfolk Yeomanry) Anti-Tank Regiment, Royal Artillery from 1 September 1939
Royal North Devon Yeomanry	Amalgamated with Royal 1st Devon Yeomanry on conversion
Queen's Own Oxfordshire Hussars	Amalgamated with Queen's Own Worcestershire Hussars on conversion
Pembroke Yeomanry	102nd (Pembroke & Cardiganshire) Field Regiment, Royal Artillery
Pembroke Yeomanry	146th (Pembroke & Cardiganshire) Field Regiment, Royal Artillery
South Nottinghamshire Hussars	107th (South Nottinghamshire Hussars) Regiment, Royal Horse Artillery
South Nottinghamshire Hussars	150th (South Nottinghamshire Hussars) Regiment, Royal Horse Artillery
Suffolk Yeomanry (Duke of York's Own Loyal Suffolk Hussars)	Amalgamated with Norfolk Yeomanry on conversion, separated as 55th (Suffolk Yeomanry) Anti-Tank Regiment, Royal Artillery from 1 September 1939
Surrey Yeomanry (Queen Mary’s Regiment)	98th (Surrey & Sussex Yeomanry Queen Mary’s) Field Regiment, Royal Artillery
Surrey Yeomanry (Queen Mary’s Regiment)	144th (Surrey & Sussex Yeomanry Queen Mary’s) Field Regiment, Royal Artillery
Sussex Yeomanry	Amalgamated with Surrey Yeomanry on conversion
Westmorland and Cumberland Yeomanry	51st (Westmoreland and Cumberland Yeomanry) Field Regiment, Royal Artillery
Westmorland and Cumberland Yeomanry	109th (Westmoreland and Cumberland Yeomanry) Field Regiment, Royal Artillery
Queen's Own West Kent Yeomanry	Amalgamated with Royal East Kent Yeomanry on conversion
West Somerset Yeomanry	55th (Wessex) Field Regiment, Royal Artillery
West Somerset Yeomanry	112th (Wessex) Field Regiment, Royal Artillery
Queen's Own Worcestershire Hussars	53rd (Worcestershire and Oxfordshire Yeomanry) Anti-Tank Regiment, Royal Artillery
Queen's Own Worcestershire Hussars	63rd (Worcestershire and Oxfordshire Yeomanry) Anti-Tank Regiment, Royal Artillery

Converted during the Second World War
Yeomanry Regiment	Artillery Regiment
Ayrshire (Earl of Carrick's Own) Yeomanry	151st (Ayrshire Yeomanry) Field Regiment, Royal Artillery
Ayrshire (Earl of Carrick's Own) Yeomanry	152nd (Ayrshire Yeomanry) Field Regiment, Royal Artillery
Lanarkshire Yeomanry	155th (Lanarkshire Yeomanry) Field Regiment, Royal Artillery
Lanarkshire Yeomanry	156th (Lanarkshire Yeomanry) Field Regiment, Royal Artillery
Duke of Lancaster's Own Yeomanry	77th (Duke of Lancaster's Own Yeomanry) Medium Regiment, Royal Artillery
Duke of Lancaster's Own Yeomanry	78th (Duke of Lancaster's Own Yeomanry) Medium Regiment, Royal Artillery
Leicestershire Yeomanry (Prince Albert's Own)	153rd (Leicestershire Yeomanry) Field Regiment, Royal Artillery
Leicestershire Yeomanry (Prince Albert's Own)	154th (Leicestershire Yeomanry) Field Regiment, Royal Artillery
Northumberland Hussars	102nd (Northumberland Hussars) Light Anti-Aircraft/Anti-Tank Regiment, Royal Artillery
Scottish Horse	79th (Scottish Horse Yeomanry) Medium Regiment, Royal Artillery
Scottish Horse	80th (Scottish Horse Yeomanry) Medium Regiment, Royal Artillery
Shropshire Yeomanry	75th (Shropshire Yeomanry) Medium Regiment, Royal Artillery
Shropshire Yeomanry	76th (Shropshire Yeomanry) Medium Regiment, Royal Artillery

Yeomanry gunners in the Second World War
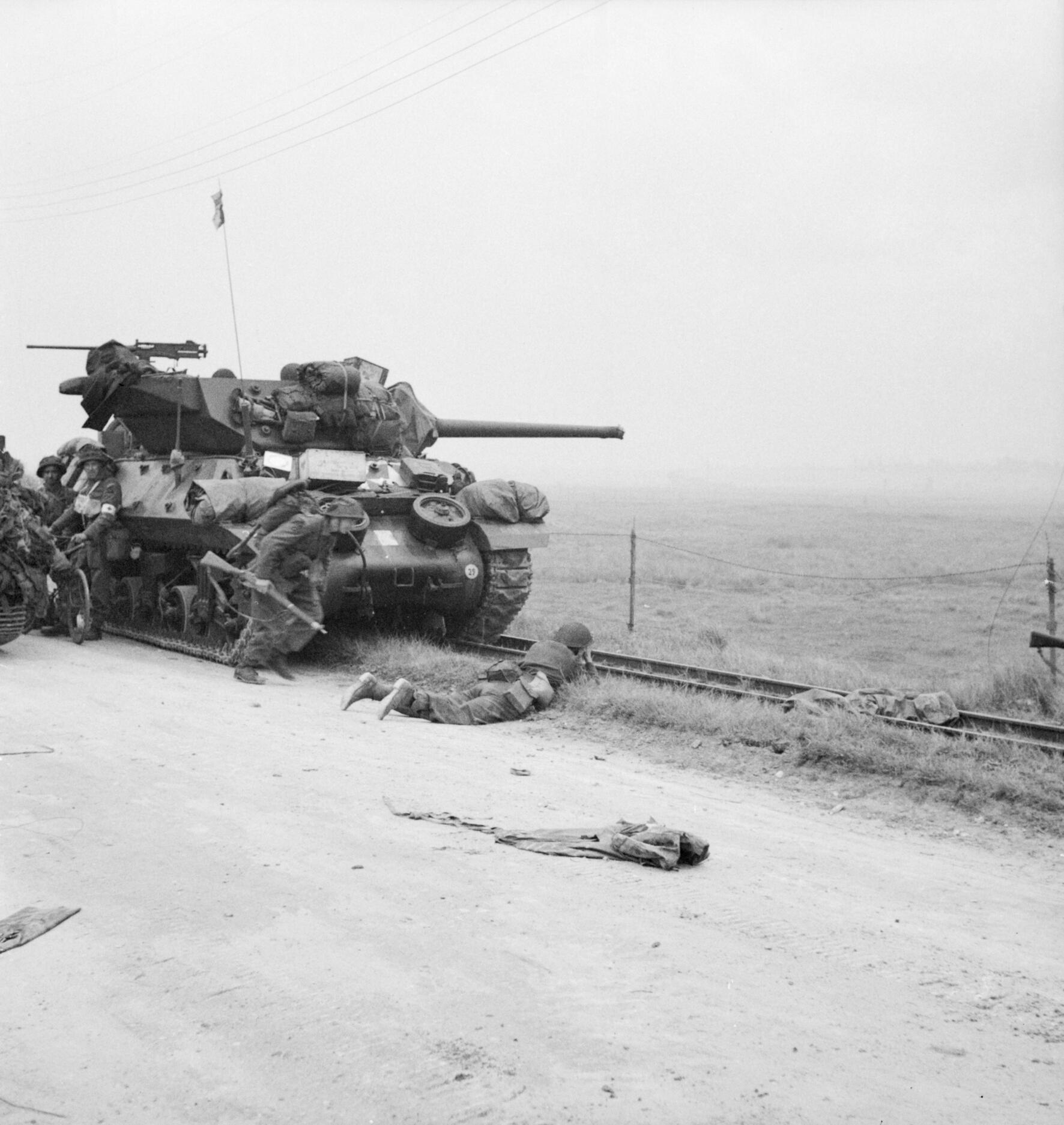
Troops take shelter near an M10 tank destroyer, used by 102nd (Northumberland Hussars) Anti-Tank Regiment, Royal Artillery, 6 June 1944

25 pounders of 430th Battery, 55th (Wessex) Field Regiment, Royal Artillery, near Hechtel in Belgium, firing in support of Guards Armoured Division in the bridgehead over the Maas-Schelde (Meuse-Escaut) Canal, 16 September 1944

25 pounders of 430th Battery, 55th Field Regiment (West Somerset Yeomanry), near Hechtel in Belgium, firing in support of Guards Armoured Division in the bridgehead over the Maas-Schelde (Meuse-Escaut) Canal, 16 September 1944

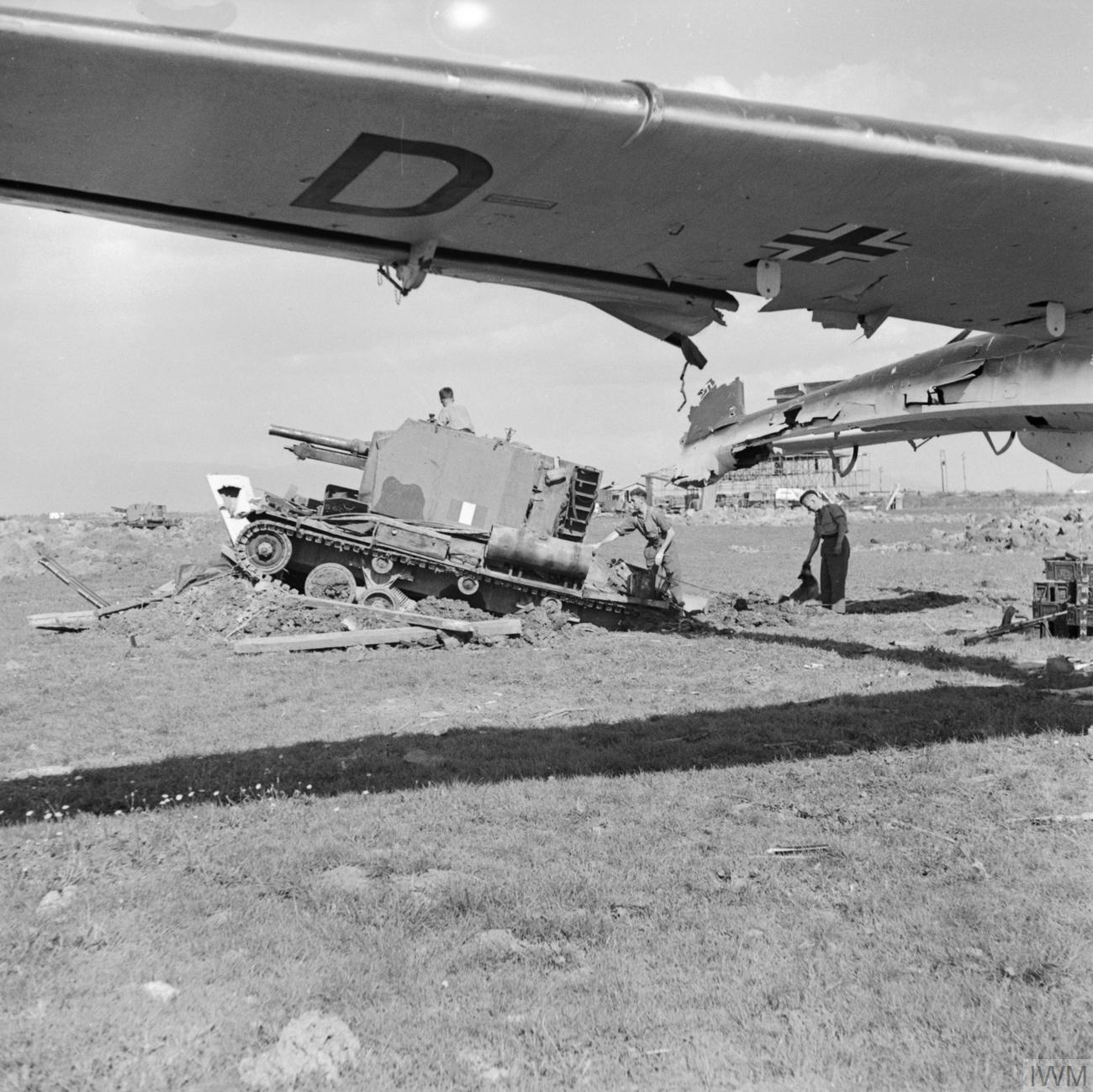
A battery of 142nd (Royal Devon Yeomanry) Field Regiment, Royal Artillery Bishops at a former German airfield in Sicily, October 1943

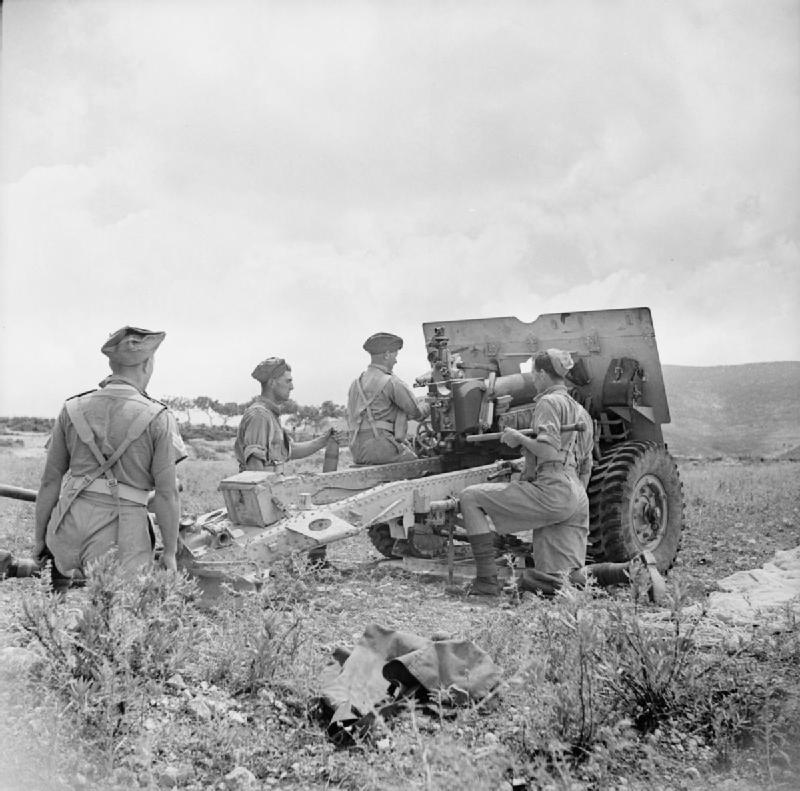
A 25 pounder field gun of 153rd (Leicestershire Yeomanry) Field Regiment, Royal Artillery during a practice shoot, June 1943

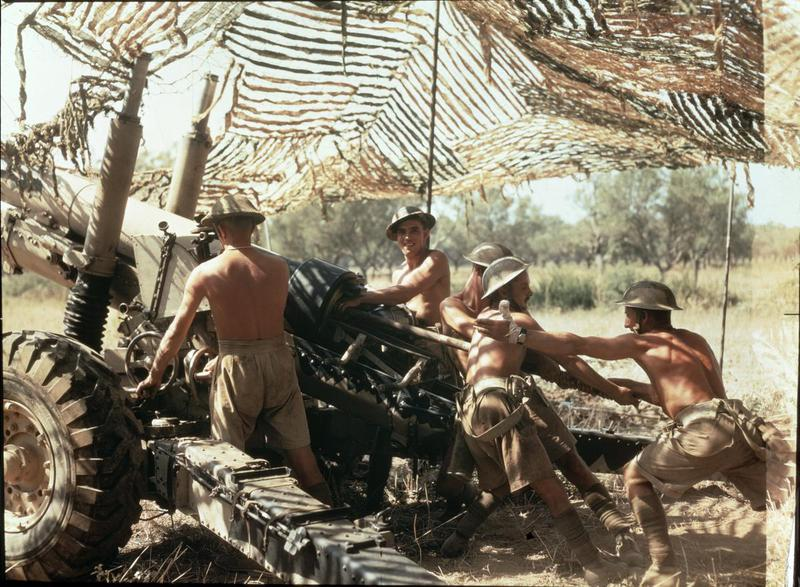
Shropshire Yeomanry in action in Italy with a 5.5-inch Medium Gun, 1943

== See also ==
- List of Yeomanry Regiments 1908
- Yeomanry
- Yeomanry order of precedence

== Bibliography ==
- James, Brigadier E.A. (1978). British Regiments 1914–18. London: Samson Books Limited. ISBN 0-906304-03-2.
- Mileham, Patrick (1994). The Yeomanry Regiments; 200 Years of Tradition. Edinburgh: Canongate Academic. ISBN 1-898410-36-4.
- Rinaldi, Richard A (2008). Order of Battle of the British Army 1914. Ravi Rikhye. ISBN 978-0-97760728-0.
