= Queen's Own Worcestershire Hussars =

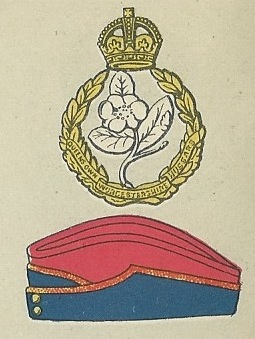
- Badge and service cap as worn at the outbreak of World War II
- Active: 1794–Present
- Country: Kingdom of Great Britain (1794–1800); United Kingdom (1801–present)
- Branch: Army Reserve
- Type: Yeomanry
- Size: Regiment [World Wars] Two Squadrons [Present day]
- Part of: Royal Armoured Corps; Royal Signals
- Battle honours: World War II; No battle honours were awarded. It is tradition within artillery units that the Regiment's guns represent its colours and battle honours.

The Queen's Own Worcestershire Hussars was a Yeomanry regiment of the British Army. First raised in 1794, it participated in the Second Boer War and World War I as horsed cavalry before being converted to an anti-tank regiment of the Royal Artillery for service in World War II. In 1956, it was amalgamated with the Warwickshire Yeomanry to form the Queen's Own Warwickshire and Worcestershire Yeomanry. The lineage is maintained by B (Staffordshire, Warwickshire and Worcestershire Yeomanry) Squadron, part of The Royal Yeomanry.

== French Revolutionary and Napoleonic Wars ==
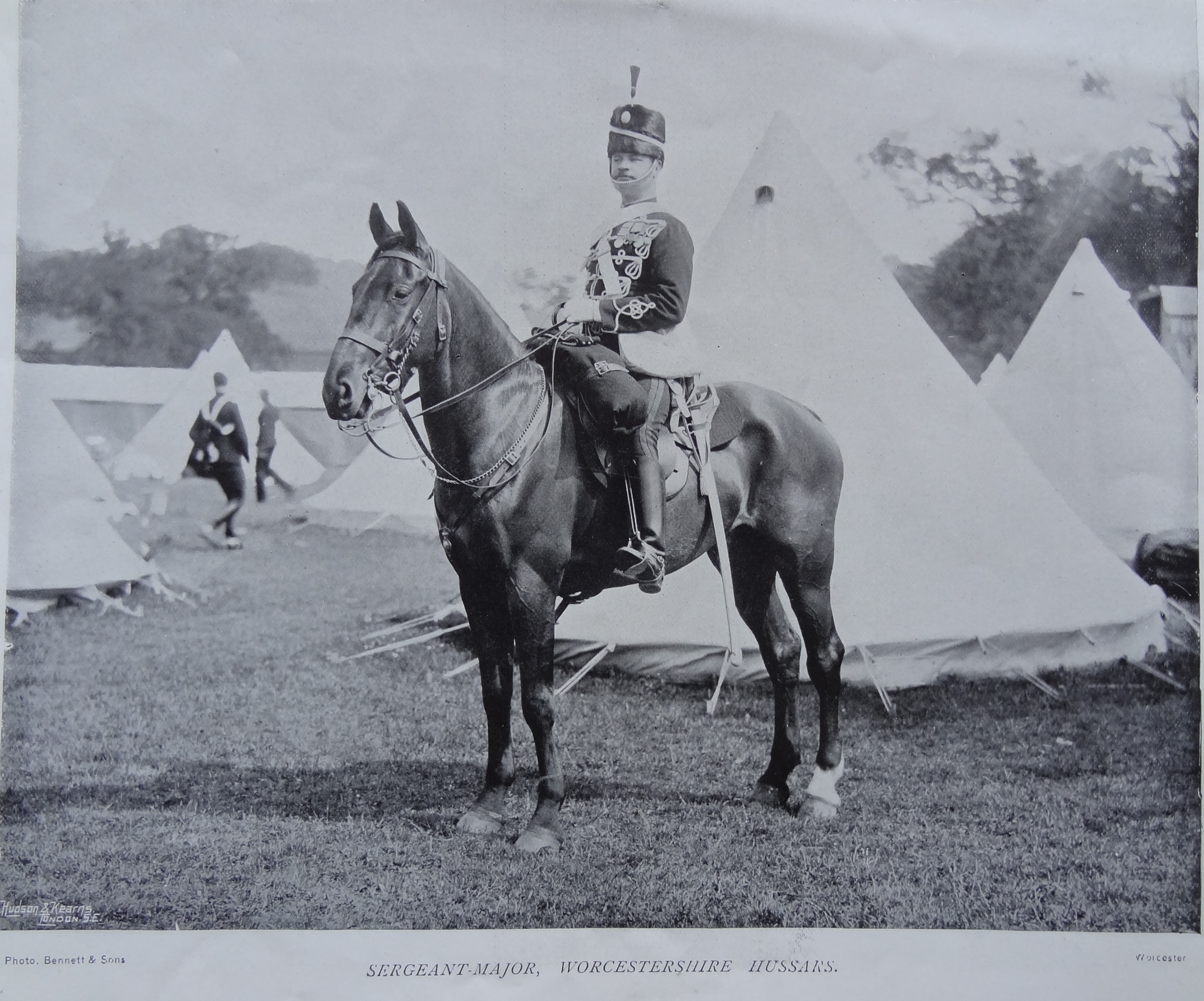
Worcestershire Yeomanry 1890s

The Queen's Own Worcestershire Hussars were formed in 1794, as the Worcestershire Yeomanry, when King George III was on the throne, William Pitt the Younger was the prime minister of Great Britain, and across the English Channel, Britain was faced by a French nation that had recently guillotined its king and possessed a revolutionary army numbering half a million men. The Prime Minister proposed on 14 March 1794 that the counties form a force of Volunteer Yeomanry Cavalry, which could be called on by the king to defend the country against invasion or by the lord lieutenant to subdue any civil disorder within the country.

Worcestershire responded quickly to this call: a meeting held on 29 April at the Guildhall in Worcester voted to raise money to augment the existing militia and to raise a corps of yeomanry cavalry. A further meeting on 15 August resolved to raise two yeomanry troops of 56 men each. This offer of service having been accepted, the Hon. John Somers Cocks was appointed captain and Thomas Spooner as lieutenant of the first troop, the Worcester Troop of Gentlemen and Yeomen, which held its first parade in front of the Unicorn Inn at Worcester on 25 October and began drilling at Powick. The second troop was raised in the summer of 1796 under the command of Spooner, and Capt Somers Cocks was promoted to major to command what was now a squadron. A further Act of Parliament in 1798 permitted local associations to raise additional troops of volunteer cavalry, whose service was restricted to operations within their county.

With the threat of a French invasion having receded after the signing of the Peace of Amiens in 1802, the King commended the Worcestershire Yeomanry for their 'honourable distinction in forming an essential part of the defence of the country against a foreign enemy in circumstances of extraordinary emergency'. However, the Worcester Yeomanry volunteered to serve on, and in the event the peace broke down in 1803. By the end of that year, a third troop had been added to the Worcester Cavalry and Maj Somers Cocks had been promoted to lieutenant-colonel to command the regiment, while seven troops of volunteer cavalry had been raised in the county:

- Worcester Cavalry (3 Trps)
- Bromsgrove Cavalry (23 May 1798)
- Dudley Cavalry
- Kidderminster Cavalry (15 November 1802)
- Kings Norton Cavalry
- Stourbridge Cavalry (2 Trps, 6 November 1802, 14 September 1803)
- Wolverley Cavalry

The Yeomanry's training was now carried out with Regular cavalry units whenever possible. During the 1810 training, rioting broke out in Worcester and the Yeomanry were called upon to assist the militia in quelling it. Lord Somers (as Lt-Col Somers Cocks had now become) resigned the command in 1811 and there was a two-year hiatus before his son, the Hon. John Somers Cocks was appointed lieutenant-colonel. In October 1811, the lords lieutenant were required to incorporate the independent Volunteer cavalry into the Yeomanry, who were to train for 12 days a year, receiving Regular cavalry pay while training.

== 19th Century ==
After the Battle of Waterloo, the remaining Volunteers were disbanded and the Yeomanry allowed to stand down if they wished, but most regiments, including the Worcestershires, volunteered to serve on. In 1818, the Worcestershire Yeomanry were called out to quell a disturbance in Pitchcroft, Worcester, where rioters were pulling down buildings that had been erected on common land, and the special constables had failed to intervene. The Yeomanry were met with a shower of stones and were glad to retire to the yard of the Star and Garter inn, after which the rioters dispersed peaceably. The regiment was also called out in 1822 during unrest amongst the South Staffordshire miners.

The War Office ceased to support the Yeomanry after 1827 and most regiments were disbanded, including the Worcestershires. However, further civil disorder led to the reconstitution of many of these regiments in 1831. The Worcestershire magistrates decided to reform their regiment and it was accepted by the government on 29 April 1831, with the Earl of Plymouth as colonel and Lord Lyttelton as lt-col. The adjutant was Capt William Emmott, who had enlisted as a Trooper in the Royal Horse Guards, had served with it in the Napoleonic Wars and at Waterloo, and has retire as the regiment's quartermaster. The regiment consisted of ten 50-man troops:

- Worcester
- Upton
- Stourbridge
- Kidderminster
- Northfield or Kings Norton
- Droitwich or Westfield
- Tardebigge
- Hanbury
- Bromsgrove
- Pershore and Evesham

The regiment also had two 3-pounder 'galloper guns' attached to it (replaced by 6-pounders in 1853).

During its first year, the regiment was called out to deal with riots at Upton, Tewkesbury and Worcester, by miners at Dudley when the entire regiment was deployed, and riots at Dudley and Stourbridge in connection with the Great Reform Act. The regiment raised an additional 100-man squadron at Dudley in 1832: mounted entirely on grey horses was known as the 'Grey Squadron'. In November 1832, Princess Victoria visited the Earl of Plymouth at Hewell Grange, for which the regiment provided her escort. After her accession as Queen Victoria in 1837 she conferred the title of 'Queen's Own' on the regiment in recognition of that visit: from now on the regiment bore the title of Queen's Own Regiment of Worcestershire Yeomanry.

The Earl of Plymouth died in 1833 and on 9 November was succeeded as colonel by his brother-in-law, Major the Hon. Robert Clive, who continued to support the regiment financially. The Kidderminster Troop was disbanded in 1836, but most of its members joined the Kings Norton Troop, which became a squadron. A new troop was raised at Witley in 1841.

The regiment continued to be called out to assist the civil powers, in 1832 during a boat hauliers' strike; at Dudley in 1833, 1834 and 1835; for six weeks' duty during the Chartist riots at Birmingham in 1839; and from April to September 1842 during the Staffordshire Potteries and South Staffordshire miners' riots. Of this service the Commanding Officer (CO) stated:

Prevention is the cure we should look to; we do not wish to be called into activity to cause injury to our neighbours, especially circumstanced as we are, and locally known to many of them.

Colonel Clive died in 1854 and Lord Ward (later Earl of Dudley), who had been lt-col since 1837, was promoted to replace him. Edwin Hughes served as Sergeant-Instructor with the Worcestershire Yeomanry starting from the day after his discharge from the 13th Hussars until his discharge for 'old age' on 5 January 1886. Edwin Hughes was the oldest survivor of the Charge of the Light Brigade.

In 1871, control of the yeomanry was taken from the lords lieutenant and passed to the Secretary of State for War; in the Worcestershires, the Earl of Dudley and 12 other officers resigned their commissions as a result. However, the Earl remained as Honorary Colonel of the regiment; Lt-Col Lord Sandys, formerly of the 2nd Life Guards, succeeded as CO. The regiment was reorganised as follows:

- A Trp at Stourbridge
- B Trp at Tardebigge
- C Trp at Dudley
- D Tp at Witley
- E Trp at Upton
- F Trp at Upton
- G Trp at Droitwich
- H Trp at Worcester

The gun detachment was disbanded and the regiment adopted a Hussar uniform. In 1887, during Queen Victoria's golden jubilee, the regiment's title was changed to Queen's Own Worcestershire Hussars. G and H Troops amalgamated to form a squadron and a new troop was raised at Malvern, amalgamating with one of the Upton troops. Lord Sandys resigned the command in 1878 and Lord Lyttelton (later Viscount Cobham) was promoted to replace him. He was succeeded by Lord Windsor in 1893.

Following the Cardwell Reforms, a mobilisation scheme began to appear in the Army List from December 1875. This assigned Regular and Yeomanry units places in an order of battle of corps, divisions and brigades for the 'Active Army', even though these formations were entirely theoretical, with no staff or services assigned. The Worcestershire, Derbyshire and Denbighshire Yeomanry were assigned to the Cavalry Brigade of VI Corps based at Crewe, alongside a Regular Army Royal Horse Artillery battery. This was never more than a paper organisation, but from April 1893 the Army List showed the Yeomanry regiments grouped into brigades for collective training. They were commanded by the senior regimental commanding officer but they did have a Regular Army Brigade major. The Worcestershire Yeomanry together with the Shropshire Yeomanry formed the 5th Yeomanry Brigade. The Yeomanry brigades disappeared from the Army List after the Second Boer War.

Under an Army Order of 22 January 1893, the yeomanry were organised by squadrons:

- A Squadron at Dudley
- B Squadron at Bromsgrove
- C Squadron at Malvern
- D Squadron at Worcester.

== Imperial Yeomanry ==
=== Second Boer War ===
In 1899, they were called for service in the Imperial Yeomanry, for the Boer War. The War Office was not prepared for the Boer offensive and sent only 10,000 Indian troops, under command of Lord Methuen, to face some 70,000 Boers. After an initial success, the British found themselves in trouble owing to lack of cavalry. The result was the English Yeomanry Regiments were called upon and their response was immediate. Lord Windsor, the Commanding Officer asked for volunteers for a newly formed Imperial Yeomanry Cavalry and was able to select 129 men from the 3,021 men who offered their services.

The Worcestershire contingent formed the 16th Company of the 5th Battalion, Imperial Yeomanry Cavalry under the command of Colonel Frederick Meyrick. The squadron's orders were to protect the railways, pacify the local Boer farmers and to capture the Boer forces their supplies, arms and equipment. The Regiment was armed with the Martini–Henry carbine and 2 lb and 3 lb guns which were, in fact, the private property of Lord Plymouth and paid for out of private funds. The Countess of Dudley, whose husband had been Colonel Commander of the Worcestershire Yeomanry, presented each yeoman with a pear blossom, the emblem of Worcestershire, worked in silk, to wear in their hat as a reminder of where they were from. When they returned in 1903, the Countess presented the regiment with a sprig of pear blossom made by Fabergé, in gold, diamond, rock crystal, and jade, which the unit still bring out on dinner nights.

A second draft for the IY went out to South Africa in 1901, including the 102nd (Worcestershire) Company. The Second Boer War ended in June 1902 and the Regiment returned to home having lost 16 NCOs killed in action and 20 wounded.

The Imperial Yeomanry was equipped and trained as Mounted infantry. The experiment was considered a success and, in 1901, all the existing yeomanry regiments were converted to IY: the regiment became the Worcestershire Imperial Yeomanry (The Queen's Own Worcestershire Hussars). The 'Imperial' part of the title was dropped when the yeomanry were transferred to the Territorial Force (TF) in 1908. The regiment was based at Silver Street in Worcester at this time (since demolished).

== World War I ==
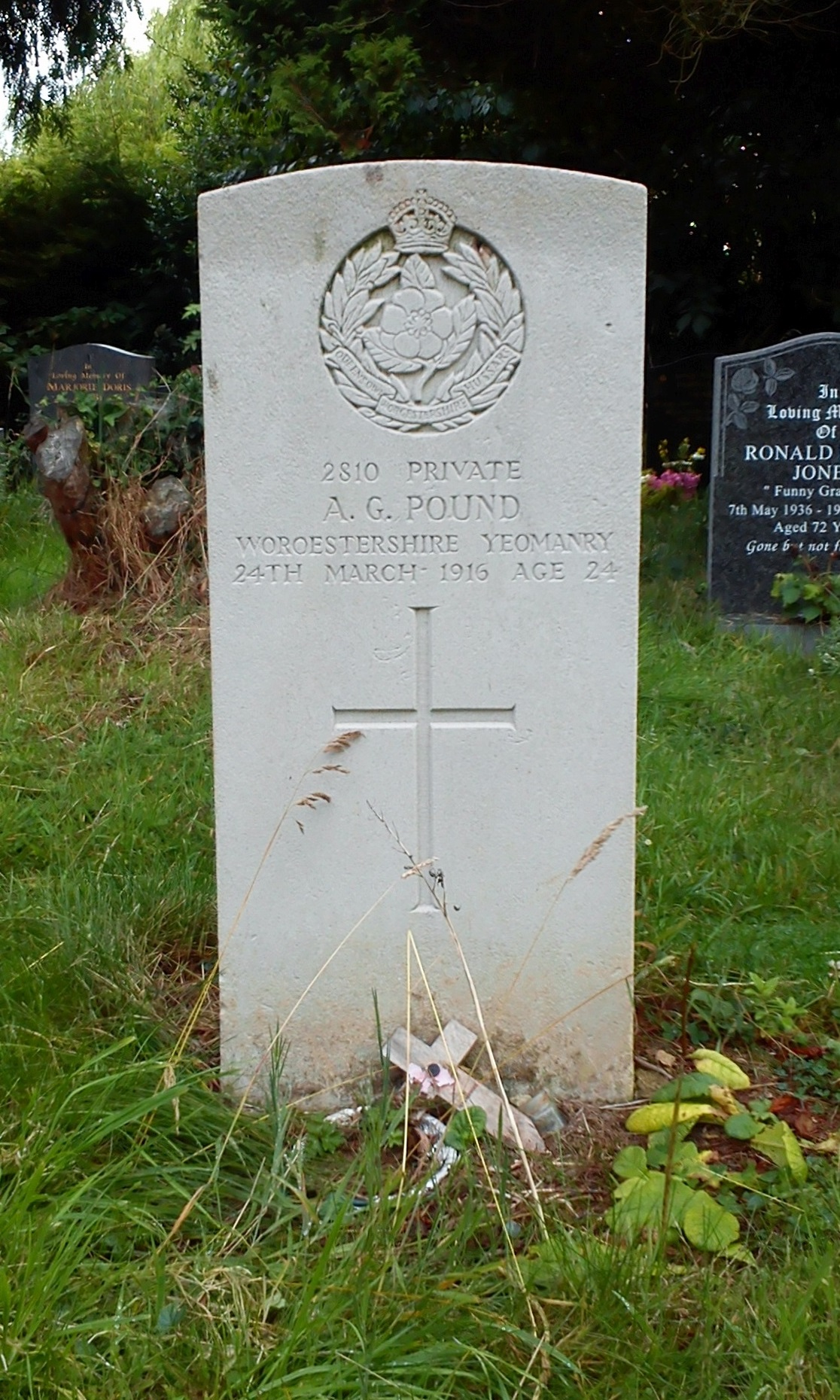
Ombersley: headstone for A.G. Pound, Worcestershire Yeomanry

In accordance with the Territorial and Reserve Forces Act 1907 (7 Edw. 7, c.9), which brought the Territorial Force into being, the TF was intended to be a home defence force for service during wartime and members could not be compelled to serve outside the country. However, on the outbreak of war on 4 August 1914, many members volunteered for Imperial Service. Therefore, TF units were split in August and September 1914 into 1st Line (liable for overseas service) and 2nd Line (home service for those unable or unwilling to serve overseas) units. Later, a 3rd Line was formed to act as a reserve, providing trained replacements for the 1st and 2nd Line regiments.

=== 1/1st Queen's Own Worcestershire Hussars ===
The Earl of Dudley, who took command of the Worcestershire Yeomanry Cavalry in November 1913, was already convinced that another European war was approaching. He appointed a permanent staff of instructors who trained the Regiment in musketry.

War was declared in August 1914 and the Worcestershires formed part of the 1st South Midland Mounted Brigade commanded by Brigadier E.A. Wiggin. The Brigade was ordered to Egypt and was based in Chatby Camp, close to Alexandria, by April 1915.

In August, the Brigade were informed they were to fight as infantry, and were sent to Suvla Bay, and took part in the Gallipoli campaign. The Regiment were in support of the Anzacs and other British soldiers, in an attempt to break through the Turkish defences. These Turkish defences on the hills overlooking the beaches proved too strong and Gallipoli was evacuated in January 1916.

The Regiment was sent to Egypt, where their casualties were replaced by fresh troops from England and the Regiment was sent to protect the eastern side of the Suez Canal. The Regiment dug wells and sent out patrols for reconnaissance to establish the location of the Turkish attack, the Regiment being responsible for patrolling the whole of the Qatia water area. The small isolated garrison at Oghratine had been ordered to protect a party of engineers on a well-digging expedition, when at dawn on 23 April 1916, 3,000 Turkish troops, including a machine gun battery of 12 guns, attacked. The defending troops repulsed the first attack but were forced back by the weight of the onslaught. The defenders' only machine gun was put out of action early in the attack and all the gunners were killed or wounded.

The victorious Turkish troops then advanced to reinforce the attack taking place against the small garrison at Qatia. Qatia fell to the Turkish forces with the loss of all of the Yeomanry's officers except a Major W.H. Wiggin who was wounded and managed to withdraw with about half the squadron. Anzac troops, who occupied both Qatia and Oghradine four days later, testified to the ferocity of the battle and paid tribute to the valour and tenacity of the defenders. In these actions, 9 officers and 102 NCOs and men of the Regiment were killed and many other wounded. A composite regiment, including the Worcestershire Yeomanry, was formed in August 1916 and together with Anzac regiments were tasked to force back some 48,000 Turks from Romani, a strategically important and fortified watering hole which was identified as the Turkish base for a major attack on the Suez Canal. After a fierce battle, the Turkish forces were forced to retreat and large numbers of guns were captured.

The Turkish army regrouped at Gaza and made a stand which brought the British advance to a halt until the arrival of General Edmund Allenby, who reorganised the army and allowed them to conduct operations towards the Turkish positions at Beersheba. The resulting operation took the Turkish forces by surprise and they were forced to withdraw.

In the pursuit that followed, the Worcestershire Yeomanry with the Warwickshire Yeomanry took part in the last cavalry charge on guns in British Military history, the Charge at Huj. Under Colonel Hugh Cheape the cavalry charged a group of Turkish guns at a place called Huj in November 1917. This action, in defence of the beleaguered 60th London Division, who were pinned down by Turkish fire, succeeded forcing them to withdraw and resulted in the capture of the guns. Yeomanry losses were heavy. Two out of nine officers were killed and four wounded and of 96 NCOs and men 17 were killed and 35 wounded.

=== 2/1st Queen's Own Worcestershire Hussars ===
The 2nd Line regiment was formed at Worcester in September 1914. In April 1915, it joined the 2/1st South Midland Mounted Brigade at Cirencester and in June moved to King's Lynn where the brigade joined the 2/2nd Mounted Division. In July 1915, the regiment was at Holkham Hall. On 31 March 1916, the remaining Mounted Brigades were ordered to be numbered in a single sequence; the brigade was numbered as 10th Mounted Brigade and the division as 3rd Mounted Division.

In July 1916, the regiment was converted to a cyclist unit in 8th Cyclist Brigade, 2nd Cyclist Division and was stationed at Tunbridge Wells. In November 1916, the division was broken up and regiment was merged with the 2/1st Royal Gloucestershire Hussars to form 12th (Gloucestershire and Worcestershire) Yeomanry Cyclist Regiment in 4th Cyclist Brigade at Ipswich. In March 1917, it resumed its identity as 2/1st Queen's Own Worcestershire Hussars. In April 1917, it moved to Wivenhoe, by November at Frinton and then to Manningtree. About April 1918 the regiment moved to Ireland and was stationed at Dublin where it remained, still in 4th Cyclist Brigade, until the end of the war.

=== 3/1st Queen's Own Worcestershire Hussars ===
The 3rd Line regiment was formed in 1915; in the summer it was affiliated to a Reserve Cavalry Regiment at Tidworth. In the summer of 1916 it was affiliated to the 4th Reserve Cavalry Regiment, still at Tidworth. Early in 1917, it was absorbed into the 5th Reserve Cavalry Regiment, also at Tidworth.

== Between the Wars ==
The Regiment returned from Palestine in 1919, under strength, but was quickly reformed and brought up to strength. It had become clear during the war that cavalry was obsolete and, in 1922, it was announced that the Worcestershires were to serve as two horsed batteries in the Royal Field Artillery (RFA): 397 at Worcester and 398 at King's Heath, Birmingham. Together with 399 and 400 batteries from the Queen's Own Oxfordshire Hussars they formed 100th (Worcestershire and Oxfordshire Yeomanry) Brigade, RFA. The horses were replaced by artillery tractors in 1922. In 1924, the RFA was subsumed into the Royal Artillery (RA), and the unit was redesignated as an 'Army Field Brigade, RA', serving as 'Army Troops' in 48th (South Midland) Divisional Area.

As the British Army rearmed in the years before World War II, the 100th Field Brigade was converted on 28 November 1938 to the anti-tank role as 53rd (Worcestershire and Oxfordshire Yeomanry) Anti-Tank Regiment, RA (RA 'brigades' being redesignated 'regiments' at this time). The two QOWH batteries were renumbered as 209 (at Kidderminster) and 210 (at King's Heath) (Queen's Own Worcestershire Hussars Yeomanry) A/T Btys. Its 18-pounders were replaced with 2-pounders. After the Munich Crisis, the TA was doubled in size: the Worcester Yeomanry batteries remained with the 53rd and expanded to four (209 at Kidderminster, 210 and 211 at King's Heath and 212 at Bewdley), and the QOOH batteries formed a new 63rd A/T Rgt. Both were officially titled 'Worcestershire and Oxfordshire Yeomanry', taking no account of the actual split.

== World War II ==
=== Battle of France ===
The Regiment was part of the 48th (South Midland) Infantry Division and went with the division in January 1940 to join the British Expeditionary Force (BEF) on the border between France and Belgium. On 10 May 1940, the German Army's attack started and the BEF moved forwards across the Belgian frontier to take position on the River Dyle. Lord Gort, commanding the entire BEF, was aware of the possibility of a northward retreat to the coast and used the 48th Division to cover the 28 miles of the La Bassee Canal.

Their purpose was to protect the western flank of the BEF by holding strongpoints such as canal crossings. Large enemy losses were inflicted by the 210 Battery together with troops of the 211 in support of the 2nd Battalion, Royal Warwickshire Regiment (of 144th Infantry Brigade) who were holding the town of Wormhoudt. These same troops were later involved in the Wormhoudt massacre.

Orders were received from Brigade to destroy their guns and vehicles and proceed to Dunkirk. Near Oost-Cappell the 212 Battery defended the crossroads against German tanks, some of which were destroyed, until being forced to withdraw after disabling their guns and vehicles. Each battery had been ordered to escape to Dunkirk, but only five officers and 284 men of the Regiment were evacuated from the beaches of Dunkirk in Operation Dynamo. The Regiment had, however, gained the distinction of having destroyed more enemy tanks than any other anti-tank Regiment of the BEF.

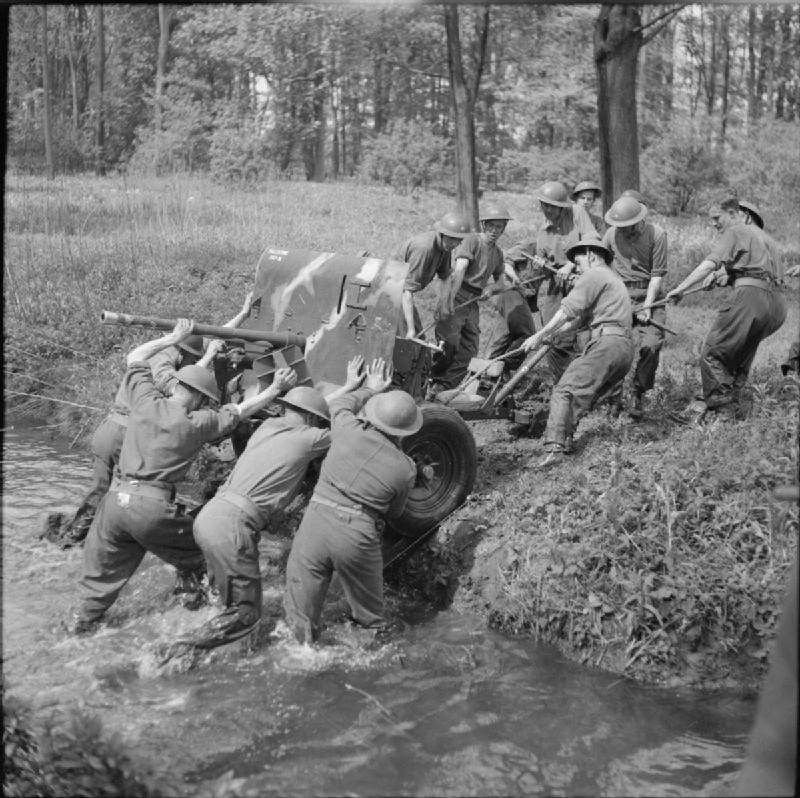
Men of 53rd Anti-Tank Regiment, Royal Artillery, manhandle a 2 Pounder Anti-Tank gun across a stream near Thirsk in Yorkshire, 26 May 1942. (IWM H20128)

=== Home Defence ===
On 28 July 1941, while stationed at Newton Abbot, Devon, the regiment provided the cadre of experienced gunners for a new 290 A/T Bty. In October 1941 the regiment was transferred to 42nd (East Lancashire) Infantry Division, which was being converted into an armoured division. That month 209 A/T Bty transferred to a new 84th A/T Rgt that was being formed, and the new 290 A/T Bty left to join 56th (King's Own) A/T Rgt, leaving 53rd with just three batteries until it formed a new 331 A/T Bty on 25 June 1943. 42nd Armoured Division was broken up in October 1943, when the regiment moved to 6th Airborne Division, at first as an A/T regiment, then from 3 November as a light field regiment designated 53rd (Worcestershire Yeomanry) Air Landing Light Regiment, RA, and was now part of the British Army's airborne forces, with 210, 211 and 212 A/L Btys (331 Bty was disbanded on 6 December).

=== D-Day ===
Owing to a shortage of gliders, only 211 Battery participated in the British airborne assault on D-Day, 6 June 1944. Together with the 6th Airborne Division, they were tasked to seize and hold the high wooded area behind the city of Caen, which would see very heavy fighting during the Battle for Caen in the weeks to come, on the eastern flank of the Normandy bridgehead. 211 Battery landed near Caen in 27 gliders on 6 June.

The Regiment's other Batteries, 210 and 212, were sent to Normandy on Empire Capulet, which had been pressed into service as a troopship. They landed by sea at Luc-sur-Mer, on 14 June and joined up with 211 the following day; the complete Regiment going into action on 15 June. The Regiment now manned a series of Forward Observation Posts providing information for the Parachute and Commando Brigades against German mortar strongpoints. By 16 August, reports were received that the Germans were pulling out eastwards.

Major-General Richard Nelson Gale, General Officer Commanding the 6th Airborne Division, received orders that his command, together with the Regiment, was to maintain pressure on the retreating Germans on the coastal route towards the Seine in Operation Paddle. Progress was slow but the Regiment reached Honfleur on 27 August. They then returned to England to rest and reform for future airborne operations with the rest of the 6th Airborne Division.

On 20 December 1944, the Regiment received orders to embark for France again and by 26 December they were in action near Dinant in support of the 6th Airlanding Brigade, as the Americans and British defended against the German offensive in the Ardennes. The Regiment's 210 Battery claimed to be the first to land shells over the frontier on German soil.

=== Operation Varsity ===
In March 1945, the plan for Operation Varsity was to drop two Airborne divisions (the British 6th and US 17th), including the Regiment, behind enemy lines north of Wesel, isolate the industrial Ruhr and disrupt the German rear defences. On 24 March, 78 gliders set off from England for a successful attack that established bridgeheads on the eastern bank of the Rhine.

The first guns were in action within 10 minutes of the gliders landing. By the evening, all of the divisions' objectives had been taken but 2 Battery Commanders and 20 Other Ranks had been killed, with 8 officers and 59 men missing or prisoners of war. The advance continued and six weeks later they reached the Baltic coast.

The Regiment had fought in and captured the towns of Greven, Lengerich, Osnabrück, Minden and Lahder. Heavy German resistance was encountered near Celle on 15 April, when German self-propelled guns caused problems for 6th Airborne until they were outflanked after heavy shelling by the Regiment. The advance of the Regiment met with the Russian Army westward advance on 30 April, on the Baltic Coast at Wismar.

=== Palestine ===
The Regiment had returned to England by 23 May and was then ordered in September 1945 to Palestine. Its task was to help establish and maintain security in the Jewish state against Arab hostility and internal Jewish battles for power. The Regiment retrained as infantry to act as a police force, controlling and searching traffic along the north to south roads into Jerusalem, Tel Aviv and Jaffa. Their largest operation was to search Tel Aviv in three days, arresting men suspected of subversive activities and discovering hidden dumps of arms.

== Postwar ==
The Regiment was to change its title to the 33rd Airborne Light Regiment (Worcestershire Yeomanry), RA, just prior to the Regiment's posting in January 1948 to Schleswig-Holstein in Germany. However the Worcestershire Yeomanry had already been reborn in 1947 in Kidderminster as the 300th (Worcestershire Yeomanry) Anti-Tank Regiment, RA. It was equipped with six-pounder anti-tank guns and later 17-pounder self-propelled guns. At this point, the regiment was organised into a regimental HQ and three batteries; 210, 211, and 212 Atk batteries.

After the regiment's reformation in the RA, it joined the 88th (Field) Army Group, Royal Artillery based in Shrewsbury, and attached to Western Command. In 1950, the Regiment became cavalry again as the Queen's Own Worcestershire Hussars, equipped with armoured cars in the Royal Armoured Corps.

Early in 1956, the Government announced its intention to reduce the size of the T.A. due to the high cost. In November 1956, it was announced that the Warwickshire Yeomanry and The Queen's Own Worcestershire Hussars were to be amalgamated. The new Regiment became the Queen's Own Warwickshire and Worcestershire Yeomanry in 1957. Her Majesty Queen Elizabeth II, agreed to be Honorary Colonel of the Regiment, the only Regiment in the army to have that singular honour.

== Heritage and ceremonial ==
=== Regimental museum ===
The Worcester Soldier galleries (for the Worcestershire Regiment and the Queen's Own Worcestershire Hussars) is part of the Worcester City Art Gallery & Museum.

=== Uniforms and insignia ===
Following its formation in 1794 the "Worcestershire Troop of Gentlemen and Yeomen" wore red jackets faced in dark blue and silver, with white or buff breeches. The headdress was the Tarleton Cap worn by the regular light cavalry regiments. When re-raised in 1831 the Worcestershire Yeomanry adopted a red and white Light Dragoon dress, complete with plumed shako and buff facings. From 1850 to 1870 a Heavy Dragoon style helmet was worn, retaining the white plume of the earlier period. In 1871 a dark blue hussar uniform heavily embroidered in silver (for officers) or white (for other ranks) braiding, replaced the scarlet dragoon style (se photograph above). Fur busbies closely resembling those of the regular hussars were worn with red plumes and bags. Plainer blue undress uniforms were worn for training and ordinary duties by all ranks.

For reasons of economy and simplification, a khaki "lancer" style uniform was introduced in 1902–03 for the regiment, worn with scarlet facings for both full dress and service dress. Influenced by Boer War experience, a wide brimmed slouch hat with scarlet "page" band and plume was also worn. This attempt at modernisation proved unpopular with serving yeomen and by 1908 the dark blue, silver or white full dress had been restored to the regiment. The plain (without facings) khaki service dress of the regular cavalry was worn from 1907 onwards, replacing the colourful full dress for nearly all occasions after 1914. While battle dress or other standard British Army uniforms were worn after 1938, features such as the by now historic blue and scarlet survived in items such as the field service caps of World War II (see lede illustration above).

== See also ==
- Imperial Yeomanry
- List of Yeomanry Regiments 1908
- Yeomanry
- Yeomanry order of precedence
- British yeomanry during the First World War
- Second line yeomanry regiments of the British Army
- List of British Army Yeomanry Regiments converted to Royal Artillery

== Bibliography ==
=== Regiment-specific ===
- The Yeomanry Cavalry of Worcestershire 1794–1913.
- The Yeomanry cavalry of Worcestershire 1914–1922.
- Victor Godrich, Mountains of Moab The diary of a cavalry man with the Queen's Own Worcestershire Hussars 1908–1919.
- D.R. Guttery, The Queen's Own Worcestershire Hussars 1922–1956.
- Brian R. Owen, The Worcestershire Yeomanry Cavalry: A Brief Chronology Compiled from Regimental Histories and Other Records, Worcester: Museum of the Worcestershire Yeomanry Cavalry, 1979.
- R.J. Smith, The Uniforms of the British Yeomanry Force 1794–1914, 11: Worcestershire Yeomanry, Aldershot: Robert Ogilby Trust/Chippenham: Picton Publishing, 1990, ISBN 0-9515714-2-7.
- Derek Woodward, Worcestershire Yeomanry Cavalry (1794–1994).

=== General ===
- Burke's Peerage, Baronetage and Knightage, 100th Edn, London, 1953.
- J.B.M. Frederick, Lineage Book of British Land Forces 1660–1978, Vol I, Wakefield: Microform Academic, 1984, ISBN 1-85117-007-3.
- J.B.M. Frederick, Lineage Book of British Land Forces 1660–1978, Vol II, Wakefield: Microform Academic, 1984, ISBN 1-85117-009-X.
- Brig E.A. James, British Regiments 1914–18, London: Samson Books, 1978, ISBN 0-906304-03-2/Uckfield: Naval & Military Press, 2001, ISBN 978-1-84342-197-9.
- Lt-Col H.F. Joslen, Orders of Battle, United Kingdom and Colonial Formations and Units in the Second World War, 1939–1945, London: HM Stationery Office, 1960/London: London Stamp Exchange, 1990, ISBN 0-948130-03-2/ Uckfield: Naval & Military Press, 2003, ISBN 1-843424-74-6.
- Norman E.H. Litchfield, The Territorial Artillery 1908–1988 (Their Lineage, Uniforms and Badges), Nottingham: Sherwood Press, 1992, ISBN 0-9508205-2-0.
- Mileham, Patrick (1994). The Yeomanry Regiments; 200 Years of Tradition. Edinburgh: Canongate Academic. ISBN 1-898410-36-4.
- Rinaldi, Richard A (2008). Order of Battle of the British Army 1914. Ravi Rikhye. ISBN 978-0-97760728-0.
- Col H.C.B. Rogers, The Mounted Troops of the British Army 1066–1945, London: Seeley Service, 1959.
- Arthur Sleigh, The Royal Militia and Yeomanry Cavalry Army List, April 1850, London: British Army Despatch Press, 1850/Uckfield: Naval and Military Press, 1991, ISBN 978-1-84342-410-9.
- Philip Talbot, 'The English Yeomanry in the Nineteenth Century and the Great Boer War', Journal of the Society for Army Historical Research, Vol 79, No 317 (Spring 2001), pp. 45–62.
- War Office, A List of the Officers of the Militia, the Gentlemen & Yeomanry Cavalry, and Volunteer Infantry of the United Kingdom, 11th Edn, London: War Office, 14 October 1805/Uckfield: Naval and Military Press, 2005, ISBN 978-1-84574-207-2.
- War Office, Titles and Designations of Formations and Units of the Territorial Army, London: War Office, 7 November 1927 (RA sections also summarised in Litchfield, Appendix IV).

=== External links ===
- The Long, Long Trail
- Land Forces of Britain, the Empire and Commonwealth – Regiments.org (archive site)
- British Army units from 1945 on
- Queen's Own Warwickshire & Worcestershire Yeomanry Comrades Association Archived 23 March 2012 at the Wayback Machine – Website dedicated to past and present serving members of the Warwickshire Yeomanry, Queen's Own Worcestershire Hussars, and all successor units.
