= Queen's Own West Kent Yeomanry =

- Cap badge of the Queen's Own West Kent Yeomanry
- Active: 1794 – 20 August 1920
- Country: Great Britain (1794–1800); United Kingdom (1801–1920)
- Branch: British Army
- Type: Yeomanry; Infantry
- Size: Regiment; Three Regiments (First World War)
- Peacetime HQ: Maidstone
- Mottos: "Liberty, Loyalty, Property"
- Engagements: South Africa 1900–01; First World War Gallipoli 1915 Egypt 1916–17 Palestine 1917–18 France and Flanders 1918

The Queen's Own West Kent Yeomanry was a British Army regiment formed in 1794. It served in the Second Boer War and the First World War. It amalgamated with the Royal East Kent (The Duke of Connaught's Own) Yeomanry (Mounted Rifles) to form the Kent Yeomanry in 1920.

== History ==
=== Formation and early history ===
Under threat of invasion by the French Revolutionary government from 1793, and with insufficient military forces to repulse such an attack, the British government under William Pitt the Younger decided in 1794 to increase the Militia and to form corps of volunteers for the defence of the country. The mounted arm of the volunteers became known as the "Gentlemen and Yeomanry Cavalry".

In 1827 the government disbanded the Yeomanry Regiments in those districts where they had not been mobilised in the previous 10 years. The Kent Regiment was stood down and their equipment returned to the regular army. In 1830 the West Kent Regiment of Yeomanry Cavalry was reformed and in 1864 the regiment was awarded the title "Queen's Own" and became known as the West Kent Regiment of Yeomanry Cavalry (Queen's Own).

=== Second Boer War ===
On 13 December 1899, the decision to allow volunteer forces serve in the Second Boer War was made. Due to the string of defeats during Black Week in December 1899, the British government realized they were going to need more troops than just the regular army, thus issuing a Royal Warrant on 24 December 1899. This warrant officially created the Imperial Yeomanry. The Royal Warrant asked standing Yeomanry regiments to provide service companies of approximately 115 men each. In addition to this, many British citizens (usually mid-upper class) volunteered to join the new regiment.

The first contingent of recruits contained 550 officers, 10,371 men with 20 battalions and four companies, which arrived in South Africa between February and April 1900. Upon arrival, the regiment was sent throughout the zone of operations. The Queen's Own West Kent Yeomanry provided troops for the 36th Company, 9th Battalion.

The Imperial Yeomanry was equipped and trained as Mounted infantry. This experiment was considered a success, and all the existing Yeomanry regiments were converted into IY in 1901, the West Kent unit becoming the West Kent Imperial Yeomanry (Queen's Own). When the Yeomanry were subsumed into the Territorial Force in 1908, the 'Imperial' part of the title was dropped.

The regiment was based at Union Street in Maidstone at this time (since demolished).

=== First World War ===
In accordance with the Territorial and Reserve Forces Act 1907 (7 Edw. 7, c.9) which brought the Territorial Force into being, the TF was intended to be a home defence force for service during wartime and members could not be compelled to serve outside the country. However, on the outbreak of war on 4 August 1914, many members volunteered for Imperial Service. Therefore, TF units were split in August and September 1914 into 1st Line (liable for overseas service) and 2nd Line (home service for those unable or unwilling to serve overseas) units. Later, a 3rd Line was formed to act as a reserve, providing trained replacements for the 1st and 2nd Line regiments.

==== 1/1st Queen's Own West Kent Yeomanry ====
The 1st Line regiment was mobilised on 4 August 1914 at the outbreak of the First World War and was in the Canterbury area (under Second Army of Central Force) until September 1915. It was dismounted and left Kent for Liverpool; on 24 September it boarded RMS Olympic and sailed the next day. It arrived at Lemnos on 1 October. The regiment landed in Gallipoli on 8 October and was attached to the 42nd (East Lancashire) Division. On 30 December it was evacuated to Mudros with 42nd Division; it left the Division at Mudros on 2 January 1916.

The brigade, with the regiment, was withdrawn to Egypt in February 1916 and formed part of the Suez Canal Defences. On 22 February, South Eastern Mounted Brigade was absorbed into the 3rd Dismounted Brigade (along with the Eastern Mounted Brigade). The brigade served as part of the Suez Canal Defences from 14 March to 26 July attached to 42nd (East Lancashire) Division; it then joined the Western Frontier Force. By the end of the year, it was back on the Suez.

The brigade was with the Suez Canal Defences when, on 14 January 1917, Egyptian Expeditionary Force (EEF) Order No. 26 instructed that the 2nd, 3rd and 4th Dismounted Brigades be reorganized as the 229th, 230th and 231st Brigades. The brigade units were reorganized in January and February 1917. As a result, the 1/1st Queen's Own West Kent Yeomanry was amalgamated with 1/1st Royal East Kent Yeomanry at Sollum on 1 February 1917 and redesignated 10th (Royal East Kent and West Kent Yeomanry) Battalion, Buffs (East Kent Regiment).

On 23 February, the GOC EEF (Lt-Gen Sir A.J. Murray) sought permission from the War Office to form the 229th, 230th and 231st Brigades into a new division. The War Office granted permission and the new 74th (Yeomanry) Division started to form. The 230th Brigade joined the division at Deir el Balah between 9 and 13 April. The battalion remained with 230th Brigade in 74th (Yeomanry) Division for the rest of the war.

With the 74th Division, the battalion took part in the invasion of Palestine in 1917 and 1918. It fought in the Second and Third Battles of Gaza (including the capture of Beersheba and the Sheria Position). At the end of 1917, it took part in the capture and defence of Jerusalem and in March 1918 in the Battle of Tell 'Asur. On 3 April 1918, the Division was warned that it would move to France and by 30 April 1918 had completed embarkation at Alexandria.

In May 1918, the battalion landed at Marseille, France with 74th (Yeomanry) Division. It served in France and Flanders with the division for the rest of the war. By 18 May, the division had concentrated around Rue in the Abbeville area. Here the dismounted Yeomanry underwent training for service on the Western Front, particularly gas defence.

On 14 July 1918 the Yeomanry Division went into the line for the first time, near Merville on the right of XI Corps. From September 1918, as part of III Corps of Fourth Army, it took part in the Hundred Days Offensive including the Second Battle of the Somme (Second Battle of Bapaume) and the Battles of the Hindenburg Line (Battle of Épehy). In October and November 1918 it took part in the Final Advance in Artois and Flanders. By the Armistice it was near Tournai, Belgium, still with 74th (Yeomanry) Division.

With the end of the war, the troops of 74th Division were engaged in railway repair work and education was undertaken while demobilisation began. The division and its subformations were disbanded on 10 July 1919.

==== 2/1st Queen's Own West Kent Yeomanry ====
The 2nd Line regiment was formed at Maidstone in August 1914. In January 1915 it moved to Hounslow Barracks and in April to Maresfield; there it took over the horses of the Royal Canadian Dragoons and Lord Strathcona's Horse who were going dismounted to the Western Front. In October 1915 the regiment was at Westbere, near Canterbury in 2/1st South Eastern Mounted Brigade. On 31 March 1916, the remaining Mounted Brigades were ordered to be numbered in a single sequence; the brigade was numbered as 14th Mounted Brigade and joined 4th Mounted Division, still at Canterbury. In July 1916 it transferred to 3rd Mounted Brigade in the new 1st Mounted Division near Maidstone.

In October 1916 it handed its horses over to 2/1st Queen's Own Dorset Yeomanry and in November was converted to a cyclist unit. The regiment was merged with the 2/1st Royal East Kent Yeomanry to form 9th (East Kent and West Kent) Yeomanry Cyclist Regiment in 3rd Cyclist Brigade in the Ipswich area. In March 1917 it resumed its identity as 2/1st Queen's Own West Kent Yeomanry at Woodbridge, still in 3rd Cyclist Brigade. In April 1918, the regiment moved with its brigade to Ireland and was stationed in Dublin and then Claremorris; there was no further change before the end of the war.

==== 3/1st Queen's Own West Kent Yeomanry ====
The 3rd Line regiment was formed at the end of 1914 at Canterbury. In June 1915 it was affiliated to 3rd Reserve Cavalry Regiment at Canterbury. In the summer of 1916 it was dismounted and attached to the 3rd Line Groups of the Home Counties Division at Crowborough as its 1st Line was serving as infantry. In November 1916 it was at Tunbridge Wells. The regiment was disbanded in February 1917 with personnel transferring to the 2nd Line regiment or to the 4th (Reserve) Battalion of the Royal West Kent Regiment at Crowborough.

=== Post war ===
Following the experience of the First World War, it was decided that only the fourteen most senior yeomanry regiments would be retained as horsed cavalry, with the rest being transferred to other roles. As a result, on 20 August 1920, the Royal East Kent (The Duke of Connaught's Own) Yeomanry (Mounted Rifles) was amalgamated with the West Kent Yeomanry (Queen's Own) to form the Kent Yeomanry and simultaneously re-roled as field artillery to form 6th (Kent) Army Brigade, RFA.

== Battle honours ==
The West Kent Yeomanry (Queen's Own) was awarded the following battle honours:

Second Boer War

South Africa 1900–01

First World War

Somme 1918, Bapaume 1918, Hindenburg Line, Épehy, Pursuit to Mons, France and Flanders 1918, Gallipoli 1915, Egypt 1916–17, Gaza, Jerusalem, Tell 'Asur, Palestine 1917–18

== See also ==
- List of Yeomanry Regiments 1908
- Yeomanry order of precedence
- British yeomanry during the First World War
- Second line yeomanry regiments of the British Army
- List of British Army Yeomanry Regiments converted to Royal Artillery
- Kent and Sharpshooters Yeomanry
- Royal Yeomanry

== Bibliography ==
- Becke, Archibald F. (1936). Order of Battle of Divisions Part 2A. The Territorial Force Mounted Divisions and the 1st-Line Territorial Force Divisions (42–56). London: HMSO. OCLC 4405016.
- Becke, Archibald F. (1937). Order of Battle of Divisions Part 2B. The 2nd-Line Territorial Force Divisions (57th–69th) with The Home-Service Divisions (71st–73rd) and 74th and 75th Divisions. London: HMSO. OCLC 4405016.
- Frederick, J.B.M. (1984). Lineage Book of British Land Forces 1660–1978. Wakefield, Yorkshire: Microform Academic Publishers. ISBN 1-85117-009-X.
- James, Brigadier E.A. (1978). British Regiments 1914–18. London: Samson Books Limited. ISBN 0-906304-03-2.
- Mileham, Patrick (1994). The Yeomanry Regiments; 200 Years of Tradition. Edinburgh: Canongate Academic. ISBN 1-898410-36-4.
- Rinaldi, Richard A (2008). Order of Battle of the British Army 1914. Ravi Rikhye. ISBN 978-0-97760728-0.
- Westlake, Ray (1996). British Regiments at Gallipoli. Barnsley: Leo Cooper. ISBN 0-85052-511-X.
