= Northgate Street drill hall, Warwick =

Drill hall in Warwick, England

Northgate Street drill hall
- Warwick
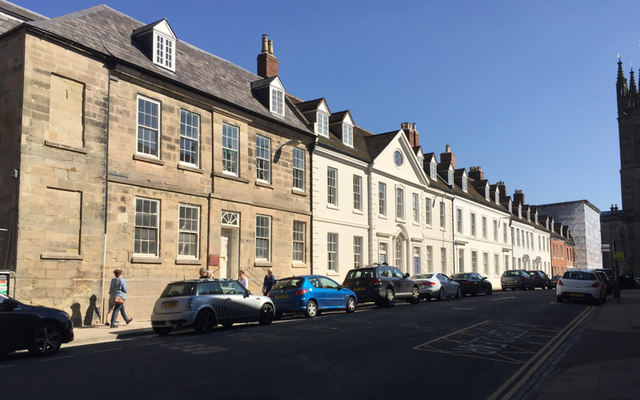
- The drill hall was in the third section of the four white stucco-faced sections of the terrace

Site information
- Type: Drill hall

Location
- Location within Warwickshire
- Coordinates: 52.28292°N 1.58871°W

Site history
- Built: Late 17th century
- Built for: War Office
- In use: Late 17th century-1956

The Northgate Street drill hall is a former military installation in Warwick.

== History ==
The building, comprising Nos. 10 and 12 Northgate Street, was constructed as a series of private residences in the late 17th century. It was acquired by Warwickshire County Council and converted in a drill hall for the Warwickshire Rifle Volunteers in the mid-19th century. This unit evolved to become 2nd Volunteer Battalion, The Royal Warwickshire Regiment in 1883 and 7th Battalion, the Royal Warwickshire Regiment in 1908. Although the headquarters moved to Coventry in 1908, the regiment maintained a company, G Company, in Warwick for a while.

Meanwhile, the drill hall had also become the headquarters of the Warwickshire Yeomanry in the mid-19th century. The regiment was mobilised at the drill hall in August 1914 before being deployed to Gallipoli. After the Second World War the yeomanry moved their headquarters to Coventry, but maintained one squadron, B Squadron, in Warwick. After the regiment amalgamated with the Queen's Own Worcestershire Hussars to form the Queen's Own Warwickshire and Worcestershire Yeomanry in 1956, the building was converted back for residential use.
