= Royal East Kent Yeomanry =

- Active: 1794 – 20 August 1920
- Country: Kingdom of Great Britain (1794–1800); United Kingdom (1801–present)
- Branch: British Army
- Type: Yeomanry; Infantry
- Size: Regiment; Three Regiments (First World War)
- Peacetime HQ: Canterbury
- Mottos: "Liberty, Loyalty, Property"
- Engagements: South Africa 1900–01; First World War Gallipoli 1915 Egypt 1916–17 Palestine 1917–18 France and Flanders 1918

The Royal East Kent Yeomanry was a British Army regiment formed in 1794. It saw action in the Second Boer War and the First World War.

== History ==
=== Formation and early history ===
The regiment was formed in 1794, originally as a series of independent troops based in the important towns of Kent, England, as part of the response to the French Revolutionary Wars. In 1830 George Finch-Hatton, 10th Earl of Winchilsea, was appointed as lieutenant-colonel in command. In the middle years of the 19th century, the regiment frequently provided escorts for Queen Victoria and members of the Royal Family, and as a result, in 1856 the East Kent Yeomanry became the Royal East Kent Regiment of Mounted Rifles and, in 1873, the Royal East Kent Mounted Rifles (The Duke of Connaught's Own).

=== Second Boer War ===
On 13 December 1899, the decision to allow volunteer forces serve in the Second Boer War was made. Due to the string of defeats during Black Week in December 1899, the British government realised they were going to need more troops than just the regular army, thus issuing a Royal Warrant on 24 December 1899. This warrant officially created the Imperial Yeomanry. The Royal Warrant asked standing Yeomanry regiments to provide service companies of approximately 115 men each. In addition to this, many British citizens (usually mid-upper class) volunteered to join the new regiment.

The first contingent of recruits contained 550 officers, 10,371 men with 20 battalions and 4 companies, which arrived in South Africa between February and April, 1900. Upon arrival, the regiment was sent throughout the zone of operations. The Royal East Kent Yeomanry provided troops for the 33rd and 53rd (East Kent) Companies, in the 11th and 14th Battalions respectively.

The Imperial Yeomanry was equipped and trained as Mounted infantry. This experiment was considered a success, and all the existing Yeomanry regiments were converted into IY in 1901, the East Kent unit becoming the Royal East Kent Imperial Yeomanry (Duke of Connaught's Own). When the Yeomanry were subsumed into the Territorial Force in 1908, the 'Imperial' part of the title was dropped. The regiment was based at St Peter's Lane in Canterbury at this time.

=== First World War ===
In accordance with the Territorial and Reserve Forces Act 1907 (7 Edw. 7, c.9) which brought the Territorial Force into being, the TF was intended to be a home defence force for service during wartime and members could not be compelled to serve outside the country. However, on the outbreak of war on 4 August 1914, many members volunteered for Imperial Service. Therefore, TF units were split in August and September 1914 into 1st Line (liable for overseas service) and 2nd Line (home service for those unable or unwilling to serve overseas) units. Later, a 3rd Line was formed to act as a reserve, providing trained replacements for the 1st and 2nd Line regiments.

==== 1/1st Royal East Kent Yeomanry ====
The 1st Line regiment was mobilised on 4 August 1914 at the outbreak of the First World War and was in the Canterbury area (under Second Army of Central Force) until September 1915. It was dismounted and left Kent for Liverpool; on 24 September it boarded RMS Olympic and sailed the next day. It arrived at Lemnos on 1 October. The regiment landed in Gallipoli on 8 October and was attached to the 42nd (East Lancashire) Division. On 30 December it was evacuated to Mudros with 42nd Division; it left the Division at Mudros on 2 January 1916.

The brigade, with the regiment, was withdrawn to Egypt in February 1916 and formed part of the Suez Canal Defences. On 22 February, South Eastern Mounted Brigade was absorbed into the 3rd Dismounted Brigade (along with the Eastern Mounted Brigade). The brigade served as part of the Suez Canal Defences from 14 March to 26 July attached to 42nd (East Lancashire) Division; it then joined the Western Frontier Force. By the end of the year, it was back on the Suez.

The brigade was with the Suez Canal Defences when, on 14 January 1917, Egyptian Expeditionary Force (EEF) Order No. 26 instructed that the 2nd, 3rd and 4th Dismounted Brigades be reorganized as the 229th, 230th and 231st Brigades. The brigade units were reorganized in January and February 1917. As a result, the 1/1st Royal East Kent Yeomanry was amalgamated with 1/1st Queen's Own West Kent Yeomanry at Sollum on 1 February 1917 and redesignated 10th (Royal East Kent and West Kent Yeomanry) Battalion, Buffs (East Kent Regiment).

On 23 February, the GOC EEF (Lt-Gen Sir A.J. Murray) sought permission from the War Office to form the 229th, 230th and 231st Brigades into a new division. The War Office granted permission and the new 74th (Yeomanry) Division started to form. The 230th Brigade joined the division at Deir el Balah between 9 and 13 April. The battalion remained with 230th Brigade in 74th (Yeomanry) Division for the rest of the war.

With the 74th Division, the battalion took part in the invasion of Palestine in 1917 and 1918. It fought in the Second and Third Battles of Gaza (including the capture of Beersheba and the Sheria Position). At the end of 1917, it took part in the capture and defence of Jerusalem and in March 1918 in the Battle of Tell 'Asur. On 3 April 1918, the Division was warned that it would move to France and by 30 April 1918 had completed embarkation at Alexandria.

In May 1918, the battalion landed at Marseille, France with 74th (Yeomanry) Division. It served in France and Flanders with the division for the rest of the war. By 18 May, the division had concentrated around Rue in the Abbeville area. Here the dismounted Yeomanry underwent training for service on the Western Front, particularly gas defence.

On 14 July 1918 the Yeomanry Division went into the line for the first time, near Merville on the right of XI Corps. From September 1918, as part of III Corps of Fourth Army, it took part in the Hundred Days Offensive including the Second Battle of the Somme (Second Battle of Bapaume) and the Battles of the Hindenburg Line (Battle of Épehy). In October and November 1918 it took part in the Final Advance in Artois and Flanders. By the Armistice it was near Tournai, Belgium, still with 74th (Yeomanry) Division.

With the end of the war, the troops of 74th Division were engaged in railway repair work and education was undertaken while demobilisation began. The division and its subformations were disbanded on 10 July 1919.

==== 2/1st Royal East Kent Yeomanry ====
The 2nd Line regiment was formed in 1914 and in 1915 was in 2/1st South Eastern Mounted Brigade. In September 1915 it was at Canterbury. On 31 March 1916, the remaining Mounted Brigades were ordered to be numbered in a single sequence; the brigade was numbered as 14th Mounted Brigade and joined 4th Mounted Division, still at Canterbury.

In July 1916, the regiment was converted to a cyclist unit in 7th Cyclist Brigade, 2nd Cyclist Division in the Manningtree area. In November 1916 the division was broken up and the regiment was merged with the 2/1st Queen's Own West Kent Yeomanry to form 9th (East Kent and West Kent) Yeomanry Cyclist Regiment in 3rd Cyclist Brigade in the Ipswich area. In March 1917 it resumed its identity as 2/1st Royal East Kent Yeomanry at Woodbridge, still in 3rd Cyclist Brigade. In April 1918, the regiment moved with its brigade to Ireland and was stationed in County Mayo; there was no further change before the end of the war.

==== 3/1st Royal East Kent Yeomanry ====
The 3rd Line regiment was formed in 1915 and in the summer it was affiliated to a Reserve Cavalry Regiment in Eastern Command. In the summer of 1916 it was dismounted and attached to the 3rd Line Groups of the Home Counties Division at Crowborough as its 1st Line was serving as infantry. The regiment was disbanded in early 1917 with personnel transferring to the 2nd Line regiment or to the 4th (Reserve) Battalion of the Buffs (East Kent Regiment) at Crowborough.

=== Post war ===
Following the experience of the First World War, it was decided that only the fourteen most senior yeomanry regiments would be retained as horsed cavalry, with the rest being transferred to other roles. As a result, on 20 August 1920, the Royal East Kent (The Duke of Connaught's Own) Yeomanry (Mounted Rifles) was amalgamated with the West Kent Yeomanry (Queen's Own) to form the Kent Yeomanry and simultaneously re-roled as field artillery to form 6th (Kent) Army Brigade, RFA.

== Battle Honours ==
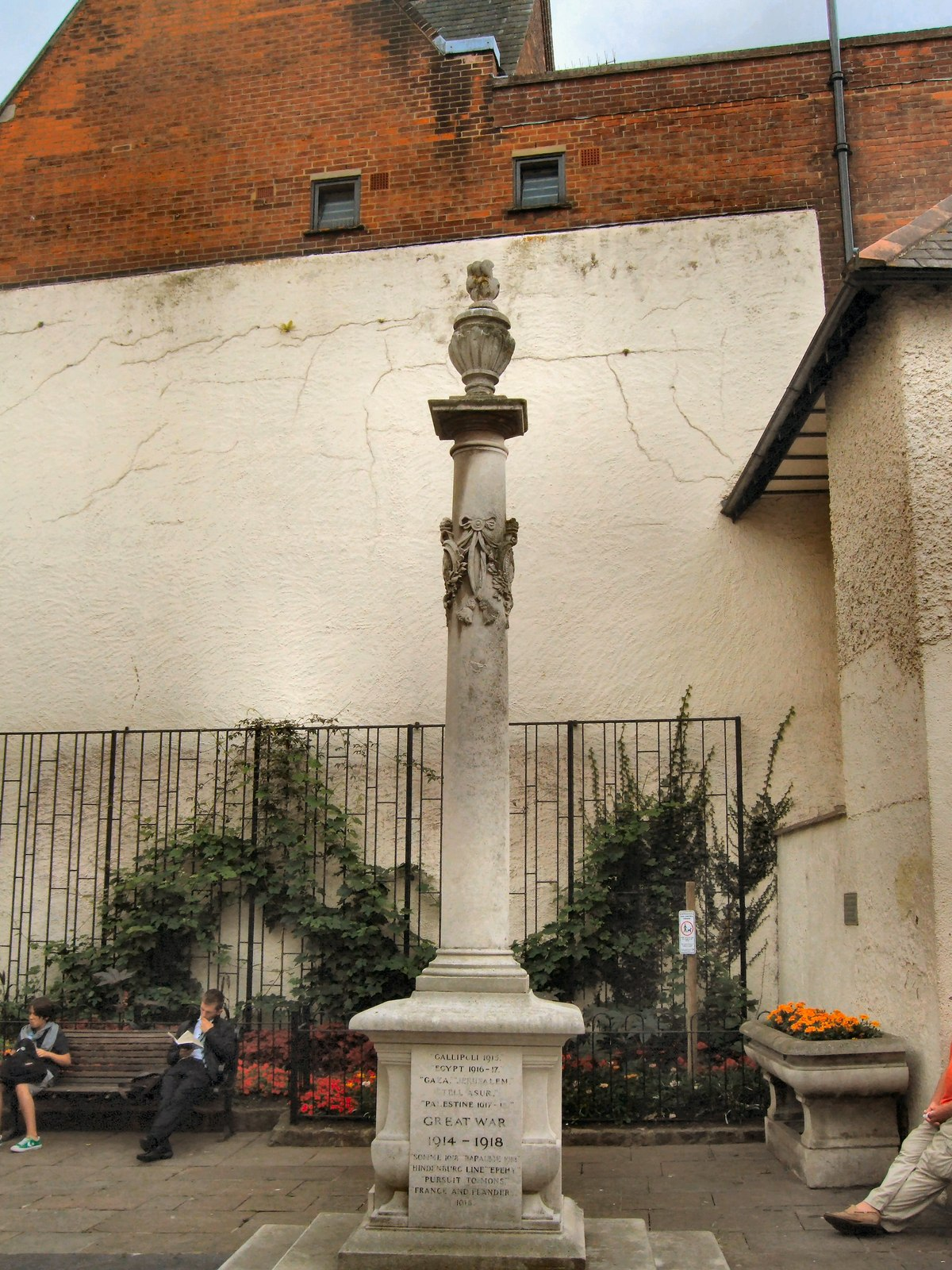
The Royal East Kent Yeomanry Memorial, Canterbury

The Royal East Kent Yeomanry (The Duke of Connaught's Own) (Mounted Rifles) was awarded the following battle honours:

Second Boer War

South Africa 1900–01

First World War

Somme 1918, Bapaume 1918, Hindenburg Line, Épehy, Pursuit to Mons, France and Flanders 1918, Gallipoli 1915, Egypt 1916–17, Gaza, Jerusalem, Tell 'Asur, Palestine 1917–18

== Uniform ==
Designated as Mounted Rifles from 1856, the regiment achieved the unique destination amongst Yeomanry units of wearing rifle green uniforms. By the early 1900s this full dress had evolved into a close copy of that worn by the 60th Rifles. As such it included dark green tunics with red facings plus rifle green overalls (tight fitting trousers) with black and scarlet stripes. All ranks wore black hussar style braiding across the tunic front. The headdress was a scarlet peaked cap with black band, instead of the astrakhan busby of infantry rifles regiments. From 1903 to 1920 the Royal East Kent Yeomanry wore the standard khaki field dress of the British Army for training, active service and ordinary duties, with regimental insignia.

== See also ==
- List of Yeomanry Regiments 1908
- Yeomanry order of precedence
- British yeomanry during the First World War
- Second line yeomanry regiments of the British Army
- List of British Army Yeomanry Regiments converted to Royal Artillery
- Kent and Sharpshooters Yeomanry
- Royal Yeomanry

== Bibliography ==
- Becke, Archibald F. (1936). Order of Battle of Divisions Part 2A. The Territorial Force Mounted Divisions and the 1st-Line Territorial Force Divisions (42–56). London: HMSO. OCLC 4405016.
- Becke, Archibald F. (1937). Order of Battle of Divisions Part 2B. The 2nd-Line Territorial Force Divisions (57th–69th) with The Home-Service Divisions (71st–73rd) and 74th and 75th Divisions. London: HMSO. OCLC 4405016.
- Frederick, J.B.M. (1984). Lineage Book of British Land Forces 1660–1978. Wakefield, Yorkshire: Microform Academic Publishers. ISBN 1-85117-009-X.
- James, Brigadier E.A. (1978). British Regiments 1914–18. London: Samson Books Limited. ISBN 0-906304-03-2.
- Mileham, Patrick (1994). The Yeomanry Regiments; 200 Years of Tradition. Edinburgh: Canongate Academic. ISBN 1-898410-36-4.
- Rinaldi, Richard A (2008). Order of Battle of the British Army 1914. Ravi Rikhye. ISBN 978-0-97760728-0.
- Westlake, Ray (1996). British Regiments at Gallipoli. Barnsley: Leo Cooper. ISBN 0-85052-511-X.
