= 8th Cyclist Brigade =

2/1st Scottish Horse Mounted Brigade 19th Mounted Brigade 12th Cyclist Brigade 8th Cyclist Brigade
- Active: September 1914–November 1918
- Country: United Kingdom
- Branch: British Army
- Type: Yeomanry; Bicycle infantry
- Size: Brigade
- Service: World War I

The 19th Mounted Brigade previously known as the 2/1st Scottish Horse Mounted Brigade was a 2nd Line yeomanry brigade of the British Army during the First World War. In July 1916 it was converted to a cyclist formation as 12th Cyclist Brigade and redesignated as 8th Cyclist Brigade in November 1916. It was still in existence, in Ireland, at the end of the war.

== Mounted Brigade ==
In accordance with the Territorial and Reserve Forces Act 1907 (7 Edw.7, c.9) which brought the Territorial Force into being, the TF was intended to be a home defence force for service during wartime and members could not be compelled to serve outside the country. However, on the outbreak of war on 4 August 1914, many members volunteered for Imperial Service. Therefore, TF units were split in August and September 1914 into 1st Line (liable for overseas service) and 2nd Line (home service for those unable or unwilling to serve overseas) units. Later, a 3rd Line was formed to act as a reserve, providing trained replacements for the 1st and 2nd Line regiments. Similarly, by 1915 most 2nd Line yeomanry regiments were formed into 2nd Line mounted brigades with the same title and composition as the pre-war 1st Line formations. Two other 2nd Line brigades (2/1st Southern Mounted Brigade and 2/1st Western Mounted Brigade) without 1st Line antecedents were also formed.

The Scottish Horse was initially expanded by the formation of a 3rd Regiment in August 1914. All three regiments then formed 2nd Line units (2/1st Scottish Horse, 2/2nd Scottish Horse, and 2/3rd Scottish Horse) in August and September 1914 at Dunkeld and Aberdeen. They moved to Kettering, Northamptonshire and formed 2/1st Scottish Horse Mounted Brigade. At the end of 1915 they moved to Alford, Lincolnshire. On 31 March 1916, the remaining Mounted Brigades were ordered to be numbered in a single sequence and the brigade became 19th Mounted Brigade, still in Lincolnshire under Northern Command.

== Cyclist Brigade ==
In July 1916 there was a major reorganization of 2nd Line yeomanry units in the United Kingdom. All but 12 regiments were converted to cyclists and as a consequence the brigade was converted to 12th Cyclist Brigade. Further reorganization in October and November 1916 saw the brigade redesignated as 8th Cyclist Brigade in November, still in Lincolnshire.

At the end of 1917, the brigade moved to Fife with the regiments at Ladybank (2/1st), St Andrews (2/2nd) and Cupar (2/3rd). In April 1918, it moved to Ireland (headquarters at Limerick) and the regiments were stationed at Limerick (2/1st), Lahinch (2/2nd) and Tulla (2/3rd) where they remained until the end of the war.

== See also ==
- Scottish Horse Mounted Brigade for the 1st Line formation
- British yeomanry during the First World War
- Second line yeomanry regiments of the British Army

== Bibliography ==
- James, Brigadier E.A. (1978). British Regiments 1914–18. London: Samson Books Limited. ISBN 0-906304-03-2.
- Rinaldi, Richard A (2008). Order of Battle of the British Army 1914. Ravi Rikhye. ISBN 978-0-97760728-0.
