= SS Empire Capulet =

World War II merchant ship of the United Kingdom

History
- Name: Empire Capulet (1943-46); Hesione (1946-60)
- Owner: Ministry of War Transport (1944-46); British & South American Steam Navigation Co Ltd (1946-60)
- Operator: A Holt & Co Ltd (1943-44); Glen Line Ltd (1944-45); British & South American Steam Navigation Co Ltd (1945-46); Houston Line (London) Ltd (1946-60)
- Port of registry: (United Kingdom) South Shields (1944-46); (United Kingdom) London (1946-60)
- Builder: John Readhead & Sons Ltd
- Yard number: 532
- Launched: 20 January 1943
- Completed: March 1943
- Identification: Code Letters BFGB; United Kingdom Official Number 169050
- Fate: Scrapped 1960.

General characteristics
- Tonnage: 7,044 GRT; 4,869 NRT; 10,300 DWT
- Length: 430 ft 9 in (131.29 m)
- Beam: 56 ft 2 in (17.12 m)
- Depth: 35 ft 2 in (10.72 m)
- Installed power: Triple expansion steam engine
- Propulsion: Screw propeller
- Speed: 9 knots (17 km/h)

Empire Capulet was a 7,044 GRT cargo ship which was built in 1943 for the Ministry of War Transport (MoWT). In 1946 she was sold and renamed Hesione. She served until 1960 when she was scrapped.

== Description ==
The ship was built by John Readhead & Sons Ltd, South Shields, as yard number 532. She was launched on 20 January 1943 and completed in March.

The ship was 430 feet 9 inches (131.29 m) long, with a beam of 56 feet 2 inches (17.12 m) and a depth of 35 feet 2 inches (10.72 m). Her GRT was 7,044, with a NRT of 4,869. Her DWT was 10,300.

She was propelled by a triple expansion steam engine, which had cylinders of 24 1/2 inches (62 cm), 39 inches (99 cm) and 70 inches (180 cm) diameter and 48 inches (120 cm) stroke. The ship could make 9 knots (17 km/h).

== History ==
Empire Canpulet was built for the MoWT. She was initially placed under the management of A Holt & Co. The Official Number 169050 and Code Letters BFGB were allocated and her port of registry was South Shields. Management was soon transferred to Glen Line Ltd.

Empire Capulet was a member of a number of convoys during the Second World War.

MKS 26

Convoy MKS 26 departed Alexandria, Egypt on 24 September 1943 and arrived at Liverpool on 17 October. Empire Capulet left the convoy at Malta.

MKS 37

Convoy MKS 37 departed Port Said, Egypt on 10 January 1944 and arrived at the Clyde on 3 February. Empire Capulet joined the convoy at Alexandria, Egypt and left it at Augusta, Italy.

In the immediate aftermath of the Allied Invasion of Normandy, Empire Capulet was pressed into service as a troopship. She embarked troops from the 53rd (Worcestershire Yeomanry) Airlanding Light Regiment, Royal Artillery at Newhaven, East Sussex on 9 and 10 June 1944, and sailed to an assembly area off Southend-on-Sea, Essex, from where the convoy which had assembled sailed on 12 June. Empire Capulet anchored off Luc-sur-Mer, Calvados on 13 June to unload her cargo. At 23:30, she was attacked by enemy aircraft which dropped anti-personnel bombs, setting fire a raft alongside Empire Capulet which had been loaded with two lorries and a motorcycle. The raft was set adrift and allowed to burn itself out. Sixteen casualties were sustained on board Empire Capulet. Unloading of Empire Capulet was completed at 03:30 on 14 June.

On 7 August 1944, Empire Capulet departed Newport, Monmouthshire on a voyage that was to last for two years and two months. She arrived at Liverpool on 3 October 1946, having visited Canada, the United States, the Mediterranean, India, Japan and South Africa.

In 1946, Empire Capulet was sold to the British & South American Steam Navigation Co Ltd and was renamed Hesione, the third ship to carry that name. She was operated under the management of Houston Line (London) Ltd. Hesione served until 1960. She arrived on 5 October 1960 at Hong Kong for scrapping.
