= Kent Yeomanry =

- Cap Badge of the Royal Artillery (pre-1953)
- Active: 20 August 1920 – 1 May 1961
- Country: United Kingdom
- Branch: Territorial Army
- Type: Field Artillery; Light Anti-Aircraft Artillery
- Size: One Regiment; Two Regiments (Second World War)
- Peacetime HQ: Maidstone
- Engagements: Second World War North-West Europe 1940, '44–45 North Africa 1942–43 Italy 1944–45

The Kent Yeomanry was an artillery regiment of the Territorial Army (TA) formed in 1920 by the amalgamation of the Royal East Kent (The Duke of Connaught's Own) Yeomanry (Mounted Rifles) and West Kent Yeomanry (Queen's Own). For the Second World War it was expanded to form two field artillery regiments – 97 (Kent Yeomanry) Field Regiment, Royal Artillery and 143 (Kent Yeomanry) Field Regiment, Royal Artillery – which saw active service in North Africa, Italy and North-West Europe, both with the BEF in 1940 and on the Second Front in 1944–45. Post war it was reconstituted as 297 (Kent Yeomanry) Light Anti-Aircraft Regiment, Royal Artillery before being amalgamated in 1961 with the 3rd/4th County of London Yeomanry (Sharpshooters) to form the Kent and Sharpshooters Yeomanry.

== History ==
=== Formation ===
Following the experience of the First World War, it was decided that only the fourteen most senior yeomanry regiments would be retained as horsed cavalry, with the rest being transferred to other roles. As a result, on 20 August 1920, the Royal East Kent (The Duke of Connaught's Own) Yeomanry (Mounted Rifles) was amalgamated with the West Kent Yeomanry (Queen's Own) to form the Kent Yeomanry and simultaneously re-roled as field artillery to form 6th (Kent) Army Brigade, Royal Field Artillery.

In 1921 the regiment regained its yeomanry title and was renumbered as the 97th (Kent Yeomanry) Brigade, Royal Field Artillery. Within the brigade, two batteries were subtitled "Duke of Connaught's Own Yeomanry", – 385th at Canterbury and 386th at Ashford – and two were subtitled "Queen's Own Yeomanry" – 387 at Bromley and 388 at Maidstone. The brigade's HQ was also at Maidstone. Another title change came in June 1924 as the Royal Field Artillery was subsumed back into the Royal Artillery and the regiment became 97th (Kent Yeomanry) Field Brigade, RA, and the batteries became 'Field Batteries'. The final change came in 1938 as artillery brigades became regiments, and the unit became 97th (Kent Yeomanry) Army Field Regiment, RA in November.

By 1939 it became clear that a new European war was likely to break out, and the doubling of the Territorial Army was authorised, with each unit forming a duplicate. 97 (Kent Yeomanry) Army Field Regiment, RA formed 143 Field Regiment, RA. The new regiment continued the tradition of including batteries from both East and West Kent.

=== Second World War ===
==== 97 (Kent Yeomanry) Field Regiment, Royal Artillery ====
97 (Kent Yeomanry) Army Field Regiment mobilized on 3 September 1939 at Maidstone under Eastern Command with 385 (Duke of Connaught's Own Yeomanry) and 387 (Queen's Own Yeomanry) Batteries.

The regiment joined the BEF in May 1940, initially with III Corps then attached to 5th Infantry Division. During the Battle of France, the regiment saw action at Saint-Valery-en-Caux in June 1940; after the German advance the regiment destroyed its guns and equipment and headed to Dunkirk for evacuation in Operation Dynamo.

Field regiments had been organised in 1938 into two 12-gun batteries. The experience of the BEF in 1940 showed the problem with this organisation: field regiments were intended to support an infantry brigade of three battalions. This could not be managed without severe disruption to the regiment. As a result, field regiments were reorganised into three 8-gun batteries. The third battery (470) was formed in the regiment at Great Baddow in March 1941.

The regiment arrived in Iraq on 20 October 1941 and was initially under command of Tenth Army before being assigned to 10th Indian Infantry Division on 19 November. On 25 April 1942, 470 Field Bty left to form part of X (later 164th) Field Regt, RA. The rest of the regiment arrived in Egypt with the division on 31 May. On 5 July it came under command of British Troops in Egypt. The regiment dropped the "Army" designation on 13 September and on the same date joined the 7th Armoured Division. Armed with sixteen 25 pounders, the regiment served with 7th Armoured in the Second Battle of El Alamein. On 20 December it was placed under command of GHQ, Middle East Forces and 470 Field Bty was reformed for the regiment.

In October 1943 it rejoined the 10th Indian Division, (Note: Kempton does not support this assertion and Joslen states that the regiment ceased to be under command of Indian Formations on 5 July 1942.) serving in North Africa, Palestine and Italy, where it ended the war on the Adriatic coast near Trieste.

The Regimental HQ with 385, 387 and 470 Batteries were placed in suspended animation (Note: "suspended animation" describes units that continued to exist but without personnel or equipment.) on 15 December 1945.

==== 143 (Kent Yeomanry) Field Regiment, Royal Artillery ====
143rd Field Regiment mobilised on 3 September 1939 at Ashford under Eastern Command with 386 (Duke of Connaught's Own Yeomanry) and 388 (Queen's Own Yeomanry) Batteries. It spent the early part of the war in Iceland. While there, it was reorganised from two 12-gun batteries to three 8-gun batteries when the third battery (507) was formed in the regiment in May 1941. It was authorised to use the "Kent Yeomanry" designation from 17 February 1942.

Arriving back in the UK, the regiment was assigned to the 49th (West Riding) Infantry Division, the Polar Bears, on 26 April 1942; it was to remain with the division for the rest of the war. The division began landing in Normandy on 12 June 1944 (D-Day + 6) and participated in the North-West Europe Campaign. Equipped with Sexton self-propelled 25-pounder guns, the regiment gave support to the British and Canadian forces attacking Caen (First and Second Battle of the Odon). During Operation Martlet its Sextons supported 147th Brigade and C Squadron of the Sherwood Rangers Yeomanry in their attack on St Nicholas Farm. Later they were also in action around Le Havre (Operation Astonia) as part of the First Canadian Army, at the Turnhout Canal and in the Battle of the Scheldt. The winter of 1944-1945 was spent on the Dutch–German border along the River Maas. Their final action was at the Second Battle of Arnhem in April 1945.

The Regiment was placed in suspended animation after the war on 18 April 1946.

=== Post war ===
When the TA was reconstituted on 1 January 1947 143rd Fd Rgt was formally disbanded and 97th Fd Rgt reformed at Maidstone as 297 (Kent Yeomanry) Light Anti-Aircraft Regiment, RA. RHQ remained at Maidstone, and the regiment formed part of the TA's 44th (Home Counties) Division.

On 1 May 1961, the regiment was amalgamated with 3rd/4th County of London Yeomanry (Sharpshooters) to form Kent and County of London Yeomanry (Sharpshooters).

== Insignia ==
Upon conversion to artillery the regiment opted to wear the Royal Artillery cap and collar badges rather than their original yeomanry badges, although shoulder chains were authorised for wear on walking out dress for all ranks. During World War II special regimental pattern buttons for service dress were adopted by officers of 97 Field Regiment. These were flat, gilt, and engraved with the white horse of Kent over a scroll inscribed 'INVICTA' over the letters KY. Brass KY shoulder titles were worn on battledress by all ranks, and while in the Middle East officers wore a khaki drill slip-on shoulder strap below the rank badges with KY embroidered in white. An embroidered regimental arm badge consisting of the white horse on a black diamond was worn on the right arm by all ranks. The buttons, shoulder titles and arm badge continued to be worn after the war by 297 LAA Rgt until conversion to RAC in 1961.

== Battle Honours ==
The Kent Yeomanry was the custodian of the battle honours of The Royal East Kent Mounted Rifles (The Duke of Connaught's Own) and The West Kent Yeomanry (Queen's Own). (Note: These were: Second Boer War South Africa 1900–01 First World War Somme 1918, Bapaume 1918, Hindenburg Line, Épehy, Pursuit to Mons, France and Flanders 1918, Gallipoli 1915, Egypt 1916–17, Gaza, Jerusalem, Tell 'Asur, Palestine 1917–18)

Second World War

The Royal Artillery was present in nearly all battles and would have earned most of the honours awarded to cavalry and infantry regiments. In 1833, William IV awarded the motto Ubique (meaning "everywhere") in place of all battle honours.

== See also ==
- Yeomanry
- List of British Army Yeomanry Regiments converted to Royal Artillery
- Kent and Sharpshooters Yeomanry
- Royal Yeomanry

== Bibliography ==
- Bellis, Malcolm A. (1995). Regiments of the British Army 1939–1945 (Artillery). London: Military Press International. ISBN 0-85420-110-6.
- Forty, George (1998). British Army Handbook 1939–1945. Stroud, Gloucestershire: Sutton Publishing Limited. ISBN 0-7509-1403-3.
- J.B.M. Frederick, Lineage Book of British Land Forces 1660–1978, Vol I, Wakefield: Microform Academic, 1984, ISBN 1-85117-007-3.
- J.B.M. Frederick, Lineage Book of British Land Forces 1660–1978, Vol II, Wakefield: Microform Academic, 1984, ISBN 1-85117-009-X.
- James Holland, Brothers in Arms: One Legendary Tank Regiment's Bloody War from D-Day to VE-Day, London: Bantam, 2021, ISBN 978-1-78763394-0.
- Joslen, Lt-Col H.F. (1990) [1st. Pub. HMSO:1960]. Orders of Battle, Second World War, 1939–1945. London: London Stamp Exchange. ISBN 0-948130-03-2.
- Kempton, Chris (2003). 'Loyalty & Honour', The Indian Army September 1939 – August 1947. Vol. Part I Divisions. Milton Keynes: The Military Press. ISBN 0-85420-228-5.
- Norman E.H. Litchfield, The Territorial Artillery 1908–1988 (Their Lineage, Uniforms and Badges), Nottingham: Sherwood Press, 1992, ISBN 0-9508205-2-0.
- Mileham, Patrick (1994). The Yeomanry Regiments; 200 Years of Tradition. Edinburgh: Canongate Academic. ISBN 1-898410-36-4.
- War Office, Titles and Designations of Formations and Units of the Territorial Army, London: War Office, 7 November 1927 (RA sections also summarised in Litchfield, Appendix IV).

=== External links ===
- Derek Barton, Royal Artillery 1939–45
- T.F. Mills, Land Forces of Britain, the Empire and Commonwealth – Regiments.org (archive site)
- Graham Watson, The Territorial Army 1947
- "97 Field Regiment RA". Orders of Battle.com.
- "143 Field Regiment RA". Orders of Battle.com.
