= Kent and Sharpshooters Yeomanry =

- Cap badge of the Kent and Sharpshooters Yeomanry
- Active: 1 May 1961-
- Country: United Kingdom
- Branch: British Army
- Type: Yeomanry
- Role: Reconnaissance (1 squadron); Signals support (1 squadron)
- Size: 2 Squadrons
- Part of: Royal Armoured Corps (1 squadron); Royal Signals (1 squadron)
- Garrison/HQ: C (KSY) Squadron - Croydon; 265 (KCLY) Squadron - Bexleyheath

Insignia
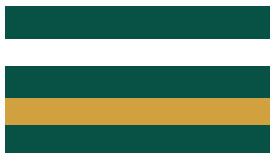
- Tactical Recognition Flash

The Kent and Sharpshooters Yeomanry was a unit of the Territorial Army ('TA') that was established in 1961 as the Kent and County of London Yeomanry (Sharpshooters). This was achieved through the merger of 297 (Kent Yeomanry) Regiment, Royal Artillery and 3rd/4th County of London Yeomanry (Sharpshooters).

== History ==
The unit was established in 1961 as the Kent and County of London Yeomanry (Sharpshooters) through the amalgamation of two yeomanry regiments: the 297 (Kent Yeomanry) Regiment, Royal Artillery and the 3rd/4th County of London Yeomanry (Sharpshooters). Initially, it served as an armoured reconnaissance regiment until 1967 when the Territorial Army (TA) underwent re-organization. Following the re-organization, the unit was disbanded and reconstituted as three separate units:

- 'C' Squadron, Royal Yeomanry
- 'R' Battery, The London and Kent Regiment, Royal Artillery
- 'A' Company, 8th Battalion, the Queen's Regiment

In 1969, the artillery battery was transformed into (265 London & Kent) Squadron, which became a part of 71 (Yeomanry) Signal Regiment of the Royal Signals. In 1971, the squadron was re-designated as 265 (Kent and County of London Yeomanry) Squadron, and in 1987, its lineage was transferred to HQ (Kent and County of London Yeomanry) Squadron, which was also a component of 71 (Yeomanry) Signal Regiment.

== Present day ==
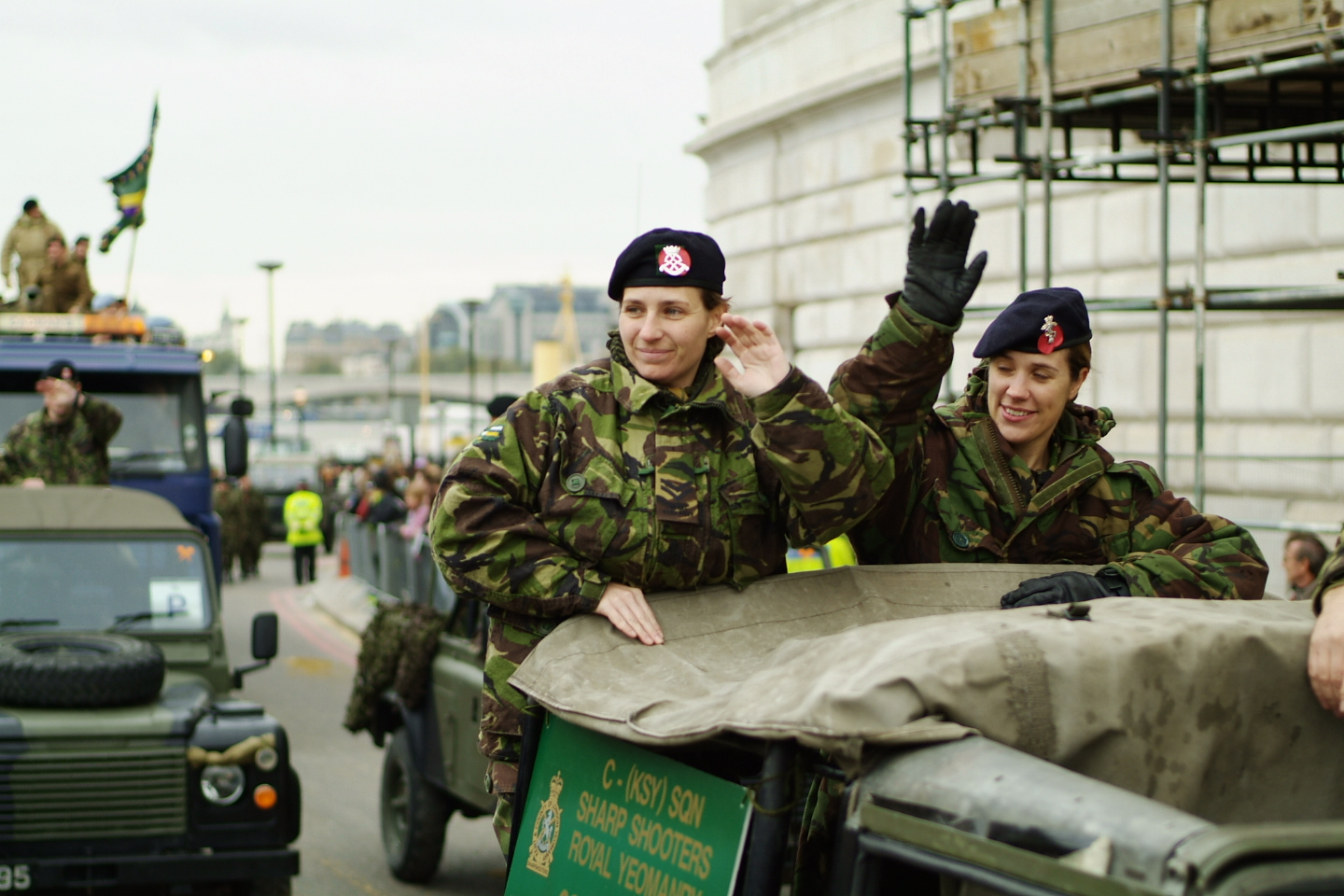
C (KSY) Squadron Royal Yeomanry, Lord Mayor's Show, London 2006

Today two squadrons retain the Sharpshooters name:

- 'C' (Kent and Sharpshooters Yeomanry) Squadron Royal Yeomanry.
- 265 (Kent & County of London Yeomanry (Sharpshooters)) Support Squadron, 71 (City of London) Yeomanry Signal Regiment.

== Regimental museum ==
The Kent and Sharpshooters Yeomanry Museum is at Hever Castle in Kent.

== Honorary Colonels ==
Honorary colonels have been:

- Colonel John Nevill, 5th Marquess of Abergavenny 1961–1962
- Major-General George Philip Bradley Roberts 1962–1970
- Colonel Sir William John Herbert de Wette Mullens 1970–1974
- Major-General The Rt. Hon. Gilbert Monckton, 2nd Viscount Monckton of Brenchley 1974–1979
- Lieutenant Robin Leigh-Pemberton, Baron Kingsdown 1979–1992
- Brigadier Sir Arthur Gooch 1992–2000
- Lieutenant-Colonel Julian Radcliffe 2000–2013
- Colonel Rt Hon Sir Nicholas Soames 2013-

== See also ==
- County of London Yeomanry

== Lineage ==
Lineage
Kent and Sharpshooters Yeomanry	297th (Kent Yeomanry) Light Anti-Aircraft Regiment	Royal East Kent Mounted Rifles (Duke of Connaught's Own)
Kent and Sharpshooters Yeomanry	297th (Kent Yeomanry) Light Anti-Aircraft Regiment	Queen's Own West Kent Yeomanry
Kent and Sharpshooters Yeomanry	3rd/4th County of London Yeomanry (Sharpshooters)	3rd County of London Yeomanry (Sharpshooters)
Kent and Sharpshooters Yeomanry	3rd/4th County of London Yeomanry (Sharpshooters)	4th County of London Yeomanry (Sharpshooters)

== Bibliography ==
- Mileham, Patrick (1994). The Yeomanry Regiments; 200 Years of Tradition. Edinburgh: Canongate Academic. ISBN 1-898410-36-4.
- Mollo, Boris, (1970). The Sharpshooters. The 3rd County of London Yeomanry and successor units 1900-1961. Kent and County of London Yeomanry 1961-1970, Historical Research Unit, London.
