= Warwickshire Yeomanry =

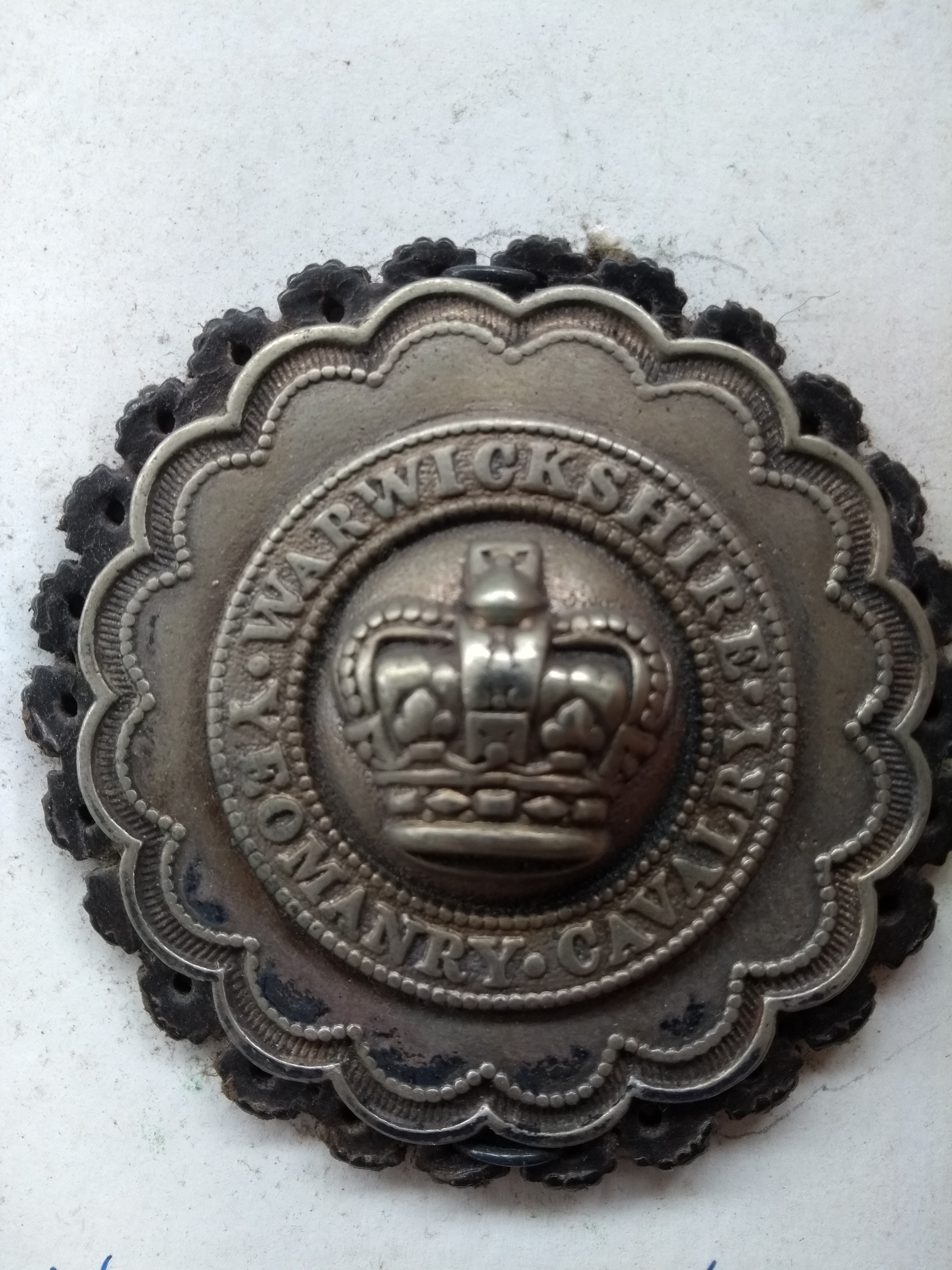
- Harness badge of the Warwickshire Yeomanry, c1880
- Active: 1794–Present
- Country: Kingdom of Great Britain (1794–1800); United Kingdom (1801–1956)
- Branch: British Army
- Type: Yeomanry
- Size: Regiment
- Part of: 1st South Midland Mounted Brigade (First World War); Royal Armoured Corps (Second World War)
- Engagements: Second Boer War; First World War Gallipoli 1915 Egypt 1915–17 Palestine 1917–18 France and Flanders 1918 Second World War Iraq 1941 Syria 1941 North Africa 1942 Italy 1944
- Battle honours: See battle honours below

The Warwickshire Yeomanry was a yeomanry regiment of the British Army, first raised in 1794, which served as cavalry and machine gunners in the First World War and as a cavalry and an armoured regiment in the Second World War, before being amalgamated into the Queen's Own Warwickshire and Worcestershire Yeomanry in 1956. The lineage is maintained by B (Warwickshire and Worcestershire Yeomanry) Squadron, part of The Royal Yeomanry.

== History ==
=== Formation and early history ===
The regiment was first formed as the Gentlemen and Yeomanry of Warwickshire in 1794, who raised four troops of yeomanry. These four troops were regimented in 1796 as the Warwickshire Regiment of Yeomanry Cavalry; the regiment expanded to a fifth troop in 1813, a sixth in 1831, and in 1854, with the Crimean War causing an upsurge in martial sentiment, two more troops were formed.

=== Second Boer War ===
The Yeomanry was not intended to serve overseas, but due to the string of defeats during Black Week in December 1899, the British government realized they were going to need more troops than just the regular army. A Royal Warrant was issued on 24 December 1899 to allow volunteer forces to serve in the Second Boer War. The Royal Warrant asked standing Yeomanry regiments to provide service companies of approximately 115 men each for the Imperial Yeomanry. The regiment provided the 5th (Warwickshire) Company for the 2nd Battalion in 1900 and the 103rd (Warwickshire) Company for the same battalion in 1901.

In 1901, the regiment was reorganised as mounted infantry as the Warwickshire Imperial Yeomanry. In 1908, it was transferred into the Territorial Force, returning to a cavalry role and equipped as hussars, under the new title of The Warwickshire Yeomanry. The regiment was based at Northgate Street in Warwick at this time.

=== First World War ===
In accordance with the Territorial and Reserve Forces Act 1907 (7 Edw. 7, c.9), which brought the Territorial Force into being, the TF was intended to be a home defence force for service during wartime and members could not be compelled to serve outside the country. However, on the outbreak of war on 4 August 1914, many members volunteered for Imperial Service. Therefore, TF units were split in August and September 1914 into 1st Line (liable for overseas service) and 2nd Line (home service for those unable or unwilling to serve overseas) units. Later, a 3rd Line was formed to act as a reserve, providing trained replacements for the 1st and 2nd Line regiments.

==== 1/1st Warwickshire Yeomanry ====
The regiment mobilised in August 1914, but remained in England until 1915, when they sailed for Egypt with 2nd Mounted Division. During the move, the horse transport Wayfarer was torpedoed on 11 April 1915 having just left Avonmouth; although she did not sink, the horses had to be rescued. Volunteers of the regiment saved 763 horses, receiving a Military Cross and twelve Meritorious Service Medals. They arrived in Egypt on 24 April, before being moved to Gallipoli for service as dismounted infantry. They landed at Suvla Bay on 18 August and saw action at the Battle of Scimitar Hill, on 21 August. The regiment took heavy losses, but remained in the line until withdrawn at the end of October. It was assigned to the Australian Mounted Division in February 1917, serving in Palestine as cavalry, and seeing action at the First and Second Battles of Gaza, the Charge at Huj as well as the Battle of Mughar Ridge and the Battle of Jerusalem. It was withdrawn in April 1918, and amalgamated with the 1/1st South Nottinghamshire Hussars into B Battalion, Machine Gun Corps, soon renamed the 100th (Warwickshire and South Nottinghamshire Yeomanry) Battalion, Machine Gun Corps, which would serve on the Western Front for the remainder of the war. On 27 May 1918 this unit was on board the transport vessel SS Leasowe Castle which was sunk by SM UB-51 with a loss of 101 lives. At the Armistice, it was serving as army troops with the Fourth Army.

==== 2/1st Warwickshire Yeomanry ====
The 2nd Line regiment was formed at Warwick in September 1914. In April 1915, it joined the 2/1st South Midland Mounted Brigade at Cirencester and in June moved to the King's Lynn area where the brigade joined the 2/2nd Mounted Division. On 14 July 1915, it was at Holkham and in October at Fakenham. On 31 March 1916, the remaining Mounted Brigades were ordered to be numbered in a single sequence and the brigade became the 10th Mounted Brigade (and the division 3rd Mounted Division) at Tunbridge Wells.

In July 1916, there was a major reorganization of 2nd Line yeomanry units in the United Kingdom. All but 12 regiments were converted to cyclists; the 2/1st Warwickshire Yeomanry remained mounted and transferred to the 1st Mounted Brigade in the new 1st Mounted Division (3rd Mounted Division redesignated) at Thorndon Park, Brentwood. In November, it was at Epping and in April 1917 back to Thorndon Park.

In September 1917, the regiment was also converted to cyclists and joined 214th Brigade in 71st Division at Colchester. This brigade was intended to serve at Murmansk. On 12 February 1918, the brigade joined the 67th Division, still at Colchester. In March, all fit men were posted to France and the Murmansk operation was cancelled. The regiment remained in East Anglia for the rest of the war.

==== 3/1st Warwickshire Yeomanry ====
The 3rd Line regiment was formed at Warwick in June 1915 and affiliated to the 4th Reserve Cavalry Regiment at Tidworth. In early 1917, it was absorbed into the 5th Reserve Cavalry Regiment, also at Tidworth.

=== Between the wars ===
Post war, a commission was set up to consider the shape of the Territorial Force (Territorial Army from 1 October 1921). The experience of the First World War made it clear that cavalry was surfeit. The commission decided that only the 14 most senior regiments were to be retained as cavalry (though the Lovat Scouts and the Scottish Horse were also to remain mounted as "scouts"). Eight regiments were converted to Armoured Car Companies of the Royal Tank Corps (RTC), one was reduced to a battery in another regiment, one was absorbed into a local infantry battalion, one became a signals regiment and two were disbanded. The remaining 25 regiments were converted to brigades (Note: The basic organic unit of the Royal Artillery was, and is, the Battery. When grouped together they formed brigades, in the same way that infantry battalions or cavalry regiments were grouped together in brigades. At the outbreak of the First World War, a field artillery brigade of headquarters (4 officers, 37 other ranks), three batteries (5 and 193 each), and a brigade ammunition column (4 and 154) had a total strength just under 800 so was broadly comparable to an infantry battalion (just over 1,000) or a cavalry regiment (about 550). Like an infantry battalion, an artillery brigade was usually commanded by a Lieutenant-Colonel. Artillery brigades were redesignated as regiments in 1938.) of the Royal Field Artillery between 1920 and 1922. As the 2nd most senior regiment in the order of precedence, the regiment was retained as horsed cavalry.

=== Second World War ===
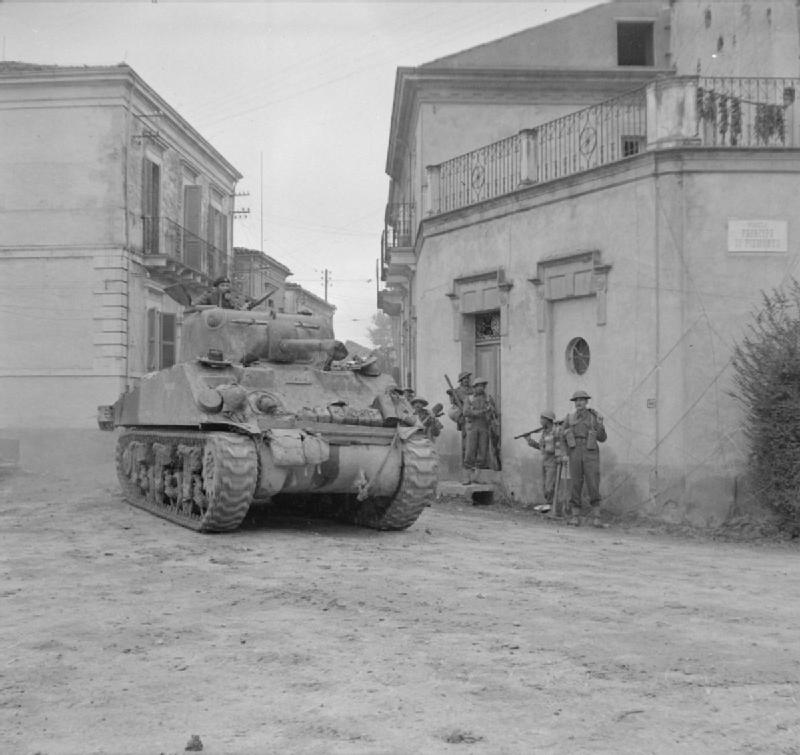
A Sherman tank of 'B' Squadron, Warwickshire Yeomanry, passing Indian infantry in Frisa, Italy, 14 December 1943.

The regiment did not mechanise before the outbreak of the Second World War; on mobilisation, it was attached to the 1st Cavalry Division, and moved in 1940 to the Middle East, where it saw service in Iraq and Syria in 1941. It was mechanised as an armoured regiment in late 1941 and transferred into the Royal Armoured Corps, with the division redesignating itself as 10th Armoured Division. The regiment then saw service in the North African Campaign, fighting at the Second Battle of El Alamein whilst attached to the 2nd New Zealand Division. It was deployed to Italy in 1944, where it saw action in the Italian Campaign in June and July.

=== Post-war ===
On 1 January 1947, the TA was reconstituted, and the regiment followed suite, reforming as the Warwickshire Yeomanry and was armed with tanks shortly afterwards. It was then placed directly under Northern Command and was reorganised into three squadrons:

- Regimental Headquarters, in Coventry
- B Squadron, in Warwick
- C Squadron, in Coventry
- D Squadron, in Stratford-upon-Avon

After formation, the regiment gained its affiliation with the 13th/18th Royal Hussars. This affiliation would continue into the Warwick and Worcs Yeomanry until the hussars' disbandment in 1992.

In 1956, the British Government announced its intention to reduce the size of the Territorial Army, due to its high running costs. One of the changes to be brought by this reorganisation was the merging of several yeomanry regiments into new larger regiments. Therefore, in November 1956 it was announced that the Warwickshire Yeomanry and the Queen's Own Worcestershire Hussars were to be amalgamated. In 1957, the regiment completed this transition and became known as the Queen's Own Warwickshire and Worcestershire Yeomanry.

== Battle honours ==
The Warwickshire Yeomanry was awarded the following battle honours (honours in bold are emblazoned on the regimental colours):

Second Boer War	**South Africa 1900–01**
First World War	**Hindenburg Line**, Épehy, **St Quentin Canal**, Beaurevoir, Selle, **Sambre**, **France and Flanders 1918**, Suvla, **Scimitar Hill**, **Gallipoli 1915**, Rumani, **Rafah**, **Egypt 1915–17**, **Gaza**, El Mughar, Nebi Samwil, Jerusalem, **Palestine 1917–18**
Second World War	**Iraq 1941**, **Syria 1941**, **El Alamein**, **North Africa 1942**, **Ficulle**, **Trasimene Line**, **Sanfatucchio**, **Advance to Florence**, **Campriano**, **Italy 1944**

== See also ==
- Imperial Yeomanry
- List of Yeomanry Regiments 1908
- Yeomanry
- Yeomanry order of precedence
- British yeomanry during the First World War
- Second line yeomanry regiments of the British Army

== Bibliography ==
- James, Brigadier E.A. (1978). British Regiments 1914–18. London: Samson Books Limited. ISBN 0-906304-03-2.
- Joslen, H. F. (2003) [1960]. Orders of Battle: Second World War, 1939–1945. Uckfield, East Sussex: Naval and Military Press. ISBN 978-1-84342-474-1.
- Mileham, Patrick (1994). The Yeomanry Regiments; 200 Years of Tradition. Edinburgh: Canongate Academic. ISBN 1-898410-36-4.
- Rinaldi, Richard A (2008). Order of Battle of the British Army 1914. Ravi Rikhye. ISBN 978-0-97760728-0.
- Order of Battle of the British Armies in France, November 11th, 1918. France: General Staff, GHQ. 1918.
- Frederick, J. B. M. (1984). Lineage book of British land forces 1660-1978 : biographical outlines of cavalry, yeomanry, armour, artillery, infantry, marines and air force land troops of regular and reserve forces (Volume I). Wakefield: Microform Academic. ISBN 978-1-85117-007-4. OCLC 18072764.
