= Territorial Force Imperial Service Badge =

British Army award

- The Imperial Service Badge
- Type: Badge
- Description: as follows: Ribbon = None; Metal = Cupro-nickel / white-metal; Size = 10mm by 43mm; Shape = Horizontal Bar surmounted by royal crown. Raised inscription: IMPERIAL SERVICE.
- Presented by: The United Kingdom
- Eligibility: Those officers, NCOs and men of the Territorial Force, who undertook liability in the event of national emergency, to serve in any place outside the United Kingdom, in accordance with the provisions of Section XIII (2) (a) of the Territorial and Reserve Forces Act, 1907.
- Campaigns: Pre-WW1 and First World War.
- Status: This award: Ceased to exist when the Territorial Force became the Territorial Army in 1921.
- Established: 1910

The Territorial Force Imperial Service Badge was a short-lived decoration of the United Kingdom awarded to those members of the Territorial Force (TF) who were prepared to serve outside the United Kingdom in defence of the Empire, in the event of national emergency. The conditions of enlistment for the TF laid down at their creation in 1908 did not allow for soldiers to be sent for service overseas against their will, as the TF was intended for home defence. However, any man could volunteer for the Imperial Service Section and serve abroad in times of war, which entitled him to wear this badge. The Imperial Service Obligation was introduced by Army Order 3 of January 1910 to allow territorials to volunteer in advance.

The badge was worn on the right breast of the uniform. It was not compulsory for the badge to be worn.

This badge became obsolete when the Territorial Force was elevated to become the Territorial Army.

== See also ==
- Territorial Force War Medal

== Bibliography ==
- Beckett, Ian Frederick William (2011). Britain's Part-Time Soldiers: The Amateur Military Tradition: 1558–1945. Barnsley, South Yorkshire: Pen & Sword Military. ISBN 9781848843950.
- Mussell, John, ed. (20 September 2014). Medal Yearbook 2015. Honiton, Devon: Token Publishing Ltd. ISBN 978-1-908828-17-0.
- Westlake, Ray (1991). British Territorial Units 1914-18. Men-at-Arms 245. Osprey Publishing. ISBN 978-1-85-532168-7.
