= Peter Caddick-Adams =

1960-born British academic historian and broadcaster

- Born: 1960 (age 65–66); London, England
- Education: University of Wolverhampton; Cranfield University
- Occupation: Historian
- Writing career
- Subject: Military history
- Military career
- Branch: British Army
- Rank: Major
- Units: Staffordshire Regiment; Queen's Own Mercian Yeomanry
- Conflicts: Iraq War
- Awards: Territorial Decoration

Peter Caddick-Adams TD, VR, FRHistS, FRGS (born 1960) is a British academic historian, author and broadcaster who is specialized in military history. He is known for books on 20th-century warfare, television work, and battlefield tours.

== Background ==
Peter Caddick-Adams is the son of John Caddick-Adams and Joy Mary Caddick-Adams (née Martin), and grandson of Major Charles Caddick-Adams, JP, all of Brampton Lodge, Newcastle-under-Lyme, in the county of Staffordshire. His grandfather and great-uncle, Captain Thomas Geoffrey Caddick-Adams, were awarded the Military Cross during World War I serving with the North Staffordshire Regiment.

== Military career ==
Caddick-Adams was born in Chelsea, and educated between 1974 and 1978 at Shrewsbury School in Shropshire. He then attended the Royal Military Academy Sandhurst, where he studied under Professor Richard Holmes, later his director and mentor at Cranfield University. He was commissioned into the Staffordshire Regiment, a regular regiment of the British Army, in 1979. This was a regiment in which several family members had served. He joined The Queen's Own Mercian Yeomanry (amalgamated in 1992 into The Royal Mercian and Lancastrian Yeomanry), a cavalry unit of the British Territorial Army, in 1985, was promoted captain in 1994 and major in 2000. He was awarded the Territorial Decoration in 1998.

In 1996–1997, Caddick-Adams was mobilised as an army reservist and served as the official NATO and SHAPE Historian in Bosnia with the Implementation Force (IFOR) and Stabilisation Force (SFOR) peace keeping missions, based in Sarajevo. He was attached to the staff of the US commander, General William W. Crouch. He wrote about some of his experiences in 1998.

In 2003, Caddick-Adams served in Operation Telic, during the Iraq War, with the Media Operations Group as a mobilised Reservist, based at CENTCOM in Qatar and later in Basra, where he was on the staff of the UK Contingent commander (Air Marshal Brian Burridge) and at the USAF Tallil Air Base at Nasiriyah, near the ancient city of Ur, which he visited. He also reported for The Sandy Times forces newspaper.

== Academic career ==
Caddick-Adams read War Studies and History at The University of Wolverhampton, graduating with a first class honours degree in 1997, and was awarded his PhD by Cranfield University in 2007.

He is currently director of the Defence & Global Security Institute (DGSI) and visiting lecturer at the Centre for Historical Research, School of Social, Historical & Political Studies, University of Wolverhampton.

In 2003 Caddick-Adams provided expert witness testimony to the International Criminal Tribunal for Rwanda. He has been a member of the British Commission for Military History since 1995 and the International Guild of Battlefield Guides since 2004. He has led more than 500 battlefield tours since 1984 for groups of civilians, military personnel, politicians, veterans and royalty. In 2010, Caddick-Adams was elected a Fellow of the Royal Historical Society (FRHistS), and in 2017 became a Fellow of the Royal Geographical Society (FRGS). He was a Member of the Education and Learning Committee of Waterloo 200, research consultant to the Fields of Battle, Lands of Peace 14–18 photographic project, and serves as a consultant for Royal Mail commemorative stamp issues and is an honorary patron of the annual Chalke Valley History Festival. He is also a member of the American Historical Association, the Society for Military History, and the Battlefields Trust.

== Journalism and filmography ==
Apart from his books, Caddick-Adams has made podcasts or written for The Daily Telegraph, The Independent, The Sunday Times, The Daily Mirror, The Wall Street Journal, The Field, BBC History Magazine, Britain at War magazine, History Today, The American, The Week, and BBC online publications. He commentates for BBC News, Sky News and Euronews on national events, current defence issues and military history. Caddick-Adams has contributed to numerous documentaries, including Battlefield Detectives (2004/5), The 100 Greatest War Films (2005), 21st Century Warfare (2007), Weaponology (2007), Wilfred Owen: A Remembrance Tale (2007), Battle of Britain: The Real Story (2010), Combat Countdown (2012), The Battle for Malta (2013), Normandy '44: The Battle Beyond D-Day (2014), Nazi Megastructures (2016), Gary Lineker: My Grandad's War (2019), Frontlines (2020), World War II By Drone (2020) and Decoded (2020). In 1994, Caddick-Adams introduced the BBC Radio 4 five-part series Book of the Week: Countdown To D-Day. In 2012, it was announced that he would be the historical consultant for a forthcoming movie about the Battle of Monte Cassino, to be directed by John Irvin. Caddick-Adams introduced the game Company of Heroes: Ardennes Assault on its release in 2014.

== Authorship ==
His 2011 work, Monty and Rommel: Parallel Lives about Field Marshals Bernard Montgomery and Erwin Rommel was praised by historian Michael Korda in The Daily Beast for ‘its readability and very rare fair-mindedness’. Andro Linklater writing in The Spectator assessed it a "discursive and highly rewarding book". In 2012 Caddick-Adams published Monte Cassino: Ten Armies in Hell, which was assessed by The Washington Post as ‘an excellent account of one of the bloodiest and most violent battles in human history’. Alexander Rose, writing in The Wall Street Journal called it ‘exceptional’. It has since been translated into Polish, Italian and Spanish. It was shortlisted as British Army Military Book of the Year for 2012.

Caddick-Adams wrote a trilogy of books about the Western Front. The books were published out of order chronologically with the first book about the Battle of the Bulge, the second about D-Day, and the last concerning the final 100 days of the war. In reviewing Snow and Steel, on the Battle of The Bulge, Chris Bellamy of the University of Greenwich observed that ‘Caddick-Adams is probably the best military historian of his generation, combining a sweeping command of politics and strategy with authoritative detail worthy of Ian Fleming’. Sir Max Hastings in The Sunday Times wrote that ‘Caddick-Adams knows more about the Bulge than any other historian I have read...I admire his originality. Snow and Steel offers an authoritative narrative of the drama.’ In National Geographic magazine, Caddick-Adams explained why he felt Hitler was influenced by the 19th century opera composer Richard Wagner for his 1944 attack. "In Wagner's operas, a huge amount of the action takes place in woods and forests. This taps into old Nordic mythology – that woods are a place of testing for human beings. So it was no accident that the attack against the Americans was launched from large forests, in heavy fog."

In 2019, Sand & Steel was released for the 75th anniversary of the Normandy landings, about which Trevor Royle in The Herald wrote that it ‘is destined to become a standard work on this iconic battle, and it well deserves that accolade’. Jerry D. Lenaburg, writing in the New York Journal of Books noted the work questioned "many of the long-held myths of D-Day. This critique is long overdue and actually adds value to the overall narrative as these myths are either corrected or validated." It was shortlisted for British Army Military Book of the Year 2020, the Templer Medal of the Society for Army Historical Research, and the RUSI Duke of Wellington Medal for Military History, 2020.

In 2022, he published Fire & Steel: The End of World War Two in the West, covering the final 100 days of the Second World War on the Western Front.

== Publications ==
- By God They Can Fight: A History of The 143rd Infantry Brigade, 1908–1995 (British Army, 1995)
- The Fight For Iraq (The Army Benevolent Fund, 2004) ISBN 978-0951822920
- Monty and Rommel: Parallel Lives (Preface Random House, 2011) ISBN 978-1590207253
- Monte Cassino: Ten Armies in Hell (Preface Random House, 2012) ISBN 978-0199974641
- Snow & Steel: The Battle of The Bulge 1944–45 (Preface Random House, 2014) ISBN 978-1848094284
- Sand & Steel: A New History of D-Day (Hutchinson, 2019) ISBN 978-1847948281
- Fire & Steel: The End of World War Two in the West (Oxford University Press, 2022) ISBN 978-0190601867
  - UK: 1945: Victory in the West (Hutchinson/Heinemann, 2022) ISBN 978-1529151701

== Contributor ==
- Russell Phillips, Daring and Determined: The First British Paratroop Raid (Shilka, 2027) Foreword.
- Russell Phillips, A Strange Campaign: The Battle for Madagascar (Shilka, 2021) Foreword.
- The Prime Ministers, 1721–2020: Three Hundred Years of Political Leadership, ed. Iain Dale & Mark Fox (Hutchinson, 2020) Chapter on Winston Churchill.
- Anthony Tucker-Jones, The Devil's Bridge – The German Victory at Arnhem, 1944 (Osprey, 2020) Foreword.
- Rudolf Böhmler, Monte Cassino: A German View (Pen & Sword, 2015) Foreword.
- David Martin, Londoners on the Western Front: The 58th (2/1st London) Division on the Western Front (Pen & Sword, 2014) Foreword.
- The First World War Story (BBC History, 2014)
- A Reader's Guide to Military History (Routledge, 2013) Three essays.
- Europe Since 1914: The Encyclopaedia of the Age of War and Reconstruction (Scribner's, 2006) Three essays
- "The Relevance & Role of the Battlefield Tour and Staff Ride in the 21st Century" (Strategic & Combat Studies Institute, 2005) II. Footprints in the Mud: The British Army’s Approach to the Battlefield Tour Experience, Defence Studies, 5:1, 15–26, DOI: 10.1080/14702430500096368
- Oxford Companion to Military History (Oxford, 2001) 120 entries.
- One Hundred Years of Conflict: 1900–2000 (Sutton, 2001) Chapter.
- The Battle of France and Flanders: Sixty Years On (Leo Cooper, 2001) Two chapters.
- Human Resource Management in the Armed Forces (Frank Cass, 2001) Chapter.
- The Great World War 1914–45: Volume 2 Who Won? Who Lost? The Peoples' Experience (Collins, 2001) Chapter on Serbia and Yugoslavia.
