= Royal Yeomanry =

British Army reserve regiment

The Royal Yeomanry
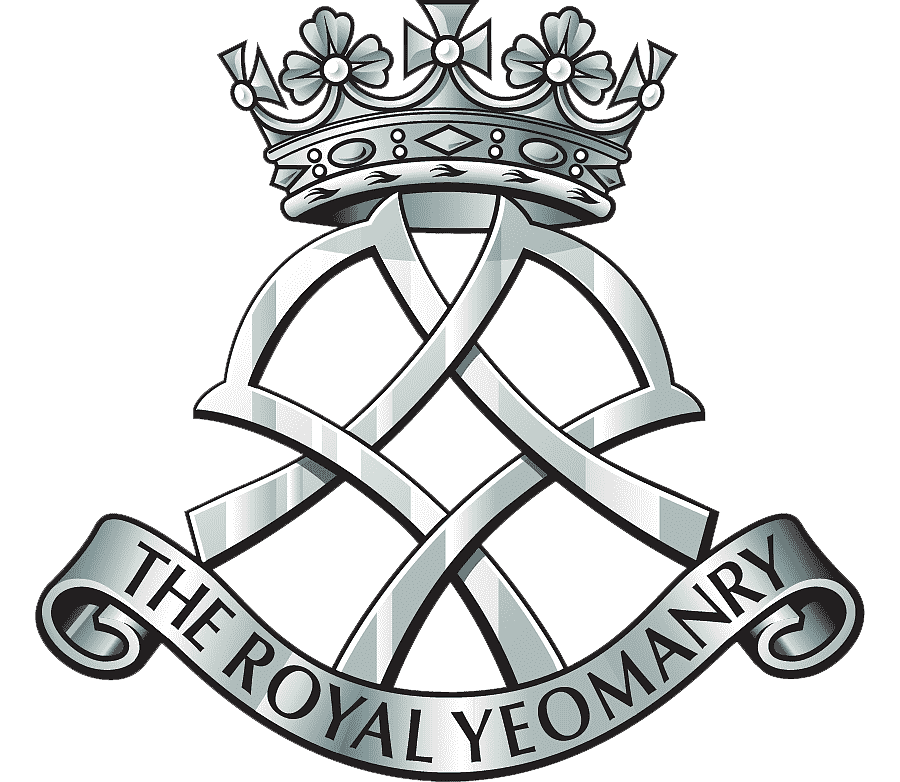
- The Royal Yeomanry cap badge
- Active: 1 April 1967–Present
- Allegiance: United Kingdom
- Branch: British Army
- Type: Yeomanry
- Role: Light Cavalry
- Size: Regiment
- Part of: Royal Armoured Corps
- Garrison/HQ: Regimental HQ, in Leicester
- March: The Farmers Boy
- Engagements: Iraq 2003

Commanders
- Current commander: Lt Col Mathew Bonner
- Royal Honorary Colonel: Princess Alexandra, The Honourable Lady Ogilvy
- Honorary Colonel: Maj Gen Simon Brooks-Ward

Insignia
- Tactical Recognition Flash

- Brigade Insignia
- Paired unit: 1st The Queen's Dragoon Guards

The Royal Yeomanry (RY) is the senior reserve cavalry regiment of the British Army. Equipped with Supacat Jackal variants, their role is to conduct mounted and dismounted formation reconnaissance. The Regimental Headquarters is located in Leicester, with squadrons in Fulham, Nottingham, Dudley, Croydon, Telford (with an outstation in Cardiff), and Leicester. The regiment is part of the Royal Armoured Corps and is the only reserve cavalry regiment to resubordinate into regular brigade as part of the Future Soldier reforms published in March 2021. The Royal Yeomanry is the only British Army reserve unit to have been awarded a battle honour since the Second World War.

== History ==
=== Formation and succession ===
The Royal Yeomanry Regiment (Volunteers) was raised on 1 April 1967, after the Territorial Army was disbanded the previous day under the Reserve Forces Act 1966 and replaced by a newly constituted organisation, the TAVR (Territorial and Army Volunteer Reserve).

The Royal Yeomanry Regiment (Volunteers) was in TAVR II. For four years, it was the only Royal Armoured Corps yeomanry reserve regiment: hence its generic name. In 1971, three new RAC Yeomanry regiments (the Queen's Own Yeomanry, the Mercian Yeomanry and the Wessex Yeomanry) were raised and the Royal Yeomanry's name was shortened to its current one; the opportunity to give it a more distinctive name was missed. The Queen's Own Yeomanry was given the same NATO role as the Royal Yeomanry, while the other two were Home Defence light reconnaissance.

=== The Cold War ===
The Royal Yeomanry's role during the Cold War was medium armoured reconnaissance. Its primary task was to operate as a mobile force to protect the massive, widespread logistic assets of the Corps, and certain key bridges against covert attacks and airborne descents by Soviet special forces. In addition it trained to perform the full range of medium armoured reconnaissance tasks for general war. The Royal Yeomanry was equipped with armoured cars, first Saladin, Saracen and Ferret, then Fox, Spartan and Sultan. Each squadron had an establishment (maximum number of personnel) of around 120, operated 30 armoured vehicles and around 15 soft-skinned vehicles and was supported by a team of 11 regular army instructors and five local civilian staff.

Squadrons were listed in 1990 as:

- "A" Squadron: Trowbridge, Wilts
- "B" Squadron: Nottingham
- "C" Squadron: Croydon, Surry

=== Nineties ===
The 'peace dividend' review of the Armed Forces ('Options for Change') which followed the end of the Cold War saw substantial changes to the Royal Yeomanry's role, equipment and establishment. These were justified by the then Secretary of State for Defence on the basis of a perceived "need to adapt [the Territorial Army's] roles to support and complement the new roles of the regular army. Under the previous strategy, it had important roles defending positions close to the previous West German border in support of the substantial British stationed forces. Clearly this task is no longer relevant in a unified Germany and under the new NATO strategy of greater flexibility and mobility. Instead, new opportunities arise to be part of the Rapid Reaction Corps and in national defence, and it is for these new roles and responsibilities that the Territorial Army units must now be structured and trained."

As a result, in 1992 the Royal Yeomanry was reduced in status and function to align with what were by then four other RAC yeomanry regiments and become national defence light reconnaissance, converting from armour to the Scout Land Rover and reducing in establishment by half, to between 50 and 60 personnel per squadron. At this time, the Royal Yeomanry lost two squadrons to the Queen's Own Yeomanry (one in Nottingham, which later returned to the regiment, and the other in Northern Ireland) and gained one (in Leicester).

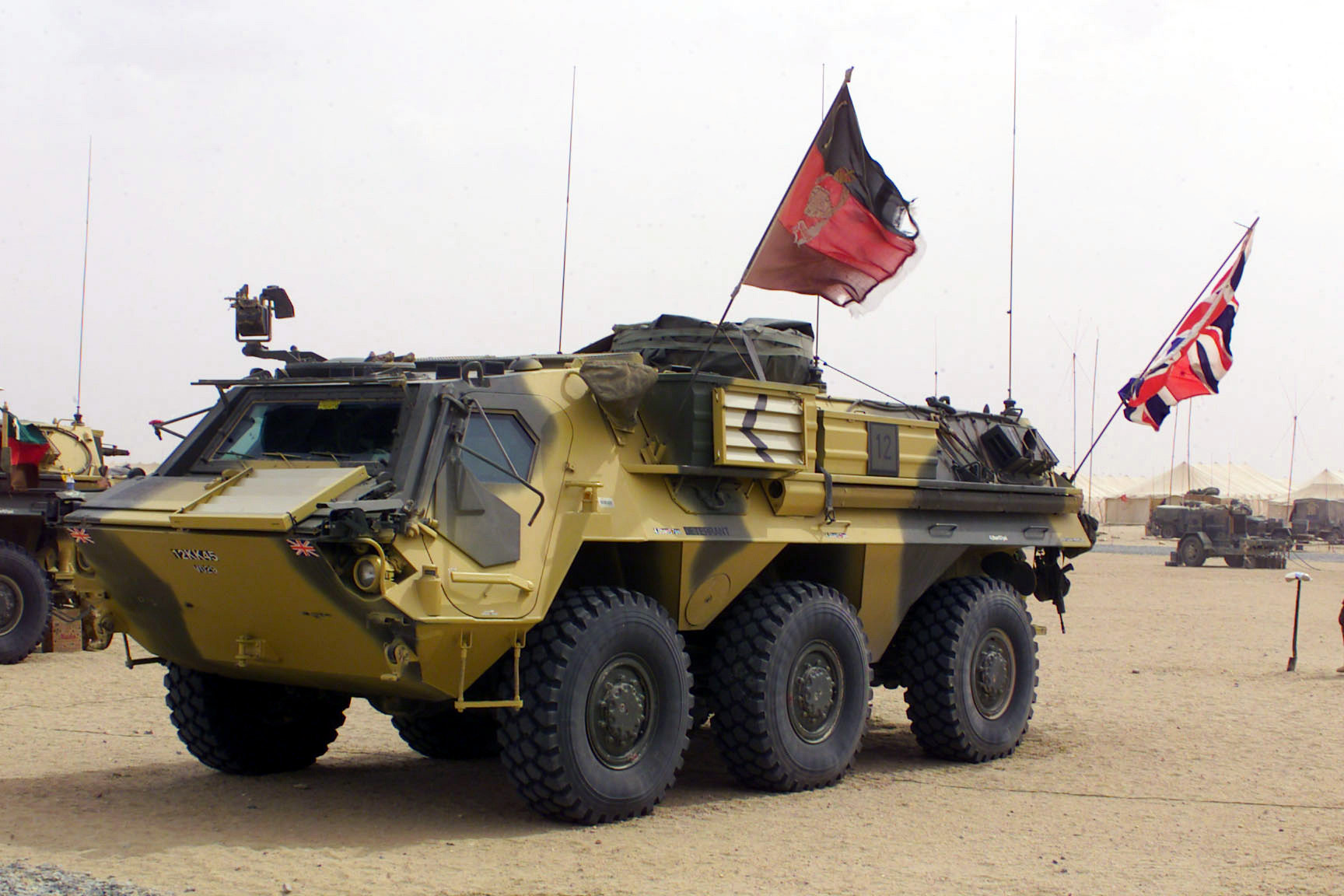
Fuchs CBRN Reconnaissance Vehicle

The Royal Yeomanry's national defence role encompassed a wide spectrum of possible operational uses. They included NATO, United Nations and national operations worldwide, as well as military aid to the civil authorities in the United Kingdom and military home defence. However, the role was perceived to be ill-defined and too broad a set of potential outputs to train against using limited resources. At a time when the Territorial Army was under continuing pressure to reduce in size and capabilities, this was regarded as potentially imperilling the regiment's existence. A more definite role that would address a clear Defence requirement was needed. Consequently, in 1996 the Royal Yeomanry accepted the role of being the British Army's only specialist nuclear, biological and chemical defence regiment, taking on the 11 Fuchs CBRN reconnaissance vehicles which had been acquired by the British Army during the 1990 Gulf War.

The Royal Yeomanry served exclusively in the CBRN (or NBC) role from 1996 until 1999. During this time, its first operational deployments began. On 1 April 1999, on the recommendation of the Strategic Defence Review, the Joint Chemical, Biological, Radiological and Nuclear Regiment (originally, the Joint NBC Regiment) was formed as a joint regular Army and Royal Air Force unit composed of four squadrons of the 1st Royal Tank Regiment and 27 Squadron Royal Air Force Regiment. The Royal Yeomanry was therefore reconfigured and partly re-roled. Two of the Royal Yeomanry's squadrons (A and W) were retained in the CBRN role to provide reserves for the new Joint NBC Regiment. The three non-CBRN squadrons converted to Challenger 2 to serve as reserves for armoured regiments. The establishment of each squadron was increased to 80–90. The regiment lost D (Berkshire Yeomanry) Squadron in Slough to disbandment but regained S (Sherwood Rangers Yeomanry) Squadron in Nottingham from the Queen's Own Yeomanry.

=== 2000s to Present ===
In 2006, as a result of the changes to the Territorial Army triggered by the Future Army Structure unveiled by the Ministry of Defence in 2004, the Royal Yeomanry's role ceased to be split between CBRN and Challenger 2 reserves. It was consolidated into a single role: 'formation CBRN reconnaissance'. In practice, this meant continuing to train as CBRN specialists and as RAC crew using the Scout Land Rover as a surrogate training platform, while also training as CVR(T) crew. This change paved the way for the uplift of each squadron's vehicle fleet to include two CVR(T) Spartan armoured fighting vehicles for training purposes. Soldiers and officers of the Royal Yeomanry then began to deploy to Afghanistan on Operation HERRICK as Scimitar, Spartan and Samaritan gunners, drivers and loaders.

Since 2013 the Royal Yeomanry has been a reserve light cavalry regiment. In that year, under the Reserves in the Future Force 2020 White Paper and the reserves basing plan announced by the Secretary of State for Defence on 5 July 2013, the regiment was paired with 1st The Queen's Dragoon Guards (QDG). On 24 February 2015, as part the same Army 2020 reorganisation programme, the Royal Yeomanry was transferred from under the command of Headquarters London District to that of 7th Infantry Brigade and Headquarters East within 1st (United Kingdom) Division as the brigade switched from its armour role into that of an infantry brigade and regional point of command. The regiment gained two squadrons (in Telford and Dudley) of the disbanded Royal Mercian and Lancastrian Yeomanry but lost a squadron (in Swindon) to the Royal Wessex Yeomanry under the Army 2020 reforms.

Under Army 2020 (Refine), it was confirmed that the Royal Yeomanry would (exceptionally) retain all six of its squadrons, two of which had been under threat of deletion under the 2013 plan. It was also confirmed that the squadron which the regiment had lost to the Royal Wessex Yeomanry would also be retained at squadron size. Furthermore, as a result of the ongoing 2021 Future Soldier (British Army) reforms, the Royal Yeomanry was resubordinated to the 3rd (United Kingdom) Division under the newly raised 3rd Deep Reconnaissance Strike Brigade with the restructure due to be complete by October 2023.

The Royal Yeomanry's current light cavalry role is to provide a rapidly deployable force with fast mobility and substantial firepower as part of the British Army's combat arm. Its soldiers provide reconnaissance, reassurance, security and, if the situation demands it, decisive tactical effects by raiding and attacking the enemy.

== Operational Deployments ==
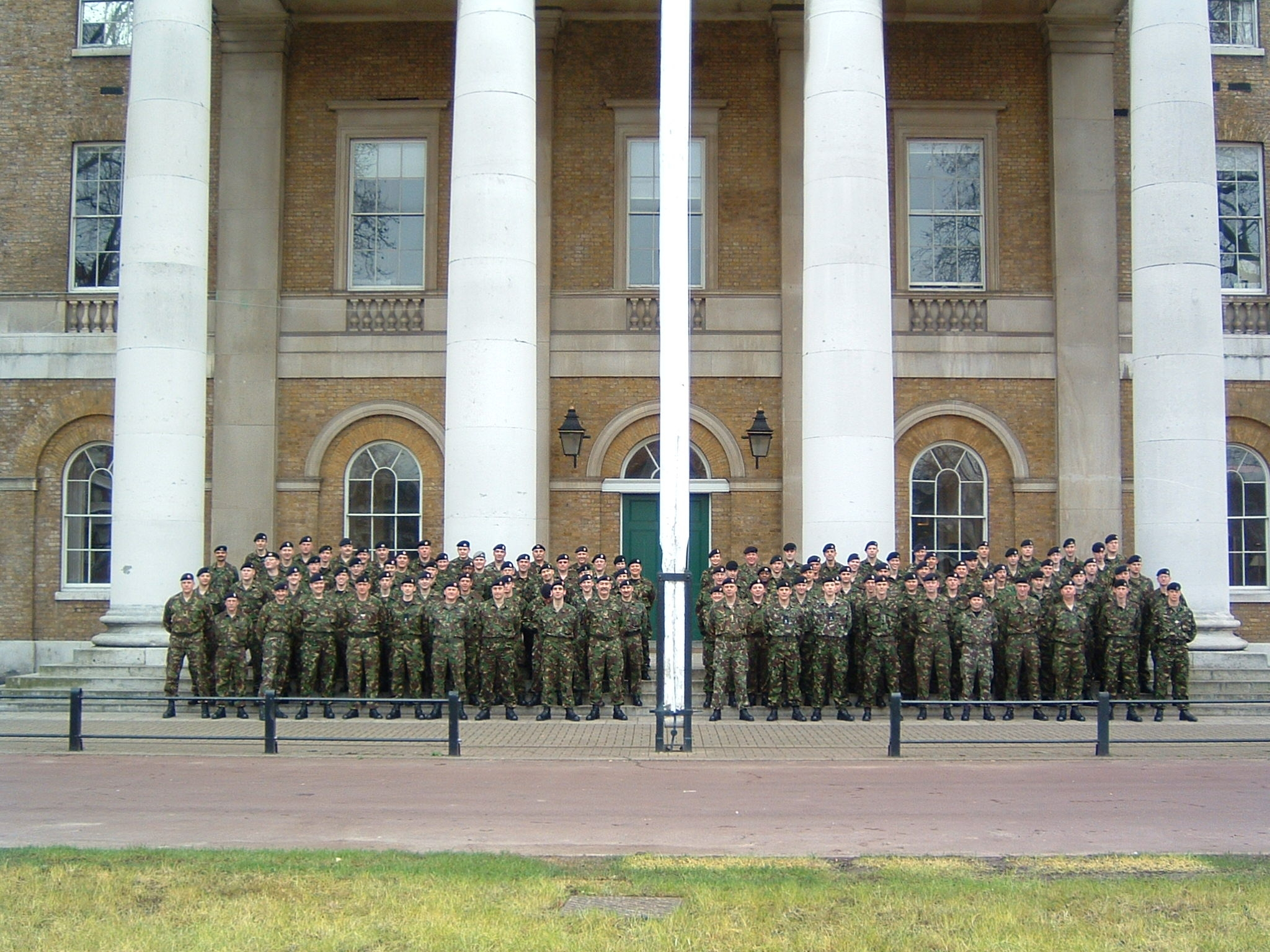
Y Squadron at the Duke of York's HQ, Chelsea, January 2003

The Royal Yeomanry's first operational deployment was in 1998 as CBRN/NBC specialists, to Kuwait. Some 35 members of the regiment deployed in August 1998 to set up biological detection systems in advance of Operation DESERT FOX (the Bombing of Iraq (1998)) and stayed on as part of Operation BOLTON. Between 1998 and 2002, some 44 members of the regiment deployed on operations to Kuwait, Bosnia & Herzegovina (Operation PALATINE) and Kosovo (Operation AGRICOLA).

In January 2003, A (Royal Wiltshire Yeomanry) and W (Westminster Dragoons) Squadrons were mobilised together with the Regimental Headquarters for Operation TELIC, the war in Iraq. The two squadrons were amalgamated with a number of augmentees from the other three squadrons of the Royal Yeomanry and from 160 Transport Regiment Royal Logistic Corps to form a much-enlarged "Y" Squadron comprising 116 personnel, which deployed as part of the Joint NBC Regiment. Despite being held at 180 days' notice for mobilisation, the Royal Yeomanry deployed to the operational theatre by 4 March 2003, three months after the commanding officer had received a warning order and less than six weeks after those who mobilised had received their call-out notices. This was the first deployment of a formed TA unit (TA soldiers under TA command) for combat operations since the Suez Crisis in 1956.

During the warfighting phase, formed complete troops (an officer and 12 soldiers) of the Royal Yeomanry were attached to 16 Air Assault Brigade, 7 Armoured Brigade (the Desert Rats) and 3 Commando Brigade for the invasion as NBC specialists. The remainder of the squadron had responsibility for NBC support to 1st (United Kingdom) Armoured Division's rear area. The Regimental Headquarters was detached from 1st (United Kingdom) Armoured Division to the US 75th Exploitation Task Force and Coalition Force Land Component Command to act as the liaison between the UK and US NBC efforts throughout the theatre of operations. Once the war-fighting phase was over, Y Sqn reverted to being under the operational command of Commanding Officer Royal Yeomanry and undertook peace support operations to the north of Al-Qurnah following a relief-in-place with elements of 16 Air Assault Brigade.

The Royal Yeomanry maintained a constant presence in Iraq from March 2003 until the end of Operation TELIC, including a substantial deployment on Op TELIC 4 of 53 members of the non-NBC squadrons to augment the Queen's Royal Lancers and 1st Battalion the Princess of Wales' Royal Regiment, serving principally as infantry but also in the armoured role.

From 2007 to 2014, the Royal Yeomanry also provided officers and soldiers for Operation HERRICK in Afghanistan, including a deployment of seven soldiers on Operation HERRICK 7 (one of whom, Corporal James Dunsby, served as gunner in HRH Prince Harry's armoured fighting vehicle).

In 2018, the Royal Yeomanry undertook its first operational deployments with its paired regular regiment, the 1st The Queen's Dragoon Guards, sending 3 officers and 11 soldiers on Operation CABRIT 3 and 4 to Poland as part of NATO's Enhanced Forward Presence.

== Recruitment ==
The Royal Yeomanry mainly recruits from Greater London, Nottinghamshire, Staffordshire, Warwickshire, Leicestershire, Derbyshire, Kent, Shropshire and Worcestershire.

== Training ==
Army Reserve soldiers with no previous military service complete the Common Military Syllabus (Reserves) course, also known as Phase 1 training. After completing Phase 1, soldiers in the Royal Yeomanry move on to "special-to-arm" (Phase 2) training as light cavalry soldiers. This consists of courses in gunnery (Heavy Machine Gun and General Purpose Machine Gun), signals (Bowman communication system), and driving (Land Rover RWMIK and Supacat Jackal) delivered by the Royal Yeomanry by Army Reserve soldiers and also by Regular Army instructors in centres such as the Armour Centre. In addition, field training exercises develop tactics and situational awareness, as well as the ability to operate away from base for long periods. Royal Yeomanry soldiers also undertake training in dismounted close combat (which includes rifle marksmanship and physical fitness training).

The training commitment for the Army Reserve Light Cavalry is around 40 reserve service days per year. This normally consists of a 16-day consolidated training period plus (typically) at least four 2.5-day weekends throughout the year, as well as one weekday evening (0.25 days) per week. The light cavalry role is physically arduous and members of the Royal Yeomanry are required to meet the Army Reserve Ground Close Combat fitness standards, so Royal Yeomanry officers and soldiers are required to undertake physical fitness training in their own time in addition to what is provided to them by physical training instructors.

== Equipment ==
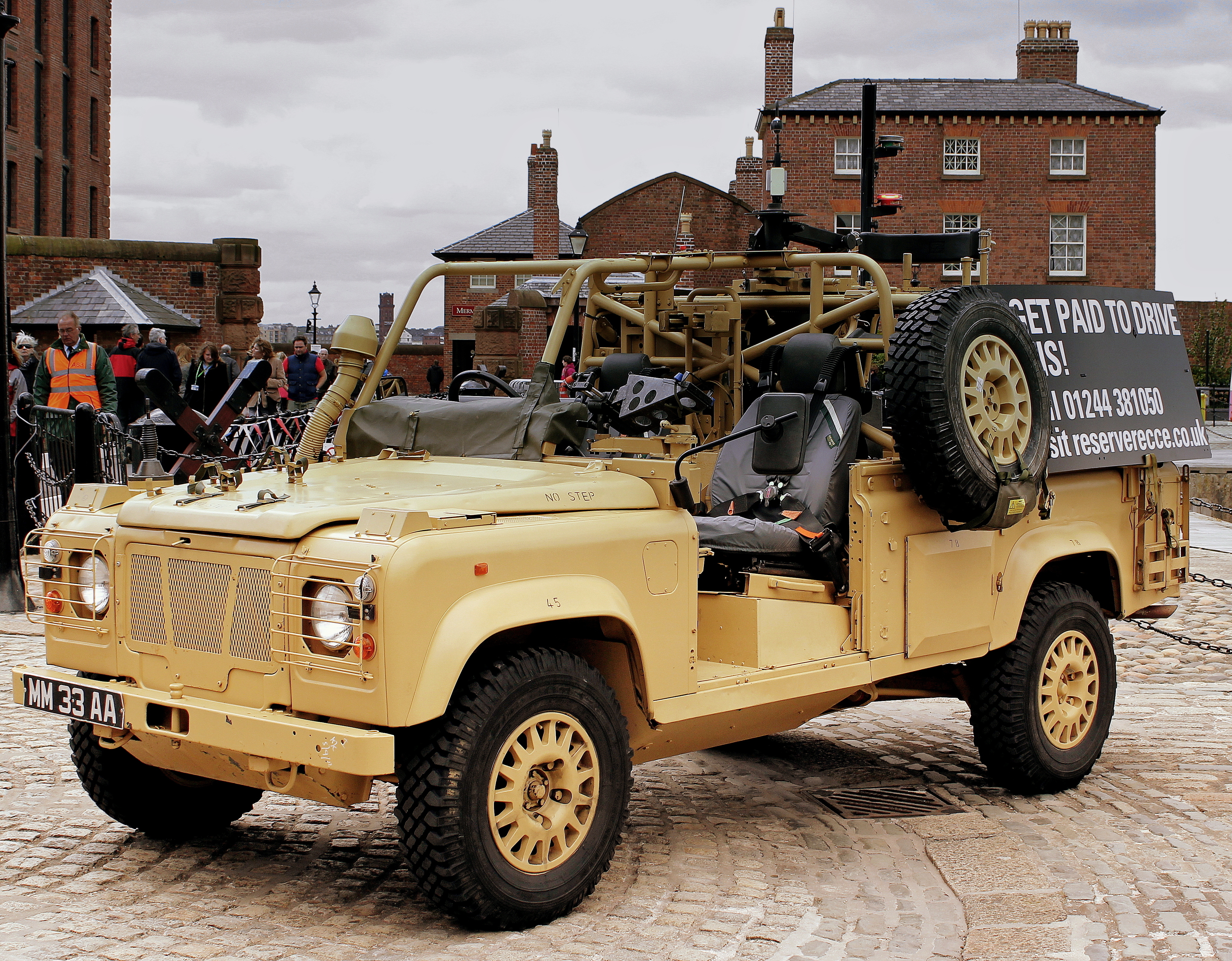
A static British Army WMIK on display.

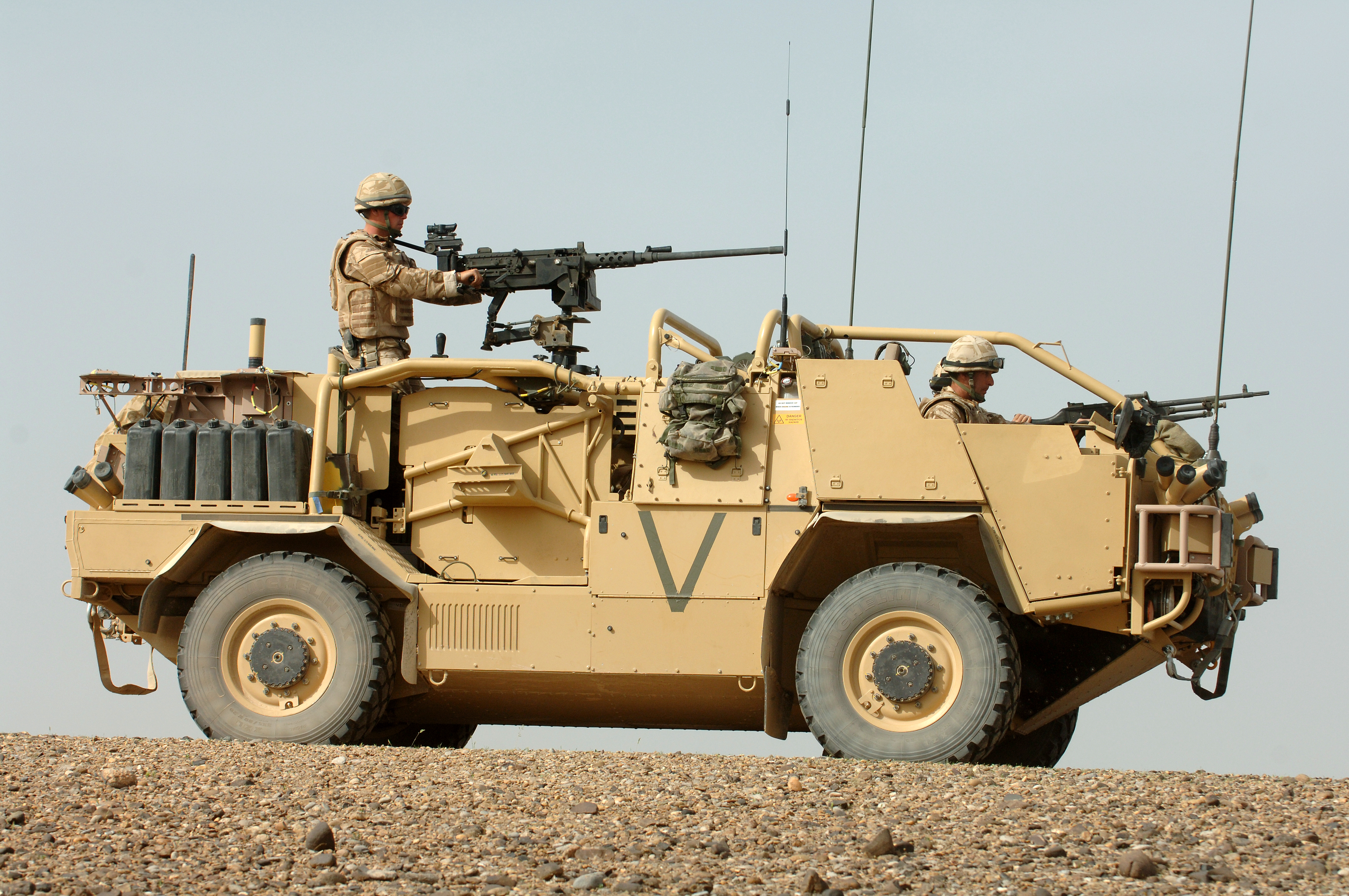
Supacat Jackal

The regiment's main equipment is the Supacat Jackal, a light armoured vehicle equipped with the General Purpose Machine Gun (GPMG) and the Browning M2 .50 Heavy Machine Gun (HMG).

== Organisation ==
The Royal Yeomanry is one of the two light cavalry regiments in 3rd Deep Reconnaissance Strike Brigade, which in turn is part of 3rd (United Kingdom) Division. The other light cavalry regiment is the Queen's Dragoon Guards, the regiment's paired unit.

The regiment's current organisation (following 2021 changes) is as follows:

- Regimental Headquarters, in South Wigston, Leicester (moved from Fulham)
- A (Sherwood Rangers Yeomanry) Squadron, in Carlton, Nottingham
- B (Staffordshire, Warwickshire and Worcestershire Yeomanry) Squadron, at Alamein House, Dudley – formerly B (Staffordshire, Warwick, and Worcs Yeo) Sqn
- C (Kent and Sharpshooters Yeomanry) Squadron, at The Barracks, Croydon
- D (Shropshire Yeomanry) Squadron, in Telford
  - Cardiff Troop, in Cardiff (formed in 2021)
- E (Leicestershire and Derbyshire Yeomanry) Squadron, in South Wigston, Leicester
- F (Westminster Dragoons) Squadron, at Fulham House, Fulham, London

=== Band ===
The Inns of Court and City Yeomanry provides the regimental band, a tradition dating back to the late 1960s. It was formed in 1961 following the amalgamation of the two regiments. It is one of only two Army Reserve Bands in London with the status of "State Band". The band is currently based at Holderness House in London. They undertake activities overseas, including providing musical support to regimental celebrations in France and Belgium, and training the musicians of the Military Band Institute of the Armed Forces of Saudi Arabia.

== Battle Honours ==
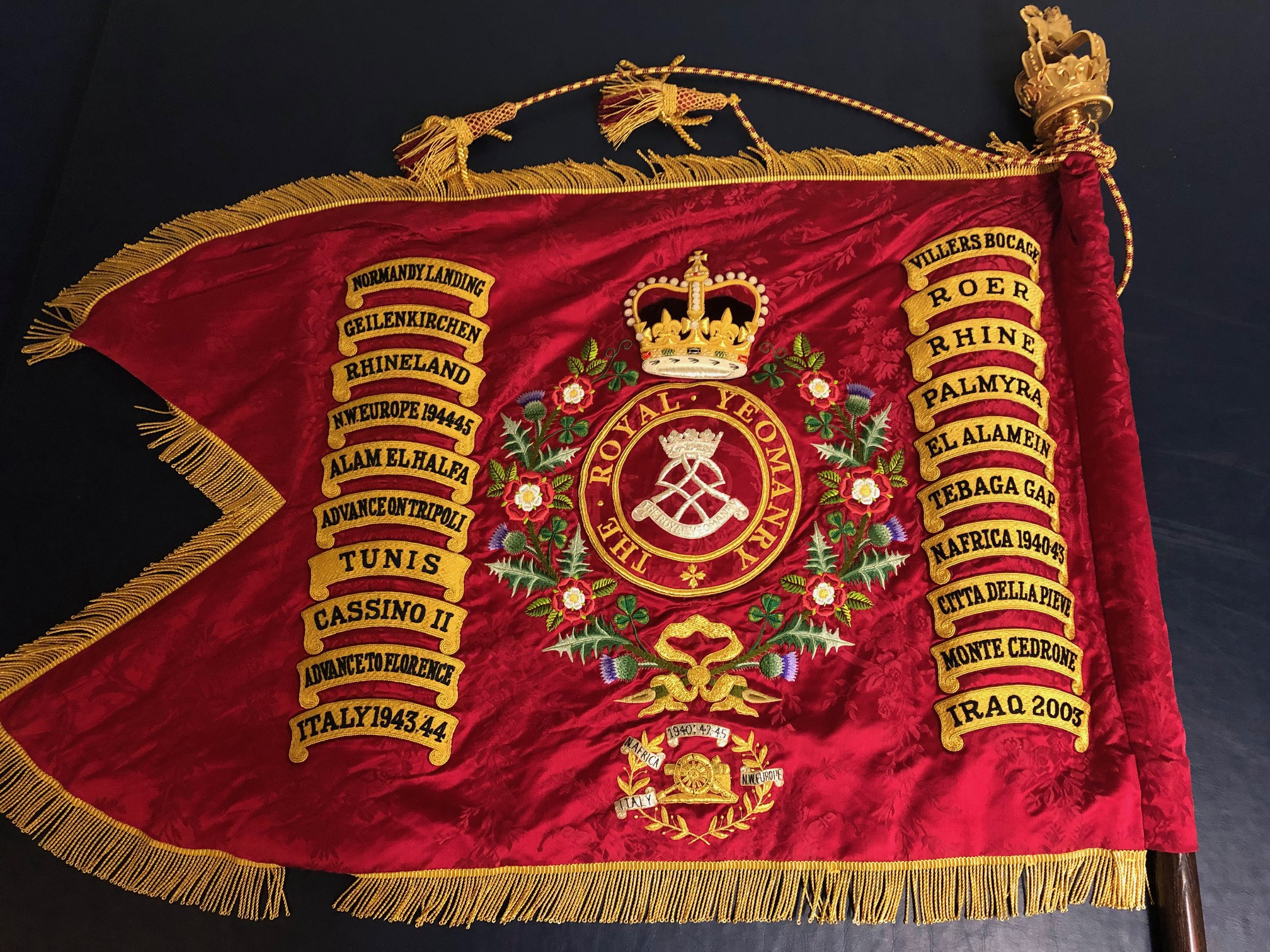
The Regimental guidon of the Royal Yeomanry (face)

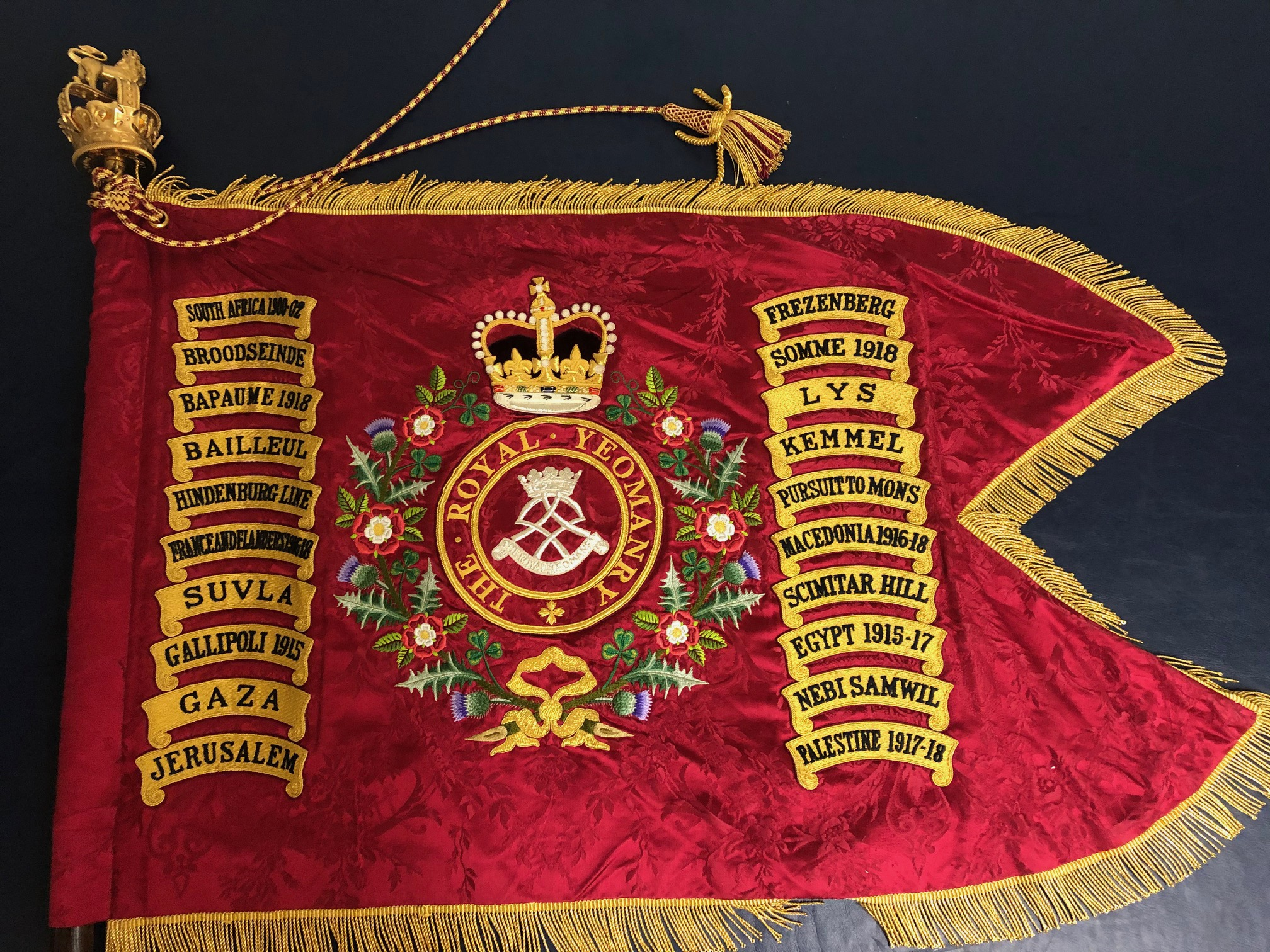
The Regimental guidon of the Royal Yeomanry (obverse)

As a result of the Regiment's initial service during the Iraq war, in 2005 the Royal Yeomanry was awarded the battle honour "Iraq 2003". This is the first such honour the regiment has won since its formation, and the first battle honour awarded to an Army Reserve regiment since the Second World War. The honour is carried on the regiment's guidon. The guidon, presented to the regiment on 7 May 2016, additionally bears 40 of the battle honours won by its antecedent regiments. As well as these, the guidon also carries an artillery badge as a distinction, and four theatre honours awarded to those of its antecedents that were converted to artillery during the Second World War.

Battle Honours:

Second Boer War	South Africa 1900–01
First World War	Gallipoli 1915, Scimitar Hill, Suvla, Frezenberg, Egypt 1915-17, Gaza, Nebi Samwil, Broodseinde, Jerusalem, France and Flanders 1916-18, Macedonia 1916-18, Palestine 1917–18, Bapaume 1918, Hindenburg Line, Pursuit to Mons, Somme 1918, Bailleul, Lys, Kemmel
Second World War	Palmyra, Alam el Halfa, El Alamein, Advance on Tripoli, Tunis, North Africa 1940-43, Normandy Landing, Città della Pieve, Cassino II, Monte Cedrone, Italy 1943, '44, Tebaga Gap, Geilenkirchen, Advance to Florence, Villers Bocage, NW Europe 1944-45, Rhine, Roer
Iraq War	Iraq 2003

== Lineage ==
1908 Haldane Reforms	1922 Amalgamations	1956 Defence White Paper	1966 Defence White Paper	1971 TA Reforms	1992 Options for Change	1998 Strategic Defence Review	2013 Army 2020	2021 Future Soldier
2nd County of London Yeomanry (Westminster Dragoons)		Berkshire and Westminster Dragoons, RAC	HQ Squadron, Royal Yeomanry		W Squadron, Royal Yeomanry		HQ (Command & Support) Squadron, Royal Yeomanry	F Squadron, Royal Yeomanry
Berkshire Yeomanry		Berkshire and Westminster Dragoons, RAC	HQ Squadron, Royal Yeomanry		W Squadron, Royal Yeomanry		HQ (Command & Support) Squadron, Royal Yeomanry	F Squadron, Royal Yeomanry
Sherwood Rangers Yeomanry			B Squadron, Royal Yeomanry		B Squadron, Queen's Own Yeomanry	S Squadron, Royal Yeomanry	A Squadron, Royal Yeomanry	
Staffordshire Yeomanry (Queen's Own Royal Regiment)				B Squadron, Queen's Own Mercian Yeomanry		A Squadron, Royal Mercian and Lancastrian Yeomanry	B Squadron, Royal Yeomanry	
Warwickshire Yeomanry		Queen's Own Warwickshire and Worcestershire Yeomanry		A Squadron, Queen's Own Mercian Yeomanry		A Squadron, Royal Mercian and Lancastrian Yeomanry	B Squadron, Royal Yeomanry	
Queen's Own Worcestershire Hussars		Queen's Own Warwickshire and Worcestershire Yeomanry		A Squadron, Queen's Own Mercian Yeomanry		A Squadron, Royal Mercian and Lancastrian Yeomanry	B Squadron, Royal Yeomanry	
Royal East Kent Yeomanry (Duke of Connaught's Own)	Kent Yeomanry	Kent and Sharpshooters Yeomanry	C Squadron, Royal Yeomanry					
Queen's Own West Kent Yeomanry	Kent Yeomanry	Kent and Sharpshooters Yeomanry	C Squadron, Royal Yeomanry					
3rd County of London Yeomanry (Sharpshooters) (Note: Merged with 4th County of London Yeomanry during World War II to form 3rd/4th County of London Yeomanry (Sharpshooters))		Kent and Sharpshooters Yeomanry	C Squadron, Royal Yeomanry					
Shropshire Yeomanry				C Squadron, Queen's Own Mercian Yeomanry		B Squadron, Royal Mercian and Lancastrian Yeomanry	D Squadron, Royal Yeomanry	
Leicestershire Yeomanry (Prince Albert's Own)		Leicestershire and Derbyshire Yeomanry		B Company, 3rd (V) Battalion, Worcestershire and Sherwood Foresters (Note: Converted to infantry in 1971, and split into two parts, attached to volunteer battalions of the Royal Anglian Regiment and the Worcestershire and Sherwood Foresters. The latter company then converted back to armour and became B Squadron of the Royal Yeomanry in 1992.)	B Squadron, Royal Yeomanry		E Squadron, Royal Yeomanry	E (HQ) Squadron, Royal Yeomanry
Derbyshire Yeomanry		Leicestershire and Derbyshire Yeomanry		B Company, 3rd (V) Battalion, Worcestershire and Sherwood Foresters	B Squadron, Royal Yeomanry		E Squadron, Royal Yeomanry	E (HQ) Squadron, Royal Yeomanry
City of London Yeomanry (Rough Riders)		Inns of Court and City Yeomanry (Note: Served as an armoured car regiment 1961–1967, then re-roled as infantry, but a cadre was retained in the Royal Armoured Corps and formed the band of the Royal Yeomanry)	Royal Yeomanry Band					
Inns of Court Regiment		Inns of Court and City Yeomanry	Royal Yeomanry Band					

== Commanding Officers ==
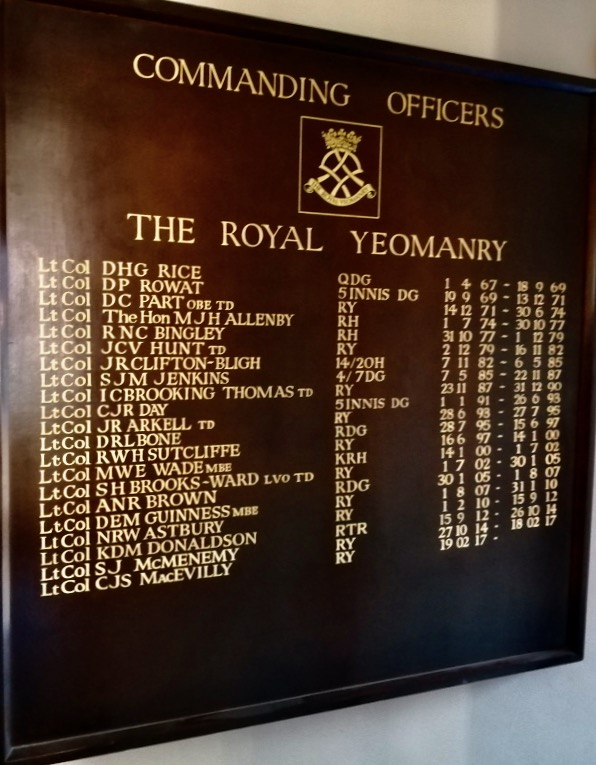
Honours board showing the Commanding Officers of the Royal Yeomanry, displayed at Regimental Headquarters Royal Yeomanry

Commanding officers have been as follows:

Lt Col	DHG Rice	QDG	1 Apr 1967 – 18 Sep 1969
Lt Col	DP Rowat	5 INNIS DG	19 Sep 1969 – 13 Dec 1971
Lt Col	DC Part OBE TD	RY	14 Dec 1971 – 30 Jun 1974
Lt Col	The Hon MJH Allenby	RH	1 Jul 1974 – 30 Oct 1977
Lt Col	RNC Bingley	RH	31 Oct 1977 – 1 Dec 1979
Lt Col	JCV Hunt OBE TD	RY	2 Dec 1979 – 16 Nov 1982
Lt Col	JR Clifton-Bligh	14/20H	7 Dec 1982 – 6 May 1985
Lt Col	SJM Jenkins	4/7DG	7 May 1985 – 22 Nov 1987
Lt Col	IC Brooking-Thomas TD	RY	23 Nov 1987 – 31 Dec 1990
Lt Col	CJR Day	5 INNIS DG	1 Jan 1991 – 26 Jun 1993
Lt Col	JR Arkell TD	RY	28 Jun 1993 – 27 Jul 1995
Lt Col	DRL Bone	RDG	28 Jul 1995 – 15 Jun 1997
Lt Col	RWH Sutcliffe	RY	16 Jun 1997 – 14 Jan 2000
Lt Col	MWE Wade MBE	KRH	15 Jan 2000 – 1 Jul 2002
Lt Col	SH Brooks-Ward LVO TD	RY	1 Jul 2002 – 30 Jan 2005
Lt Col	ANR Brown	RDG	30 Jan 2005 – 1 Aug 2007
Lt Col	DEM Guinness MBE	RY	1 Aug 2007 – 31 Jan 2010
Lt Col	NRW Astbury	RY	1 Feb 2010 – 15 Sep 2012
Lt Col	KDM Donaldson	RTR	15 Sep 2012 – 26 Oct 2014
Lt Col	SJ McMenemy	RY	27 Oct 2014 – 18 Feb 2017
Lt Col	CJS MacEvilly	RY	18 Feb 2017 – 27 Jul 2019
Lt Col	TWH Bragg	RY	28 Jul 2019 – 17 Jan 2022
Lt Col	CED Field KVRM	RY	17 Jan 2022 – 16 Jul 2024
Lt Col	M Bonner	RTR	17 Jul 2024 – present

== Order of precedence ==
For the purposes of parading, the Regiments of the British Army are listed according to an order of precedence. This is the order in which the various corps of the army parade, from right to left, with the unit at the extreme right being the most senior.

Preceded by Honourable Artillery Company	British Army; Order of Precedence	Succeeded by Royal Wessex Yeomanry

== See also ==
- Yeomanry

== Bibliography ==
- I.F.W. Beckett, Territorials - A Century of Service, Staplehurst, 3rd Edn 2003, ISBN 1-86227-167-4.
- P. Mileham, The Yeomanry Regiments, Plymouth, 2008, ISBN 978-0-9557813-1-5.
