= Queen's Own Warwickshire and Worcestershire Yeomanry =

- Active: 1956–present
- Country: United Kingdom
- Branch: British Army
- Type: Yeomanry
- Size: Regiment initially, now 2 squadrons
- Part of: Royal Armoured Corps
- Headquarters: Redditch & Dudley

Commanders
- Royal Honorary Colonel: Queen Elizabeth II

The Queen's Own Warwickshire and Worcestershire Yeomanry (QOWWY) was a regiment of the Royal Armoured Corps, forming part of the Territorial Army (TA). Following reductions in 1969 and 1971 respectively, the regiment was reduced to two and later one company sized sub-unit in 1999. Following a reorganisation in 2021, there are now two successors to the regiment: one squadron in the Royal Yeomanry (Royal Armoured Corps) as light cavalry, and one squadron in the 37th Signal Regiment (Royal Corps of Signals) as a support squadron.

== History ==
=== Formation ===
In 1956, the British Government announced its intention to reduce the size of the Territorial Army, due to its high running costs. One of the changes to be brought by this reorganisation was the merging of several yeomanry regiments into new larger regiments. Therefore, in November 1956, it was announced that the Warwickshire Yeomanry and the Queen's Own Worcestershire Hussars were to be amalgamated. In 1957, the regiment completed this transition and became known as the Queen's Own Warwickshire and Worcestershire Yeomanry.

The new regiment's structure on formation was as follows:

- Regimental Headquarters, in Warwick
- A Squadron, in Warwick
- B Squadron, in Birmingham
- C Squadron, in Kidderminster
- D Squadron, in Stratford-upon-Avon

Shortly after formation, Queen Elizabeth II agreed to be the Honorary Colonel of the regiment (inherited by the Queen's Worcestershire Hussars), thereby becoming the only regiment in the army to have that singular honour.

Until 1962, the regiment was equipped with Comet cruiser tanks under the 9th Armoured Brigade, but then converted to an armoured car regiment. In 1966, it converted to a light reconnaissance regiment equipped with Dingo scout cars.

=== Royal Armoured Corps ===
In 1967, the TA was again massively reduced as a result of the 1966 Defence White Paper. As a result of this reduction, the regiment was disbanded and concurrently reconstituted as an infantry unit in TAVR III (Home Defence) as the Queen's Own Warwickshire and Worcestershire Yeomanry (Territorials). The new regiment was now reduced to three squadrons, though significantly reduced in size.

After its reduction, the regiment's structure became:

- Regimental Headquarters, in Shirley (Note: Moving to Stratford-upon-Avon on 1 June 1968)
- A (Royal Warwickshire Fusiliers) Squadron, in Coventry (successor to 7th Battalion, Royal Warwickshire Regiment)
- B Squadron, in Stratford-upon-Avon (successor to former QOWWY)
- C Squadron, in Stourbridge (including elements of 267th (Worcestershire) Field Regiment, Royal Artillery)

In 1971, the TAVR saw yet another reorganisation, and on 1 April 1971 the armoured regiment was disbanded and concurrently reconstituted as a cadre. The cadre then formed A (Warwickshire and Worcestershire Yeomanry) Squadron in the new Mercian Yeomanry in Coventry with a troop in Stourbridge, including X Troop in Birmingham, from the Warwickshire Regiment, Royal Artillery.

Following the dissolution of the Soviet Union and consequent end of the Cold War, A Sqn was transferred to the newly formed Royal Mercian and Lancastrian Yeomanry, itself formed through the amalgamation of the Queen's Own Mercian Yeomanry and Duke of Lancaster's Own Yeomanry.

On 1 July 1999, as a result of another TA reorganisation, A Sqn was amalgamated with the Staffordshire Yeomanry to form A (Staffordshire, Warwickshire, and Worcestershire) Squadron in the Royal Mercian and Lancastrian Yeomanry at Dudley.

Following a reorganisation of the Royal Yeomanry in January 2021, B (Warwickshire and Worcestershire Yeomanry) Squadron was reformed as a light cavalry squadron armed with Land Rovers. The previous B Sqn of the RY 'B (Staffordshire, Warwickshire, and Worcestershire Yeomanry) Squadron has withdrawn from Staffordshire, leading to the name change. The squadron is based at Alamein House in Dudley, West Midlands.

=== Royal Corps of Signals ===
In 1969, the Territorial Army was again reduced, and subsumed by the new Territorial and Army Volunteer Reserve. That year, the regiment was reduced to a small cadre of five members, to be retained for possible expansion in later years. However, at the same time because of their links with the counties of Warwickshire and Worcestershire, the regiment was invited to form a new signal squadron in the TAVR IIB category. Therefore, shortly after 67 (Queen's Own Warwickshire and Worcestershire Yeomanry) Signal Squadron was formed in Stratford-upon-Avon with a troop in Stourbridge and placed under the newly formed 37 (Wessex and Welsh) Signal Regiment. The squadron was formed with many members of the former regiment, with an approximate strength of 100 men.

While the new squadron was formed, the old armoured regiment was converted to the Queen's Own Warwickshire and Worcestershire Yeomanry, in TAVR III (cadre units) sponsored by 37 (Wessex and Welsh) Signal Regiment.

In 2009, following the reorganisation of the Royal Corps of Signals, 67 (Queen's Own Warwickshire and Worcestershire Yeomanry) Signal Squadron was redesignated as 54 (Queen's Own Warwickshire and Worcestershire Yeomanry) Support Squadron. Today, the squadron is based in Redditch alongside RHQ, 37th Signal Regiment of the Royal Corps of Signals.

Under the Army 2020 Refine announced in 2015, the squadron formed 867 (Capability Development) Troop based in Redditch, this troop is tasked with using innovative tactics and working to change the face of the Royal Corps of Signals's reserve units and how they operate with new technology.

The squadron's current role is as follows:

... (The Squadron) provides enabling capability to the rest of the regiment. The Capability Development troop has received 2 Falcon WASPs and is conducting innovation projects that fits with the reserve signal regiments. The Squadron actively takes part in Exercise Flying Falcon with the Falcon capability.

— Royal Corps of Signals Interactive Map

== Alliances and Associations ==
The regiment maintained two associations with regular RAC regiments:

- 1958–1993; The Queen's Own Hussars
- 1993–1999; The Queen's Royal Hussars (The Queen's Own and Royal Irish)

The regiment's sole alliance was the Australian 10th Light Horse Regiment.

== Uniform ==
The regiment's uniform consisted of a scarlet tunic, blue trimming, and white facings.

67 Signal Squadron is authorised to wear some embellishments of the former QOWWY. These include SD hat; 13th/18th Royal Hussars' pattern, white top, and black bottom on which is worn the Royal Corps of Signals cap badge, Warwickshire Yeomanry collar badges with a Bear and Ragged Staff. WWY brass titles, WWY embroidered in yellow on a khaki epaulette, white lanyard, Silver Pear Blossom arm badge for Senior NCO's and Warrant Officers (this insignia had been the cap badge of the Queen's Own Worcestershire Hussars), and a stable belt of QOWH which is blue, red, and green in equal widths. No.1 Dress consists of Blues: Cavalry Pattern (navy blue) with two white stripes on outer leg. No.1 Dress Mess Kit: Royal Signals' red jacket with QOWWY collar badges. A black waistcoat. Buttons are QOWWY pattern depicting the Warwick and a Ragged Staff. A navy blue patrol jacket with white frogging, and a busby are worn with full ceremonial dress.

A Fern Leaf badge, a distinction from 2nd New Zealand Expeditionary Force 1943 in recognition of service in 9th Armoured Brigade with 2nd New Zealand Division, is worn on ties and as a lapel badge for civilian dress.

== Honorary Colonels ==
[Royal] Honorary Colonel

- 31 October 1956 – 1 April 1967: Queen Elizabeth II

Honorary Colonels

- 1956—10 June 1963: Air Commodore John Henry Peyton Verney, 20th Baron Willoughby de Broke
- 10 June 1963 – 9 August 1975: Colonel Charles John Lyttelton, 10th Viscount Cobham
- 9 August 1975 – 1 February 1983: Colonel R. D. N. Fabricius
- 1 February 1983 – 1 November 1992: Colonel A. Fender
- 1 November 1992 – 1 July 1999: Major Sir A. W. Wiggin

== Footnotes ==
Notes

Citations
