= Royal Mercian and Lancastrian Yeomanry =

The Royal Mercian and Lancastrian Yeomanry
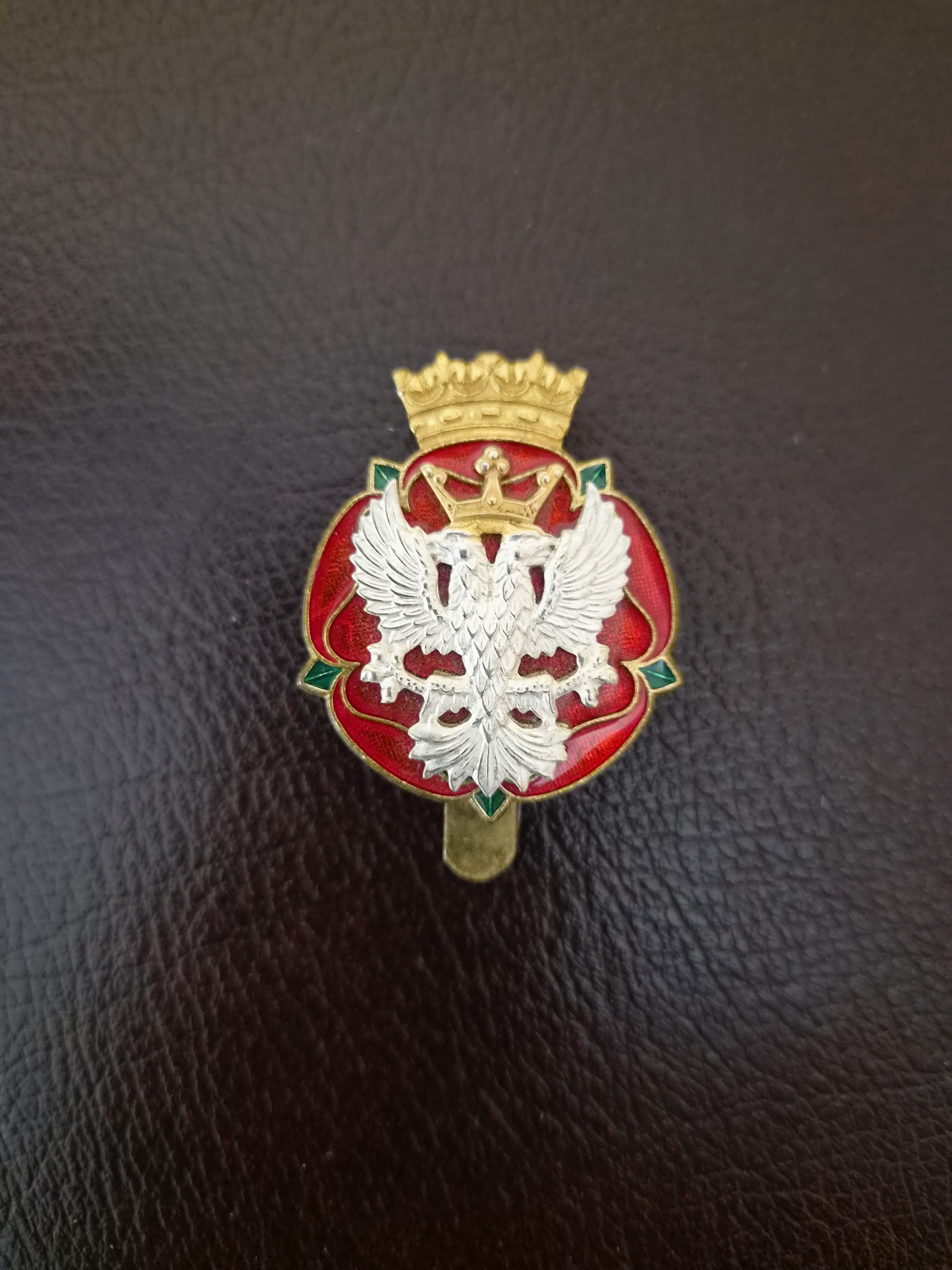
- Cap badge of the Royal Mercian and Lancastrian Yeomanry
- Active: November 1992-April 2014
- Allegiance: United Kingdom
- Branch: British Army
- Type: Yeomanry
- Role: Armour Replacement
- Size: One regiment
- Part of: Royal Armoured Corps
- Garrison/HQ: RHQ - Telford; A Squadron - Dudley; B Squadron - Telford; C Squadron - Chester; D Squadron - Wigan; H-Detachment - Hereford

Commanders
- Colonel-in-Chief: Queen Elizabeth II
- Honorary Colonel: Major General The Duke of Westminster KG OBE TD DL

Insignia
- Tactical Recognition Flash

The Royal Mercian and Lancastrian Yeomanry was a yeomanry regiment of the United Kingdom's Territorial Army. It served in the armoured replacement role, providing replacement tank crews for regular armoured regiments.

== History ==
The regiment was formed in November 1992 by the amalgamation of The Queen's Own Mercian Yeomanry and The Duke of Lancaster's Own Yeomanry as part of the Options for Change. In 1999, it absorbed a squadron from The Queen's Own Yeomanry, bringing it to a strength of four squadrons plus the headquarters squadron.

In October 2006, the RMLY became a single cap badge regiment, when the individual cap badges of each squadron were replaced by the newly designed RMLY cap badge. This incorporated the Mercian Eagle from the Queen's Own Mercian Yeomanry with the Red Rose from the Duke of Lancaster's Own Yeomanry. This was also the point at which H-Det joined the regiment, to provide a Recce troop. H-Detachment was renamed Manoeuvre and Support Squadron in 2011, when it was given Squadron status; it still consisted of the Recce troop, but now also housed the "hoop" (communications for the squadron).

In July 2013, it was announced that the RMLY would be restructured under the Army 2020 plan. A and B Squadrons were resubordinated to The Royal Yeomanry, while C and D Squadrons were resubordinated to The Queen's Own Yeomanry. The regiment was disbanded in April 2014.

== Organisation ==
The RMLY consisted of a Recce Troop, a Command Troop (within the detachment based in Hereford) and four sabre squadrons. Each sabre squadrons perpetuates a historic Yeomanry regiment, which is reflected in their subtitles:

- A (Staffordshire, Warwickshire and Worcestershire Yeomanry) Squadron
- B (Shropshire Yeomanry) Squadron
- C (Cheshire Yeomanry) Squadron
- D (Duke of Lancaster's Own Yeomanry) Squadron
- Manoeuvre and Support Squadron (Hereford) - The Herefordshire (Light Infantry) Squadron

== Lineage ==
Lineage to 1992
The Royal Mercian and Lancastrian Yeomanry (1992)	The Mercian Yeomanry (1971) renamed The Queen's Own Mercian Yeomanry (1973)	The Queen's Own Warwickshire and Worcestershire Yeomanry (1956)	The Warwickshire Yeomanry (1794)
The Royal Mercian and Lancastrian Yeomanry (1992)	The Mercian Yeomanry (1971) renamed The Queen's Own Mercian Yeomanry (1973)	The Queen's Own Warwickshire and Worcestershire Yeomanry (1956)	The Queen's Own Worcestershire Hussars (1831)
The Royal Mercian and Lancastrian Yeomanry (1992)	The Mercian Yeomanry (1971) renamed The Queen's Own Mercian Yeomanry (1973)	The Staffordshire Yeomanry (Queen's Own Royal Regiment) (1794)	
The Royal Mercian and Lancastrian Yeomanry (1992)	The Mercian Yeomanry (1971) renamed The Queen's Own Mercian Yeomanry (1973)	The Shropshire Yeomanry (1872)	North Salopian Yeomanry (1795) South Salopian Yeomanry (1795)
The Royal Mercian and Lancastrian Yeomanry (1992)	The Duke of Lancaster's Own Yeomanry (Royal Tank Regiment) (1967) renamed The Duke of Lancaster's Own Yeomanry (1971)	The Duke of Lancaster's Own Yeomanry (1797)	
The Royal Mercian and Lancastrian Yeomanry (1992)	The Duke of Lancaster's Own Yeomanry (Royal Tank Regiment) (1967) renamed The Duke of Lancaster's Own Yeomanry (1971)	The 40th/41st Royal Tank Regiment (1956)	15th Lancashire Rifle Volunteer Corps (1860) 4th Volunteer Battalion, The King's (Liverpool Regiment) (1888); 7th Battalion, The King's (Liverpool Regiment) (1908); 40th (The King's) Royal Tank Regiment (1938)
The Royal Mercian and Lancastrian Yeomanry (1992)	The Duke of Lancaster's Own Yeomanry (Royal Tank Regiment) (1967) renamed The Duke of Lancaster's Own Yeomanry (1971)	The 40th/41st Royal Tank Regiment (1956)	22nd Lancashire Rifle Volunteer Corps (1882); 6th Volunteer Battalion, The Manchester Regiment (1888); 10th Battalion, The Manchester Regiment (1908); 41st (Oldham) Royal Tank Regiment (1938)

== Order of precedence ==
For the purposes of parading, the Regiments of the British Army are listed according to an order of precedence. This is the order in which the various corps of the army parade, from right to left, with the unit at the extreme right being the most senior.

Preceded by Royal Wessex Yeomanry	British Army; Order of Precedence	Succeeded by Queen's Own Yeomanry
