= Leicestershire and Derbyshire Yeomanry =

The Leicestershire & Derbyshire (Prince Albert's Own) Yeomanry
- Cap badge of the Leicestershire and Derbyshire Yeomanry
- Active: February 1957 – present
- Country: United Kingdom
- Branch: Army Reserve
- Type: Yeomanry
- Role: Light Cavalry
- Size: 1 Squadron
- Part of: Royal Armoured Corps
- Garrison/HQ: E (LDY) Squadron, The Royal Yeomanry – Glen Parva Barracks, Tigers Road, South Wigston, Leicester, LE18 4WS.
- Nickname: The LDY or Albert's Lads
- March: Yeomanry by Bandmaster R Stent
- Anniversaries: 13 May (Frezenberg)

Commanders
- Current commander: Major Paul Sparrow
- Honorary Colonel: Lieutenant Colonel Anthony C. Richards, CVO

Insignia
- Stable belt

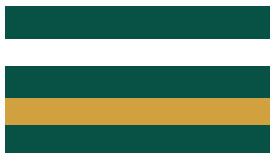
- Tactical Recognition Flash

The Leicestershire and Derbyshire (Prince Albert's Own) Yeomanry was formed in 1957 as a regiment of the British Army. It evolved to become part of the Royal Yeomanry. Its lineage is maintained by the E (Leicestershire and Derbyshire Yeomanry) Squadron of that regiment.

== History ==
The regiment was formed by the amalgamation of the Leicestershire Yeomanry and the Derbyshire Yeomanry in 1957. The regiment was re-roled as infantry in 1967, with four squadrons. In 1969 it was reduced to a cadre. The cadre paraded its Guidon at Catterick Garrison later that year and was expanded to squadron strength as the Leicestershire and Derbyshire (Prince Albert's Own) Yeomanry Squadron, 7th Battalion, the Royal Anglian Regiment in 1971.

B (Leicestershire and Derbyshire Yeomanry) Squadron, The Royal Yeomanry in 1993

The squadron was re-designated a company in 1975 and the company was split into two parts in 1978:

- The Leicestershire and Derbyshire (Prince Albert's Own) Yeomanry Company, 7th (Volunteer) Battalion, The Royal Anglian Regiment
- B (Leicestershire and Derbyshire Yeomanry) Company, 3rd (Volunteer) Battalion, The Worcestershire and Sherwood Foresters Regiment

Theses units were re-designated respectively in 1992:

- 3 (Leicestershire and Derbyshire Yeomanry) Company, 5th Battalion, The Royal Anglian Regiment
- B (Leicestershire and Derbyshire Yeomanry) Squadron, The Royal Yeomanry

The Royal Anglian company converted to become 158th (Royal Anglian) Transport Regiment of the Royal Logistic Corps in 1996, and ceased to maintain its yeomanry lineage.

Meanwhile, B (Leicestershire and Derbyshire Yeomanry) Squadron, The Royal Yeomanry was re-designated E (Leicestershire and Derbyshire Yeomanry) Squadron, The Royal Yeomanry in June 2015. It now uses the British Army Jackal mounted with heavy machine gun and Heckler & Koch GMG and operates in a light armoured reconnaissance role.
