= Duke of Lancaster's Own Yeomanry =

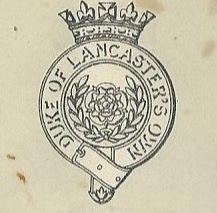
- Cap badge
- Active: 1798–present
- Country: Kingdom of Great Britain (1798–1800); United Kingdom (1801–present)
- Branch: British Army
- Type: Yeomanry
- Size: 1–3 Regiments; Squadron (current)
- Part of: Royal Armoured Corps
- Engagements: Second Boer War; First World War France and Flanders 1915–18 Second World War Italy 1943–45 North-West Europe 1944–45
- Battle honours: See battle honours below

Commanders
- Honorary Colonel: Lt Col Mike Glover, TD

The Duke of Lancaster's Own Yeomanry (DLOY) was a yeomanry unit of the British Army from 1798 to 1992. Originally raised as part-time cavalry for home defence and internal security, the regiment sent mounted infantry to serve in the Second Boer War. During World War I it carried out mounted duties in Egypt and Palestine and on the Western Front. By 1917 the reserve units at home had become cyclists and the regiment serving on the Western Front joined an infantry battalion, seeing action at the Battle of Passchendaele, against the German Spring Offensive and in the final Allied Hundred Days Offensive. At the beginning of World War II the regiment gave up its horses and formed two regiments of medium artillery, which served in the Middle East, Italy and North West Europe. Postwar it became an armoured unit. Today its lineage is maintained by B (Duke of Lancaster's Own Yeomanry) Squadron, the Queen's Own Yeomanry.

== French Revolutionary and Napoleonic Wars ==
After Britain was drawn into the French Revolutionary Wars, Prime Minister William Pitt the Younger proposed in 1794 that the counties should form a force of Volunteer Yeoman Cavalry (Yeomanry) that could be called on by the King to defend the country against invasion or by the Lord Lieutenant to subdue any civil disorder within the county. A number of counties did so immediately, mainly those close to the threatened coastline. By 1797–98 the threat of invasion seemed more acute, and the government encouraged the formation of local armed associations of cavalry and infantry for purely local defence. The County of Lancaster (Lancashire) raised the following independent Troops:

- Liverpool Light Horse, one troop raised 23 March 1797
- Manchester & Salford Light Horse, three troops raised 11 May 1797; expanded 1798 to six troops
- Bolton Light Horse Volunteers, two troops raised 5 April 1798
- Ashton-in-Makerfield Association, one troop raised 2 May 1798
- Manchester Light Horse, one troop raised May 1798
- Loyal Blackburn Association, one troop raised 6 June 1798
- Oldham Association, one troop raised 27 June 1798
- Atherton Association, one troop raised 2 July 1798

Most volunteer cavalry was disbanded after the Treaty of Amiens in 1802, but the peace was short-lived, and many troops were reformed or newly formed:

- Liverpool Light Horse, one troop reformed 3 August 1802, second troop formed 1803; disbanded ca 1828
- Bolton le Moors Cavalry (also known as Bolton Volunteer Cavalry), one troop reformed 3 August 1802; disbanded 1813, reformed 6 January 1820 as Bolton Yeomanry Cavalry
- Loyal Ashton Yeomanry Cavalry, one troop reformed 3 August 1802; disbanded 28 May 1823; reformed 31 August 1848 as Lancashire Hussars Yeomanry Cavalry
- Manchester & Salford Light Horse, three troops reformed 17 August 1802, reduced to two troops 1806; disbanded ca 1814; reformed 1817 as Manchester and Salford Yeomanry
- Preston Yeomanry Cavalry, one troop raised 9 August 1803; disbanded ca 1806
- Oldham Yeomanry Cavalry, reformed 1817; disbanded ca 1824
- Furness Cuirassiers (also known as Furness Yeomanry cavalry), one troop raised 23 August 1819
- Wigan Volunteer Light Horse, one troop raised 20 October 1819

== 19th Century ==
The Yeomanry declined in importance and strength after the Battle of Waterloo, but in the absence of police it remained available for use in aid of the civil power, particularly in the industrial North of England. The Manchester & Salford Light Horse was reformed as the Manchester and Salford Yeomanry with two troops in 1817. It participated in the so-called Peterloo Massacre in 1819, when 11 unarmed civilians were killed and around 400 injured by the action of the Regular and Yeomanry cavalry who had been called out to control a demonstration at St Peter's Fields, Manchester.

In 1827 the government withdrew funding for the yeomanry when called out on duty, but units were permitted to continue unpaid. The remaining Lancashire troops (Bolton, Furness and Wigan) were regimented on 18 August 1828 as the Lancashire Corps of Yeomanry Cavalry. King William IV granted the title Duke of Lancaster's Corps of Yeomanry Cavalry in 1834. Since then the Sovereign, as the Duke of Lancaster, has traditionally served as Colonel-in-Chief of the DLOY. (Note: However, the DLOY title may have been used unofficially as early as 1819.)

Yeomanry pay for duty was restored in 1831 with the increasing social unrest in the country, but by 1839 the strength of the Yeomanry in Lancashire was only 171, despite the county having a large and restless urban population. The DLOY raised additional troops at Rochdale (1844) and Worsley (1845), and the regimental headquarters (RHQ) moved to Worsley. The former Loyal Ashton Yeomanry Cavalry was revived on 31 August 1848 as the Lancashire Hussars Yeomanry Cavalry, giving the southwestern part of the county its own regiment.

An invasion scare in 1859 led to the emergence of the Volunteer Movement, and Rifle Volunteer Corps (RVCs) began to be organised throughout Great Britain, Lancashire raising a large number. Units of Mounted Rifle Volunteers, later termed Light Horse Volunteers (LHVs), were also raised among farming and foxhunting communities, to carry out reconnaissance for the RVCs. The LHVs were less expensively dressed and less socially exclusive than the Yeomanry, but they occupied an anomalous position between them and the Rifle Volunteers, and most were short-lived. Two such units were raised in Lancashire:

- 1st Lancashire Mounted Rifle Volunteer Corps, raised 22 March 1860 at Manchester, redesignated February 1861 as the 1st Lancashire Light Horse Volunteer Corps, disbanded in 1872
- 2nd Lancashire Light Horse Volunteer Corps, raised 11 July 1861 at Liverpool, disbanded in 1871

The Lieutenant-Colonel Commandant of the DLOY from 15 December 1862 was the Hon Algernon Egerton, who was also Lt-Col Commandant of the 3rd Manchester Rifles. He retained the command until 20 March 1882, when he was succeeded by his long-time second-in-command, Arthur Egerton, 3rd Earl of Wilton. The earl died in 1884 and was succeeded by Lt-Col R.H. Ainsworth on 29 October. The Hon Algernon Egerton was appointed the regiment's Honorary Colonel on 6 June 1885.

In 1872 the Furness Trp was disbanded and replaced by a new troop at Oldham. Further troops were raised at Broughton, Salford, in 1877 and at Blackburn in 1880, but the Wigan Trp was disbanded in 1883. Two more troops were formed at Blackpool and Liverpool in 1889. Then on 1 April 1893 the Yeomanry adopted the squadron organisation, with the DLOY organised as follows:

- RHQ at Worsley
- A Squadron:Oldham and Rochdale Trps
- B Squadron: Liverpool and Bolton Trps
- C Squadron: Broughton and Worsley Trps
- D Squadron: Blackburn and Blackpool Trps

In the late 19th Century the DLOY was ranked 12 in order of precedence among yeomanry regiments, apparently based on the date of first raising the Bolton Troop.

Following the Cardwell Reforms a mobilisation scheme began to appear in the Army List from December 1875. This assigned Regular, Militia and Yeomanry units places in an order of battle of corps, divisions and brigades for the 'Active Army', even though these formations were entirely theoretical, with no staff or services assigned. The DLOY was assigned as 'divisional troops' to 3rd Division of VI Corps based at Manchester. This was never more than a paper organisation, but from April 1893 the Army List showed the Yeomanry regiments grouped into brigades for collective training. They were commanded by the senior regimental commanding officer but they did have a Regular Brigade major. The Duke of Lancaster's together with the Westmorland and Cumberland Yeomanry formed the 14th Yeomanry Brigade. The Yeomanry brigades disappeared from the Army List after the Second Boer War.

== Imperial Yeomanry ==
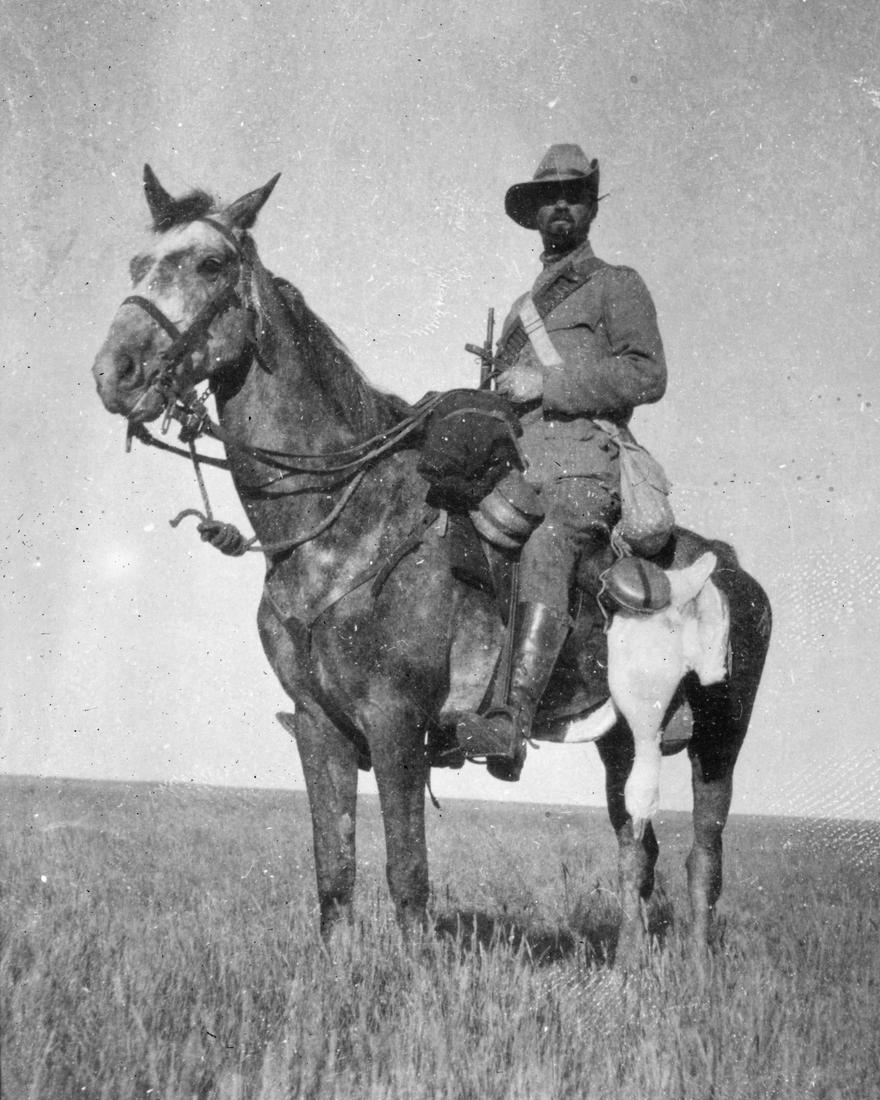
A typical Imperial Yeoman on campaign

Following a string of defeats during Black Week in early December 1899, the British government realised that it would need more troops than just the Regulars to fight the Second Boer War. On 13 December, the decision to allow volunteer forces to serve in South Africa was made, and a Royal Warrant was issued on 24 December. This officially created the Imperial Yeomanry (IY). The force was organised as county service companies of approximately 115 men signed up for one year. Volunteers from the Yeomanry and civilians quickly filled the new force, which was equipped to operate as Mounted infantry, armed with a Lee–Metford infantry rifle and bayonet instead of a cavalry carbine and sabre.

The Duke of Lancaster's Yeomanry and Lancashire Hussars co-sponsored the 24th and 32nd (Lancashire) Companies, which served in the 8th and 2nd IY Battalions respectively.

2nd Battalion, IY, including 32nd (Lancashire) Company, landed in South Africa on 28 February 1900 and was sent to Naauwpoort as part of a Yeomanry brigade under Major-General John Brabazon. 8th Battalion, IY, including 23rd (Lancashire) Company, landed in South Africa on 5 March 1900 From early May 1900 23rd (Lancashire) and 24th (Westmorland & Cumberland) Companies of the 8th Bn and 19th (Paget's Horse) Bn were serving under the Earl of Erroll with Sir Charles Warren's Column operating in Griqualand West. Warren began his advance before all the troops had assembled, and entered Douglas on 21 May. The Boers were at Campbell, blocking the route up onto the Kaap Plateau. On 26 May the column camped at Faber's Put, a farmstead a few miles south of Campbell. 23rd and 24th Companies and a small detachment of Paget's Horse were in camp. Warren had placed insufficient pickets and before dawn on 30 May a force of Boers surrounded the camp, infiltrated into the garden and prepared to attack. Spotted by a Yeomanry sentry who fired on them, the Boers fired back and a furious firefight ensued, while the Boers stampeded the Yeomanry's horses and shooting down gun crews. The two IY companies advanced to support their picket on the southern ridge and brought their two Colt machine guns into action. Leaving a party to keep down enfilading fire from the garden, and the Paget's Horse detachment to protect the machine guns, the rest of the IY advanced by rushes over open ground towards the ridge. Themselves under enfilade fire from the picket in the rocks, the Boers retired from the ridge before the Yeomanry arrived with their bayonets. The rest of the Boers in the garden ran back to their horses and rode off before the Yeomanry could recover their own horses. After the action at Faber's Put Warren was able to clear Griqualand West without further trouble.

The First Contingent of the Imperial Yeomanry completed their year's term of service and went home in May 1901, to be replaced by a Second Contingent who served until the end of the war in 1902. Most of the Second Contingent were raw recruits, but the 'Relieving Draft' for the 23rd Co did at least contain a number of DLOY men. These companies earned the DLOY its first Battle honour: South Africa 1900–02.

The Imperial Yeomanry were trained and equipped as mounted infantry. The concept was considered a success and before the war ended the existing Yeomanry regiments at home (including the DLOY) were converted into Imperial Yeomanry, with an establishment of RHQ and four squadrons with a machine gun section. RHQ of the Duke of Lancaster's Own Imperial Yeomanry moved from Worsley to Lancaster House, Whalley Road, Whalley Range, Manchester.

== Territorial Force ==
When the Imperial Yeomanry were subsumed into the new Territorial Force (TF) in the 1908 Haldane Reforms (under the Territorial and Reserve Forces Act 1907 (7 Edw. 7, c.9), the Duke of Lancaster's Own Yeomanry transferred to the new force. It was now distributed as follows:

- RHQ at Lancaster House, Whalley Range, Manchester
- A Squadron at Rifle Street, Oldham
  - Detachment at 27 Baron Street, Rochdale
- B Squadron at Bolton
  - Detachment at Liverpool
- C Squadron at Whalley Range
- D Squadron at Preston
  - Detachment at Blackpool

The Duke of Lancaster's, together with the Lancashire Hussars and the Westmorland & Cumberland Yeomanry, was attached to the TF's Welsh Border Mounted Brigade for peacetime training, but would be assigned to other formations in the event of war.

== World War I ==
=== Mobilisation ===
Under the 1907 Act, the TF was intended to be a home defence force for service during wartime and members could not be compelled to serve outside the country. However, on the outbreak of war on 4 August 1914, many members volunteered for Overseas Service. Therefore, TF units were split in August and September 1914 into 1st Line (liable for overseas service) and 2nd Line (home service for those unable or unwilling to serve overseas) units. Later, a 3rd Line was formed to act as a reserve, providing trained replacements for the 1st and 2nd Line regiments.

=== 1/1st Duke of Lancaster's Own Yeomanry ===
Formed in August 1914, in Manchester, the regiment became part of the Welsh Border Mounted Brigade. It was then split up with RHQ and 'C' Squadron joining the 23rd Division in April 1915, after being briefly attached to the 1st Cavalry Division in late April to early May 1916. 'A' Squadron joined the East Lancashire Division; then it moved to the 53rd Division while in Egypt on 29 January 1917, and moved to XXI Corps Cavalry Regiment in Palestine in August 1917, serving with it until the end of the war. 'D' Squadron joined the 14th (Light) Division.

On 14 May 1916, all of the 1/1st DLOY's subunits except 'A' Squadron reformed in France, where together with 'C' Squadron of the Surrey Yeomanry, they formed III Corps Cavalry Regiment.

However, unlike in Palestine, there was little requirement for mounted troops on the Western Front, and in the summer of 1917 a number of corps cavalry regiments were dismounted and the Yeomanry drafted to infantry battalions of their county regiments. On 31 July, after sending away specialists such as machine gunners, saddlers and medical personnel to their respective depots, the remainder of III Corps' regiment was sent to the Base Depot at Étaples for infantry training. The commanding officer commented:

'It is to be hoped that the drafting of this regiment & other corps cavalry regiments to infantry will benefit the service, though how this can be so when it is known that thousands of officers & men are still being trained in England for cavalry, it is almost impossible to imagine'.

=== 12th (DLOY) Battalion, Manchester Regiment ===
On 24 September 1917, 1/1st DLOY (7 officers and 125 ORs) joined 12th (Service) Bn, Manchester Regiment, which was redesignated 12th (Duke of Lancaster's Own Yeomanry) Bn. 12th (Service) Bn was originally raised as a Kitchener battalion on 7 October 1914 at Ashton-under-Lyne and had already seen considerable action with 52nd Brigade of 17th (Northern) Division, in the Ypres Salient in 1915–16, on the Somme in 1916, including the Battle of Delville Wood, and in the Arras Offensive earlier in 1917. Under its new designation, the battalion now took part in the final stages of the Third Ypres Offensive, the First and Second Battles of Passchendaele. After the dreadful experience of Passchendaele, 12th (DLOY) Battalion spent much of the winter training and in reserve.

When the German Spring Offensive was launched on 21 March 1918, 17th (N) Division was in holding positions in the vulnerable Flesquières Salient. On 22 March the Germans launched a series of attacks against the village of Havrincourt, held by 12th (DLOY) Bn, but all were halted. However, breakthroughs to the north and south rendered the position at Flesquières untenable, and 17th (N) Division was involved in a fighting retreat back to the River Ancre, where a defence line was established. During the Allied Hundred Days Offensive 17th (N) Division came into action during the Second Battle of the Somme, capturing Martinpuich on 25 August after 12th (DLOY) Bn encircled it from the south. Next day it was held up in front of High Wood until 12th (DLOY) Bn initiated another outflanking move. Another attempt by the battalion at an outflanking move, against Le Transloy on 1 September, was stopped by machine gun fire, but the village was heavily shelled overnight and 12th (DLOY) Bn, attacking at dawn, worked round the flank once more, forcing the Germans to evacuate.

The advance continued, with Third Army closing up to the Germans' Hindenburg Line defences. 52nd Brigade captured Chapel Hill during the attack on the Hindenburg outposts (the Battle of Épehy) on 18 September. The division advanced again on 9 October during the Second Battle of Cambrai, then 12th (DLOY) Bn had a hard fight at Neuvilly on the River Selle on 12 October, after which it had only four officers (including the CO, adjutant and medical officer) and a little over 300 men fit to fight. After being reinforced with a mixture of old soldiers and raw recruits, 12th (DLOY) Bn advanced again on 31 October, fording the river and pushing onto the ridge beyond against German shelling and rearguards. During the Battle of the Sambre on 4 November the battalion reached its objectives, despite casualties (many from Mustard gas). 52nd Brigade led the pursuit from 8 November, but could not catch up with the enemy before hostilities ended with the Armistice with Germany.

12th (DLOY) Battalion was disembodied on 20 May 1919.

=== 2/1st Duke of Lancaster's Own Yeomanry ===
The 2nd Line regiment was formed in September 1914. By July 1915, it was under the command of the 2/1st Western Mounted Brigade (along with the 2/1st Westmorland and Cumberland Yeomanry and the 2/1st Lancashire Hussars) and in March 1916 was at Cupar, Fife. On 31 March 1916, the remaining Mounted Brigades were numbered in a single sequence and the brigade became 21st Mounted Brigade, still at Cupar under Scottish Command.

In July 1916, there was a major reorganization of 2nd Line yeomanry units in the United Kingdom. All but 12 regiments were converted to cyclists and as a consequence the regiment was dismounted and the brigade converted to 14th Cyclist Brigade. Further reorganization in October and November 1916 saw the brigade redesignated as 10th Cyclist Brigade in October 1916, still at Cupar.

By January 1918, 10th Cyclist Brigade had moved to Lincolnshire with the regiment at Alford and Skegness. About May 1918 the brigade moved to Ireland and the regiment was stationed at Tralee, County Kerry. There were no further changes before the end of the war.

=== 3/1st Duke of Lancaster's Own Yeomanry ===
The 3rd Line regiment was formed in 1915 and in the summer it was affiliated to a Reserve Cavalry Regiment at The Curragh. In the summer of 1916 it was affiliated to 10th Reserve Cavalry Regiment, also at The Curragh. It was absorbed by the 6th Reserve Cavalry Regiment at Tidworth in early 1917.

== Interwar ==
Postwar, a commission was set up to consider the shape of the Territorial Force. The experience of the World War I made it clear that there was a surplus of cavalry. The commission decided that only the 14 most senior regiments were to be retained as cavalry, while the others would be converted to other roles with the Royal Artillery, the Royal Corps of Signals or the Royal Tank Corps. However, as the 12th most senior regiment in the order of precedence, the regiment was retained as horsed cavalry.

When the TF was reconstituted on 7 Feb 1920 the DLOY reformed with the following organisation:

- RHQ at Whalley Range, Manchester
- AC Sqn at Manchester
- B Sqn at Bolton and Rainhill
- D Sqn at Blackpool and Preston

The TF was reorganised as the Territorial Army (TA) in 1921, in which the regiment was designated as 'Army Troops' in 42nd (East Lancashire) Divisional Area.

== World War II ==
=== Mobilisation ===
The TA was embodied on 1 September 1939, just before the declaration of war, and the DLOY mobilised as a cavalry regiment in 42nd Divisional Area. While most of the remaining mounted Yeomanry regiments formed 1st Cavalry Division and left for service in Palestine in January 1940, the DLOY was left behind. On 15 January 1940 at Ramsbottom, Manchester, it transferred to the Royal Artillery (RA). It did not receive a regimental number until 15 April when (as most other TA units had already done) it split into two:

- 77th (Duke of Lancaster's Own Yeomanry) Medium Regiment, Royal Artillery at Manchester, with A and C Sqns forming A and B Medium Batteries
- 78th (Duke of Lancaster's Own Yeomanry) Medium Regiment, Royal Artillery at Haverfordwest, Wales, with B and D Sqns forming A and B Medium Btys

=== 77th (DLOY) Medium Regiment, RA ===
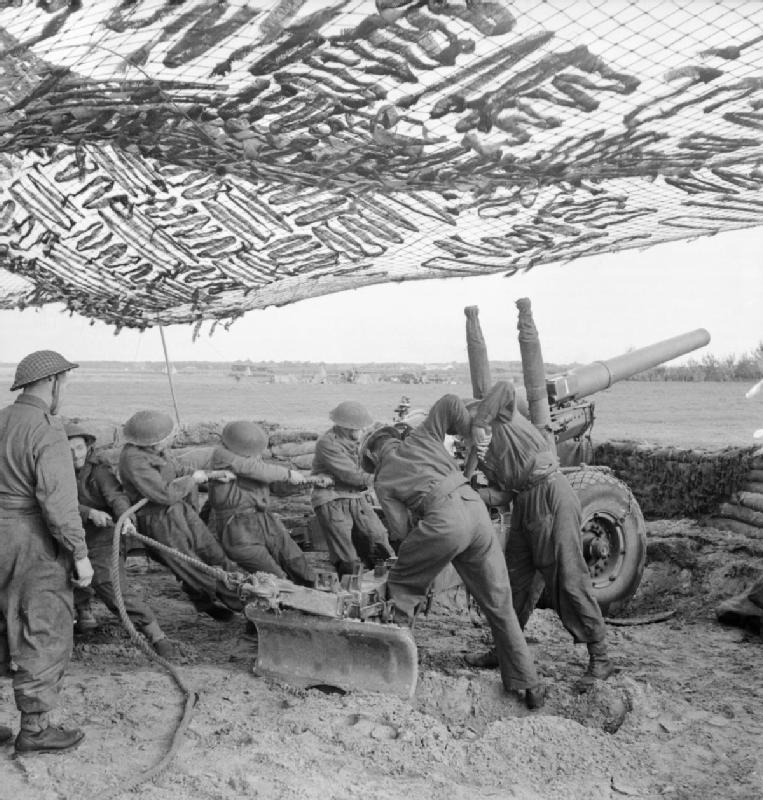
A 5.5-inch gun of 77th (DLOY) Medium Rgt being positioned to fire in support of 3rd Division advancing on Venray, 16 October 1944.

By the end of 1940 77th Medium Rgt was attached to 53rd (Welsh) Division in Northern Ireland and remained there for over two years. Its batteries were redesignated P and Q Btys on 11 March 1942, then 103 and 104 Btys on 1 January 1943.

When 21st Army Group was formed in early 1943 for the planned Allied invasion of Normandy (Operation Overlord), 77th (DLOY) Medium Rgt was assigned to 8th Army Group Royal Artillery. An Army Group Royal Artillery (AGRA) was a powerful artillery brigade, usually comprising three or four medium regiments and one heavy regiment.

8 AGRA's units landed in Normandy after D Day in June 1944 and supported VIII Corps in Operation Epsom (26–30 June) and Operation Jupiter (the recapture of Hill 112 on 10 July). It assisted II Canadian Corps in Operation Spring on 25 July and was then sent west with VIII Corps for Operation Bluecoat launched on 30 July, when 77th (DLOY) Med Rgt was in direct support of 11th Armoured Division. Within days the German front was cracked wide open.

VIII Corps was then 'grounded' to provide transport and fuel to Second Army's pursuit force and only played a minor role in Operation Market Garden (the Battle of Arnhem). Closing up to the River Maas took Second Army from October to the beginning of December. On 3 December 15th (Scottish) Division took the Germans' last bridgehead west of the Maas, at Blerick opposite Venlo, in Operation Guildford: 8 AGRA was one of three AGRAs supporting this attack by a single infantry brigade.

By March 1945 21st Army Group was in position to carry out an assault crossing of the Rhine (Operation Plunder). 8 AGRA again supported 15th (Scottish) Division, which crossed at 02.00 on 24 March, supported by massive firepower from the AGRAs (described by the divisional historian as 'earth-shaking'). After the Rhine crossing 21st Army Group began a rapid advance across northern Germany and there was little call for medium artillery. Increasingly, British units were called upon to act as occupation forces. After the German surrender at Lüneburg Heath this became the role for the whole of 21st Army Group while the troops awaited demobilisation. 77th (DLOY) Medium Rgt and its batteries began entering 'suspended animation' on 4 February 1946, completing the process by 25 February.

=== 78th (DLOY) Medium Regiment, RA ===
At the end of 1940 78th (DLOY) Medium Rgt and its signal section were still serving in Western Command, but by the end of March 1941 it was affiliated to 47th (London) Infantry Division in IV Corps on the invasion-threatened South Coast of England. IV Corps HQ was sent to Middle East Forces (MEF) at the beginning of 1942 and the regiment and 47th Division reverted to the direct control of Southern Command. A and B Batteries were redesignated P and Q on 11 March 1942, then 105 and 106 Medium Btys on 1 January 1943. The regiment had its own Light Aid Detachment of the Royal Electrical and Mechanical Engineers by August 1942.

During December 1942 78th (DLOY) Medium Rgt came under War Office control preparatory to going overseas, and it had left for MEF by February 1943. It served in Palestine and Syria then by January moved to join in the Italian Campaign as part of 6th Army Group Royal Artillery (6 AGRA).

After World War II the regiment was reorganised in the occupation forces on 21 October 1945 as 78th (Auxiliary Police) Regiment, Royal Artillery (Duke of Lancaster's own Yeomanry) with 105, 106, 700, 701 and 702 Btys. The regiment was placed in suspended animation on 14 April 1946.

== Postwar ==
When the TA was reconstituted on 1 January 1947, 78th (DLOY) Rgt was formally disbanded and the Duke of Lancaster's Own Yeomanry was reformed in the Royal Armoured Corps as the divisional armoured regiment of 42nd (Lancashire) Division.

The regiment's role changed to reconnaissance in 1956, when it was equipped with armoured cars, but on 1 April 1967, it combined with the 40th/41st Royal Tank Regiment as the Duke of Lancaster's Own Yeomanry, Royal Tank Regiment. Two years later, the combined regiment was reduced to a cadre until 1971, when it was reformed as an infantry unit. On 1 April 1983, it rejoined the Royal Armoured Corps as a home defence reconnaissance unit, being equipped with Land Rovers.

The regiment was disbanded as a result of the Options for Change on 1 November 1992 and its units amalgamated with those of The Queen's Own Mercian Yeomanry to form The Royal Mercian and Lancastrian Yeomanry. Following the disbanding of the Royal Mercian and Lancastrian Yeomanry in 2014, the regiment's lineage is maintained by B (Duke of Lancaster's Own Yeomanry) Squadron, the Queen's Own Yeomanry.

== Heritage & Ceremonial ==
=== Uniform & insignia ===
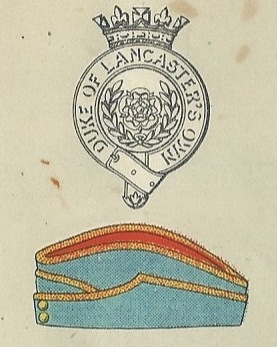
Cap badge and service cap of the DLOY, as worn at the outbreak of World War II.

By the late 19th Century the DLOY was dressed and equipped as Dragoons. The tunic was scarlet with the blue facings appropriate to a 'Royal' regiment and a white metal dragoon helmet of 1844 pattern was worn with a white plume. Unusually the officers' lace was gold, whereas most auxiliary units wore silver. The blue riding pantaloons carried yellow stripes. Other ranks wore a white shoulder belt over the left shoulder; in marching order a white leather bandolier was also slung over the right shoulder. Black sheepskin saddle covers were provided for troop horses from ca 1844 to 1896.

On conversion to Imperial Yeomanry, the DLOY adopted the khaki service dress for general use in 1902. However a simplified full dress was worn for ceremonial and off-duty wear from 1903 to the outbreak of war in 1914. For all ranks this comprised a scarlet patrol jacket with dark blue facings worn with drab riding breeches or, for dismounted duties dark blue overalls (tight cavalry trousers buttoned under the ankles) with yellow stripes. The 19th century dragoon helmets with white plumes were still worn for special occasions but only officers were required to obtain the pre-1903 full dress tunics and gold laced belts for attendance at court levees, as late as 1938.

The official badge granted to the regiment was 'The Red Rose of Lancaster'. In the white metal cap badge the rose appeared within a laurel wreath, surrounded by a Garter strap bearing the title 'DUKE OF LANCASTER'S OWN', surmounted by a royal ducal coronet. When the DLOY converted to the Royal Artillery both successor regiments were permitted to retain its cap badge. In the version worn during World War II the Garter strap was left off, and the regimental title appeared on a scroll intertwined through the wreath. 77th and 78th Medium Regiments also wore Lancashire Rose Yeomanry collar badges in white metal (apparently the same as the Lancashire Hussars, which had converted to artillery in 1921). They also wore an embroidered shoulder title lettered 'DLO YEOMANRY'.

=== Battle honours ===
The Duke of Lancaster's Own Yeomanry was awarded the following battle honours (honours in bold are emblazoned on the guidon):

Second Boer War	**South Africa 1900–02**	Honorary Distinction from the Second World War, awarded to the Shropshire Yeomanry for service as a Royal Artillery regiment. The Duke of Lancaster's Own Yeomanry Honorary Distinction was similar.
First World War	**Somme 1916** **'18**, **Albert 1916** **'18**, **Ypres 1917**, **Passchendaele**, **St. Quentin**, Bapaume 1918, **Amiens**, **Hindenburg Line**, Épehy, **Cambrai 1918**, Selle, **Sambre**, **France and Flanders 1915–18**	Honorary Distinction from the Second World War, awarded to the Shropshire Yeomanry for service as a Royal Artillery regiment. The Duke of Lancaster's Own Yeomanry Honorary Distinction was similar.
Second World War	The Royal Artillery was present in nearly all battles and would have earned most of the honours awarded to cavalry and infantry regiments. In 1833, William IV awarded the motto Ubique (meaning "everywhere") in place of all battle honours. Honorary Distinction: Badge of the Royal Regiment of Artillery with year-dates "1944–45" and two scrolls: "North-West Europe" and "Italy"	Honorary Distinction from the Second World War, awarded to the Shropshire Yeomanry for service as a Royal Artillery regiment. The Duke of Lancaster's Own Yeomanry Honorary Distinction was similar.

=== Honorary colonels ===
- 1896–1912 Francis Egerton, 3rd Earl of Ellesmere
- 1979-1988 Simon Towneley, also Lord Lieutenant of Lancashire.
- –2025: Lt-Col. the Hon. R. C. Assheton
- 2025–present : Lt-Col. Mike Glover, TD

== See also ==
- Yeomanry
- Lancashire Hussars
- Manchester and Salford Yeomanry
- Imperial Yeomanry
- List of Yeomanry Regiments 1908
- Yeomanry order of precedence
- British yeomanry during the First World War
- Second line yeomanry regiments of the British Army
- List of British Army Yeomanry Regiments converted to Royal Artillery
- Royal Mercian and Lancastrian Yeomanry
- Queen's Own Yeomanry

== Bibliography ==
- L.S. Amery (ed), The Times History of the War in South Africa 1899-1902, London: Sampson Low, Marston, 6 Vols 1900–09.
- Anon, Regimental Badges and Service Caps, London: George Philip & Sons, 1941.
- Anon, British Army of the Rhine Battlefield Tour: Operation Bluecoat, Germany: BAOR, 1947/Uckfield: Naval and Military Press, 2021, ISBN 978-1-78331-812-4.
- Maj A.F. Becke,History of the Great War: Order of Battle of Divisions, Part 3a: New Army Divisions (9–26), London: HM Stationery Office, 1938/Uckfield: Naval & Military Press, 2007, ISBN 1-847347-41-X.
- Ian F.W. Beckett, Riflemen Form: A Study of the Rifle Volunteer Movement 1859–1908, Aldershot: Ogilby Trusts, 1982, ISBN 0 85936 271 X.
- Brereton, John (1992). Chain Mail; the History of the Duke of Lancaster's Own Yeomanry 1798–1991. Chippenham: Picton Publishers. ISBN 0-948251-67-0.
- Collier, Basil (2004). The defence of the United Kingdom. London: Naval & Military Press. ISBN 1-84574-055-6. OCLC 499176250.
- Col John K. Dunlop, The Development of the British Army 1899–1914, London: Methuen, 1938.
- Brig-Gen Sir James E. Edmonds, History of the Great War: Military Operations, France and Belgium 1918, Vol I, The German March Offensive and its Preliminaries, London: Macmillan, 1935/Imperial War Museum and Battery Press, 1995, ISBN 0-89839-219-5/Uckfield: Naval & Military Press, 2009, ISBN 978-1-84574-725-1.
- Brig-Gen Sir James E. Edmonds, History of the Great War: Military Operations, France and Belgium 1918, Vol IV, 8th August–26th September: The Franco-British Offensive, London: Macmillan, 1939/Uckfield: Imperial War Museum and Naval & Military, 2009, ISBN 978-1-845747-28-2.
- Brig-Gen Sir James E. Edmonds & Lt-Col R. Maxwell-Hyslop, History of the Great War: Military Operations, France and Belgium 1918, Vol V, 26th September–11th November, The Advance to Victory, London: HM Stationery Office, 1947/Imperial War Museum and Battery Press, 1993, ISBN 1-870423-06-2/Uckfield: Naval & Military Press, 2021, ISBN 978-1-78331-624-3.
- Maj L.F. Ellis, History of the Second World War, United Kingdom Military Series: Victory in the West, Vol I: The Battle of Normandy, London: HM Stationery Office, 1962/Uckfield: Naval & Military, 2004, ISBN 1-845740-58-0.
- Maj L.F. Ellis, History of the Second World War, United Kingdom Military Series: Victory in the West, Vol II: The Defeat of Germany, London: HM Stationery Office, 1968/Uckfield: Naval & Military, 2004, ISBN 1-845740-59-9.* J.B.M. Frederick, Lineage Book of British Land Forces 1660–1978, Vol I, Wakefield, Microform Academic, 1984, ISBN 1-85117-007-3.
- J.B.M. Frederick, Lineage Book of British Land Forces 1660–1978, Vol II, Wakefield: Microform Academic, 1984, ISBN 1-85117-009-X.
- Brig E.A. James, British Regiments 1914–18, London: Samson Books, 1978, ISBN 0-906304-03-2/Uckfield: Naval & Military Press, 2001, ISBN 978-1-84342-197-9.
- Lt-Col H.F. Joslen, Orders of Battle, United Kingdom and Colonial Formations and Units in the Second World War, 1939–1945, London: HM Stationery Office, 1960/London: London Stamp Exchange, 1990, ISBN 0-948130-03-2/ Uckfield: Naval & Military Press, 2003, ISBN 1-843424-74-6.
- N.B. Leslie, Battle Honours of the British and Indian Armies 1695–1914, London: Leo Cooper, 1970, ISBN 0-85052-004-5.
- Norman E.H. Litchfield, The Territorial Artillery 1908–1988 (Their Lineage, Uniforms and Badges), Nottingham: Sherwood Press, 1992, ISBN 0-9508205-2-0.
- Lt-Gen H.G. Martin, The History of the Fifteenth Scottish Division 1939–1945, Edinburgh: Blackwood, 1948/Uckfield: Naval & Military Press, 2014, ISBN 978-1-78331-085-2.
- Mileham, Patrick (1994). The Yeomanry Regiments; 200 Years of Tradition. Edinburgh: Canongate Academic. ISBN 1-898410-36-4.
- Rinaldi, Richard A (2008). Order of Battle of the British Army 1914. Ravi Rikhye. ISBN 978-0-9776072-8-0.
- Col H.C.B. Rogers, The Mounted Troops of the British Army 1066–1945, London: Seeley Service, 1959.
- Tpr Cosmo Rose-Innes, With Paget's Horse to the Front, London: John McQueen, 1901/Leopold Classic Library, 2015, ASIN: B019SZWY6K.
- Lt-Col Ernest Ryan, 'Arms, Uniforms and Equipment of the Yeomanry Cavalry', Journal of the Society for Army Historical Research, September 1957, Vol 35, pp. 124–33.
- Tim Saunders, Battleground Europe: Operation Epsom: Normandy, June 1944, Barnsley: Pen & Sword, 2003, ISBN 0-85052-954-9.
- Tim Saunders, Battleground Europe: Normandy: Hill 112, Battles of the Odon – 1944, Barnsley: Pen & Sword, 2000, ISBN 978-0-85052-737-7.
- Tim Saunders, Battleground Europe: Operation Plunder: The British and Canadian Rhine Crossing, Barnsley: Pen & Sword, 2006, ISBN 1-84415-221-9.
- Edward M. Spiers, The Army and Society 1815–1914, London: Longmans, 1980, ISBN 0-582-48565-7.
- Col C.P. Stacey, Official History of the Canadian Army in the Second World War, Vol III: The Victory Campaign – The Operations in North-West Europe 1944–1945, Ottawa: Queen's Printer & Controller of Stationery, 1960. Archived 21 December 2020 at the Wayback Machine
- Philip Talbot, 'The English Yeomanry in the Nineteenth Century and the Great Boer War', Journal of the Society for Army Historical Research, Spring 2001, Vol 79, No 317, pp. 45–62.
- War Office, Titles and Designations of Formations and Units of the Territorial Army, London: War Office, 7 November 1927 (RA sections also summarised in Litchfield, Appendix IV).

=== External links ===
- Anglo-Boer War
- Chris Baker, The Long, Long Trail
- 'Canada and the South African War', Canadian War Museum
- Great War Centenary Drill Halls
- Imperial War Museum, War Memorials Register
- Orders of Battle at Patriot Files
- T.F. Mills, Land Forces of Britain, the Empire and Commonwealth – Regiments.org (archive site)
- Royal Artillery 1939–45.
- Roll of Honour
- Graham Watson, The Territorial Army 1947
