= Queen's Own Mercian Yeomanry =

- Active: 1971 – 1992
- Country: United Kingdom
- Branch: British Army
- Type: Yeomanry
- Size: Regiment
- Part of: Royal Armoured Corps

The Queen's Own Mercian Yeomanry was a cavalry regiment of the Territorial Army, formed in 1971 by the reconstitution of squadrons from the Queen's Own Warwickshire and Worcestershire Yeomanry, the Staffordshire Yeomanry and the Shropshire Yeomanry. It amalgamated into the Royal Mercian and Lancastrian Yeomanry in 1992.

== History ==
The regiment was created as The Mercian Yeomanry, the Territorial Army's fourth yeomanry regiment, with three squadrons in 1971. It adopted the title of The Queen's Own Mercian Yeomanry in 1973, and in 1982 converted to a light formation reconnaissance regiment, intended for home defence, and equipped with Land Rovers. In 1988, it absorbed a fourth squadron from the Royal Army Ordnance Corps which became part of the Home Service Force. In 1992, following the Options for Change reductions in the Army, it amalgamated with The Duke of Lancaster's Own Yeomanry to form the Royal Mercian and Lancastrian Yeomanry.

== Organisation ==
The regiment had three reconnaissance squadrons and a regimental headquarters:

- A (Warwickshire and Worcestershire Yeomanry) Squadron
- B (Staffordshire Yeomanry) Squadron
- C (Shropshire Yeomanry) Squadron
- The regimental headquarters is based at Dawley Bank in Telford, Shropshire.

== Bibliography ==
- Mileham, Patrick (1994). The Yeomanry Regiments; 200 Years of Tradition. Edinburgh: Canongate Academic. ISBN 1-898410-36-4.
