= Yeomanry =

Designation used by a number of units or sub-units of the British Army Reserve

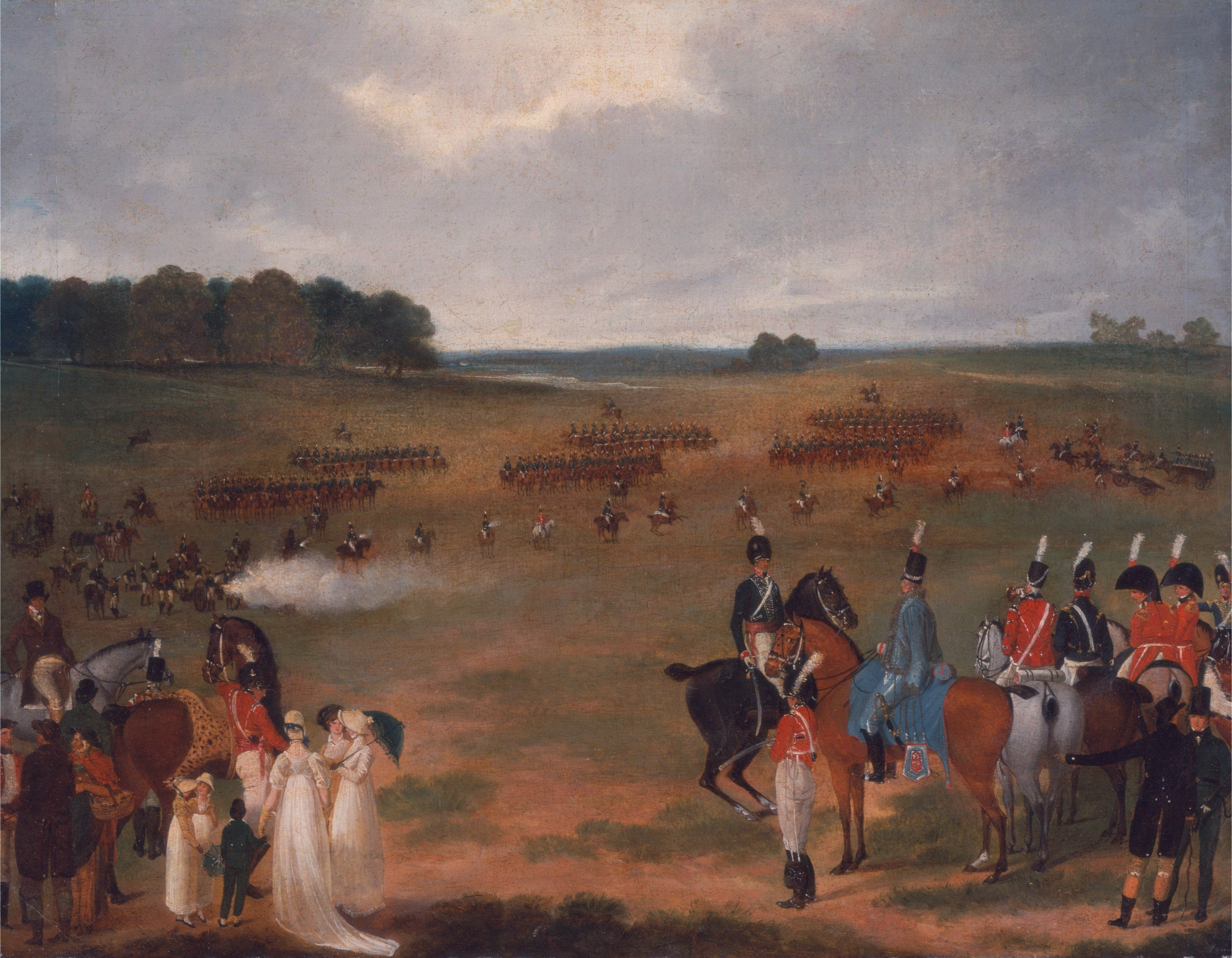
An 1804 review of yeomanry troops in Hyde Park, London.

Yeomanry is a designation used by a number of units and sub-units in the British Army Reserve which are descended from volunteer cavalry regiments that now serve in a variety of different roles.

== History ==
=== Origins ===
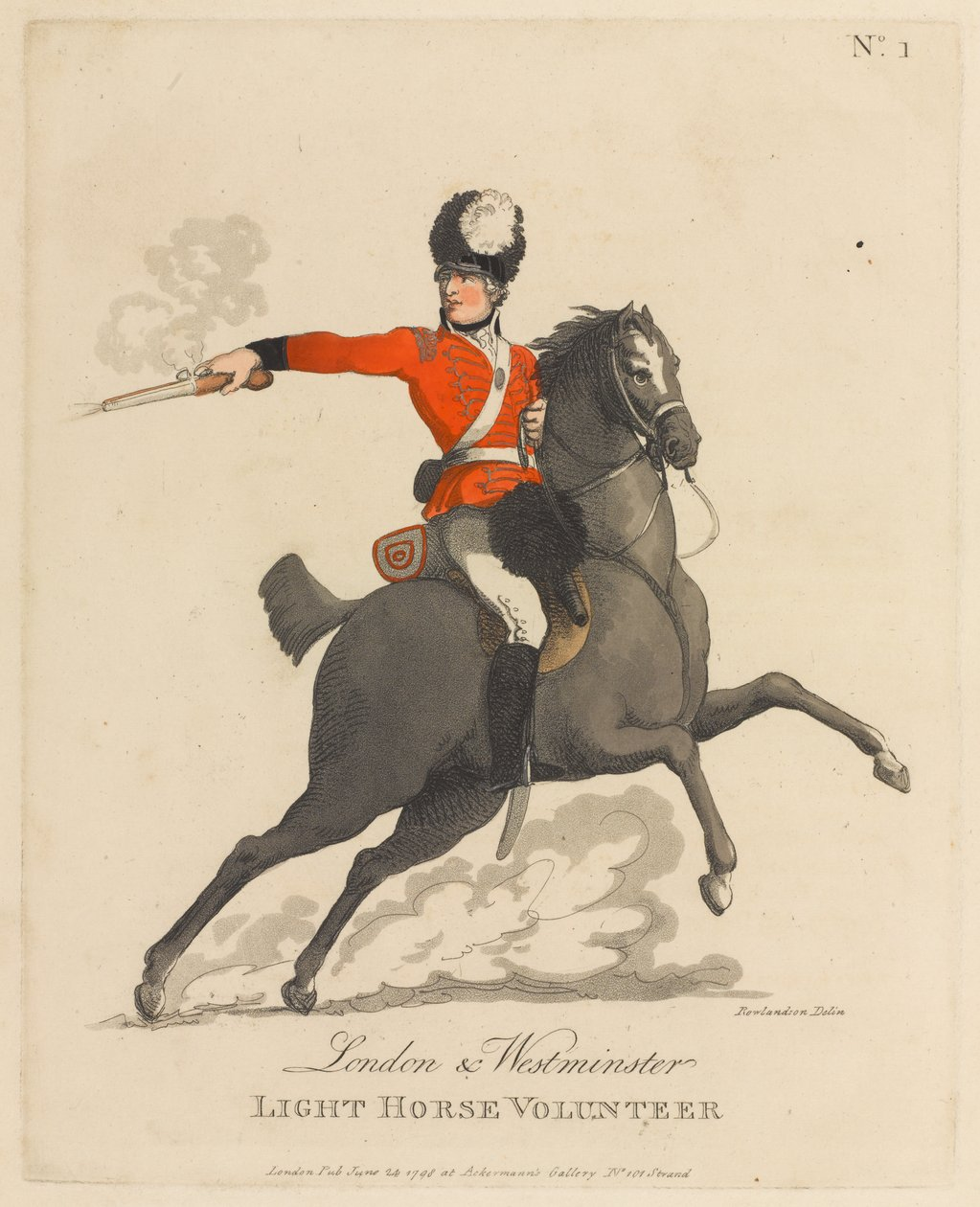
c. 1798 engraving of a London and Westminster Light Horse trooper

In the 1790s, following the French Revolution and the rise of Napoleon Bonaparte, the perceived threat of invasion of the Kingdom of Great Britain was high. To improve the country's defences, Volunteer regiments were raised in many counties from yeomen. While the word "yeoman" in normal use meant a small farmer who owned his land, Yeomanry officers were drawn from the nobility or the landed gentry, and many of the men were the officers' tenants or had other forms of obligation to the officers. At its formation, the force was referred to as the Yeomanry Cavalry. Members of the yeomanry were not obliged to serve overseas without their individual consent.

=== Early 19th century ===
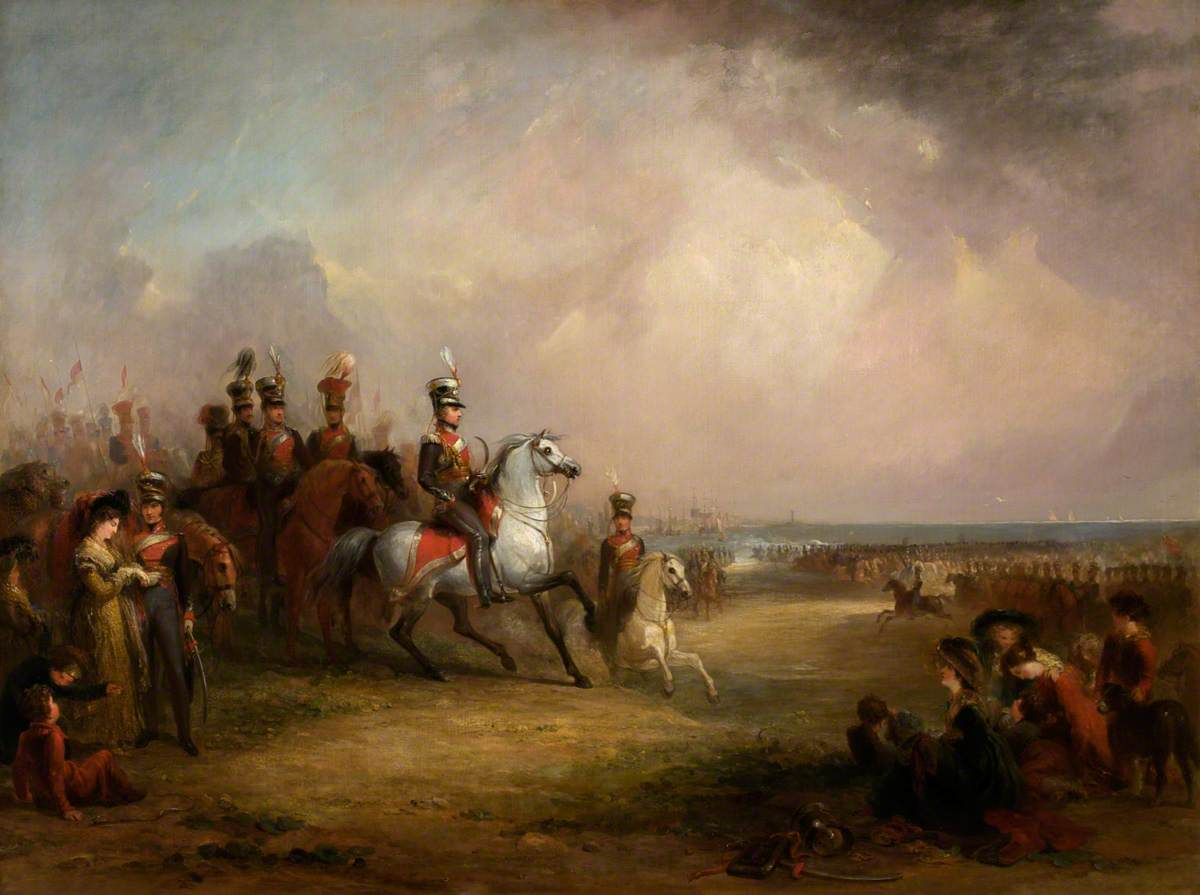
Sir John Leicester and the Cheshire Yeomanry Exercising on the Sands at Liverpool by George Jones, 1824

During the first half of the nineteenth century, Yeomanry Regiments were used extensively in support of the civil authority to quell riots and civil disturbances, including the Peterloo Massacre; as police forces were created and took over this role, the Yeomanry concentrated on local defence. In 1827, it was decided for financial reasons to reduce the number of yeomanry regiments, disbanding those that had not been required to assist the civil power over the previous decade. A number of independent troops were also dissolved. Following these reductions, the yeomanry establishment was fixed at 22 corps (regiments) receiving allowances and a further 16 serving without pay.

During the 1830s, the number of yeomanry units fluctuated, reflecting the level of civil unrest in any particular region at any particular time. The Irish Yeomanry, which had played a major role in suppressing the rebellion of 1798, was completely disbanded in 1838.

=== Mid and late 19th century ===
For the next thirty years, the Yeomanry Force was retained as a second line of support for the regular cavalry within Britain. Recruiting difficulties led to serious consideration being given to the disbandment of the entire force in 1870, but instead measures were taken the following year to improve its effectiveness. These included requirements that individual yeomanry troopers attend a minimum number of drills per year in return for a "permanent duty" allowance, and that units be maintained at a specific strength. Yeomanry officers and permanent drill instructors were required to undergo training at a newly established School of Instruction and the Secretary of State for War took over responsibility for the force, from individual Lords Lieutenant of counties. While these reforms improved the professionalism of the Yeomanry Force, numbers remained low (only 10,617 in 1881).

In 1876, the role of the Yeomanry Force was fixed as that of light cavalry. During the previous decades, horse artillery troops had been raised to be attached to a number of yeomanry regiments and dismounted detachments appeared where horses were not available in sufficient numbers. These supernumerary units were now abolished.

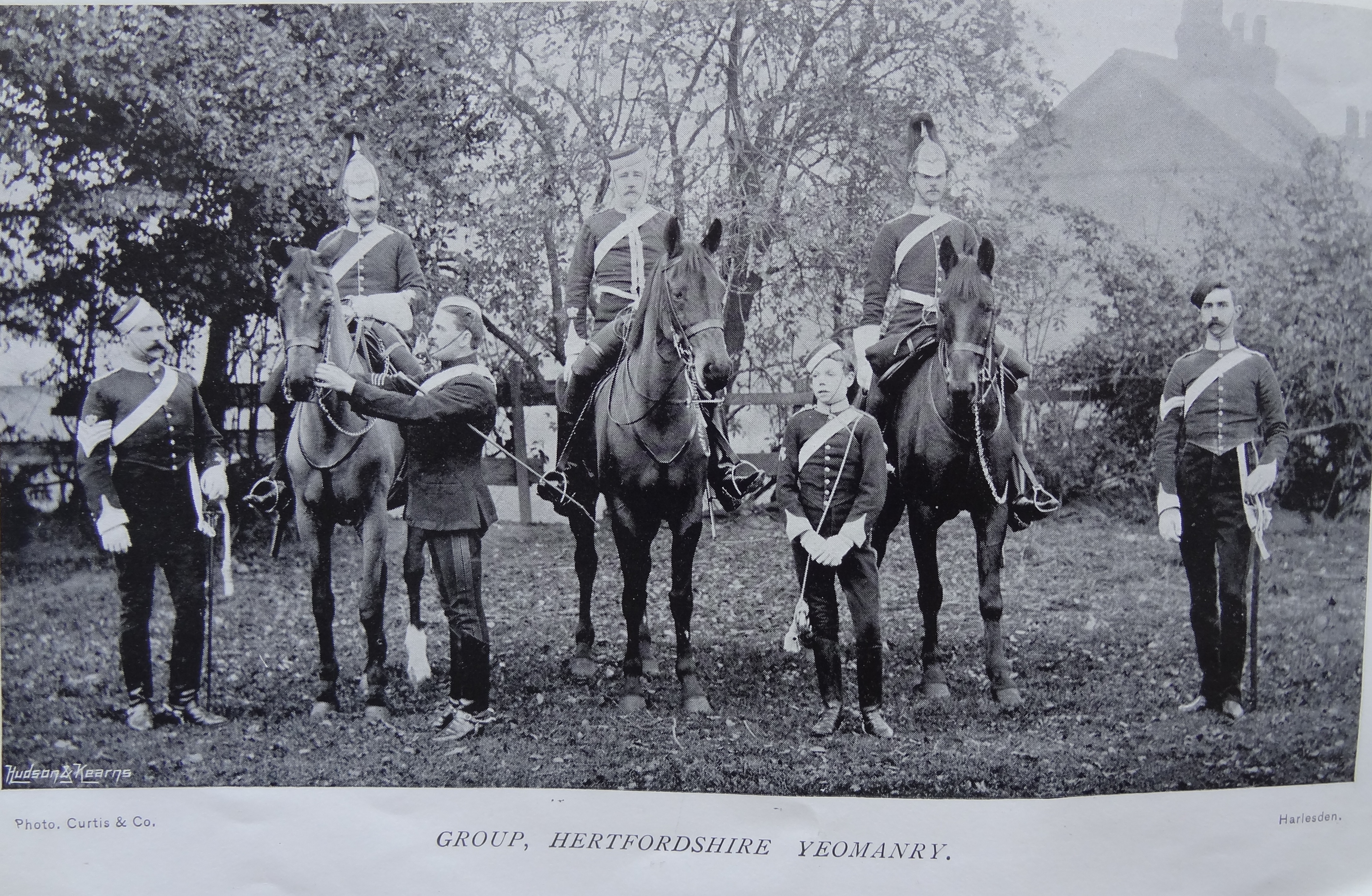
Hertfordshire Yeomanry in the 1890s

=== Boer War ===
During the Second Boer War, companies of Imperial Yeomanry were formed to serve overseas from volunteers from the Yeomanry. In 1901, all yeomanry regiments were redesignated as "Imperial Yeomanry", and reorganised. In 1908, the Imperial Yeomanry was merged with the Volunteer Force to form the Territorial Force, of which it became the cavalry arm. The "Imperial" title was dropped at the same time.

=== World War I and later ===
On the eve of World War I in 1914, there were 55 Yeomanry regiments (with two more formed in August 1914), each of four squadrons instead of the three of the regular cavalry. Upon embodiment, these regiments were either brought together to form mounted brigades or allocated as divisional cavalry. For purposes of recruitment and administration, the Yeomanry were linked to specific counties or regions, identified in the regimental title. Some of the units still in existence in 1914 dated back to those created in the 1790s, while others had been created during a period of expansion following on the Boer War.

After the First World War, the Territorial Force was disbanded and later reformed and redesignated as the Territorial Army. Following the experience of the war, only the fourteen senior yeomanry regiments retained their horses, with the rest being re-designated as armoured car companies, artillery, engineers, or signals. Two regiments were disbanded. The converted units retained their yeomanry traditions, with some artillery regiments having individual batteries representing different yeomanry units.

=== World War II ===
On the eve of the Second World War in 1939, the Territorial Army was doubled in size, with duplicate units formed; this led to some regiments being de-amalgamated. The last mounted regiment of yeomanry was the Queen's Own Yorkshire Dragoons, who were converted to an armoured role in March 1942, and later converted into an infantry battalion of the King's Own Yorkshire Light Infantry—KOYLI. Volunteers from the Yeomanry served in the Long Range Desert Group from 1940 through to 1943, incorporated into "Y Patrol".

=== Post-war ===
There were reductions in the size of the TA in both 1957 and 1961, which led to the amalgamation of some pairs of yeomanry regiments. There was a major reduction in reserve forces in 1967 with the formation of the Territorial and Army Volunteer Reserve; all existing yeomanry regiments were reduced to squadron, company or battery sub-units. A number of further reorganisations have taken place since then.

== Current Yeomanry regiments ==
In the current Army Reserve, several remnants of former Yeomanry regiments are still serving, usually as a sub-unit of a larger unit:

- Royal Yeomanry
  - A (Sherwood Rangers Yeomanry) Squadron
  - B (Warwickshire and Worcestershire Yeomanry) Squadron
  - C (Kent and Sharpshooters Yeomanry) Squadron (Croydon)
  - D (Shropshire Yeomanry) Squadron
  - E (Leicestershire and Derbyshire Yeomanry) Squadron
  - F (Westminster Dragoons) Squadron
  - The Royal Yeomanry Band (Inns of Court & City Yeomanry)
- Royal Wessex Yeomanry
  - A (Dorset Yeomanry) Squadron
  - B (Royal Wiltshire Yeomanry) Squadron
  - C (Royal Gloucestershire Hussars) Squadron
  - D (Royal Devon Yeomanry) Squadron
- Queen's Own Yeomanry
  - A (Yorkshire Yeomanry) Squadron
  - B (Duke of Lancaster's Own Yeomanry) Squadron
  - C (Cheshire Yeomanry) Squadron
  - D (Northumberland Hussars) Squadron
- Scottish and North Irish Yeomanry
  - A (Ayrshire (Earl of Carrick's Own) Yeomanry) Squadron
  - B (North Irish Horse) Squadron
  - C (Fife and Forfar Yeomanry/Scottish Horse) Squadron
  - E (Lothians and Border Horse) Squadron
  - HQ (Lovat Scouts) Squadron

== Other remnants of yeomanry units ==
Royal Artillery

- 100th (Yeomanry) Regiment Royal Artillery
  - 255 (Somerset Yeomanry) Battery
- 103rd (Lancashire Artillery Volunteers) Regiment Royal Artillery
  - 210 (Staffordshire) Battery
    - C (South Nottinghamshire Hussars) Troop
- 104th Regiment Royal Artillery
  - 211 (South Wales) Battery
    - C (Glamorgan Yeomanry) Troop
- 106th (Yeomanry) Regiment Royal Artillery
  - 295 (Hampshire Yeomanry) Battery
  - 457 (Hampshire Carabiniers Yeomanry) Battery

Royal Engineers

- 101 (City of London) Engineer Regiment
  - 579 Field Squadron (EOD&S)
    - 1 (Sussex Yeomanry) Field Troop
    - 2 (Surrey Yeomanry) Field Troop

Royal Corps of Signals

- 32nd Signal Regiment
  - 40 (North Irish Horse) Signal Squadron
- 37 Signal Regiment
  - 54 (Queen's Own Warwickshire and Worcestershire Yeomanry) Support Squadron
- 39th (Skinners) Signal Regiment
  - 93 (North Somerset Yeomanry) Support Squadron
  - 94 (Berkshire Yeomanry) Signal Squadron
- 71st (City of London) Yeomanry Signal Regiment
  - 31 (Middlesex Yeomanry and Princess Louise's Kensington) Signal Squadron
  - 36 (Essex Yeomanry) Signal Squadron
  - 68 (Inns of Court & City Yeomanry) Signal Squadron
  - 265 (Kent and County of London Yeomanry (Sharpshooters)) Support Squadron

Army Air Corps

- 6 Regiment Army Air Corps
  - No. 677 (Suffolk and Norfolk Yeomanry) Squadron Army Air Corps

Royal Logistic Corps

- 157 (Welsh) Regiment RLC
  - 224 (Pembroke Yeomanry) Squadron
  - 398 (Flint & Denbighshire Yeomanry) Squadron
- 165 Port and Maritime Regiment RLC
  - 142 (Queen's Own Oxfordshire Hussars) Vehicle Squadron
  - 710 (Royal Buckinghamshire Hussars) Operational Hygiene Squadron

First Aid Nursing Yeomanry (Princess Royal's Volunteer Corps)
In 1907 the First Aid Nursing Yeomanry was established as an all female volunteer organisation to provide a link between field hospitals and the front line, with their primary role being to rescue the wounded, rather than provide nursing care. Because the organisation as initially formed was mounted it adopted the yeomanry name. The First Aid Nursing Yeomanry is an independent charity that is not part of the Armed Forces, today it provides teams to aid civil agencies.

== See also ==
- Imperial Yeomanry
- Yeomanry order of precedence
- List of Yeomanry Regiments 1908
- List of British Army Yeomanry Regiments converted to Royal Artillery

Other uses of yeoman:

- Yeomen Warders of His Majesty's Royal Palace and Fortress the Tower of London
- Yeomen of the Guard, the King's Body Guard
