= 3rd Mounted Division =

WW1 British Army formation

2/2nd Mounted Division 3rd Mounted Division 1st Mounted Division The Cyclist Division
- Active: 6 March 1915 – June 1919
- Country: United Kingdom
- Branch: British Army
- Type: Yeomanry; Bicycle infantry
- Size: Division
- Service: World War I

Commanders
- Notable commanders: John Burn-Murdoch

The 3rd Mounted Division was a Yeomanry Division of the British Army active during World War I. It was formed on 6 March 1915 as the 2/2nd Mounted Division, a replacement/depot formation for the 2nd Mounted Division which was being sent abroad on active service. In March 1916, it was renumbered as the 3rd Mounted Division and in July 1916 as the 1st Mounted Division. In September 1917, the division was reorganized as a cyclist formation and redesignated as The Cyclist Division. It remained in the United Kingdom throughout the war and was disbanded in June 1919.

== History ==
=== 2/2nd Mounted Division ===
In accordance with the Territorial and Reserve Forces Act 1907 (7 Edw. 7, c.9) which brought the Territorial Force into being, the TF was intended to be a home defence force for service during wartime and members could not be compelled to serve outside the country. However, on the outbreak of war on 4 August 1914, many members volunteered for Imperial Service. Therefore, TF units were split into 1st Line (liable for overseas service) and 2nd Line (home service for those unable or unwilling to serve overseas) units. 2nd Line units performed the home defence role, although in fact most of these were also posted abroad in due course. Likewise, existing pre-war formations (brigades and divisions) formed duplicate 2nd Lines with the same structure as their 1st Line parents.

On 2 September 1914, the 2nd Mounted Division was formed in and around the Churn area of Berkshire with the 1st South Midland, 2nd South Midland, Nottinghamshire and Derbyshire, and London Mounted Brigades. In November 1914, the division moved to Norfolk on coastal defence duties and in March 1915 the division was put on warning for overseas service.

Consequently, the 2/2nd Mounted Division was formed on 6 March 1915 to replace the 2nd Mounted Division and took over the home defence role of guarding the Norfolk coast against a possible invasion. It comprised the 2nd Line formations of all units in the 2nd Mounted Division so 2/1st South Midland, 2/2nd South Midland, 2/1st Nottinghamshire and Derbyshire, and 2/1st London Mounted Brigades.

Each 2nd Line unit formed at their original depots and were scattered across London and the Midlands. They had to assemble on the East Coast to form the division. Once assembled, divisional headquarters was at King's Lynn and the brigades at Narborough, Hunstanton, King's Lynn, and Aylsham. Once assembled, it was assigned to the First Army (Home Forces) and was responsible for the defence of the East Coast. In common with the other 2nd Line divisions, the division experienced considerable problems with regard to equipment. Although relatively strong in manpower (the yeomanry regiments had between 410 and 498 men, three of the Royal Horse Artillery batteries averaged over 200, one only had 91), the division was short of horses (one regiment had just 5, another 99), rifles (the most that any regiment had was 206), and other equipment.

At first, rather than growing in size, the division shrunk as men were drafted off to active units overseas. The division also suffered lack of equipment; the artillery batteries were issued with the older 15 pounder Breech Loading Converted rather than the 15 pounder Quick Firing gun that was the standard weapon of first line TF RHA units. There was also a lack of Lee–Enfield rifles, and some soldiers had Japanese-made carbines instead.

=== 3rd Mounted Division ===
On 20 March 1916, the 2/2nd Mounted Division was renumbered as the 3rd Mounted Division on the same date that the 4th Mounted Division was formed. The brigades were numbered on 31 March; the division now commanded the 9th, 10th, 11th, and 12th Mounted Brigades and the other support units (signals, medical, supply) were numbered accordingly.

=== 1st Mounted Division ===
In July 1916 there was a major reorganization of 2nd Line yeomanry units in the United Kingdom. All but 12 regiments were converted to cyclists: the rest were dismounted, handed over their horses to the remount depots and were issued with bicycles. (Note: Nine of these regiments remained with the division – 2/1st Warwickshire Yeomanry, 2/1st Sherwood Rangers Yeomanry, 2/1st Royal Buckinghamshire Hussars, 2/1st Hertfordshire Yeomanry, 2/1st Royal 1st Devon Yeomanry, 2/1st Queen's Own West Kent Yeomanry, 2/1st Montgomeryshire Yeomanry, 2/1st Fife and Forfar Yeomanry, and 2/1st Essex Yeomanry. Three more regiments were employed as divisional cavalry – 2/1st Queen's Own Royal Glasgow Yeomanry, 2/1st Bedfordshire Yeomanry, and 2/1st Northamptonshire Yeomanry.) The 1st Mounted Division was converted to 1st Cyclist Division and the 4th Mounted Division to 2nd Cyclist Division. At the same time, the 3rd Mounted Division was renumbered as the 1st Mounted Division as it was the only remaining mounted division: the other mounted division, 2nd Mounted Division, had been broken up in Egypt on 21 January 1916. At this time the division was reorganized. It now consisted of three mounted brigades (1st, 2nd, and 3rd) and a cyclist brigade (9th) and once again the support units were renumbered.

At this time, the division was assigned to General Reserve, Home Defence Troops. The headquarters was at Brentwood, Essex along with two of the mounted brigades; the third was near Maidstone, and the cyclist brigade at Bridge, Bishopsbourne, and Bekesbourne (all in Kent). In October, the brigade at Maidstone moved to West Malling and the cyclists were concentrated at Bridge. In November, the cyclist brigade was renumbered as the 5th Cyclist Brigade. (Note: 1st – 8th Cyclist Brigades of the 1st and 2nd Cyclist Divisions were reorganized as the 1st – 4th Cyclist Brigades when their divisions were broken up in November 1916. Higher numbered cyclist brigades (9th – 14th) were subsequently renumbered as the 5th – 10th Cyclist Brigades.)

In May 1917, divisional headquarters moved to Sevenoaks and the brigades were at Brentwood, West Malling, Sevenoaks and Bridge (the cyclist brigade).

=== The Cyclist Division ===
In mid August 1917, the division was issued with bicycles; from now on it would be the training and draft-finding formation for overseas cyclist units and the Army Cyclist Corps. All trained cavalrymen were transferred to the Reserve Cavalry Regiments. On 4 September 1917 the division was renamed again, this time as The Cyclist Division and the mounted brigades redesignated as the 11th, 12th and 13th Cyclist Brigades. The 5th Cyclist brigade became independent, but rejoined the division in December when the 13th Cyclist Brigade was broken up.

In March 1918, the headquarters and two of the brigades were at Canterbury and the other at Littlebourne, Ash, and Wingham as part of the Independent Force, Home Defence Troops. By the end of the war in November 1918, the division was concentrated at Canterbury.

Disbandment of the division started in March 1919 and was complete by June. Throughout its existence, from March 1915, the division remained in the England on Home Defence duties.

== Orders of battle ==
2/2nd Mounted Division – 6 March 1915 to 20 March 1916
On formation on 6 March 1915, the 2/2nd Mounted Division commanded the following units:
2/1st Nottinghamshire and Derbyshire Mounted Brigade (Note: 2/1st Nottinghamshire and Derbyshire Mounted Brigade was numbered as 9th Mounted Brigade on 31 March 1916.): 2/1st Sherwood Rangers Yeomanry; 2/1st South Nottinghamshire Hussars; 2/1st Derbyshire Yeomanry	Royal Horse Artillery (RHA): 2/1st Nottinghamshire RHA and Notts. and Derby. Ammunition Column; 2/1st Warwickshire RHA and 1st South Midland Ammunition Column; 2/1st Berkshire RHA and 2nd South Midland Ammunition Column; 2/A Battery, HAC and London Ammunition Column; Signal Service: 2/1st Notts. and Derby. Signal Troop; 2/1st South Midland Signal Troop; 2/2nd South Midland Signal Troop; 2/1st London Signal Troop; Medical: 2/1st Notts. and Derby. Field Ambulance, RAMC; 2/1st South Midland Field Ambulance, RAMC; 2/2nd South Midland Field Ambulance, RAMC; 2/1st London Field Ambulance, RAMC; 2/2nd Mounted Division Train: 2/1st Notts. and Derby. Transport and Supply Column, ASC; 2/1st South Midland Transport and Supply Column, ASC; 2/2nd South Midland Transport and Supply Column, ASC; 2/1st London Transport and Supply Column, ASC
2/1st South Midland Mounted Brigade (Note: 2/1st South Midland Mounted Brigade was numbered as 10th Mounted Brigade on 31 March 1916.): 2/1st Warwickshire Yeomanry; 2/1st Royal Gloucestershire Hussars; 2/1st Queen's Own Worcestershire Hussars; 1/1st Inverness-shire RHA (Note: 1/1st Inverness-shire RHA was attached to 2/1st South Midland Mounted Brigade from March 1915; in February 1916 it left for Egypt.); 2/1st Inverness-shire RHA (Note: 2/1st Inverness-shire RHA was attached to 2/1st South Midland Mounted Brigade from March 1915; it left for Lark Hill on 18 December 1915.)
2/2nd South Midland Mounted Brigade (Note: 2/2nd South Midland Mounted Brigade was numbered as 11th Mounted Brigade on 31 March 1916.): 2/1st Royal Buckinghamshire Hussars; 2/1st Berkshire Yeomanry; 2/1st Queen's Own Oxfordshire Hussars
2/1st London Mounted Brigade (Note: 2/1st London Mounted Brigade was numbered as 12th Mounted Brigade on 31 March 1916.): 2/1st County of London Yeomanry; 2/1st City of London Yeomanry (Rough Riders); 2/3rd County of London Yeomanry (Sharpshooters)

3rd Mounted Division – 20 March 1916 to July 1916
On 20 March 1916, the 2/2nd Mounted Division was renumbered as the 3rd Mounted Division and the brigades were numbered on 31 March:
9th Mounted Brigade (2/1st Nottinghamshire and Derbyshire) (Note: 9th Mounted Brigade (2/1st Nottinghamshire and Derbyshire) was reformed as 9th Cyclist Brigade in July 1916.): 2/1st Sherwood Rangers Yeomanry; 2/1st South Nottinghamshire Hussars; 2/1st Derbyshire Yeomanry	Royal Horse Artillery (RHA): 2/1st Nottinghamshire RHA and Ammunition Column; 2/1st Warwickshire RHA and Ammunition Column; 2/1st Berkshire RHA and Ammunition Column; 2/A Battery, HAC and Ammunition Column; Signal Service: 9th Mounted Brigade Signal Troop; 10th Mounted Brigade Signal Troop; 11th Mounted Brigade Signal Troop; 12th Mounted Brigade Signal Troop; 3rd Mounted Division Signal Squadron; Medical: 9th Mounted Brigade Field Ambulance, RAMC; 10th Mounted Brigade Field Ambulance, RAMC; 11th Mounted Brigade Field Ambulance, RAMC; 12th Mounted Brigade Field Ambulance, RAMC; 2/2nd Mounted Division Train: 9th Mounted Brigade Transport and Supply Column, ASC; 10th Mounted Brigade Transport and Supply Column, ASC; 11th Mounted Brigade Transport and Supply Column, ASC; 12th Mounted Brigade Transport and Supply Column, ASC; 3rd Mounted Division Company, ASC
10th Mounted Brigade (2/1st South Midland) (Note: 10th Mounted Brigade (2/1st South Midland) was transferred to 2nd Cyclist Division (former 4th Mounted Division) in July 1916 and was redesignated as 8th Cyclist Brigade. 2/1st Berkshire Yeomanry of 11th Mounted Brigade (2/2nd South Midland) exchanged places with 2/1st Warwickshire Yeomanry.): 2/1st Warwickshire Yeomanry; 2/1st Royal Gloucestershire Hussars; 2/1st Queen's Own Worcestershire Hussars
11th Mounted Brigade (2/2nd South Midland) (Note: The 2/1st Warwickshire Yeomanry and the 2/1st Sherwood Rangers Yeomanry joined the 2/1st Royal Buckinghamshire Hussars in the 11th Mounted Brigade (2/2nd South Midland) in July 1916 which was renumbered as 1st Mounted Brigade.): 2/1st Royal Buckinghamshire Hussars; 2/1st Berkshire Yeomanry; 2/1st Queen's Own Oxfordshire Hussars
12th Mounted Brigade (2/1st London) (Note: 12th Mounted Brigade (2/1st London) transferred to 1st Cyclist Division (former 1st Mounted Division) in July 1916 and was redesignated as 4th Cyclist Brigade.): 2/1st County of London Yeomanry; 2/1st City of London Yeomanry (Rough Riders); 2/3rd County of London Yeomanry (Sharpshooters)

1st Mounted Division – July 1916 to November 1916
In July 1916, the 3rd Mounted Division was renumbered as the 1st Mounted Division and was extensively reorganized:
1st Mounted Brigade (Note: The 2/1st Warwickshire Yeomanry and the 2/1st Sherwood Rangers Yeomanry joined the 2/1st Royal Buckinghamshire Hussars in the 11th Mounted Brigade (2/2nd South Midland) in July 1916 which was renumbered as 1st Mounted Brigade.): 2/1st Warwickshire Yeomanry; 2/1st Sherwood Rangers Yeomanry; 2/1st Royal Buckinghamshire Hussars	Royal Horse Artillery (RHA): 2/1st Nottinghamshire RHA and Ammunition Column; 2/1st Warwickshire RHA and Ammunition Column; 2/1st Berkshire RHA and Ammunition Column; 2/A Battery, HAC and Ammunition Column; Signal Service: 1st Mounted Brigade Signal Troop; 2nd Mounted Brigade Signal Troop; 3rd Mounted Brigade Signal Troop; 9th Cyclist Brigade Signal Troop; 1st Mounted Division Signal Squadron; Medical: 1st Mounted Brigade Field Ambulance, RAMC; 2nd Mounted Brigade Field Ambulance, RAMC; 3rd Mounted Brigade Field Ambulance, RAMC; 9th Cyclist Brigade Field Ambulance, RAMC; 1st Mounted Division Train: 1st Mounted Brigade Transport and Supply Column, ASC; 2nd Mounted Brigade Transport and Supply Column, ASC; 3rd Mounted Brigade Transport and Supply Column, ASC; 9th Cyclist Brigade Transport and Supply Column, ASC; 1st Mounted Division Company, ASC
2nd Mounted Brigade (Note: The 2/1st Montgomeryshire Yeomanry and the 2/1st Fife and Forfar Yeomanry joined the 2/1st Royal 1st Devon Yeomanry in the 2nd Mounted Brigade (2/2nd South Western) in July 1916. They transferred from the original 1st Mounted Division.): 2/1st Royal 1st Devon Yeomanry (Note: In November 1916, 2/1st Royal 1st Devon Yeomanry amalgamated with the 2/1st Royal North Devon Yeomanry to form the 4th (Royal 1st Devon and North Devon) Yeomanry Cyclist Regiment in the 2nd Cyclist Brigade.); 2/1st Montgomeryshire Yeomanry (Note: In October 1916, 2/1st Montgomeryshire Yeomanry amalgamated with 2/1st Denbighshire Hussars to form the 3rd (Denbigh and Montgomery) Yeomanry Cyclist Regiment in the 1st Cyclist Brigade.); 2/1st Fife and Forfar Yeomanry (Note: In November 1916, 2/1st Fife and Forfar Yeomanry was converted to a cyclist unit in 6th Cyclist Brigade.)
3rd Mounted Brigade (Note: The 2/1st Essex Yeomanry and the 2/1st Hertfordshire Yeomanry joined the 2/1st Queen's Own West Kent Yeomanry in the 14th Mounted Brigade (2/1st South Eastern) in July 1916. They transferred from 4th Mounted Division as the new 3rd Mounted Brigade.): 2/1st Hertfordshire Yeomanry; 2/1st Queen's Own West Kent Yeomanry (Note: In October 1916, the 2/1st Queen's Own West Kent Yeomanry handed its horses over to 2/1st Queen's Own Dorset Yeomanry and in November was merged with the 2/1st Royal East Kent Yeomanry to form 9th (East Kent and West Kent) Yeomanry Cyclist Regiment in 3rd Cyclist Brigade.); 2/1st Essex Yeomanry
9th Cyclist Brigade (Note: 9th Mounted Brigade (2/1st Nottinghamshire and Derbyshire) was redesignated as 9th Cyclist Brigade in July 1916. 2/1st Queen's Own Oxfordshire Hussars of 10th Mounted Brigade (2/1st South Midland) exchanged places with 2/1st Sherwood Rangers Yeomanry.): 2/1st South Nottinghamshire Hussars; 2/1st Derbyshire Yeomanry; 2/1st Queen's Own Oxfordshire Hussars (Note: In February 1917, the 2/1st Queen's Own Oxfordshire Hussars was transferred to the 4th Cyclist Brigade.)

1st Mounted Division – November 1916 to 4 September 1917
In November 1916, as the 1st and 2nd Cyclist Divisions were broken up, the 1st Mounted Division was reorganized:
1st Mounted Brigade (Note: The 1st Mounted Brigade was unaffected by the changes.): 2/1st Warwickshire Yeomanry; 2/1st Sherwood Rangers Yeomanry; 2/1st Royal Buckinghamshire Hussars	Royal Field Artillery (RFA): 393rd Battery, RFA and Ammunition Column; 396th Battery, RFA and Ammunition Column; Signal Service: 1st Mounted Brigade Signal Troop; 2nd Mounted Brigade Signal Troop; 3rd Mounted Brigade Signal Troop; 5th Cyclist Brigade Signal Troop; 1st Mounted Division Signal Squadron; Medical: 336th (East Anglian) Field Ambulance, RAMC; 337th (East Anglian) Field Ambulance, RAMC; 338th (Lowland) Field Ambulance, RAMC; 339th (Lowland) Field Ambulance, RAMC; 1st Mounted Division Train: 1st Mounted Brigade Transport and Supply Column, ASC; 2nd Mounted Brigade Transport and Supply Column, ASC; 3rd Mounted Brigade Transport and Supply Column, ASC; 5th Cyclist Brigade Transport and Supply Column, ASC; 1st Mounted Division Company, ASC
2nd Mounted Brigade (Note: The 3rd Cyclist Brigade (originally 2/1st North Midland Mounted Brigade) was remounted and transferred complete from the 1st Cyclist Division in November 1916.): 2/1st Staffordshire Yeomanry; 2/1st Leicestershire Yeomanry; 2/1st Lincolnshire Yeomanry
3rd Mounted Brigade: 2/1st Queen's Own Dorset Yeomanry (Note: In October 1916, the 2/1st Queen's Own Dorset Yeomanry took over the horses of the 2/1st Queen's Own West Kent Yeomanry and joined the brigade.); 2/1st Hertfordshire Yeomanry; 2/1st Essex Yeomanry
5th Cyclist Brigade (Note: With the breakup of the 1st and 2nd Cyclist Divisions, their brigades (1st – 8th Cyclist Brigades) were reorganized as the 1st – 4th Cyclist Brigades. Consequently, the 9th Cyclist Brigade was renumbered as 5th Cyclist Brigade.): 2/1st South Nottinghamshire Hussars; 2/1st Derbyshire Yeomanry; 2/1st City of London Yeomanry (Rough Riders) (Note: 2/1st City of London Yeomanry (Rough Riders) joined from 2nd Cyclist Brigade in February 1917.)
Attached: 1/7th (Cyclist) Battalion, Devonshire Regiment; 1/6th (Cyclist) Battalion, Royal Sussex Regiment; 2/8th (Cyclist) Battalion, Essex Regiment; 2/1st Kent Cyclist Battalion

The Cyclist Division – 4 September 1917 to the end of the war
On 4 September 1917, the 1st Mounted Division was reorganized as The Cyclist Division:
5th Cyclist Brigade (Note: The 5th Cyclist Brigade was initially made independent in September 1917, but rejoined the division in December to replace the 13th Cyclist Brigade.): 2/1st South Nottinghamshire Hussars; 2/1st Derbyshire Yeomanry; 2/1st City of London Yeomanry (Rough Riders)	Royal Artillery: 393rd Battery, RFA and Ammunition Column; 396th Battery, RFA and Ammunition Column; 2/2nd Lancashire Heavy Battery, RGA; 2/1st Warwickshire Heavy Battery, RGA; Engineers: 563rd (Hampshire) Works Company, Royal Engineers (RE) (Note: Although Becke shows this unit as 'Huntingdonshire', this is clearly an error for 'Hampshire'.); Signal Service: 5th Cyclist Brigade Signal Troop; 11th Cyclist Brigade Signal Troop; 12th Cyclist Brigade Signal Troop; 13th Cyclist Brigade Signal Troop; Cyclist Division Signal Squadron; Medical: 336th (East Anglian) Field Ambulance, RAMC; 337th (East Anglian) Field Ambulance, RAMC; 339th (Lowland) Field Ambulance, RAMC; 126th Sanitary Section; Cyclist Division Train: 5th Cyclist Brigade Transport and Supply Column, ASC; 11th Cyclist Brigade Transport and Supply Column, ASC; 12th Cyclist Brigade Transport and Supply Column, ASC; 13th Cyclist Brigade Transport and Supply Column, ASC; 1st Mounted Division Company, ASC; 69th Railhead Supply Detachment
11th Cyclist Brigade (Note: The 1st Mounted Brigade became the 11th Cyclist Brigade in September 1917.): 2/1st Sherwood Rangers Yeomanry; 2/1st Royal Buckinghamshire Hussars; 1/7th (Cyclist) Battalion, Devonshire Regiment
12th Cyclist Brigade (Note: The 2nd Mounted Brigade became the 12th Cyclist Brigade in September 1917.): 2/1st Staffordshire Yeomanry; 2/1st Leicestershire Yeomanry; 2/1st Lincolnshire Yeomanry
13th Cyclist Brigade (Note: The 3rd Mounted Brigade became the 13th Cyclist Brigade in September 1917. It was broken up in December and replaced by the 5th Cyclist Brigade.): 2/1st Queen's Own Dorset Yeomanry; 2/1st Hertfordshire Yeomanry; 2/1st Essex Yeomanry
Attached: 2/1st Kent Cyclist Battalion

== Commanders ==
The 2/2nd Mounted Division / 3rd Mounted Division / 1st Mounted Division / The Cyclist Division had the following commanders:

From	Rank	Name
6 March 1915	Brigadier-General	J.F. Burn-Murdoch (Note: Brigadier-General J.F. Burn-Murdoch simultaneously commanded the 2/1st Nottinghamshire and Derbyshire Mounted Brigade until 14 April 1916.)
26 May 1916	Major-General	J.F. Burn-Murdoch
4 March 1918	Major-General	Alister Dallas

== See also ==
- List of British divisions in World War I
- British yeomanry during the First World War
- Second line yeomanry regiments of the British Army

== Bibliography ==
- Becke, Archibald F. (1936). Order of Battle of Divisions Part 2A. The Territorial Force Mounted Divisions and the 1st-Line Territorial Force Divisions (42–56). London: HMSO. OCLC 4405016.
- James, Brigadier E.A. (1978). British Regiments 1914–18. London: Samson Books Limited. ISBN 0-906304-03-2.
- Rinaldi, Richard A (2008). Order of Battle of the British Army 1914. Ravi Rikhye. ISBN 978-0-97760728-0.
- Graham E. Watson & Richard A. Rinaldi, The Corps of Royal Engineers: Organization and Units 1889–2018, Tiger Lily Books, 2018, ISBN 978-171790180-4.
