= Warwickshire Royal Horse Artillery =

Former British Army horse artillery battery

Warwickshire Royal Horse Artillery (T.F.) 1/1st Warwickshire RHA (T.F.)
- Cap badge of the Warwickshire Royal Horse Artillery (T.F.)
- Active: 4 June 1908 – 1919
- Country: United Kingdom
- Branch: British Army
- Type: Artillery
- Size: Battery
- Part of: 1st South Midland Mounted Brigade; I Brigade, RHA (T.F.); 2nd Cavalry Division; VII Brigade, RHA; XV Brigade, RHA
- peacetime HQ: Leamington
- Equipment: Ordnance QF 15-pounder Ordnance QF 18-pounder
- Engagements: First World War Western Front

The Warwickshire Royal Horse Artillery was a Territorial Force Royal Horse Artillery battery that was formed in Warwickshire in 1908. It was the first Territorial Force artillery unit to go overseas on active service, spending the whole of the First World War on the Western Front, mostly with 1st Cavalry Division and 29th Division. A second line battery, 2/1st Warwickshire RHA, also served on the Western Front in 1917 and 1918 as part of an Army Field Artillery Brigade. Post-war it was reconstituted as a Royal Field Artillery battery.

== History ==
=== Formation ===
The Territorial Force (TF) was formed on 1 April 1908 following the enactment of the Territorial and Reserve Forces Act 1907 (7 Edw.7, c.9) which combined and re-organised the old Volunteer Force, the Honourable Artillery Company and the Yeomanry. On formation, the TF contained 14 infantry divisions and 14 mounted yeomanry brigades. Each yeomanry brigade included a horse artillery battery and an ammunition column.

On 18 March 1908, Warwickshire Royal Horse Artillery (Territorial Force) was proposed as a new unit and it was recognized by the Army Council on 4 June 1908. The battery was raised by Lord Brooke at Warwick Castle. It consisted of

Battery HQ at Leamington
Warwickshire Battery at Leamington
1st South Midland Mounted Brigade Ammunition Column also at Leamington

The battery was equipped with four Ehrhardt 15-pounder guns and allocated as artillery support to the 1st South Midland Mounted Brigade. (Note: Frederick says Berkshire RHA was assigned to the 1st South Midland Mounted Brigade and Warwickshire RHA to the 2nd South Midland Mounted Brigade. However, as 1st South Midland Mounted Brigade included the Warwickshire Yeomanry and the 2nd South Midland Mounted Brigade include the Berkshire Yeomanry, this is probably an error.)

=== First World War ===
In accordance with the Territorial and Reserve Forces Act 1907 (7 Edw.7, c.9) which brought the Territorial Force into being, the TF was intended to be a home defence force for service during wartime and members could not be compelled to serve outside the country. However, on the outbreak of war on 4 August 1914, many members volunteered for Imperial Service. Therefore, TF units were split into 1st Line (liable for overseas service) and 2nd Line (home service for those unable or unwilling to serve overseas) units. 2nd Line units performed the home defence role, although in fact most of these were also posted abroad in due course.

==== 1/1st Warwickshire ====
The 1st Line battery was embodied with the 1st South Midland Mounted Brigade on 4 August 1914 at the outbreak of the First World War. Initially, the brigade moved to Diss, Norfolk and joined the 1st Mounted Division. Later in August, a concentration of mounted brigades was ordered to take place around the Churn area of Berkshire and the brigade moved to the racecourse at Newbury. These brigades were transferred to the new 2nd Mounted Division on 2 September. I Brigade RHA and II Brigade RHA (Note: The basic organic unit of the Royal Artillery was, and is, the Battery. When grouped together they formed brigades, in the same way that infantry battalions or cavalry regiments were grouped together in brigades. At the outbreak of the First World War, a field artillery brigade of headquarters (4 officers, 37 other ranks), three batteries (5 and 193 each), and a brigade ammunition column (4 and 154) had a total strength just under 800 so was broadly comparable to an infantry battalion (just over 1,000) or a cavalry regiment (about 550). Like an infantry battalion, an artillery brigade was usually commanded by a Lieutenant-Colonel. Artillery brigades were redesignated as regiments in 1938. Note that the battery strength refers to a battery of six guns; a four-gun battery would be about two thirds of this.) were formed for the division and the battery was assigned to I Brigade at Churn. (Note: II Brigade, RHA (T.F.) commanded Berkshire RHA, Nottinghamshire RHA and A Battery and B Battery, Honourable Artillery Company.)

At the end of October 1914, B Battery, Honourable Artillery Company replaced it in I Brigade and the Warwickshire Battery departed for France, landing at Le Havre on 1 November. It was therefore the first Territorial Force artillery unit to go overseas on active service. The 42nd (East Lancashire) Division had departed for Egypt from 10 September 1914, the 43rd (Wessex) Division for India on 9 October, and the 44th (Home Counties) Division also for India on 30 October, complete with their artillery batteries. However, these divisions were to act as garrison forces and neither Egypt nor India was a theatre of war at this time: on arrival in India, the units reverted to peace-time conditions and pushed on with training to prepare for field service, and Britain did not declare war on Turkey until 5 November 1914.

Warwickshire RHA was to spend the rest of the war on the Western Front. Initially held up by horse sickness, it was not until 4 December that the battery was attached to the 2nd Cavalry Division. On 14 April 1915 it joined VII Brigade RHA, 1st Cavalry Division and was assigned to 9th Cavalry Brigade While with 1st Cavalry Division, the division took part in the Second Battle of Ypres, notably the Battle of Frezenberg Ridge (9 – 13 May) and the Battle of Bellewaarde Ridge (24 May 1915), and the Battle of Flers–Courcelette (15 September 1916) as part of the Battle of the Somme.

On 23 August 1915, the battery was re-equipped, not with the expected 13 pounders but with four 18 pounders, normally employed by Royal Field Artillery batteries to support infantry. On 21 November 1916, the battery joined XV Brigade RHA, 29th Division in exchange for the regular Y Battery RHA.

Thereafter, the battery supported 29th Division in a large number of major actions. In 1917 this including the Battle of Arras (April to May, First, Second and Third Battles of the Scarpe), the Third Battle of Ypres (August to October, battles of Langemarck, Brodseinde and Poelcappelle) and the Battle of Cambrai (November and December, including the Tank Attack and the German Counter-attacks).

1918 likewise saw a number of major actions, including the Battle of the Lys (April, the battles of Estaires, Messines, Hazelbrouck and Bailleul), the Advance to Victory (August and September) and the Final Advance in Flanders (September and October, Fifth Battle of Ypres and Battle of Courtrai).

At the Armistice, it was still serving in XV Brigade RHA with 29th Division (equipped with six 18 pounders). The battery advanced into Germany on 4 December 1918. If later formed part of the British Army of the Rhine, and absorbed its 2nd line in Germany in 1919.

==== 2/1st Warwickshire ====
2/1st Warwickshire RHA (T.F.)
- Active: 1914 – 1919
- Country: United Kingdom
- Branch: British Army
- Type: Artillery
- Size: Battery
- Part of: 2/1st South Midland Mounted Brigade; CXXVI Brigade, RFA
- Equipment: Ordnance BLC 15-pounder Ordnance QF 18-pounder
- Engagements: First World War Western Front

Warwickshire RHA formed a 2nd line in 1914, initially designated as the Warwickshire (Reserve) Battery RHA and later given a fractional designation as 2/1st Warwickshire Battery, RHA.

The battery joined the 2nd line 2/1st South Midland Mounted Brigade when it was formed in April 1915. On 6 March 1915, the 2/2nd Mounted Division was formed to replace 2nd Mounted Division which had been warned for overseas service. The brigade joined the division on East Coast Defences in June 1915 and concentrated at Hunstanton with the battery at South Creake. (Note: 2/1st Nottinghamshire RHA, 2/1st Berkshire Royal Horse Artillery and 2/A Battery, HAC formed the other three batteries of the division.)

The batteries of the division were quite unready for war. Three had no horses, the fourth had just 23; three batteries had over 200 men on average, but the other just 91; one battery had no ammunition and another reported that its 15-pounders were "practically useless". The battery remained with the division when it was redesignated as 3rd Mounted Division in March 1916 and as 1st Mounted Division (Note: Not to be confused with the original 1st Mounted Division which became 1st Cyclist Division in July 1916.) in July 1916. It had left the division by November 1916.

Army Field Brigade

CXXVI Brigade, RFA was reformed (Note: The original CXXVI Brigade, RFA was formed from November 1914 as an 18 pounder gun brigade for the original 32nd Division in Kitchener's Fourth New Army. The divisions of the Fourth New Army were broken up on 10 April 1915 and the brigade was transferred to the 37th Division. It joined the division on 15 April as a 4.5" howitzer brigade and proceeded to France with the division at the end of July 1915. It served with the division on the Western Front until 28 January 1917 when it was broken up.) at Heytesbury, Wiltshire in May 1917 with 2/A Battery and 2/B Battery HAC, both with six 18 pounders. The brigade landed at Boulogne on 22 June 1917 and became an Army Field Brigade. (Note: Army Field Artillery Brigades were artillery brigades that were excess to the needs of the divisions, withdrawn to form an artillery reserve.) 2/1st Warwickshire, by now also rearmed with 18 pounders, proceeded to France on 21 June 1917, joined the brigade and served with it on the Western Front for the rest of the war.

At the Armistice, the battery (by now made up to six 18 pounders) was still with CXXVI Brigade, RFA serving as Army Troops with the First Army. The battery entered Germany after the war ended, and was amalgamated into its 1st line in 1919.

=== Post war ===
Warwickshire RHA was not reconstituted until 7 February 1920 when it formed 3rd Warwickshire Battery, RFA (later numbered 271st Battery) in 3rd South Midland Brigade, RFA, (later 68th (South Midland) Field Regiment, Royal Artillery). and ceased to be a Royal Horse Artillery battery.

== See also ==
- List of Territorial Force horse artillery batteries 1908

== Bibliography ==
- Becke, Archibald F. (1935). Order of Battle of Divisions Part 1–The Regular British Divisions. London: HMSO. OCLC 4405016.
- Becke, Archibald F. (1936). Order of Battle of Divisions Part 2A. The Territorial Force Mounted Divisions and the 1st-Line Territorial Force Divisions (42–56). London: HMSO. OCLC 4405016.
- Becke, Archibald F. (1945). Order of Battle of Divisions Part 3B. New Army Divisions (30-41) & 63rd (R.N.) Division. London: HMSO. OCLC 4405016.
- Clarke, Dale (2004). British Artillery 1914–19 Field Army Artillery. Vol. 94 of New Vanguard Series. Oxford: Osprey Publishing. ISBN 1-84176-688-7.
- Frederick, J.B.M. (1984). Lineage Book of British Land Forces 1660–1978. Wakefield, Yorkshire: Microform Academic Publishers. ISBN 1-85117-009-X.
- James, Brigadier E.A. (1978). British Regiments 1914–18. London: Samson Books Limited. ISBN 0-906304-03-2.
- Rinaldi, Richard A (2008). Order of Battle of the British Army 1914. Ravi Rikhye. ISBN 978-0-97760728-0.
- Westlake, Ray (1992). British Territorial Units 1914–18. Osprey Publishing. ISBN 978-1-85532-168-7.
- Order of Battle of the British Armies in France, November 11th, 1918. France: General Staff, GHQ. 1918.
