= I Brigade, Royal Horse Artillery (T.F.) =

Former horse artillery brigade of the British Army

- Active: 2 September 1914 – 21 January 1916
- Country: United Kingdom
- Branch: British Army
- Type: Artillery
- Size: Battalion
- Part of: 2nd Mounted Division
- Equipment: Ordnance QF 15-pounder
- Engagements: World War I

I Brigade, Royal Horse Artillery (Territorial Force), along with its sister II Brigade, Royal Horse Artillery (T.F.), was a horse artillery brigade (Note: The basic organic unit of the Royal Artillery was, and is, the Battery. When grouped together they formed brigades, in the same way that infantry battalions or cavalry regiments were grouped together in brigades. At the outbreak of World War I, a field artillery brigade of headquarters (4 officers, 37 other ranks), three batteries (5 and 193 each), and a brigade ammunition column (4 and 154) had a total strength just under 800 so was broadly comparable to an infantry battalion (just over 1,000) or a cavalry regiment (about 550). Like an infantry battalion, an artillery brigade was usually commanded by a Lieutenant-Colonel. Artillery brigades were redesignated as regiments in 1938. The battery strength refers to a battery of six guns; a four-gun battery would be about two thirds of this.) of the Territorial Force that was formed in September 1914 for the 2nd Mounted Division at the start of World War I.

The brigade moved to Egypt with the division in April 1915 and remained there when the bulk of the division went to Gallipoli in August 1915. It was once more part of the 2nd Mounted Division from December 1915 but was broken up in January 1916 when the division was dissolved.

== History ==
=== Formation ===
A decision was made to form a new mounted division from the mounted brigades in and around the Churn area of Berkshire. On 2 September 1914, 2nd Mounted Division, with Headquarters at Goring, came into being with three mounted brigades transferred from 1st Mounted Division (1st South Midland Mounted Brigade at Newbury, 2nd South Midland Mounted Brigade at Churn and the Nottinghamshire and Derbyshire Mounted Brigade at South Stoke) and the London Mounted Brigade at Streatley. The brigades were relatively widely dispersed to allow an adequate water supply for the horses and to provide sufficient training areas.

Each of the four mounted brigades include a horse artillery battery of four Ehrhardt 15-pounder guns. On 2 September 1914, I Brigade RHA (T.F.) was formed at Churn with Warwickshire Battery, RHA, late of the 1st South Midland Mounted Brigade. On the same date, II Brigade RHA (T.F.) was also formed at Churn with Berkshire and Nottinghamshire Batteries, RHA and A and B Batteries, HAC.

=== Active service ===
On 1 November, Warwickshire Battery was posted to France: the first Territorial Force artillery battery to go on active service. It was replaced in the brigade by B Battery, HAC from II Brigade, RHA (T.F.).

In November 1914, the division moved to Norfolk on coastal defence duties. Artillery headquarters was established at Cromer, before joining the divisional headquarters at Hanworth in December, and the battery was at Gayton (1st South Midland Mounted Brigade was at King's Lynn).

In March 1915, the division was put on warning for overseas service. In early April, the division starting leaving Avonmouth and the last elements landed at Alexandria before the end of the month. By the middle of May, the horse artillery batteries were near Ismaïlia on Suez Canal Defences. On 14 July 1915, B Battery, HAC (along with Berkshire, RHA of II Brigade) left for Aden. They fought a sharp action at Sheikh Othman on 20 July, that removed the Turkish threat to Aden for the rest of the war, before returning to Egypt.

On 10 August 1915, the division was reorganized as a dismounted formation in preparation for service at Gallipoli. Each Yeomanry Regiment left a squadron headquarters and two troops (about 100 officers and men) in Egypt to look after the horses. The artillery batteries and ammunition columns, signal troops, mobile veterinary sections, Mounted Brigade Transport and Supply Columns and two of the Field Ambulances were also left behind in Egypt.

The 2nd Mounted Division returned from Gallipoli in December 1915 and was reformed and remounted. On 13 December 1915, B Battery, HAC rejoined the brigade from Suez Canal Defences and on 20 December 1915, A Battery, HAC joined from II Brigade. However, the dismemberment of the division began almost immediately as units were posted to the Western Frontier Force or to various other commands. On 21 January 1916, A and B Batteries, HAC left to join the Suez Canal Defences and the brigade HQ was disbanded; 2nd Mounted Division was disbanded on the same day.

== Bibliography ==
- Becke, Major A.F. (1936). Order of Battle of Divisions Part 2A. The Territorial Force Mounted Divisions and the 1st-Line Territorial Force Divisions (42–56). London: His Majesty's Stationery Office. OCLC 493146712.
- Clarke, Dale (2004). British Artillery 1914–19 Field Army Artillery. Volume 94 of New Vanguard Series. Oxford: Osprey Publishing. ISBN 1-84176-688-7.
- Farndale, General Sir Martin (1988). The Forgotten Fronts and the Home Base, 1914–18. History of the Royal Regiment of Artillery. Woolwich: The Royal Artillery Institution. ISBN 1-870114-05-1.
- Frederick, J.B.M. (1984). Lineage Book of British Land Forces 1660–1978. Wakefield, Yorkshire: Microform Academic Publishers. ISBN 1-85117-009-X.
- James, Brigadier E.A. (1978). British Regiments 1914–18. London: Samson Books Limited. ISBN 0-906304-03-2.
- Rinaldi, Richard A (2008). Order of Battle of the British Army 1914. Ravi Rikhye. ISBN 978-0-97760728-0.
- Westlake, Ray (1992). British Territorial Units 1914–18. Osprey Publishing. ISBN 978-1-85532-168-7.
