= A Battery, Honourable Artillery Company =

British Army airborne artillery battery

A Battery (1st City of London Horse Artillery), Honourable Artillery Company
- Active: 1891 – 16 February 1920; 2018 – present
- Country: United Kingdom
- Branch: British Army
- Type: Artillery
- Size: Battery
- Part of: London Mounted Brigade; 16 Air Assault Brigade
- Garrison/HQ: Armoury House, Finsbury
- Drop Zone Flash
- Equipment: Ordnance QF 15-pounder Ordnance QF 18-pounder Ordnance QF 13-pounder L118 Light Gun
- Engagements: First World War Senussi Campaign Sinai and Palestine Campaign First Battle of Gaza Second Battle of Gaza Third Battle of Gaza Battle of Beersheba (1917) Battle of Mughar Ridge Battle of Jerusalem Second Trans-Jordan Raid Capture of Damascus (1918)

A (1st City of London) Battery, Honourable Artillery Company is a L118 light gun battery that provides a reserve to 7th Parachute Regiment Royal Horse Artillery. Its predecessor was a horse artillery battery that was formed from Light Cavalry Squadron, HAC, in 1891. It transferred to the Territorial Force in 1908 as artillery support for the London Mounted Brigade.

During the First World War it was posted to Egypt in 1915, served as part of the Western Frontier Force in the Senussi Campaign in 1916 and in the Sinai and Palestine Campaign with the Imperial (later Australian) Mounted Division in 1917 and 1918. The second line battery – 2/A Battery, HAC – was formed in 1914 and served on the Western Front in 1917 and 1918 as part of an Army Field Artillery Brigade; the third line – A (Reserve) Battery, HAC – was formed in 1915 to provide trained replacements for the 1st and 2nd Line batteries.

Post-war, the battery, along with B Battery, Honourable Artillery Company, was amalgamated with the City of London Yeomanry (Rough Riders) to form the 11th (Honourable Artillery Company and City of London Yeomanry) Brigade, RHA.

In 2018 the battery was reformed as A (1st City of London) Battery, Honourable Artillery Company in support of 7th Parachute Regiment Royal Horse Artillery.

== History ==
=== Formation ===
The Honourable Artillery Company (HAC) first raised horse artillery in 1860 when Jay's Troop, HAC was formed. This had a brief existence, being disbanded in 1869.

In 1891, the Light Cavalry Squadron, HAC was converted to the Horse Battery, HAC, which in 1899 was redesignated as A Battery (1st City of London Horse Artillery), HAC. At the same time the Field Battery, HAC was converted to horse artillery as B Battery (2nd City of London Horse Artillery), HAC. The Field Battery originated in 1781, but was the second to form a horse artillery battery hence the junior designation.

The batteries sponsored the field battery of the City Imperial Volunteers for service in the Second Boer War in 1900–02.

=== Territorial Force ===
The Territorial Force (TF) was formed on 1 April 1908 following the enactment of the Territorial and Reserve Forces Act 1907 (7 Edw.7, c.9) which combined and re-organised the old Volunteer Force, the Honourable Artillery Company and the Yeomanry. On formation, the TF contained 14 infantry divisions and 14 mounted yeomanry brigades. Each yeomanry brigade included a horse artillery battery and an ammunition column. 12 of these were provided by Royal Horse Artillery batteries of the Territorial Force, the other two by the Honourable Artillery Company.

On 1 April 1908, the battery transferred to the Territorial Force without a change in title. The unit consisted of the battery and London Mounted Brigade Ammunition Column at Armoury House, Finsbury. The battery was equipped with four Ehrhardt 15-pounder guns and allocated as artillery support to the London Mounted Brigade.

=== First World War ===
In accordance with the Territorial and Reserve Forces Act 1907 (7 Edw.7, c.9) which brought the Territorial Force into being, the TF was intended to be a home defence force for service during wartime and members could not be compelled to serve outside the country. However, on the outbreak of war on 4 August 1914, many members volunteered for Imperial Service. Therefore, TF units were split into 1st Line (liable for overseas service) and 2nd Line (home service for those unable or unwilling to serve overseas) units. 2nd Line units performed the home defence role, although in fact most of these were also posted abroad in due course. Later, a 3rd Line was formed to act as a reserve, providing trained replacements for the 1st and 2nd Line batteries.

==== 1/A Battery, HAC ====
The 1st Line battery was embodied with the London Mounted Brigade on 4 August 1914 at the outbreak of the First World War and concentrated in Berkshire. A decision was made to form a new mounted division from the mounted brigades in and around the Churn area of Berkshire. On 2 September 1914, 2nd Mounted Division, with Headquarters at Goring, came into being and London Mounted Brigade was assigned to the new division. I Brigade and II Brigade, RHA (T.F.) (Note: The basic organic unit of the Royal Artillery was, and is, the Battery. When grouped together they formed brigades, in the same way that infantry battalions or cavalry regiments were grouped together in brigades. At the outbreak of the First World War, a field artillery brigade of headquarters (4 officers, 37 other ranks), three batteries (5 and 193 each), and a brigade ammunition column (4 and 154) had a total strength just under 800 so was broadly comparable to an infantry battalion (just over 1,000) or a cavalry regiment (about 550). Like an infantry battalion, an artillery brigade was usually commanded by a Lieutenant-Colonel. Artillery brigades were redesignated as regiments in 1938. Note that the battery strength refers to a battery of six guns; a four-gun battery would be about two thirds of this.) were formed for the division and the battery was assigned to II Brigade, RHA at Churn, along with B Battery, HAC and Berkshire and Nottinghamshire Batteries RHA.

In November 1914, the division moved to Norfolk on coastal defence duties. Artillery headquarters was established at Cromer, before joining the divisional headquarters at Hanworth in December, and A Battery, HAC was at Mundesley (London Mounted Brigade was at Hanworth).

Overseas service

In March 1915, the 2nd Mounted Division was put on warning for overseas service. In early April, the division starting leaving Avonmouth and the last elements landed at Alexandria before the end of the month. By the middle of May, the horse artillery batteries were near Ismaïlia on Suez Canal Defences.

The 2nd Mounted Division was dismounted in August 1915 and served at Gallipoli. The artillery batteries and ammunition columns (along with the signal troops, mobile veterinary sections, Mounted Brigade Transport and Supply Columns and two of the Field Ambulances) were left behind in Egypt. The division returned from Gallipoli in December 1915 and was reformed and remounted.

The battery rejoined the division on 13 December, but on 20 December it entrained at Alexandria for the Western Desert, concentrating at Mersa Matruh on 7 January 1916. Thereafter, it served as part of the Western Frontier Force in the Senussi Campaign, taking part in the Affair at Halazin (23 January 1916). The battery returned to Alexandria on 6 March and was rearmed with four 18 pounders. It returned to the Suez Canal Defences on 6 April and rejoined the 8th Mounted Brigade (the redesignated London Mounted Brigade). The brigade left for Salonika in November without the battery which joined the Australian 4th Light Horse Brigade when it was reformed in February 1917. It remained attached to the 4th ALH Brigade for the rest of the war.

Imperial Mounted Division

The Imperial Mounted Division was formed in Egypt in January 1917; 4th Light Horse Brigade was one of the four cavalry brigades selected to form the division. A Battery, HAC joined the division on formation and was assigned to XIX Brigade, Royal Horse Artillery (T.F.). (Note: The other three batteries were Berkshire RHA, Nottinghamshire RHA, and B Battery, HAC. All four batteries were originally part of the 2nd Mounted Division.) In practice, the battery remained attached to 4th ALH Brigade.

The battery, and its brigade, served with the Imperial Mounted Division in the Sinai and Palestine Campaign as part of the Desert Column. With the division, it took part in the advance across the Sinai, including the First (26 – 27 March 1917) and Second Battles of Gaza (17 – 19 April 1917).

Australian Mounted Division

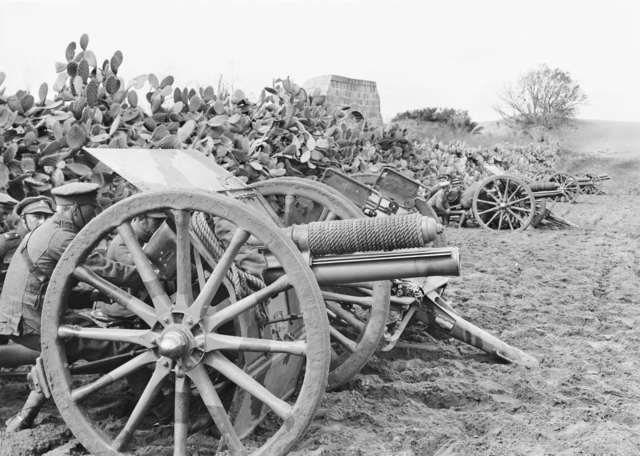
Gunners of A Battery, Honourable Artillery Company, attached to the Australian 4th Light Horse Brigade, crouch between their 13 pounder quick fire field guns and a cactus hedge near Belah, Palestine, in March 1918.

In June 1917, the Desert Column was reorganised from two mounted divisions of four brigades each (ANZAC and Imperial Mounted Divisions) to three mounted divisions of three brigades each (ANZAC, Australian – Imperial Mounted Division renamed – and the new Yeomanry Mounted Division). On 20 June 1917, the Imperial Mounted Division was redesignated as Australian Mounted Division as the majority of its troops were now Australian. On 12 August 1917, the Desert Column disappeared and the Desert Mounted Corps was formed.

The battery served with the Australian Mounted Division throughout the rest of the Sinai and Palestine Campaign. As part of the Desert Mounted Corps, the division took part in the Third Battle of Gaza (by now re-equipped with four 13 pounders), in particular the Capture of Beersheba (31 October) and the Battle of Mughar Ridge (13 and 14 November), and the defence of Jerusalem against the Turkish counter-attacks (27 November – 3 December).

Still part of the Desert Mounted Corps, the division took part in the Second Trans-Jordan Raid (30 April – 4 May 1918). XIX Brigade, RHA supported the 4th Light Horse Brigade in the advance on the Jisr ed Damiye–Es Salt track on 30 April. The next day, a strong Turkish force attacked from the direction of Jisr ed Damiye and soon the artillery was in danger. B Battery, HAC was in the rear and managed to get away with all but one of their guns (stuck in a wadi) but the Nottinghamshire RHA and A Battery, HAC were less fortunate. Machine gun fire cut down the horse teams before the guns could be gotten away. XIX Brigade lost 9 guns in total, the only guns to be lost in action in the entire campaign.

Its final action was the capture of Damascus (1 October).

After the Armistice of Mudros, the division was withdrawn to Egypt and started to demobilise. The last of the Australians returned home in April and May 1919. A Battery, HAC were reduced to cadre in Egypt on 25 October 1919.

==== 2/A Battery, HAC ====
2/A Battery, Honourable Artillery Company
- Active: September 1914 – 1919
- Country: United Kingdom
- Branch: British Army
- Type: Artillery
- Size: Battery
- Part of: 2/1st London Mounted Brigade; CXXVI Brigade, RFA
- Equipment: Ordnance BL 15 pounder Ordnance BLC 15-pounder Ordnance QF 18-pounder
- Engagements: First World War Western Front

A Battery formed a 2nd line in September 1914, initially designated as the A (Reserve) Battery, HAC. It was redesignated as 2/A Battery, HAC on 26 September.

The battery joined the 2nd line 2/1st London Mounted Brigade when it was formed in March 1915. On 6 March 1915, the 2/2nd Mounted Division was formed to replace 2nd Mounted Division which had been warned for overseas service. The brigade joined the division on East Coast Defences by June 1915 and concentrated at Aylsham with the battery at Reepham. (Note: 2/1st Nottinghamshire, 2/1st Warwickshire and 2/1st Berkshire RHA formed the other three batteries of the division.)

The batteries of the division were quite unready for war. Three had no horses, the fourth had just 23; three batteries had over 200 men on average, but the other just 91; one battery had no ammunition and another reported that its 15-pounders were "practically useless".

In November 1915, the battery received four Ordnance BLC 15-pounders. It remained with the division when it was redesignated as 3rd Mounted Division in March 1916 and as 1st Mounted Division (Note: Not to be confused with the original 1st Mounted Division which became 1st Cyclist Division, also in July 1916.) in July 1916. In early 1917, the battery was armed with four 18 pounders.

Army Field Brigade

CXXVI Brigade, RFA was reformed (Note: The original CXXVI Brigade, RFA was formed from November 1914 as an 18 pounder gun brigade for the original 32nd Division in Kitchener's Fourth New Army. The divisions of the Fourth New Army were broken up on 10 April 1915 and the brigade was transferred to the 37th Division. It joined the division on 15 April as a 4.5" howitzer brigade and proceeded to France with the division at the end of July 1915. It served with the division on the Western Front until 28 January 1917 when it was broken up.) at Heytesbury, Wiltshire in May 1917 with 2/A Battery and 2/B Battery HAC, both with six 18 pounders. The brigade (with the battery) landed at Boulogne on 22 June 1917 and it became an Army Field Brigade. (Note: Army Field Artillery Brigades were artillery brigades that were excess to the needs of the divisions, withdrawn to form an artillery reserve.) 2/1st Warwickshire RHA, by now also rearmed with 18 pounders, proceeded to France on 21 June 1917 and joined the brigade there. The battery served on the Western Front for the rest of the war.

At the Armistice, the battery (six 18 pounders) was still with CXXVI Brigade, RFA serving as Army Troops with the First Army. The battery entered Germany on 17 January 1919, and was disbanded later the same year.

==== A (Reserve) Battery, HAC ====
A (Reserve) Battery, HAC was formed in 1915 to replace the original reserve battery which had been redesignated as 2/A Battery on 26 September 1914. It never left the United Kingdom and was disbanded later.

=== Post war ===
On 7 February 1920, the Honourable Artillery Company was authorized to reconstitute four batteries of horse artillery in the Territorial Force. Only two were actually formed (A and B Batteries), and authorization for the other two was rescinded in 1921. The batteries were amalgamated with the City of London Yeomanry (Rough Riders) on 16 February to form the 11th (Honourable Artillery Company and City of London Yeomanry) Brigade, RHA with

- Headquarters at Finsbury Barracks
- A Battery at Armoury House, Finsbury
- B Battery at Armoury House, Finsbury
- C Battery at Bunhill Row, formed by reduction of the City of London Yeomanry.

=== 21st Century ===
A (1st City of London) Battery, HAC

In 2018 the battery was reformed as A (1st City of London) Battery, Honourable Artillery Company, equipped with the L118 Light Gun in support of 7th Parachute Regiment Royal Horse Artillery. Under the Future Soldier Programme, the Battery's role was further refined to provide guns 7 & 8 to each of 7RHA's three light gun batteries.

From 5 May 2026 A Battery adopted the Airborne Forces maroon beret.

In 2026 Lance Corporal Grace Cussons of the HAC became first female reservist to pass All Arms Pre-Parachute Selection.

== See also ==
- List of Territorial Force horse artillery batteries 1908

== Bibliography ==
- Becke, Archibald F. (1936). Order of Battle of Divisions Part 2A. The Territorial Force Mounted Divisions and the 1st-Line Territorial Force Divisions (42–56). London: HMSO. OCLC 4405016.
- Becke, Archibald F. (1945). Order of Battle of Divisions Part 3B. New Army Divisions (30-41) & 63rd (R.N.) Division. London: HMSO. OCLC 4405016.
- Clarke, Dale (2004). British Artillery 1914–19 Field Army Artillery. Vol. 94 of New Vanguard Series. Oxford: Osprey Publishing. ISBN 1-84176-688-7.
- Farndale, General Sir Martin (1988). The Forgotten Fronts and the Home Base, 1914–18. History of the Royal Regiment of Artillery. Woolwich: The Royal Artillery Institution. ISBN 1-870114-05-1.
- Frederick, J.B.M. (1984). Lineage Book of British Land Forces 1660–1978. Wakefield, Yorkshire: Microform Academic Publishers. ISBN 1-85117-009-X.
- James, Brigadier E.A. (1978). British Regiments 1914–18. London: Samson Books Limited. ISBN 0-906304-03-2.
- Perry, F.W. (1992). Order of Battle of Divisions Part 5A. The Divisions of Australia, Canada and New Zealand and those in East Africa. Newport: Ray Westlake Military Books. ISBN 1-871167-25-6.
- Rinaldi, Richard A (2008). Order of Battle of the British Army 1914. Ravi Rikhye. ISBN 978-0-97760728-0.
- Westlake, Ray (1992). British Territorial Units 1914–18. Osprey Publishing. ISBN 978-1-85532-168-7.
- Order of Battle of the British Armies in France, November 11th, 1918. France: General Staff, GHQ. 1918.
