= Derbyshire Yeomanry =

- Cap badge of The Derbyshire Yeomanry
- Active: 22 October 1794 – 2 February 1957
- Country: Kingdom of Great Britain (1794–1800); United Kingdom (1801–1957)
- Branch: British Army
- Type: Yeomanry
- Size: Regiment
- Engagements: South Africa 1900–01; World War I Gallipoli 1915 Egypt 1915–16 Macedonia 1916–18 World War II North Africa 1942–43 Italy 1944–45 North-West Europe 1944–45

The Derbyshire Yeomanry was a yeomanry regiment of the British Army, first raised in 1794, which served as a cavalry regiment and dismounted infantry regiment in the First World War and provided two reconnaissance regiments in the Second World War, before being amalgamated with the Leicestershire Yeomanry to form the Leicestershire and Derbyshire (Prince Albert's Own) Yeomanry in 1957.

== History ==
=== Formation and early history ===
The regiment was first formed as the Derbyshire Corps of Fencible Cavalry in 1794, as a regiment of full-time fencible soldiers for home defence. The regiment changed shortly thereafter to the Derbyshire Corps of Yeomanry Cavalry, a part-time yeomanry regiment, and was dispersed in individual troops. In 1834, the troops were regimented as the Derbyshire Yeomanry Cavalry, who sponsored the 8th and 104th (Derbyshire) Companies of the Imperial Yeomanry in 1900, for service in the South African War, and in 1901 was itself reorganized as mounted infantry as the Derbyshire Imperial Yeomanry. In 1908, it was transferred into the Territorial Force, returning to a cavalry role and equipping as dragoons, under the new title of The Derbyshire Yeomanry. The regiment was based at Siddals Road in Derby at this time (since demolished).

=== First World War ===
In accordance with the Territorial and Reserve Forces Act 1907 (7 Edw. 7, c.9) which brought the Territorial Force into being, the TF was intended to be a home defence force for service during wartime and members could not be compelled to serve outside the country. However, on the outbreak of war on 4 August 1914, many members volunteered for Imperial Service. Therefore, TF units were split in August and September 1914 into 1st Line (liable for overseas service) and 2nd Line (home service for those unable or unwilling to serve overseas) units. Later, a 3rd Line was formed to act as a reserve, providing trained replacements for the 1st and 2nd Line regiments.

==== 1/1st Derbyshire Yeomanry ====
The regiment mobilised in August 1914 as part of the Nottinghamshire and Derbyshire Mounted Brigade, but remained in England until 1915, when it moved to Egypt with the 7th Mounted Brigade, 2nd Mounted Division. It then sailed for Gallipoli, where it saw action at the Battle of Scimitar Hill, serving as dismounted infantry, and took heavy losses. Returning to Egypt in December, the regiment was employed with the Western Frontier Force in the Senussi Campaign, before moving to Salonika in February 1916. One squadron served with the 27th Division from March to June 1916, whilst the regiment remained as GHQ reserve in Macedonia until the end of the war.

==== 2/1st Derbyshire Yeomanry ====
The 2nd Line regiment was formed in 1914. In February 1915, it was at Chatsworth and joined the 2/1st Nottinghamshire and Derbyshire Mounted Brigade. By June, the brigade was in the 2/2nd Mounted Division in the King's Lynn area. On 31 March 1916, the remaining Mounted Brigades were ordered to be numbered in a single sequence and the brigade became the 9th Mounted Brigade (and the division 3rd Mounted Division).

In July 1916, there was a major reorganization of 2nd Line yeomanry units in the United Kingdom. All but 12 regiments were converted to cyclists and as a consequence the regiment was dismounted; the brigade was redesignated as the 9th Cyclist Brigade and the division as the 1st Cyclist Division. The regiment was in the Canterbury area and was still there (at Bridge) when the brigade was renumbered as the 5th Cyclist Brigade in November 1916. The regiment remained near Canterbury in 1917 and the brigade was an independent formation from September to December 1917. During 1918, the regiment was at Ash (near Canterbury), still in the 5th Cyclist Brigade but now in The Cyclist Division.

Some 165 men and four officers from the regiment were drafted to France to reinforce the 14th Battalion, Durham Light Infantry in October 1916.

==== 3/1st Derbyshire Yeomanry ====
The 3rd Line regiment was formed in 1915. That summer, it was affiliated a Reserve Cavalry Regiment at Aldershot. In April 1916, it was affiliated to the 14th Reserve Cavalry Regiment, also at Aldershot. In the autumn of 1916, it moved to Ireland with the 14th Reserve Cavalry Regiment and in February 1917 it was absorbed into the 4th Reserve Cavalry Regiment back at Aldershot.

=== Between the wars ===
On 7 February 1920, the regiment was reconstituted in the Territorial Army with HQ still at Derby. Following the experience of the war, it was decided that only the fourteen most senior yeomanry regiments would be retained as horsed cavalry, with the rest being transferred to other roles. As a result, on 14 July 1921, the regiment was converted and reduced to 24th (Derbyshire Yeomanry) Armoured Car Company, Tank Corps, one of eight (Note: The eight yeomanry regiments converted to Armoured Car Companies of the Royal Tank Corps (RTC) were: 19th (Lothians and Border) Armoured Car Company, Royal Tank Corps from Lothians and Border Horse; 20th (Fife and Forfar) Armoured Car Company, Royal Tank Corps from Fife and Forfar Yeomanry; 21st (Gloucestershire Yeomanry) Armoured Car Company, Royal Tank Corps from Royal Gloucestershire Hussars; 22nd (London) Armoured Car Company (Westminster Dragoons), Royal Tank Corps from Westminster Dragoons; 23rd (London) Armoured Car Company, Royal Tank Corps from 3rd County of London Yeomanry (Sharpshooters); 24th (Derbyshire Yeomanry) Armoured Car Company, Royal Tank Corps from Derbyshire Yeomanry; 25th (Northamptonshire Yeomanry) Armoured Car Company, Royal Tank Corps from Northamptonshire Yeomanry; 26th (East Riding of York Yeomanry) Armoured Car Company, Royal Tank Corps from East Riding Yeomanry) regiments converted and reduced. In October 1923, it was redesignated as 24th (Derbyshire Yeomanry) Armoured Car Company, Royal Tank Corps and on 30 April 1939 it was transferred to the Royal Armoured Corps.

By 1939, it had become clear that a new European war was likely to break out, and the doubling of the Territorial Army was authorised, with each unit forming a duplicate. The Derbyshire Yeomanry was expanded to a regiment and, on 24 August 1939, regained its original title as the 1st Derbyshire Yeomanry. Also in August, it formed a duplicate 2nd Derbyshire Yeomanry regiment.

=== Second World War ===
==== 1st Derbyshire Yeomanry ====
The 1st Derbyshire Yeomanry landed in Tunisia in late 1942 as the reconnaissance regiment of the 6th Armoured Division, fighting at Medjez el Bab. During the race to the Tunisian coast, it fought at the Kasserine Pass and Foundouk, finally reaching Tunis in March 1943. The 1st Derbyshire then moved to Italy with the 6th Armoured Division, where it saw heavy fighting during May 1944, including action at the Battle of Monte Cassino. Through July and August, it fought in the advance to Florence, and in April 1945 saw action at the Argenta Gap and Fossa Cembalina.

==== 2nd Derbyshire Yeomanry ====
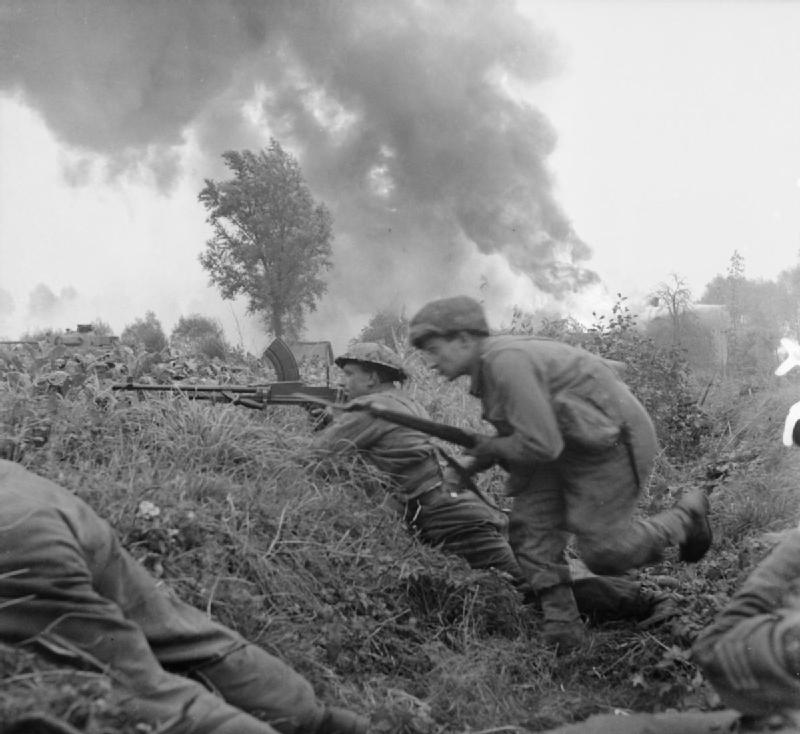
Troops of the 2nd Derbyshire Yeomanry take cover in a ditch during an attack on St Michielsgestel, 24 October 1944.

In 1942, the 2nd Derbyshire Yeomanry fought in North Africa at the Battle of Alam el Halfa and the Second Battle of El Alamein (as part of the 7th Armoured Division). Returning to the United Kingdom in late 1943, the 2nd was assigned to the 51st (Highland) Infantry Division, where it served as the divisional reconnaissance regiment until the end of the war. It received battle honours for actions in August, fighting at the Dives Crossing, La Vie Crossing and Lisieux during the crossing of the Seine; in September and October, it received honours for fighting on the Lower Maas, and in January 1945 for fighting at Ourthe during the Battle of the Bulge. The regiment received battle honours for fighting in the Rhineland and the Reichswald in February, and crossed the Rhine in March in Operation Plunder.

=== Post war ===
The Derbyshire Yeomanry was reconstituted in the Territorial Army on 1 January 1947. Its Headquarters remained at Derby and it commanded three squadrons. On 9 February 1957, it was amalgamated with The Leicestershire Yeomanry (Prince Albert's Own) to form The Leicestershire and Derbyshire (Prince Albert's Own) Yeomanry.

== Regimental museum ==
The Derby Museum and Art Gallery incorporates the Soldier's Story Gallery, based on the collections, inter alia, of the Derbyshire Yeomanry.

== Battle honours ==
The Derbyshire Yeomanry was awarded the following battle honours:

Second Boer War

South Africa 1900–01

World War I

Struma, Macedonia 1916–18, Suvla, Scimitar Hill, Gallipoli 1915, Egypt 1915–16

World War II

Dives Crossing, La Vie Crossing, Lisieux, Lower Maas, Ourthe, Rhineland, Reichswald, North-West Europe 1944–45, Alam El Halfa, El Alamein, Medjez el Bab, Tabourba Gap, Bou Arada, Kasserine, Steamroller Farm, Maknassy, Fondouk, Kairouan, El Kourzai, Tunis, North Africa 1942–43, Cassino II, Liri Valley, Aquino, Arezzo, Advance to Florence, Argenta Gap, Fossa Cembalina, Italy 1944–45

== See also ==
- Imperial Yeomanry
- List of Yeomanry Regiments 1908
- Yeomanry
- Yeomanry order of precedence
- British yeomanry during the First World War
- Second line yeomanry regiments of the British Army

== Bibliography ==
- Bellis, Malcolm A. (1994). Regiments of the British Army 1939–1945 (Armour & Infantry). London: Military Press International. ISBN 0-85420-999-9.
- James, Brigadier E.A. (1978). British Regiments 1914–18. London: Samson Books Limited. ISBN 0-906304-03-2.
- Mileham, Patrick (1994). The Yeomanry Regiments; 200 Years of Tradition. Edinburgh: Canongate Academic. ISBN 1-898410-36-4.
- Rinaldi, Richard A (2008). Order of Battle of the British Army 1914. Ravi Rikhye. ISBN 978-0-97760728-0.
