= Nottinghamshire Royal Horse Artillery =

Former British Army horse artillery battery

Nottinghamshire Royal Horse Artillery (T.F.) 1/1st Nottinghamshire RHA (T.F.)
- Active: 31 July 1908 – 7 February 1920
- Country: United Kingdom
- Branch: British Army
- Type: Artillery
- Size: Battery
- Part of: Nottinghamshire and Derbyshire Mounted Brigade
- peacetime HQ: Nottingham
- Equipment: Ordnance QF 15-pounder Ordnance QF 18-pounder Ordnance QF 13-pounder
- Engagements: First World War Senussi Campaign Action at Agagiya Sinai and Palestine Campaign First Battle of Gaza Second Battle of Gaza Third Battle of Gaza Battle of Beersheba (1917) Battle of Mughar Ridge Battle of Jerusalem Second Trans-Jordan Raid Battle of Megiddo (1918) Capture of Damascus (1918) Battle of Aleppo (1918)

Commanders
- Notable commanders: Major Joe Laycock

The Nottinghamshire Royal Horse Artillery was a Territorial Force Royal Horse Artillery battery that was formed in Nottinghamshire in 1908. It saw active service during the First World War in the Middle East – in the Senussi Campaign and the Sinai and Palestine Campaign – from 1915 to 1918. A second line battery, 2/1st Nottinghamshire RHA, served in the Mesopotamian Campaign in 1917 and 1918 as a Field Artillery battery. Post-war, it was reconstituted as a Royal Field Artillery battery.

== History ==
=== Formation ===
The Territorial Force (TF) was formed on 1 April 1908 following the enactment of the Territorial and Reserve Forces Act 1907 (7 Edw.7, c.9) which combined and re-organised the old Volunteer Force, the Honourable Artillery Company and the Yeomanry. On formation, the TF contained 14 infantry divisions and 14 mounted yeomanry brigades. Each yeomanry brigade included a horse artillery battery and an ammunition column.

On 18 March 1908, the Nottinghamshire Royal Horse Artillery (Territorial Force) was proposed as a new unit and it was recognized by the Army Council on 31 July 1908 (and the ammunition column on the same date). The unit consisted of

Battery HQ at Nottingham
Nottinghamshire Battery at Nottingham
Nottinghamshire and Derbyshire Mounted Brigade Ammunition Column also at Nottingham

The unit was equipped with four Ehrhardt 15-pounder guns and allocated as artillery support to the Nottinghamshire and Derbyshire Mounted Brigade. The battery was raised and trained by Major Joe Laycock.

=== First World War ===
In accordance with the Territorial and Reserve Forces Act 1907 (7 Edw.7, c.9) which brought the Territorial Force into being, the TF was intended to be a home defence force for service during wartime and members could not be compelled to serve outside the country. However, on the outbreak of war on 4 August 1914, many members volunteered for Imperial Service. Therefore, TF units were split into 1st Line (liable for overseas service) and 2nd Line (home service for those unable or unwilling to serve overseas) units. 2nd Line units performed the home defence role, although in fact most of these were also posted abroad in due course.

==== 1/1st Nottinghamshire ====
The 1st Line battery was embodied with the Nottinghamshire and Derbyshire Mounted Brigade on 4 August 1914 at the outbreak of the First World War. Initially, the brigade concentrated in Berkshire and on 5 August 1914 was assigned to the 1st Mounted Division. A decision was made to form a new mounted division from the mounted brigades in and around the Churn area of Berkshire. On 2 September 1914, 2nd Mounted Division, with Headquarters at Goring, came into being and the Nottinghamshire and Derbyshire Mounted Brigade was transferred to the new division. I Brigade and II Brigade, RHA (T.F.) (Note: The basic organic unit of the Royal Artillery was, and is, the Battery. When grouped together they formed brigades, in the same way that infantry battalions or cavalry regiments were grouped together in brigades. At the outbreak of the First World War, a field artillery brigade of headquarters (4 officers, 37 other ranks), three batteries (5 and 193 each), and a brigade ammunition column (4 and 154) had a total strength just under 800 so was broadly comparable to an infantry battalion (just over 1,000) or a cavalry regiment (about 550). Like an infantry battalion, an artillery brigade was usually commanded by a Lieutenant-Colonel. Artillery brigades were redesignated as regiments in 1938. Note that the battery strength refers to a battery of six guns; a four-gun battery would be about two thirds of this.) were formed for the division and the battery was assigned to II Brigade, RHA at Churn, along with Berkshire RHA and A Battery and B Battery, Honourable Artillery Company.

In November 1914, the division moved to Norfolk on coastal defence duties. Artillery headquarters was established at Cromer, before joining the divisional headquarters at Hanworth in December, and Nottinghamshire RHA was at Letheringsett (Nottinghamshire and Derbyshire Mounted Brigade was at Holt).

Overseas service

In March 1915, the 2nd Mounted Division was put on warning for overseas service. In early April, the division starting leaving Avonmouth and the last elements landed at Alexandria before the end of the month. By the middle of May, the horse artillery batteries were near Ismaïlia on Suez Canal Defences.

The 2nd Mounted Division was dismounted in August 1915 and served at Gallipoli. The artillery batteries and ammunition columns (along with the signal troops, mobile veterinary sections, Mounted Brigade Transport and Supply Columns and two of the Field Ambulances) were left behind in Egypt. The division returned from Gallipoli in December 1915 and was reformed and remounted.

The battery never rejoined the division; on 28 November 1915 the battery departed Ismailia for the Western Desert and joined the Western Frontier Force on formation at Mersa Matruh. It served throughout the Senussi Campaign, taking part in the Affairs at Wadi Senab (11 – 13 December 1915), Wadi Majid (25 December), and Halazin (23 January 1916), and in the action at Agagiya (26 February) which effectively ended the campaign.

Imperial Mounted Division

The Imperial Mounted Division was formed in Egypt in January 1917 with four cavalry brigades: the Australian 3rd and 4th Light Horse Brigades and the British 5th and 6th Mounted Brigades. The Nottinghamshire Battery was one of four that formed the XIX Brigade, Royal Horse Artillery (T.F.) to support the division. (Note: The other three batteries were Berkshire RHA, A Battery, HAC and B Battery, HAC. All four batteries were originally part of the 2nd Mounted Division.) In practice, the battery was attached to 3rd Light Horse Brigade.

The battery served with the Imperial Mounted Division in the Sinai and Palestine Campaign as part of the Desert Column. With the division, it took part in the advance across the Sinai. The battery was re-equipped with four 18 pounders in time for the First Battle of Gaza (26 – 27 March 1917). It also took part in the Second Battle of Gaza (17 – 19 April 1917).

Australian Mounted Division

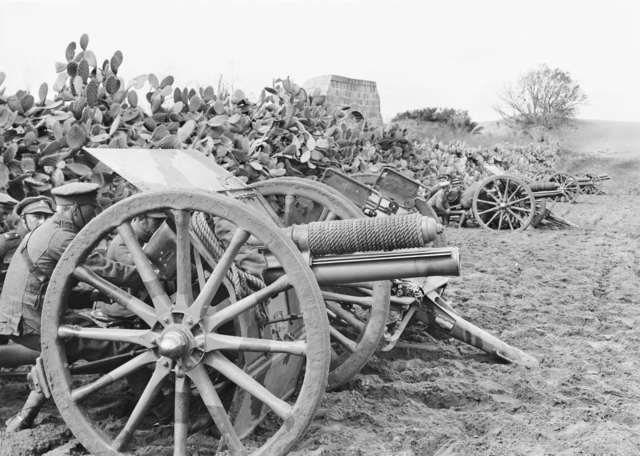
Gunners of A Battery, Honourable Artillery Company, attached to the Australian 4th Light Horse Brigade, crouch between their 13 pounder quick fire field guns and a cactus hedge near Belah, Palestine, in March 1918. At this time, they were in the XIX Brigade, Royal Horse Artillery (T.F.) along with 1/1st Notts RHA.

In June 1917, the Desert Column was reorganised from two mounted divisions of four brigades each (ANZAC and Imperial Mounted Divisions) to three mounted divisions of three brigades each (ANZAC, Australian – Imperial Mounted Division renamed – and the new Yeomanry Mounted Division). 6th Mounted Brigade, along with Berkshire RHA, joined the Yeomanry Mounted Division and on 20 June 1917 the Imperial Mounted Division was redesignated as Australian Mounted Division as the majority of its troops were now Australian. On 12 August 1917, the Desert Column disappeared and the Desert Mounted Corps was formed.

The battery served with the Australian Mounted Division for much of the remainder of the Sinai and Palestine Campaign. As part of the Desert Mounted Corps, the division took part in the Third Battle of Gaza (by now the battery was re-equipped with four 13 pounders), in particular the Capture of Beersheba (31 October) and the Battle of Mughar Ridge (13 and 14 November), and the defence of Jerusalem against the Turkish counter-attacks (27 November – 3 December).

Still part of the Desert Mounted Corps, the division took part in the Second Trans-Jordan Raid (30 April – 4 May 1918). XIX Brigade, RHA supported the 4th Light Horse Brigade in the advance on the Jisr ed Damiye–Es Salt track on 30 April. The next day, a strong Turkish force attacked from the direction of Jisr ed Damiye and soon the artillery was in danger. B Battery, HAC was in the rear and managed to get away with all but one of their guns (stuck in a wadi) but the Nottinghamshire RHA and A Battery, HAC were less fortunate. Machine gun fire cut down the horse teams before the guns could be gotten away. XIX Brigade lost 9 guns in total, the only guns to be lost in action in the entire campaign.

5th Cavalry Division

The battery was attached to the 5th Cavalry Division in September and October 1918 (Note: At this time, the 5th Cavalry Division only had a single artillery battery assigned to it – Essex Royal Horse Artillery.) to support the division in the Final Offensive including the Battle of Megiddo (19 – 25 September), the Capture of Damascus (1 October), and the Occupation of Aleppo (26 October).

==== 2/1st Nottinghamshire ====
2/1st Nottinghamshire RHA (T.F.) 812th Battery, RFA (T.F.)
- Active: 1914 – 1919
- Country: United Kingdom
- Branch: British Army
- Type: Artillery
- Size: Battery
- Part of: 2/1st Nottinghamshire and Derbyshire Mounted Brigade; CCXV Brigade RFA
- Equipment: Ordnance BL 15 pounder Ordnance BLC 15-pounder Ordnance QF 18-pounder
- Engagements: First World War Mesopotamian Campaign Action of Khan Baghdadi

Nottinghamshire RHA formed a 2nd line in 1914, initially designated as the Nottinghamshire (Reserve) Battery RHA and later given a fractional designation as 2/1st Nottinghamshire Battery, RHA.

By February 1915, the battery joined the 2nd Line 2/1st Nottinghamshire and Derbyshire Mounted Brigade, duplicate of the 1st Line Nottinghamshire and Derbyshire Mounted Brigade. On 6 March 1915, the 2/2nd Mounted Division was formed as a duplicate of the 2nd Mounted Division which had been warned for overseas service. The brigade joined the division on East Coast Defences in March 1915 and concentrated at Narborough with the battery at Scarning and Wendling. (Note: 2/1st Warwickshire Royal Horse Artillery, 2/1st Berkshire Royal Horse Artillery and 2/A Battery, HAC formed the other three batteries of the division.)

The batteries of the division were quite unready for war. Three had no horses, the fourth had just 23; three batteries had over 200 men on average, but the other just 91; one battery had no ammunition and another reported that its 15-pounders were "practically useless".

The battery remained with the division when it was redesignated as 3rd Mounted Division in March 1916 and as 1st Mounted Division (Note: Not to be confused with the original 1st Mounted Division which became 1st Cyclist Division, also in July 1916.) in July 1916. In September 1916, the battery was attached to the 8th Cyclist Brigade in 2nd Cyclist Division (former 4th Mounted Division) until the division was broken up on 16 November 1916.

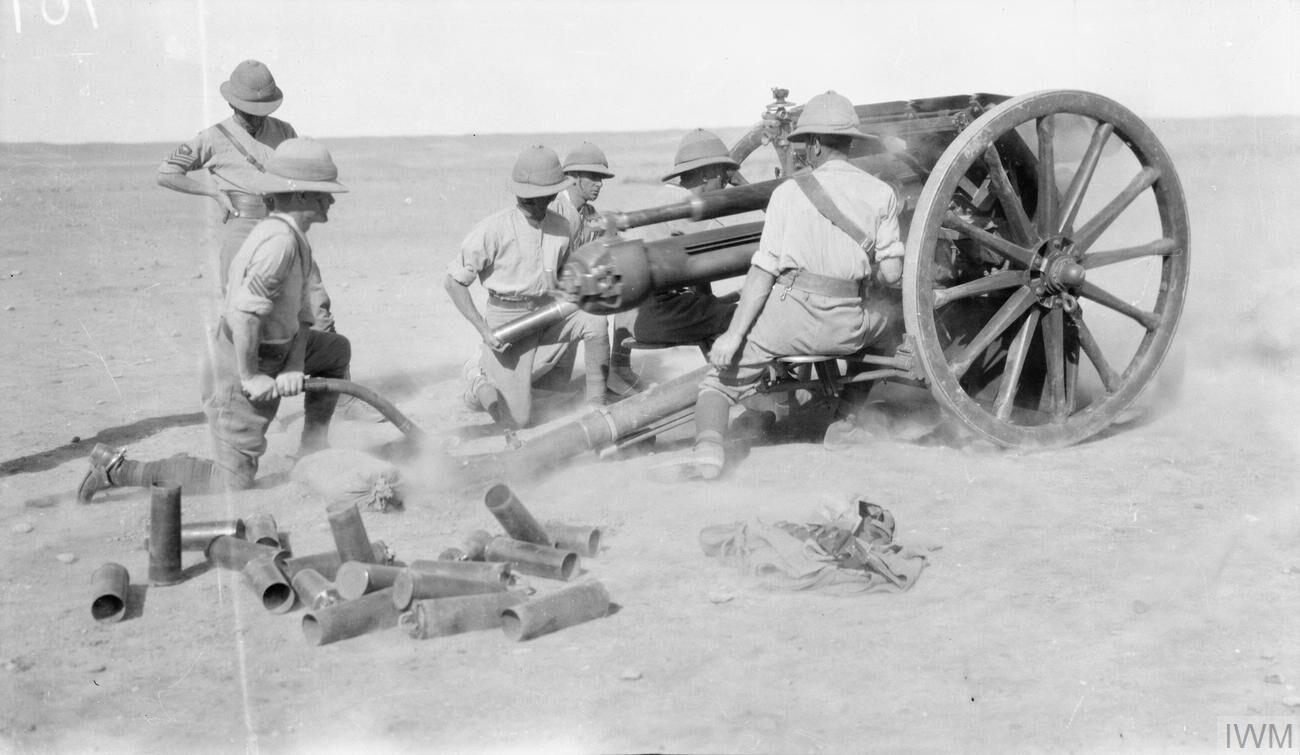
An 18 pounder crew of another battery in action in the open desert of lower Mesopotamia, March 1917.

The battery was posted overseas in June 1917, arriving at Basra on 13 August when it joined CCXV Brigade, RFA (T.F.) and was numbered as 812th Battery, RFA (T.F.). (Note: Becke, Frederick and Mills say the battery was numbered as 812th Battery, but Perry and Farndale say 816th Battery. Becke implies that it was numbered on 13 August 1917, agreeing with Frederick, Mills says 17 August 1917, whereas Perry says it was numbered in February 1918.) At this point it was armed with six 18 pounders. CCXV Brigade was serving with 3rd (Lahore) Division but was transferred to 15th Indian Division on 4 October. The battery remained with the 15th Indian Division, participating in the Mesopotamian campaign, for the remainder of the war. It took part in the Occupation of Hīt (9 March 1918) and the action of Khan Baghdadi (26 – 27 March). After the end of the war, the division was run down as units were posted away or repatriated, being disbanded in March 1919.

The 15th Indian Division was formally disbanded in March 1919, and there is no further mention of the 2/1st Nottinghamshire RHA in the official histories. Most British troops attached to Indian Army divisions in Mesopotamia found themselves in India when their divisions were disbanded/repatriated, as there was a shortage of shipping to get the men home to Britain. In April 1919 the Third Anglo-Afghan War broke out, and British troops were inducted into various units to serve. At least one soldier of the 2/1st Notts is known to have fought in this war with another battery.

=== Post war ===
The Nottinghamshire RHA was not reconstituted until 7 February 1920 when it formed a battery (later numbered 240th) in 1st North Midland Brigade, RFA (later 60th (North Midland) Field Regiment, RA) and ceased to be a Royal Horse Artillery battery. The Leicestershire RHA also joined the brigade as 240th Battery. In 1938 these two batteries were detached from 60th (NM) Field Regiment (as it had become) to form a separate 115th (North Midland) Field Regiment, RA, which saw service in the Battle of France and Burma Campaign in World War II. In 1950 it was amalgamated into 350 (South Notts Hussars Yeomanry) Heavy Regiment, RA.

== See also ==
- List of Territorial Force horse artillery batteries 1908
- The England test cricketer Harry Elliott, who had worked for Major Laycock before the war, served with the battery.

== Bibliography ==
- Becke, Archibald F. (1936). Order of Battle of Divisions Part 2A. The Territorial Force Mounted Divisions and the 1st-Line Territorial Force Divisions (42–56). London: HMSO. OCLC 4405016.
- Becke, Archibald F. (1945). Order of Battle of Divisions Part 4. The Army Council, G.H.Q.s, Armies and Corps, 1914-1919. London: HMSO. OCLC 4405016.
- Clarke, Dale (2004). British Artillery 1914–19 Field Army Artillery. Vol. 94 of New Vanguard Series. Oxford: Osprey Publishing. ISBN 1-84176-688-7.
- Farndale, General Sir Martin (1988). The Forgotten Fronts and the Home Base, 1914–18. History of the Royal Regiment of Artillery. Woolwich: The Royal Artillery Institution. ISBN 1-870114-05-1.
- Frederick, J.B.M. (1984). Lineage Book of British Land Forces 1660–1978. Wakefield, Yorkshire: Microform Academic Publishers. ISBN 1-85117-009-X.
- James, Brigadier E.A. (1978). British Regiments 1914–18. London: Samson Books Limited. ISBN 0-906304-03-2.
- Norman E.H. Litchfield, The Territorial Artillery 1908–1988 (Their Lineage, Uniforms and Badges), Nottingham: Sherwood Press, 1992, ISBN 0-9508205-2-0.
- Perry, F.W. (1992). Order of Battle of Divisions Part 5A. The Divisions of Australia, Canada and New Zealand and those in East Africa. Newport: Ray Westlake Military Books. ISBN 1-871167-25-6.
- Perry, F.W. (1993). Order of Battle of Divisions Part 5B. Indian Army Divisions. Newport: Ray Westlake Military Books. ISBN 1-871167-23-X.
- Rinaldi, Richard A (2008). Order of Battle of the British Army 1914. Ravi Rikhye. ISBN 978-0-97760728-0.
- Westlake, Ray (1992). British Territorial Units 1914–18. Osprey Publishing. ISBN 978-1-85532-168-7.
