= B Battery, Honourable Artillery Company =

Former British Army artillery battery

B Battery (2nd City of London Horse Artillery), Honourable Artillery Company
- Active: 22 November 1781 – 16 February 1920
- Country: United Kingdom
- Branch: British Army
- Type: Artillery
- Size: Battery
- Part of: South Eastern Mounted Brigade
- peacetime HQ: Armoury House, Finsbury
- Equipment: Ordnance QF 15-pounder Ordnance QF 13-pounder Ordnance QF 18-pounder
- Engagements: First World War Sheikh Othman Sinai and Palestine 1916-18 First Battle of Gaza Second Battle of Gaza Third Battle of Gaza Battle of Beersheba (1917) Battle of Mughar Ridge Battle of Jerusalem Second Trans-Jordan Raid Capture of Damascus (1918)

B Battery (2nd City of London Horse Artillery), Honourable Artillery Company was a horse artillery battery that was formed from the Field Artillery, HAC in 1899. It transferred to the Territorial Force in 1908 as artillery support for the South Eastern Mounted Brigade.

It saw active service during the First World War in the Middle East, notably at Aden and in particular in the Sinai and Palestine Campaign, from 1915 to 1918.

The second line battery – 2/B Battery, HAC – was formed in 1914 and served on the Western Front in 1917 and 1918 as part of an Army Field Artillery Brigade; the third line – B (Reserve) Battery, HAC – was formed in 1915 to provide trained replacements for the 1st and 2nd Line batteries.

Post war, the battery, along with A Battery, Honourable Artillery Company, was amalgamated with the City of London Yeomanry (Rough Riders) to form the 11th (Honourable Artillery Company and City of London Yeomanry) Brigade, RHA.

== History ==
=== Formation ===
The Battery traces it history back to 22 November 1781 when the Honourable Artillery Company (HAC) formed the Matross Division, HAC with two companies of foot artillery. In 1802, it was increased to four companies and later in the century it was redesignated as the Artillery Division, HAC. In 1853, it was reorganized as a single battery of field artillery and redesignated as the Field Artillery, HAC in 1891.

In 1899 it was once again converted, this time to horse artillery as B Battery (2nd City of London Horse Artillery), HAC. At the same time the Horse Battery, HAC was redesignated as A Battery (1st City of London Horse Artillery), HAC. The Horse Battery originated in 1891 and was the first to form a horse artillery battery, hence the senior designation.

The batteries sponsored the field battery of the City Imperial Volunteers for service in the Second Boer War in 1900–02.

=== Territorial Force ===
The Territorial Force (TF) was formed on 1 April 1908 following the enactment of the Territorial and Reserve Forces Act 1907 (7 Edw.7, c.9) which combined and re-organised the old Volunteer Force, the Honourable Artillery Company and the Yeomanry. On formation, the TF contained 14 infantry divisions and 14 mounted yeomanry brigades. Each yeomanry brigade included a horse artillery battery and an ammunition column. 12 of these were provided by Royal Horse Artillery batteries of the Territorial Force, the other two by the Honourable Artillery Company.

On 1 April 1908, the battery transferred to the Territorial Force without a change in title. The unit consisted of the battery and South Eastern Mounted Brigade Ammunition Column at Armoury House, Finsbury. The battery was equipped with four Ehrhardt 15-pounder guns and allocated as artillery support to the South Eastern Mounted Brigade though attached to the London Mounted Brigade for training in peacetime.

=== First World War ===
In accordance with the Territorial and Reserve Forces Act 1907 (7 Edw.7, c.9) which brought the Territorial Force into being, the TF was intended to be a home defence force for service during wartime and members could not be compelled to serve outside the country. However, on the outbreak of war on 4 August 1914, many members volunteered for Imperial Service. Therefore, TF units were split into 1st Line (liable for overseas service) and 2nd Line (home service for those unable or unwilling to serve overseas) units. 2nd Line units performed the home defence role, although in fact most of these were also posted abroad in due course. Later, a 3rd Line was formed to act as a reserve, providing trained replacements for the 1st and 2nd Line batteries.

==== 1/B Battery, HAC ====
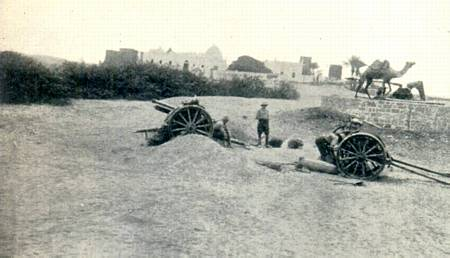
A QF 15 pounder of B Battery, Honourable Artillery Company, at Sheik Othman, Aden.

The 1st Line battery was embodied with the South Eastern Mounted Brigade on 4 August 1914 at the outbreak of the First World War and concentrated in the Canterbury area of Kent under Second Army of Central Force. A decision was made to form a new mounted division from the mounted brigades in and around the Churn area of Berkshire. On 2 September 1914, 2nd Mounted Division, with Headquarters at Goring, came into being. The battery joined the division from Canterbury and attached to the 2nd South Midland Mounted Brigade.

I Brigade and II Brigade, RHA (T.F.) (Note: The basic organic unit of the Royal Artillery was, and is, the Battery. When grouped together they formed brigades, in the same way that infantry battalions or cavalry regiments were grouped together in brigades. At the outbreak of the First World War, a field artillery brigade of headquarters (4 officers, 37 other ranks), three batteries (5 and 193 each), and a brigade ammunition column (4 and 154) had a total strength just under 800 so was broadly comparable to an infantry battalion (just over 1,000) or a cavalry regiment (about 550). Like an infantry battalion, an artillery brigade was usually commanded by a Lieutenant-Colonel. Artillery brigades were redesignated as regiments in 1938. Note that the battery strength refers to a battery of six guns; a four-gun battery would be about two thirds of this.) were formed for the division and the battery was assigned to II Brigade, RHA at Churn, along with A Battery, HAC and Berkshire and Nottinghamshire Batteries RHA. On 1 November, Warwickshire RHA of I Brigade, RHA (T.F.) was posted to France: the first Territorial Force artillery battery to go on active service. B Battery, HAC was transferred to I Brigade to replace it, though in practice the battery served with 1st South Midland Mounted Brigade, Warwickshire RHA's original brigade.

In November 1914, the 2nd Mounted Division moved to Norfolk on coastal defence duties. Artillery headquarters was established at Cromer, before joining the divisional headquarters at Hanworth in December, and the battery was at Gayton (1st South Midland Mounted Brigade was at King's Lynn).

Overseas service

In March 1915, the division was put on warning for overseas service. In early April, the division starting leaving Avonmouth and the last elements landed at Alexandria before the end of the month. By the middle of May, the horse artillery batteries were near Ismaïlia on Suez Canal Defences. On 14 July 1915, B Battery, HAC (along with Berkshire RHA and 28th Indian Brigade) left for Aden. They fought a sharp action at Sheikh Othman on 20 July that removed the Turkish threat to Aden for the rest of the war, before returning to Egypt.

The 2nd Mounted Division was dismounted in August 1915 and served at Gallipoli. The artillery batteries and ammunition columns, signal troops, mobile veterinary sections, Mounted Brigade Transport and Supply Columns and two of the Field Ambulances were left behind in Egypt. The division returned from Gallipoli in December 1915 and was reformed and remounted. On 13 December 1915, the battery briefly rejoined the division from Ismailia, Suez Canal Defences; it left again on 21 January 1916 as the division was broken up. In February 1916, the battery was rearmed with four 13 pounders and rejoined the Suez Canal Defences at Balla. It remained there until 16 October 1917 when it joined the 5th Mounted Brigade (the renumbered 1st South Midland Mounted Brigade).

Imperial Mounted Division

The Imperial Mounted Division was formed in Egypt in January 1917; 5th Mounted Brigade was one of the four cavalry brigades selected to form the division. B Battery, HAC joined the division on formation and was assigned to XIX Brigade, Royal Horse Artillery (T.F.). (Note: The other three batteries were Nottinghamshire RHA, Berkshire RHA, and A Battery, HAC. All four batteries were originally part of the 2nd Mounted Division.) In practice, the battery remained attached to its mounted brigade.

The battery, and its brigade, served with the Imperial Mounted Division in the Sinai and Palestine Campaign as part of the Desert Column. With the division, it took part in the advance across the Sinai. The battery was re-equipped with four 18 pounders in time for the First Battle of Gaza (26 – 27 March 1917). It also took part in the Second Battle of Gaza (17 – 19 April 1917).

Australian Mounted Division

In June 1917, the Desert Column was reorganised from two mounted divisions of four brigades each (ANZAC and Imperial Mounted Divisions) to three mounted divisions of three brigades each (ANZAC, Australian and the new Yeomanry Mounted Division). The battery (and 5th Mounted Brigade) remained with the Imperial Mounted Division when it was renamed Australian Mounted Division on 30 June 1917 and served with it for the rest of the war. With the division, it took part in the Third Battle of Gaza including the Capture of Beersheba and the Battle of Mughar Ridge. It also resisted the Turkish counter-attacks in the Turkish Defence of Jerusalem.

In March 1918, the 5th Mounted Brigade left the division for the new 2nd Mounted Division (Note: Not to be confused with the original 2nd Mounted Division that served dismounted at Gallipoli.) and was replaced by the newly formed 5th Light Horse Brigade; B Battery, HAC was now attached to this brigade.

Still part of the Desert Mounted Corps, the division took part in the Second Trans-Jordan Raid (30 April – 4 May 1918). XIX Brigade, RHA supported the 4th Light Horse Brigade in the advance on the Jisr ed Damiye–Es Salt track on 30 April. The next day, a strong Turkish force attacked from the direction of Jisr ed Damiye and soon the artillery was in danger. B Battery, HAC was in the rear and managed to get away with all but one of their guns (stuck in a wadi) but the Nottinghamshire RHA and A Battery, HAC were less fortunate. Machine gun fire cut down the horse teams before the guns could be gotten away. XIX Brigade lost 9 guns in total, the only guns to be lost in action in the entire campaign.

Its final action was the capture of Damascus (1 October).

After the Armistice of Mudros, the division was withdrawn to Egypt and started to demobilise. The last of the Australians returned home in April and May 1919. B Battery, HAC were reduced to cadre in Egypt on 25 October 1919.

==== 2/B Battery, HAC ====
2/B Battery, Honourable Artillery Company
- Active: September 1914 – 1919
- Country: United Kingdom
- Branch: British Army
- Type: Artillery
- Size: Battery
- Part of: 2/1st Western Mounted Brigade; CXXVI Brigade, RFA
- Equipment: Ordnance BL 15 pounder Ordnance BLC 15-pounder Ordnance QF 18-pounder
- Engagements: First World War Western Front

B Battery formed a 2nd line in September 1914, initially designated as the B (Reserve) Battery HAC. It was redesignated as 2/B Battery, HAC on 26 September.

In July 1915, the battery became an overseas unit – that is, liable for service overseas. In December 1915, the battery received four Ordnance BLC 15-pounders. In May 1916, the battery moved to Cupar, Fife where it joined 14th Cyclist Brigade (former 2/1st Western Mounted Brigade). It left Cupar on 10 May 1917 and proceeded to Heytesbury, Wiltshire where it joined CXXVI Brigade, RFA. It was rearmed with 18 pounders at this time.

Army Field Brigade

CXXVI Brigade, RFA was reformed (Note: The original CXXVI Brigade, RFA was formed from November 1914 as an 18 pounder gun brigade for the original 32nd Division in Kitchener's Fourth New Army. The divisions of the Fourth New Army were broken up on 10 April 1915 and the brigade was transferred to the 37th Division. It joined the division on 15 April as a 4.5" howitzer brigade and proceeded to France with the division at the end of July 1915. It served with the division on the Western Front until 28 January 1917 when it was broken up.) at Heytesbury, Wiltshire in May 1917 with 2/A Battery and 2/B Battery HAC, both with six 18 pounders. The brigade (with the battery) landed at Boulogne on 22 June 1917 and it became an Army Field Brigade. (Note: Army Field Artillery Brigades were artillery brigades that were excess to the needs of the divisions, withdrawn to form an artillery reserve.) 2/1st Warwickshire RHA, by now also rearmed with 18 pounders, proceeded to France on 21 June 1917 and joined the brigade there. The battery served on the Western Front for the rest of the war.

At the Armistice, the battery (six 18 pounders) was still with CXXVI Brigade, RFA serving as Army Troops with the First Army. The battery entered Germany on 16 January 1919, and was disbanded later the same year.

==== B (Reserve) Battery, HAC ====
B (Reserve) Battery, HAC was formed in 1915 to replace the original reserve battery which had been redesignated as 2/B Battery on 26 September 1914. It never left the United Kingdom and was disbanded later.

=== Post war ===
On 7 February 1920, the Honourable Artillery Company was authorized to reconstitute four batteries of horse artillery in the Territorial Force. Only two were actually formed (A and B Batteries), and authorization for the other two was rescinded in 1921. The batteries were amalgamated with the City of London Yeomanry (Rough Riders) on 16 February to form the 11th (Honourable Artillery Company and City of London Yeomanry) Brigade, RHA with

- Headquarters at Finsbury Barracks
- A Battery at Armoury House, Finsbury
- B Battery at Armoury House, Finsbury
- C Battery at Bunhill Row, formed by reduction of the City of London Yeomanry

== See also ==
- List of Territorial Force horse artillery batteries 1908

== Bibliography ==
- Becke, Archibald F. (1936). Order of Battle of Divisions Part 2A. The Territorial Force Mounted Divisions and the 1st-Line Territorial Force Divisions (42–56). London: HMSO. OCLC 4405016.
- Becke, Archibald F. (1945). Order of Battle of Divisions Part 3B. New Army Divisions (30-41) & 63rd (R.N.) Division. London: HMSO. OCLC 4405016.
- Clarke, Dale (2004). British Artillery 1914–19 Field Army Artillery. Vol. 94 of New Vanguard Series. Oxford: Osprey Publishing. ISBN 1-84176-688-7.
- Farndale, General Sir Martin (1988). The Forgotten Fronts and the Home Base, 1914–18. History of the Royal Regiment of Artillery. Woolwich: The Royal Artillery Institution. ISBN 1-870114-05-1.
- Frederick, J.B.M. (1984). Lineage Book of British Land Forces 1660–1978. Wakefield, Yorkshire: Microform Academic Publishers. ISBN 1-85117-009-X.
- James, Brigadier E.A. (1978). British Regiments 1914–18. London: Samson Books Limited. ISBN 0-906304-03-2.
- Perry, F.W. (1992). Order of Battle of Divisions Part 5A. The Divisions of Australia, Canada and New Zealand and those in East Africa. Newport: Ray Westlake Military Books. ISBN 1-871167-25-6.
- Rinaldi, Richard A (2008). Order of Battle of the British Army 1914. Ravi Rikhye. ISBN 978-0-97760728-0.
- Westlake, Ray (1992). British Territorial Units 1914–18. Osprey Publishing. ISBN 978-1-85532-168-7.
- Order of Battle of the British Armies in France, November 11th, 1918. France: General Staff, GHQ. 1918.
