= 2nd Mounted Division =

WW1 British Army formation

- Active: 2 September 1914 – 21 January 1916
- Country: United Kingdom
- Branch: British Army
- Type: Yeomanry
- Size: Division
- Part of: IX Corps
- Engagements: World War I Gallipoli Campaign Battle of Scimitar Hill

Commanders
- Notable commanders: General Sir William Eliot Peyton KCB KCVO DSO

The 2nd Mounted Division was a yeomanry (Territorial Force cavalry) division that served in the First World War. At the outbreak of war it was assigned to defence of the Norfolk coast. In March 1915 it formed a 2nd Line (Note: In accordance with the Territorial and Reserve Forces Act 1907 (7 Edw. 7, c.9) which brought the Territorial Force into being, the TF was intended to be a home defence force for service during wartime and members could not be compelled to serve outside the country. However, on the outbreak of war on 4 August 1914, many members volunteered for Imperial Service. Therefore, TF units were split into 1st Line (liable for overseas service) and 2nd Line (home service for those unable or unwilling to serve overseas) units. 2nd Line units performed the home defence role, although in fact most of these were also posted abroad in due course. Likewise, existing pre-war formations (brigades and divisions) formed duplicate 2nd Lines with the same structure as their 1st Line parents.) duplicate of itself, the 2/2nd Mounted Division. Leaving the 2/2nd on coastal defence, it then fought at Gallipoli from April to December 1915, under the command of Major General William Peyton, before being disbanded in January 1916.

A different 2nd Mounted Division, was formed in Egypt in 1918 from the Indian elements of the 5th Cavalry Division in France, but then renumbered as the 5th Cavalry Division, served in Palestine and was a part of the Palestine Occupation Force.

== History ==
=== Formation ===
A decision was made to form a new mounted division from the mounted brigades in and around the Churn area of Berkshire. On 2 September 1914, 2nd Mounted Division, with Headquarters at Goring, came into being with three mounted brigades transferred from 1st Mounted Division (1st South Midland Mounted Brigade at Newbury, 2nd South Midland Mounted Brigade at Churn and the Nottinghamshire and Derbyshire Mounted Brigade at South Stoke) and the London Mounted Brigade at Streatley. The brigades were relatively widely dispersed to allow an adequate water supply for the horses and to provide sufficient training areas.

Order of Battle, September 1914
1st South Midland Mounted Brigade 1/1st Warwickshire Yeomanry; 1/1st Royal Gloucestershire Hussars; 1/1st Queen's Own Worcestershire Hussars	London Mounted Brigade 1/1st County of London Yeomanry; 1/1st City of London Yeomanry (Rough Riders); 1/3rd County of London Yeomanry (Sharpshooters)	Medical 1st South Midland Field Ambulance, RAMC; 2nd South Midland Field Ambulance, RAMC; Notts. and Derby. Field Ambulance, RAMC; London Field Ambulance, RAMC
2nd South Midland Mounted Brigade 1/1st Royal Buckinghamshire Hussars; 1/1st Queen's Own Oxfordshire Hussars; 1/1st Queen's Own Dorset Yeomanry (Note: 1/1st Queen's Own Dorset Yeomanry replaced 1/1st Queen's Own Oxfordshire Hussars who landed in France on 22 September 1914.); 1/1st Berkshire Yeomanry	Royal Horse Artillery (Territorial Force) I Brigade, Royal Horse Artillery (T.F.) 1/1st Warwickshire RHA and 1st South Midland Ammunition Column 1/B Battery, HAC (Note: B Battery, Honourable Artillery Company replaced Warwickshire RHA who landed in France on 1 November 1914. It was the first Territorial Force artillery battery to go on active service.) II Brigade, Royal Horse Artillery (T.F.) 1/1st Berkshire RHA and 2nd South Midland Ammunition Column 1/1st Nottinghamshire RHA and Notts. and Derby. Ammunition Column 1/A Battery, HAC and London Ammunition Column 1/B Battery, HAC	Veterinary 1st South Midland Mobile Veterinary Section; 2nd South Midland Mobile Veterinary Section; Notts. and Derby. Mobile Veterinary Section; London Mobile Veterinary Section
Nottinghamshire and Derbyshire Mounted Brigade 1/1st Sherwood Rangers Yeomanry; 1/1st South Nottinghamshire Hussars; 1/1st Derbyshire Yeomanry	Signal Service 1st South Midland Signal Troop; 2nd South Midland Signal Troop; Notts. and Derby. Signal Troop; London Signal Troop; 2nd Mounted Division Signal Squadron	2nd Mounted Division Train 1st South Midland Transport and Supply Column, ASC; 2nd South Midland Transport and Supply Column, ASC; Notts. and Derby. Transport and Supply Column, ASC; London Transport and Supply Column, ASC; 2nd Mounted Division Company, ASC

In November 1914, the division moved to Norfolk on coastal defence duties. Headquarters was established at Hanworth and the mounted brigades were at King's Lynn (1st South Midland), Fakenham (2nd South Midland), Holt (Notts. and Derby.) and Hanworth (London).

=== Egypt ===
In March 1915, the division, commanded by Major General William Peyton, was put on warning for overseas service. In early April, the division started leaving Avonmouth and the last elements landed at Alexandria, Egypt, before the end of the month. By the middle of May, the divisional headquarters, the 2nd South Midland Mounted Brigade and Notts. and Derby. Mounted Brigade were at Cairo, the 1st South Midland Mounted Brigade was at Alexandria, and the London Mounted Brigade and the horse artillery batteries were near Ismaïlia on Suez Canal defences. The mounted brigades were numbered at this time.

On 10 August 1915, the division was reorganized as a dismounted formation in preparation for service at Gallipoli. Each Yeomanry regiment left a squadron headquarters and two troops (about 100 officers and men) in Egypt to look after the horses. The artillery batteries and ammunition columns, signal troops, mobile veterinary sections, Mounted Brigade Transport and Supply Columns and two of the Field Ambulances were also left behind in Egypt. The Yeomanry Mounted Brigade, which was formed in Egypt in January 1915, was likewise dismounted and joined the division on 13 August as a fifth brigade. The division entrained for Alexandria on 13 August, sailed the next day and reached Mudros on 17 August. It landed at Suvla Bay that night.

Order of Battle, August 1915
1st (1st South Midland) Mounted Brigade 1/1st Warwickshire Yeomanry; 1/1st Royal Gloucestershire Hussars; 1/1st Queen's Own Worcestershire Hussars	5th Mounted Brigade 1/1st Hertfordshire Yeomanry; 1/2nd County of London Yeomanry
2nd (2nd South Midland) Mounted Brigade 1/1st Royal Buckinghamshire Hussars; 1/1st Queen's Own Dorset Yeomanry; 1/1st Berkshire Yeomanry	Signal Service 2nd Mounted Division Signal Squadron
3rd (Nottinghamshire and Derbyshire) Mounted Brigade 1/1st Sherwood Rangers Yeomanry; 1/1st South Nottinghamshire Hussars; 1/1st Derbyshire Yeomanry	Medical 2nd South Midland Field Ambulance, RAMC; London Field Ambulance, RAMC
4th (London) Mounted Brigade 1/1st County of London Yeomanry; 1/1st City of London Yeomanry (Rough Riders); 1/3rd County of London Yeomanry (Sharpshooters)	2nd Mounted Division Train 2nd Mounted Division Company, ASC

=== Gallipoli ===
The division landed at "A" Beach, Suvla Bay on the night of 17 August / morning of 18 August and moved into reserve positions at Lala Baba on the night of 20 August. On 21 August it advanced to Chocolate Hill under heavy fire and took part in the attack on Hill 112.

Due to losses during the Battle of Scimitar Hill and wastage during August 1915, the division had to be reorganised. (Note: At this time, a cavalry or yeomanry regiment had a strength of 550 officers and men. Having left a party of 100 officers and men in Egypt, they would have landed in Gallipoli no more than 450 strong, or about 6,300 for the 14 regiments. This would be about half the strength of an infantry division (12 battalions of 1,000 officers and men).) On 4 September 1915, the 1st Composite Mounted Brigade was formed from the 1st, 2nd and 5th Mounted Brigades, and the 2nd Composite Mounted Brigade from the 3rd and 4th Mounted Brigades. Each dismounted brigade formed a battalion sized unit, for example, 1st South Midland Regiment (Warwickshire, Gloucestershire and Worcestershire Yeomanry).

The Scottish Horse Mounted Brigade landed as Suvla on 2 September and joined the division. Likewise, the Highland Mounted Brigade joined the division after landing on 26 September. Both brigades were dismounted in the UK before sailing directly for Gallipoli.

Order of Battle, September 1915
1st Composite Mounted Brigade 1st South Midland Regiment; 2nd South Midland Regiment; 5th Yeomanry Regiment	Engineers 1st Kent Field Company, RE; 2nd Kent Field Company, RE
2nd Composite Mounted Brigade 3rd Nottinghamshire and Derbyshire Regiment; 4th London Regiment	Signal Service 2nd Mounted Division Signal Squadron
Scottish Horse Mounted Brigade 1/1st Scottish Horse; 1/2nd Scottish Horse; 1/3rd Scottish Horse	Medical 2nd South Midland Field Ambulance, RAMC; London Field Ambulance, RAMC; Scottish Horse Field Ambulance, RAMC; Highland Field Ambulance, RAMC
Highland Mounted Brigade 1/1st Fife and Forfar Yeomanry; 1/1st Lovat Scouts; 1/2nd Lovat Scouts	2nd Mounted Division Train 2nd Mounted Division Company, ASC

=== Return to Egypt ===
The division returned to Egypt from Gallipoli in December 1915 and was reformed and remounted. The artillery batteries and other units left in Egypt rejoined the division between 10 and 20 December 1915. However, the dismemberment of the division began almost immediately as units were posted to the Western Frontier Force or to various other commands.

- 1st South Midland Mounted Brigade left the division on 3 and 4 January 1916 for Es Salhia. The brigade served as Corps Troops in Egypt from 21 January 1916. On 31 March 1916, the remaining Mounted Brigades were numbered in a single sequence. As a consequence, the 1st South Midland Mounted Brigade was redesignated as 5th Mounted Brigade on 20 April. It joined the Imperial Mounted Division in January 1917.
- 2nd South Midland Mounted Brigade left the division on 17 January 1916 and was sent to the Western Frontier of Egypt as an independent formation. It was redesignated as 6th Mounted Brigade in April 1916. It served with the Western Frontier Force from January to October 1916 and also joined the Imperial Mounted Division in January 1917.
- Nottinghamshire and Derbyshire Mounted Brigade left the division on 18 and 19 January 1916. In February 1916 the brigade was sent to take part in the Salonika Campaign. It was redesignated as 7th Mounted Brigade and returned to Egypt in June 1917.
- London Mounted Brigade left the division on 18 January 1916 and was sent to Abbassia. It served as part of the Suez Canal Defences. It was redesignated as 8th Mounted Brigade. From November 1916 to June 1917 it also served at Salonika before returning to Egypt in June 1917. The brigade joined the newly formed Yeomanry Mounted Division on 21 July 1917 at el Fuqari.
- Yeomanry Mounted Brigade left the 2nd Mounted Division on 7 December 1915, was reformed and remounted, and joined the Western Frontier Force. By March 1916, the brigade had been broken up.

On 21 January 1916, 2nd Mounted Division was disbanded.

== Commanders ==
The 2nd Mounted Division had the following commanders:

From	Rank	Name
31 August 1914	Major-General	W.E. Peyton
21 August 1915	Brigadier-General	P.A. Kenna, VC (acting)
23 August 1915	Major-General	W.E. Peyton
13 November 1915	Brigadier-General	Marquis of Tullibardine (acting)
14 November 1915	Major-General	W.E. Peyton

== See also ==
- List of British divisions in World War I
- British yeomanry during the First World War

== Bibliography ==
- Becke, Archibald F. (1936). Order of Battle of Divisions Part 2A. The Territorial Force Mounted Divisions and the 1st-Line Territorial Force Divisions (42–56). London: HMSO. OCLC 4405016.
- Frederick, J.B.M. (1984). Lineage Book of British Land Forces 1660–1978. Wakefield, Yorkshire: Microform Academic Publishers. ISBN 1-85117-009-X.
- James, Brigadier E.A. (1978). British Regiments 1914–18. London: Samson Books Limited. ISBN 0-906304-03-2.
- Perry, F.W. (1992). Order of Battle of Divisions Part 5A. The Divisions of Australia, Canada and New Zealand and those in East Africa. Newport: Ray Westlake Military Books. ISBN 1-871167-25-6.
- Rinaldi, Richard A (2008). Order of Battle of the British Army 1914. Ravi Rikhye. ISBN 978-0-9776072-8-0.
- Westlake, Ray (1996). British Regiments at Gallipoli. Barnsley: Leo Cooper. ISBN 0-85052-511-X.
