= Western Frontier Force =

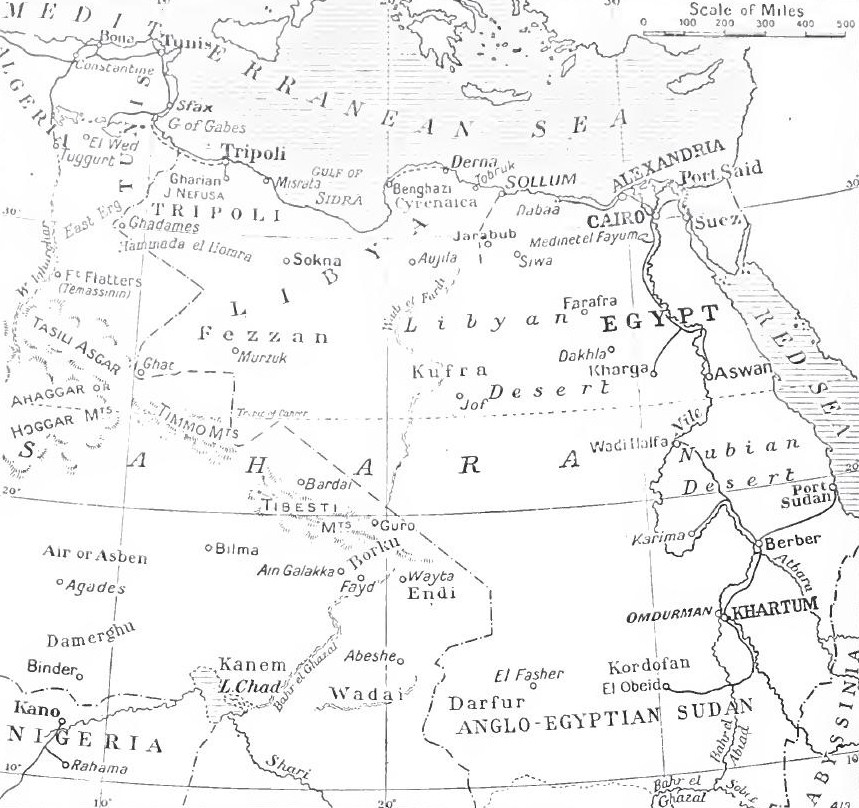
- Western Desert of Egypt
- Active: 1915–1918
- Disbanded: 1918
- Country: British Empire
- Branch: Army
- Engagements: Affair of the Wadi Senab; Affair of the Wadi Majid; Affair of Halazin; Action of Agagia; Affairs in the Dakhla Oasis; Operations at Girba and Siwa

Commanders
- Notable commanders: Major-General Sir Charles Dobell

The Western Frontier Force was raised from British Empire troops during the Senussi campaign from November 1915 to February 1917, under the command of the Egyptian Expeditionary Force (EEF). Orders for the formation of the force were issued on 20 November 1915, under Major-General Alexander Wallace, C.B. The force concentrated at Mersa Matruh on the coast and began operations against the Senussi in late 1915.

== Organisational history ==
In January 1916, during the Band of Oases campaign, a Southern Force was formed under Major-General William Peyton, who replaced Wallace two weeks later and then the Southern force was taken over by Major-General John Adye. On 31 March, the Southern Force merged with the Western Force that was then divided into a North-West Section and a South-West Section and Adye was made Adjutant-General of the Egyptian Expeditionary Force (EEF). Peyton was appointed to the command of the Western Frontier Force (WFF) but was reappointed while in England. On 11 May, Lieutenant-General Sir Bryan Mahon took over but got sunstroke and was invalided.

Major-General Alister Dallas, in temporary command during Peyton's absence, resumed temporary command until 20 June, when Major-General Sir Charles Dobell took up the appointment. The North-West and South-West sections were abolished and a Coastal Section formed. On 4 October, Major-General W. A. Watson took over from Dobell, who was sent to command the Eastern Force (EF) in Sinai. On 5 March 1917, the quiet on the frontier led to the WFF being amalgamated with the Delta Command (Brigadier-General Hugh Casson), comprising a Coastal and a Southern section.

== Commanders ==
(Data from Macmunn and Falls, "Military Operations Egypt and Palestine", volume I [1928])

- Major-General Alexander Wallace
- Major-General William Peyton
- Major-General Alister Dallas (temp)
- Lieutenant-General Sir Bran Mahon
- Major-General Alister Dallas (temp)
- Major-General Sir Charles Dobell
- Major-General William Watson
- Brigadier-General Hugh Casson

== Orders of battle ==
=== January 1914 ===
(Data from Macmunn and Falls, "Military Operations Egypt and Palestine", volume I (1996 [1928]) unless specified. Later information suggested that there were 10,000 Senussi.

- Derna district
  - 3,000 paid regulars
  - 6,000 volunteers (unpaid)
- Benghazi district
  - 3,000 paid regulars
  - 5,000 volunteers
- Tripoli district
  - 600 African soldiers
  - 800 Zowai Arabs
  - 1,000 Tuareg

=== 20 November 1915 ===
(Data from Macmunn and Falls, "Military Operations Egypt and Palestine", volume I (1996 [1928]) unless specified.)

- Composite Yeomanry Brigade. (Brigadier-General Tyndale Biscoe)
  - 3 Composite yeomanry regiments from the 2nd Mounted Division, comprising details from more than twenty regiments
  - 1 Composite regiment of Australian Light Horse, made up of details from Australian light horse brigades
  - 1/1st Nottinghamshire Royal Horse Artillery
  - Ammunition Column
- Composite Infantry Brigade (Brigadier-General Lord Lucan)
  - 1/6th Battalion Royal Scots (Territorials)
  - 2/7th Battalion Middlesex Regiment (Territorials)
  - 2/8th Battalion Middlesex Regiment (Territorials)
  - 15th Sikhs
- 1 Squadron Royal Flying Corps
- Divisional Train from the 1st Australian Division
- Detachment from the Egyptian Army Military Works Department took the place of the Royal Engineers, none of the latter being available

The composition of the force frequently changed and only settled in the middle of February 1916. Other units attached to the WFF included:

- 1st South African Infantry Brigade
- 2nd Battalion New Zealand Rifle Brigade
- Bikanir Camel Corps
- Imperial Camel Corps
- The Duke of Westminster's armoured car unit
- Armoured train manned by the Egyptian Artillery
- 1/1st North Midland Mounted Brigade plus attached artillery
- 6th Mounted Brigade (The 6th and 22nd were new titles of the 1/2nd South Midland and 1/1st North Midland brigades.)
- 22nd Mounted Brigade
- 2nd Dismounted (Yeomanry) Brigade
- 3rd Dismounted (Yeomanry) Brigade
- 4th Dismounted (Yeomanry) Brigade
  - Reconnaissance aircraft
  - Auxiliary troops
