= QF 15-pounder gun =

Ordnance QF 15-pounder Mk I
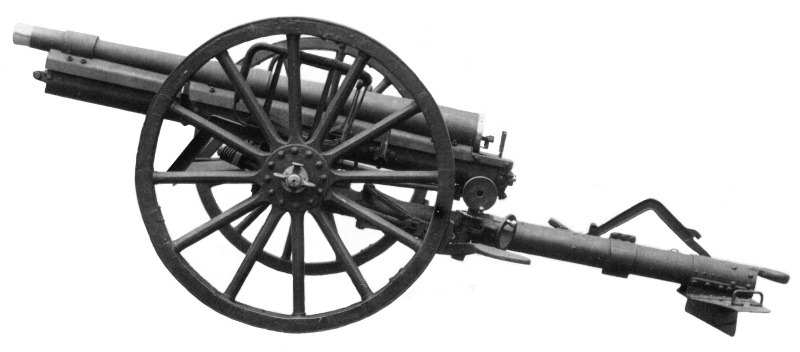
- QF 15-pounder Mk I with standard British wooden wheels, original axle-tree seats and no shield
- Type: Light field gun
- Place of origin: German Empire

Service history
- In service: 1901–1916
- Used by: United Kingdom
- Wars: World War I

Production history
- Designer: Heinrich Ehrhardt
- Manufacturer: Rheinische Metallwaren und Maschinenfabrik
- No. built: 108 (Note: This is the number purchased by Britain})

Specifications
- Mass: Barrel & breech 737 lb (334 kg); Total 2,272 lb (1,031 kg)
- Barrel length: Bore 7 ft 2 in (2.2 m); Total 7 ft 6 in (2.3 m)
- Crew: 10
- Shell: 76.2 x 169mm .R; Separate loading QF. Shrapnel, 14 lb (6.4 kg)
- Calibre: 3 in (76 mm)
- Breech: single motion, tapered block with interrupted collars
- Recoil: Hydro-spring, constant, 48 in (1.2 m)
- Carriage: wheeled, pole trail
- Elevation: -5° – 16°
- Traverse: 3° L & R
- Rate of fire: 20 rds/min
- Muzzle velocity: 1,674 ft/s (510 m/s) (Note: according to Hall, Hogg & Thurston. As the British initially used German ammunition and later their own, performance may have differed with ammunition)
- Maximum firing range: 7,000 yd (6,400 m)? (percussion fuze); 6,600 yd (6,000 m) (time fuze)

The Ordnance QF 15-pounder gun, (Note: Britain traditionally denoted smaller ordnance by the maximum weight of the gun's projectile. This gun was assessed as capable of firing a projectile with a maximum weight of 15 pounds (6.8 kg), although in fact its projectiles in use weighed 14 pounds (6.4 kg).) commonly referred to as the Ehrhardt, was a modern German field gun purchased by Britain in 1900 as a stopgap measure to upgrade its field artillery to modern QF standards, while it developed its own alternative. This was precipitated by the experience of the British Army in South Africa during the Second Boer War, where its standard field gun, the BL 15-pounder, was out-performed by modern French and German field guns deployed by the Boers. It bore no relation to the BL 15-pounder or BLC 15-pounder, two other guns in British service at the time, other than a common shell.

== History ==
The gun's original design and supply to Britain included no shield, all-steel wheels, axle-tree seats, and a sprung telescoping trail to help with recoil control. The British found the trail unsatisfactory in service, so they permanently pinned it in the closed position. The British also immediately replaced the original all-steel wheels with standard British wooden spoked wheels.

It replaced the obsolete BL 12-pounder 6 cwt gun in Royal Horse Artillery service until the QF 13-pounder became available from 1904.

When the Territorial Force was formed in 1908, the guns were assigned to its cavalry units, known as Yeomanry. The axle-tree seats were removed as unnecessary because the gunners rode horses, and gun shields were added. The modified carriage was designated Mk I+.

This gun is the "15-pounder" to which writers are referring in World War I if they are referring to Royal Horse Artillery (RHA) batteries of the Territorial Force, or Yeomanry. The other "15-pounder", the BLC 15-pounder, was an unrelated gun used by Royal Field Artillery (RFA) batteries of the Territorial Force, although it was also issued to some second line RHA batteries raised in 1914.

== Combat service ==
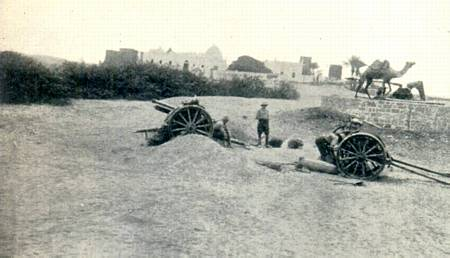
A QF 15-pounder of B Battery, Honourable Artillery Company, at Sheik Othman, Aden.

The gun was used by Royal Horse Artillery batteries of Territorial Force cavalry (Yeomanry) formations early in World War I, most notably in the campaign in Egypt against the Senussi by 1/A Battery, Honourable Artillery Company and the 1/1st Nottinghamshire Royal Horse Artillery.

B Battery, Honourable Artillery Company and Berkshire RHA were in action with these guns in the recapture of Sheikh Othman (Note: key to the water supply to Aden) from the Turks on 20 July 1915, part of the Aden campaign.

From 1916, the QF 15-pounder was replaced by the modern 13-pounders and 18-pounders.

== Ammunition ==
54,000 complete rounds (i.e. shell, fuze, cartridge) of German design and manufacture were originally supplied with the guns. These were replaced by British manufactures when used up. The following diagrams show British-made ammunition available in World War I.

Mk III Cartridge	Mk VI Shrapnel shell (1 inch G.S. fuze)	No. 65A Fuze (1 inch G.S. gauge)	Mk V Case shot	Mk I high-explosive shell with No. 101 fuze.

== See also ==
- List of field guns

== Bibliography ==
- Clarke, Dale (2004). British Artillery 1914–1919. Field Army Artillery. New Vanguard 94. Oxford UK: Osprey Publishing. ISBN 1-84176-688-7.
- Mark Connelly, The British Campaign in Aden, 1914–1918
- General Sir Martin Farndale, History of the Royal Regiment of Artillery. The Forgotten Fronts and the Home Base, 1914–1918. London: Royal Artillery Institution, 1988. ISBN 1-870114-05-1
- Hall, Major D (June 1973), "Field Artillery of the British Army 1860–1960 Part II, 1900–1914", Military History Journal, 2 (5), The South African Military History Society
- I.V. Hogg & L.F. Thurston. British Artillery Weapons & Ammunition 1914–1918. London: Ian Allan, 1972
