= BLC 15-pounder gun =

British light field gun

Ordnance BLC 15-pounder gun
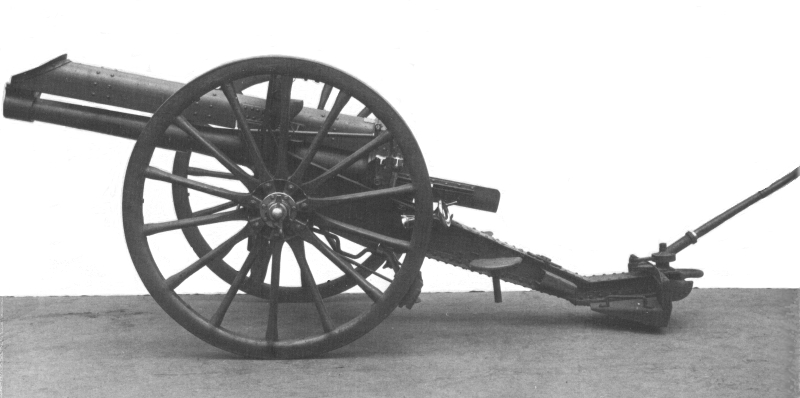
- Type: Light field gun
- Place of origin: United Kingdom

Service history
- In service: 1907–1918
- Used by: British Empire
- Wars: First World War

Production history
- No. built: 536
- Variants: Mark I, II, II*, IV

Specifications
- Mass: Gun & breech 896 lb (406 kg); Total 3,177 lb (1,441 kg)
- Barrel length: Bore 7 ft (2.134 m)
- Shell: Shrapnel, HE; 14 lb (6.35 kg)
- Calibre: 3-inch (76.2 mm)
- Breech: Single-motion interrupted screw
- Recoil: Hydro-spring, 40 inches (1.02 m)
- Carriage: Wheeled, box trail
- Elevation: -9° - 16°
- Traverse: 2° L & R
- Muzzle velocity: 1,590 ft/s (485 m/s)
- Maximum firing range: 5,750 yd (5,260 m)

The Ordnance BLC 15-pounder gun (BLC stood for BL Converted) was a modernised version of the obsolete BL 15-pounder 7 cwt gun, incorporating a recoil and recuperator mechanism above the barrel and a modified quicker-opening breech. It was developed to provide Territorial Force artillery brigades with a reasonably modern field gun without incurring the expense of equipping them with the newer 18-pounder. It is the gun that writers usually mean by "15-pounder gun" in World War I, but can be confused with the earlier Ordnance QF 15-pounder Ehrhardt or Ordnance BL 15-pounder, both of which fired the same shell.

== Design ==
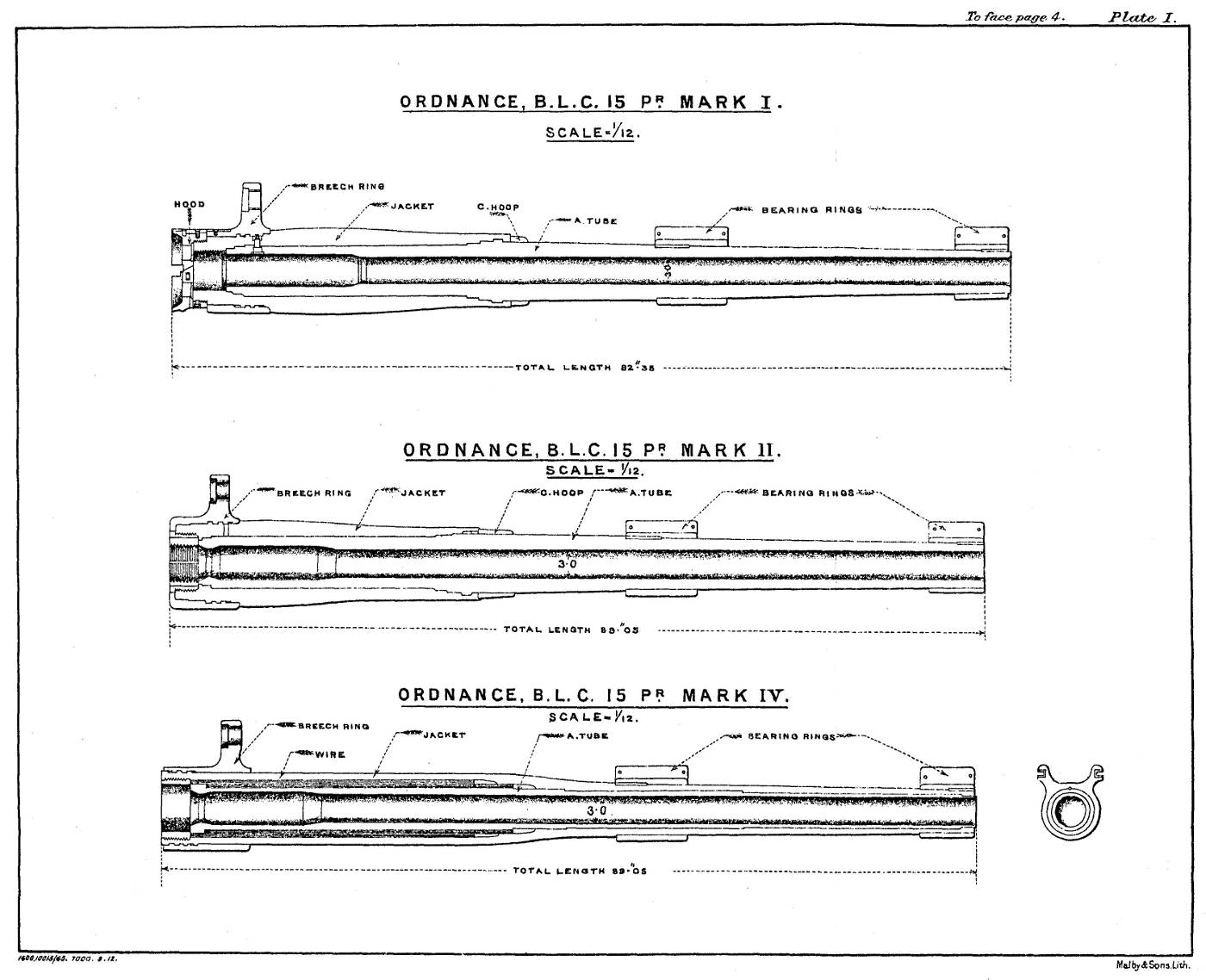
Mks I, II & IV barrel design

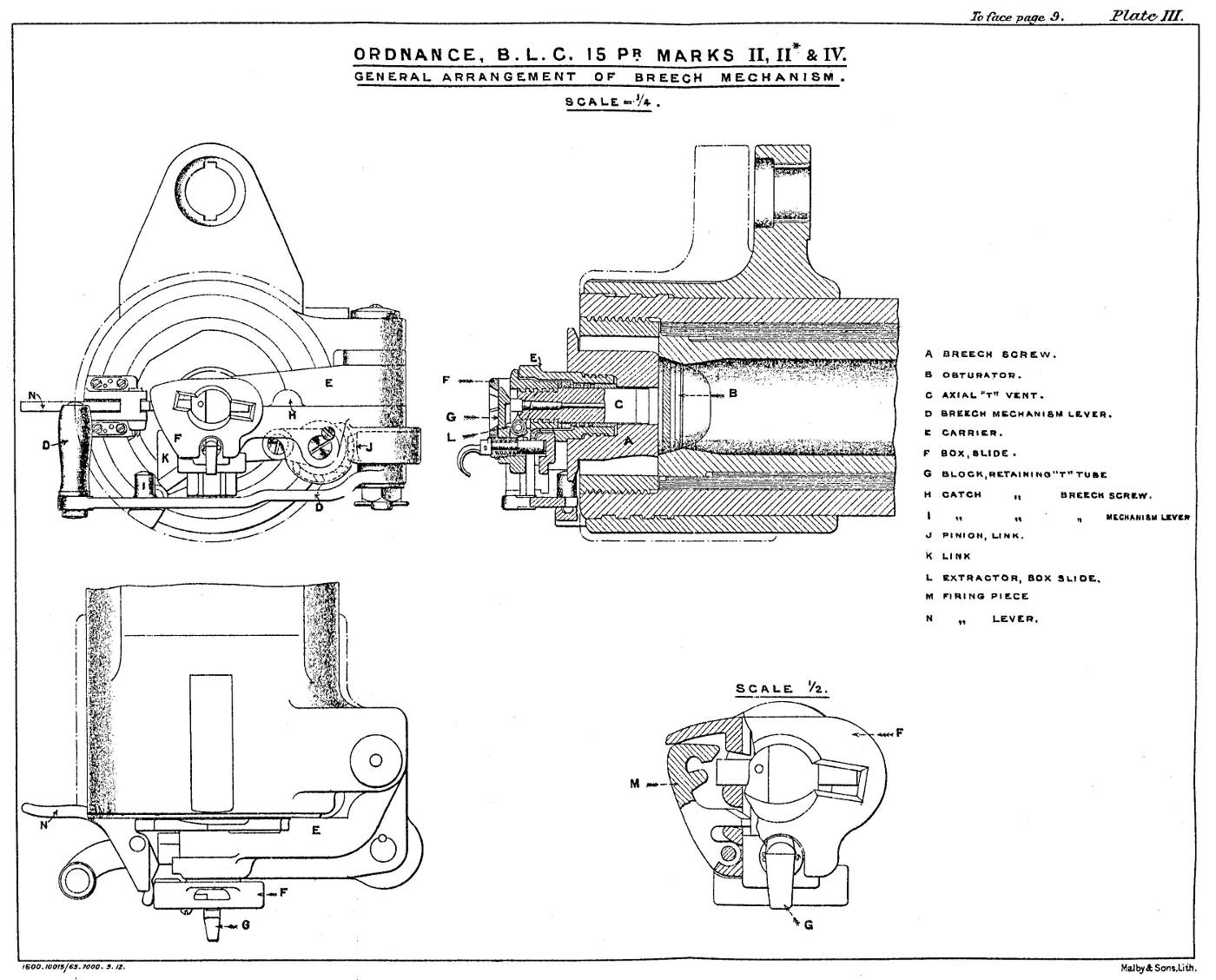
Mk II & IV single-motion breech mechanism

Many modifications were made to the old BL 15-pounder barrels to adapt them to a new carriage with a recoil buffer and recuperator above the barrel similar to the modern 13-pounder design. Previously, the barrels had been mounted directly on the carriage by trunnions. Now, the barrel was suspended from a forged-steel inverted U-shaped cradle which had trunnions to attach it to the carriage. The trunnions, sight brackets and elevating gear attachment lugs were removed from the barrel. The radial T-vent hole on top was plugged, holes in the jacket passing through the trunnion centres were sealed with screwed steel plugs, and the holes in the hood for fitting tangent sights were plugged with white metal alloy.

The 3-motion breech was replaced by a single-motion interrupted screw breech, which had an axial T vent running through it into the chamber, designed to take a T friction tube.

The new firing mechanism involved a new "push" type T friction tube, which was inserted into the axial breech vent. The crosspiece of the T was positioned pointing upwards. A long layer's guard was added to the left side of the cradle projecting behind the breech. A spring-loaded firing handle was built into the layer's guard. When cocked by pulling back and then releasing, it sprang forward and struck a firing lever on the breech, which translated the forward motion to a downward motion and propelled a firing plunger into the T of the friction tube which in turn ignited the cordite propellant charge.

In 1915, Territorial batteries guarding the east coast of England adapted their 15-pounders for use against Zeppelins, by simply digging a pit to accommodate the trail of the gun, to allow it to be trained upwards. It is unlikely that this arrangement was ever used operationally. In a more sophisticated adaptation, two 15-pounders were modified for anti-aircraft use by increasing the allowed elevation to more than 60°. These guns were installed at Ford Wynyard in Cape Town.

== Combat service ==
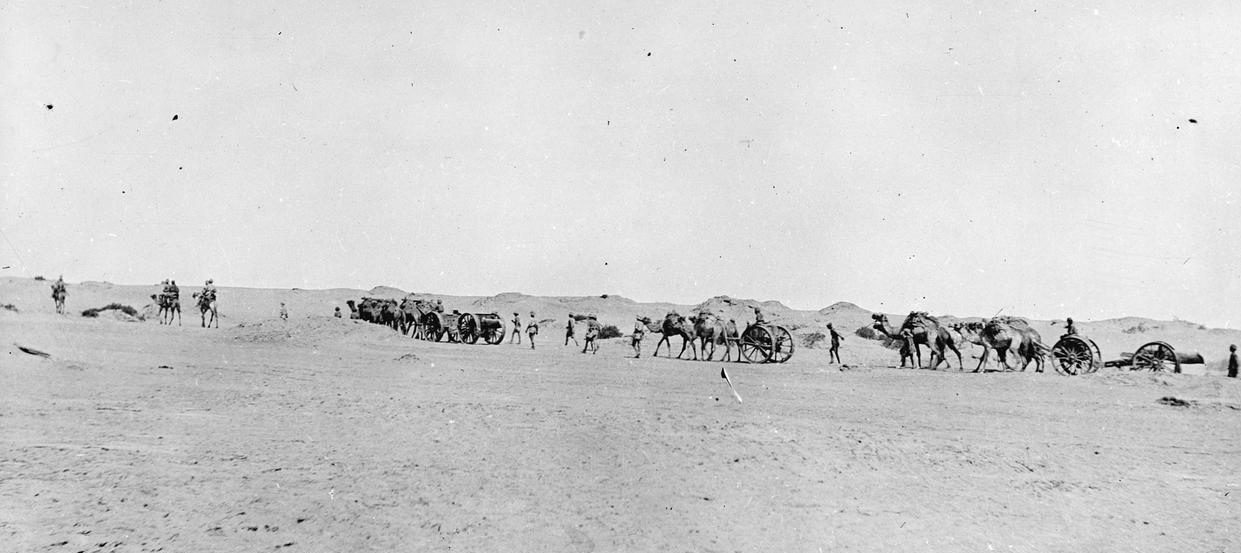
Camel Battery of BLC 15-pounders after capture of Hatum, 5 January 1918

The weapon was used by British Territorial Force and New Army in all theatres of World War I until replaced by the 18-pounder from 1916 onwards.

When skillfully utilised in the role that it was intended for – against troops in the open – the gun was still effective despite being obsolete. Where infantry avoided being caught in the open, the guns were of limited use due to their light shell.

After they became redundant, from late 1916 some were retained in fixed positions on the Western Front as anti-tank guns, freeing up modern guns for their usual duties.

Number 1 15-pounder Camel Battery RGA (today's 21 (Air Assault) Battery) served with six guns with the Indian Expeditionary Force in the Aden hinterland from 1915 to 1918 during the South Arabia campaign, to defend the important port at Aden against any Turkish advance. In July 1915, actions were fought in initially losing and then regaining the British advanced post at Sheik Othman controlling the water supply to Aden. Sgt Curtis was awarded the Distinguished Conduct Medal for saving his gun in these actions (presumably the first, in which two guns were lost). The Camel Battery was present when the British captured Hatum in January 1918.

The gun was the standard field artillery for the early South African Union Defence Force and saw action with the Cape Field Artillery at the Battle of Kakamas and Battle of Upington during the South-West Africa Campaign.

== Ammunition ==
Cordite cartridge 15¾ oz, 1907	Mk VI Shrapnel shell	No. 65A Fuze	Mk V Case shot	Mk I high-explosive shell, 1915, with No. 101 fuze	T Friction tube, Push type

== See also ==
- Ordnance BL 15-pounder: predecessor forming basis of this weapon
- List of field guns

=== Weapons of comparable role, performance and era ===
- 7.7 cm FK 96 n.A.: German equivalent: similar upgrade of an older gun
- 3-inch M1902 field gun: US equivalent

== Surviving examples ==
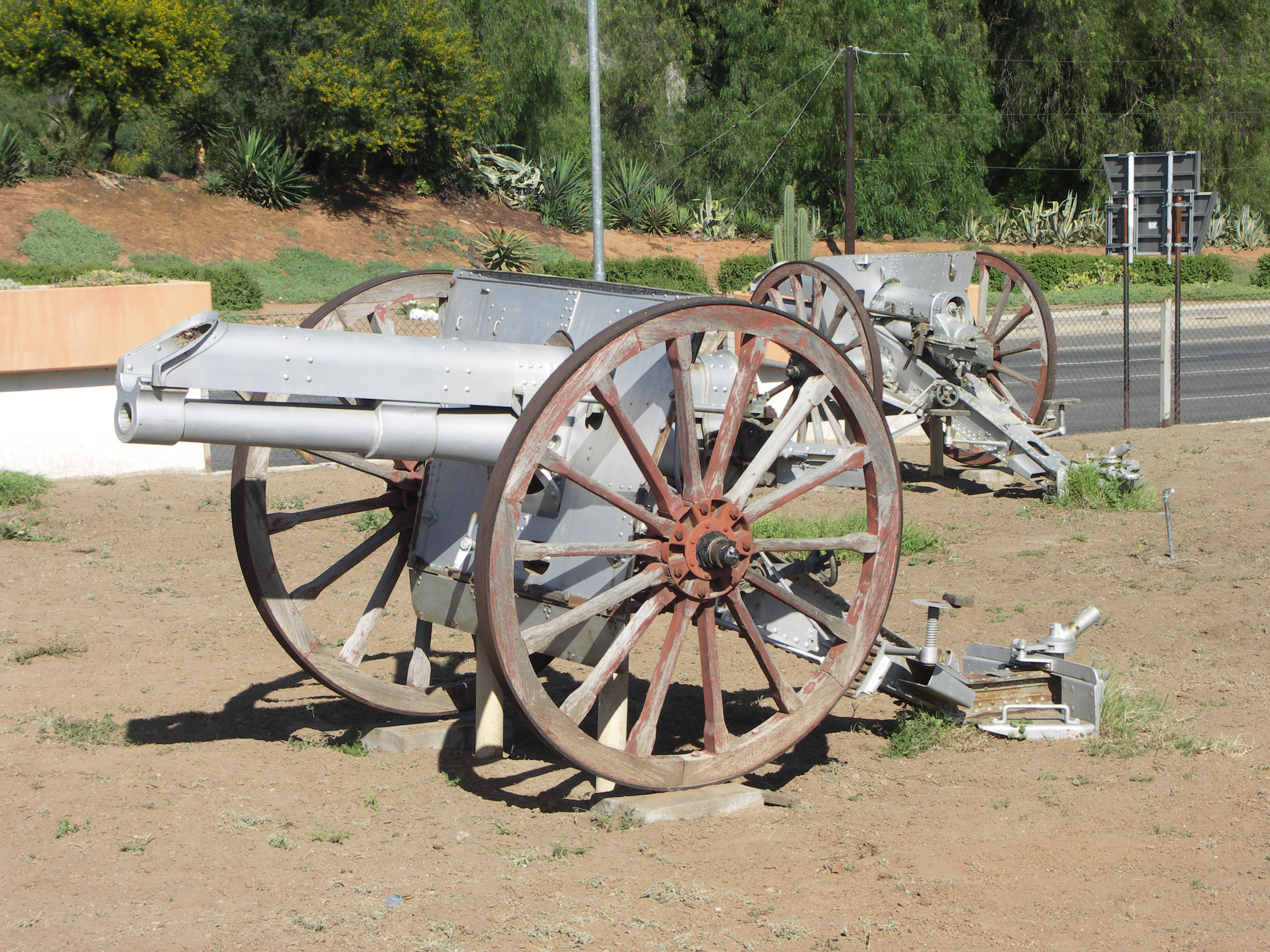
Open-air display of two surviving examples in Graaff-Reinet, South Africa

- Royal Australian Artillery Museum, North Head, Sydney, Australia
- Six guns can be found in South Africa. One gun is located in the South African National Museum of Military History, Johannesburg, two more on open-air display in Kollege Road, Graaff-Reinet and another 3 in various location throughout South Africa, including Kimberley and Cape Town

== Bibliography ==
- Dale Clarke, British Artillery 1914–1919. Field Army Artillery. Osprey Publishing, Oxford UK, 2004 ISBN 1-84176-688-7
- Colonel A. Fortescue Duguid, Official History of the Canadian Forces in the Great War 1914-1919, vol. 1. Ottawa: J. O. Patenaude, 1938.
- Mark Connelly, The British Campaign in Aden, 1914–1918. Journal of the Centre for First World War Studies, 2:1 (2005) 65–96.
- General Sir Martin Farndale, History of the Royal Regiment of Artillery. Western Front 1914–18. London: Royal Artillery Institution, 1986 ISBN 1-870114-00-0
- General Sir Martin Farndale, History of the Royal Regiment of Artillery: Forgotten Fronts and the Home Base 1914–18. London: The Royal Artillery Institution, 1988. ISBN 1-870114-05-1
- I.V. Hogg & L.F. Thurston, British Artillery Weapons & Ammunition 1914–1918. London: Ian Allan, 1972.
- Doug Knight, Guns of the Regiment. Ottawa: Service Publication, 2016.
- Colonel G. W. L. Nicholson, The Gunners of Canada: The History of The Royal Regiment of Canadian Artillery, vol. 1. Beauceville, Quebec: Imprimerie l'Éclaireur, 1967.
