= 1/1st Hertfordshire Yeomanry =

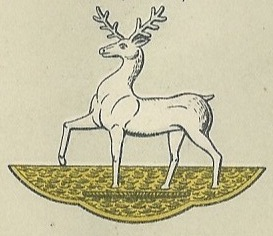
- The Hertfordshire Yeomanry badge
- Active: 31 August 1914–August 1919
- Country: United Kingdom
- Branch: Territorial Force
- Type: Yeomanry
- Role: Cavalry
- Size: 3 Squadrons
- Garrison/HQ: Yeomanry House, Hertford
- Engagements: Raid on the Suez Canal; Battle of Scimitar Hill; Senussi Campaign; Battles of Gaza; Second Battle of Kut; Capture of Baghdad; Battle of Megiddo; Battle of Sharon; Advance into Syria; North Persia

The 1/1st Hertfordshire Yeomanry was the active service unit formed by the Hertfordshire Yeomanry during World War I. It was sent to garrison Egypt and then served dismounted in the Gallipoli Campaign. On return to Egypt it was engaged in the Senussi Campaign in the Western Desert. The regiment was then split into independent squadrons acting as divisional cavalry to different infantry divisions. These served in Palestine, on the Western Front and in Mesopotamia, where one of its squadrons were the first troops to enter Baghdad. Later in the war two of the squadrons fought alongside each other in XXI Corps Cavalry Regiment during the final victory in Palestine and the advance into Syria, while the other operated with the North Persia Force and on peacekeeping duties in India.

== Mobilisation ==
On the outbreak of World War I on 4 August 1914, the Hertfordshire Yeomanry, a cavalry regiment of Britain's part-time Territorial Force (TF), had recently completed its annual training camp. The regiment mobilised under the command of Lieutenant-Colonel Abel Henry Smith at its regimental and squadron headquarters (HQs) next day:

- Regimental HQ (RHQ) at Yeomanry House, 23 St Andrew's Street, Hertford
- A Squadron at 32 Market Street, Watford
- B Squadron at Yeomanry House
- C Squadron at Ramsbury Road, St Albans
- D Squadron at 51 Salisbury Road, High Barnet

The men were billeted near the drill halls until they had been equipped and the horses requisitioned. They then set off on the two-day march to their war station at Mountnessing, Essex, to link up with Eastern Mounted Brigade to which the Herts Yeomanry was attached for peacetime training. The regiment was moved around Essex and Suffolk, finally reaching Culford, near Bury St Edmonds, on 21 August.

Under the Territorial and Reserve Forces Act 1907 that brought it into being, the TF was intended as a home defence force and its members could not be compelled to serve outside the United Kingdom. However, after the outbreak of war, TF units were invited to volunteer for Overseas Service. The Herts Yeomanry held squadron parades at Culford on 22 August where the officers and other ranks (ORs) were invited to volunteer, and more than 80 per cent of the regiment did so at once. On 31 August 1914, the War Office authorised the formation of Reserve or 2nd-Line units for each existing TF unit where 60 per cent or more of the men had volunteered. Initially these were formed from those men who had not volunteered or were unfit for overseas service, and the recruits who were flooding in. The 1st and 2nd Line units were distinguished by '1/' and '2/' prefixes. In this way duplicate units were created, mirroring those being sent overseas. Later the 2nd Line were mobilised for active service in their own right and 3rd Line units were created to supply reinforcement drafts to the 1st and 2nd Lines.

== Service ==
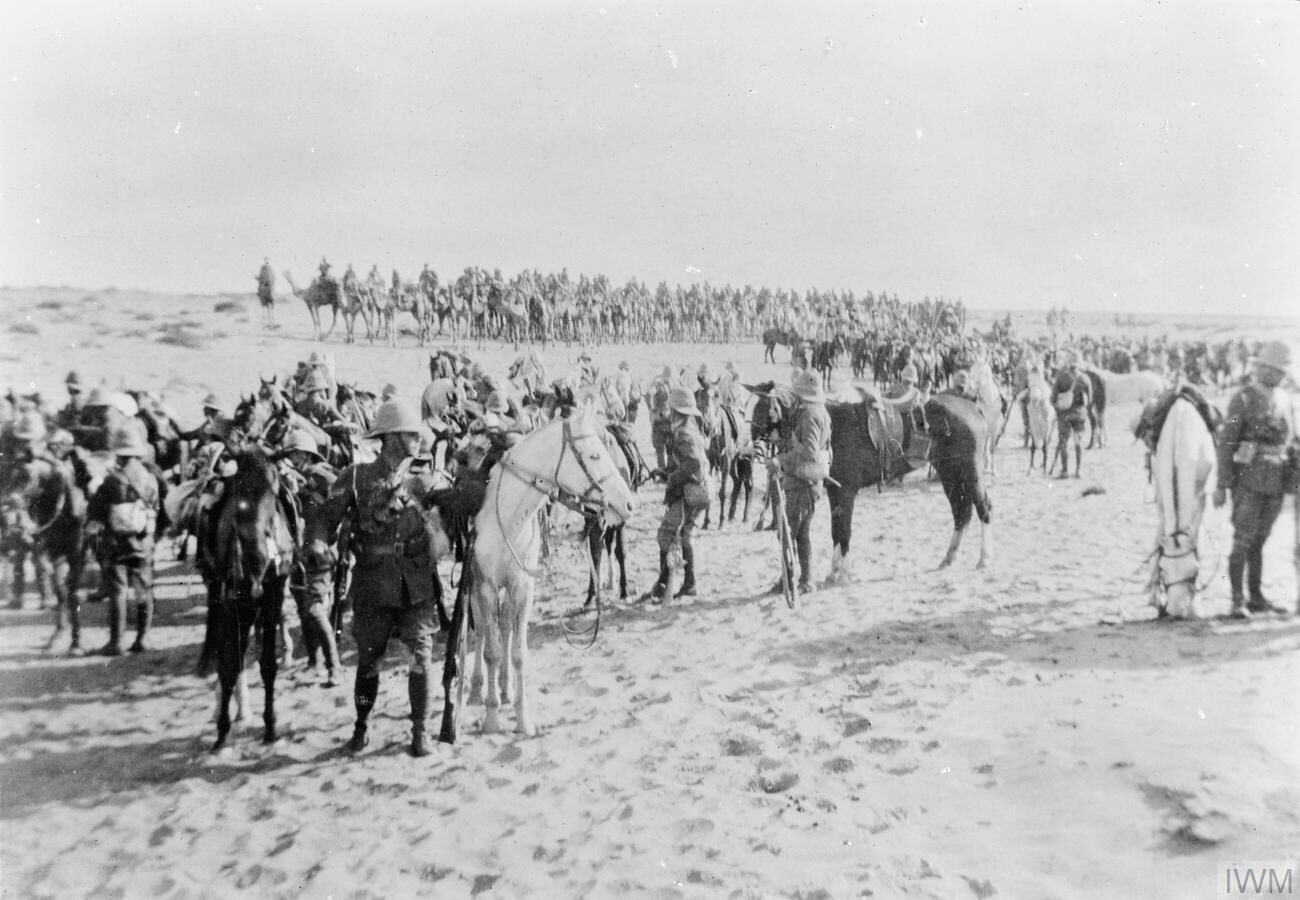
1/1st Herts Yeomanry and the Bikaner Camel Corps on the reconnaissance into the Sinai Desert February 1915.

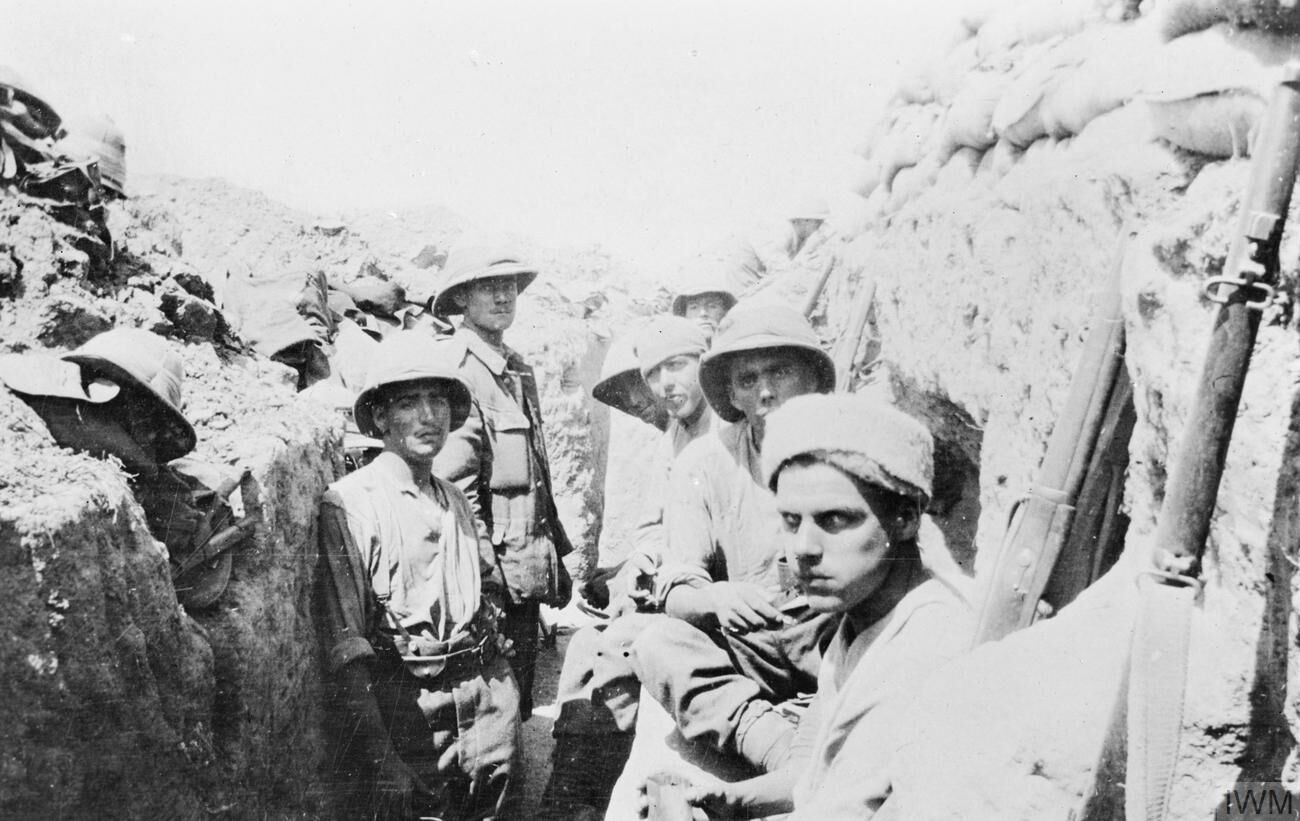

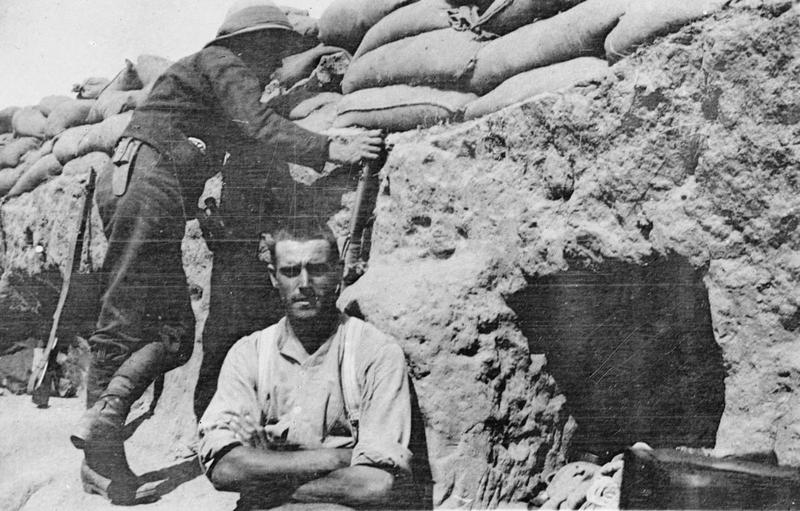
1/1st Herts Yeomanry in the Suez Canal trenches

=== Egypt ===
On 31 August the 1/1st Herts Yeomanry was warned for embarkation to Egypt. Lieutenant-Col Abel Smith was not passed medically fit for overseas service, so Colonel T.E. Harrison, DSO, retired from the Leicestershire Yeomanry, was 'dug out' to take the 1/1st Herts Yeomanry overseas. Lieutenant-Col Abel Smith took command of 2/1st Herts Yeomanry. The war establishment of a cavalry regiment was three rather than four squadrons, so C Sqn was broken up and the manpower distributed to the other three; its officer commanding, Major Reginald Halsey, formed the Regimental Depot at RHQ, but had rejoined 1/1st Herts Yeomanry before it sailed.

The regiment moved by train to Southampton where the men embarked on the SS Ionian while the horses for a single squadron were put aboard the SS Messaba. They sailed on 10 September as part of a convoy carrying the East Lancashire Division (TF) and the 1/2nd County of London Yeomanry (the Westminster Dragoons) to Egypt to relieve Regular units from the garrison for active service on the Western Front. The Ionian docked at Alexandria on 25 September and the Herts Yeomanry proceeded to Abbassia Barracks near Cairo to relieve the 3rd Dragoon Guards and take over two squadrons-worth of their horses; the Herts Yeomanry's own horses arrived two days later. The cavalry barracks at Abbassia also housed the Westminster Dragoons and A Sqn 1/1st Duke of Lancaster's Own Yeomanry (DLOY), the East Lancashires' divisional cavalry squadron. Here the yeomanry underwent training for men and horses. Colonel Harrison proved to be an alcoholic and was relieved; Maj Samuel Gurney Sheppard was promoted to succeed him in command of 1/1st Herts Yeomanry, with his brother Maj E.B. ('Ted') Sheppard as his second-in-command.

In January 1915 a Turkish force advanced to make a Raid on the Suez Canal. Its attack on 3 February was beaten off, but next day the 1/1st Herts Yeomanry, Westminster Dragoons and A Sqn DLOY were sent by train to Ismailia to form an ad hoc Yeomanry Mounted Brigade. The brigade joined the Imperial Service Cavalry Brigade and the Bikaner Camel Corps, recruited from the Princely states of India, which were reconnoitring the east bank of the canal where the Turks were retreating. This reconnaissance into the Sinai desert could not go far because of the shortage of water and had no contact with the enemy. The Herts Yeomanry spent a further two weeks at El Ferdan in the Suez Canal defences, with B Sqn detached to the ISC Brigade in the Kantara area, then returned by train to Cairo on 24 February, having gained two battle honours (Suez Canal and Egypt 1915) without firing a shot.

=== Gallipoli ===
The regiment returned to garrison duty, and supplied a number of officers and men to the various departments and staffs that were being set up: among those who left was Capt Arnold Ward, Member of Parliament for Watford, who was appointed to command a convalescent camp in Cyprus. On 9 August 1915 1/1st Herts Yeomanry received a warning order to prepare to sail to Gallipoli as reinforcements for the bogged-down Dardanelles Campaign. Together with the Westminster Dragoons in the former Yeomanry Mounted Brigade (redesignated as the 5th Mounted Brigade) they were to be attached to the 2nd Mounted Division – all operating dismounted in the infantry role. Each regiment left the equivalent of a squadron HQ and two Troops to look after the horses, and on 14 August the 1/1st Herts Yeomanry embarked on HMS Knight Templar at Alexandria. It arrived on 17 August at Lemnos, where it left behind a further party at the base at Mudros with the regimental transport It then trans-shipped to the SS Queen Victoria, which ferried the regiment to Suvla Bay, where a fresh landing had been made on 6 August. The regiment landed after dark and spent the next two days building dugouts and roads. On 21 August the 2nd Mtd Division was in reserve for the Battle of Scimitar Hill. The Yeomanry moved out of their bivouacs at Lala Baba at 15.30 towards Chocolate Hill, expecting then to pass through the attacking 29th Division on Scimitar Hill to secure the final objective. However, after two gallant attempts to take Scimitar Hill, 29th Division's attack had died out by 17.00 and the Yeomanry came under heavy converging fire as they crossed the salt lake and approached Chocolate Hill. The Herts Yeomanry lost their CO, Lt-Col Gurney Sheppard, who was killed, and about 40 ORs, of whom 11 died. 5th Mounted Bde stayed in reserve on Chocolate Hill while the rest of 2nd Mtd Division made another disastrous attack on Scimitar Hill. After this had failed, the division was withdrawn after dark to Lala Baba. Major Halsey took over temporary command of 1/1st Herts Yeomanry until Maj Ted Sheppard could be summoned from Egypt. After a day's rest the regiment went up the following night to take over defence of the trenches forward of Chocolate Hill, where it remained until 28 August.

Even at full strength a cavalry regiment was considerably smaller than an infantry battalion, and after detaching horse and transport parties at Abbassia and Lemnos, and then the casualties at Scimitar Hill, the yeomanry regiments were deemed too small to be effective and the brigades had to be reformed as composite battalions. 1/1st Herts Yeomanry and the Westminster Dragoons were temporarily combined under Lt-Col Ted Sheppard as 5th Yeomanry Regiment in 1st Composite Mounted Brigade. The regiment continued to suffer a trickle of casualties from Trench warfare and sickness, and when it was pulled out of the front line into reserve on 25 September the Herts Yeomanry contingent was down to fewer than 160 men. On 29 September Lt-Col Sheppard reported that he had only 44 men fit for digging. Nevertheless, they carried out one more tour of duty in the line from 8 to 20 October, even though the combined regiment amounted to less than a squadron and was absorbed into the 2nd Yeomanry Regiment (Buckinghamshire, Dorset and Berkshire Yeomanry). On 31 October, the remnant of 5th Mtd Bde was evacuated to Mudros for rest. Together with the transport party and a draft of 52 men from home, the total strength of the Herts Yeomanry on the island was 10 officers and 158 ORs. This composite squadron trained for a return to the front, but the decision had been made to evacuate Suvla, and on 27 November 1/1st Herts Yeomanry embarked on HMS Hannibal for Egypt. The regiment had lost its CO and 23 men killed or died of wounds or disease, and many more had been evacuated sick. It received the battle honours Gallipoli 1915, Suvla and Scimitar Hill.

=== Senussi campaign ===
The 1/1st Herts Yeomanry disembarked at Alexandria on 28 November and went to Mena Camp, near Cairo, where it rejoined its rear party with the horses. Meanwhile, fighting had broken out in the Western Desert when the Senussi attacked Sollum, and a Western Frontier Force (WFF) was being formed to deal with the situation. This included a Composite Mounted Bde with detachments from some 20 different yeomanry regiments. 1/1st Herts Yeomanry moved to Mex Camp outside Alexandria where it was able to reform two mounted squadrons. B Squadron under Maj de Falbe entrained on 9 December for the WFF's railhead at Dabaa. The squadron was then pushed ahead to guard and patrol round the wells at Abu Gerab, one of only three watering points along the WFF's 85 miles (137 km) line of communications (LoC) between Dabaa and its forward base at Mersa Matruh. Regimental HQ, A Sqn and the Machine Gun Section followed on 10 December and took up similar duty at Dabaaa itself. By 23 December B Sqn had been moved up to strengthen the garrison of Mersa Matruh, where air reconnaissance showed a Senussi concentration about 6 miles (9.7 km) to the south-west.

On 25 December the WFF sent out a force to surprise them by a night advance (the Affair of the Wadi Masjid). The left column under HQ Composite Yeomanry Bde was entirely mounted to move fast round the enemy flank. B Sqn 1/1st Herts Yeomanry was detailed to escort 1/1st Nottinghamshire Royal Horse Artillery in the rear of the column. Although the left column emerged from the Wadi Toweiwia at 07.30, it took another two hours to get the horse artillery's guns and ammunition limbers up the wadi, by which time the rest of the column was 10 miles (16 km) ahead. Instead, B Sqn was ordered to move over and guard the left flank of the right column, whose infantry were pushing the enemy back across the Wadi Masjid. However, the bulk of the Senussis escaped because the left column was held up by rearguards and could not cut them off. The action was called off when darkness fell at 16.00, and the cavalry returned to Matruh, B Sqn having covered about 50 miles (80 km) in the day.

After a period of bad weather the WFF attacked the Senussis again 25 miles (40 km)south-west of Matruh, on 23 January 1916 (the Affair of Halazin). A composite mounted force (2 Trps Herts Yeomanry, 2 Trps DLOY and 2 Trps Surrey Yeomanry) went out as advance guard to the infantry column, and then took up position as the right flank guard when the action began. There was no cover, and after 45 minutes' dismounted firing the flank guard had to fall back in the face of superior numbers. However, the infantry had stormed the enemy camp and the Senussis fled. Once again night was falling and the horses were too exhausted for a successful pursuit.

Meanwhile, RHQ and A Sqn had continued at Dabaa as part of a composite regiment with the Westminster Dragoons. On 10 January they were ordered back 75 miles (121 km) to El Hammam to carry out patrols in support of intelligence gathering, and then on 29 January they escorted a large supply convoy to Mersa Matruh, where they rejoined B Sqn. A draft of 53 men arrived on 5 February, and the regiment was able to reform D Sqn. However, the Composite Mounted Bde was broken up on 20 February, before the WFF's decisive battle at the Action of Agagia, and the regiment returned to Alexandria, the march taking until 6 March. On arrival at Alexandria the regiment was split up to provide divisional cavalry squadrons to the infantry divisions evacuated from Gallipoli:

- Regimental HQ with A Sqn and the MG Section were attached to 54th (East Anglian) Division
- B Squadron was attached to 11th (Northern) Division
- D Squadron was attached to 13th (Western) Division

=== A Squadron ===
A Squadron under Maj Hugh Wyld, together with RHQ and the MG Section, joined 54th (EA) Division at Mena Camp, and in April moved with it into the southern part of the Suez Canal defences. On 19 September RHQ was disbanded (Lt-Col Sheppard went home to command 2/1st North Somerset Yeomanry) but A Sqn continued to serve with 54th (EA) Division. From 13 to 20 September it accompanied a raid into the Sinai Desert, and thereafter carried out regular patrols. Meanwhile, in the north the EEF was pushing forwards, and in February 1917 54th (EA) Division joined the concentration for the advance into Palestine. A Squadron's transport was replaced by camels. In March 1917, 1/1st Herts Yeomanry's MG Section left to join 16th MG Sqn in 5th Mtd Bde, and the men were subsequently transferred to the Machine Gun Corps.

The First Battle of Gaza was launched on 26 March. A Squadron led 54th (EA) Division across the Wadi Ghuzzee and rode on to occupy part of the Sheikh Abbas ridge and hold it until the infantry arrived. Its advance through the coastal fog was unopposed, and once relieved on the ridge at noon the squadron patrolled the divisional flank without contacting the enemy. However, the attack on Gaza itself had miscarried, and the force was withdrawn to the Wadi Ghuzzee at nightfall. A second attempt (the Second Battle of Gaza) began on 17 April. In the interval A Sqn provided escorts for reconnaissances of the Turkish positions and held an outpost line halfway between Wadi Ghuzzee and Sheikh Abbas. It was withdrawn the night before the battle, and was in reserve when 54th (EA) Division made a frontal attack with heavy losses on 19 April; the advance was called off. After the failures at Gaza, the Egyptian Expeditionary Force (EEF) was reorganised under the command of General Sir Edmund Allenby. New corps HQs were created, and divisional cavalry squadrons were consolidated into corps cavalry regiments. In August 1917 A Sqn 1/1st Herts Yeomanry joined XXI Corps Cavalry Regiment (see below).

=== B Squadron ===
B Squadron joined 11th (N) Division at El Ferdan. On 27 June 1916 it sailed from Alexandria accompanying the division to the Western Front, where divisional cavalry squadrons had already been consolidated into corps regiments. On 12 July the squadron joined VI Corps Cavalry Regiment, until early in 1917 when it moved to join XVIII Corps Cavalry Regiment. The squadron never served in the front line trenches, or got an opportunity to use its mobility. In July 1917 B Sqn returned to Egypt, where it served as the depot squadron in the Cavalry Wing of the Imperial School of Instruction at Zeitoun. However, in May 1918 it joined A Sqn in XXI Corps Cavalry in Palestine (see below).

=== XXI Corps Cavalry ===
XXI Corps' formation sign.

A Squadron 1/1st Herts Yeomanry joined XXI Corps Cavalry Regiment on 26 August 1917. The other two squadrons of the regiment were A Sqn 1/1st DOLY, transferred from 53rd (Welsh) Division, and C Sqn 1/1st Queen's Own Royal Glasgow Yeomanry (QORGY) from 52nd (Lowland) Division. These squadrons had recently been strengthened by the issue of Hotchkiss machine guns at a scale of one per Troop.

When the offensive was renewed on 31 October (the Third Battle of Gaza), XXI Corps carried out a holding action against Gaza while the rest of the EEF swept round the flank. When the Turks evacuated Gaza on 6/7 November, XXI Corps was launched in pursuit, with A Sqn Herts Yeomanry and C Sqn QORGY leading the Imperial Service Cavalry Brigade in the Capture of Wadi el Hesi and Junction Station. It was also engaged at the Battles of Jaffa and Tell 'Asur.

In May 1918 B Sqn 1/1st Herts Yeomanry arrived from Egypt and replaced C Sqn 1/1st QORGY in XXI Corps Cavalry Rgt. (Note: With two squadrons of the regiment present, the Hertfordshire Yeomanry was eligible for the battle honours awarded for the rest of the campaign: Palestine 1918, Megiddo, Sharon and Damascus, the latter covering the advance into Syria.) XXI Corps Cavalry Rgt fought in the final Battle of Megiddo, leading the pursuit after XXI Corps broke through the Turkish lines at the Battle of Sharon. The regiment, then carried out an epic march up the coast of Ottoman Syria (modern Lebanon) to liberate the ports.

Hostilities in the theatre ended on 31 October when the Armistice of Mudros came into force. Demobilisation of XXI Corps Cavalry Rgt began in mdi-January 1919. However, in early February A and B Sqns Herts Yeomanry were selected to form part of the Army of Occupation in Turkey. They returned to Beirut in mid-April and amalgamated as a composite squadron. XXI Corps Cavalry Regiment continued to decline in numbers as demobilisation proceeded, and it was formally disbanded on 25 July 1919.

=== D Squadron ===
D Squadron was assigned to 13th (Western) Division, which was already en route to the Mesopotamian Front. The squadron entrained under Maj Halsey for Suez, where it embarked on HM Troopship Campanello and sailed on 29 March 1916 via Aden to the Shatt al-Arab, arriving on 13 April. It then transhipped to river steamers and reached Basra on 15 April. 13th (W) Division had been sent up the Tigris to the front line, fighting in the last failed attempt to break the Siege of Kut. After the fall of Kut on 29 April the front became static and D Sqn was kept back for duties on the LoCs, mainly working in the Remount Depot at Amarah. By June the squadron was down to half strength due to sickness, and it was not until mid-November that a 72-strong reinforcement draft arrived from the training regiment at home, when Maj A.C.W. ('Archie') Clayton took over command.

==== Second Battle of Kut ====
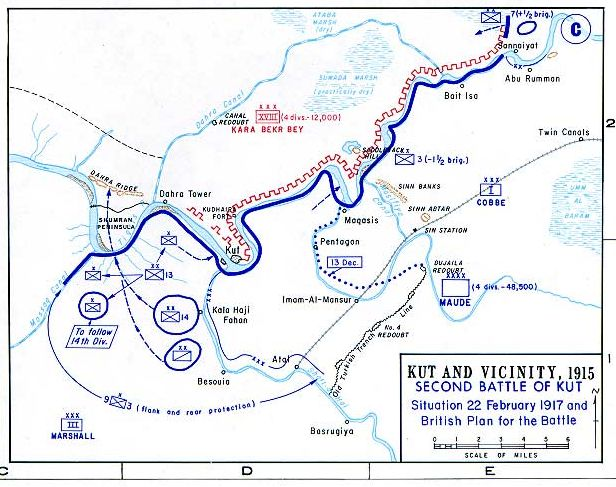
The Second Battle of Kut.

Active operations on the Tigris resumed on 13 December and next day the squadron embarked on river steamers to rejoin 13th (W) Division at Sheikh Sa'ad. However, on 1 January 1917 it joined |III (Tigris) Corps Cavalry Regiment, the rest of the composite regiment consisting of one sqn 10th Lancers, two sqns 32nd Lancers (both Indian Army regiments) and a two-gun section of Royal Horse Artillery. At first the regiment's role was to carry out reconnaissances and to maintain security of III (Tigris) Corps' open left flank and rear, during which flocks of sheep and goats were rounded up. Operations to reduce the Hai Salient began on 25 January 1917. This involved a series of deliberate infantry attacks during which III (Tigris) Corps Cavalry rode out into the desert on the western flank and engaged targets of opportunity with the guns. The four squadrons took turns in the roles of advance guard, flank guard, artillery escort, and escort to prisoners going to the rear. For part of the time D Sqn Herts Yeomanry was attached to the Cavalry Division raiding enemy villages up to 20 miles (32 km) distant. On 7 February one of these raids led to a sharp action for D Sqn acting as advance guard. Operations to clear the Dahra Bend began on 9 February: once again III (Tigris) Corps Cavalry was to operate on the outer flank while the Cavalry Division created a diversion, and then together they were to hem in the Turks and prevent their withdrawal across the Tigris. However, moving towards the Shumran Bend the regiment found itself facing entrenched Turkish infantry and could make little progress. III (Tigris) Corps secured the Dahra Bend on 15 February.

III (Tigris) Corps launched the Second Battle of Kut on 23 February with an assault crossing of the Tigris, securing the Shumran Peninsula and establishing a bridge across the Shumran Bend. Kut was now almost isolated, and the Turks evacuated it on 25 February. III (Tigris) Corps Cavalry crossed the bridge and D Sqn Herts Yeomanry acted as advance guard for the pursuit by 38th Brigade of 13th (W) Division. The Yeomanry pursued along the river bank with the British gunboats alongside. After about 5 miles (8.0 km) they came across the main body of retreating Turks, and a battery of LXVI Brigade Royal Field Artillery came into action, while the Herts Yeomanry dismounted and advanced in extended order under shellfire, driving the Turkish rearguard from one nullah to another. The infantry caught up later and the squadron rejoined its horses after dark. Next day the squadron deployed as advance and right flank guard to 14th Indian Division advancing over the open ground furthest from the river. They watched the entire Turkish column marching away (one squadron of III (Tigris) Corps Cavalry did attempt to engage the stragglers but was driven off my machine gun fire). On 27 February D Sqn was again with 14th Indian Division, which advanced about 10 miles (16 km) and then halted to await supplies. The advance was not resumed until 1 March, when III (Tigris) Corps Cavalry rode about 40 miles (64 km) in rounding up sheep for food, while D Sqn acted as flank guard and grazed its horses. The next days advance was only 3 miles (4.8 km) while D Sqn and two troops of Indian Cavalry rounded up more sheep.

==== Capture of Baghdad ====
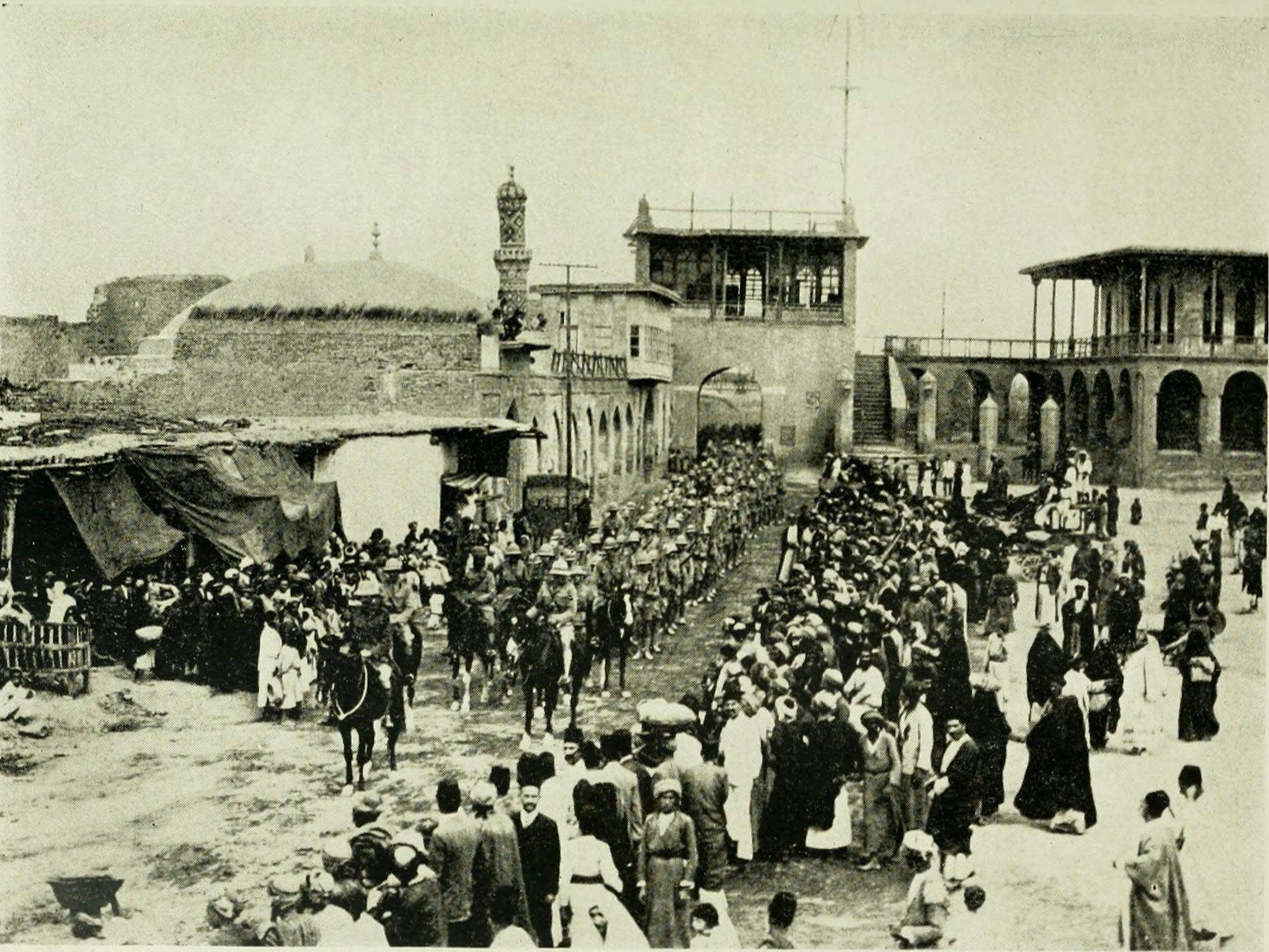
Lt-Gen Sir Stanley Maude enters Baghdad

III (Tigris) Corps Cavalry Regiment was officially broken up on 3 March and D Sqn reverted to its role as 13th (W) Division's divisional cavalry for its final advance on Baghdad. This began on 5 March after supply boats had arrived. The division advanced up the river with D Sqn protecting its outer flank, reaching Ctesiphon on 6 March. After the squadron spent a day reconnoitring crossing points on the Diyala River the division's attempts to cross on the nights of 7/8 and 8/9 March were failures. The third attempt on 9/10 March was successful, and a bridge was laid on 10 March, enabling the leading elements of 13th Division to cross by midday. D Squadron and a squadron of 32nd Cavalry led the advance guard, with orders to catch up with the Turkish rearguard and establish where their next stand would be made. This proved to be about 5 miles (8.0 km) from Baghdad, and the following infantry were unable to outflank the position before nightfall. However, during the night it became apparent that the Turks had evacuated the position, and at dawn on 11 March D Sqn set off with orders to reconnoitre as far into the city as possible. Advancing through date gardens the squadron entered the city without opposition to find it evacuated by Turkish troops and being looted by Arabs. The yeomanry cleared the looters out of the citadel to secure the remaining arms and ammunition there. An infantry patrol from 1/5th Battalion The Buffs then arrived, having crossed from the other bank of the Tigris by local boats. Together the two small units held an impromptu flag-raising ceremony at the citadel. Shortly afterwards 6th Bn King's Own led 13th (W) Division into the city.

The Capture of Baghdad was the culmination of the campaign, but there were still operations to ensure its defence. Columns moved up alongside the Tigris, with D Sqn leading 40th Bde of 13th (W) Division in a forward reconnaissance towards the Shatt al Adhaim. When the whole of 13th (W) Division had closed up for the attack, D Sqn switched to 39th Bde on the flank for the 'Affair of Dogame' or 'Duqma' on 29 March. Together with some armoured cars the yeomanry protected the brigade's flank while it carried out its attack in two phases and turned the Turks out of their positions. For the attack on the Adhaim 13th (W) Division was given a composite cavalry brigade under Col R.A. Cassels of the 32nd Cavalry comprising 21st Prince Albert Victor's Own Cavalry, two sqns 32nd Cavalry, and D Sqn Herts Yeomanry. On 7 April Cassels' Column cleared the ground up to the Adhaim and began reconnoitring bridging sites, but the attack was delayed until the night of 17/18 April due to the need to counter a Turkish threat to the flank from the Jebel Hamrin. Cassels' column carried out a feint during the assault crossing, and then a pursuit of the retreating Turks. D Squadron then reverted to 13th (W) Division, escorting the artillery that supported troops on the other side of the Tigris into Samarra on 23 April. The following evening D Sqn followed the infantry across the Adhaim, but the Turks withdrew that night and over the following days the force advanced by easy stages up the river, D Sqn accompanying 7th Indian Cavalry Brigade, until they reached the enemy's next entrenched position on 29 April. D Squadron acted as flank guard during next day's 'Affairs on the Shatt el Adhaim', after which the Turks withdrew into the Jebel Hamrin.

==== Euphrates Front ====
Active operations were closed down during the heat of summer, and the squadron only did one or two patrols a week. On 6 August 1917 D Sqn was transferred to 15th Indian Division at Baghdad. The emphasis of the Mesopotamian Expeditionary Force (MEF) now shifted to the Euphrates front. In September, 15th Indian Division was ordered to occupy Ramadi, west of Baghdad, but D Sqn did not participate in the expedition, probably because of a shortage of fit horses and the availability of aircraft for distant reconnaissance. The squadron rejoined the division at Ramadi on 25 October and resumed patrolling.

As the winter rains ended in early 1918, 15th Indian Division was ordered to prepare a movement on Hit. A reconnoitring force was formed on 18 February under Brigadier-General F.G. Lucas of 42nd Indian Brigade, the cavalry element of which consisted of D Sqn and two squadrons of 10th Lancers, commanded by Maj Clayton of the Herts Yeomanry. The reconnaissance took two weeks, during which D Sqn fought an action on 21 February in which it brushed past the Turkish cavalry outposts and overran an infantry picquet. Having identified the main Turkish position behind Hit, 'Clayton's Composite Regiment' maintained contact by constant patrolling until 8 March, when the Turks began to withdraw. The following day the unit negotiated the abandoned Turkish trenches and barbed wire to occupy Hit. 15th Indian Division then moved on the Turks' new position at Khan al Baghdadi, 20 miles (32 km) further up the Euphrates. D Squadron was attached to the reserve brigade during the 'Action of Khan Baghdadi' on 26 March and took little part. However, next day Clayton's Composite Regiment was sent up to follow the cavalry pursuit of the beaten enemy, and was engaged in 'mopping up' Turkish stragglers and securing prisoners. D Squadron returned to camp at Ramadi on 7 April.

==== North Persia and India ====
The squadron left 15th Indian Division in May 1918 and was tasked with LoC duties for the North Persia Force. This force was stationed on the southern shore of the Caspian Sea, some 300 miles (480 km) from Baghdad and the road between had to be maintained and guarded. The squadron went by train and a three-day march with camel transport to establish a base at Kasr-i-Shirin on the border between Mesopotamian Kurdistan and Persia. Major Clayton was put in command of an 80 miles (130 km) section of the route, with a small force of infantry and cavalry. Despite the proximity of hostile tribes, and thousands of Armenian refugees using the route, the main problem for the force was sickness.

Hostilities with Turkey ended with the Armistice of Mudros on 31 October 1918. D Squadron was withdrawn from Kasr-i-Shirin on 4 December, marching to the railhead to entrain for Kut, and then travel by boat to the MEF's main base at Amara. At the end of February 1919 two officers and 76 ORs left for Basra to be shipped home for demobilisation. At the end of March the rest of the squadron (two officers and 67 ORs, leaving behind a handful of men still liable for service with the occupation forces) went to Basra and on 3 April embarked for Bombay as the intended first stage of the journey home. However, rioting had broken out in several part of India, and on 20 April Maj Clayton was ordered to assemble some 600 men from 50 different units (including D Sqn) at Deolali transit camp. This unit, known as 12th Composite Battalion with Clayton promoted to command it with the rank of lieutenant-colonel, was sent to Calcutta as part of a peacekeeping force. It was not engaged in any clashes, but was retained at Fort William until August 1919, when it was relieved and the men, including those of D Squadron, returned via Deolali to Bombay. There they embarked for home and final demobilisation.

== See also ==
- Hertfordshire Yeomanry
- XXI Corps Cavalry Regiment
