= Yeomanry Mounted Brigade =

Yeomanry Mounted Brigade 5th Mounted Brigade 5th Yeomanry Regiment
- Active: January 1915–March 1916
- Country: United Kingdom
- Branch: British Army
- Type: Yeomanry
- Size: Brigade
- Engagements: World War I Gallipoli 1915 Egypt 1916

The Yeomanry Mounted Brigade was a formation of the Territorial Force of the British Army, raised in January 1915 during the First World War. After service in the Gallipoli Campaign and with the Western Frontier Force in World War I, it was broken up in March 1916.

== Formation history ==
The Yeomanry Mounted Brigade was formed in Egypt on 19 January 1915. It commanded the 1/1st Hertfordshire Yeomanry and the 1/2nd County of London Yeomanry (Westminster Dragoons) which had arrived in Egypt on 25 September 1914. Brig-Gen J.D.T. Tyndale-Biscoe was appointed to command.

It joined the 2nd Mounted Division on 13 August and was dismounted to take part in the Gallipoli Campaign. Each regiment left a squadron headquarters and two troops (about 100 officers and men) in Egypt to look after the horses. While with the 2nd Mounted Division, the brigade was designated as 5th Mounted Brigade.

=== Gallipoli ===
The brigade landed at "A" Beach, Suvla Bay on the night of 17 August and moved into reserve positions at Lala Baba on the night of 20 August. On 21 August it advanced to Chocolate Hill and was in reserve for the attacks on Scimitar Hill and Hill 112.

Due to losses during the Battle of Scimitar Hill and wastage during August 1915, the 2nd Mounted Division had to be reorganised. On 4 September 1915, the 1st Composite Mounted Brigade was formed from 1st (1st South Midland), 2nd (2nd South Midland) and 5th (Yeomanry) Mounted Brigades. Each dismounted brigade formed a battalion sized unit, hence 5th Yeomanry Regiment.

=== Egypt ===
5th Yeomanry Regiment left Suvla on 31 October 1915 for Mudros. It left Mudros on 27 November, arrived Alexandria on 1 December and went to Mena Camp, Cairo. The brigade left the 2nd Mounted Division on 7 December, was reformed and remounted, and joined the Western Frontier Force. By March 1916, the brigade had been broken up as the Hertfordshire Yeomanry was split up as divisional cavalry and the 2nd County of London Yeomanry was attached to the 6th Mounted Brigade, still in the Western Frontier Force.

== Commanders ==
The Yeomanry Mounted Brigade / 5th Mounted Brigade had the following commanders:

From	Rank	Name
19 January 1915	Brigadier General	J.D.T. Tyndale-Biscoe (until 4 September 1915)
1 December 1915	Lieutenant-Colonel	T.M.S. Pitt (acting)

== See also ==
- British yeomanry during the First World War

== Bibliography ==
- Becke, Archibald F. (1936). Order of Battle of Divisions Part 2A. The Territorial Force Mounted Divisions and the 1st-Line Territorial Force Divisions (42–56). London: HMSO. OCLC 4405016.
- James, Brigadier E.A. (1978). British Regiments 1914–18. London: Samson Books Limited. ISBN 0-906304-03-2.
- Westlake, Ray (1996). British Regiments at Gallipoli. Barnsley: Leo Cooper. ISBN 0-85052-511-X.
