= List of corps cavalry regiments of the British Army 1916–19 =

This list includes cavalry regiments assigned to Corps of the British Army in the period 1916–19. On the outbreak of World War I the establishment of a British infantry division included a cavalry squadron for reconnaissance and escort duties. From 1915 these were primarily provided by mounted units of the Special Reserve or Yeomanry regiments of the Territorial Force. Early in 1916 the divisional cavalry squadrons were transferred to Army Corps level and formed into composite regiments. However, Trench warfare conditions on the Western Front reduced the utility of mounted troops, and in 1917 most of the corps cavalry regiments were dismounted and drafted as infantry reinforcements, converted into corps cyclist battalions or machine gun battalions. A few were reinstated (at squadron strength) during 1918. On the other fighting fronts corps cavalry units continued until demobilisation in 1919. The corps cavalry units formed during the war were as follows:

- Cavalry Corps Troops: B Squadron 1/1st Hampshire Yeomanry (Carabiniers) (5 September 1916 – 19 January 1917); 1/1st Yorkshire Dragoons (October –6 December 1917)
- I Corps Cavalry Regiment: 1st South Irish Horse (SIH) (May 1916–August 1917); B Sqn 1st King Edward's Horse (KEH) (from May 1918)
- II Corps Cavalry Regiment: 1/1st Yorks Dragoons 12 May 1916–October 1917) – transferred to Cavalry Corps; returned as II Corps Cyclist Battalion (from 16 March 1918)
- III Corps Cavalry Regiment: Regimental Headquarters (RHQ) and D Sqn 1/1st Royal Wiltshire Yeomanry (RWY) (11–20 May 1916); RHQ, C & D Sqns 1/1st Duke of Lancaster's Own Yeomanry (DLOY), C Sqn 1/1st Surrey Yeomanry (May 1916–24 July 1917); C Sqn 1st KEH (from October 1918)
- III (Tigris) Corps Cavalry Regiment: D Sqn 1/1st Hertfordshire Yeomanry, 1 Sqn 10th Lancers, 2 Sqns 32nd Lancers (2 January–4 March 1917)
- IV Corps Cavalry Regiment: 1st KEH (1 June 1916 – 17 July 1917; November–15 December 1917); 1/1st Northumberland Hussars (December 1917–8 October 1918)
- V Corps Cavalry Regiment: RHQ, A & B Sqns 1/1st Queen's Own Royal Glasgow Yeomanry (QORGY), B Sqn 1/1st Lothians and Border Horse (LYBH) (May 1916–June 1917); XIX Corps Cavalry Regiment transferred (7 September 1917) – converted to V Corps Cyclist Battalion (March 1918)
- VI Corps Cavalry Regiment: 1/1st Northamptonshire Yeomanry (May 1916–summer 1917); B Sqn Herts Yeomanry (12 July 1916–early 1917) – transferred to VIII Corps Cavalry Rgt
- VII Corps Cavalry Regiment: 1st North Irish Horse (NIH) (10 May 1916 – 16 July 1917) – redesignated XIX Corps Cavalry Rgt
- VIII Corps Cavalry Regiment: 1/1st Lancashire Hussars (May 1916–July 1917); B Sqn Herts Yeomanry (27 May–6 July 1917) – transferred to Egypt, then XXI Corps Cavalry Rgt
- IX Corps Cavalry Regiment: A & B Sqns 1/1st RWY (21 June 1916–late November 1916); C Sqn 1/1st Hants Carabiniers (17 June 1916 – 25 July 1917); RHQ 1/1st Hants Carabiniers (17 June 1916 – 25 July 1917); A & B Sqns 1/1st Hants Carabiniers (January 1917–25 July 1917); A & B Sqns SIH (November 1916–16 January 1917)
- X Corps Cavalry Regiment: C Sqn NIH (11 May 1916–August 1917), S Sqn 6th (Inniskilling) Dragoons and B Sqn NIH (21 June 1916–August 1917)
- XI Corps Cavalry Regiment: 1/1st Westmorland and Cumberland Yeomanry (less A Sqn) (15 May 1916 – 21 July 1917); Corps served in Italy from 1 December 1917 to 13 March 1918: 1st KEH (15 December 1917–May 1918; A Sqn remained with corps)
- XII Corps Cavalry Regiment: In Macedonia: A & D Sqns 1/1st L&BH (from 11 May 1917)
- XIII Corps Cavalry Regiment: 1/1st Northumberland Hussars (April 1916–August 1917); C Sqn 1st KWH (May–October 1918); 1/1st Northumberland Hussars (returned 1 October 1918)
- XIV Corps Cavalry Regiment: A & B Sqns 2nd KEH, S Sqn 21st Lancers (June 1916–July 1917); Corps transferred to Italy 5 November 1917: 1/1st Northants Yeomanry (10 November 1917); Corps became GHQ British Force in Italy 18 April 1918 and Corps Cavalry became GHQ Troops
- XV Corps Cavalry Regiment: A & B Sqns SIH (May–November 1916), C Sqn 1/1st Surrey Yeomanry 11–19 May 1916); 1/1st RWY (November 1916–3 September 1917)
- XVI Corps Cavalry Regiment: In Macedonia: A & B Sqns 1/1st Surrey Yeomanry (from 27 December 1916)
- XVII Corps Cavalry Regiment: 1/1st Yorkshire Hussars (May 1916–26 August 1917), B Sqn 1/1st Surrey Yeomanry (8 July–4 September 1916); transferred to Macedonia, then XVI Corps Cavalry Rgt
- XVIII Corps Cavalry Regiment: A & B Sqns SIH (1 January–August 1917), B Sqn Herts Yeomanry (1 January –27 May 1917), F Sqn (to complete 2nd SIH) (27 May–August 1917); 1st KEH (17 July–November 1917)
- XIX Corps Cavalry Regiment: 2/1st Northumberland Hussars (23 June–28 August 1917) – transferred to V Corps, replaced by VII Corps Cavalry Regt
- XX Corps Cavalry Regiment: in Palestine: 1/1st Westminster Dragoons (August 1917–April 1918); 1/1st Worcestershire Yeomanry (from 5 May 1918)
- XXI Corps Cavalry Regiment: In Palestine: A Sqn 1/1st DLOY, A Sqn 1/1st Herts Yeomanry, C Sqn QORGY (from August 1917); B Sqn 1/1 Herts replaced C Sqn QORGY (9 May 1918)
- XXII Corps: Not formed until 31 December 1917, no cavalry assigned
- XXIII Corps: Did not serve overseas
- XXIV Corps: Never completed formation
