= Westminster Dragoons =

British Army Reserve unit

2nd County of London Yeomanry Westminster Dragoons
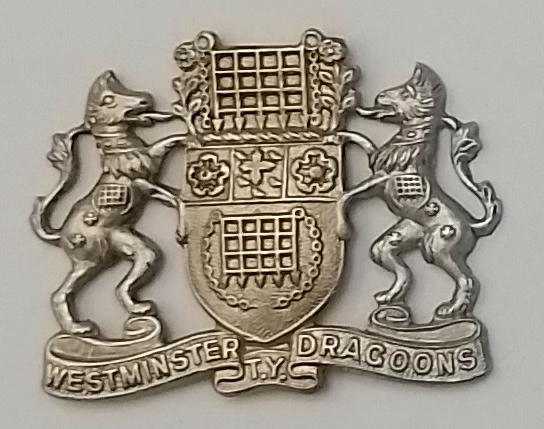
- Pre-2006 capbadge of the Westminster Dragoons
- Active: 1779–1783; 1794–1829; 1901–present
- Country: United Kingdom
- Branch: British Army
- Type: Yeomanry (First World War); Royal Armoured Corps (Second World War); Army Reserve cavalry
- Role: Light cavalry
- Size: Three Regiments (First World War); One Regiment (Second World War); One Squadron
- Part of: Royal Yeomanry
- Garrison/HQ: 1 Elverton Street, Westminster (pre-1914–1980); Fulham House, Fulham, London
- Nickname: Piccadilly Peacocks
- Motto: Fear Naught
- March: The Westminster Dragoon
- Mascot: The Gallipolian Cormorant
- Anniversaries: Jerusalem, Normandy
- Engagements: First World War Gallipoli 1915 Egypt 1915–17 Palestine 1917–18 France and Flanders 1918 Second World War North-West Europe 1944–45 Iraq 2003 (as part of the Royal Yeomanry)

Commanders
- Current commander: Major Mike Crofts
- Honorary colonel: Lieutenant-General Sir Simon Mayall
- Second-in-command: Captain Luke Griffiths
- Notable commanders: Colonel Charles Rosedew Burn; Maj Thomas Scott-Ellis, 8th Baron Howard de Walden

Insignia
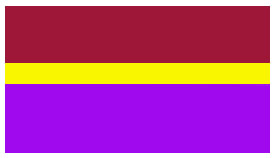
- Squadron stable belt

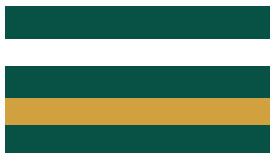
- Regimental tactical recognition flash

The Westminster Dragoons (WDs) was a yeomanry regiment of the British Army Army Reserve, located in central London. Its lineage is continued by one of the Royal Yeomanry's six squadrons. Formed in the aftermath of Second Boer War as part of the County of London Yeomanry, the WDs fought in the Battle of Gallipoli and led British forces onto the beaches during the Normandy Invasion in 1944. The squadron most recently saw action in Operation Telic for which it was mobilised for the 2003 war in Iraq.

== Precursors ==
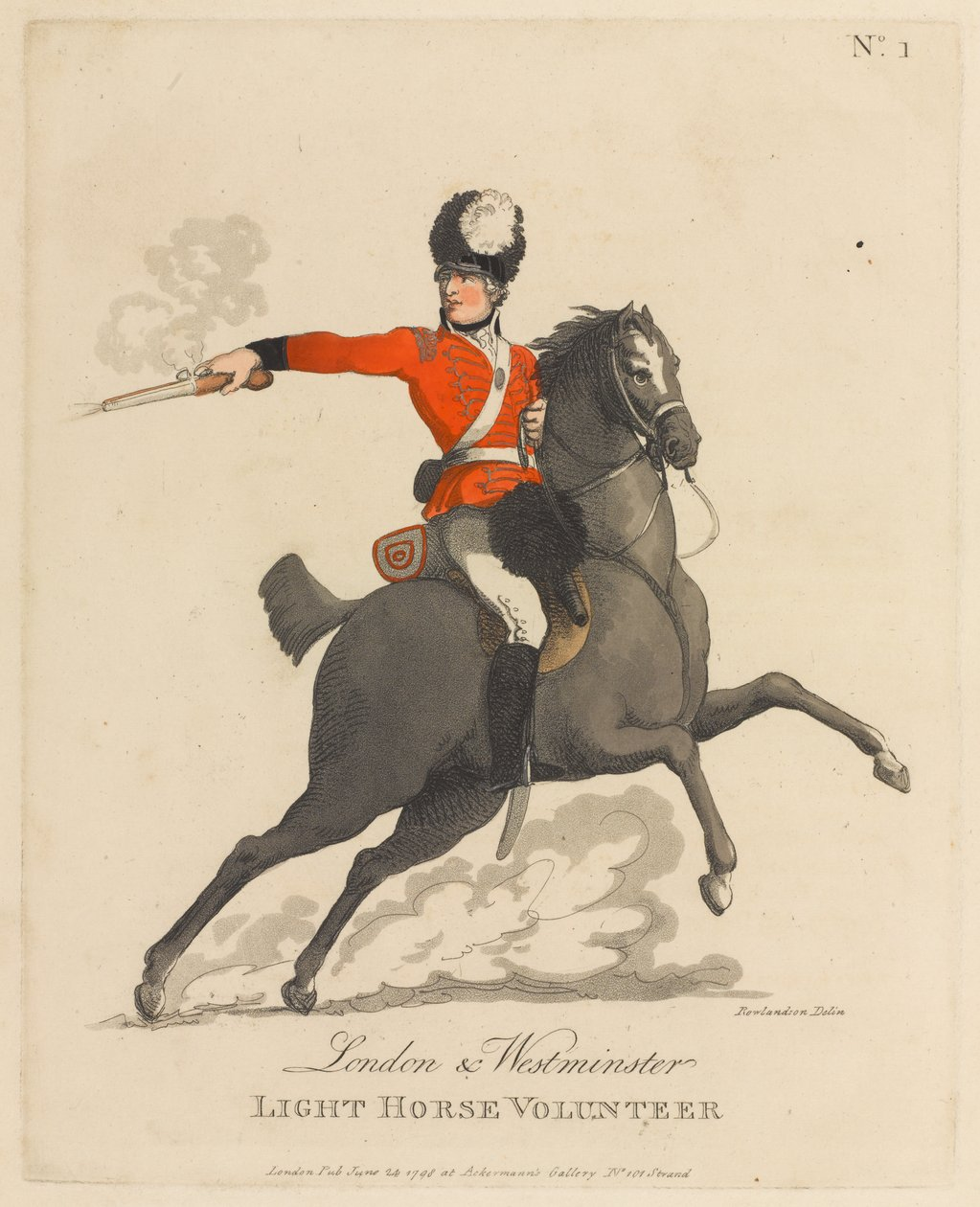
1798 engraving of a London and Westminster Light Horse trooper

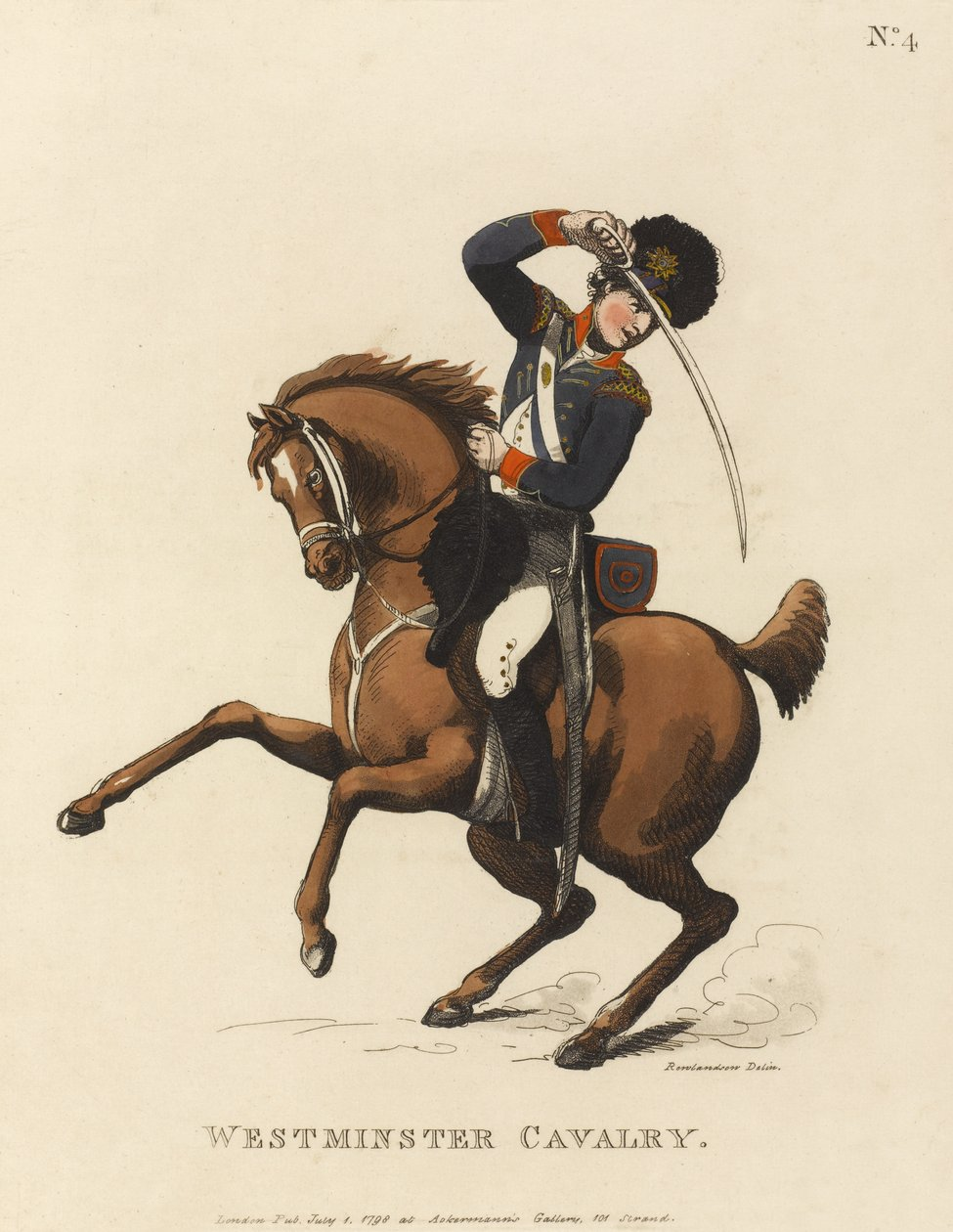
1798 engraving of a Westminster Volunteer Cavalry trooper

The first predecessor unit of the Westminster Dragoons was raised in London in 1779 as the London and Westminster Light Horse. Drawing its recruits from local merchants and bankers, The unit was raised as part of a wave of military volunteer units formed to defend Britain from foreign invasion during the American War of Independence. The London and Westminster Light Horse was disbanded in 1783, though Britain's entry into the French Revolutionary Wars in 1793 led the unit to be raised again in 1794 as part of the newly established British Volunteer Corps. Renamed the Westminster Volunteer Cavalry in 1797 with George III's permission, a barracks was built on Gray's Inn Road in 1812 to accommodate the unit. The regiment was disbanded again in 1829 and the barracks were decommissioned in 1830.

== Imperial Yeomanry ==
Following a string of defeats during Black Week in early December 1899, the British government realised that it would need more troops than just the Regular Army to fight the Second Boer War. On 13 December, the decision to allow volunteer forces to serve in South Africa was made, and a royal warrant was issued on 24 December. This officially created the Imperial Yeomanry (IY). The force was organised as county service companies of approximately 115 men signed up for one year, and volunteers from the Yeomanry Cavalry and civilians (usually middle and upper class) quickly filled the new force, which was equipped to operate as Mounted infantry (see dragoon). Second and third contingents were sent out in the following years.

One such unit was the 24th (Metropolitan Mounted Rifles) Battalion, consisting of 94th, 95th, 96th and 97th (Metropolitan Mounted Rifles) Companies raised in London for the second contingent on 30 March 1901. Later in 1901 the 28th (Westminster Dragoons) Battalion, was raised, with 127th–130th (Westminster Dragoons) Companies.

In 1901, 16 new IY regiments raised from veterans of the first IY contingent returning from South Africa were added to the existing Yeomanry Cavalry. The 2nd County of London Imperial Yeomanry was formed on 24 August 1901 with four squadrons and a machine gun section, perpetuating the 24th (Metropolitan Mounted Rifles) Battalion. Over 800 members of the regiment served in South Africa, and the regiment was awarded the Battle Honour South Africa 1902. On 2 August 1902 Westminster Council granted permission for the regiment to adopt the subtitle '(Westminster Dragoons)' (to perpetuate the 1779–1829 units) and to use the city's coat-of-arms as its cap badge. The King approved this addition early the following year. From the start it was smart regiment filled with wealthy gentlemen from the City and the West End. Their attitude and attire was such that, as they strutted across West London, members became known as the 'Piccadilly Peacocks'. Several of the unit's first officers were former officers of the 1st The Royal Dragoons, forerunners of the Blues and Royals; one of the first troop leaders was Raj Rajendra Narayan, Maharaj Kumar (Prince) of Cooch Behar. They brought with them the Royals' pre-Waterloo cap badge, which was later adopted by Colonels and Brigadiers of the staff, which is why, until a common Royal Yeomanry capbadge was adopted in 2006, young WD officers often found themselves amused at being saluted by officers of higher rank. The WD stable belt (worn in barracks) bears the Royal racing colours – the imperial hues of purple, gold and scarlet as a result of the personal friendship of its first commanding officer, Colonel Charles Rosedew Burn, with King Edward VII, whose Aide-de-camp Burn had been when he was Prince of Wales.

As an urban regiment, the yeomen were unable to supply their own horses, so the senior Westminster officers made use of their links to the highest ranks of Society to borrow mounts from the Household Cavalry for summer training camps. Later horses were hired. Even at this time, the WDs were at the forefront of using new equipment, being the second unit in the British army after the Westmorland and Cumberland Yeomanry to be equipped with mobile wireless. In 1910, Lord Howard de Walden presented two Marconi pack sets to the regiment.

In 1907 the regimental headquarters (RHQ) was at 102 Victoria Street, but by 1914 it had moved to 1 Elverton Street, Westminster. (Note: After HQ (Berkshire and Westminster Dragoons) Squadron, The Royal Yeomanry vacated the Elverton Street drill hall in 1980 and moved to the Duke of York's Headquarters, it was demolished and replaced by a housing and office complex.)

== Territorial Force ==
When the IY were subsumed into the new Territorial Force (TF) under the Haldane Reforms of 1908, the regiment simply dropped 'Imperial' from its title. It was attached to the London Mounted Brigade for training, but was otherwise under the command of London District.

== World War I ==
=== Mobilisation ===
The Westminster Dragoons' summer camp in 1914 was at Goring-on-Thames. It began on 25 July, but the regiment was recalled to Westminster when mobilisation orders arrived on 5 August. The regiment reorganised on the three-squadron basis used by the Regular cavalry and purchased horses.

In accordance with the Territorial and Reserve Forces Act 1907 (7 Edw. 7, c.9), which brought the Territorial Force into being, the TF was intended to be a home defence force for service during wartime and members could not be compelled to serve outside the country. However, on the outbreak of war on 4 August 1914, many members volunteered for Imperial Service. Therefore, TF units were split in August and September 1914 into 1st Line (liable for overseas service) and 2nd Line (home service for those unable or unwilling to serve overseas) units. Later, a 3rd Line was formed to act as a reserve, providing trained replacements for the 1st and 2nd Line regiments.

=== 1/2nd County of London Yeomanry ===
==== Egypt ====
The regiment sailed on 10 September for Egypt, thereby being one of the first Yeomanry regiments to go overseas on active service. It arrived at Alexandria on 25 September and went to relieve the 3rd Dragoon Guards as the Cairo Garrison cavalry regiment. On 19 January 1915, it joined the 1/1st Hertfordshire Yeomanry to form the Yeomanry Mounted Brigade. The regiment carried out security and escort duties in Cairo and patrols on the fringe of the Sinai Desert to protect the Suez Canal.

The brigade joined the 2nd Mounted Division on 13 August and was redesignated as the 5th (Yeomanry) Mounted Brigade. It was dismounted to take part in the Gallipoli campaign, leaving a squadron HQ and two troops (about 100 officers and men) in Egypt to look after the horses.

==== Gallipoli ====
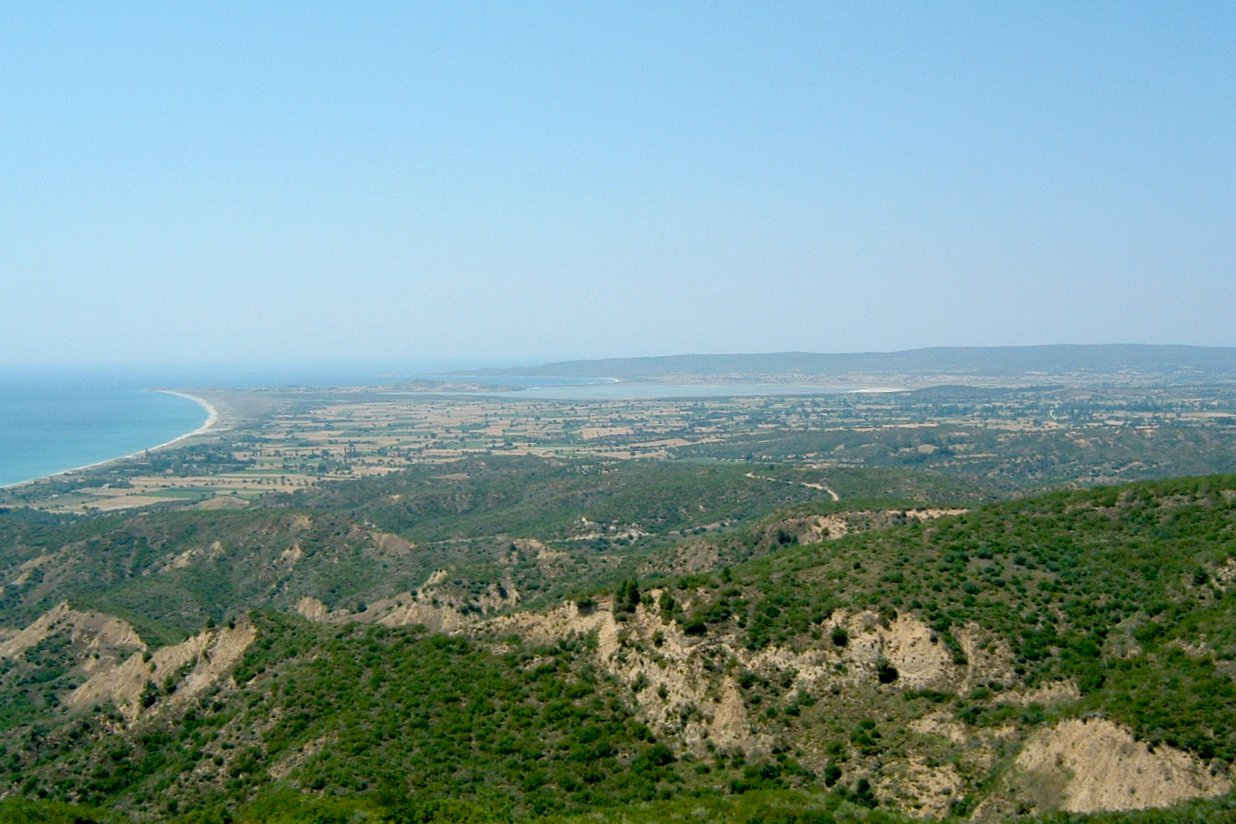
View of Suvla from Battleship Hill

The regiment sailed from Alexandria on 14 August, arriving at Mudros on 17 August. It landed at "A" Beach, Suvla Bay, the following day and moved into reserve positions at Lala Baba on the night of 20 August. On 21 August, it advanced to Chocolate Hill and was in reserve for the attacks on Scimitar Hill and Hill 112. Due to losses during the Battle of Scimitar Hill and wastage during August 1915, the 2nd Mounted Division had to be reorganised. On 4 September 1915, the 1st Composite Mounted Brigade was formed from 1st (1st South Midland), 2nd (2nd South Midland) and 5th (Yeomanry) Mounted Brigades.

==== Western Frontier ====
5th Yeomanry Regiment left Suvla on 31 October 1915 for Mudros. It left Mudros on 27 November, arrived at Alexandria on 1 December and went to Mena Camp, Cairo. The brigade left the 2nd Mounted Division on 7 December, was reformed and remounted, and joined the Western Frontier Force. The Yeomanry Mounted Brigade was broken up by March 1916, and the regiment was attached to the 6th Mounted Brigade, still in the Western Frontier Force.

The regiment was split up at the beginning of 1917:

- RHQ, C Squadron and the Machine Gun Section were on the Northern Section of the Suez Canal Defences.
- A Squadron was assigned to the 53rd (Welsh) Division from 14 January to 14 February then with 74th (Yeomanry) Division from 5 April to 23 August.
- B Squadron acted as the depot squadron at Zeitoun, Cairo, from 17 January to 23 August.

==== Palestine ====
The Westminster Dragoons now joined the Egyptian Expeditionary Force (EEF) for the Sinai and Palestine campaign. In August 1917, the regiment was concentrated and formed XX Corps Cavalry Regiment. The WDs were involved in fierce fighting, both mounted and dismounted. Early on 31 October the regiment took part in the attack on Beersheba. In the first phase it held a position on the right flank of XX Corps under shrapnel and machine gun fire. A and B Squadrons fired intermittent bursts of rifle and Hotchkiss machine gun fire, but expected a counter-attack. The infantry attacked at 12.15 in the second phase, and the Turks began retiring from their central position. At 14.00 the WD moved out in mounted pursuit but were held up after about a mile by heavy shrapnel and machine gun fire. At 16.30 the enemy retired. The WD's casualties amounted to one other rank (OR) and two horses killed, one officer, 16 ORs and several horses wounded; the engagement resulted in awards of one Military Cross (MC) and three Military Medal (MM) to members of the regiment.

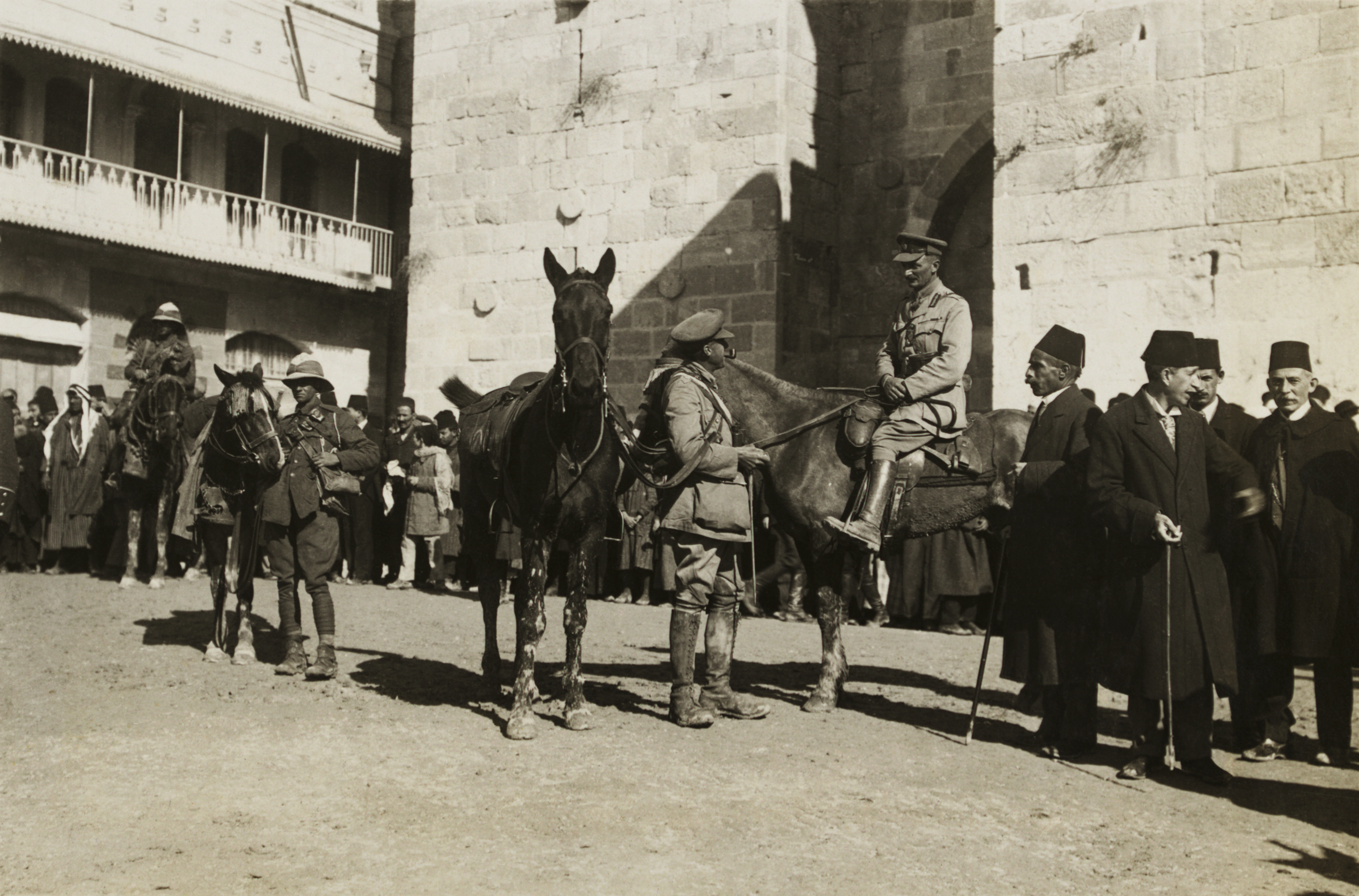
Brigadier General Watson of the 60th (2/2nd London) Division enters Jerusalem. Two Westminster Dragoons can be seen on the left.

After the fall of Beersheba, the regiment was briefly split with C Sqn covering the advance of 53rd (Welsh) Division and A & B Sqns attached to the Australian Mounted Division operating between Beersheba and Gaza. It came back under XX Corps in November. A Squadron was the first formed body of troops to enter Jerusalem after the city had been surrendered to two sergeants of 2/19th Battalion, London Regiment, and the regiment bears the liberation of that city as a battle honour.

All squadrons were then withdrawn for security duties at Bethlehem, then operated on the right flank of the army, where on 27 December C Sqn repulsed a serious attempt by the Turks from Deir Ibn Obeid to recapture Jerusalem.

When the EEF resumed its advance in March 1918, the WD advanced 10 miles beyond Jerusalem, but the German spring offensive led to an urgent call for troops to be sent from the EEF to reinforce the British Expeditionary Force (BEF), and nine Yeomanry regiments were hurriedly converted to the machine gun role.

==== Western Front ====
In April 1918, the regiment left XX Corps and was reformed as F Battalion, Machine Gun Corps. F Battalion, MGC was posted to France, arriving on 1 June 1918. On 19 August 1918 it was renumbered as 104th (Westminster Dragoons) Battalion, Machine Gun Corps. It remained on the Western Front for the rest of the war. At the Armistice, it was serving as Army Troops with the Second Army.

=== 2/2nd County of London Yeomanry ===
The 2nd Line regiment was formed at Westminster in August 1914. Early in 1915, it went to Feltham and in the summer to Harlow. There are three versions of its subsequent history:

- Order of Battle of Divisions Part 2A. The Territorial Force Mounted Divisions and the 1st-Line Territorial Force Divisions (42–56) says that the regiment joined the 60th (2/2nd London) Division at Harlow on 24 June 1915, transferred to 61st (2nd South Midland) Division on 24 January 1916 until February when the division moved to Wiltshire. On 20 February, it joined 59th (2nd North Midland) Division and was with the division until April.
- the official Commanders Home Forces shows the regiment with the 58th Division in June 1916. It is then listed as overseas up to April 1918 and in August 1918 as with the Tank Corps.
- the regimental history, 2nd County of London (Westminster Dragoons) Yeomanry: The First Twenty Years says that the regiment went to France, dismounted, at the end of 1915 for guard duties. It then returned to Wool in the summer of 1916. Most of the other ranks were posted to the infantry and the officers and senior NCOs joined the Tank Corps.

There are no battle honours to support overseas service in France. (Note: Had the 2nd Line served on the Western Front in 1915 and 1916, it would be entitled to the battle honour France and Flanders, 1915–16.) It appears that the unit was absorbed into the Tank Corps.

=== 3/2nd County of London Yeomanry ===
The 3rd Line regiment was formed in 1915 and in the summer was affiliated to a Reserve Cavalry Regiment in Eastern Command. In 1916, it was with the 9th Reserve Cavalry Regiment at The Curragh and in early 1917 it was absorbed into the 4th Reserve Cavalry Regiment at Aldershot.

== Interwar ==
After World War I the WDs once again embraced new technology, making the decision to become an armoured car unit at a time when many yeomanry units were determined to remain mounted. (Note: In War Office letter 9/Yeomanry/964 dated 5 May 1920 concerning the conversion of all bar the 14 most senior Yeomanry regiments from cavalry, the Westminster Dragoons are shown as having elected to convert immediately.) (Note: The eight yeomanry regiments converted to Armoured Car Companies of the Royal Tank Corps (RTC) were: 19th (Lothians and Border) Armoured Car Company, Royal Tank Corps from Lothians and Border Horse; 20th (Fife and Forfar) Armoured Car Company, Royal Tank Corps from Fife and Forfar Yeomanry; 21st (Gloucestershire Yeomanry) Armoured Car Company, Royal Tank Corps from Royal Gloucestershire Hussars; 22nd (London) Armoured Car Company (Westminster Dragoons), Royal Tank Corps from Westminster Dragoons; 23rd (London) Armoured Car Company, Royal Tank Corps from 3rd County of London Yeomanry (Sharpshooters); 24th (Derbyshire Yeomanry) Armoured Car Company, Royal Tank Corps from Derbyshire Yeomanry; 25th (Northamptonshire Yeomanry) Armoured Car Company, Royal Tank Corps from Northamptonshire Yeomanry; 26th (East Riding of York Yeomanry) Armoured Car Company, Royal Tank Corps from East Riding Yeomanry) The decision to accept immediate conversion was that of its then commanding officer, Lord Howard de Walden. On 11 March 1920, the regiment reformed with the title 4th Armoured Car Company (Westminster Dragoons), but this was quickly changed to 22nd (London) Armoured Car Company (Westminster Dragoons), Tank Corps in the retitled Territorial Army (TA), thus forming its link with the Tank Corps (Royal Tank Corps from 18 October 1923, and Royal Tank Regiment (RTR) from 11 April 1939).

The armoured car company was expanded to a full battalion (22nd (Westminster Dragoons) Battalion, RTR) in January 1938.

== World War II ==
=== Officer training ===
On mobilisation at the outbreak of World War II in September 1939, the Westminster Dragoons became an Officer Cadet Training Unit, with over 90 per cent of pre-war Westminster Dragoons gaining their commissions and transferring into units throughout the British Army before the Regiment reverted to an armoured role in 1940. Among them was Captain Philip John Gardner VC MC, who had joined as a trooper before the war, commissioned and then transferred to the RTR, going on to win the Victoria Cross for saving the life of a badly wounded officer of the King's Dragoon Guards whose armoured car was out of action and under heavy fire.

=== Specialist armour ===
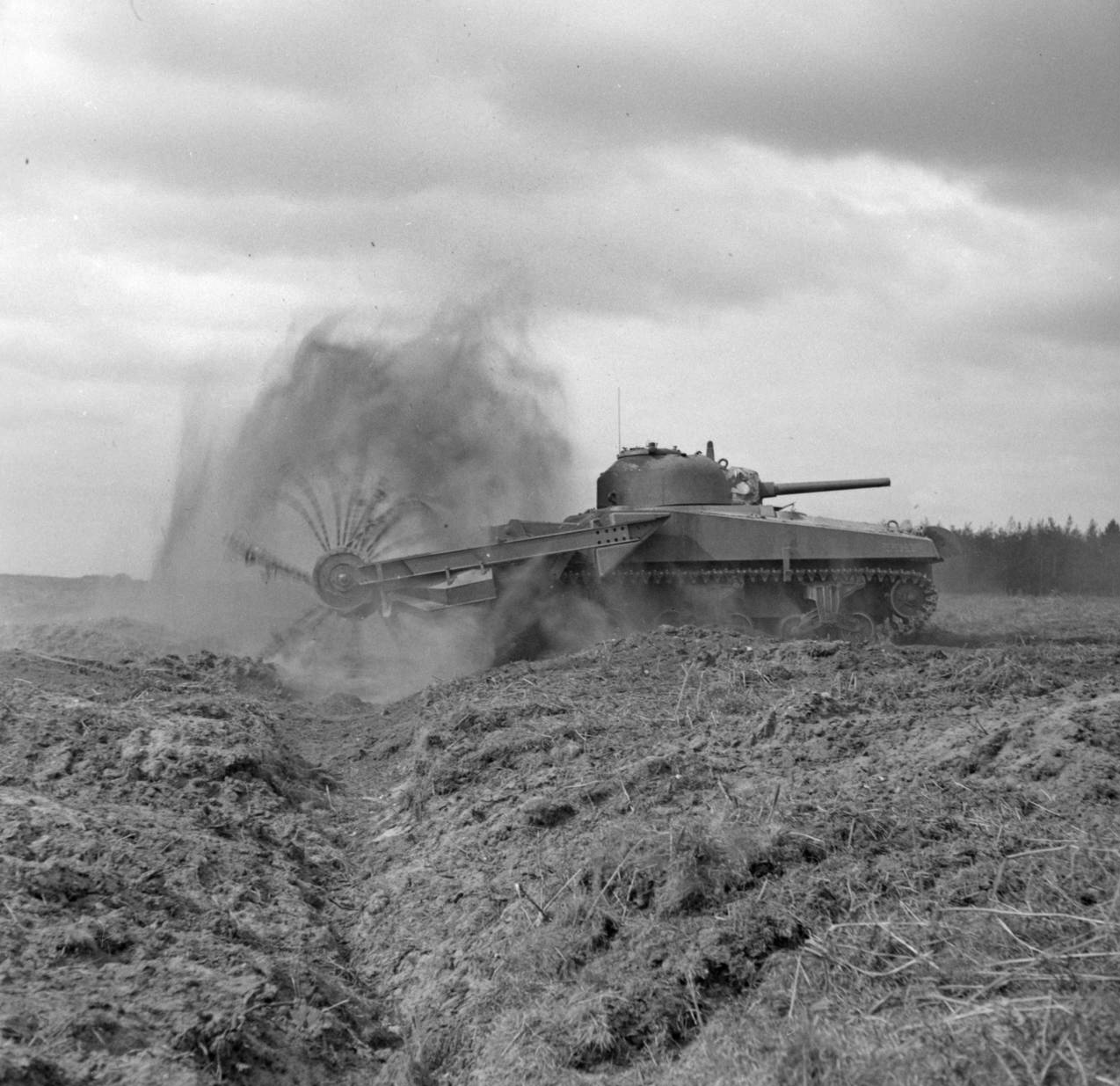
Sherman Crab under test. The flail has been lowered to work in a dip in the ground.

The regiment regained its combat status on 11 November 1940, when it became 2nd County of London Yeomanry (Westminster Dragoons) in the Royal Armoured Corps (RAC) – always known as simply the Westminster Dragoons. The regiment joined the newly formed 30th Armoured Brigade in 11th Armoured Division on 8 March 1941. In May 1942 the brigade transferred to 42nd Armoured Division, and then in October 1943 to 79th Armoured Division under Major-General Percy Hobart. This division was equipping with specialist armour ('Hobart's Funnies') for the planned Allied invasion of Normandy (Operation Overlord), and 30th Armoured became the Flail tank brigade of the division.

The Germans planted over four million mines along the French coast to hinder the Allied landings in 1944. To break through these defences at the start of the Normandy Invasion, the British produced a number of novel armoured fighting vehicles under Hobart's ingenious direction, including the Sherman Crab. The Crab bore a rotating drum with dozens of chains attached; these detonated mines in its path to produce a beaten passage through the thickest of minefields.

On 1 January 1944, then under the command of Lt-Col W.Y.K. Blair-Oliphant, the regiment moved to Thorpeness in Suffolk to begin flail training, though no flail tanks had yet arrived. In the meantime it received a draft of men who had experience with the Scorpion flail, and some tanks equipped with anti-mine rollers. By February the regiment had a mixed roster of tanks for training: 19 Sherman V, 17 Centaur 1, 4 Cromwell, 6 Valentine II Scorpions, but only 3 of the Sherman Crabs that they would take into action. The slow, unsafe Scorpions were too unlike the Crab to be much use for training. The regiment practised driving on and off a concrete mock-up of a tank landing craft (LCT), the entrance of which was only 7 inches (18 cm) wider than the rotor of the Crab. It also practised indirect gunfire techniques controlled by a Forward Observation Officer (FOO).

In March the regiment received its orders to mobilise, and training intensified. The last major exercise ('Fabius') was held in early May, but there were still too few Crabs: the regiment collected more Sherman V 'Quick Fix' gun tanks that could be fitted as 'pilot' roller tanks, but in the event these were used as command tanks. Later in the month the regiment concentrated in camp at Stanswood in Hampshire, ready to embark for Normandy with 56 Crabs, 26 Shermans, 3 Armoured recovery vehicles (ARVs) and 13 Scout cars; it still had 6 Scorpions on charge, but these were left behind, as were the 'Rollers'.

=== D Day ===
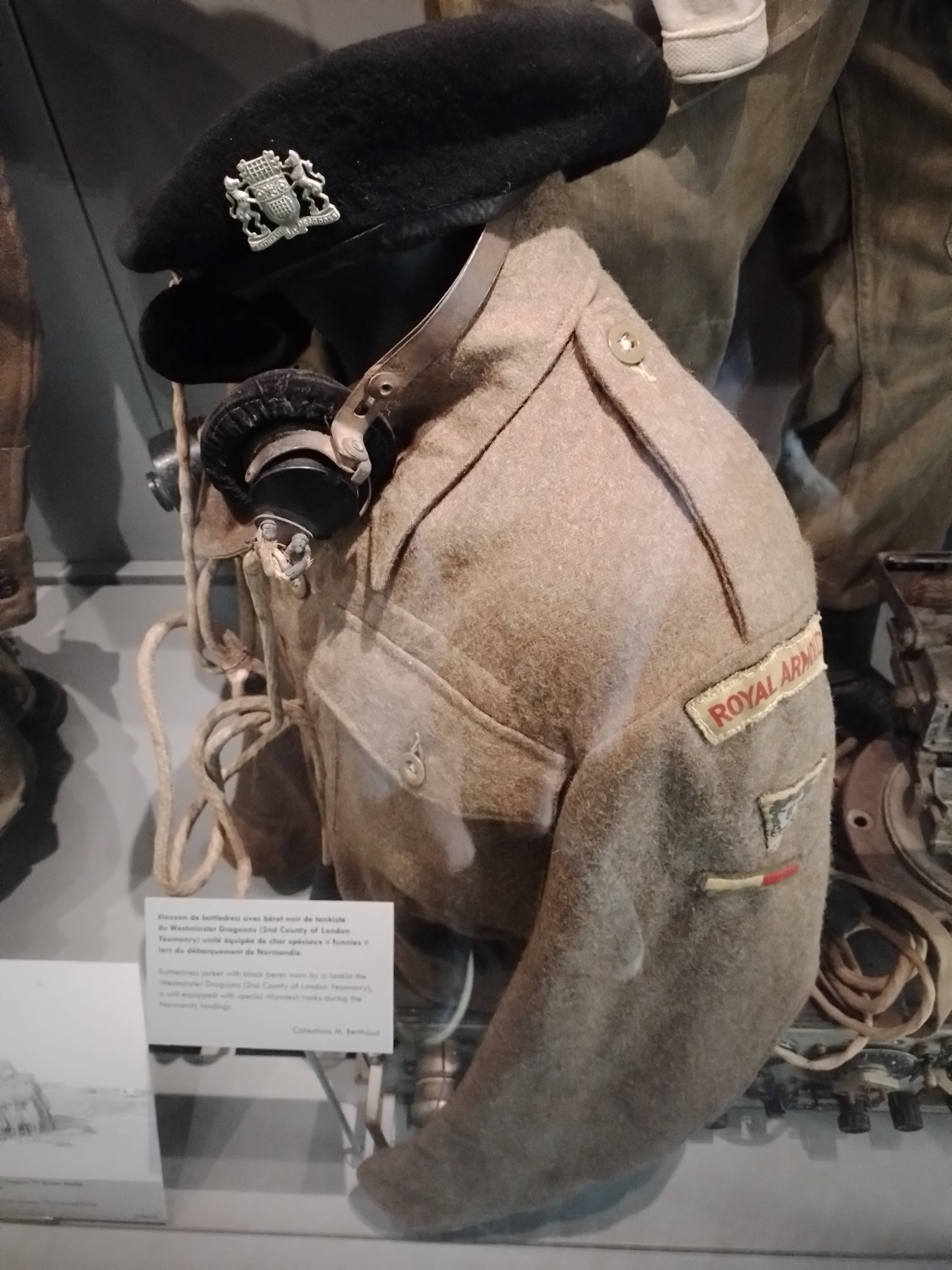
Uniform of a Tankist of the Westminster Dragoons on D-Day.

For the assault landings the Westminster Dragoons were under the command of 50th (Northumbrian) Infantry Division on Gold Beach, with A Squadron detached under the command of 22nd Dragoons to work with 3rd Canadian Division on Juno Beach and 3rd British Division on Sword Beach. The Crabs were to form composite breaching teams with Armoured Vehicle Royal Engineers (AVREs) fitted with a variety of devices to make lanes through the enemy's beach defences. These teams had trained together at Stanswood and on the morning of 6 June, D Day, they were deployed as follows:

- Part of A Sqn, WD, and 80 Sqn, 5 Assault Regiment, Royal Engineers (RE)) with 8 Canadian Brigade (Nan Beach)
- W and Y Breaching Sqns (13 Crabs of B Sqn, WD, and 82 Sqn, 6 Assault Regiment, RE) with 231 Bde (Jig Beach)
- X and Z Breaching Sqns (13 Crabs of C Sqn, WD, and 81 Sqn, 6 Assault Regiment, RE) with 69 Bde (King Beach)

The LCTs were supposed to be preceded by Sherman DD 'swimming' tanks, but in Gold sector the surf was too bad and they were not launched, so the breaching teams were the first vehicles ashore at H-Hour (07.25). They then got to work. For example, Lt Pear leading two Crabs with No 1 Breaching Team of X Breaching Sqn drove off the LCT and waded 100 yards (91 m) to the beach, where his rear tank got bogged in clay. Pear flailed a lane across the beach up to the lateral road and turned left as planned. His role now was to remain in reserve, giving covering fire. However, the team at No 3 Lane had failed, and Pear was ordered to carry on inland. He crossed a stream and an anti-tank ditch, finding to his surprise that the bridges had not been blown by the enemy. He was then stopped by a large crater (probably from a British shell or bomb), but this was quickly bridged by an AVRE and Pear continued to flail a lane up the hill so that the DD tanks go move inland. No 2 Team was held up beyond the lateral road by boggy ground and craters, despite making a 'sporting effort to get past'. Both Crabs of No 3 Team got to the beach but were hit in the rotor by a German 88 mm gun on the sea wall at La Rivière. (Note: This gun position had been the aiming point for six squadrons of Flying Fortress bombers, the guns of four Destroyers, a field artillery regiment, two rocket-firing LCTs and sundry other weapons, yet remained unsuppressed, and the effect of the bombs and gunfire was to create troublesome craters.) The squadron commander ordered the AVRE bridgelayer to reverse and go to help No 2 Team.

In Z Bridging Sqn, Captain Roger Bell, leading No 6 Breaching Team, suffered a burnt-out starter motor, had to be towed off the LCT by an AVRE and was late on the beach. He saw an AVRE hit by the troublesome '88' at La Rivière, so he moved to a position where he could engage it, and destroyed the gun. Bell then began flailing a lane across the beach, but got bogged just as he crossed the lateral road. Corporal Thorpe took over, but had a track blown off by a mine. Bell's Crab was then towed out by an AVRE that dropped its Fascine into the bog by the road, and Bell proceeded up the road. The Crabs of Nos 4 and 5 Breaching Teams got bogged before they reached the road, but No 5 Team gave covering fire with High explosive shell and smoke shell to No 6 Team and the infantry attacking La Rivière. (Note: There is a confused report of a Covenanter flail tank being used by 6 Assault Regiment, RE, on Gold Beach. According to the published account by Lt Richard Peard, 280th Field Company, RE, the commander detached his flail on the beach and moved up close to the sea wall to use his gun to destroy a German emplacement that had previously knocked out an AVRE. This must be a misidentification, because the War Diary of the Westminster Dragoons, which provided the flail tanks on Gold Beach, shows that the regiment had no Covenanters on charge at any time in 1944, and that the flails landed on D Day were all Sherman Crabs. The flail that knocked out the 88mm gun at La Rivière was commanded by Capt Roger Bell, leading No 6 Breaching Team of C Sqn, Westminster Dragoons, who was awarded an MC.)

B Squadron Westminster Dragoons had similar experiences. The breaching team for Lane 1 could not be landed because the LCT was hit on the run in, and the team for Lane 2 was landed at Lane 3. Lieutenant Townsend-Green's Crab flailed for 20 yards (18 m) before it got bogged, so he took over Cpl Barton's Crab and took a different route towards the vital ramp near La Hamel. However, he was then bogged and the Crab hit three times by a German field gun at La Hamel. The Lane 3 team was more or less in the right place and Serjeant Lindsay flailed a path onto the mainland. He then turned to support the attack by 1st Battalion Hampshire Regiment on La Hamel but the Crab was destroyed by anti-tank fire in the town. Although wounded, Lindsay evacuated his crew. Captain Taylor in the second flail cleared a lane before his Crab was destroyed by a double mine, but the lane provided a clear exit. The team in Lane 4 was completely bogged, but Lanes 5 and 6 were successfully cleared within 15–22 minutes of landing, despite the breach commander's Crab being hit by shellfire on the landing craft ramp and burning out. Major Stanyon therefore took to his feet to direct the mass of Crabs, AVREs and DD tanks, despite heavy machine gun fire: he was awarded a Military Cross (MC). The Lane 5 team then flailed paths through the inland minefield for the infantry, self-propelled (SP) artillery and anti-aircraft gunners.

The landings on Juno beach began at 07.50, those at Sword at 07.25. Both were successful, and the Crabs flailed routes through the minefields. Once Sword was secure, the remaining 2 and 4 Trps of A Sqn were landed there at H + 3 hours to work with A Sqn 22nd Dragoons and 629 Assault Sqn, RE, to help in a thrust towards Caen (they were a late addition to the plan, and had not practised landing from LCTs). The mobile battlegroup was to consist of the tanks of the Staffordshire Yeomanry carrying infantry of 2nd Battalion King's Shropshire Light Infantry, supported by SP guns of 7th Field Regiment, Royal Artillery. Congestion on the beach was so bad that the Staffordshire Yeomanry only linked up at 13.00; the RE squadron was ineffective after heavy casualties in the landing and B Trp 22nd Dragoons had just two flails left to join the WDs in preparing the route. The infantry had been ready since 11.00 and set off on foot at 12.30, leaving the armour and their heavy weapons to catch up. The armoured column made slow progress, restricted to a single road by bad going on one side and a deep minefield on the other. It overtook the infantry at the Périers-sur-le-Dan ridge and reached Beuville by 14.30, but the flails had to wait while the mobile column fought off a large-scale counter-attack by 21st Panzer Division from Caen. Four WD Crabs were knocked out in this engagement, which stopped 3rd British Division from achieving its ambitious objective of taking Caen that day.

Lt-Col Blair-Oliphant had landed an hour after H-Hour (aboard C Sqn's ARV, because his command tank was not due to arrive until later). By the time the regiment 'harboured' that night, B Sqn's ARV and C Sqn's M14 half-track had landed with four ammunition and petrol lorries. C Squadron harboured at Crépon with 11 Crabs (seven of them recovered from the beach). At 05.45 next morning (D+1, 7 June) they moved cautiously forward to a hedgerow but came under heavy fire, suffering several casualties among the dismounted crews. The squadron leader spotted an enemy field gun at a range of just 150 yards (140 m) and jumped onto Lt Hoban's tank to direct fire: one shot was enough to knock out the German gun. The squadron moved back 400 yards (370 m) and attended to its casualties. A composite force was then formed to deal with the Germans, consisting of Hoban's I Trp, two Churchill Crocodiles of 141st Regiment, RAC, and a few men of the Royal Artillery and Royal Signals to act as infantry. The Crocodiles 'flamed' a pillbox, the Crabs engaged dugouts with HE and machine gun fire, and 100 Germans surrendered with five guns. The Crabs were used later that day to round up prisoners of war round Crépon. By D+2 (8 June), B and C Sqns were at Saint-Gabriel-Brécy, with nine fit Crabs: seven were damaged beyond repair and 10 were repairable.

On D+2 four of A Sqn's Crabs assisted 3rd British Division at Lion-sur-Mer, clearing lanes through mines and barbed wire and engaging strongpoints with their main guns and machine guns. The following day A Sqn and a troop of AVREs helped 1st East Riding Yeomanry and 2nd Bn Royal Ulster Rifles in an attempt to advance beyond Périers. They had 1,000 yards (910 m) of open country to cross under shell, mortar and machine gun fire, the 2nd Bn RUR losing almost 200 men and the 1st EYR four tanks. The Crabs performed well in the unaccustomed role of infantry tanks, but all the AVREs were knocked out.

The Westminster Dragoons continued to serve as part of 79th Armoured Division throughout the campaign in Normandy and North West Europe, usually detached to assist other formations of 21st Army Group as required.

=== Operation Constellation and The Netherlands ===
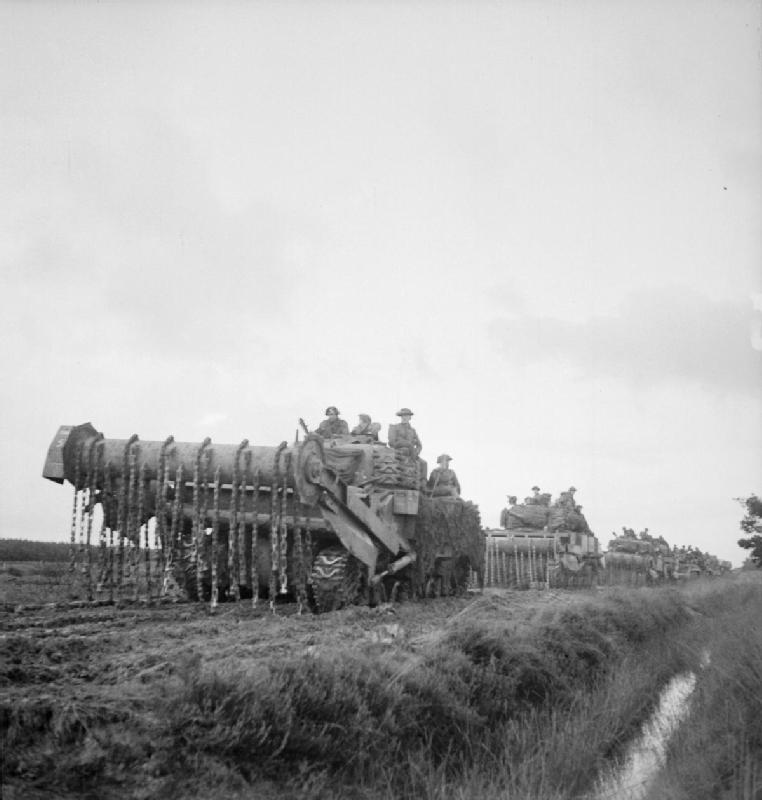
Sherman Crab flail tanks of the Westminster Dragoons carrying infantry of the 2nd Battalion, Argyll and Sutherland Highlanders during the advance east of Beringe, 22 November 1944

For example, during Operation Constellation to capture Overloon and Venray, the Crabs of A and C Sqns deployed with the AVREs 617 Assault Sqn, RE, to support 3rd British Division and 6th Guards Tank Brigade. At noon on 12 October 4th (Tank) Bn Coldstream Guards advanced to Overloon, where it encountered a minefield and A Sqn was ordered up to flail a path. One Crab (Lt Sutton) was disabled by a mine, and Sjt Harmston flailed a diversion round the wreck; other Crabs flailed two other lanes, and the Guards' Churchills advanced to take the town. Next day the Crabs continued flailing in front of the Coldstreamers, without finding any mines, but Lt Hall's tank engaged an enemy Panther tank. On 14 October the Crabs flailed a path where RE mine-lifting parties had previously come under fire, but the advance was halted by a Tiger I that 'brewed up' seven Coldstream Churchills before starting on Lt Cooper's partly Hull-down Crab, which was subjected to a hail of fire. Inexplicably, the Tiger withdrew before destroying the Crab. 15 October was spent on maintenance, then on 16 October the squadron advanced again, in pouring rain, mud and a flooded brook (the Molen Beek). Although four crossings were attempted on 3rd Division's front, only Lance-Sjt Carter was successful, his Crab covered by smoke fired by the rest of his troop. The Churchills followed over what for the next 24 hours was the only crossing. On 17 October the Crabs were at work again, losing two to mines, and rapidly wearing out their flail chains when repeatedly requested to flail along roads. (6th Guards Tank Bde noted that the concentrations of minefields in Operation Constellation were the heaviest they had yet encountered, including a new mine powerful enough to disable their heavy Churchill tanks.) By 18 October the squadron was down to five serviceable tanks, but Cooper and Carter pushed on into Venray, flailing the town's main street and piles of rubble ahead of the Guards' Churchills.

Meanwhile, C Sqn had been operating with 4th (Tank) Bn Grenadier Guards since 12 October. Fifteen minutes before H-hour a minefield was discovered just short of the start line, and the Crabs had to deal with this despite badly broken ground. That attack went in successfully. Next day Lt Pear's 3 Trp had to flail a 1,000 yards (910 m) path followed by another of 700 yards (640 m) so the Grenadiers could reach their objective, followed by another of almost 1 mile (1.6 km) in the afternoon. On 16 October the squadron got badly bogged in full view of the enemy while trying to cross the Molen Beek and the attempt had to be abandoned. Next day a composite troop, comprising the fittest tanks and least tired crews was sent to help 29th Armoured Brigade, losing some tanks but carrying on and engaging anti-tank guns and capturing prisoners. The rest of C Sqn (three Crabs under Capt Bell, Lt Pear and Sjt Birch) helped 1st Bn Herefordshire Regiment in an attack north-east of Deurne on 17 October, under heavy fire. On 20 October A and C Sqns were pulled out to rejoin the regiment, receiving many compliments for their work.

B Squadron had been operating miles away with 7th Armoured Division and 53rd (Welsh) Infantry Division against 's-Hertogenbosch. 1 Troop operated so closely with A Sqn 1st Royal Tank Regiment that it was dubbed '5th Trp, A Sqn'. Small actions continued through early November. Lieutenant Michael Sutton won an MC on 2 November when he was supporting 23rd Hussars with two flails. A Hussars tanks was blown up on a mine, but the heavy fire prevented the crew from bailing out or sappers from clearing a path to it. Sutton flailed a path up to and round the disabled tank, then carried on flailing the road until an anti-tank gun disabled two Hussars' tanks and shot off his flail gear. Ordered to withdraw he had to do so slowly in reverse. While doing so he spotted a wounded man in a ditch: calling for smoke he got out of his tank and ran 20 yards (18 m) to bring the wounded man back to the tank, where another crew member dismounted to help get him aboard, all under heavy machine gun fire. Lieutenant Brian Pear was killed the following day while supporting 15th (Scottish) Infantry Division in an attack on Meijel: when Sjt Birch's Crab was hit and the crew unable to bale out he placed his tank between them and the enemy. Both Crabs were destroyed by anti-tank fire and only one man survived to be taken prisoner. The volume of fire was so great that 15th (Scottish) postponed all operations for 48 hours. C Squadron then flailed a path for 6th Guards Tank Bde, though 23 Churchills and one Crab were lost in an hour.

In a further small action at the end of November 1944, 12 flail tanks of A Squadron assisted units of the 11th Armoured Division in clearing a path through a minefield at the Battle of Broekhuizen. Several of the tanks got bogged down and one – that of Lieutenant Sam Hall of 4 Troop – was knocked out by a Panzerfaust. Today it stands in the Overloon War Museum.

=== Germany ===
The Westminster Dragoons were once more with 15th (Scottish) Division for the assault crossing of the Rhine (Operation Plunder) in March 1945, but were not called forward until bridges had been built. The regiment was surprised to learn from BBC radio reports that they had crossed a day before they actually did so. Once across the river barrier the campaign moved swiftly, with fewer prepared defensive positions to overcome, so there was little call for flail tanks. In early April RHQ and A Sqn were assigned to VIII Corps' Reserve, B Sqn to 1st Assault Bde in 21st Army Group Reserve, and C Sqn to 52nd (Lowland) Infantry Division. By now the Crabs were being used as normal gun tanks: on 15 April C Sqn provided armoured support to 3rd Division at Wildeshausen, where they repelled a number of enemy counter-attacks as well as carrying out a minor offensive operation of their own.

The Westminster Dragoons' war ended with the German surrender at Lüneburg Heath on 4 May 1945.

== Postwar to present ==
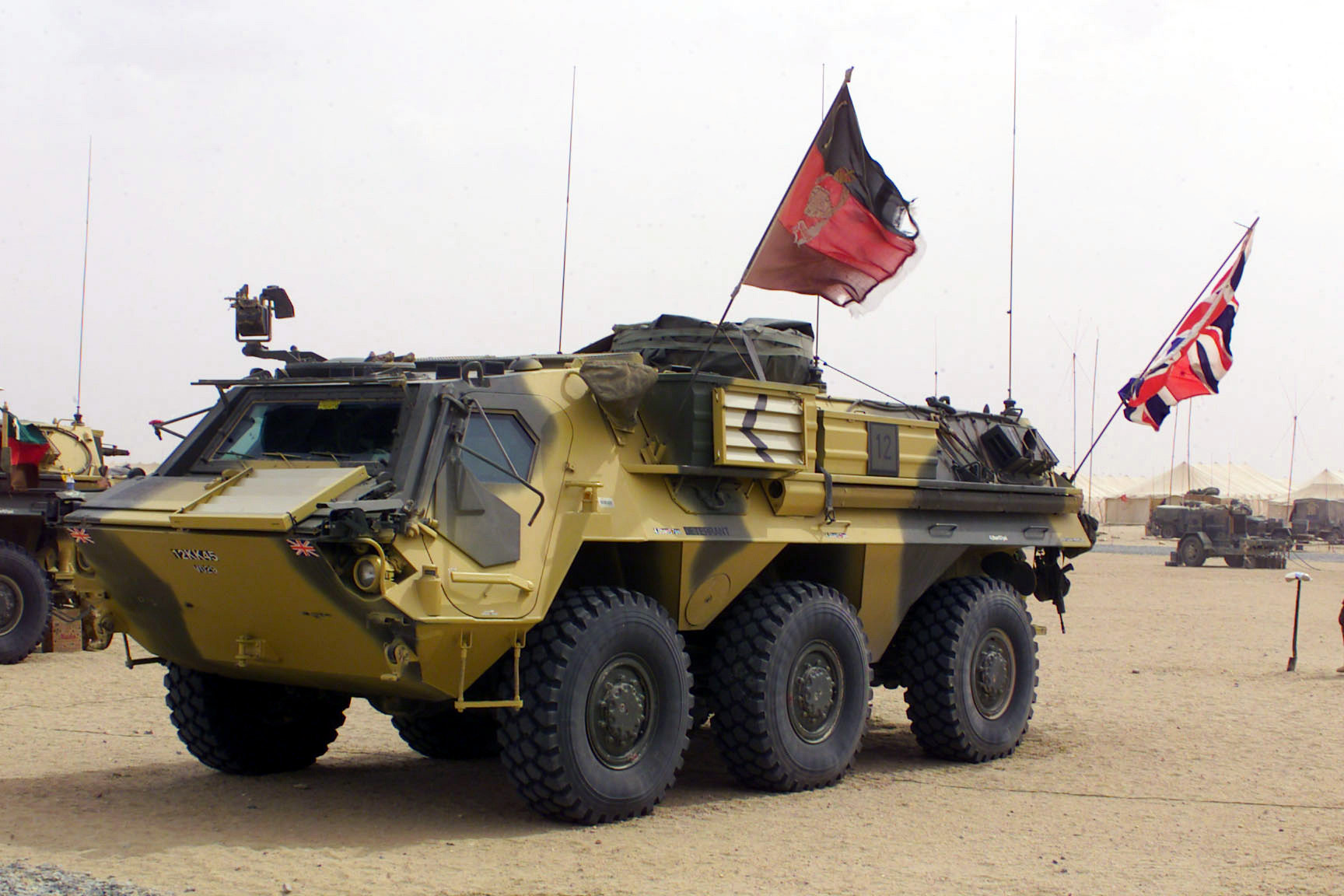
Fuchs CBRN Reconnaissance Vehicle

In 1947 the regiment was reconstituted in the TA as three squadrons with RHQ at Westminster. On 1 September 1951 it reversed its title to become The Westminster Dragoons (2nd County of London Yeomanry). When the TA was reduced on 1 May 1961, the regiment merged with R (Berkshire Yeomanry) Battery, 299 (Royal Buckinghamshire Yeomanry, Berkshire Yeomanry and The Queen's Own Oxfordshire Hussars) Field Regiment, Royal Artillery, to form the Berkshire and Westminster Dragoons, RAC, in which the Berkshire Yeomanry component formed C Squadron.

The Westminster Dragoons were disbanded on 30 March 1967 as part of the disbandment of the Territorial Army under the Reserve Forces Act 1966 and its replacement by a newly constituted organisation, the TAVR (Territorial and Army Volunteer Reserve). The legal effect of the Act and the orders implementing it (Army Order 2 dated 28 January 1967 and the Army Reserves Succession Warrant 1967) was that there was no succession of lineage from the disbanded units to those that were being raised. However, the warrant also stated 'the wish to provide for succession of units raised' and then listed those new units which would be deemed to be successors to previous Territorial Army Units. The Royal Yeomanry Regiment (Volunteers) was to be regarded as the successor to the Royal Wiltshire Yeomanry, the Sherwood Rangers Yeomanry, the Kent and Sharpshooters Yeomanry, the North Irish Horse, and the Berkshire and Westminster Dragoons. The squadron based at Chelsea, London was given the title 'Berkshire and Westminster Dragoons', somewhat anomalously given that the Berkshire Yeomanry element was separated to form 94 (Berkshire Yeomanry) Sqn in 71 (Yeomanry) Signal Regiment, Royal Corps of Signals; the situation was belatedly recognised in 1984 when the 'Berkshire' part of the HQ squadron's title was dropped and it was rebadged accordingly as Westminster Dragoons.

A bomb which detonated at the regiment's drill hall in Elverton Street caused minor damage in November 1971. The squadron operated as a medium reconnaissance unit equipped with armoured cars. It continued in this role until 1996, when it became part of the British Army's nuclear, biological and chemical defence regiment. It served in the NBC role until 1999. In that year, the Joint NBC Regiment was formed as a joint regular Army and Royal Air Force unit composed of four squadrons of the 1st Royal Tank Regiment and 27 Squadron Royal Air Force Regiment.

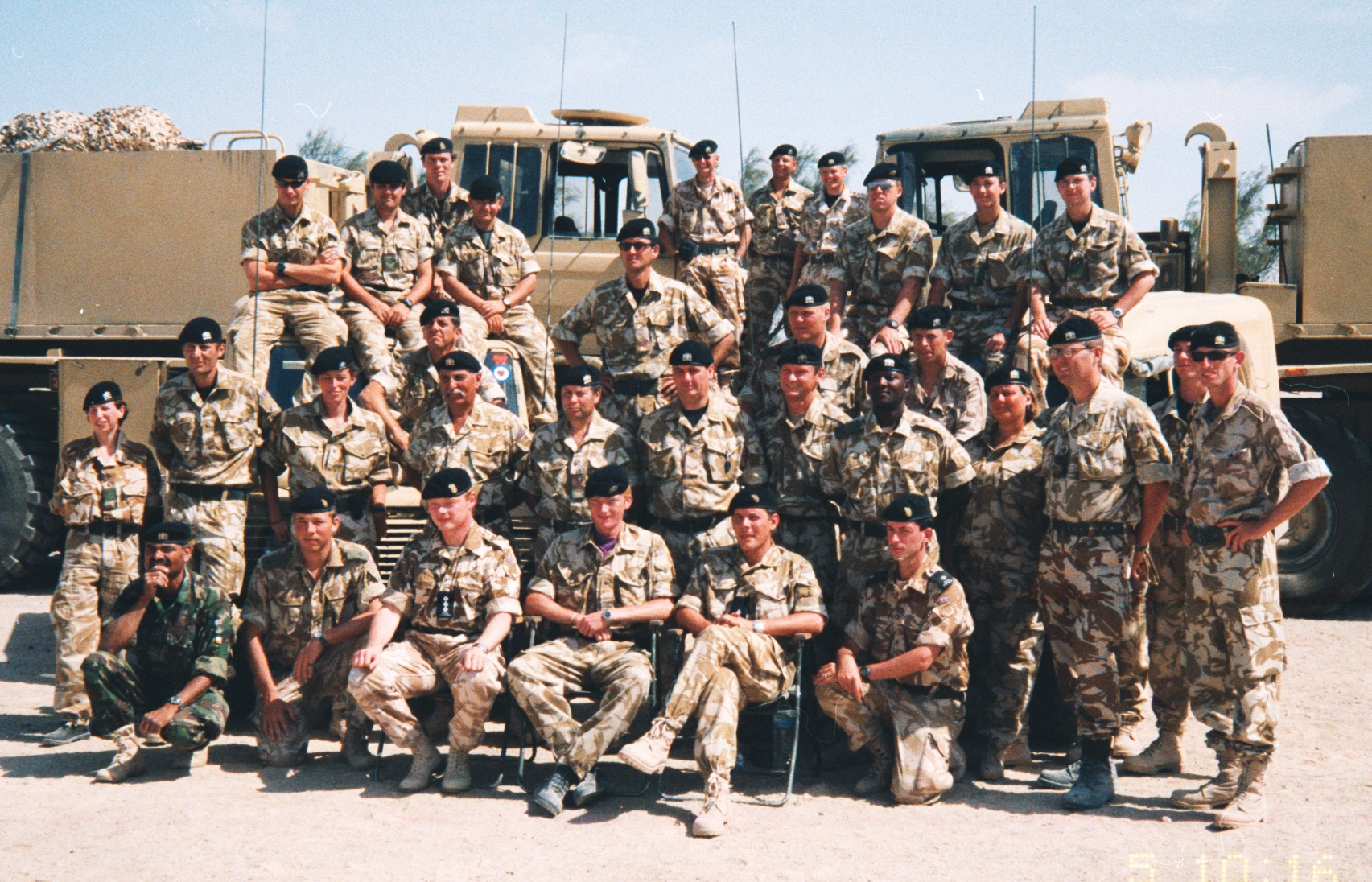
WDs at Shaibah Logistics Base, Iraq, May 2003

In January 2003, the Westminster Dragoons and A (Royal Wiltshire Yeomanry) Squadron were mobilised (along with augmentees from the Royal Yeomanry's three other squadrons and from the Royal Logistic Corps) for the impending war in Iraq. Together, these mobilised elements became a much-enlarged squadron of the Joint NBC Regiment. Westminster Dragoons found themselves serving with 16 Air Assault Brigade, 7 Armoured Brigade (the Desert Rats) and 3 Commando Brigade as NBC specialists, before switching roles to infantry "peace support" operations once Saddam Hussein's regime had collapsed. The squadron also provided individual replacements for Operation Herrick in Afghanistan.

Following the Army 2020 review, the squadron's role became that of light cavalry: providing a rapidly deployable force with fast mobility and substantial firepower as part of the British Army's combat arm. Its soldiers provide reconnaissance, reassurance, security and, if the situation demands it, decisive tactical effects by raiding and attacking the enemy. This role was further defined to that of a recce or 'sabre' squadron in the ongoing 2021 Future Soldier reforms that witnessed the Royal Yeomanry's resubordination to the 3rd (United Kingdom) Division under the newly raised 1st Deep Recce Strike Brigade Combat Team to be completed by October 2023. As a result the squadron's designation also changed from Command and Support to F Squadron with effect from January 2023.

The squadron's most recent deployment was as a troop in support of the 1st The Queen's Dragoon Guards on Operation Cabrit in 2020/21 for a six month rotation in Estonia and Poland as part of NATO Enhanced Forward Presence. Since its resubordination the Squadron continues to contribute to and support 1st Deep Recce Strike Brigade Combat Team operations by providing contingents or individual augmentees.

== Uniforms and insignia ==
The Imperial Yeomanry's service dress was Khaki with a Slouch hat, officially replaced by a Service cap in 1906. Thanks to Col Burns' links to King Edward VII, the regimental flash worn on the pagri of the Slouch hat and later Wolseley helmet consisted, with Royal permission, of the King's horseracing colours of purple, gold and red (still used today for the WD's stable belt, see above). However, when the regiment marched into Palestine with XX Corps in 1917 the flash may have been changed to red, white and blue.

The regiment's full dress uniform was a scarlet Dragoon tunic with purple facings, blue overalls (tight fitting cavalry trousers) or pantaloons with a single yellow stripe, and a white metal Dragoon helmet with purple plume. The unique plume was changed to white in 1910, shortly after King Edward's funeral, when a detachment of Westminster Dragoons lined the street at Marble Arch: it is thought that the purple dye had run in the rain.

The other ranks' cap and collar badge was the pre-1965 Coat of arms of the City of Westminster, with portcullis and Tudor rose, but the officers – many of whom had served in the Royal Dragoons – wore a gold-embroidered staff badge used by that regiment before the Battle of Waterloo (see above). The plate on the original dragoon helmet bore the figure 2 (for 2nd CoL Yeomanry) surrounded by the Garter, with the letters IY beneath.

At Gallipoli in 1915 the dismounted 1/2nd CoLY wore khaki serge infantry uniforms and webbing equipment with a Wolseley helmet carrying the regimental flash; the only concession was that the puttee tapes were fastened at the bottom, cavalry style. When the regiment rode into Palestine in 1917 the serge tunic was replaced in hot weather with a blue-grey shirt, and brown leather cavalry equipment was worn.

The black beret became the official headgear of the Royal Tank Corps in 1926 and was thereafter also adopted by the Westminster Dragoons. (Note: It is claimed that the Westminster Dragoons 'became (and remain to this day) the only other unit in the British Army to wear the black beret'. Although this may be true in the modern small army, where the remaining cavalry regiments of the Royal Armoured Corps have their own distinctive berets, it was not the case during World War II, when dozens of infantry battalions were converted into numbered RAC regiments, all wearing their own badges on the RAC black beret.)

== Honorary Colonels ==
The following officers have served as Honorary Colonel of the unit:

- Colonel Cuthbert Larking, appointed 7 December 1901
- Colonel Sir Charles Burn, 1st Baronet, former CO, appointed 19 November 1910
- Colonel Thomas Scott-Ellis, 8th Baron Howard de Walden, former CO, appointed 8 May 1927
- Colonel Sir Edsall Munt, former CO, appointed 5 November 1945
- General Sir Harold Pyman, appointed 5 November 1952
- Colonel Hon Sir Gordon Palmer, appointed 1969
- Colonel Edward George Aldred Kynaston, former CO, appointed 4 November 1974
- Major-General John Myles Brockbank, appointed 12 September 1978
- Major-General John Geoffrey Robyn Allen, appointed 1984
- Major-General Sir Simon Cooper, appointed 20 November 1987
- General Sir Jeremy Blacker, appointed 1 November 1997
- Lieutenant-General Sir Robert Hayman-Joyce, appointed 20 November 2002
- Lieutenant-General Barney White-Spunner, late Blues and Royals (Royal Horse Guards and 1st Dragoons), appointed 16 October 2010
- Paul Knapman, Deputy Lieutenant of Greater London, appointed 22 June 2016
- Lieutenant-General Sir Simon Mayall, appointed 1 January 2023

=== Other prominent members ===
- Trooper, later Captain, Cecil C.P. Lawson, military illustrator and regimental historian
- Raj Rajendra Narayan, later Maharaja of Cooch Behar, Lieutenant attached, 4 June 1902
- Captain John Norwood, VC, 1 February 1911
- Sir Simeon Stuart, 7th Baronet, Major, 1 October 1906
- Hon Osbert Eustace Vesey, nephew of Viscount de Vesci, Captain 19 November 1912
- Hon John Osmael Scott-Ellis, later 9th Baron Howard de Walden, Lieutenant 20 February 1938

== Battle honours ==
The 2nd County of London Yeomanry (Westminster Dragoons) have been awarded the following battle honours:

Second Boer War

South Africa 1902

First World War

Courtrai, France and Flanders 1918, Suvla, Scimitar Hill, Gallipoli 1915, Suez Canal, Egypt 1915–17, Gaza, El Mughar, Jerusalem, Palestine 1917–18

Second World War

Normandy Landing, Villers Bocage, Venraij, Meijel, Venlo Pocket, Roer, North-West Europe 1944–45

== See also ==
- County of London Yeomanry
- Imperial Yeomanry
- List of Yeomanry Regiments 1908
- Yeomanry
- Yeomanry order of precedence
- British yeomanry during the First World War
- Second line yeomanry regiments of the British Army

== Bibliography ==
- B. S. Barnes, The Sign of the Double 'T' (The 50th Northumbrian Division – July 1943 to December 1944), Market Weighton: Sentinel Press, 2nd Edn 2008, ISBN 978-0-9534262-0-1.
- Becke, Archibald F. (1936). Order of Battle of Divisions Part 2A. The Territorial Force Mounted Divisions and the 1st-Line Territorial Force Divisions (42–56). London: HMSO. OCLC 4405016.
- Becke, Archibald F. (1937). Order of Battle of Divisions Part 2B. The 2nd-Line Territorial Force Divisions (57th–69th) with The Home-Service Divisions (71st–73rd) and 74th and 75th Divisions. London: HMSO. OCLC 4405016.
- I. F. W. Beckett, Territorials – A Century of Service, Staplehurst, 3rd Edn 2003, ISBN 1-86227-167-4.
- John Buckley, Monty's Men: The British Army and the Liberation of Europe, London: Yale University Press, 2013, ISBN 978-0-300-13449-0.
- René Chartrand, 'The Westminster Dragoons in the First World War', Journal of the Society for Army Historical Research, Autumn 2019, Vol. 97, pp. 213–21.
- Richard Doherty, Hobart's 79th Armoured Division at War: Invention, Innovation and Inspiration, Barnsley: Pen & Sword, 2011, ISBN 978-1-84884-398-1.
- Col John K. Dunlop, The Development of the British Army 1899–1914, London: Methuen, 1938.
- Major L. F. Ellis, History of the Second World War, United Kingdom Military Series: Victory in the West, Vol. I: The Battle of Normandy, London: HM Stationery Office, 1962/Uckfield: Naval & Military, 2004, ISBN 1-845740-58-0.
- George Forty, British Army Handbook 1939–1945, Stroud: Sutton, 1998, ISBN 0-7509-1403-3.
- R. G. Harris, 50 Years of Yeomanry Uniforms, Frederick Muller Ltd., London 1972, SBN 584 10937 7.
- Huw-Williams, Captain N. (1987). A Short History of the Westminster Dragoons 1901–1967 (PDF). Westminster: Westminster Dragoons.
- James, Brigadier E. A. (1978). British Regiments 1914–18. London: Samson Books Limited. ISBN 0-906304-03-2.
- Joslen, H. F. (2003) [1960]. Orders of Battle: Second World War, 1939–1945. Uckfield, East Sussex: Naval and Military Press. ISBN 978-1-84342-474-1.
- Lawson, Captain C. C. P.; Huw-Williams, Captain N. (1969). Huw-Williams, Captain N. (ed.). A History of the Westminster Dragoons 1901–1967. London. ASIN B003PB00YM.
- Norman E. H. Litchfield, The Territorial Artillery 1908–1988 (Their Lineage, Uniforms and Badges), Nottingham: Sherwood Press, 1992, ISBN 0-9508205-2-0.
- Cliff Lord & Graham Watson, Royal Corps of Signals: Unit Histories of the Corps (1920–2001) and its Antecedents, Solihull: Helion, 2003, ISBN 1-874622-92-2.
- Lt-Gen H. G. Martin, The History of the Fifteenth Scottish Division 1939–1945, Edinburgh: Blackwood, 1948/Uckfield: Naval & Military Press, 2014, ISBN 978-1-78331-085-2.
- Mileham, Patrick (1994). The Yeomanry Regiments; 200 Years of Tradition. Edinburgh: Canongate Academic. ISBN 1-898410-36-4.
- Rinaldi, Richard A (2008). Order of Battle of the British Army 1914. Ravi Rikhye. ISBN 978-0-97760728-0.
- Col H. C. B. Rogers, The Mounted Troops of the British Army 1066–1945, London: Seeley Service, 1959.
- Lt-Col Ernest Ryan, 'The Post-South African War Yeomanry', Journal of the Society for Army Historical Research, June 1960, Vol. 38, pp. 57–62.
- R. J. Smith, The Yeomanry Force at the 1911 Coronation, ISBN 0-948251-26-3.
- Edward M. Spiers, The Army and Society 1815–1914, London: Longmans, 1980, ISBN 0-582-48565-7.
- Westlake, Ray (1996). British Regiments at Gallipoli. Barnsley: Leo Cooper. ISBN 0-85052-511-X.
- Order of Battle of the British Armies in France, November 11th, 1918. France: General Staff, GHQ. 1918.
