= Hugh Wyld =

English cricketer

Personal information
- Full name: Hugh James Wyld
- Born: 16 April 1880; Kensington, London, England
- Died: 9 December 1961 (aged 81); Beverstone, Gloucestershire, England
- Batting: Right-handed
- Bowling: Slow left-arm orthodox
- Relatives: Wilfred Hill-Wood (son-in-law)

Domestic team information
- Years: Team
- 1900–1903: Oxford University
- 1900–1901: Middlesex
- 1900–1905: Marylebone Cricket Club
- 1899: Buckinghamshire

Career statistics
Competition	First-class
Matches	36
Runs scored	1,124
Batting average	18.73
100s/50s	–/5
Top score	85
Balls bowled	72
Wickets	2
Bowling average	21.00
5 wickets in innings	–
10 wickets in match	–
Best bowling	1/10
Catches/stumpings	21/–
- Source: Cricinfo, 31 August 2011

Major Hugh James Wyld T.D. (16 April 1880 – 9 December 1961) was an English cricketer. Wyld was a right-handed batsman who bowled slow left-arm orthodox. He was born in Kensington, London and educated at Harrow School and Magdalen College, Oxford, while later in his life he became an officer in the British Army.

== Cricket career ==
Wyld played a single Minor Counties Championship match for Buckinghamshire against Berkshire in 1899. In 1900, he made his first-class debut for Oxford University against Sussex. In that same season he also made his debut for the Marylebone Cricket Club against London County, and for Middlesex against Leicestershire in the County Championship. He played for Middlesex until the 1901 season, having made five first-class appearances for the county. It was for Oxford University that he made the majority of his first-class appearances for, playing for the university 27 times from 1900 to 1903. In his 27 first-class matches for the university, he scored 908 runs at an average of 20.17, with a high score of 85. This score, which was one of four fifties he made, came against HDG Leveson-Gower's XI in 1902. He also made three first-class appearances for the Marylebone Cricket Club and a single appearance for the Gentlemen of England.

== Military career ==
Wyld was commissioned as a 2nd lieutenant in the Hertfordshire Yeomanry on 4 March 1903. By 17 July 1908 he was a lieutenant in the Yeomanry, having been granted that rank on 20 December 1905, while by 1909 promoted to captain on 1 October of that year. On 25 August 1913, Wyld was promoted to major and was still serving in the Hertfordshire Yeomanry at this time. By 1919, Wyld was still serving in the army with the Yeomanry, having taken up a temporary position within the Territorial Force in April 1919. He left the army after resigning his commission on 22 September 1922. He retained the rank of major and held the Territorial Decoration for over twelve years service.

== Personal life ==
Wyld's daughter, Barbara, married David Hely-Hutchinson, the son of Richard Hely-Hutchinson, 6th Earl of Donoughmore on 7 June 1934. The couple had five children. Another daughter, Diana, married the cricketer Wilfred Hill-Wood on 30 April 1947. Wyld lived for part of his life at Beverstone Old Rectory, it was in the Gloucestershire village of Beverstone that he died on 9 December 1961.
