= 1st Composite Mounted Brigade =

- Active: September 1915–December 1915
- Country: United Kingdom
- Branch: British Army
- Type: Dismounted Yeomanry
- Size: Brigade
- Engagements: World War I: Gallipoli 1915

The 1st Composite Mounted Brigade was a formation of the British Army in World War I. It was formed by the 2nd Mounted Division during the Gallipoli Campaign on 4 September 1915 by absorbing the 1st South Midland, 2nd South Midland and 5th Mounted Brigades. The brigade was dissolved on return to Egypt in December 1915.

== Formation ==
Due to losses during the Battle of Scimitar Hill and wastage during August 1915, the 2nd Mounted Division had to be reorganised. On 4 September 1915, the 1st Composite Mounted Brigade was formed from 1st (1st South Midland), 2nd (2nd South Midland) and 5th (Yeomanry) Mounted Brigades. Each dismounted brigade formed a battalion sized unit:

1st South Midland Regiment (Warwickshire, Gloucestershire and Worcestershire Yeomanry)
2nd South Midland Regiment (Buckinghamshire, Dorset and Berkshire Yeomanry)
5th Yeomanry Regiment (Hertfordshire and 2nd County of London Yeomanry)

The brigade was commanded by Br-Gen E.A.Wiggin, former commander of the 1st South Midlands Mounted Brigade. The 2nd Composite Mounted Brigade was formed at the same time with the 3rd and 4th Regiments.

== Dissolved ==
The brigade left Suvla on 31 October 1915 for Mudros. It left Mudros on 27 November, arrived Alexandria on 1 December and went to Mena Camp, Cairo. Each regiment had left a squadron headquarters and two troops (about 100 officers and men) in Egypt to look after the horses. The 1st South Midland, 2nd South Midland and Yeomanry Mounted Brigades were reformed on 1 December and the 1st Composite Mounted Brigade passed out of existence.

== See also ==
- 1st South Midland Mounted Brigade
- 2nd South Midland Mounted Brigade
- Yeomanry Mounted Brigade
- British yeomanry during the First World War

== Bibliography ==
- Becke, Major A.F. (1989) [1st Pub. 1936]. Order of Battle of Divisions Part 2A. The Territorial Force Mounted Divisions and the 1st-Line Territorial Force Divisions (42-56). London: His Majesty's Stationery Office. ISBN 1-871167-12-4.
- James, Brigadier E.A. (1978). British Regiments 1914–18. London: Samson Books Limited. ISBN 0-906304-03-2.
