= 13th Cavalry Brigade (British Indian Army) =

1st South Midland Mounted Brigade 1st (1st South Midland) Mounted Brigade 5th Mounted Brigade 13th Cavalry Brigade
- Active: 1908 – April 1920
- Country: United Kingdom
- Allegiance: British Crown
- Branch: British Army; British India
- Type: Yeomanry, Cavalry
- Size: Brigade
- Part of: 2nd Mounted Division; Imperial Mounted Division; 5th Cavalry Division
- HQ (peacetime): St John's, Warwick
- Engagements: First World War: Gallipoli 1915; Egypt and Palestine 1916–18

Commanders
- Notable commanders: Philip James Vandeleur Kelly

The 1st South Midland Mounted Brigade (later numbered as the 5th Mounted Brigade) was a yeomanry brigade of the British Army, formed as part of the Territorial Force in 1908.

It served dismounted in the Gallipoli Campaign before being remounted to serve in the Sinai and Palestine Campaign in the First World War.

In April 1918, it was merged with elements of the 3rd (Ambala) Cavalry Brigade to form 13th Cavalry Brigade. It remained in Palestine after the end of the war on occupation duties.

== Formation ==
Under the terms of the Territorial and Reserve Forces Act 1907 (7 Edw.7, c.9), the brigade was formed in 1908 as part of the Territorial Force. It consisted of three yeomanry regiments, a horse artillery battery and ammunition column, a transport and supply column and a field ambulance.

As the name suggests, the units were drawn from the southern part of the English Midlands, predominantly Gloucestershire, Warwickshire and Worcestershire.

== First World War ==
=== 1st South Midland Mounted Brigade ===
The brigade was embodied on 4 August 1914 upon the outbreak of the First World War. It moved to East Anglia and joined the 1st Mounted Division. On 2 September it was transferred to the 2nd Mounted Division and in mid November 1914 it moved with its division to Norfolk on coastal defence duties.

==== Egypt ====
In April 1915, the 2nd Mounted Division moved to Egypt, the brigade arriving at Alexandria on 24 April. In May 1915 the brigade was designated 1st (1st South Midland) Mounted Brigade.

It was dismounted in August 1915 and took part in the Gallipoli Campaign. Each regiment left a squadron headquarters and two troops (about 100 officers and men) in Egypt to look after the horses.

==== Gallipoli ====
The brigade landed at "A" Beach, Suvla Bay on the night of 17 August and moved into reserve positions at Lala Baba on the night of 20 August. On 21 August it advanced to Chocolate Hill under heavy fire and took part in the attack on Hill 112.

Due to losses during the Battle of Scimitar Hill and wastage during August 1915, the 2nd Mounted Division had to be reorganised. On 4 September 1915, the 1st Composite Mounted Brigade was formed from the 1st (1st South Midland), 2nd (2nd South Midland) and 5th (Yeomanry) Mounted Brigades. The brigade formed a battalion sized unit 1st South Midland Regiment. The brigade embarked for Mudros on 31 October and returned to Egypt in December 1915 where it was reformed and remounted.

=== 5th Mounted Brigade ===
5th Mounted Brigade
Organisation, July 1917

- Warwickshire Yeomanry
- Royal Gloucestershire Hussars
- Queen's Own Worcestershire Hussars
- 16th Machine Gun Squadron
- 5th Mounted Brigade Signal Troop
- 5th Mounted Brigade Field Ambulance, RAMC
- 5th Mounted Brigade Mobile Veterinary Section

The brigade left the 2nd Mounted Division on 3 and 4 January 1916 for Es Salhia. The brigade served as Corps Troops in Egypt from 21 January 1916. On 31 March 1916, the remaining Mounted Brigades were numbered in a single sequence. As a consequence, the 1st South Midland Mounted Brigade was redesignated as 5th Mounted Brigade on 20 April.

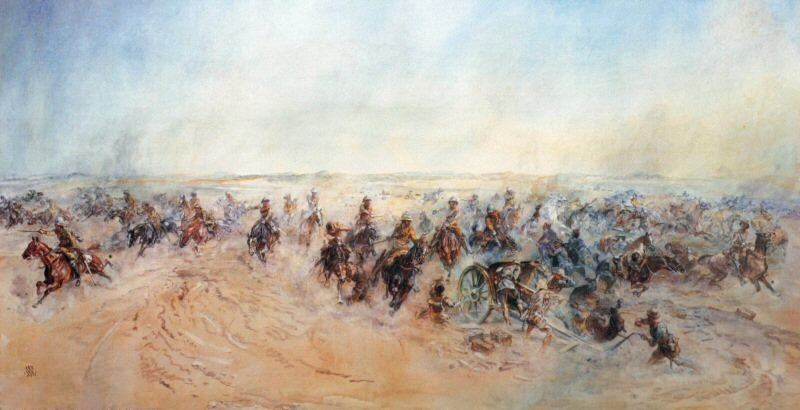
Charge at Huj, by Lady Butler

The 16th Machine Gun Squadron was formed as the Cavalry MG Squadron and joined the brigade in January 1917 and in the same month, the brigade joined the newly formed Imperial Mounted Division. With the division, it took part in the First and Second Battles of Gaza.

The brigade remained with the Imperial Mounted Division when it was renamed Australian Mounted Division on 30 June 1917. With the division, it took part in the Third Battle of Gaza including the Capture of Beersheba and the Battle of Mughar Ridge. It also resisted the Turkish counter-attacks in the Turkish Defence of Jerusalem. Three of the brigade's squadrons took part in the charge at Huj, the last British cavalry charge against enemy guns.

=== 13th Cavalry Brigade ===
13th Cavalry Brigade
Organisation, September 1918

- Royal Gloucestershire Hussars
- 9th Hodson's Horse
- 18th King George's Own Lancers
- 19th Machine Gun Squadron
- 13th Cavalry Brigade Signal Troop
- 13th Combined Cavalry Field Ambulance, RAMC
- 13th Mobile Veterinary Section

In March 1918, the 2nd Indian Cavalry Division was broken up in France. The Canadian (Canadian Cavalry Brigade) and British units (notably 7th Dragoon Guards, 8th Hussars and N and X Batteries RHA) remained in France and the Indian elements were sent to Egypt.

By an Egyptian Expeditionary Force GHQ Order of 12 April 1918, the mounted troops of the EEF were reorganised when the Indian Army units arrived in theatre. On 24 April 1918, the 2nd Mounted Division (Note: Not to be confused with the original 2nd Mounted Division that fought dismounted at Gallipoli.) was formed on the Indian Establishment (Note: British Indian Army standard whereby brigades only retained one British regiment or battalion and most support units were Indian (artillery excepted).) and the 5th Mounted Brigade was assigned to it.

On 24 April 1918, the 5th Mounted Brigade was merged with elements of the 3rd (Ambala) Cavalry Brigade:

- the Royal Gloucestershire Hussars remained with the brigade
- the Warwickshire Yeomanry left the brigade and was merged with the South Nottinghamshire Hussars (of 7th Mounted Brigade) to form B Battalion, Machine Gun Corps. It was posted to France, arriving in June
- the Queen's Own Worcestershire Hussars left the brigade on 5 May and became the XX Corps Cavalry Regiment
- 9th Hodson's Horse joined from 3rd (Ambala) Cavalry Brigade
- 18th King George's Own Lancers joined from 3rd (Ambala) Cavalry Brigade
- 16th Machine Gun Squadron remained with the brigade (but appears to have been renumbered)
- 5th Mounted Brigade Signal Troop remained with the brigade
- in April, 5th Mounted Brigade Field Ambulance merged with Ambala Cavalry Field Ambulance to form 5th Combined Cavalry Field Ambulance
- in April, 5th Mounted Brigade Mobile Veterinary Section merged with Ambala Mobile Veterinary Section to form 5th Cavalry Mobile Veterinary Section

On 22 July 1918, the 2nd Mounted Division was renumbered as the 5th Cavalry Division and the brigade as 13th Cavalry Brigade. The sub units (Signal Troop, Combined Cavalry Field Ambulance and Mobile Veterinary Section) were renumbered on the same date.

The brigade remained with 5th Cavalry Division for the rest of the war, taking part in the Affair of Abu Tellul, Battle of Megiddo, Capture of Damascus, and Occupation of Aleppo.

After the Armistice of Mudros, the brigade remained with 5th Cavalry Division in Palestine as part of the occupation forces. However, demobilization began immediately: the 14th Cavalry Brigade was broken up in September 1919, the 15th (Imperial Service) Cavalry Brigade in January 1920, and the rest of the division (and the brigade) in April 1920.

== Commanders ==
The 1st South Midland Mounted Brigade / 5th Mounted Brigade / 13th Cavalry Brigade had the following commanders:

| From | Rank | Name |
|---|---|---|
| 28 June 1914 | Colonel | E.A. Wiggin (until 4 September 1915) (Note: Brigade was absorbed in 1st Composite Mounted Brigade 4 September to 1 December 1915; Brigadier-General Wiggin took command of 1st Composite.) |
| 5 August 1914 | Brigadier-General | E.A. Wiggin (until 4 September 1915) |
| 1 December 1915 | Brigadier-General | E.A. Wiggin |
| October 1917 | Brigadier-General | P.D. FitzGerald, DSO, psc |
| 4 December 1917 | Brigadier-General | P.J.V. Kelly, CMG, DSO |
| 7 October 1918 | Brigadier-General | G.A. Weir, DSO |

== See also ==
- 13th Indian Cavalry Brigade existed at the same time but was unrelated other than having the same number
- 2/1st South Midland Mounted Brigade for the 2nd Line formation.
- British yeomanry during the First World War

== Bibliography ==
- Becke, Archibald F. (1936). Order of Battle of Divisions Part 2A. The Territorial Force Mounted Divisions and the 1st-Line Territorial Force Divisions (42–56). London: HMSO. OCLC 4405016.
- James, Brigadier E.A. (1978). British Regiments 1914–18. London: Samson Books Limited. ISBN 0-906304-03-2.
- Perry, F.W. (1992). Order of Battle of Divisions Part 5A. The Divisions of Australia, Canada and New Zealand and those in East Africa. Newport: Ray Westlake Military Books. ISBN 1-871167-25-6.
- Perry, F.W. (1993). Order of Battle of Divisions Part 5B. Indian Army Divisions. Newport: Ray Westlake Military Books. ISBN 1-871167-23-X.
- Rinaldi, Richard A (2008). Order of Battle of the British Army 1914. Ravi Rikhye. ISBN 978-0-97760728-0.
- Westlake, Ray (1992). British Territorial Units 1914-18. Osprey Publishing. ISBN 978-1-85532-168-7.
- Westlake, Ray (1996). British Regiments at Gallipoli. Barnsley: Leo Cooper. ISBN 0-85052-511-X.
