= 2nd Composite Mounted Brigade =

- Active: September 1915–December 1915
- Country: United Kingdom
- Branch: British Army
- Type: Dismounted Yeomanry
- Size: Brigade
- Engagements: World War I Gallipoli 1915

The 2nd Composite Mounted Brigade was a formation of the British Army in World War I. It was formed by the 2nd Mounted Division during the Gallipoli Campaign on 4 September 1915 by absorbing the Nottinghamshire and Derbyshire and London Mounted Brigades. The brigade was dissolved on return to Egypt in December 1915.

== Formation ==
Due to losses during the Battle of Scimitar Hill and wastage during August 1915, the 2nd Mounted Division had to be reorganised. On 4 September 1915, the 2nd Composite Mounted Brigade was formed from the 3rd (Notts and Derby) and 4th (London) Mounted Brigades. Each dismounted brigade formed a battalion sized unit:

3rd Nottinghamshire and Derbyshire Regiment (Sherwood Rangers, South Notts Hussars and Derbyshire Yeomanry)
4th London Regiment (1st County of London, City of London and 3rd County of London Yeomanry)

The brigade was commanded by Br-Gen A.H.M. Taylor, former commander of the London Mounted Brigade. The 1st Composite Mounted Brigade was formed at the same time with the 1st, 2nd and 5th Regiments.

== Dissolved ==
The brigade left Suvla on 2 November 1915 for Mudros. It left Mudros on 24 November, arrived Alexandria on 28 November and went to Mena Camp, Cairo. Each regiment had left a squadron headquarters and two troops (about 100 officers and men) in Egypt to look after the horses. The Nottinghamshire and Derbyshire and the London Mounted Brigades were reformed on 1 December and the 2nd Composite Mounted Brigade passed out of existence.

== See also ==
- Nottinghamshire and Derbyshire Mounted Brigade
- London Mounted Brigade
- British yeomanry during the First World War

== Bibliography ==
- Becke, Major A.F. (1988). Order of Battle of Divisions Part 2A. The Territorial Force Mounted Divisions and the 1st-Line Territorial Force Divisions (42-56) (Reprint ed.). London: His Majesty's Stationery Office. ISBN 1-871167-12-4.
- James, Brigadier E.A. (1978). British Regiments 1914–18. London: Samson Books Limited. ISBN 0-906304-03-2.
