= 3rd County of London Yeomanry (Sharpshooters) =

British Territorial Army unit

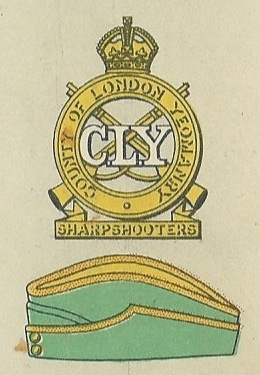
- Badge and service cap as worn at the outbreak of the Second World War
- Active: 23 July 1901 – 1 May 1961
- Country: United Kingdom
- Branch: British Army
- Type: Yeomanry (First World War); Royal Armoured Corps (Second World War)
- Size: Three Regiments (First World War); Two Regiments (Second World War)
- Garrison/HQ: Allitsen Road, St John's Wood
- Engagements: First World War Gallipoli 1915 Egypt 1915–16 Macedonia 1916–17 Palestine 1917–18 France and Flanders 1918 Second World War North Africa 1941–43 Sicily 1943 Italy 1943 North-West Europe 1944–45

Commanders
- Notable commanders: William Onslow, 6th Earl of Onslow

The 3rd County of London Yeomanry (Sharpshooters) was a Yeomanry regiment of the British Army. It was raised in 1901 from Second Boer War veterans of the Imperial Yeomanry. During the First World War it served dismounted at Gallipoli, was remounted to serve in Macedonia, Egypt and Palestine, before being converted to machine gunners for service on the Western Front. 2nd and 3rd Line units remained in the United Kingdom throughout.

Between the wars, it was converted to an Armoured Car Company before being expanded back to regimental size and forming a duplicate regiment, the 4th County of London Yeomanry (Sharpshooters). Both regiments served throughout the North African Campaign (notably at El Alamein), before moving on to Sicily (3rd CLY) and Italy. Both regiments returned to the United Kingdom in time to prepare for the opening of the Second Front.

Due to losses, and a shortage of replacement personnel and equipment, the regiments were amalgamated in August 1944 as 3rd/4th County of London Yeomanry (Sharpshooters). The regiment went on to serve throughout the North-West Europe Campaign, ending the war in Germany.

Post-war, 3rd/4th County of London Yeomanry (Sharpshooters) reformed as a Territorial Army armoured regiment in 1947. In 1961 the regiment merged with the Kent Yeomanry to form the Kent and Sharpshooters Yeomanry.

== Imperial Yeomanry ==
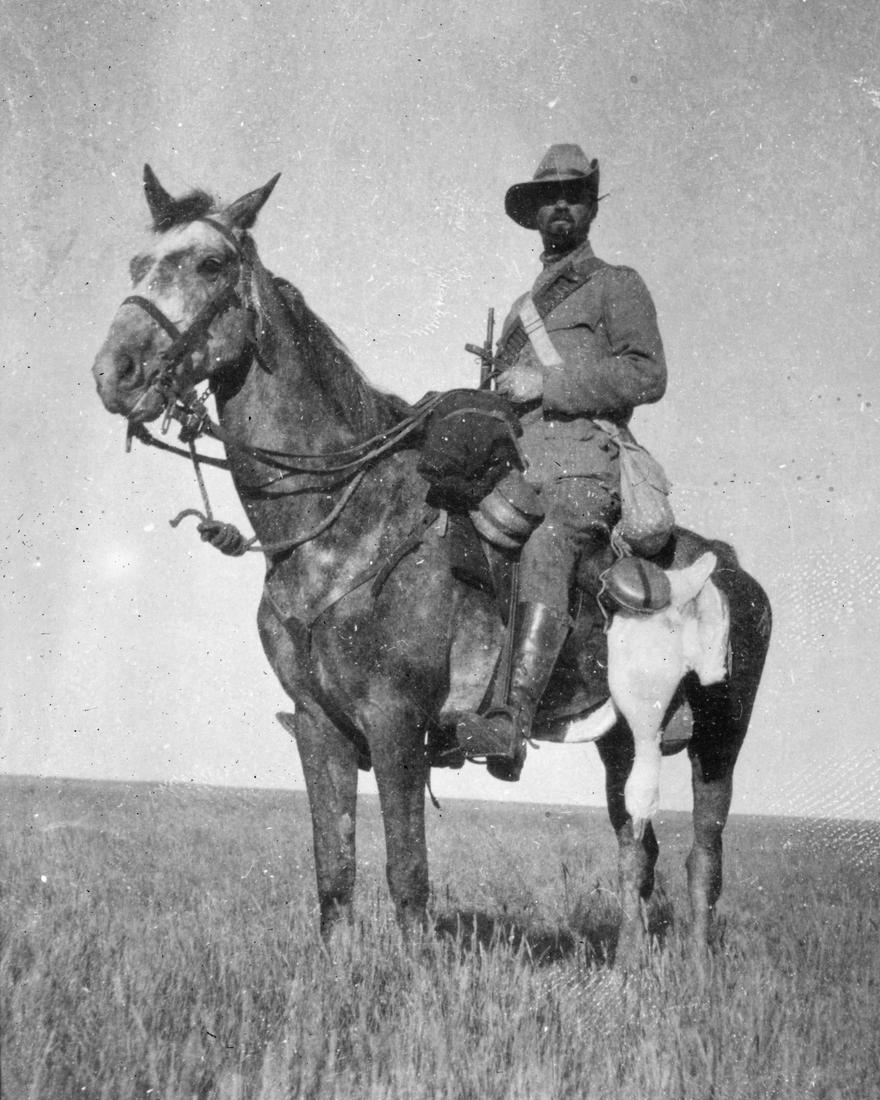
A typical Imperial Yeoman on campaign

On 13 December 1899, the decision to allow volunteer forces serve in the Second Boer War was made. Due to the string of defeats during Black Week in December 1899, the British government realised that they were going to need more troops than just the regular army, thus issuing a Royal Warrant on 24 December 1899. This warrant officially created the Imperial Yeomanry. At the suggestion of Henry Seton-Karr, MP, the 18th Battalion was raised on 7 March 1900, funded by the Earl of Dunraven and designated as "Sharpshooters". Unlike most IY battalions, which were formed from the existing Yeomanry regiments providing service companies of approximately 115 men each, the Sharpshooters were selected from volunteers who could prove their skill with a rifle and their horsemanship. The 18th Battalion comprised 67th, 71st and 75th (Sharpshooters) Companies recruited in London and 70th (Scottish or HQ) Company recruited in Scotland.

The battalion was formally inspected by the Prince of Wales outside Chelsea Barracks on 29 March 1900, and left Southampton on the SS Galeka in early April, arriving in South Africa later the same month.

The experiment was considered a success, and in 1901 three further battalions were raised by the Sharpshooters Committee:

- 21st (2nd Sharpshooters) Battalion – raised 9 March
  - 80th–83rd (Sharpshooters) Companies
- 23rd (3rd Sharpshooters) Battalion – raised 5 March
  - 90th–93rd (Sharpshooters) Companies
- 25th (Sharpshooters) Battalion – raised 19 October
  - 115th–118th (Sharpshooters) Companies

On 23 July 1901, the 3rd County of London Imperial Yeomanry (Sharpshooters) was formed from South African War veterans to perpetuate the 18th, 21st and 23rd Battalions, IY:

- Regimental Headquarters (RHQ) at Cockspur Street, London, moving to Regent's Park in 1901
- A Squadron: from veterans of 18th Battalion
- B Squadron: from veterans of 21st and 23rd Battalions, incorporating the Mounted Infantry Company of the 1st Middlesex (Victoria and St George's) Volunteer Rifles
- C Squadron: from 'other yeomen and ex-soldiers'
- D Squadron: from new recruits
- Machine Gun Section

== Territorial Force ==
On 1 April 1908, the regiment was renamed as the 3rd County of London Yeomanry (Sharpshooters) and transferred to the Territorial Force, trained and equipped as hussars. In 1912, the regiment moved to Henry Street (renamed Allitsen Road in 1938) in St John's Wood. It was ranked as 48th (of 55) in the order of precedence of the Yeomanry Regiments in the Army List of 1914. It was assigned to the London Mounted Brigade.

== First World War ==
In accordance with the Territorial and Reserve Forces Act 1907 (7 Edw. 7, c.9) which brought the Territorial Force into being, the TF was intended to be a home defence force for service during wartime and members could not be compelled to serve outside the country. However, on the outbreak of war on 4 August 1914, many members volunteered for Imperial Service. Therefore, TF units were split in August and September 1914 into 1st Line (liable for overseas service) and 2nd Line (home service for those unable or unwilling to serve overseas) units. Later, a 3rd Line was formed to act as a reserve, providing trained replacements for the 1st and 2nd Line regiments.

=== 1/3rd County of London Yeomanry (Sharpshooters) ===
The 1st Line regiment mobilized with its brigade and concentrated in Berkshire at the outbreak of war. It joined 2nd Mounted Division on 2 September and moved with the division to East Anglia in November 1914.

On 14 April 1915, the regiment departed Avonmouth for Egypt, arriving at Alexandria on 27 April. It was posted to the Suez Canal Defences (near Ismaïlia) by the middle of May and its parent brigade was designated 4th (London) Mounted Brigade. The regiment was dismounted in August 1915 for service in the Gallipoli Campaign. It left a squadron headquarters and two troops (about 100 officers and men) in Egypt to look after the horses.

The regiment landed at Suvla Bay on the morning of 18 August and moved into reserve positions at Karakol Dagh. It moved to "C" Beach, Lala Baba on 20 August. On 21 August it advanced to Chocolate Hill under heavy fire and took part in the attack on Hill 112. Due to losses during the Battle of Scimitar Hill and wastage during August 1915, the 2nd Mounted Division had to be reorganised. On 4 September 1915, the 2nd Composite Mounted Brigade was formed from the 3rd (Notts and Derby) and 4th (London) Mounted Brigades. The regiment formed part of a battalion sized unit 4th London Regiment. The regiment embarked for Mudros on 2 November and, in December 1915, returned to Egypt, where it was reformed and remounted.

The regiment (and its brigade) left the 2nd Mounted Division on 18 January 1916 and was sent to Abbassia. It once again served as part of the Suez Canal Defences. In March 1916, the brigade was redesignated as 8th Mounted Brigade. From November 1916 to June 1917, the regiment took part in the Salonika Campaign, serving as GHQ Troops with the British Salonika Army.

The regiment arrived back in Egypt from Salonika with its brigade on 8 June 1917. It moved forward and joined the newly formed Yeomanry Mounted Division on 21 July 1917 at el Fuqari. From 31 October, it took part in the Third Battle of Gaza, including the Battle of Beersheba and the Capture of the Sheria Position. It took part in the Battle of Mughar Ridge on 13 and 14 November and the Battle of Nebi Samwil for 17 to 24 November. From 27 to 29 November, it withstood the Turkish counter-attacks during the Capture of Jerusalem.

In March 1918, the 1st Indian Cavalry Division was broken up in France. The British units (notably 6th (Inniskilling) Dragoons, 17th Lancers, 1/1st Queen's Own Yorkshire Dragoons and A, Q and U Batteries RHA) remained in France and the Indian elements were sent to Egypt. By an Egyptian Expeditionary Force GHQ Order of 12 April 1918, the mounted troops of the EEF were reorganised when the Indian Army units arrived in theatre. On 24 April 1918, the Yeomanry Mounted Division was indianized (Note: British divisions were converted to the British Indian Army standard whereby brigades only retained one British regiment or battalion and most support units were Indian (artillery excepted).) and its title was changed to 1st Mounted Division, the third distinct division to bear this title. (Note: See 1st Mounted Division and 3rd Mounted Division.)

On 24 April 1918, the 8th Mounted Brigade was merged with elements of the 8th (Lucknow) Cavalry Brigade: the Sharpshooters and the City of London Yeomanry (Rough Riders) left the brigade on 7 April and were merged to form E Battalion, Machine Gun Corps. They were replaced by 29th Lancers (Deccan Horse) and 36th Jacob's Horse from 8th (Lucknow) Cavalry Brigade.

E Battalion, MGC was posted to France, arriving on 1 June 1918. On 17 August 1918, it was renumbered as 103rd (City & 3rd Cty. of London Yeo.) Battalion, Machine Gun Corps. It remained on the Western Front for the rest of the war. At the Armistice, it was serving as Army Troops with the First Army.

=== 2/3rd County of London Yeomanry (Sharpshooters) ===
The 2nd Line regiment was formed in London in August 1914. By March 1915, it was with 2/1st London Mounted Brigade in 2/2nd Mounted Division and was at Norwich in Norfolk. On 31 March 1916, the remaining Mounted Brigades were ordered to be numbered in a single sequence; the brigade was numbered as 12th Mounted Brigade and the division as 3rd Mounted Division.

In July 1916, the regiment was converted to a cyclist unit in 4th Cyclist Brigade, 1st Cyclist Division and was stationed at North Walsham. In November 1916, the division was broken up and regiment was merged with the 2/1st County of London Yeomanry to form 6th (1st and 3rd County of London) Yeomanry Cyclist Regiment in 2nd Cyclist Brigade, probably at Reepham. In March 1917, it resumed its identity as 2/3rd County of London Yeomanry and was at Worstead near North Walsham. By July 1917, the regiment moved to Overstrand and in 1918 to Coltishall. In May 1918, the regiment moved to Ireland and was stationed at The Curragh and Athlone, still in 2nd Cyclist Brigade, until the end of the war.

=== 3/3rd County of London Yeomanry (Sharpshooters) ===
The 3rd Line regiment was formed in 1915 and in the summer it was affiliated to a Reserve Cavalry Regiment in Eastern Command. In the summer of 1916, it was affiliated to the 9th Reserve Cavalry Regiment at The Curragh. Early in 1917, it was absorbed into the 2nd Reserve Cavalry Regiment at The Curragh.

== Between the wars ==
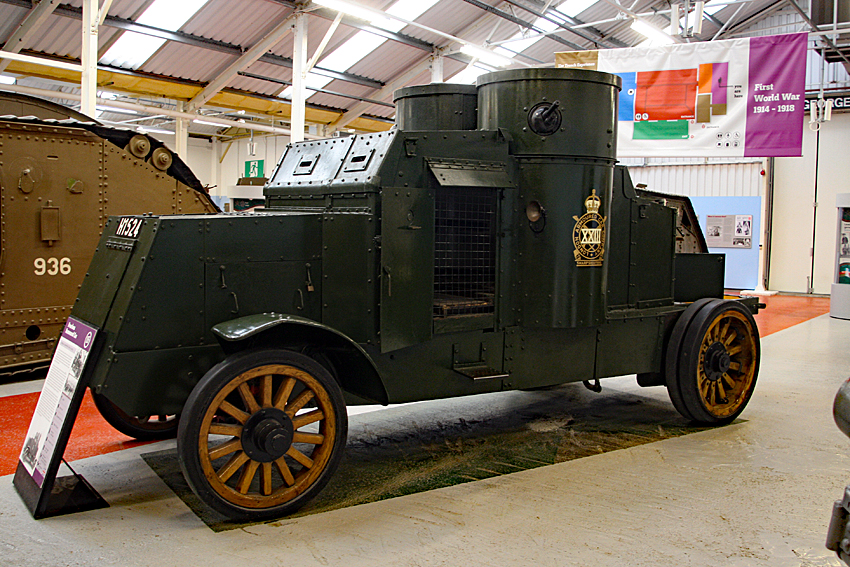
Peerless armoured car

On 7 February 1920, the Regiment was reconstituted in the Territorial Army with HQ still at St John's Wood. Following the experience of the war, it was decided that only the fourteen most senior yeomanry regiments would be retained as horsed cavalry, with the rest being transferred to other roles. As a result, on 29 September 1920, the Regiment was one of eight (Note: The eight yeomanry regiments converted to Armoured Car Companies of the Royal Tank Corps (RTC) were: 19th (Lothians and Border) Armoured Car Company, Royal Tank Corps from Lothians and Border Horse; 20th (Fife and Forfar) Armoured Car Company, Royal Tank Corps from Fife and Forfar Yeomanry; 21st (Gloucestershire Yeomanry) Armoured Car Company, Royal Tank Corps from Royal Gloucestershire Hussars; 22nd (London) Armoured Car Company (Westminster Dragoons), Royal Tank Corps from Westminster Dragoons; 23rd (London) Armoured Car Company, Royal Tank Corps from 3rd County of London Yeomanry (Sharpshooters); 24th (Derbyshire Yeomanry) Armoured Car Company, Royal Tank Corps from Derbyshire Yeomanry; 25th (Northamptonshire Yeomanry) Armoured Car Company, Royal Tank Corps from Northamptonshire Yeomanry; 26th (East Riding of York Yeomanry) Armoured Car Company, Royal Tank Corps from East Riding Yeomanry) converted and reduced to 5th (London) Armoured Car Company, Tank Corps. In June 1922, it was renumbered as the 23rd (London) Armoured Car Company, Royal Tank Corps and on 30 April 1939 it was transferred to the Royal Armoured Corps.

By 1939, it had become clear that a new European war was likely to break out, and the doubling of the Territorial Army was authorised, with each unit forming a duplicate. The Sharpshooters was expanded to an armoured regiment and on 24 August 1939 regained its original title as the 3rd County of London Yeomanry (Sharpshooters). On 29 September, it provided a nucleus for its duplicate 4th County of London Yeomanry (Sharpshooters).

== Second World War ==
=== 3rd County of London Yeomanry (Sharpshooters) ===
The two regiments had very similar histories during the Second World War until September 1942. In September 1939, the 3rd and 4th CLY were assigned to the 22nd Heavy Armoured Brigade – 22nd Armoured Brigade from April 1940 – along with the 2nd Royal Gloucestershire Hussars (2nd RGH). Initially in Southern Command, the brigade joined the 2nd Armoured Division in January 1940 and the 1st Armoured Division in October 1940. The regiment remained in the United Kingdom until moving to North Africa in October 1941.

Both regiments took part in Operation Crusader (18 November–30 December 1941), the Battle of Gazala (26 May – 21 June 1942), and the First Battle of El Alamein (1–27 July 1942) as part of the 1st and 7th Armoured Divisions. On 16 September 1942, the 3rd CLY left the 22nd Armoured Brigade and was placed under command of GHQ, British Troops in Egypt. It was posted to Mareopolis and then Khatatba where it underwent training and was refitted. The regiment spent the early part of 1943 in routine training and conversion to the Sherman tank.

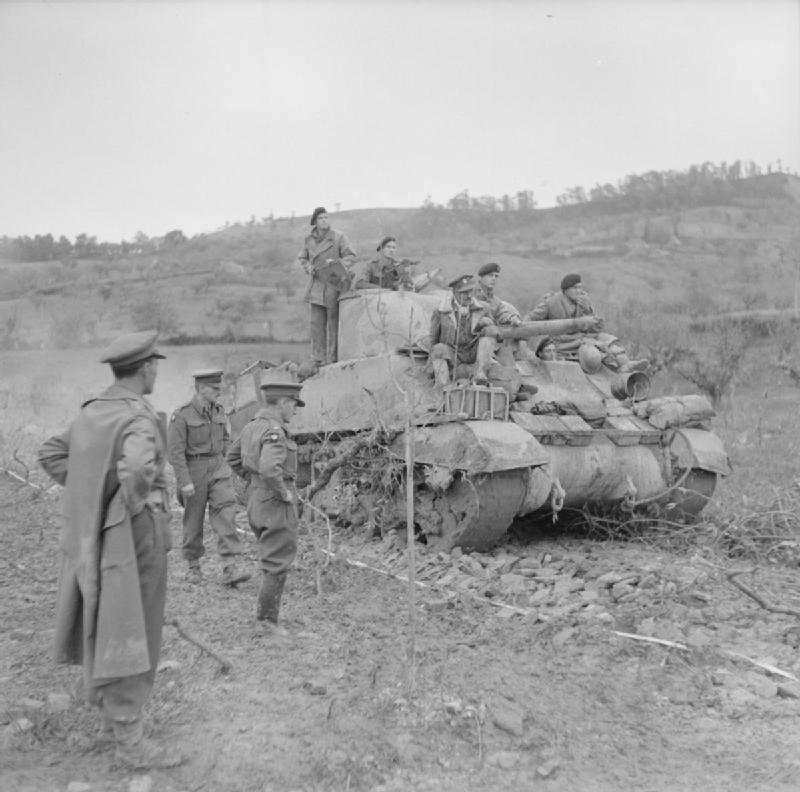
A Sherman tank of 3rd CLY negotiates a newly-laid road surface, constructed over soft ground by 1926 Basuto Company, Royal Pioneer Corps, in the advance towards the Sangro river, Italy, 21 November 1943.

The 3rd CLY joined the 4th Armoured Brigade on 13 July 1943 in Sicily: it was to remain with the brigade until amalgamation. As part of the British Eighth Army, the regiment took part in the landing and Allied invasion of Sicily, before moving on to take part in the Italian campaign, notably the advance across the Sangro. In January 1944, the regiment left Italy for the United Kingdom, where it prepared for the upcoming invasion of Northern France.

The regiment landed in Normandy on 7 June 1944, the day after the Normandy landings. In the following two months, it took park in Operation Epsom (26 June – 2 July) and the Battle for Caen, the attempts by the British Second Army to seize the German-occupied city of Caen.

Due to losses sustained, particularly by 4th CLY in the Battle of Villers-Bocage, the two Sharpshooters regiments were amalgamated on 1 August 1944 at Carpiquet to form 3rd/4th County of London Yeomanry (Sharpshooters).

=== 4th County of London Yeomanry (Sharpshooters) ===
The 4th CLY was formed on 27 September 1939 as a duplicate of – and from a nucleus of – the 3rd CLY. It shared its title with an earlier regiment, but was otherwise unconnected.

On formation, it was assigned to the 22nd Armoured Brigade and its early actions mirrored that of the 3rd CLY, taking part in Operation Crusader, the Battle of Gazala, and the First Battle of El Alamein as part of the 1st and 7th Armoured Divisions. In September 1942, 3rd CLY and 2nd RGH left the brigade and were replaced by the 1st and 5th Royal Tank Regiments. 4th CLY remained with 22nd Armoured Brigade and 7th Armoured Division until amalgamation.

The regiment particularly distinguished themselves in the Second Battle of El Alamein (23 October–11 November 1942) and took part in the subsequent advance into Tunisia (17 November 1942 – 13 May 1943). It did not take part in the Sicilian campaign but landed in Italy in September 1943. It participated in the Italian campaign in the capture of Naples and the crossing of the Volturno. In December 1943, the regiment left Italy for the United Kingdom where it prepared for the upcoming invasion of North West Europe.

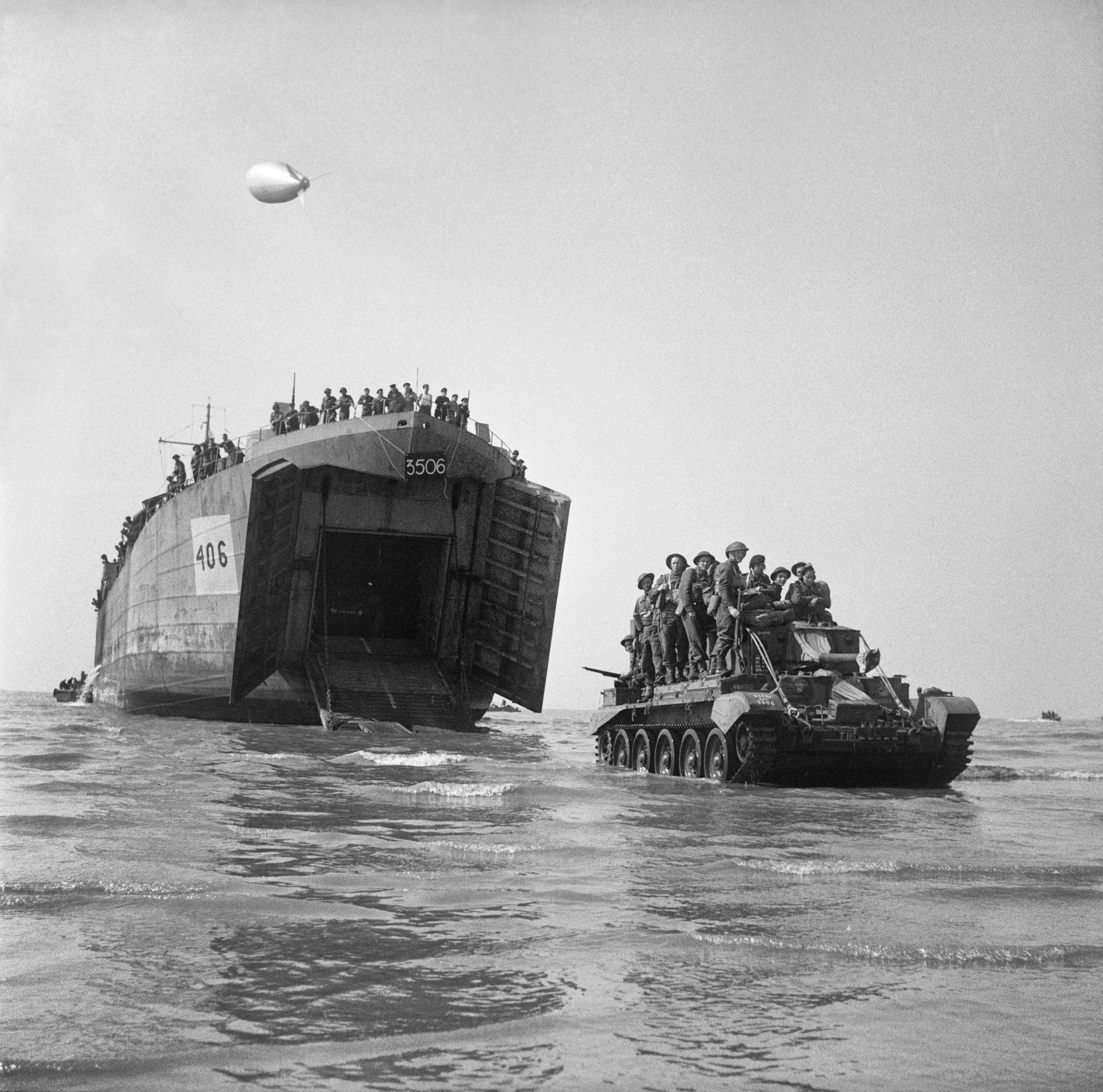
A Cromwell Mk IV tank of the 4th County of London Yeomanry with infantry aboard, comes ashore from an LST, Normandy, 7 June 1944.

The regiment landed in Normandy on 7 June 1944. During the Battle of Normandy, 4th CLY served as part of the 7th Armoured Division. On 13 June, they led the advance of 22nd Armoured Brigade with A Company of 1st Battalion, Rifle Brigade (Prince Consort's Own) by road from Villers-Bocage and were ambushed by a detachment comprising five Tiger tanks. One of the Tigers, commanded by SS-Obersturmführer Michael Wittmann, cut in behind the lead squadron, cutting them off and destroying the soft-skinned vehicles of the Rifle Brigade before running into the Sharpshooters Headquarters Troop and accompanying artillery observation tanks. Wittmann is credited with up to ten of the kills before his tank was immobilised and he escaped on foot. The cut-off squadron was later forced to surrender after the arrival of a further ten Tiger tanks. These Tigers, with elements of Panzer-Lehr-Division and 2nd Panzer Division, then counter-attacked the British in the town, but lost up to eight Tigers and two Panzer IVs before the British withdrew. 4th CLY lost its commander, Lieutenant Colonel The Viscount Cranley, and second-in-command; "A" Squadron was destroyed. 4 CLY's losses for the day amounted to 20 Cromwells, four 17-pounder Shermans, three Humber scout cars, three Stuart light tanks and a half-track.

The lost squadron was reformed within a week and the Regiment fought through to the amalgamation, taking part in Operation Goodwood.

Due to losses sustained, particularly by 4th CLY at Villers-Bocage, the two Sharpshooters regiments were amalgamated on 1 August 1944 at Carpiquet to form 3rd/4th County of London Yeomanry (Sharpshooters). The 4th CLY was replaced in 22nd Armoured Brigade by the 5th Royal Inniskilling Dragoon Guards from the 28th Armoured Brigade in the United Kingdom.

=== 3rd/4th County of London Yeomanry (Sharpshooters) ===
3rd/4th CLY was formed on 1 August 1944 at Carpiquet (near Caen) by the amalgamation of the existing Sharpshooters regiments – 3rd County of London Yeomanry (Sharpshooters) and 4th County of London Yeomanry (Sharpshooters).

The combined regiment replaced 3rd CLY in 4th Armoured Brigade, and served with it (under Brigadier – later Field Marshal – Michael Carver) for the remainder of the Second World War. It took part in Operation Bluecoat (Battle of Mont Pincon) (30 July – 9 August), Operation Market Garden (battle honour "The Nederrijn") (17 – 27 September), Operation Veritable (8 February – 10 March 1945), and Operation Plunder (crossing the Rhine) (23 March – 1 April).

== Postwar ==
In September 1946, the regiment was placed in suspended animation in Germany. It was reconstituted as 3rd/4th County of London Yeomanry (Sharpshooters) on 1 January 1947 in the Territorial Army with HQ and three squadrons in London. In 1956, B Squadron moved to Croydon and C Squadron to Harrow.

The Sharpshooters initially served as an armoured regiment in the 56th (London) Armoured Division. It changed role in 1956 as a result of TA reorganisation and became the reconnaissance regiment for the 44th (Home Counties) Infantry Division. In 1959, the affiliation with the 2nd Royal Tank Regiment ended and the 1st Royal Dragoons became the parent regiment.

In 1960, the number of Yeomanry Regiments was halved, and on 1 May 1961 the Sharpshooters was amalgamated with the Kent Yeomanry – descended from the Royal East Kent Yeomanry and the Queen's Own West Kent Yeomanry – to form the Kent and County of London Yeomanry (Sharpshooters).

== Heritage & ceremonial ==
=== Uniforms ===
On active service in South Africa the three battalions wore the standard khaki serge clothing and drab slouch hats. On reorganisation as a permanent unit in 1902, the Sharpshooters were authorised to wear a distinctive "bright dark green" full dress of hussar style with gold braiding for officers and bright yellow cording for other ranks. For review order fur busbies with green and yellow plumes were worn. Special uniforms in the unique green and yellow shades included levee order for appearance at court and mess dress for evening functions. Even khaki field service dress was brightened by green facings piped in yellow and the full dress plumes transferred from busby to slouch hat.

The colourful appearance of the regiment may have assisted recruiting but between 1902 and 1914 a number of modifications aimed at simplification and economy were adopted. These included the substitution of a more sombre shade of bluish green for dress uniforms and the issuing of the plain khaki service dress of the regular cavalry. For the remainder of its existence after 1914 the regiment wore the standard field and battle dress of the British Army, although traditional features such as the green and yellow cap (see illustration above), mess uniforms and patrol jackets were preserved where possible.

=== Battle honours ===
The 3rd, 4th and 3rd/4th County of London Yeomanry (Sharpshooters) have been awarded the following battle honours:

Second Boer War

South Africa 1900–02

First World War

Pursuit to Mons, France and Flanders 1918, Macedonia 1916–17, Suvla, Scimitar Hill, Gallipoli 1915, Egypt 1915–16, Gaza, El Mughar, Nebi Samwil, Palestine 1917–18

Second World War

Awarded to 3rd/4th CLY other than where designated: ^{3} awarded to 3rd CLY and ^{4} awarded to 4th CLY.
Villers Bocage,^{4} Odon,^{3} Defence of Rauray,^{3} Caen,^{4} Bourguébus Ridge,^{4} Falaise, Lower Maas, Rhineland, Hochwald, Rhine, Aller, North-West Europe 1944–45, Tobruk 1941,^{3,4} Bir el Gubi,^{3,4} Gabr Saleh,^{3,4} Sidi Rezegh 1941,^{3,4} Chor es Sufan,^{3,4} Gazala,^{3,4} Cauldron,^{3,4} Hagiag er Raml,^{3,4} Mersa Matruh,^{3,4} Minqar Qaim,^{3,4} Defence of Alamein Line,^{4} Deir el Shein,^{4} Ruweisat,^{4} Point 93,^{3} Ruweisat Ridge,^{3} Alam el Halfa,^{3} El Alamein,^{4} Akarit,^{4} Djebel Roumana,^{4} Tunis,^{4} North Africa 1941–43,^{3,4} Landing in Sicily,^{4} Lentini,^{4} Simeto Bridgehead,^{4} Sicily 1943,^{4} Termoli,^{3} Sangro,^{3} Fossacesia,^{3} Volturno Crossing,^{4} Italy 1943^{3,4}

== See also ==
- British yeomanry during the First World War
- County of London Yeomanry
- Imperial Yeomanry
- List of Yeomanry Regiments 1908
- Second line yeomanry regiments of the British Army
- Yeomanry order of precedence

== Bibliography ==
- Becke, Archibald Frank (2007). Order of battle of divisions ... Uckfield: Naval & Military Press. ISBN 1-847347-39-8.
- Bellis, Malcolm A. (1994). Regiments of the British Army 1939–1945 (Armour & Infantry). London: Military Press International. ISBN 0-85420-999-9.
- Delaforce, Patrick (1994). Churchill's Desert Rats: From Normandy to Berlin with the 7th Armoured Division. Stroud: Alan Sutton Publishing Ltd. ISBN 0-7509-0625-1.
- Frederick, J. B. M. (1984). Lineage book of British land forces 1660-1978 : biographical outlines of cavalry, yeomanry, armour, artillery, infantry, marines and air force land troops of regular and reserve forces (Rev. ed.). Wakefield: Microform Academic. ISBN 1-85117-007-3.
- James, E. A. (1998). British regiments, 1914-1918 (5th ed.). Dallington, Heathfield, East Sussex: Naval & Military Press. ISBN 978-1-84342-197-9.
- Joslen, H. F. (2003). Orders of battle, Second World War 1939-1945. [S.l.]: [s.n.] ISBN 1-843424-74-6.
- Mileham, Patrick (1994). The Yeomanry Regiments; 200 Years of Tradition. Edinburgh: Canongate Academic. ISBN 1-898410-36-4.
- Perry, F.W. (1993). Order of Battle of Divisions Part 5B. Indian Army Divisions. Newport: Ray Westlake Military Books. ISBN 1-871167-23-X.
- Rinaldi, Richard A (2008). Order of Battle of the British Army 1914. Ravi Rikhye. ISBN 978-0-97760728-0.
- Westlake, Ray (1996). British Regiments at Gallipoli. Barnsley: Leo Cooper. ISBN 0-85052-511-X.
- Order of Battle of the British Armies in France, November 11th, 1918. France: General Staff, GHQ. 1918.

=== External links ===
- Chris Baker, The Long, Long Trail
- T.F. Mills, Land Forces of Britain, the Empire and Commonwealth – Regiments.org (archive site)
- Cull, Robert. "War Diaries For 3rd County of London Yeomanry (3rd Sharpshooters) September 1939 To June 1946".
- Cull, Robert. "War Diaries For 4th County of London Yeomanry September 1939 To July 1944".
- "3 County of London Yeomanry (Sharpshooters)". Orders of Battle.com.
- "4 County of London Yeomanry (Sharpshooters)". Orders of Battle.com.
- "3/4 County of London Yeomanry (Sharpshooters)". Orders of Battle.com.
