= City of London Yeomanry (Rough Riders) =

British Territorial Army unit

The City of London Yeomanry (Rough Riders)
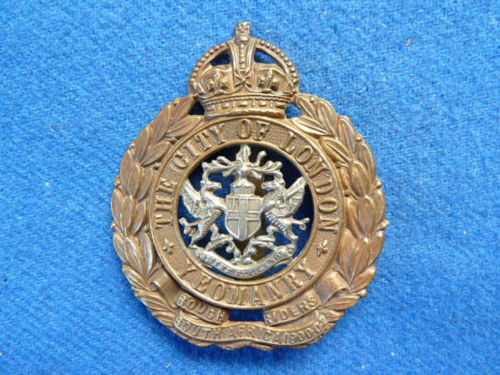
- CoLY Cap Badge
- Active: 23 July 1901 – 1 May 1961
- Country: United Kingdom
- Branch: Territorial Army
- Type: Yeomanry
- Role: Cavalry (1901); Field artillery (1920); Light Anti-Aircraft artillery (1938); Armour (1947); Infantry (1956); Signals (1969)
- Size: Regiment
- Garrison/HQ: 39 Finsbury Square; 130 Bunhill Row
- Nickname: The Roughs
- Patron: Her Majesty Queen Elizabeth the Queen Mother (1952)
- Mottos: Domine Dirige Nos (Lord, direct us)
- Mascot: The Lobster
- Engagements: Second Boer War; First World War Gallipoli 1915 Egypt 1915–16 Macedonia 1916–17 Palestine 1917–18 France and Flanders 1918 Second World War The Blitz North Africa Italy

Commanders
- Notable commanders: Richard Colvin; Frederick Maitland, 14th Earl of Lauderdale; Goland Clarke

The City of London Yeomanry (Rough Riders) was a yeomanry regiment of the British Territorial Army, formed in 1901 from veterans of the Second Boer War. In the First World War it served dismounted in the Gallipoli Campaign but reverted to the mounted role in the Senussi campaign, at Salonika and in Palestine. It ended the war as a machine gun unit on the Western Front. In the interwar years it was reduced to a battery in a composite Royal Horse Artillery unit in London, but in the period of rearmament before the Second World War it was expanded into a full regiment of light anti-aircraft artillery. It served in this role during The Blitz and later in the Tunisian and Italian campaigns. Postwar it became an armoured regiment. It amalgamated with the Inns of Court Regiment to form the Inns of Court & City Yeomanry in 1961. The lineage is maintained by 68 (Inns of Court & City Yeomanry) Signal Squadron, part of 71 (Yeomanry) Signal Regiment.

== Imperial Yeomanry ==
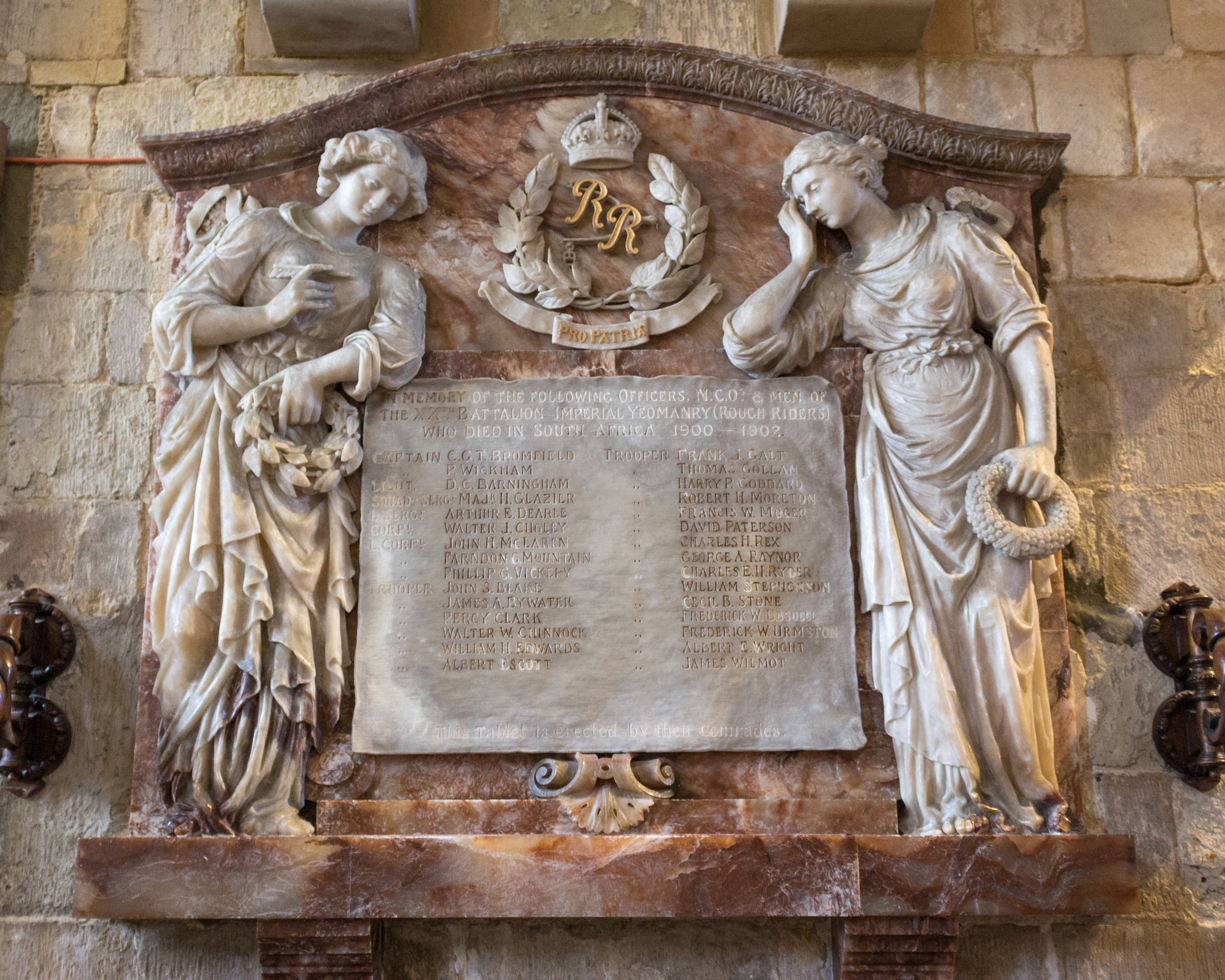
Memorial to the 20th (Rough Riders) Battalion, Imperial Yeomanry in the Second Boer War, located in Waltham Abbey Church

Following a string of defeats during Black Week in early December 1899, the British government realised that it would need additional troops to help the Regular army fight the Second Boer War. On 13 December, the decision to allow volunteer forces to serve in the field was made, and a Royal Warrant was issued on 24 December. This officially created the Imperial Yeomanry (IY). The force was organised as county service companies of approximately 115 men signed up for one year, and volunteers from existing Yeomanry Cavalry regiments and civilians (usually middle and upper class) quickly filled the new force, which was equipped to operate as Mounted infantry.

The 20th (Rough Riders) Battalion, IY, was raised on 17 March 1900 in the City of London by the Earl of Lathom as a corps specially suited to combating the Boers' 'Rough Rider' irregular cavalry tactics (the title referenced Theodore Roosevelt's Rough Riders who served in the Spanish–American War of 1898). The battalion consisted of 72nd, 76th, 78th and 79th (Rough Rider) Companies, IY, under the command of Lt-Col Richard Colvin, of the Essex Troop, Loyal Suffolk Hussars, with Capt Viscount Maitland (formerly of the Scots Guards) as adjutant. It embarked in April after only one month's training.

The battalion landed in South Africa on 3 May, where the companies were posted to separate formations during the guerrilla war phase of the campaign. For example, at the end of July the 72nd and 79th Companies of 'The Roughs' joined Col Bryan Mahon's force at Pretoria alongside the 20th (Fife and Forfar Light Horse) Company and a composite squadron formed from the depleted 7th Battalion, IY (25th (West Somerset), 26th (Dorset), 27th (Devon), 48th (North Somerset) and 69th (Sussex) Companies) and saw action at Olifant's Nek in August during the pursuit of Christiaan de Wet. 'The Roughs' were popular among their fellow yeomen because of the large quantities of food and comforts they received from family and friends in the city. In September 1900, 72nd Company was serving alongside the composite squadron in a column under Maj-Gen R.A.P. Clements pursuing Koos de la Rey. In October the company was ordered back to Pretoria.

During the campaign, the 20th (Rough Riders) Battalion lost three officers and 27 other ranks killed or died, and 18 seriously wounded, and its members received a number of decorations, including Lt-Col Colvin who was Mentioned in dispatches and awarded a Companionship of the Bath (CB).

The First Contingent of the Imperial Yeomanry completed their year's term of service in 1901; however, enough of the Rough Riders signed on for a second term for two companies (76th and 78th) of the battalion to continue in service. Meanwhile, the 22nd (Rough Riders) Battalion, IY, had been raised in London on 27 March 1901 for the Second Contingent of the IY, consisting of 84th, 85th, 86th and 87th (Rough Riders) Companies. The 2nd Rough Riders sailed from Southampton aboard the German on 31 March under the command of Lt-Col Hugh Houghton Stewart of the 3rd (Fermanagh Militia) Battalion, Royal Inniskilling Fusiliers, with Maj Viscount Dungarvan (lieutenant-colonel of the North Somerset Yeomanry) as his second-in-command. On arrival in South Africa, the battalion was joined by 76th and 78th Companies from the First Contingent. The battalion was disbanded at the end of the war in 1902.

The Imperial Yeomanry concept was considered a success: before the war ended the existing Yeomanry regiments at home were converted into Imperial Yeomanry, and some of the war-raised battalions were established as permanent regiments. The Rough Riders were established on 27 July 1901 as 1st County of London Imperial Yeomanry (Rough Riders) under the command of Viscount Maitland, promoted to lieutenant-colonel, while Lt-Col Colvin was invited to raise and command a separate new regiment of Essex Imperial Yeomanry. In 1902 the Lord Mayor of London and other influential City people successfully petitioned for the unit's name to be changed to City of London Imperial Yeomanry (Rough Riders). Regimental Headquarters (RHQ) was established at the London Guildhall, later transferring to Finsbury Square. (Note: The regiment was based at 39 Finsbury Square, a building which was demolished in the 1920s. The site is now occupied by City Gate House which was designed by Frederick Gould and Giles Gilbert Scott and completed in 1930.) The establishment of a regiment of the IY was four squadrons and a machine gun section, totalling 596 men. The new regiment was granted the Battle honour South Africa 1900–02 in view of the service of its predecessor units.

== Territorial Force ==
Under the Haldane Reforms of 1908, the Imperial Yeomanry was subsumed into the new Territorial Force (TF) and the regiments dropped the 'Imperial' part of their titles.

The regiment formed part of the London Mounted Brigade of the TF. The regiment also provided the personnel for the London Mounted Brigade Signal Section.

== First World War ==
=== Mobilisation ===
On the outbreak of war, on 4 August 1914, the regiment mobilised at Finsbury Square under the command of Lt-Col O.E. Boulton, TD. In accordance with the Territorial and Reserve Forces Act 1907 (7 Edw. 7, c.9), which brought it into being, the TF was intended to be a home defence force for service during wartime and members could not be compelled to serve outside the country. However, the units were invited to volunteer for Imperial Service on 10 August and most did so. TF units were therefore split in August and September 1914 into 1st Line units for overseas service and 2nd Line reserve units composed of recruits under training and those unable or unwilling to serve overseas. In 1915, the 2nd Line were prepared for active service (though not all went overseas) and 3rd Line units were formed to provide trained replacements for the 1st and 2nd Line, while the home service-only men were transferred to provisional brigades for home defence.

=== 1/1st City of London Yeomanry ===
The 1st Line regiment concentrated with the London Mounted Brigade at its war station of Cavalry Barracks, Hounslow. It joined 2nd Mounted Division on 2 September at Streatley, Berkshire, where the brigades dispersed for training and because of lack of water supplies. The division moved to East Anglia in November 1914, with the London Mtd Bde stationed round North Walsham. Early in March 1915 the division was warned to prepare for overseas service.

==== Gallipoli ====
On 11 April 1915, the regiment embarked on the Scotia and departed from Avonmouth Docks for the Mediterranean. It arrived off Cape Helles on 28 April, three days after the Allied landing had begun the Gallipoli Campaign, and it stood by to land, watching the naval bombardment and shrapnel bursting. However, on 1 May it departed again for Egypt, arriving at Alexandria on 6 May, where it rejoined the 2nd Mounted Division. It was posted to the Suez Canal Defences (near Ismaïlia) by the middle of May and its parent brigade was designated 4th (London) Mounted Brigade. The division was dismounted in August 1915 for service at Gallipoli. Each regiment left a squadron headquarters and two troops (about 100 officers and men) in Egypt to look after the horses.

The dismounted regiment embarked at Alexandria aboard the Caledonia on 14 August and sailed for Lemnos where it transshipped to HMS Doris and continued to Suvla Bay where a fresh landing on the Gallipoli peninsula was under way. The regiment landed on the morning of 18 August and went into reserve positions at Karakol Dagh. It moved to 'C' Beach, Lala Baba, on 20 August. On 21 August, it advanced to Chocolate Hill under heavy fire and took part in the attack on the Turkish positions on Hill 112 (the Battle of Scimitar Hill). The Yeomanry brigades advancing in squadron columns 'presented such a target as artillerymen dream of' and suffered heavy casualties as they 'stumbled blindly forward into battle'. The 1/1st CoLY reached Green Hill and occupied the trenches there, finding them 'chock full of dead and dying' from the earlier attack by 86th Brigade. It was ordered to retire during the night and the survivors were back at Lala Baba by 04.30.

Due to the losses at Hill 112 and from battle wastage during August 1915, the 2nd Mounted Division had to be reorganised. On 4 September 1915, the regiments of 4th (London) Mtd Bde combined to form '4th London Regiment' in 2nd Composite Mounted Brigade. The combined regiment rotated between the firing line and the reserve trenches during September and October, but its strength continued to decline from battle casualties and sickness. By mid-October the 2nd Composite Mtd Bde was too weak to carry out its duties. The survivors of 1/1st CoLY embarked in the Ermine for Mudros on 2 November and returned to Egypt in December where it was reformed and remounted. (Note: The dismounted regiment departed Alexandria for Gallipoli on 14 August 1915 with a strength of 17 officers and 315 other ranks. By the time it left Gallipoli (2 November 1915) its strength had fallen to 5 officers and 46 other ranks.)

==== Egypt ====
The composite regiment was immediately engaged with the Western Frontier Force (WFF) in the minor Senussi campaign. The WFF made a surprise night attack on the Senussi force in the 'Affair of the Wadi Majid' on 25 December 1915, when two troops of Rough Riders were in the mounted Left Column that made a wide outflanking move. Although the Senussis broke and ran from the direct attack, communication difficulties meant that the mounted column was too late to cut them off.

The 2nd Mounted Division was broken up early in 1916 and 4th (London) Mtd Bde with 1/1st CoLY left on 18 January 1916 for Abbassia to serve once again in the Canal Defences. In March 1916, the brigade was redesignated as 8th Mounted Brigade. In October, the regiment took part in a raid from the Canal defences upon a Turkish post at Bir el Maghara in the Sinai Desert. The force marched out on the evening of 13 October, and after two night marches it attacked on the morning of 15 October and drove the Turks from their advanced position. After a two-hour engagement, the British commander decided that taking the second position would incur unacceptable losses, and withdrew to the Canal.

==== Salonika ====
In November 1916, the regiment was shipped via Salonika to the Macedonian front where it served with 8th Mtd Bde as GHQ Troops in the British Salonika Army (BSA). During 1917, the BSA made one serious attack (the First Battle of Doiran in April–May), otherwise the Macedonian front was relatively quiet. The Allied commanders had been warned that if they made no progress they would have to release troops to other fronts. The failure of the Doiran attack was followed by the move of several British formations, including 8th Mtd Bde, from the BSA to the Egyptian Expeditionary Force (EEF), which was about to restart its own offensive into Palestine.

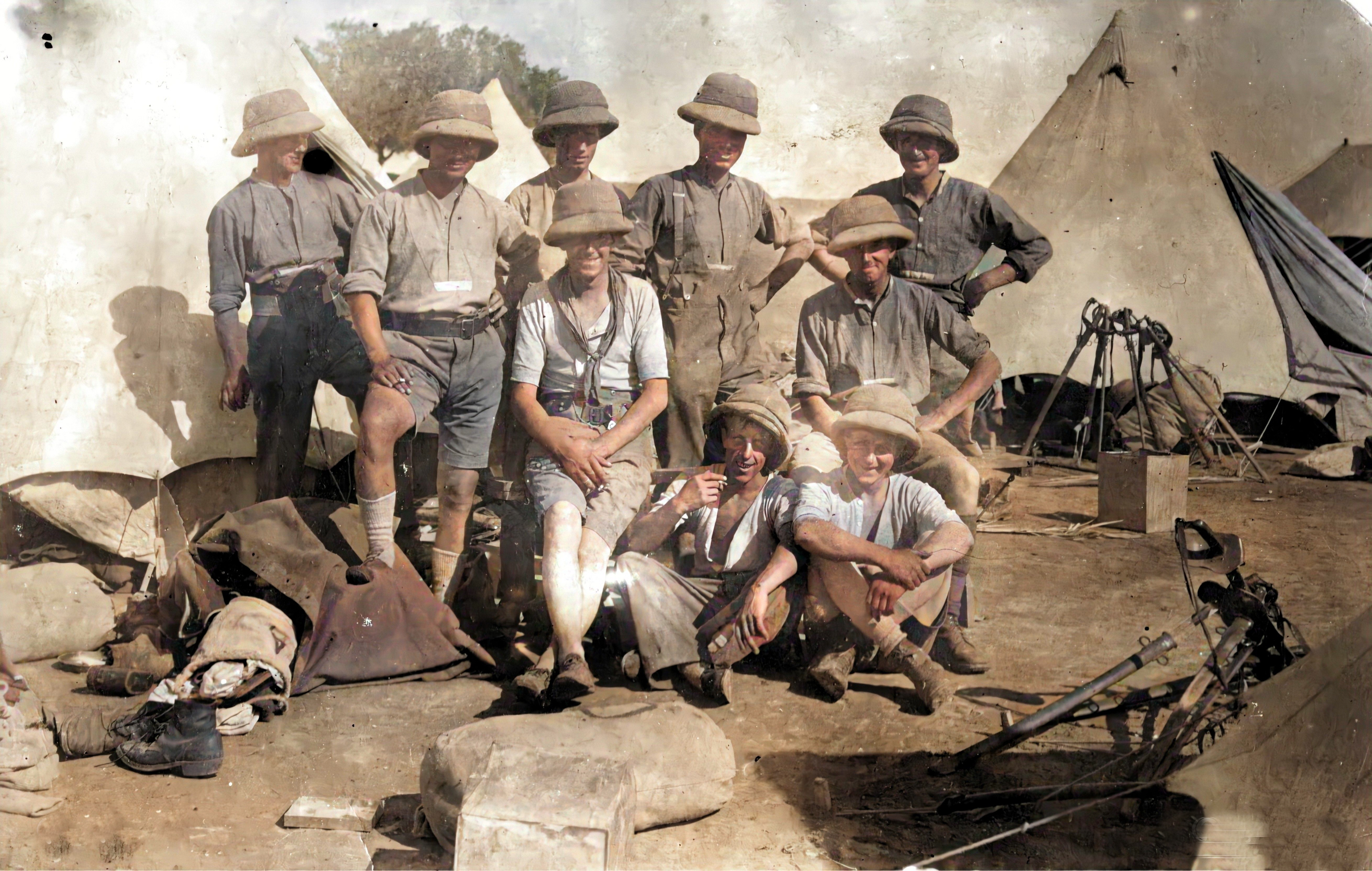
Rough Riders in Egypt

==== Palestine ====
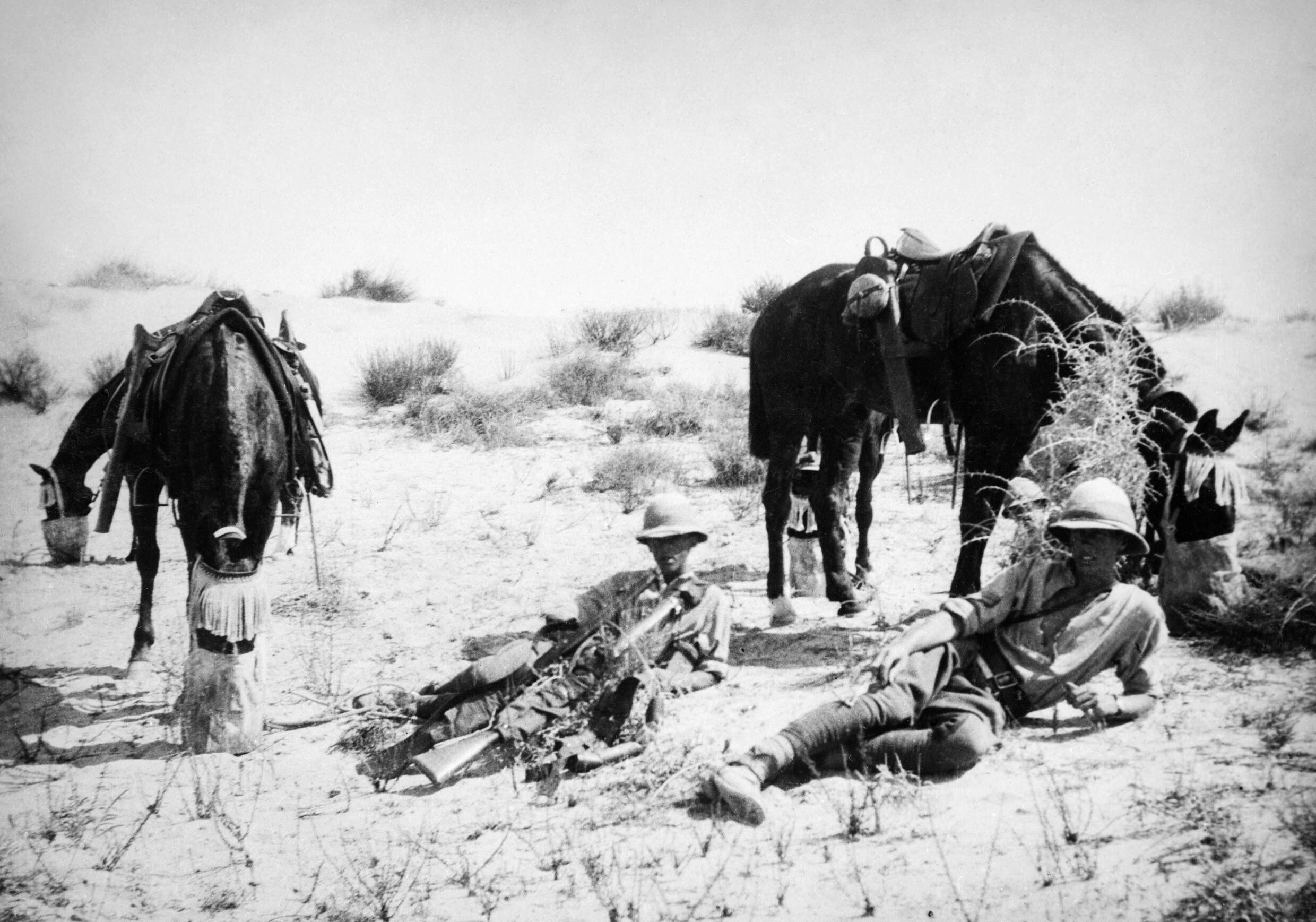
Yeomanry on patrol in the Palestinian desert, 1918.

The Rough Riders arrived back in Egypt from Salonika with 8th Mtd Bde on 8 June 1917. They moved up into Palestine and joined the newly formed Yeomanry Mounted Division on 21 July 1917 at El Fuqari. The EEF was preparing for an attack at Gaza (the Third Battle of Gaza) to be launched on 31 October. On the night of 26 October the 8th Mtd Bde took over a 40 miles (64 km) long outpost line with two regiments, while 1/1st CoLY was in reserve. At 04.10 the following morning the outposts came under heavy attack and a troop of the Middlesex Yeomanry was almost cut off. A squadron of the CoLY under Maj L.P. Stedall rode up in support, reaching a hummock 200 yards (180 m) from the outpost before it was itself pinned down, dismounted, behind this slight cover. However, its presence prevented the Middlesex from being completely surrounded, and the outpost held out all day until infantry arrived to drive off the enemy late in the afternoon. Another Middlesex outpost was less fortunate and was wiped out after seven hours' resistance. Major Stedall was later awarded the Distinguished Service Order (DSO) for leading his men galloping over 500 yards (460 m) of open country under heavy rifle and machine gun fire despite being wounded twice.

The EEF began its advance to contact on 28/29 October, the columns moving mainly by night, and the concentration was complete on 30 October. During the early days of the fighting (the Battle of Beersheba) the Yeomanry Mtd Division remained in reserve holding an observation line until 5 November when it was moved to fill a gap on the flank of the formations attacking the Sheria position. On 7 November, it held the captured positions in the hills north of Beersheba while the rest of the Desert Mounted Corps (DMC) was launched through the Turks' broken centre. On 8 November the fresh Yeomanry were ordered to rejoin the tiring DMC as quickly as possible and take up the pursuit. The division carried out a long march from water point to water point as it moved towards the coast, 8th Mtd Bde arriving at Majdal on the evening of 11 November. Here, the division took up positions to support the Australian Mounted Division against a Turkish counter-attack.

On 13 November, the Yeomanry Mtd Division attacked Yibna, followed through to El Maghar and then occupied Junction Station (the Battle of Mughar Ridge), though 8th Mtd Bde only played a minor part. The advance continued into the Judaean Hills towards Jerusalem, 8th Mtd Bde struggling through the tough terrain and the divisional transport blocking the roads. On 21 November, while the infantry advanced to capture Nebi Samwil, 6th Mtd Bde attempted to capture Beitunye and to assist them the 1/1st CoLY began a dismounted attack up a narrow valley on their right. Then, the 1/1st Royal Buckinghamshire Yeomanry got into difficulties on Zeitun Ridge, and three squadrons of the 1/1st CoLY and 1/3rd County of London Yeomanry (Sharpshooters) were sent up in succession to help. The official historian comments that 'the horses of practically two brigades were now massed below the hill. The Turks strove continually to reach this tempting target, but the sides of the ravine were too steep and deep for their shrapnel to do any harm'. Turkish reinforcements eventually drove the Bucks Yeomanry off the Beitunye, and 8th Mtd Bde covered the withdrawal to Beit Ur al-Fauqa that night

The Battle of Nebi Samwil continued until 24 November. The Yeomanry Mtd Division was in no condition to play much part: 8th Mtd Bde held Beit Ur al-Fauqa, with a squadron of 1/1st CoLY on the western edge of the Zeitun Ridge. The division's wounded, without tents, suffered terribly from the winter weather. On 27 November, the Turks began a counter-attack to defend Jerusalem. The Yeomanry Mtd Division only had about 800 rifles in the line, with a Troop of 1/1st CoLY holding 'City Hill' about 1,000 yards (910 m) (a two-hour climb) in front of Et Tire. It was attacked at 14.00 by about 300 Turks supported by artillery, and was forced to fall back after being heavily shelled and losing its commander. A second troop was sent forward and temporarily reoccupied the hill, but was soon forced to withdraw to 'Signal Hill', half a mile further back. This position was reinforced by two squadrons of the Middlesex Yeomanry, who built stone sangars for defence. Next day, the Turks continued their attacks, the 8th Mtd Bde holding its ground stoutly until its flank was exposed. The troop of 1/1st CoLY at Et Tire was almost surrounded, but managed to withdraw to Beit Duqqu along with the Middlesex from Signal Hill. Although the attacks were continued on 29 November, the Yeomanry began to be relieved by infantry. The Yeomanry Mtd Division was out of the line when Jerusalem was captured on 9 December; indeed, it was unable to move for lack of artillery, ammunition, food and water, and took no further part in the winter fighting.

In early 1918, the EEF was required to send reinforcements to the British Expeditionary Force (BEF) fighting on the Western Front. Many of these units were found by 'Indianising' (Note: British divisions were converted to the British Indian Army establishment whereby brigades only retained one British regiment or battalion and most support units were Indian (artillery excepted).) British formations in the EEF, which released British units for France. In March 1918, the 1st Indian Cavalry Division was broken up in France: while the British units (Note: Notably 6th (Inniskilling) Dragoons, 17th Lancers, 1/1st Queen's Own Yorkshire Dragoons and A, Q and U Batteries RHA)) remained with the BEF, the Indian elements were sent to Egypt. This allowed the EEF to 'Indianise' the Yeomanry Mtd Division when the Indian Army units arrived in theatre. (Note: By an EEF GHQ Order of 12 April 1918, the mounted troops of the EEF were reorganised. On 24 April 1918, the Yeomanry Mounted Division was 'Indianised'and its title changed to 1st Mounted Division (the third distinct division to bear this title – see 1st Mounted Division and 3rd Mounted Division). The 8th Mtd Bde was merged with elements of the 8th (Lucknow) Cavalry Brigade)

==== France ====
The Rough Riders and the Sharpshooters left 8th Mtd Bde on 7 April ahead of its 'Indianisation' (Note: They were replaced by 29th Lancers (Deccan Horse) and 36th Jacob's Horse from 8th (Lucknow) Cavalry Brigade.) and were merged to form E Battalion of the Machine Gun Corps (MGC).

E Battalion, MGC, was posted to France, arriving on 1 June 1918. On 17 August 1918, it was renumbered as 103rd (City & 3rd County of London Yeomanry) Battalion, MGC. The battalion remained on the Western Front for the rest of the war. At the Armistice, it was serving as Army Troops with First Army.

The 103rd Battalion MGC was disbanded in 1919.

=== 2/1st City of London Yeomanry ===
The 2nd Line regiment was formed in London in August 1914. In March 1915, it joined 2/1st London Mounted Brigade in 2/2nd Mounted Division at East Dereham in Norfolk. On 31 March 1916, the remaining Mounted Brigades were ordered to be numbered in a single sequence; the brigade was numbered as 12th (2/1st London) Mtd Bde and the division as 3rd Mounted Division.

In July 1916, the regiment was converted to a cyclist unit in 4th Cyclist Brigade, 1st Cyclist Division (the former 1st Mtd Division) and was stationed at North Walsham. In November 1916, the division was broken up and the regiment was merged with the 2/1st West Somerset Yeomanry to form 5th (West Somerset and City of London) Yeomanry Cyclist Regiment in 2nd Cyclist Brigade at Coltishall. In February 1917, it was replaced in 5th Yeomanry Cyclist Regiment by 2/1st Hampshire Yeomanry, resuming its identity as 2/1st City of London Yeomanry, and moving to 5th Cyclist Brigade in the new 1st Mounted Division (the 3rd Mtd Division renamed) at Littlebourne near Canterbury in Kent. By July 1917, the regiment was at Bridge (also near Canterbury) and on 4 September 1917, the division was renamed as The Cyclist Division. In January 1918, the regiment moved to Wingham and remained there, still in 5th Cyclist Bde, until the end of the war.

=== 3/1st City of London Yeomanry ===
The 3rd Line regiment was formed in 1915 and in the summer it was affiliated to a Reserve Cavalry Regiment in Eastern Command. In the summer of 1916 it joined 6th Reserve Cavalry Regiment in Dublin. Early in 1917 it was absorbed into 1st Reserve Cavalry Regiment (Lancers) at The Curragh.

== Interwar ==
Following the experience of the war, it was decided that only the fourteen most senior yeomanry regiments would be retained as horsed cavalry, with the rest being transferred to other roles. The TF was reformed on 7 February 1920 and on 16 February the CoLY was transferred to the Royal Artillery (RA) and amalgamated with the Honourable Artillery Company (HAC) to form C Battery in 11th (Honourable Artillery Company and City of London Yeomanry) Brigade of the Royal Horse Artillery (RHA). The TF was reconstituted as the Territorial Army in 1921 and C Bty was redesignated 1st Bty on 29 October that year, the HAC batteries retaining their traditional A and B. At first the HQ of 11th RHA was at the old CoLY drill hall at 39 Finsbury Square, but by 1930 brigade HQ and the HAC batteries were at Finsbury Barracks (next to the HAC at Armoury House), with 1st (CoLY) Bty a short distance away at 130 Bunhill Road. In August 1937 1st Bty dropped its number and became simply City of London Battery (The Roughriders).

11th (HAC & CoLY) Brigade formed part of the TA's 2nd Cavalry Division.

By the mid-1930s the army's requirement for light anti-aircraft (LAA) defence was being addressed, and the first TA LAA units were formed in 1938. Initially, they were armed with Light machine guns (AALMGs), but the new Bofors 40 mm gun was on order. The senior TA LAA unit was formed at Bunhill Row on 29 September 1938 by splitting the CoLY Battery from 11th HAC and expanding it to full strength as 11th (City of London Yeomanry) (Rough Riders) LAA Brigade, RA, with 31, 32 and 33 LAA Btys. On 1 January 1939, it was redesignated as a regiment rather than a brigade, in line with the RA's modernisation of its terminology, and an additional 43 LAA Bty was formed within the regiment on 17 January.

== Second World War ==
=== Mobilisation ===
The TA's AA units were mobilised on 23 September 1938 during the Munich Crisis, with units manning their emergency positions within 24 hours, even though many did not yet have their full complement of men or equipment. The emergency lasted three weeks, and they were stood down on 13 October. In February 1939, the existing AA defences came under the control of a new Anti-Aircraft Command. In June, as the international situation worsened, a partial mobilisation of the TA was begun in a process known as 'couverture', whereby each AA unit did a month's tour of duty in rotation to man selected AA sites. On 24 August, ahead of the declaration of war, Anti-Aircraft Command was fully mobilised at its war stations, with LAA units distributed to defend Vulnerable Points (VPs) such as factories and airfields.

11th (CoLY) LAA Regiment mobilised under the command of Lt-Col M.B.P. Stedall and immediately moved to its war stations at a variety of VPs across Middlesex, Essex and Kent, including Bentley Priory, RAF Fighter Command's HQ in Stanmore, Enfield Power Station, Tilbury Docks, the Thames Haven and Coryton oil refineries, Sheerness Dockyard and Canewdon radar station. The regiment formed part of a new 56th Light Anti-Aircraft Brigade that was forming in 6th Anti-Aircraft Division, which was responsible for defending South East England.

=== Phoney War ===
Before the end of the day on 24 August, regimental headquarters (RHQ) had been established at the King's Head Hotel at Stanford-le-Hope in Essex, where embodiment of TA soldiers and recruits and the attached women of the Auxiliary Territorial Service (ATS) continued. General mobilisation was announced on 1 September and war was declared on 3 September. RHQ moved to the Collegiate School at Stanford-le-Hope on 10 September, and the regiment formally came under command of 56th LAA Brigade on 30 September. On 10 October, the 1st Bedford Company, ATS, was attached to the regiment. There had been a number of false air raid alarms soon after the declaration of war, but from late November occasional Luftwaffe reconnaissance aircraft began passing over Stanford-le-Hope too high for the LAA to engage them.

At this stage of the war, AA Command was very short of equipment, particularly for its LAA units, and a variety of old and makeshift guns were in use. On 9 October, 43 LAA Bty, which had been manning Lewis guns as AALMGs at Tilbury Docks, handed them over to 285 Bty of 90th Heavy AA Rgt and took over the defences at Enfield Power Station from a detachment of 32 LAA Bty; this VP was equipped with three 3-inch naval guns and one Bofors gun, as well as a number of Lewis guns. In January 1940, naval 2-pounder multiple pom-pom guns were withdrawn from Canvey Island and Thameshaven for conversion to Mk VIII state and were replaced by Lewis guns until 3-inch guns arrived a month later.

In February, 43 LAA Bty left (see below) and the regiment also had to take over additional commitments at Tilbury from 56th (East Lancashire) LAA Rgt, which was leaving to join the British Expeditionary Force (BEF) in France. In addition, 56th LAA Bde had to strip some Bofors guns from its VPs in order to equip 55th (Devon) LAA Rgt before it joined the BEF, while the Royal Navy was demanding the return of some of its 2-pounders.

=== 43 (City of London Yeomanry) LAA Battery ===
While the rest of the regiment remained in AA Command during the Phoney War period, 43 (CoLY) LAA Bty, then at Chingford and Great Bromley, left on 15 February, and along with 44 LAA Bty from 12th (Finsbury Rifles) LAA Rgt it joined 60th (Royal Welch Fusiliers) Anti-Tank Rgt to form 101st LAA/AT Rgt. This composite unit, the first of its kind, was part of 1st Support Group (1st Sp Gp) in 1st Armoured Division, which was rushed to France to join the BEF after the German invasion of the Low Countries. Armed only with Lewis guns, its Bofors not having arrived, 43 (CoLY) LAA Bty fought in the Battle of Abbeville as 1st Armoured Division attempted to break through to the surrounded BEF. The division was evacuated from western France two weeks after the rest of the BEF had been evacuated from Dunkirk.

While it refitted in the UK, 101st LAA/AT Rgt was broken up on 1 November to form 76th (Royal Welch Fusiliers) A/T Rgt and a separate 61st LAA Rgt (including 43 (CoLY) Bty) in 1st Sp Gp. In the autumn of 1941, 1st Armoured Division sailed for Egypt. It was committed to Eighth Army's Operation Crusader piecemeal before it had time to prepare for desert warfare, where LAA detachments were attached to mobile Jock columns for 'snap' actions against aircraft and ground targets. After Crusader, Eighth Army took up defensive positions in the Gazala Line, a series of fortified 'boxes' defended by a brigade group, usually including an LAA battery deployed in separate Troop positions.

When Rommel attacked on 27 May 1942 (the Battle of Gazala), D Trp of 43 (CoLY) LAA Bty under Lt Beachman distinguished itself in the defence of 1st Free French Brigade's box at Bir Hakeim in the extreme south of the line, which held out until ordered to withdraw on 10 June.

After the Battle of Gazala, Eighth Army retreated to a fall-back position at El Alamein. Here 61st LAA Rgt and its batteries came under the command of 7th Armoured Division. However, the regiment had been withdrawn from the front line by the time the Second Battle of El Alamein was fought in October 1942. From January 1943, 43 (CoLY) LAA Bty was defending the army's bases in Egypt, which increasingly became a back area. 61st LAA Rgt was broken up in the Middle East on 1 August 1944 to provide infantry reinforcements for Eighth Army in Italy.

=== Battle of Britain ===
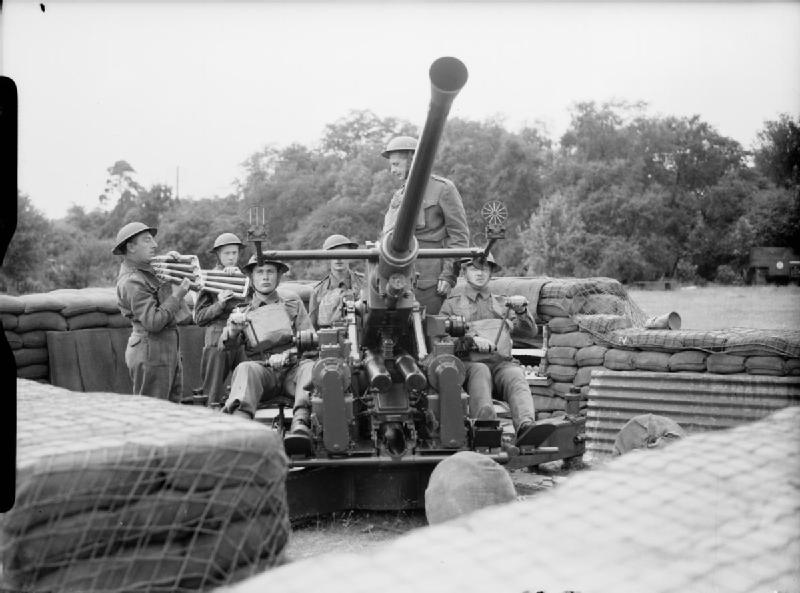
Bofors gun at Stanmore June 1940.

On 1 May 1940, shortly before the Phoney War ended with the German invasion of Holland, 31 LAA Bty with its towed Bofors guns was sent to Gillingham, Kent, and assigned to 'N' Mobile AA Bde operating south of the Thames under the commander of 49 AA Bde, while another CoLY Troop was assigned as a mobile reserve north of the river equipped with Lewis guns. These reserves were envisaged as having an anti-parachutist role in addition to AA defence. 'N' Mobile Bde was transferred to HQ 2 AA Bde after it returned from Dunkirk, and was broken up at the end of June.

In late May, both RHQ at Stanford-le-Hope and 32 Bty HQ (BHQ) at Leigh-on-Sea moved to Weald Hall, at South Weald near Brentwood, Essex, where the regiment established a camp. The rest of the regiment, its batteries, and even individual troops were split up and widely dispersed across southern England, mainly to defend airfields of Fighter Command: on 20 May 33 LAA Bty was ordered to move its Bofors detachments from Canewdon to RAF Hornchurch and RAF Martlesham Heath; in June, 31 LAA Bty received additional Bofors, bringing it up to its establishment of 12 guns, but the three troops were scattered between Gravesend Airport in Kent, RAF Kenley in Surrey and RAF Tangmere in Sussex; in July, 32 LAA Bty sent a Troop to defend the Hawker Aircraft factory at Langley Airfield in Buckinghamshire.

However, there was a pause between the Dunkirk evacuation and the beginning of serious German air operations against Southern England, and during June and July several of the regiment's detachments were able to carry out gunnery training at Cark Practice Camp, before returning to Weald Park Camp and being assigned to airfields. On 29 July, the regiment received its first draft of 238 Militiamen for training, but the medical officers considered only 43 of them to be of A1 medical category.

RAF Kenley was attacked on 3 July by a single Luftwaffe bomber flying too high for the regiment's Bofors to reply. However, these airfields were under constant attack once the Battle of Britain really got under way in August. Left Troop of 31 LAA Bty was in action on 16 August when Tangmere was attacked by Junkers Ju 87 Stukas; on 18 August another troop of the battery at Kenley shot down one bomber and claimed a second. On 23 August, the battery handed over Tangmere, Kenley and Gravesend to 152 LAA Bty of 51st (Devon) LAA Rgt (re-equipped after Dunkirk) and concentrated at Weald Park as AA Command shuffled its resources to meet the threats. Hornchurch was badly bombed on 24 August, but the defending troop of 33 LAA Bty was unable to fire because the bombers were too high. On 26 August, the troop at RAF Rochford fired on a German bomber that was already force-landing after being attacked by a Spitfire fighter. Rochford was bombed from high level two days later, narrowly missing some of the gun emplacements. There were also numerous night attacks over the area, to which the LAA guns could not reply. 32 LAA Battery took over defence of RAF North Weald on 10 September and three days later 31 LAA Bty deployed its troops to RAF Debden, RAF Coltishall and RAF Wittering (Left Trp). On 24 September, the troop of 32 LAA Bty at Langley was redeployed to various sites around Woolwich.

=== Blitz ===
By now, the daylight Battle of Britain had been won, and the Luftwaffe switched to night bombing of London and other cities (The Blitz), so the role of 56 LAA Bde's guns at the VPs was reduced. On 5 October, 32 LAA Bty sent a detachment to man two Bofors guns guarding Windsor Castle, and the rest of the battery was redeployed during the month to Hawker's aircraft factories at Langley and Kingston-upon-Thames and briefly to ordnance factories at Woolwich and Plumstead, with BHQ at Staines. A second draft of 230 militiamen had been posted to the regiment in late September, but at the end of October it was ordered to adopt the official War Establishment, which meant that it could post out around 314 unwanted other ranks to 49th LAA Rgt. The following month 31 LAA Bty was redeployed with AALMGs to RAF Benson (two trps) and Walters Ash (one trp defending RAF Bomber Command HQ); 33 LAA Bty with Bofors to Stanmore (two trps defending RAF Fighter Command HQ) and Weybridge (one trp defending the Vickers aircraft factory at Brooklands). With the regiment's gunsites now all west of London, an advanced RHQ was established at Staines on 1 December, and the regiment was now part of 49 AA Bde in 1st AA Division defending London, with which it remained until after the end of the Blitz in May 1941.

AA Command continued to expand and Maj John Anderson Armstrong, commanding 33 LAA Bty, was promoted from the regiment to command a new 73 LAA Rgt formed on 27 February 1941. The new unit's RHQ began assembling at 32 LAA Bty's BHQ at Sunningdale before moving to Stanwell, Middlesex, on 14 March. As the new batteries arrived from the training regiments, they took over several of 11th (CoLY) LAA Rgt's VPs including Langley, (8 x Bofors) and Surbiton, Surrey (12 x Lewis). 49 AA Bde began training courses for the new regiment, with instructors provided by 11th (CoLY) LAA Rgt, and Sir Charles Shuckburgh, Bt, was later transferred from the regiment as adjutant of 73rd LAA Rgt.

In January 1941, 11th (CoLY) LAA Rgt was warned of a new mobile role in Combined Operations, and Left Troop of 31 LAA Bty moved from Wittering to the Combined Operations Training Centre at Inverary in Scotland. The regiment adopted the organisation for a mobile unit in March. The batteries and troops continued to be shuffled around VPs in the Home counties and RHQ moved from South Weald and Staines to Bracknell, Berkshire. On 1 May, 33 LAA Bty was ordered to mobilise, leaving the regiment and joining the War Office Reserve.

To replace 33 LAA Bty, the regiment was joined in June by a new 283 Bty formed within 16th LAA Rgt. It quickly embraced the CoLY identity, even though it left again in September 1941. Later, it was converted into 1 (City of London Yeomanry) Airlanding LAA Battery (see below). 11th (CoLY) LAA Regiment (less 283 Bty, joining 73rd LAA Rgt) received its mobilisation orders on 21 August 1941 and proceeded to the mobilisation centre at Leeds, then to 'A' Camp at Pollok, near Glasgow, where 33 LAA Bty rejoined and the regiment began intensive training. It moved to Ayr Racecourse in November.

=== Tunisia ===
A year later, the regiment was still in the UK, finally about to embark for North Africa (Operation Torch) as part of First Army with the following organisation:

- RHQ 11th LAA Rgt
- 31, 32, 33 LAA Btys
- 11 LAA Rgt Signal Section, Royal Corps of Signals (RCS)
- 11 LAA Workshop Section, Royal Electrical and Mechanical Engineers (REME)
- 11 LAA Rgt Platoon, Royal Army Service Corps (RASC)

The Torch landings began on 8 November and the build-up of forces continued over succeeding weeks as V Corps pushed eastwards towards Tunis. It was halted short of the city by Axis forces, and there was a pause while the build-up continued. By mid-January, the 11th CoLY LAA Rgt had arrived and moved up to defend V Corps' assets in the forward area, where German and Italian divebombing and 'tank-busting' attacks were frequent. However, the concentration of British LAA guns drove the enemy aircraft to bomb from higher altitude. AA ammunition expenditure was high, and supply was erratic over the poor roads of Tunisia. V Corps and the air forces continued their build-up, and by mid-March one of 11th (CoLY) LAA Rgt's batteries had been detached under 22 AA Bde as part of the defences for Souk-el-Khemis Airfield where the first Spitfires had been deployed and begun to win air superiority. First Army renewed its offensive at the end of March with massive air support and by the time of the Fall of Tunis in May 1943, the whole regiment was assigned to airfield protection under 22 AA Bde.

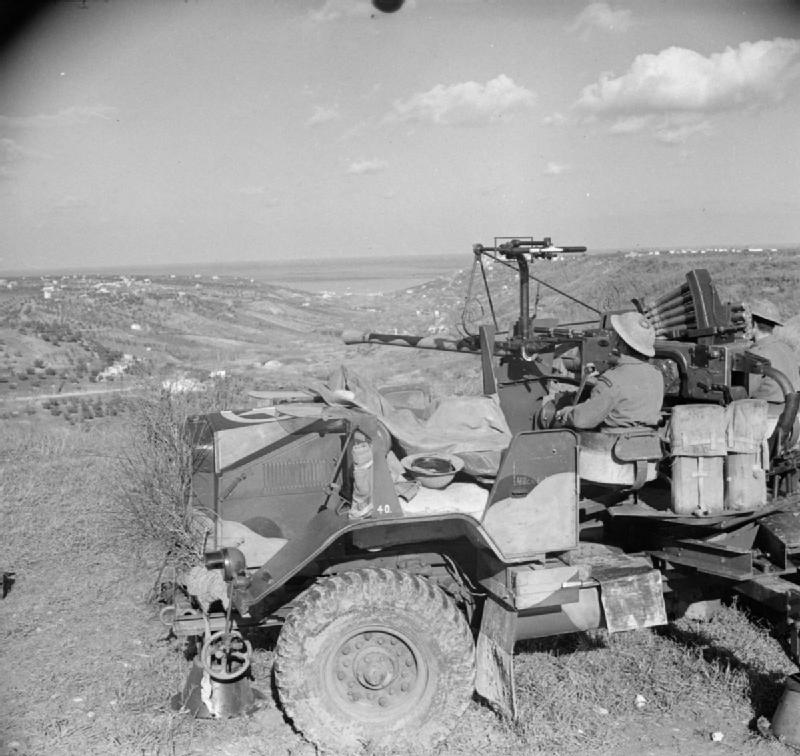
Self-propelled (SP) Bofors gun of 11th (CoLY) LAA Rgt in Italy, 16 January 1944.

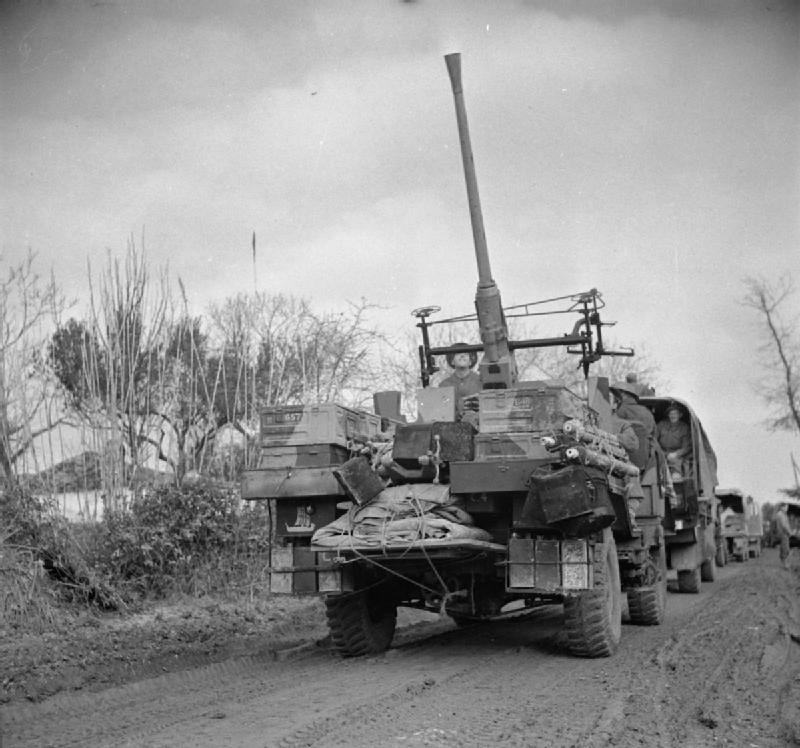
11th (CoLY) LAA Rgt convoy in Italy, 16 January 1944.

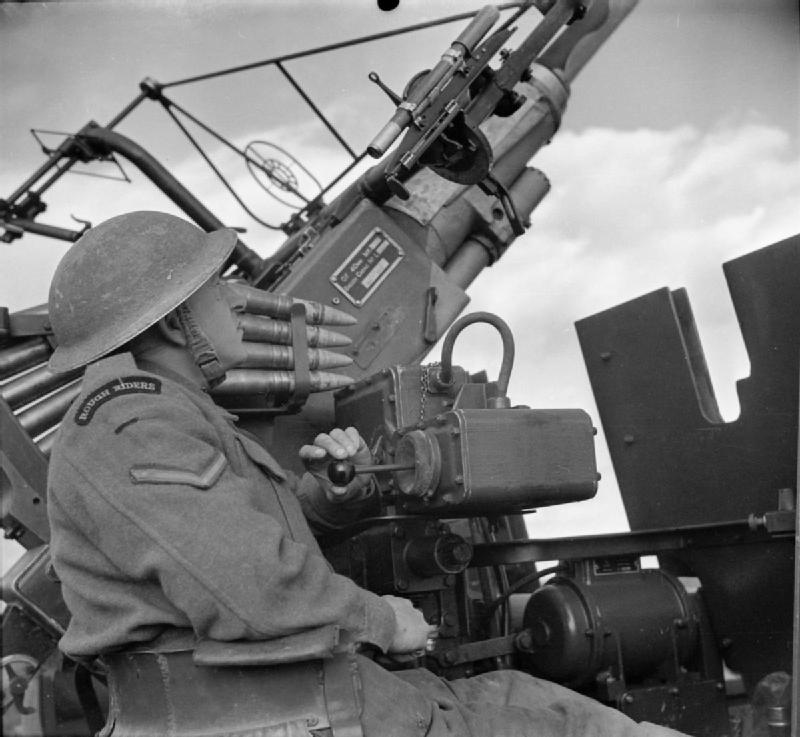
Lance Bombardier Ian Hopkins, one of the crew of an SP Bofors of 11th (CoLY) LAA Rgt in Italy, 16 January 1944: note his 'Rough Riders' shoulder title.

=== Italy ===
11th (CoLY) LAA Regiment was not involved in the Allied landings in Sicily (Operation Husky) or mainland Italy (Operation Baytown), but joined 2 AA Bde as the Italian Campaign developed. By July 1944, the brigade had reached Ancona on the Adriatic coast with V Corps, mainly deployed to protect airfields and field gun areas.

After a short period of refitting and re-training at Anzio in August, 2 AA Bde's units returned to the line between Arezzo and Florence in September, a 270 miles (430 km) journey across mountains that was unusually carried out as a single road convoy. Between September and December, as the Allied armies closed up to the Gothic Line, its units were widely distributed, some supporting XIII Corps with Fifth US Army, others with X Corps and II Polish Corps under Eighth Army; 11th (CoLY) LAA Rgt was mainly defending landing grounds. In late 1944, the Luftwaffe was suffering from such shortages of pilots, aircraft and fuel that serious air attacks were rare. At the same time the British Army was suffering a severe manpower shortage. The result was that a number of AA units were deemed surplus and were disbanded to provide reinforcements to other arms of service. 11th (CoLY) LAA Regiment remained in service, but now retrained as infantry for defence duties. Some of its Bofors batteries re-equipped with 3-inch or 4.2-inch mortars and heavy machine guns for infantry support, as 2 AA Bde held a section of the line as an independent formation. From November to January, 11 (CoLY) LAA Rgt supported 1st Division with one battery deployed in AA defence of bridges, the rest in a variety of roles, including Provost duties, ammunition transport, and assisting the Royal Engineers and Pioneers in bridging and smoke making. In February 1945 the regiment was reduced from nine to six troops (54 to 36 guns).

When Eighth Army's spring offensive opened in March 1945, 2 AA Bde had been expanded with medium and mountain artillery under its command to form 'Macforce' (named after Brigadier Murray McIntyre of 2 AA Bde). Initially, Macforce operated under 6th Army Group Royal Artillery (6 AGRA), then began to operate as an AGRA in its own right. In April, Macforce drove down Route 9 in pursuit of the retreating Axis forces, supporting the Friuli and Folgore Combat Groups of the Italian Co-belligerent Army. One of its battle groups under the command of 85th Mountain Rgt, RA, supporting 10th Indian Infantry Division, included 57th (Home Counties) Field Rgt and 11th (CoLY) LAA Rgt with five troops of 3-inch and 4.2-inch mortars; only one troop retained Bofors guns to defend the gun areas.

2 AA Brigade's last AA action was on 20 April 1945. It then went into reserve until hostilities ended on 2 May with the Surrender of Caserta. After the end of the campaign, 2 AA Bde including 11th (CoLY) LAA Rgt was reorganised as a motor transport group based at Forlì and Faenza. At the conclusion of hostilities, 11th (CoLY) LAA Rgt was commanded by Lt-Col H.S.O.P. Stedall, brother of the regiment's commander on the outbreak of war, and for long his second-in-command.

=== 1 (City of London Yeomanry) Airlanding LAA Battery ===
283 LAA Battery was formed on 9 June 1941 at Gillingham, Kent, from the fourth troops of 45 46 and 83 LAA Btys of 16th LAA Rgt, with the BHQ supplied by 11th (CoLY) LA Rgt. It joined the latter and embraced the CoLY identity, even though it left and joined 17th LAA Rgt on 12 September 1941. This regiment was serving in the West of Scotland with 63 AA Bde in 12th AA Division. The battery transferred to 1st Airborne Division on 2 July 1942, being converted into 1st (City of London Yeomanry) Air Landing LAA Bty on 4 December.

1st Airborne Division's HQ and divisional troops left the UK on 13 April 1943 and went by sea to North Africa, where they arrived on 26 April at the end of the Tunisian Campaign (though one of its brigades had been engaged for some months). Its brigades were dropped to seize river crossings during the Allied invasion of Sicily (Operation Husky). However, none of 1st (CoLY) A/L LAA Bty seem to have flown in with the gliders of 1st Airlanding Bde in the disastrous attempt to seize the Ponte Grande (Operation Ladbroke) on 10 July. 1st Airborne Division was withdrawn from Sicily back to North Africa by 16 July.

After the landings on the Italian mainland began on 3 September, 1st Airborne Division was sent to make a subsidiary seaborne landing from warships at Taranto (Operation Slapstick) on 9 September. The division quickly took over the port and airfield at Taranto and brought in its heavier equipment as the leading echelons set off in pursuit of the retreating German 1st Parachute Division. Shortly afterwards the division took the Adriatic ports of Bari and Brindisi and the important Foggia Airfield Complex. It then settled to defend Foggia, where a large AA defence organisation was built up, initially by 2 AA Bde, which arrived by 30 September.

1st Airborne Division embarked from Italy on 22 November and on 10 December arrived back in the UK, where after refitting it spent the first part of 1944 training for the Allied invasion of Normandy (Operation Overlord). However, 1st (CoLY) A/L LAA Bty left the division on 21 February 1944 and reverted to its former title of 283 LAA Bty for the rest of the war. It was placed in suspended animation on 4 February 1946.

== Postwar ==
=== 35 LAA Regiment ===
When the TA was reconstituted on 1 January 1947, the personnel then serving in the regiment were transferred to a new war-formed 11th LAA Rgt with 31–33 Btys. On 1 April 1947 this was redesignated 35 LAA Regiment in the Regular Army with the following organisation:

- 31 LAA Bty – disbanded to resuscitate 13 Bty unlinked from 9/13 Medium Bty in 4th Medium Rgt as 90 LAA Bty
- 32 LAA Bty – disbanded to resuscitate 15 Bty unlinked from 15/17 Medium Bty in 5th Medium Rgt as 92 LAA Bty
- 33 LAA Bty – disbanded to resuscitate 7 Bty from 4/7 Medium Bty in 2nd Medium Rgt as 99 LAA Bty

35 LAA Regiment was equipped with the more powerful L/70 model Bofors gun and formed part of 8 AA Bde in AA Command's 5 AA Group. It was converted into 35 LAA/Searchlight Rgt on 16 March 1949, and by 1950 was serving in British Army of the Rhine (BAOR), stationed at Crerar Barracks, Oldenburg, and by June 1955 at St Barbara Barracks in Adelheide. The regiment was converted back to LAA on 1 November 1955. It was disbanded on 1 October 1958 and its batteries placed in permanent suspended animation.

=== City of London Yeomanry (Rough Riders), RAC ===
The City of London Yeomanry (Rough Riders) was reformed on 1 January 1947 as an armoured regiment of the Royal Armoured Corps (RAC), with three squadrons, affiliated to the Regular Army's Queen's Bays (2nd Dragoon Guards). The regiment served in 22 Armoured Bde in 56th (London) Armoured Division.

56th (London) Division was converted back into an infantry formation in 1956, and the City of London Yeomanry (Rough Riders) became an infantry battalion of the Rifle Brigade on 1 October 1956 without changing its title.

When the TA was reduced on 1 May 1961, the Rough Riders were amalgamated with the Inns of Court Regiment, given their geographical proximity, to form the Inns of Court & City Yeomanry. Following the 1967 defence cuts, the TA was reorganised as the Territorial and Army Volunteer Reserve (TAVR) and the unit converted to form 68 (Inns of Court & City Yeomanry) Signal Squadron, within 71 (Yeomanry) Signal Regiment, Royal Corps of Signals. In 2009, 68 Signals Squadron amalgamated with 36 (Essex Yeomanry) Signal Squadron to form 68 (Inns of Court & City and Essex Yeomanry) Signal Squadron and, following the Strategic Defence and Security Review, 68 Signal Squadron reverted to the name of 68 (Inns of Court & City Yeomanry) Signal Squadron in 2015.

== Uniforms and insignia ==
The Imperial Yeomanry's service dress was Khaki with a Slouch hat, officially replaced by a Service cap in 1906. The Rough Riders adopted a review order uniform comprising a blue-grey ('French grey') tunic or 'frock' with patch pockets and purple facings. The blue slouch hat had a purple band and a bunch of light blue feathers on the left side. When the peaked service cap was introduced it was also blue with a purple band. Greatcoats were French grey with purple collars (and were still in use after mobilisation in 1914), and the service breeches also carried purple stripes. The cap badge was the Coat of arms of the City of London in a laurel wreath surmounted by a crown. The collar badge was a spur carrying the initials 'R.R.' When it joined the TF in 1908, the regiment adopted a Lancer style full dress and walking-out uniform in French grey, with the plastron front and overall stripes in purple. Officers (and all ranks from the Coronation of 1911) wore a lance cap (Chapka) in French grey with a light blue plume, the plate carrying the City of London arms with its dragon supporters.

On its formation, 11th (CoLY) LAA Rgt adopted as its cap badge the old Rough Riders' collar badge with the letters RR in brass on a white metal spur. In place of the usual RA shoulder title on the battledress blouse, the regiment used a purple title with the words ROUGH RIDERS embroidered in white (see photo above). Lieutenant-Colonel M.B.P. Stedall's CoLY battledress uniform ca 1943 is in the collection of the National Army Museum, London.

After the Second World War, the regiment was granted as a special distinction on its guidon the gun badge of the Royal Artillery inscribed '1942–45' upon two scrolls inscribed 'North Africa' and 'Italy' (see below).

== Honorary colonels ==
The following served as Honorary Colonel of the regiment:

- Lt-Col Viscount Maitland (later 14th Earl of Lauderdale), former commanding officer, appointed Hon Col on 23 July 1908, and continued in the role with 11th (HAC & CoLY) Bde, RHA.
- Brevet Col the 5th Earl of Limerick, DSO, TD, former commanding officer of CoLY Bty, RHA, appointed 23 March 1932, continued with 11th (CoLY) LAA Rgt, RA, and CoLY, RAC, until 1952.
- Col Sir James Waterlow, 2nd Baronet, commissioned 1938, commanded CoLY, RAC, 1945–50, appointed 1952.
- HM Queen Elizabeth the Queen Mother, appointed 4 July 1952.

=== Other prominent members ===
- Cosmo Gordon Lang, Bishop of Stepney, later Archbishop of Canterbury, appointed Chaplain of the regiment on 7 May 1907.
- William Sinclair, Archdeacon of London, appointed Chaplain of the regiment on 31 December 1910.
- Several members of the Pemberton Stedall family, owners of the London ironmongers Stedall & Co, served in the CoLY, including Capt Cecil Pemberton Stedall, commissioned into the regiment in 1914, his brother Maj Leigh Pemberton Stedall, DSO, who led the squadron at Gaza, and their nephews Lt-Col Marcus Bertram Pemberton Stedall, OBE, TD, who commanded 11th (CoLY) LAA Rgt from 24 April 1938 through the first part of the Second World War, and his brother and second-in-command Maj Henry Sydney Oliver Pemberton Stedall, OBE, who was later promoted to Lt-Col and commanded the regiment himself.
- Second lieutenants commissioned into the new 11th (CoLY) LAA Rgt in 1938 included: the Hon Seymour Berry, later 2nd Viscount Camrose, and his brother the Hon Michael Berry, later Baron Hartwell, of the family of newspaper proprietors; the cricketers G.O.B. 'Gubby' Allen and Sir Charles Shuckburgh, 12th Baronet; Sir James Waterlow, 2nd Baronet, company director; the Hon Claud Phillimore, later 4th Lord Phillimore, architect; and Robert Grosvenor, later 5th Duke of Westminster
- Capt Philip, 9th Earl of Hardwicke was posted to the regiment on 29 June 1940.
- Patrick Buchan-Hepburn, MP, later Baron Hailes of Prestonkirk, was posted to 32 LAA Bty on 16 October 1940 and served in the regiment until 1943.

== Memorials ==
A white marble tablet flanked by two grieving female figures, inscribed with the names of the 30 men of 20th (Rough Riders) Battalion, IY, who died in South Africa 1900–02, is in the Abbey Church of Holy Cross & St Lawrence, Waltham Abbey. The First World War memorial to the regiment is in St Bartholomew-the-Great Church, Smithfield, with 96 names; two side panels were added with eight names from the Second World War. The regiment is also listed on the London Troops War Memorial in front of the Royal Exchange.

== Battle honours ==
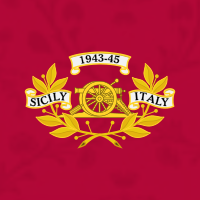
Honorary Distinction awarded to the Shropshire Yeomanry for service as a Royal Artillery regiment. The Rough Riders Honorary Distinction would be similar.

The City of London Yeomanry was awarded the following battle honours:

Second Boer War

South Africa 1900–02

First World War

Pursuit to Mons, France and Flanders 1918, Macedonia 1916–17, Suvla, Scimitar Hill, Gallipoli 1915, Rumani, Egypt 1915–16, Gaza, El Mughar, Nebi Samwil, Palestine 1917–18

Second World War

The Royal Artillery does not carry battle honours; (Note: The Royal Artillery was present in nearly all battles and would have earned most of the honours awarded to cavalry and infantry regiments. In 1833, William IV awarded the motto Ubique (meaning "everywhere") in place of all battle honours.) instead units that were temporarily converted to the RA were awarded an honorary distinction to be borne upon their colours or guidons (see above).

== See also ==
- Imperial Yeomanry
- List of Yeomanry Regiments 1908
- Yeomanry
- Yeomanry order of precedence
- British yeomanry during the First World War
- Second line yeomanry regiments of the British Army
- List of British Army Yeomanry Regiments converted to Royal Artillery
- County of London Yeomanry

== Bibliography ==
- L.S. Amery (ed), The Times History of the War in South Africa 1899-1902, London: Sampson Low, Marston, 6 Vols 1900–09.
- Army Council Instructions Issued During April 1916, London: HM Stationery Office, 1916.
- Army Council Instructions Issued During February 1917, London: HM Stationery Office, 1917.
- Brig C.F. Aspinall-Oglander, History of the Great War: Military Operations Gallipoli, Vol II, May 1915 to the Evacuation, London: Heinemann, 1932/Imperial War Museum & Battery Press, 1992, ISBN 0-89839-175-X/Uckfield: Naval & Military Press, 2011, ISBN 978-1-84574-948-4.
- Barnes, R. Money (1963). The Soldiers of London. London: Seeley Service.
- Maj A.F. Becke,History of the Great War: Order of Battle of Divisions, Part 2a: The Territorial Force Mounted Divisions and the 1st-Line Territorial Force Divisions (42–56), London: HM Stationery Office, 1935/Uckfield: Naval & Military Press, 2007, ISBN 1-847347-39-8.
- Burke's Peerage, Baronetage and Knightage, 100th Edn, London, 1953.
- Sir O'Moore Creagh and E.M. Humphris, The VC and DSO, Vol III, The DSO from January 1916, London: Standard Art Books.
- Basil Collier, History of the Second World War, United Kingdom Military Series: The Defence of the United Kingdom, London: HM Stationery Office, 1957/Uckfield: Naval & Military, 2004, ISBN 978-1-84574-055-9.
- Col John K. Dunlop, The Development of the British Army 1899–1914, London: Methuen, 1938.
- Maj L.F. Ellis, History of the Second World War, United Kingdom Military Series: The War in France and Flanders 1939–1940, London: HM Stationery Office, 1954/Uckfield: Naval & Military, 2004, 978-1-85457-056-6.
- Capt Cyril Falls, History of the Great War: Military Operations, Egypt and Palestine, Vol II, From June 1917 to the End of the War, Part I, London: HM Stationery Office, 1930/Uckfield: Naval & Military Press, 2013, ISBN 978-1-84574-951-4.
- Capt Cyril Falls, History of the Great War: Military Operations, Egypt and Palestine, Vol II, From June 1917 to the End of the War, Part II, London: HM Stationery Office, 1930/Uckfield: Naval & Military Press, 2013, ISBN 978-1-84574-950-7.
- Gen Sir Martin Farndale, History of the Royal Regiment of Artillery: The Years of Defeat: Europe and North Africa, 1939–1941, Woolwich: Royal Artillery Institution, 1988/London: Brasseys, 1996, ISBN 1-85753-080-2.
- Col S.P. Foakes & Maj M. McKenzie-Bell (eds), Essex Yeomanry: A Short History, Essex: Temperley Media/Essex Yeomanry Association, nd, ISBN 978-0-9572333-0-0.
- Frederick, J. B. M. (1984a). Lineage Book of British Land Forces 1660–1978. Vol. I. Wakefield: Microform Academic. ISBN 1-85117-007-3.
- Frederick, J. B. M. (1984b). Lineage Book of British Land Forces 1660–1978. Vol. II. Wakefield: Microform Academic. ISBN 1-85117-009-X.
- Brig E.A. James, British Regiments 1914–18, London: Samson Books, 1978, ISBN 0-906304-03-2/Uckfield: Naval & Military Press, 2001, ISBN 978-1-84342-197-9.
- Litchfield, Norman E. H. (1992). The Territorial Artillery 1908–1988 (Their Lineage, Uniforms and Badges). Nottingham: Sherwood Press. ISBN 0-9508205-2-0.
- Lt-Gen Sir George MacMunn & Capt Cyril Falls, History of the Great War: Military Operations, Egypt and Palestine, Vol I, From the Outbreak of War with Germany to June 1917, London: HM Stationery Office, 1928/Imperial War Museum and Battery Press, 1992, ISBN 1-870423-26-7/Uckfield: Naval & Military Press, 2011, ISBN 978-1-84574-952-1.
- Mileham, Patrick (1994). The Yeomanry Regiments; 200 Years of Tradition. Edinburgh: Canongate Academic. ISBN 1-898410-36-4.
- Brig C.J.C. Molony,History of the Second World War, United Kingdom Military Series: The Mediterranean and Middle East, Vol V: The Campaign in Sicily 1943 and the Campaign in Italy 3rd September 1943 to 31st March 1944, London: HM Stationery Office, 1973/Uckfield, Naval & Military Press, 2004, ISBN 1-845740-69-6.
- John North, Gallipoli: The Fading Vision, London: Faber & Faber, 1936.
- Perry, F. W. (1993). Order of Battle of Divisions Part 5B. Indian Army Divisions. Newport: Ray Westlake Military Books. ISBN 1-871167-23-X.
- Maj-Gen I.S.O. Playfair, History of the Second World War, United Kingdom Military Series: The Mediterranean and Middle East, Vol III: (September 1941 to September 1942) British Fortunes reach their Lowest Ebb, London: HM Stationery Office, 1960 /Uckfield, Naval & Military Press, 2004, ISBN 1-845740-67-X
- Rinaldi, Richard A. (2008). Order of Battle of the British Army 1914. Ravi Rikhye. ISBN 978-0-9776072-8-0.
- Col H.C.B. Rogers, The Mounted Troops of the British Army 1066–1945, London: Seeley Service, 1959.
- P.T. Ross, A Yeoman's Letters, 3rd Edn, London: Simpkin, Marshall, Hamilton, Kent, 1901.
- Routledge, N. W. (1994). History of the Royal Regiment of Artillery: Anti-Aircraft Artillery 1914–55. London: Royal Artillery Institution/Brassey's. ISBN 1-85753-099-3.
- Ryan, Ernest (June 1960). "The Post-South African War Yeomanry". Journal of the Society for Army Historical Research. 38: 57–62. JSTOR 44223318.
- Edward M. Spiers, The Army and Society 1815–1914, London: Longmans, 1980, ISBN 0-582-48565-7.
- Titles and Designations of Formations and Units of the Territorial Army, London: War Office, 7 November 1927.
- Alan Wakefield and Simon Moody, Under the Devil's Eye: Britain's Forgotten Army at Salonika 1915–1918, Stroud: Sutton, 2004, ISBN 0-7509-3537-5.
- Westlake, Ray (1996). British Regiments at Gallipoli. Barnsley: Leo Cooper. ISBN 0-85052-511-X.
- Order of Battle of the British Armies in France, November 11th, 1918. France: General Staff, GHQ. 1918.

=== External links ===
- Anglo Boer War
- BAOR Locations
- Mark Conrad, The British Army 1914
- British Army units from 1945 on
- Grace's Guide to British Industrial History
- London Gazette
- The Long, Long Trail
- Orders of Battle at Patriot Files
- Land Forces of Britain, the Empire and Commonwealth – Regiments.org (archive site)
- Roll of Honour
- The Royal Artillery 1939–45
- Stepping Forward: A Tribute to the Volunteer Military Reservists and Supporting Auxiliaries of Greater London
- Graham Watson, The Territorial Army 1947
- "The City of London Yeomanry (Rough Riders)". Orders of Battle.com.
- Official British Army site - 71st Signals Regiment
- British Military History
- Rough Riders at Inns of Court & City Yeomanry website
