= Goland Clarke =

British Army general (1875–1944)

Brigadier-General Goland Clarke CMG DSO
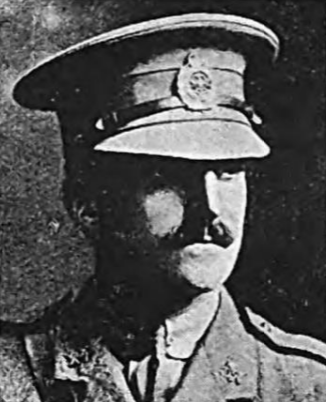
- Major Clarke of the City of London Yeomanry, attached to the 14th Cavalry. c.1915
- Born: 25 November 1875; Denstone, Staffordshire
- Died: 27 August 1944 (aged 68); Steyning, Sussex
- Military career
- Allegiance: United Kingdom
- Branch: British Army
- Rank: Brigadier-General
- Commands: City of London Yeomanry (Rough Riders); 7th Mounted Brigade; 14th Cavalry Brigade
- Conflicts: Second Boer War; First World War: Gallipoli campaign; Sinai and Palestine campaign
- Other work: Big game hunter Naturalist

Brigadier-General Goland Vanhalt Clarke, CMG, DSO (25 November 1875 – 27 August 1944) was a cavalry officer in the British Army, a big game hunter, naturalist and collector.

== Early life ==
Clarke was born 25 November 1875 at Heywood Hall, Denstone, Staffordshire. He was educated at Winchester College and the Royal Military College, Sandhurst. After graduation he initially joined the 4th (Royal Irish) Dragoon Guards in March 1896, but on 13 January 1897 he transferred to the 18th (Princess of Wales's) Hussars as a second-lieutenant.

== Second Boer War (1899–1902) ==
Clarke transferred to the 18th (Princess of Wales's) Hussars as a second lieutenant in January 1897. He deployed with the regiment to South Africa in 1899 and saw continuous service until the end of the war in 1902.

=== Early Operations (1899) ===
Clarke took part in the regiment's initial movements in Natal. On 24 October 1899, during reconnaissance supporting the withdrawal from Dundee, a patrol from "C" Squadron under his command became separated from the main body. The small group scouted high ground for artillery positions, sent messages back, encountered a Boer ambulance (from which Clarke learned details of the Talana fighting), and endured a heavy storm before rejoining friendly lines near Ladysmith. They achieved this after safely passing the Elandslaagte battlefield this action took place as part of the broader effort to cover the withdrawal of General James Yule's Dundee force following the Battle of Talana.

=== Siege of Ladysmith (1899–1900) ===
During the four-month siege, Clarke served through difficult conditions marked by disease and shelling. By early February 1900, with many officers and men suffering from enteric fever, he was part of a reduced detachment (including Lieuts. Wood and Cawston) left in the old Klip River camp under Major Laming. The main body of the regiment moved, dismounted, to Manchester Fort on Caesar's Camp, where they held roughly 1,000 yards of front with sangars and supported the defense during the major Boer assault on 6 January 1900. Clarke was promoted to lieutenant on 24 February 1900 while the siege was still ongoing.

=== Advance into the Transvaal (1900) ===
After the relief of Ladysmith in February 1900, Clarke participated in the regiment's northward advance. In May–June he was among the officers (alongside Capt. Burnett as acting adjutant and others) involved in marches from Ladysmith, crossing the Biggarsberg, and operating with General Neville Lyttelton's force. Duties included advanced guard work, river crossings (such as the Buffalo River), and engagements with Boer rearguards as British forces pushed into the Transvaal. These operations formed part of the larger British advance that eventually led to the occupation of Pretoria and the shift to guerilla warfare.

=== Later Operations and Distinguished Service Order (1901–1902) ===
In the guerilla phase of the war, Clarke served in mobile column operations across the eastern Transvaal, including patrols, convoy escorts, and night marches. He was awarded the Distinguished Service Order for good service in General Bruce Hamilton's operations in the Ermelo District in December 1901, a period of aggressive sweeps that captured significant numbers of Boers, livestock, and supplies. The 18th Hussars returned to England in 1902 aboard the SS Custodian, landing at Southampton in August.

== Between wars ==
After the Boer War Clarke was promoted to captain on 28 September 1904. The same year as he became a member of the British Ornithologists' Union, their obituary on Clarke claimed he was "an exceptionally good field naturalist, and his knowledge of the breeding habits of European birds was extensive. He made collections in various parts of Europe and in Africa, and his name is commemorated by a species of Weaver named after him, Heterhyphankes golandi, the type of which is still unique". Clarke still a captain resigned his regular commission on 2 November 1907, but later joined the City of London Yeomanry (Rough Riders), part of the reserve Territorial Force, and was promoted to major on 4 July 1912.

== First World War (1914–1918) ==
At the start of the First World War, Clarke was the commanding officer of the Rough Riders, which was part of the London Mounted Brigade. The brigade with the rest of the 2nd Mounted Division were sent to fight the Ottoman Empire in the Gallipoli campaign. Notably during the battles for Sari Bair and Scimitar Hill.

When the British forces were withdrawn from Gallipoli, Clarke served in the Sinai and Palestine campaign. He was promoted to brigadier-general and given commend of the 7th Mounted Brigade, later the 14th Cavalry Brigade.

=== Battle of Mount Hamrin ===
In March 1917, during the Mesopotamian campaign, Brigadier-General Clarke commanded the 9th Brigade. As part of the wider offensive following the capture of Baghdad, British forces engaged the Ottoman Sixth Army at Mount Hamrin on 25 March 1917.

Clarke's 9th Brigade, which included the 1/1st Gorkhas, 2nd Dorsets, and 105th Marathas, was ordered to attack Ottoman positions on the mountain's lower spurs. The initial British battle plan relied on the 9th Brigade flanking the Ottoman forces to the east, while the 8th Brigade assaulted the center. However, the element of surprise was lost when the Ottoman forces detected British bridge-building efforts and shifted reinforcements to their eastern flank.

While initial aerial reconnaissance indicated the lower spurs were lightly held, later intelligence detected the movement of these Ottoman reinforcements; however, the order to attack proceeded regardless. The 9th Brigade did not flank far enough east and directly engaged the reinforced trenches, which formed an amphitheater-shaped defensive position. The brigade advanced roughly four miles but faced accurate fire and sustained significant casualties. This included the loss of the commanding officers of the 105th Marathas. Unable to break the Ottoman lines without reinforcements, the 9th Brigade was ordered to withdraw after four hours of combat. They executed a retirement while the 8th Brigade launched an assault on the center of the Ottoman trenches to assist the withdrawal.

== Later life ==
Clarke died at Maudlyn House, Stenying, Sussex, on 27 August 1944, aged 68.

A memorial plaque exists to the north of the choir inside the church. The plaque bears the Latin motto Praemium virtutis honor ("Honor is the reward of virtue)" alongside a record of some of his notable First World War commands.

== Bibliography ==
- Hamilton, A. S. (1936). The City of London Yeomanry (Roughriders). Hamilton Press.
- Jobling, James A. (2010). Helm Dictionary of Scientific Bird Names. A and C Black. ISBN 978-1408125014.
- Moberly, F. J. (1925). The Campaign in Mesopotamia 1914–1918. Vol. 3. London: His Majesty's Stationery Office.
- Abhyankar, M. G. (1971). Valour Enshrined: A History of the Maratha Light Infantry, 1768–1947. Orient Longman.
