= 3rd Mounted Brigade =

3rd Mounted Brigade may refer to:

- 3rd (Nottinghamshire and Derbyshire) Mounted Brigade, designation given to the Nottinghamshire and Derbyshire Mounted Brigade while serving with the 2nd Mounted Division in the Gallipoli Campaign
- 3rd Mounted Brigade (United Kingdom), also known as 2/1st North Midland Mounted Brigade
- 3rd Mounted Brigade (Canada)
