= Allitsen Road drill hall =

Former drill hall in London

- St John's Wood, London
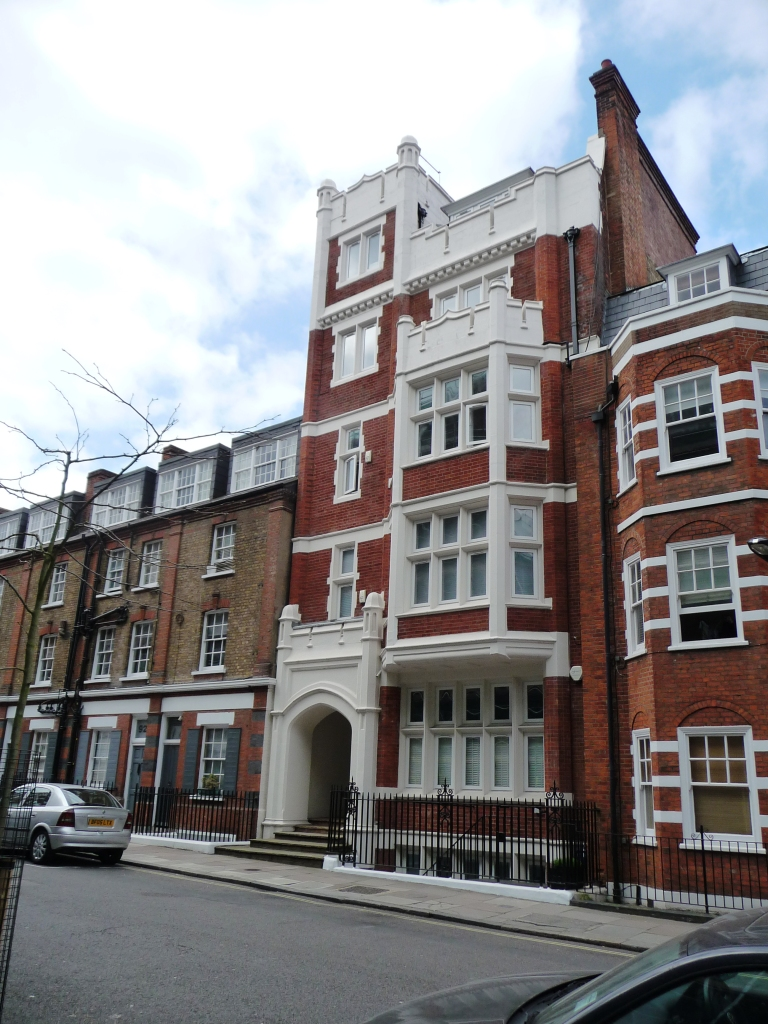
- Allitsen Road drill hall

Site information
- Type: Drill Hall

Location
- Location within London
- Coordinates: 51.53408°N 0.16901°W

Site history
- Built: 1912
- Built for: War Office
- In use: 1912-Present

The Allitsen Road drill hall is a former drill hall in St John's Wood, London.

== History ==
The building was designed as the headquarters of the 3rd County of London Yeomanry (Sharpshooters) in what was then known as Henry Street (now Allitsen Road) in St John's Wood and was completed in 1912. The regiment was mobilised at the drill hall in August 1914 before being deployed to Gallipoli.

The unit evolved to become the 5th (London) Armoured Car Company, Tank Corps in 1920 and the 23rd (London) Armoured Car Company, Royal Tank Corps in 1922 but reverted to being known as the 3rd County of London Yeomanry (Sharpshooters) in 1939. The regiment amalgamated with the 4th County of London Yeomanry to become the 3rd/4th County of London Yeomanry (Sharpshooters) in August 1944 during the Second World War. The regiment was re-formed at the Allitsen Road drill hall in 1947 but after the regiment amalgamated with 297 (Kent Yeomanry) Regiment, Royal Artillery to form the Kent and Sharpshooters Yeomanry in 1961, the drill hall was decommissioned and converted into offices.
