= 14th Cavalry Brigade (British Indian Army) =

Nottinghamshire and Derbyshire Mounted Brigade 3rd (Nottinghamshire and Derbyshire) Mounted Brigade 7th Mounted Brigade 14th Cavalry Brigade
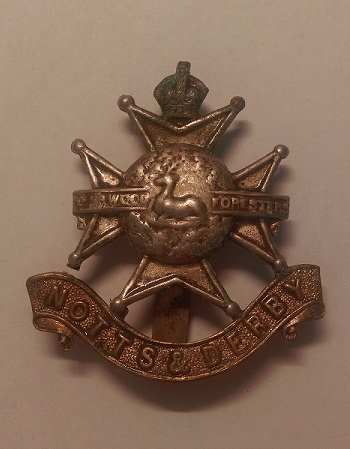
- Nottinghamshire and Derbyshire Mounted Brigade Cap Badge
- Active: 1908 – September 1919
- Country: United Kingdom
- Allegiance: King of the United Kingdom
- Branch: British Army; British Indian Army
- Type: Yeomanry & cavalry
- Size: Brigade
- Part of: 2nd Mounted Division; 5th Cavalry Division
- HQ (peacetime): Nottingham
- Engagements: First World War; Gallipoli 1915; Salonika 1916–17; Egypt and Palestine 1917–18

Commanders
- Notable commanders: Goland Vanhalt Clarke

The Nottinghamshire and Derbyshire Mounted Brigade (later numbered as the 7th Mounted Brigade) was a yeomanry brigade of the British Army, formed as part of the Territorial Force in 1908.

It served dismounted in the Gallipoli Campaign before being remounted to serve in the Salonika and Sinai and Palestine Campaigns in the First World War.

In April 1918, it was merged with elements of the 9th (Secunderabad) Cavalry Brigade to form 14th Cavalry Brigade. It remained in Palestine after the end of the war on occupation duties.

== Formation ==
Under the terms of the Territorial and Reserve Forces Act 1907 (7 Edw.7, c.9), the brigade was formed in 1908 as part of the Territorial Force. It consisted of three yeomanry regiments, a horse artillery battery and ammunition column, a transport and supply column and a field ambulance.

As the name suggests, the units were drawn from Nottinghamshire and Derbyshire.

== First World War ==
=== Nottinghamshire and Derbyshire Mounted Brigade ===
The brigade was embodied on 4 August 1914 upon the outbreak of the First World War. Initially, it concentrated in Berkshire, and on 5 August 1914, the brigade joined the 1st Mounted Division. On 2 September, it was transferred to the 2nd Mounted Division, and in mid November 1914, it moved with its division to Norfolk on coastal defence duties.

==== Egypt ====
In April 1915, the 2nd Mounted Division moved to Egypt arriving at Alexandria between 19 and 21 April and was posted to Cairo by the middle of May. In May 1915, the brigade was designated 3rd (Nottinghamshire and Derbyshire) Mounted Brigade.

It was dismounted in August 1915 and took part in the Gallipoli Campaign. Each regiment left a squadron headquarters and two troops (about 100 officers and men) in Egypt to look after the horses.

==== Gallipoli ====
The brigade landed at Suvla Bay on the night of 17/18 August and moved into reserve positions at Lala Baba on the night of 20 August. On 21 August, it advanced to Chocolate Hill under heavy fire and took part on the right flank of the attack on Hill 112.

Due to losses during the Battle of Scimitar Hill and wastage during August 1915, the 2nd Mounted Division had to be reorganized. On 4 September 1915, the 2nd Composite Mounted Brigade was formed from the 3rd (Notts and Derby) and 4th (London) Mounted Brigades. The brigade formed a battalion sized unit 3rd Nottinghamshire and Derbyshire Regiment. The brigade embarked for Mudros on 2 November and returned to Egypt in December 1915 where it was reformed and remounted.

=== 7th Mounted Brigade ===
7th Mounted Brigade
Organisation, January 1916

- Sherwood Rangers Yeomanry
- South Nottinghamshire Hussars
- Derbyshire Yeomanry
- Notts and Derby Mounted Brigade Signal Troop
- Notts and Derby Mounted Brigade Field Ambulance, RAMC
- Notts and Derby Mounted Brigade Veterinary Section

The brigade left the 2nd Mounted Division on 18 and 19 January 1916. In February 1916, the brigade was sent to take part in the Salonika Campaign. On 31 March 1916, the remaining Mounted Brigades were numbered in a single sequence. As a consequence, the Nottinghamshire and Derbyshire Mounted Brigade was redesignated as 7th Mounted Brigade.

The brigade arrived back in Egypt from Salonika on 29 June 1917, less the Derbyshire Yeomanry which remained in Macedonia as GHQ Troops with the British Salonika Army. 20th Machine Gun Squadron then was formed on 4 July 1917 at Ismailia from the machine gun sections of the two regiments. The brigade served variously as Corps Troops with the Desert Mounted Corps and XXI Corps and on attachment to the Yeomanry Mounted Division. Essex Battery, RHA joined from 52nd (Lowland) Division on 17 September 1917 and was still assigned to the brigade when it joined the new 2nd Mounted Division.

=== 14th Cavalry Brigade ===
14th Cavalry Brigade
Organisation, September 1918

- Sherwood Rangers Yeomanry
- 20th Deccan Horse
- 34th Prince Albert Victor's Own Poona Horse
- 20th Machine Gun Squadron
- 14th Cavalry Brigade Signal Troop
- 14th Combined Cavalry Field Ambulance, RAMC
- 14th Mobile Veterinary Section

In March 1918, the 2nd Indian Cavalry Division was broken up in France. The Canadian (Canadian Cavalry Brigade) and British units (notably 7th Dragoon Guards, 8th Hussars and N and X Batteries RHA) remained in France and the Indian elements were sent to Egypt.

By an Egyptian Expeditionary Force GHQ Order of 12 April 1918, the mounted troops of the EEF were reorganized when the Indian Army units arrived in theatre. On 24 April 1918, the 2nd Mounted Division (Note: Not to be confused with the original 2nd Mounted Division that fought dismounted at Gallipoli.) was formed on the Indian Establishment, (Note: British Indian Army standard whereby brigades only retained one British regiment or battalion and most support units were Indian (artillery excepted).) and the 7th Mounted Brigade was assigned to it.

On 24 April 1918, the 7th Mounted Brigade was merged with elements of the 9th (Secunderabad) Cavalry Brigade:

- the Sherwood Rangers Yeomanry remained with the brigade
- the South Nottinghamshire Hussars left the brigade and was merged with the Warwickshire Yeomanry (of 5th Mounted Brigade) to form B Battalion, Machine Gun Corps. It was posted to France, arriving in June
- 20th Deccan Horse joined from 9th (Secunderabad) Cavalry Brigade
- 34th Prince Albert Victor's Own Poona Horse joined from 9th (Secunderabad) Cavalry Brigade
- 20th Machine Gun Squadron remained with the brigade
- 7th Mounted Brigade Signal Troop remained with the brigade
- in April, 7th Mounted Brigade Field Ambulance merged with Secunderabad Cavalry Field Ambulance to form 7th Combined Cavalry Field Ambulance
- in April, 7th Mounted Brigade Mobile Veterinary Section merged with Secunderabad Mobile Veterinary Section to form 7th Cavalry Mobile Veterinary Section

On 22 July 1918, the 2nd Mounted Division was renumbered as the 5th Cavalry Division and the brigade as 14th Cavalry Brigade. The sub units (Signal Troop, Combined Cavalry Field Ambulance and Mobile Veterinary Section) were renumbered on the same date.

The brigade remained with 5th Cavalry Division for the rest of the war, taking part in the Affair of Abu Tellul, Battle of Megiddo, Capture of Damascus, and Occupation of Aleppo.

After the Armistice of Mudros, the brigade remained with 5th Cavalry Division in Palestine as part of the occupation forces. However, demobilization began immediately and the brigade was broken up in September 1919.

== Commanders ==
The Nottinghamshire and Derbyshire Mounted Brigade / 7th Mounted Brigade / 14th Cavalry Brigade had the following commanders:

From	Rank	Name
1 April 1912	Colonel	P.A. Kenna, VC, DSO
5 August 1914	Brigadier-general	P.A. Kenna, VC, DSO
20 August 1915	Colonel	E.H. Cole (acting, wounded 21 August)
21 August 1915	Major	F. Fitz H. Lance (acting)
24 August 1915	Brigadier-general	P.A. Kenna, VC, DSO (wounded 28 August, died of wounds 30 August)
29 August 1915	Major	F. Fitz H. Lance (acting)
1 September 1915	Brigadier-general	F. Fitz H. Lance (until 4 September 1915) (Note: Brigade was absorbed in 2nd Composite Mounted Brigade 4 September to 1 December 1915.)
1 December 1915	Brigadier-general	F. Fitz H. Lance
July 1917	Brigadier-general	J.T. Wigan, CMG, DSO
6 December 1917	Brigadier-general	G.V. Clarke, DSO

== See also ==
- 2/1st Nottinghamshire and Derbyshire Mounted Brigade for the 2nd Line formation
- British yeomanry during the First World War

== Bibliography ==
- Becke, Archibald F. (1936). Order of Battle of Divisions Part 2A. The Territorial Force Mounted Divisions and the 1st-Line Territorial Force Divisions (42–56). London: HMSO. OCLC 4405016.
- Davies, Frank; Maddocks, Graham (1995). Bloody Red Tabs. Leo Cooper. ISBN 0-85052-463-6.
- James, Brigadier E.A. (1978). British Regiments 1914–18. London: Samson Books Limited. ISBN 0-906304-03-2.
- Perry, F.W. (1993). Order of Battle of Divisions Part 5B. Indian Army Divisions. Newport: Ray Westlake Military Books. ISBN 1-871167-23-X.
- Rinaldi, Richard A (2008). Order of Battle of the British Army 1914. Ravi Rikhye. ISBN 978-0-97760728-0.
- Unknown (1920). Through Palestine with the 20th Machine Gun Squadron. London: J.M. Baxter & Co. (Printed and Published for private circulation).
- Westlake, Ray (1992). British Territorial Units 1914–18. Osprey Publishing. ISBN 978-1-85532-168-7.
- Westlake, Ray (1996). British Regiments at Gallipoli. Barnsley: Leo Cooper. ISBN 0-85052-511-X.
