= 11th Cavalry Brigade (British Indian Army) =

London Mounted Brigade 4th (London) Mounted Brigade 8th Mounted Brigade 11th Cavalry Brigade
- Active: 1908–1921
- Country: United Kingdom
- Allegiance: British Crown
- Branch: British Army; British Indian Army
- Type: Yeomanry, Cavalry
- Size: Brigade
- Part of: 2nd Mounted Division; Yeomanry Mounted Division; 4th Cavalry Division
- HQ (peacetime): Duke of York's Headquarters, Chelsea
- Engagements: First World War Gallipoli 1915 Salonika 1916–17 Egypt and Palestine 1917–18

The London Mounted Brigade (later numbered as the 8th Mounted Brigade) was a yeomanry brigade of the British Army, formed as part of the Territorial Force in 1908.

It served dismounted in the Gallipoli Campaign before being remounted to serve in the Salonika and Sinai and Palestine Campaigns in the First World War.

In April 1918, it was merged with elements of the 8th (Lucknow) Cavalry Brigade to form 11th Cavalry Brigade. It remained in Palestine after the end of the war on occupation duties.

== Formation ==
Under the terms of the Territorial and Reserve Forces Act 1907 (7 Edw.7, c.9), the brigade was formed in 1908 as part of the Territorial Force. It consisted of three yeomanry regiments, a horse artillery battery and ammunition column (provided by the Honourable Artillery Company), a transport and supply column and a field ambulance. The 2nd County of London Yeomanry was attached for training in peacetime.

As the name suggests, the units were drawn from London.

== First World War ==
=== London Mounted Brigade ===
The brigade was mobilised on 4 August 1914 at the outbreak of the First World War and concentrated in Berkshire. It joined 2nd Mounted Division on 2 September and moved with the division to East Anglia in November 1914.

==== Egypt ====
In April 1915, the 2nd Mounted Division moved to Egypt arriving at Alexandria on 27 April (City of London Yeomanry did not arrive until 6 May) and was posted to the Suez Canal Defences (near Ismaïlia) by the middle of May. In May 1915, the brigade was designated 4th (London) Mounted Brigade.

It was dismounted in August 1915 and took part in the Gallipoli Campaign. Each regiment left a squadron headquarters and two troops (about 100 officers and men) in Egypt to look after the horses.

==== Gallipoli ====
The brigade landed at Suvla Bay on the morning of 18 August and moved into reserve positions at Karakol Dagh. It moved to "C" Beach, Lala Baba on 20 August. On 21 August it advanced to Chocolate Hill under heavy fire and took part in the attack on Hill 112.

Due to losses during the Battle of Scimitar Hill and wastage during August 1915, the 2nd Mounted Division had to be reorganised. On 4 September 1915, the 2nd Composite Mounted Brigade was formed from the 3rd (Notts and Derby) and 4th (London) Mounted Brigades. The brigade formed a battalion sized unit 4th London Regiment. The brigade embarked for Mudros on 2 November and returned to Egypt in December 1915 where it was reformed and remounted.

=== 8th Mounted Brigade ===
8th Mounted Brigade
Organisation, July 1917

- 1st County of London Yeomanry
- City of London Yeomanry (Rough Riders)
- 3rd County of London Yeomanry (Sharpshooters)
- 21st Machine Gun Squadron
- 8th Mounted Brigade Signal Troop
- 1/London Cavalry Field Ambulance, RAMC
- 3/1st Highland Mobile Veterinary Section

The brigade left the 2nd Mounted Division on 18 January 1916 and was sent to Abbassia. It served as part of the Suez Canal Defences. On 31 March 1916, the remaining Mounted Brigades were numbered in a single sequence. As a consequence, the London Mounted Brigade was redesignated as 8th Mounted Brigade.

From November 1916 to June 1917, the brigade took part in the Salonika Campaign, serving as GHQ Troops with the British Salonika Army.

The brigade arrived back in Egypt from Salonika on 8 June 1917. The Machine Gun Squadron was formed in Egypt on 14 June. The brigade moved forward and joined the newly formed Yeomanry Mounted Division on 21 July 1917 at el Fuqari. From 31 October it took part in the Third Battle of Gaza, including the Battle of Beersheba and the Capture of the Sheria Position. It took part in the Battle of Mughar Ridge on 13 and 14 November and the Battle of Nebi Samwil for 17 to 24 November. From 27 to 29 November, it withstood the Turkish counter-attacks during the Capture of Jerusalem.

=== 11th Cavalry Brigade ===
11th Cavalry Brigade
Organisation, September 1918

- 1st County of London Yeomanry
- 29th Lancers (Deccan Horse)
- 36th Jacob's Horse
- 21st Machine Gun Squadron
- 11th Cavalry Brigade Signal Troop
- 11th Combined Cavalry Field Ambulance, RAMC
- 11th Mobile Veterinary Section

In March 1918, the 1st Indian Cavalry Division was broken up in France. The British units (notably 6th (Inniskilling) Dragoons, 17th Lancers, 1/1st Queen's Own Yorkshire Dragoons and A, Q and U Batteries RHA) remained in France and the Indian elements were sent to Egypt.

By an Egyptian Expeditionary Force GHQ Order of 12 April 1918, the mounted troops of the EEF were reorganised when the Indian Army units arrived in theatre. On 24 April 1918, the Yeomanry Mounted Division was indianized (Note: British divisions were converted to the British Indian Army standard whereby brigades only retained one British regiment or battalion and most support units were Indian (artillery excepted).) and its title was changed to 1st Mounted Division, the third distinct division to bear this title. (Note: See 1st Mounted Division and 3rd Mounted Division.)

On 24 April 1918, the 8th Mounted Brigade was merged with elements of the 8th (Lucknow) Cavalry Brigade:

- the 1st County of London Yeomanry remained with the brigade
- the City of London Yeomanry (Rough Riders) and the 3rd County of London Yeomanry (Sharpshooters) left the brigade on 7 April and were merged to form E Battalion, Machine Gun Corps. It was posted to France, arriving on 1 June
- 29th Lancers (Deccan Horse) joined from 8th (Lucknow) Cavalry Brigade
- 36th Jacob's Horse joined from 8th (Lucknow) Cavalry Brigade
- 21st Machine Gun Squadron remained with the brigade
- 8th Mounted Brigade Signal Troop remained with the brigade
- on 30 April, 1/London Cavalry Field Ambulance merged with Lucknow Cavalry Field Ambulance to form 8th Combined Cavalry Field Ambulance
- in April, 3/1st Highland Mobile Veterinary Section merged with Lucknow Mobile Veterinary Section to form 8th Mobile Veterinary Section

On 22 July 1918, the 1st Mounted Division was renumbered as the 4th Cavalry Division and the brigade as 11th Cavalry Brigade. The sub units (Signal Troop, Combined Cavalry Field Ambulance and Mobile Veterinary Section) were renumbered on the same date.

The brigade remained with 4th Cavalry Division for the rest of the war, taking part in the Battle of Megiddo and the Capture of Damascus.

After the Armistice of Mudros, the brigade remained with 4th Cavalry Division in Palestine as part of the occupation forces. However, demobilization began immediately and by May 1919 most of the British units had been repatriated. The division was finally broken up in 1921.

== Commanders ==
The London Mounted Brigade / 8th Mounted Brigade / 11th Cavalry Brigade had the following commanders:

From	Rank	Name
25 May 1914	Colonel	A.H.M. Taylor (until 4 September 1915) (Note: Brigade was absorbed in 2nd Composite Mounted Brigade 4 September to 1 December 1915; Brigadier-General Taylor took command of 2nd Composite.)
5 August 1914	Brigadier-General	A.H.M. Taylor (until 4 September 1915)
1 December 1915	Brigadier-General	A.H.M. Taylor
6 September 1917	Brigadier-General	C.S. Rome, DSO
13 June 1918	Brigadier-General	C.L. Gregory, CB

== See also ==
- 2/1st London Mounted Brigade for the 2nd Line formation
- 11th Indian Cavalry Brigade existed at the same time but was unrelated other than having the same number
- British yeomanry during the First World War

== Bibliography ==
- Becke, Archibald F. (1936). Order of Battle of Divisions Part 2A. The Territorial Force Mounted Divisions and the 1st-Line Territorial Force Divisions (42–56). London: HMSO. OCLC 4405016.
- Becke, Archibald F. (1937). Order of Battle of Divisions Part 2B. The 2nd-Line Territorial Force Divisions (57th–69th) with The Home-Service Divisions (71st–73rd) and 74th and 75th Divisions. London: HMSO. OCLC 4405016.
- James, Brigadier E.A. (1978). British Regiments 1914–18. London: Samson Books Limited. ISBN 0-906304-03-2.
- Perry, F.W. (1993). Order of Battle of Divisions Part 5B. Indian Army Divisions. Newport: Ray Westlake Military Books. ISBN 1-871167-23-X.
- Rinaldi, Richard A (2008). Order of Battle of the British Army 1914. Ravi Rikhye. ISBN 978-0-97760728-0.
- Westlake, Ray (1992). British Territorial Units 1914-18. Osprey Publishing. ISBN 978-1-85532-168-7.
- Westlake, Ray (1996). British Regiments at Gallipoli. Barnsley: Leo Cooper. ISBN 0-85052-511-X.
