= Wastage (military) =

Wastage was a British term used during the First World War. The term adapted Carl von Clausewitz's concept of 'Verbrauch' which, akin to wastage, also means the consumption of losses in terms of men, materials, and territories. It was used to describe the losses from those killed, injured, or from the loss of resources experienced during the war either when an attack advanced or when men died holding a defensive position. The British military also used the term to describe weapons left on the battlefield by fallen soldiers. On the "quietest days" of the war, the British lost an approximate average of 7,000 men killed and wounded per day to wastage. From 1915, British recruitment officials began to target certain sectors of the public, namely younger unmarried working-class men, for enlistment to fill quotas of the expected wastage losses in battles anticipated later in the war. This practice extended to include conscripts taken to fill the wastage recruitment quotas beginning in 1916.
