= XIX Brigade, Royal Horse Artillery (T.F.) =

Former horse artillery brigade of the British Army

- Active: January 1917 – 30 October 1919
- Country: United Kingdom
- Branch: British Army
- Type: Artillery
- Size: Battalion
- Part of: Imperial (later Australian) Mounted Division
- Equipment: Ordnance QF 15-pounder Ordnance QF 18-pounder Ordnance QF 13-pounder
- Engagements: World War I Sinai and Palestine 1917-18 First, Second and Third Battles of Gaza Battle of Beersheba Battle of Mughar Ridge Battle of Jerusalem Second Trans-Jordan Raid Capture of Damascus

XIX Brigade, Royal Horse Artillery (Territorial Force) was a Royal Horse Artillery brigade (Note: The basic organic unit of the Royal Artillery was, and is, the Battery. When grouped together they formed brigades, in the same way that infantry battalions or cavalry regiments were grouped together in brigades. At the outbreak of World War I, a field artillery brigade of headquarters (4 officers, 37 other ranks), three batteries (5 and 193 each), and a brigade ammunition column (4 and 154) had a total strength just under 800 so was broadly comparable to an infantry battalion (just over 1,000) or a cavalry regiment (about 550). Like an infantry battalion, an artillery brigade was usually commanded by a Lieutenant-Colonel. Artillery brigades were redesignated as regiments in 1938. Note that the battery strength refers to a battery of six guns; a four-gun battery would be about two thirds of this.) of the Territorial Force that was formed by the Egyptian Expeditionary Force in Palestine in January 1917 for the Imperial Mounted Division (later renamed Australian Mounted Division). It served with the division thereafter in the Sinai and Palestine Campaign and was broken up after the end of World War I.

== History ==
=== Formation ===
The Imperial Mounted Division was formed in Egypt in January 1917 with four cavalry brigades: the Australian 3rd and 4th Light Horse Brigades and the British 5th and 6th Mounted Brigades. Four British Territorial Force horse artillery batteries were assigned to the division to provide artillery support, one per brigade. XIX Brigade, Royal Horse Artillery (Territorial Force) was formed for the division with (Note: Frederick says the brigade was formed "about June 1917", that is after the Imperial Mounted Division was reorganized to form the Australian Mounted Division of three brigades / three batteries.)

Berkshire Battery, RHA (T.F.)
Nottinghamshire Battery, RHA (T.F.)
A Battery, HAC (T.F.)
B Battery, HAC (T.F.)

The batteries had been assigned to the 2nd South Midland, Nottinghamshire and Derbyshire, London, and South Eastern Mounted Brigades, respectively, at the outbreak of the war. Each was equipped with four Ehrhardt 15-pounder guns.

All four batteries had originally gone out to Egypt with the 2nd Mounted Division in April 1915, but did not proceed to Gallipoli when the division was dismounted for service there. Instead, they variously served on the Suez Canal Defences, as part of the Western Frontier Force in the Senussi Campaign, or in Aden where B Battery, HAC and Berkshire, RHA fought a sharp action at Sheikh Othman that removed the Turkish threat to Aden for the rest of the war. They rejoined 2nd Mounted Division on its return from Gallipoli in December 1915, however, the dismemberment of the division began almost immediately as units were posted to the Western Frontier Force, Suez Canal Defences or to various other commands.

In practice, the batteries were tactically attached to the mounted brigades, for example, Nottinghamshire RHA to the 3rd Light Horse Brigade and A Battery, HAC to the 4th Light Horse Brigade

=== Early service ===
The brigade, and its batteries, served with the Imperial Mounted Division in the Sinai and Palestine Campaign as part of the Desert Column. With the division, it took part in the advance across the Sinai. The batteries were re-equipped with four 18 pounders each in time for the First Battle of Gaza (26 – 27 March 1917). They also took part in the Second Battle of Gaza (17 – 19 April 1917).

=== Reorganised ===
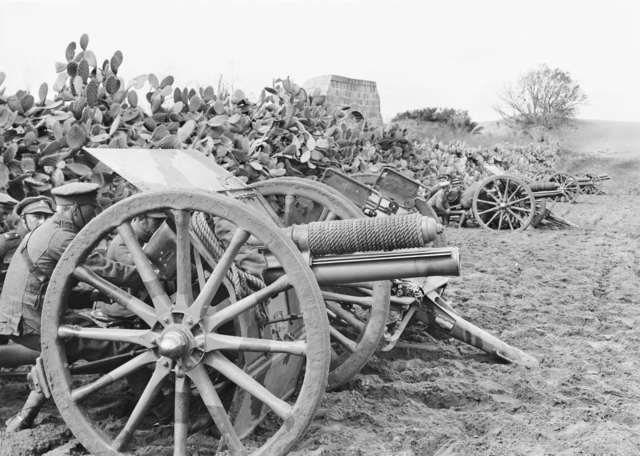
Gunners of A Battery, Honourable Artillery Company, attached to the 4th Australian Light Horse Brigade, crouch between their 13 pounder quick fire field guns and a cactus hedge near Belah, Palestine, in March 1918.

In June 1917, the Desert Column was reorganised from two mounted divisions of four brigades each (ANZAC and Imperial Mounted Divisions) to three mounted divisions of three brigades each (ANZAC, Australian – Imperial Mounted Division renamed – and the new Yeomanry Mounted Division). Consequently, the British 6th Mounted Brigade, along with Berkshire RHA, was transferred from the Imperial to the Yeomanry Mounted Division on 27 June 1917. Berkshire RHA joined XX Brigade, RHA (T.F.) in the Yeomanry Mounted Division on 5 July. (Note: 6th Mounted Brigade was originally designated as the 2nd South Midland Mounted Brigade. Berkshire RHA had been formed in 1908 for this brigade and was mobilised with it in 1914.)

On 20 June 1917, the Imperial Mounted Division was redesignated as Australian Mounted Division as the majority of its troops were now Australian. On 12 August 1917, the Desert Column disappeared and the Desert Mounted Corps was formed. The batteries were still equipped with 18 pounders when the brigade was reorganised but were re-equipped with 13 pounders (four per battery) before the Third Battle of Gaza at the end of October 1917.

=== Later service ===
The brigade, and its batteries, served with the Australian Mounted Division throughout the rest of the Sinai and Palestine Campaign. As part of the Desert Mounted Corps, the division took part in the Third Battle of Gaza, in particular the Capture of Beersheba (31 October) and the Battle of Mughar Ridge (13 and 14 November), and the defence of Jerusalem against the Turkish counter-attacks (27 November – 3 December).

In March 1918, the 5th Mounted Brigade left the division for the new 2nd Mounted Division (Note: Not to be confused with the original 2nd Mounted Division that served dismounted at Gallipoli.) and was replaced by the newly formed 5th Light Horse Brigade; B Battery, HAC was attached to the brigade.

Still part of the Desert Mounted Corps, the division took part in the Second Trans-Jordan Raid (30 April – 4 May 1918). XIX Brigade, RHA supported the 4th Light Horse Brigade in the advance on the Jisr ed Damiye–Es Salt track on 30 April. The next day, a strong Turkish force attacked from the direction of Jisr ed Damiye and soon the artillery was in danger. B Battery, HAC was in the rear and managed to get away with all but one of their guns (stuck in a wadi) but the Nottinghamshire RHA and A Battery, HAC were less fortunate. Machine gun fire cut down the horse teams before the guns could be gotten away. XIX Brigade lost 9 guns in total, the only guns to be lost in action in the entire campaign.

It final action was the capture of Damascus (1 October).

=== Dissolved ===
After the Armistice of Mudros, the division was withdrawn to Egypt and started to demobilise. The last of the Australians returned home in April and May 1919. A and B Batteries, HAC were reduced to cadre in Egypt on 25 October 1919 and the brigade headquarters was disbanded in Egypt on 30 October 1919.

== Bibliography ==
- Becke, Archibald F. (1936). Order of Battle of Divisions Part 2A. The Territorial Force Mounted Divisions and the 1st-Line Territorial Force Divisions (42–56). London: HMSO. OCLC 4405016.
- Becke, Archibald F. (1945). Order of Battle of Divisions Part 4. The Army Council, G.H.Q.s, Armies and Corps, 1914-1919. London: HMSO. OCLC 4405016.
- Clarke, Dale (2004). British Artillery 1914–19 Field Army Artillery. Vol. 94 of New Vanguard Series. Oxford: Osprey Publishing. ISBN 1-84176-688-7.
- Farndale, General Sir Martin (1988). The Forgotten Fronts and the Home Base, 1914–18. History of the Royal Regiment of Artillery. Woolwich: The Royal Artillery Institution. ISBN 1-870114-05-1.
- Frederick, J.B.M. (1984). Lineage Book of British Land Forces 1660–1978. Wakefield, Yorkshire: Microform Academic Publishers. ISBN 1-85117-009-X.
- James, Brigadier E.A. (1978). British Regiments 1914–18. London: Samson Books Limited. ISBN 0-906304-03-2.
- Perry, F.W. (1992). Order of Battle of Divisions Part 5A. The Divisions of Australia, Canada and New Zealand and those in East Africa. Newport: Ray Westlake Military Books. ISBN 1-871167-25-6.
- Westlake, Ray (1992). British Territorial Units 1914–18. Osprey Publishing. ISBN 978-1-85532-168-7.
