= Berkshire Royal Horse Artillery =

Former British Army horse artillery battery

Berkshire Royal Horse Artillery 264th (Berkshire) Battery 80th (Berkshire) HAA Regiment 480th (Berkshire) HAA Regiment
- Active: 21 July 1908 – 14 October 1919; 7 February 1920–1 December 1944; 1 January 1947 – 31 December 1968
- Country: United Kingdom
- Branch: Territorial Army
- Type: Artillery
- Size: Battery (later Regiment)
- Part of: 2nd South Midland Mounted Brigade; II Brigade, RHA (T.F.); XIX Brigade, RHA (T.F.); XX Brigade, RHA (T.F.)
- peacetime HQ: Reading
- Equipment: Ordnance QF 15-pounder Ordnance QF 18-pounder Ordnance QF 13-pounder
- Engagements: First World War: South Arabia Sheikh Othman Sinai and Palestine 1916-18 First, Second, Third Battles of Gaza Battle of Beersheba (1917) Battle of Mughar Ridge Battle of Nebi Samwil Capture of Jerusalem Second Transjordan Raid Battle of Megiddo Capture of Damascus Second World War: Battle of Britain The Blitz Operation Torch Operation Husky Operation Avalanche Italian Campaign

The Berkshire Royal Horse Artillery was a Territorial Force Royal Horse Artillery battery that was formed in Berkshire in 1908. It saw active service during the First World War in the Middle East, notably at Aden and in particular in the Sinai and Palestine Campaign, from 1915 to 1918. A second line battery, 2/1st Berkshire RHA, served on the Western Front in 1917 and 1918 as part of an Army Field Artillery Brigade. After the Armistice, it was reconstituted as a Royal Field Artillery battery of the Territorial Army (TA), later being expanded into a full heavy anti-aircraft (HAA) regiment that served during the Second World War in the Battle of Britain and Blitz, in the assault landings in North Africa (Operation Torch), Sicily (Operation Husky) and Italy (Operation Avalanche). Postwar, it continued in the TA until 1968.

== Formation ==
The Territorial Force (TF) was formed on 1 April 1908 following the enactment of the Territorial and Reserve Forces Act 1907 (7 Edw.7, c.9) which combined and re-organised the old Volunteer Force, the Honourable Artillery Company and the Yeomanry. On formation, the TF contained 14 infantry divisions and 14 mounted yeomanry brigades. Each yeomanry brigade included a horse artillery battery and an ammunition column.

On 18 March 1908, Berkshire Royal Horse Artillery (Territorial Force) was proposed as a new unit and it was recognized by the Army Council on 21 July 1908 (and the ammunition column on 11 August 1908). The unit consisted of:

- Battery HQ at Yeomanry House, Castle Hill, Reading, with a section at Ascot
- 2nd South Midland Ammunition Column also at Reading

The battery was equipped with four Ehrhardt 15-pounder guns and allocated as artillery support to the 2nd South Midland Mounted Brigade. (Note: Frederick says Berkshire RHA was assigned to the 1st South Midland Mounted Brigade and Warwickshire Royal Horse Artillery to the 2nd South Midland Mounted Brigade. This is contradicted by the contemporary Army List and the authoritative Order of Battle)

== First World War ==
In accordance with the Territorial and Reserve Forces Act 1907 (7 Edw.7, c.9) which brought the Territorial Force into being, the TF was intended to be a home defence force for service during wartime and members could not be compelled to serve outside the country. However, on the outbreak of war on 4 August 1914, many members volunteered for Imperial Service. Therefore, TF units were split into 1st Line (liable for overseas service) and 2nd Line (home service for those unable or unwilling to serve overseas) units. 2nd Line units performed the home defence role, although in fact most of these were also posted abroad in due course.

=== 1/1st Berkshire ===
The 1st Line battery was embodied with the 2nd South Midland Mounted Brigade on 4 August 1914 at the outbreak of the First World War. Initially, the brigade concentrated in Berkshire and on 5 August 1914 was assigned to the 1st Mounted Division. A decision was made to form a new mounted division from the mounted brigades in and around the Churn area of Berkshire. On 2 September 1914, 2nd Mounted Division, with Headquarters at Goring, came into being and 2nd South Midland Mounted Brigade was transferred to the new division. I Brigade and II Brigade, RHA (T.F.) (Note: The basic organic unit of the Royal Artillery was, and is, the Battery. When grouped together they formed brigades, in the same way that infantry battalions or cavalry regiments were grouped together in brigades. At the outbreak of the First World War, a field artillery brigade of headquarters (4 officers, 37 other ranks), three batteries (5 and 193 each), and a brigade ammunition column (4 and 154) had a total strength just under 800 so was broadly comparable to an infantry battalion (just over 1,000) or a cavalry regiment (about 550). Like an infantry battalion, an artillery brigade was usually commanded by a Lieutenant-Colonel. Artillery brigades were redesignated as regiments in 1938. Note that the battery strength refers to a battery of six guns; a four-gun battery would be about two thirds of this.) were formed for the division and the battery was assigned to II Brigade, RHA at Churn, along with Nottinghamshire RHA and A Battery and B Battery, Honourable Artillery Company. (Note: B Battery, HAC joined the division from Canterbury and was attached to 2nd South Midland Mounted Brigade. It replaced Warwickshire RHA in I Brigade when it was posted to France on 1 November.)

In November 1914, the division moved to Norfolk on coastal defence duties. Artillery headquarters was established at Cromer, before joining the divisional headquarters at Hanworth in December, and Berkshire RHA was at Little Walsingham (2nd South Midland Mounted Brigade was at Fakenham).

==== Overseas service ====
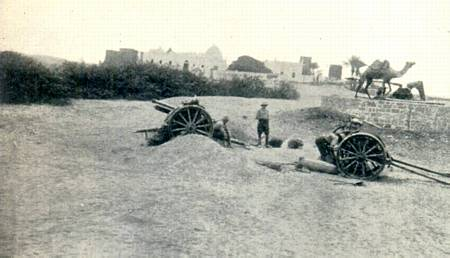
A QF 15 pounder of B Battery, Honourable Artillery Company at Sheik Othman, Aden.

In March 1915, the division was put on warning for overseas service. In early April, the division starting leaving Avonmouth and the last elements landed at Alexandria before the end of the month. By the middle of May, the horse artillery batteries were near Ismaïlia on Suez Canal Defences. On 14 July 1915, Berkshire RHA (along with B Battery, HAC and 28th Indian Brigade) left for Aden. They fought a sharp action at Sheikh Othman on 20 July that removed the Turkish threat to Aden for the rest of the war, before returning to Egypt.

The 2nd Mounted Division was dismounted in August 1915 and served at Gallipoli. The artillery batteries and ammunition columns, signal troops, mobile veterinary sections, Mounted Brigade Transport and Supply Columns and two of the Field Ambulances were left behind in Egypt. The division returned from Gallipoli in December 1915 and was reformed and remounted. On 10 December 1915, Berkshire RHA briefly rejoined the division from Ismailia, Suez Canal Defences; on 17 January 1916 it was transferred with 2nd South Midland Mounted Brigade to the Western Frontier Force.

==== Imperial Mounted Division ====
The Imperial Mounted Division was formed in Egypt in January 1917; 2nd South Midland Mounted Brigade (by now numbered as 6th Mounted Brigade) was one of the four cavalry brigades selected to form the division. Berkshire RHA joined the division on formation and was assigned to XIX Brigade, Royal Horse Artillery (T.F.). (Note: The other three batteries were Nottinghamshire RHA, A Battery, HAC and B Battery, HAC. All four batteries were originally part of the 2nd Mounted Division.) In practice, the battery remained attached to its mounted brigade.

The battery, and its brigade, served with the Imperial Mounted Division in the Sinai and Palestine Campaign as part of the Desert Column. With the division, it took part in the advance across the Sinai. The battery was re-equipped with four 18 pounders in time for the First Battle of Gaza (26 – 27 March 1917). It also took part in the Second Battle of Gaza (17 – 19 April 1917).

In June 1917, the Desert Column was reorganised from two mounted divisions of four brigades each (ANZAC and Imperial Mounted Divisions) to three mounted divisions of three brigades each (ANZAC, Australian – Imperial Mounted Division renamed – and the new Yeomanry Mounted Division). Consequently, the 6th Mounted Brigade, along with Berkshire RHA, was transferred from the Imperial to the Yeomanry Mounted Division on 27 June 1917.

==== Yeomanry Mounted / 1st Mounted / 4th Cavalry Divisions ====
Berkshire, RHA (by now re-equipped with four 13 pounders) joined the Yeomanry Mounted Division with 6th Mounted Brigade on 27 June 1917 and transferred to XX Brigade, Royal Horse Artillery (T.F.) when it joined the division on 5 July 1917. The battery remained with the division when it was restructured and indianized (Note: British divisions were converted to the British Indian Army standard whereby brigades only retained one British regiment or battalion and most support units were Indian (artillery excepted).) as the 1st Mounted Division (Note: Not to be confused with the original 1st Mounted Division which became 1st Cyclist Division in July 1916. It never left the United Kingdom.) (from 24 April 1918) and later renamed as 4th Cavalry Division (23 July 1918).

During its time with the Yeomanry Mounted Division, the division served as part of the Egyptian Expeditionary Force in Palestine. From 31 October it took part in the Third Battle of Gaza, including the Battle of Beersheba (in GHQ Reserve) and the Capture of the Sheria Position under the Desert Mounted Corps (DMC). Still with the DMC, it took part in the Battle of Mughar Ridge on 13 and 14 November and the Battle of Nebi Samwil from 17 to 24 November. From 27 to 29 November, it withstood the Turkish counter-attacks during the Capture of Jerusalem.

Once the division was restructured and renamed, it served with the DMC for the rest of the war, taking part in the Second Transjordan Raid (30 April to 4 May 1918) and the Final Offensive, in particular the Battle of Megiddo (19 to 25 September) and the Capture of Damascus (1 October).

The 4th Cavalry Division remained in Palestine on occupation duties after the end of the war. However, demobilization began immediately and most of the British war time units had left by May 1919. The Berkshire battery were reduced to cadre in Egypt on 14 October 1919.

=== 2/1st Berkshire ===
2/1st Berkshire RHA (T.F.)
- Active: 1914 – 1919
- Country: United Kingdom
- Branch: British Army
- Type: Artillery
- Size: Battery
- Part of: 2/2nd South Midland Mounted Brigade; CLVIII Brigade, RFA
- Equipment: Ordnance BL 15 pounder Ordnance BLC 15-pounder Ordnance QF 18-pounder
- Engagements: First World War Western Front

Berkshire RHA formed a 2nd line in 1914, initially designated as the Berkshire (Reserve) Battery RHA and later given a fractional designation as 2/1st Berkshire Battery, RHA.

The battery joined the 2nd line 2/2nd South Midland Mounted Brigade when it was formed in September 1914. On 6 March 1915, the 2/2nd Mounted Division was formed to replace 2nd Mounted Division which had been warned for overseas service. The brigade joined the division on East Coast Defences in March 1915 and concentrated at King's Lynn with the battery at North Runcton. (Note: 2/1st Nottinghamshire RHA, 2/1st Warwickshire RHA, and 2/A Battery, HAC formed the other three batteries of the division.)

The batteries of the division were quite unready for war. Three had no horses, the fourth had just 23; three batteries had over 200 men on average, but the other just 91. The Berkshire battery was only issued with sights for its Ordnance BL 15 pounders in December 1915, but had no ammunition. On 17 January 1916 it received four slightly more modern Ordnance BLC 15-pounders, eight ammunition wagons and 210 rounds of ammunition per gun.

The battery remained with the division when it was redesignated as 3rd Mounted Division in March 1916 and as 1st Mounted Division in July 1916. In September 1916, the battery was attached to the 7th Cyclist Brigade in 2nd Cyclist Division (former 4th Mounted Division) until the division was broken up on 16 November 1916.

The battery (along with 2/1st Shropshire RHA) joined CLVIII Brigade, RFA when it was reformed. The original CLVIII Brigade, RFA was formed for 35th Division in Accrington and Burnley from December 1914. It was broken up in France between 8 January and 28 February 1917. The two RHA batteries provided the manpower for the Brigade Ammunition Column. The battery (personnel only) disembarked at Boulogne on 24 May 1917. It was equipped with 18 pounders and the brigade became an Army Field Brigade. (Note: Army Field Artillery Brigades were artillery brigades that were excess to the needs of the divisions, withdrawn to form an artillery reserve.) On 6 July 1917, the battery was redesignated as C/CLVIII Battery and 2/1st Shropshire RHA became A/CLVIII Battery.

At the Armistice, the battery (by now made up to six 18 pounders) was still with CLVIII Army Brigade, RFA serving as Army Troops with the Fifth Army.

== Interwar years ==
When the TF was reconstituted on 7 February 1920 the Berkshire RHA formed a battery (later numbered 264th (Berkshire) Battery) in 1st South Midland Brigade, RFA (later 66th (South Midland) Field Brigade, RA) and ceased to be a Royal Horse Artillery battery.

In the late 1930s, particularly at the time of the Munich Crisis in September–October 1938, the need for improved anti-aircraft (AA) defences became apparent, and a programme of converting existing TA units was pushed forward. On 1 October 1938, 264 Bty was separated from 66th Field Brigade, converted to the heavy anti-aircraft (HAA) role, and expanded into a full brigade as 80th (Berkshire) Anti-Aircraft Brigade, organised as follows:

- Regimental Headquarters (RHQ) at Yeomanry House, Reading
- 249 (Berkshire RHA) AA Battery at Reading
- 250 (Reading) AA Battery at Reading, raised 1 October 1938
- 251 (Buckinghamshire) AA Battery at Slough, raised 1 November 1938
- 252 (City of Oxford) AA Battery at Oxford, raised 1 November 1938

(The remainder of 66th Field Brigade at Bristol became 76th (Gloucestershire) AA Brigade.)

== Second World War ==
=== Mobilisation ===
The new regiment (RA brigades were redesignated as regiments from January 1939) formed part of 47 AA Brigade in 5th AA Division, which had the responsibility for defending Southampton. In February 1939 the UK's AA defences came under the control of a new Anti-Aircraft Command. In June a partial mobilisation of the TA was begun in a process known as 'couverture', whereby each AA unit did a month's tour of duty in rotation to man selected AA and searchlight positions. On 24 August, ahead of the declaration of war, AA Command was fully mobilised at its war stations. The 'Phoney war' that followed was an opportunity for training and equipping the AA defences. In June 1940 the RA's AA regiments were designated Heavy AA (HAA) to distinguish them from the new Light AA (LAA) units being formed.

=== Battle of Britain ===
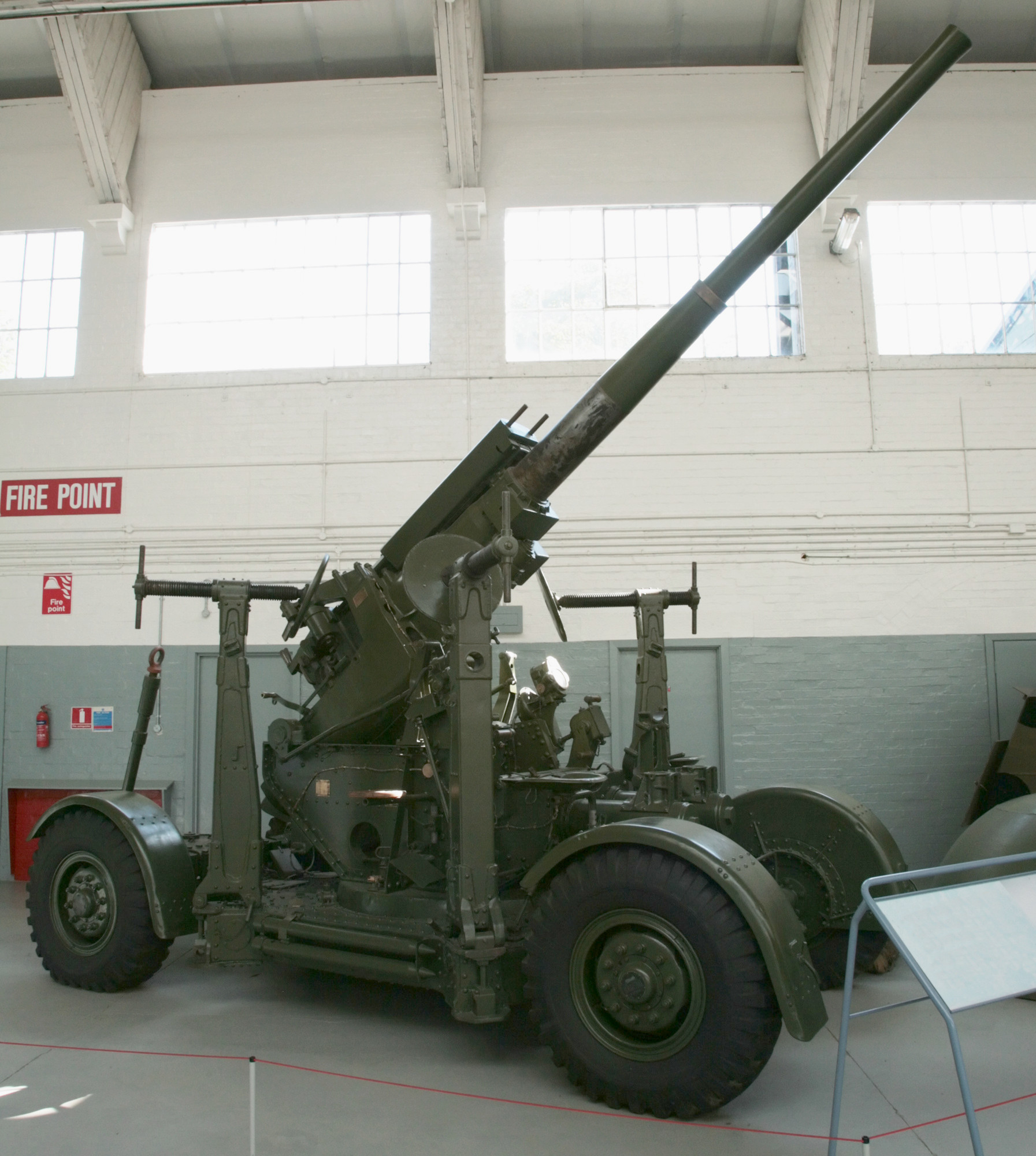
3.7-inch HAA gun preserved at Imperial War Museum Duxford.

After the British army's evacuation from Dunkirk, the South Coast ports such as Southampton and Portsmouth became prime targets for attacks by the German Luftwaffe in the so-called 'Channel Battles' that preceded the Battle of Britain. By now, the regiment had been transferred to 35 AA Bde defending Portsmouth. In July, the regiment was joined by RHQ and 12 HAA Bty of 6th HAA Rgt, which had got away from Dunkirk without its guns and equipment. 12 HAA Bty was split into four sections, with Battery HQ, A and C Sections under 252 HAA Bty at Brownwich, Fareham, B Section at Fort Southwick and D Section at Fort Nelson, both under 250 HAA Bty. The Dunkirk veterans who had lost their old 3-inch guns had the opportunity to become familiar with the modern 3.7-inch guns operated by 80th HAA Rgt, even though these had already been through the hands of several units and their gun stores were incomplete.

Shortly after this, RHQ of 6 HAA Rgt was sent, with 250/80 HAA Bty under command, to Kent in a scheme codenamed 'Bovril' to defend roads leading away from the South Coast in case of invasion, and at the same time to reconnoitre and prepare AA gun sites for when guns became available. This was done at Ashford, Canterbury, Edenbridge, Sevenoaks, Tenterden and Tunbridge Wells. By the end of August, 6 HAA Rgt was commanding a group of batteries, including its own 12 HAA Bty and 251/80 HAA Bty, as a mobile force in Kent (for which 12/6 Bty had to borrow vehicles from 251/80).

The Battle of Britain was now under way, and during late July and throughout August the batteries had fleeting engagements with small numbers of raiders along the South Coast. There were attacks on Southampton and Portsmouth – a particularly bad raid on Portsmouth on 24 August – and on Lee-on-Solent and Gosport airfields. During early September the pattern of fleeting targets – but no 'kills' – for all the batteries continued by day and night. Most of the 3-inch guns in the battle area had been replaced by 3.7s, together with the new Sperry Predictor No 2.

Formation sign of 5 AA Division.

After its heavy losses so far during the Battle of Britain, the Luftwaffe changed tactics and started bombing London. On 9 September, 12 HAA Bty left 80 HAA Rgt's command and went to strengthen the London Inner Artillery Zone (IAZ). As the raids against London worsened, RHQ of 6 HAA Rgt with two sections of 250/80 HAA Bty were brought from Kent on 14 September to take over more sites in the London IAZ. Large daylight raids against London on 15 September were intercepted by Royal Air Force (RAF) fighters, but there were few spare fighters to deal with the simultaneous attacks on the South Coast, of which the guns of 5 AA Division had to bear the brunt.

=== The Blitz ===
After the defeat of 15 September the Luftwaffe concentrated on night raids – the London Blitz – which went on night after night. However, there were also five major raids on Portsmouth and five more on Southampton during the winter of 1940–41.

The regiment provided a cadre of experienced officers and other ranks as the basis for a new 412 HAA Bty formed on 16 January 1941 at 209th HAA Training Rgt, Blandford; this battery later joined 124th HAA Rgt

In late February 1941, while the Blitz was still continuing, 249 HAA Bty was rostered for overseas service and transferred to the War Office Reserve, followed a few weeks later by the rest of the regiment, though it temporarily remained part of AA Command.

=== 249 (Berkshire RHA) HAA Bty ===
An advanced party of 249 (Berkshire RHA) HAA Bty arrived in Iceland in March 1941, followed by the main body with four 3.7-inch guns. It was there to reinforce the AA coverage for 'Alabaster Force', which had occupied the island since May 1940 to deny it to German forces. There was little action apart from occasional engagements of Junkers Ju 88 or Focke-Wulf Fw 200 Condor long-range reconnaissance aircraft. Later 12th HAA Rgt HQ arrived to take command of the independent HAA batteries on the island. In June 1941 the decision was taken to hand the occupation of Iceland over to the (still neutral) United States, and shortly afterwards all AA positions were handed over and the troops returned to the UK.

=== 251 (Buckinghamshire) HAA Bty ===
RHQ of 80th HAA Rgt, together with 250 and 252 HAA Btys, left AA Command in July 1941, while 251 HAA Bty remained as an independent battery. On 4 September the battery joined 131st (Mixed) HAA Rgt to convert to a 'Mixed' establishment in which two-thirds of the posts were filled by women of the Auxiliary Territorial Service (ATS). However, this was rescinded and 251 HAA Bty left again on 7 October to become part of the WO Reserve as an all-male battery. It left the UK in December 1941 for West Africa Command, where it stayed until 1944. Many men from this battery formed the cadres for units of the West African Artillery, and went with their units on active service to Burma.

=== Mobile training ===
In between training for overseas service, AA units in the WO Reserve were regularly loaned back to AA Command. On 10 October 1941, 80th HAA Rgt with 250 and 252 HAA Btys joined the Humber Gun Defence Area under 39 AA Bde. The battery HQs were established at Scunthorpe on the south bank and Halsham on the north bank, and the sixteen 3.7-inch guns the batteries brought were emplaced in four-gun sites. The regiment left (with its guns) on 1 January 1942.

During the summer of 1942 First Army began to assemble for Operation Torch, the Allied landings in North Africa. 80th HAA Regiment was assigned to 22 AA Bde in this army and was brought up to full war establishment when it was joined by the independent 194 HAA Bty (originally part of 60th (City of London) HAA Rgt which had seen action in the Battle of France and the Dunkirk evacuation) and by the ancillary units necessary for mobile warfare:

- RHQ, 194, 250, 252 HAA Btys
- 80 HAA Rgt Signal Section, Royal Corps of Signals
- 80 HAA Workshop Section, Royal Electrical and Mechanical Engineers (HQ and 252 Section only)
- 80 HAA Rgt Platoon, Royal Army Service Corps

=== Operation Torch ===
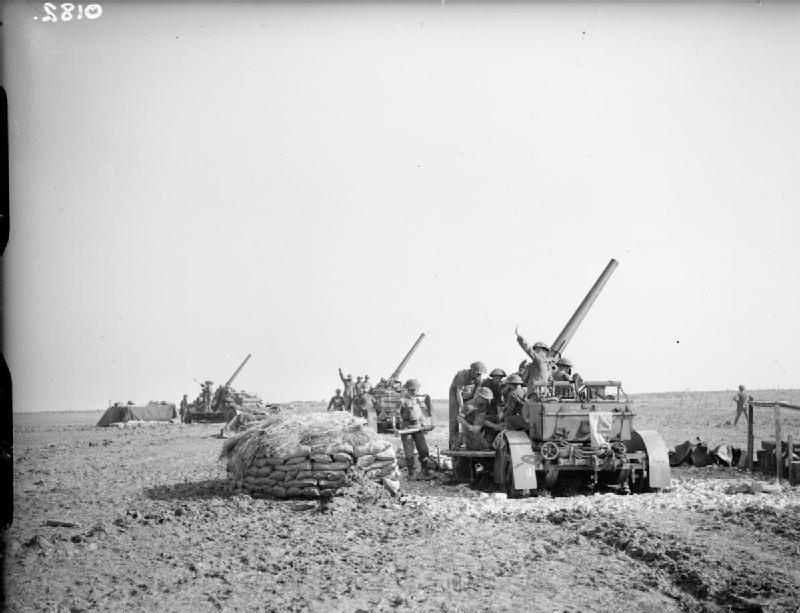
3-inch AA guns on cruciform travelling carriages.

The 'Torch' convoy assembled in the Clyde in October 1942 and set sail through the Straits of Gibraltar. 22 AA Brigade was the only AA formation trained in mobile operations and amphibious warfare, and was tasked with landing early in the operation to provide AA cover for the beaches, ports and airfields. The best-trained regiments were selected for the initial assault, with 80th HAA Rgt supplying one battery (194 HAA Bty) and 58th (Kent) HAA Rgt sending two; 250 HAA Battery was among the follow-up echelons. Advance AA parties landed with the assault troops on beaches outside Algiers on 8 November, to be followed later by their heavy equipment. The HAA batteries were equipped with the older 3-inch gun on a modernised trailer, rather than the newer 3.7-inch, because the lighter 3-inch was easier and quicker to deploy in the rough country anticipated for the campaign. After the initial fighting, in which 194 HAA Bty suffered a number of casualties, 22 AA Bde accompanied the leading elements of First Army on their long march eastwards towards Tunisia, although the whole AA deployment was hampered by congestion at Algiers docks and the fact that AA guns had been given low priority in loading the supply ships. The follow-up elements suffered casualties of men and equipment when their ships were attacked on the way to North Africa: 80th HAA Rgt lost 71 men when HM Transport J-43 was sunk by enemy action. A team from 80th HAA Rgt and the Royal Engineers spent a month unsuccessfully trying to recover 3-inch guns from sunken merchant ships in Bougie harbour.

On 9 November, RHQ under Lt-Col J.A.S. Crum, with regimental Signals and REME and the assault echelons of 252 HAA Bty, moved to Liverpool for embarkation on HM Transport P-29 (RMS Orion) to join a convoy that sailed from the Clyde on 14 November. Also on the Orion under the regiment's command were the rear echelons of 58th HAA Rgt: 264 HAA Bty and the REME workshops. The HAA units disembarked at Algiers on 22 November, where they remained in a transit camp while a party of drivers was sent forward aboard HMS Queen Emma to Bône where the motor transport was unloaded from SS Inventor on 27 November. RHQ, with 252/80 and 264/58 Btys, followed them to Bône on a two-day rail journey, arriving on 4 December, with 252 HAA Bty in action the same night against a heavy air raid. RHQ of 80th HAA Rgt was under 66 AA Bde, and had 207/58, 217/72 and 252/80 HAA Btys under its command, while 194 and 250 HAA Btys remained detached under V Corps.

During December, there were air raids over Bône on most nights and frequent daylight raids by fighter-bombers, the harbour and airfield being primary targets. On 6 January 1943, the regiment went forward to Souk-el-Khemis Airfield to join 22 AA Bde, leaving behind its signals and REME, together with 207 and 217 HAA Btys. 250 HAA Bty was already at Souk-el-Khemis, but in early February it moved forward again to Testour, where it was later joined by the regiment's advanced HQ, camouflaged in an olive grove. On 11 February, the regiment finally had 194 and 250 HAA Btys under its command, operating under 78th Division, though 252 HAA Bty had now moved up from Bône and was detached with 46th Division throughout March.

The regiment was stationed close behind the Allied front line, and 250 HAA Battery's gun-laying radar was the first set sited in the forward areas. On 14 February Testour was attacked by Junkers Ju 87 Stukas, one of which targeted a gunsite of 250 HAA Bty and killed one man. The following day, 194 HAA Bty came under enemy shellfire. When guns of 250 HAA Bty were moved up to support 1 (Guards) Bde on 17 February, they were tasked with anti-tank (A/Tk) as well as AA defence until specialist A/Tk units arrived. This was repeated when German tanks were reported in the vicinity after the Battle of Kasserine Pass, and soon the regiment was running courses in A/Tk gunnery.

22 AA Brigade reorganised its commitments during April: 194 HAA Bty came under the command of 1st Armoured Division at Souk-el-Arba Airfield, 250 HAA Bty went back to Souk-el-Khemis airfield to support No. 242 Group RAF under the command of 71st (Forth) HAA Rgt, and 252 HAA Bty was under 78th Division, thus leaving RHQ (which moved to Medjez el Bab) with no batteries under its command. There was still considerable Luftwaffe activity, and the batteries scored a number of 'kills'. On 1 May 194 and 252 HAA Btys returned to regimental command, in support of 7th and 6th Armoured Divisions respectively. These formations were involved in Operation Vulcan, the final advance on Tunis, and while liaising with them on 6 May Lt-Col Crum and one of his officers were captured by German troops. They were released when Tunis fell the following day; Lt-Col Crum had been wounded, but soon returned to duty. 80th HAA Regiment claimed 11 'kills' during the Tunisian Campaign.

=== Operation Husky ===
Even before the final surrender of Axis forces in Tunisia, 80th HAA Rgt was withdrawn via Souk-el-Khemis to Bougie, arriving on 16 May. It immediately began training with 62 AA Bde for the forthcoming Allied invasion of Sicily (Operation Husky). For the landings on Sicily, eight composite beach groups were formed to defend the landing points as soon as possible after Zero Hour. 194 HAA Battery was assigned to 20 Beach Group and RHQ and 252 HAA Bty to 21 Beach Group. While they were training, 250 HAA Bty was deployed to defend the area, with one Troop at Djidjelli airfield.

The availability of Landing Ships, Tank (LSTs) made it feasible to land suitably waterproofed 3.7-inch guns and GL radar sets in the first wave of the attack. The HAA Troops were equipped with a new GL radar system, the No 3 Mark III, or 'Baby Maggie'. Devised by 62 AA Bde, this had its transmitter, receiver, aerial array and operating display all carried in a two-wheeled trailer towed by a 3-ton truck. 80th HAA Regiment's 'Maggies' were late arriving for embarkation, which was rushed.

The assault landings began at 02.45 on 10 July 1943. As in 'Torch', the advance parties of the AA units attached to the beach groups landed from Landing Craft Infantry (LCIs) as infantry prepared for a firefight, but there was only light opposition and they were soon able to move to the sites selected for gun positions when the LCTs arrived about 4 hours later. Unfortunately, 194 HAA Bty lost its guns in a shipboard fire on the way to the beaches. However, it joined in the AA defence of Pachino airfield, which had been captured without difficulty and was being repaired for RAF use despite frequent day and night raids. 252 HAA Battery joined in the defence of XXX Corps' beaches, although the 'Baby Maggies' had failed to stand up to the rough handling of the landings. More importantly, radio communications with the AA HQ ship broke down for the first 48 hours after landing, and defensive fire was reduced to crude 'barrage' methods.

After the landings, Eighth Army made rapid progress up the east coast of Sicily and the follow-up AA forces began to land. 62 AA Brigade HQ arrived in Syracuse on 17 July, bringing the rest of 80th HAA Rgt, and took responsibility for Pachino and Cassibile Airfields.

=== Operation Avalanche ===
The Allied campaign continued with the invasion of mainland Italy, first across the Strait of Messina (Operation Baytown) on 3 September, where 80th HAA Rgt (194 and 250 HAA Btys) provided AA cover from Messina, followed on 9 September by landings at Salerno (Operation Avalanche). For 'Avalanche', 252 HAA Bty was in No 4 Beach Group under 12 AA Bde. This time there was no surprise, and the LSTs and LCIs came under air attack and then heavy artillery fire as they approached the beaches. However, casualties among the AA troops were light and all the breach groups landed successfully: the first HAA guns were in action 4–6 hours after landings began. Opposition remained strong, and reinforcements poured into a tightly constricted beachhead while heavy fighting continued nearby. Although early warning and communications again proved a problem, the HAA sites were able to use their GL radar to fire concentrations against raiders. On 17 September the advance from the beachhead towards Naples began: so eager were the AA units that Brigadier Mortimer Wheeler of 12 AA Bde proposed using a column of AA troops to break out towards Pompeii, though the scheme was vetoed by X Corps.

Once Naples had been captured, 12 AA Bde's units were brought in by road and landing craft and defended the port from 1 October until relieved three weeks later, during which time it faced one serious air raid. It then moved up to rejoin X Corps against the Volturno Line. The rest of 80th HAA Rgt remained on Sicily for the rest of the year, first at Messina and later at Catania airfield, under the command of 73 AA Bde. It joined 12 AA Bde in January 1944, by which time its former CO, James Crum, had been promoted to command 8 AA Bde.

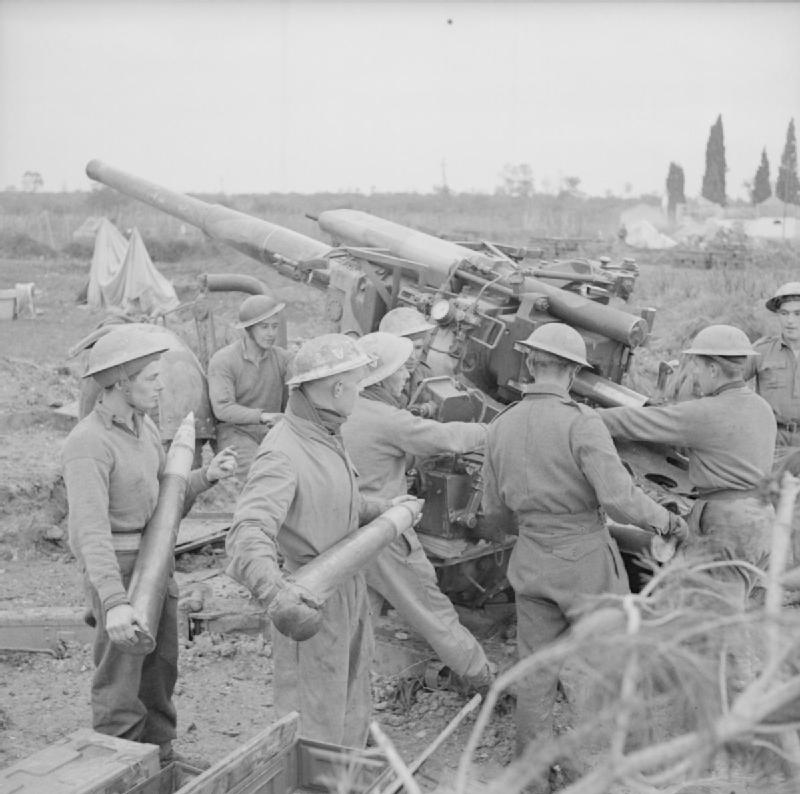
3.7-inch HAA gun in action in the field artillery role in Italy, December 1943.

In January 1944, 12 AA Bde was sent forward to cover the preparations for X Corps' crossing of the Garigliano, protecting assembly areas and ferry sites as well as routes and airfields. By April, 80th HAA Rgt had transferred back to 62 AA Bde, which was engaged in airfield defence for Fifth US Army. Once Fifth Army had captured Rome in June 1944 12 AA Bde deployed its units to defend the bridges over the Tiber and the port of Piombino. Then when relieved it was able to follow close behind Fifth Army. Although the Luftwaffe's losses meant the air threat was lowered, HAA batteries of 62 AA Bde also employed their versatile long-range 3.7-inch guns in a medium artillery role against ground targets. This included counter-battery (CB), defensive fire (DF) and harassing fire (HF) shoots, but also air-burst shoots against entrenched positions, and destruction of hard targets such as buildings.

Once Fifth Army had crossed the Arno, it faced the Serchio and the defences of the Gothic Line. On 26 December the German forces put in a major counterattack, Unternehmen Wintergewitter (Operation Winter Storm), between Lucca and Pistoia aimed at retaking the port of Livorno (Leghorn). 62 AA Brigade was well to the front in the resulting Battle of Garfagnana, with LAA regiments acting as infantry and anti-tank gunners, while the HAA regiments acted as divisional medium artillery. 80th HAA Regiment answered 166 calls for fire with 5011 rounds fired. Having beaten off the attack, IV US Corps advanced into the mountains accompanied by 80th HAA Rgt, with 194 HAA Bty deploying in icebound conditions at 2,500 feet (760 m). There was little activity by the Luftwaffe, so the ample stocks of 3.7-inch AA ammunition were used to help IV US Corps take the well-fortified mountain strongpoints.

However, the Allied forces in Italy were suffering an acute manpower shortage, and surplus AA units were being disbanded in increasing numbers. On 18 December 1944 it was the turn of 80th (Berkshire) HAA Regiment, which was placed in suspended animation and its personnel dispersed.

== Postwar ==
When the TA was reconstituted on 1 January 1947, the regiment reformed at Reading as 480th (Berkshire) Heavy Anti-Aircraft Regiment in 73 AA Bde (the wartime 47 AA Bde, based in Reading). AA Command was disbanded on 10 March 1955 and there were wholesale amalgamations amongst its units. 480th HAA Regiment merged with 536th (Surrey) Light Anti-Aircraft/Searchlight Rgt and 645th (Buckinghamshire) LAA Rgt (formerly the 1st Buckinghamshire (TA) Battalion of the Oxfordshire and Buckinghamshire Light Infantry) to form P (Berkshire and Oxfordshire) Battery in a new 431st Light Anti-Aircraft Regiment, with HQ remaining at Reading.

Another round of mergers in 1961 saw 431st LAA Rgt absorbed by 299th (Royal Buckinghamshire Yeomanry, Queen's Own Oxfordshire Hussars and Berkshire) Field Regiment, in which R (Berkshire) Battery continued the Berkshire RHA lineage. This lasted until 1967 when the TA was converted into the Territorial and Army Volunteer Reserve and the unit at Reading became B (Berkshire Artillery) Company in the Royal Berkshire Territorials. However, this regiment was reduced to a cadre in 1969, and the Berkshire RHA lineage ended.

== Honorary Colonel ==
Col A.T. Loyd, OBE, was appointed Honorary Colonel of 80th (Berkshire) HAA Regiment on its formation on 1 October 1938.

== See also ==
- List of Territorial Force horse artillery batteries 1908

== Bibliography ==
- Maj A.F. Becke,History of the Great War: Order of Battle of Divisions, Part 2a: The Territorial Force Mounted Divisions and the 1st-Line Territorial Force Divisions (42–56), London: HM Stationery Office, 1935/Uckfield: Naval & Military Press, 2007, ISBN 1-847347-39-8.
- Maj A.F. Becke,History of the Great War: Order of Battle of Divisions, Part 3b: New Army Divisions (30–41) and 63rd (R.N.) Division, London: HM Stationery Office, 1939/Uckfield: Naval & Military Press, 2007, ISBN 1-847347-41-X.
- Clarke, Dale (2004). British Artillery 1914–19 Field Army Artillery. Vol. 94 of New Vanguard Series. Oxford: Osprey Publishing. ISBN 1-84176-688-7.
- Basil Collier, History of the Second World War, United Kingdom Military Series: The Defence of the United Kingdom, London: HM Stationery Office, 1957.
- Farndale, Martin (1988). History of the Royal Regiment of Artillery: The Forgotten Fronts and the Home Base 1914–18. Woolwich: Royal Artillery Institution. ISBN 1-870114-05-1.
- Gen Sir Martin Farndale, History of the Royal Regiment of Artillery: The Years of Defeat: Europe and North Africa, 1939–1941, Woolwich: Royal Artillery Institution, 1988/London: Brasseys, 1996, ISBN 1-85753-080-2.
- J.B.M. Frederick, Lineage Book of British Land Forces 1660–1978, Vol I, Wakefield, Microform Academic, 1984, ISBN 1-85117-007-3.
- Frederick, J.B.M. (1984). Lineage Book of British Land Forces 1660–1978. Vol. II. Wakefield, Yorkshire: Microform Academic Publishers. ISBN 1-85117-009-X.
- Gen Sir William Jackson, History of the Second World War, United Kingdom Military Series: The Mediterranean and Middle East, Vol VI: Victory in the Mediterranean, Part I|: June to October 1944, London: HMSO, 1987/Uckfield, Naval & Military Press, 2004, ISBN 1-845740-71-8.
- James, Brigadier E.A. (1978). British Regiments 1914–18. London: Samson Books Limited. ISBN 0-906304-03-2.
- Joslen, H. F. (2003) [1960]. Orders of Battle: Second World War, 1939–1945. Uckfield, East Sussex: Naval and Military Press. ISBN 978-1-84342-474-1.
- Norman E.H. Litchfield, The Territorial Artillery 1908–1988 (Their Lineage, Uniforms and Badges), Nottingham: Sherwood Press, 1992, ISBN 0-9508205-2-0.
- Brig C.J.C. Molony,History of the Second World War, United Kingdom Military Series: The Mediterranean and Middle East, Vol V: The Campaign in Sicily 1943 and the Campaign in Italy 3rd September 1943 to 31st March 1944, London: HMSO, 1973/Uckfield, Naval & Military Press, 2004, ISBN 1-845740-69-6.
- Order of Battle of the British Armies in France, November 11th, 1918. France: General Staff, GHQ. 1918.* Perry, F.W. (1992). Order of Battle of Divisions Part 5A. The Divisions of Australia, Canada and New Zealand and those in East Africa. Newport: Ray Westlake Military Books. ISBN 1-871167-25-6.
- Perry, F.W. (1993). Order of Battle of Divisions Part 5B. Indian Army Divisions. Newport: Ray Westlake Military Books. ISBN 1-871167-23-X.
- Gen Sir Frederick Pile's despatch: "The Anti-Aircraft Defence of the United Kingdom from 28th July, 1939, to 15th April, 1945" London Gazette 18 December 1947
- Maj-Gen I.S.O. Playfair & Brig C.J.C. Molony, History of the Second World War, United Kingdom Military Series: The Mediterranean and Middle East, Vol IV: The Destruction of the Axis forces in Africa, London: HMSO, 1966/Uckfield, Naval & Military Press, 2004, ISBN 1-845740-68-8
- Rinaldi, Richard A (2008). Order of Battle of the British Army 1914. Ravi Rikhye. ISBN 978-0-97760728-0.
- Brig N.W. Routledge, History of the Royal Regiment of Artillery: Anti-Aircraft Artillery 1914–55, London: Royal Artillery Institution/Brassey's, 1994, ISBN 1-85753-099-3
- Westlake, Ray (1992). British Territorial Units 1914–18. Osprey Publishing. ISBN 978-1-85532-168-7.
- Patrick Walker, 6th Heavy Anti-Aircraft Regiment, Royal Artillery, Rev Edn, Gloucester: Choir Press, 2013, ISBN 978-0-9562190-4-6

=== External links ===
- British Military History
- The Drill Hall Project
- The Long, Long Trail
- Orders of Battle at Patriot Files Archived 12 June 2018 at the Wayback Machine
- Land Forces of Britain, the Empire and Commonwealth – Regiments.org (archive site)
- Graham Watson, The Territorial Army 1947
