= Gloucestershire Volunteer Artillery =

Gloucestershire Volunteer Artillery 1st (South Midland) Brigade, RFA (TF) 76th (Gloucestershire) AA Regiment, RA (TA) 266th (GVA) Battery, Royal Artillery
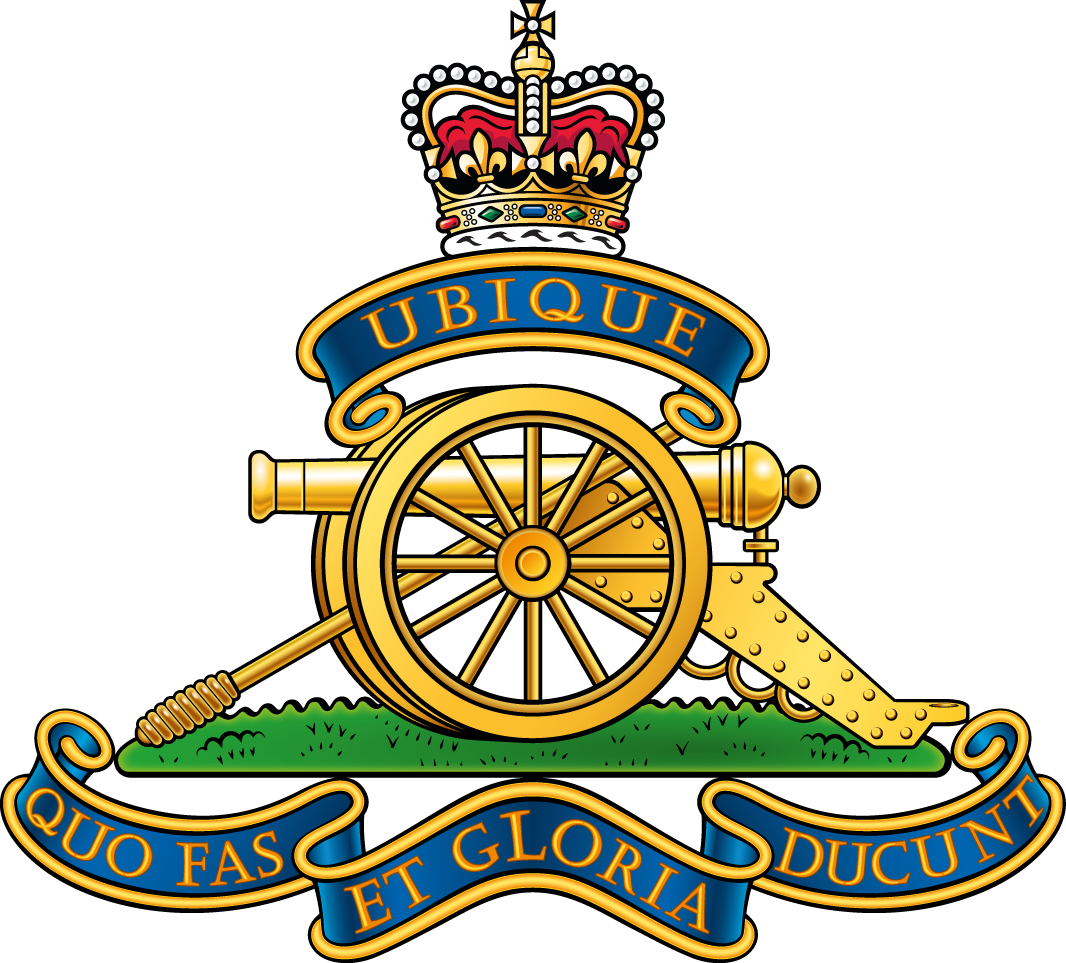
- Insignia of the Royal Artillery
- Active: 22 November 1859 – present
- Country: United Kingdom
- Branch: Territorial Force/Army Reserve
- Role: Field Artillery; Anti-Aircraft Artillery; Light Artillery
- Size: Up to 13 Batteries (to 1908); Brigade/Regiment (1908–55); One battery (present)
- Peacetime HQ: Whiteladies Road, Clifton, Bristol
- Nickname: The Bristol Gunners
- Motto: Fides et Audax
- Equipment: L118 light gun (present)
- Engagements: First World War: Western Front; Italian campaign; Second World War: The Blitz; North African campaign; Allied invasion of Sicily; Italian campaign

266 (Gloucestershire Volunteer Artillery) Battery Royal Artillery is a Royal Artillery unit of the British Army Reserve. It was first formed in Bristol in 1859 and served through the First World War as field artillery on the Western Front and in Italy. In the Second World War, it acted as anti-aircraft (AA) artillery. Reduced to a battery postwar, it has carried out a number of roles. At present, the battery fields the L118 in the offensive support role.

== Volunteer Artillery 1859-1908 ==
The enthusiasm for the Volunteer movement following an invasion scare in 1859 saw the creation of many Volunteer units composed of part-time soldiers eager to supplement the Regular British Army in time of need. In November that year, the Earl of Ducie, Lord Lieutenant of Gloucestershire, organised a unit of Gloucestershire Artillery Volunteers in Bristol under the command of Major Henry Bourchier Osborne Savile, a former Royal Artillery officer. The Society of Merchant Venturers in Bristol provided land in Whiteladies Road, Clifton, to build its headquarters (HQ), known as 'the Artillery Grounds'. Four smoothbore 18-pounder guns were obtained from Woolwich and arrived in Bristol in April 1860. Further Artillery Volunteer Corps (AVCs) were quickly organised in the county of Gloucestershire and in 1863 they were brigaded together (Note: In the Royal Artillery prior to 1938 a brigade was a lieutenant-colonel's command consisting of independent batteries 'brigaded' together; it was not comparable with an infantry or cavalry brigade commanded by a brigadier-general. After 1938 the RA updated the terminology from 'brigade' to 'regiment'. In the Territorials, unlike the Regulars, unit heritage is carried by the brigade/regiment, rather than the battery.) with those from neighbouring Somerset (dates are those of the first officers' commissions):

1st Administrative Brigade, Gloucestershire Artillery Volunteers

- HQ: Whiteladies Road, Clifton
- 1st (Bristol) Gloucestershire AVC (21 December 1859; initially five batteries, No 6 Battery raised October 1872)
- 2nd (Newnham on Severn) Gloucestershire AVC (1 March 1860)
- 3rd (Gloucester) Gloucestershire AVC (26 July 1860)
- 4th (Forest of Dean) Gloucestershire AVC (1 September 1861; attached to 1 August 1863; merged into 2 January 1864)
- 1st (Clevedon) Somerset AVC (18 June 1860)
- 2nd (Weston-super-Mare) Somerset AVC (30 July 1860; disbanded 1867)
- 2nd Gloucestershire Engineer Volunteer Corps (10 April 1861; attached from August 1862 until June 1864)

In 1863 a subscription by 'Bristol ladies' purchased two Whitworth 3-pounder guns.

Major Savile was appointed Lieutenant-Colonel of the administrative brigade on 28 November 1863. He was succeeded as Major Commandant of the 1st Gloucester AVC by Lord Glentworth, a former officer in the Rifle Brigade. Savile retired in 1873, becoming Honorary Colonel of the unit, when Brevet Colonel Arthur Blunt, formerly of the Bombay Artillery, became commanding officer (CO) of the brigade, and shortly afterwards of the 1st AVC as well.

The brigade was consolidated in March 1880 under the command of Lt-Col Adolphus H. Versturme, formerly of the 59th Foot, as:

1st Gloucestershire (Gloucester and Somerset) AVC

- HQ at Bristol
- Nos 1–6 Batteries at Bristol
- No 7 Battery at Newnham
- No 8 Battery at Gloucester
- No 9 Battery at Clevedon

Further batteries were added in following years: No 10 at Portishead, No 11 at Weston-Super-Mare, No 12 at Clevedon and No 13 at Bedminster. A Cadet Corps with HQ at Bristol also existed from 1880 to 1884. The 1st Gloucester AVC was assigned to the Welsh Division of the Royal Artillery (RA) on 1 April 1882, changing to the Western Division on 1 July 1889. By 1893 the War Office Mobilisation Scheme had allocated the 1st Gloucestershire Artillery Volunteers to the Plymouth fixed defences.

Frederick Cusac Ord, a former captain in the Royal Artillery, was appointed Major on 25 April 1885, became Lt-Col commanding on 7 December 1889 and Lt-Col Commandant on 1 April 1891. Lieutenant-Colonel Sir Edmund Elton, 8th Baronet, commissioned as Captain on 24 September 1881, became Major on 19 August 1893.

In 1899, the artillery volunteers were assigned to the Royal Garrison Artillery (RGA) and when the divisional organisation was abolished the unit was as 1st Gloucestershire (Gloucester and Somerset) RGA (Volunteers) on 1 January 1902.

== Territorial Force ==
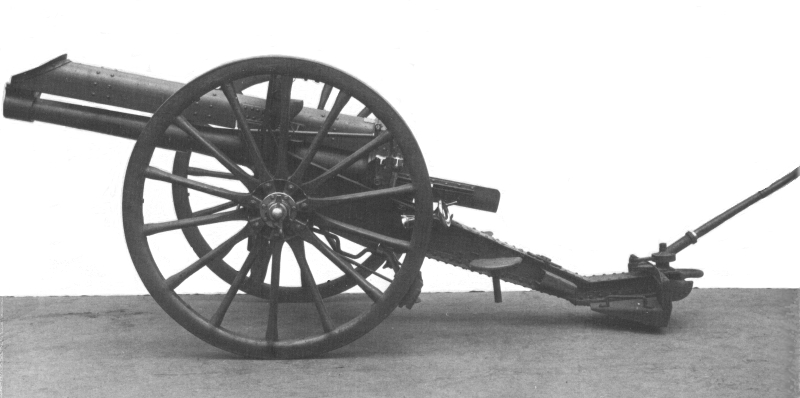
15-pounder gun.

When the Volunteers were subsumed into the new Territorial Force (TF) under the Haldane Reforms of 1908, the unit was to become the II (or 2nd) South Midland (Gloucestershire) Brigade, Royal Field Artillery (RFA), but this was changed in 1910 to I (or 1st) South Midland (Gloucestershire) Brigade, RFA. It formed part of the South Midland Division of the TF, with the following organisation (each battery consisted of four 15-pounder guns):

- HQ: Artillery Grounds, Clifton
- 1st Gloucestershire Battery, Clifton
- 2nd Gloucestershire Battery, Clifton
- 3rd Gloucestershire Battery, Barracks, Gloucester
- 1st South Midland Ammunition Column, Clifton

== First World War ==
=== Mobilisation ===
On the outbreak of war, I SM Bde mobilised at Clifton and Gloucester under Lt-Col A.M. Balfour, a retired Regular officer who had been in command since 7 December 1909. Initially went to its war station in the defences of the Naval base at Plymouth. It then joined the concentration of the South Midland Division around Chelmsford, where it formed part of Central Force. On the outbreak of war, units of the TF were invited to volunteer for Overseas Service. On 15 August 1914, the War Office issued instructions to separate those men who had signed up for Home Service only, and form these into reserve units. On 31 August, the formation of a reserve or 2nd Line unit was authorised for each 1st Line unit where 60 per cent or more of the men had volunteered for Overseas Service. The titles of these 2nd Line units would be the same as the original, but distinguished by a '2/' prefix. In this way duplicate battalions, brigades and divisions were created, mirroring those TF formations being sent overseas.

=== 1/I South Midland Brigade ===
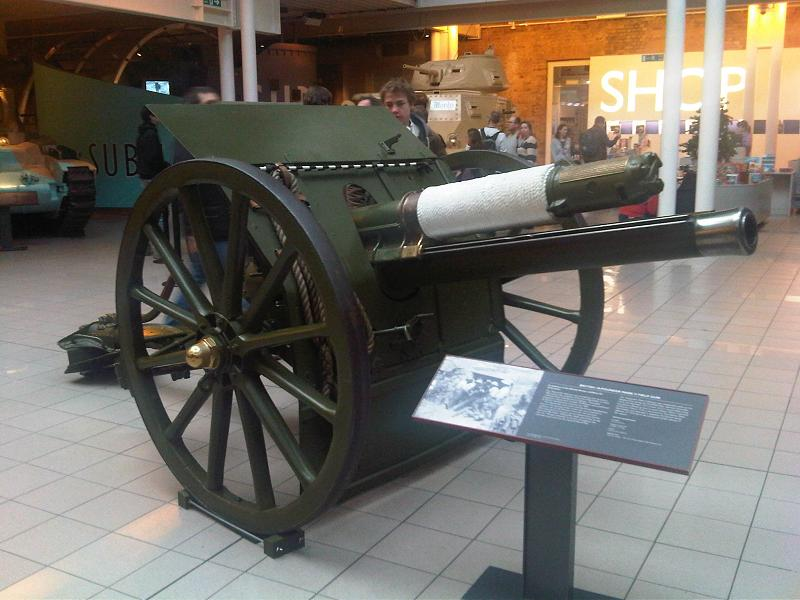
18-pounder gun preserved at the Imperial War Museum.

1/I South Midland Bde was stationed at Broomfield, near Chelmsford. The training of 1st South Midland Division proceeded satisfactorily, and it was selected for service on the Western Front. Orders arrived on 13 March 1915, final stores and reinforcements from 2/I SM Bde arrived, and 1/I SM Bde entrained on 29 March for Southampton, where it embarked on the transports City of Lucknow and Huanchaco, landing at Le Havre on 30 March. By 2 April, the brigade reached Neuve Eglise in Belgium where the division had concentrated. The batteries took up positions assigned to them by XXVII Bde of 5th Division, and began registering their guns on 5 April, despite problems with the fuzes of their old 15-pdr ammunition. Lieutenant-Col Balfour of 1/I SM Bde took over tactical control of the sector from XXVII Bde at midnight on 7/8 April. The brigade could do little, being allowed only three rounds per gun per day at first. Most of the firing was retaliatory exchanges with identified German batteries or to harass enemy working parties.

On 12 May, the division was designated the 48th (South Midland) Division. On 26 June, 1/I SM Bde was relieved by a Canadian brigade and went back to billets in Outtersteene, near Bailleul., and later to Ferfay It now formed part of a brigade group with 144th (Gloucester & Worcester) Brigade. After training, 1/I South Midland Bde went by train to Thièvres where on 21 July it was re-equipped with modern 18-pounder guns. It then went back into the line and on 31 July took over gun positions from the French at Colincamps in the Somme sector, where 48th (SM) Division joined a new Third Army.

During August, 1/I SM Bde also had 1/3rd Worcester and 1/1st and 1/2nd Warwickshire Btys from 48th (SM) Divisional Artillery (DA) under its command, forming an artillery group under 144th Bde. It carried out some good shooting for the infantry with the new 18-pdrs. The ammunition limit was now 188 rounds per brigade per week. Some of the gun positions were frequently under water, and some were moved to obtain enfilade fire against enemy trenches. Brigade HQ was in Hébuterne, where the gunners were billeted when they were not in the line. The village was often shelled, when the batteries would retaliate on the Germans in Puisieux; they also carried out barbed wire-cutting. This quiet routine continued into the new year, the guns remaining in position while the infantry brigades were regularly rotated out of the line for rest. 1/I South Midland Bde formed an additional battery, D Bty, at Thièvres on 29 March, including a fresh draft of men from the UK. On 31 March batteries of the newly-arrived 31st Division began taking over 1/I SM Bde's guns and positions, and on 6 April the brigade moved a short distance to Sailly, with two batteries in position in front of Serre.

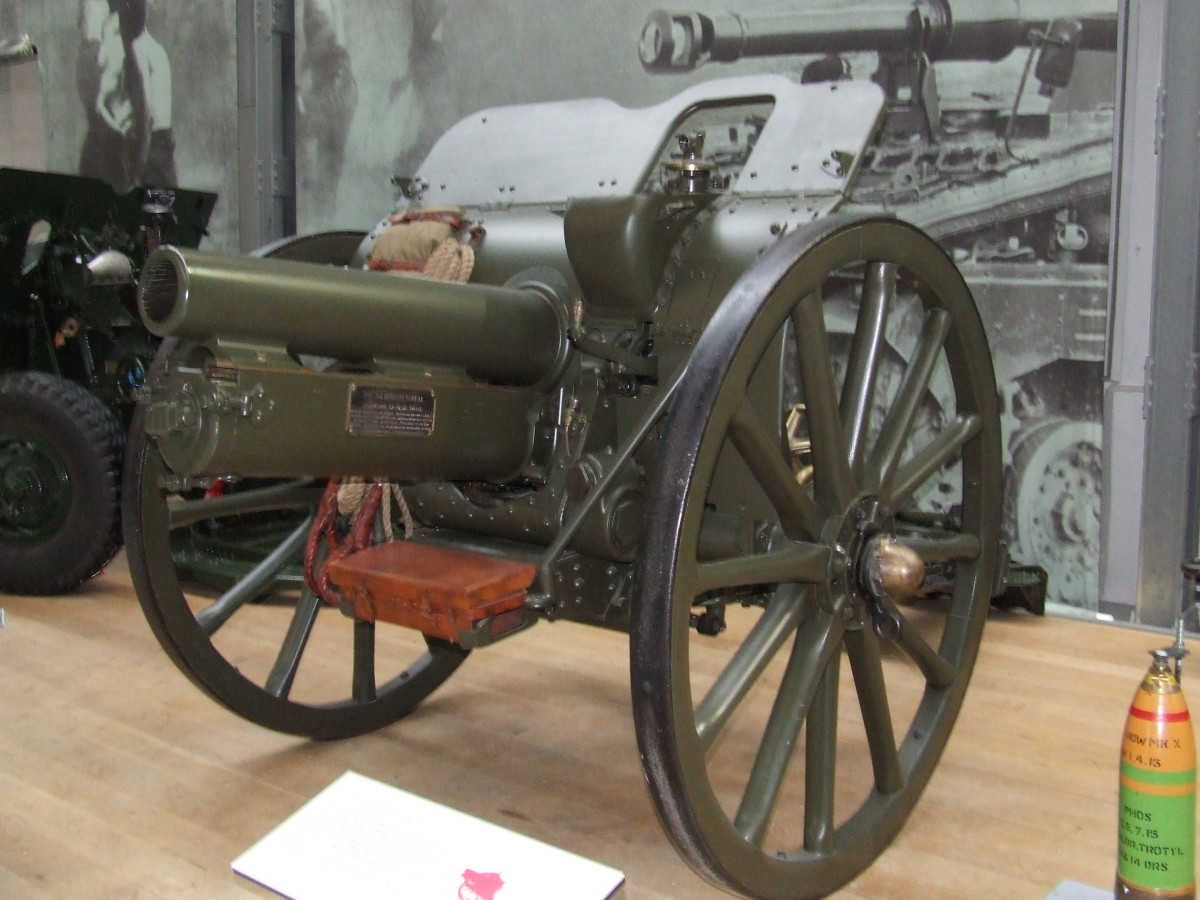
4.5-inch howitzer at the Royal Artillery Museum.

On 22 April Lt-Col Balfour left the brigade and Lt-Col Lord Wynford took over command on 9 May. On 18 May the brigade was redesignated CCXL (or 240th) Brigade (Note: The brigade continued to refer to itself as '240th (SM) Brigade', and is referred to in the RA history as '241st (Gloucester) Brigade'.) and the old 1/1st–1/3rd Gloucester batteries became A, B and C Btys. At the same time, the recently formed D Bty was transferred to CCXLIII (IV SM) Bde in exchange for 1/4th Warwickshire Howitzer Bty, equipped with four 4.5-inch howitzers, which became D (H) Bty. The Brigade Ammunition Column (BAC) was also abolished and merged into the Divisional Ammunition Column (DA).

==== Somme ====
After a long period of low-level Trench warfare, 48th (SM) Division's first offensive operation was in the Battle of the Somme. Both sides' artillery became more active and there were regular trench raids: A Bty was lent to 31st Division to support one raid on the night of 3/4 June. The following night CCXL (SM) Bde was relieved by CCXLIII (SM) Bde – the first time the whole brigade had been out of the line since July 1915. It moved to Coigneux, inspected its guns, and carried out training while the brigade and battery staffs reconnoitred the new positions it was to take up for the coming offensive. A, C and D Btys went into their new positions on 15 June, and work went on to improve them and to dump the ammunition (1000 rounds per gun for 18-pdrs and 800 for 4.5s). The bombardment programme for the offensive was to be spread over five days, U, V, W, X and Y before the assault was launched on Z day. On U Day (24 June) A and B Btys began wire-cutting on the German 2nd and 3rd lines in front of Serre, while C Bty bombarded suspected observation posts (OPs) and machine gun positions and D (H) Bty shelled trench junctions and communication trenches. On W and X days, C and D Bty supported VIII Corps' heavy artillery in bombarding the German 3rd line trenches. On several days the weather was too bad for good air or ground observation and the programme was extended by two days (Y1 and Y2). The battle was launched on 1 July 1916. Most of 48th (SM) Division was in reserve, only two battalions being engaged, but the brigade fired until 12.00 in support of 31st Division's assault on Serre. Despite the successful wire-cutting, not enough OPs and MG posts had been destroyed and 31st Division's attack was a disaster: the survivors had made their way back to the British lines by the end of the day.

Orders for 48th (SM) Division to resume the attacks next day were cancelled, and over the following days the batteries ceased wire-cutting fire, concentrating on harassing enemy communications. CCXL (SM) Brigade now formed part of 'A' Group of 48th (SM) DA under CCXLII (SM) Bde. and moved back to Coigneux. It carried out an intense bombardment for a feint attack by 48th (SM) Division on 14 July before the Battle of Bazentin Ridge. 48th (SM) Divisional Artillery came under the command of 28th Division when that took over the line next day. Then on 21 July the gun detachments of CCXL (SM) Bde travelled by bus to Aveluy to take over the guns of 12th (Eastern) Division in action there. The wagon lines were established at Bouzincourt with Brigade HQ in Aveluy Wood commanding North Group of 48th (SM) DA. This comprised C Bty and half of B Bty as a six-gun battery, together with D (H) Bty and the whole of CCXLIII (SM) Bde; A Bty and the other half of B Bty were with South Group. At 20.30 on 23 July the guns began a four-hour bombardment, after which 48th (SM) Division put in an attack at 00.30 as part of the Battle of Pozières Ridge. The infantry of 144th Bde were mown down, but 145th (South Midland) Bde was more successful and at 06.30 it renewed its attack. Moving forward close under 'an excellent barrage', the stormers were in among the surprised Germans as soon as it lifted, and were able to secure the Ovillers–Pozières light railway and adjacent trenches.

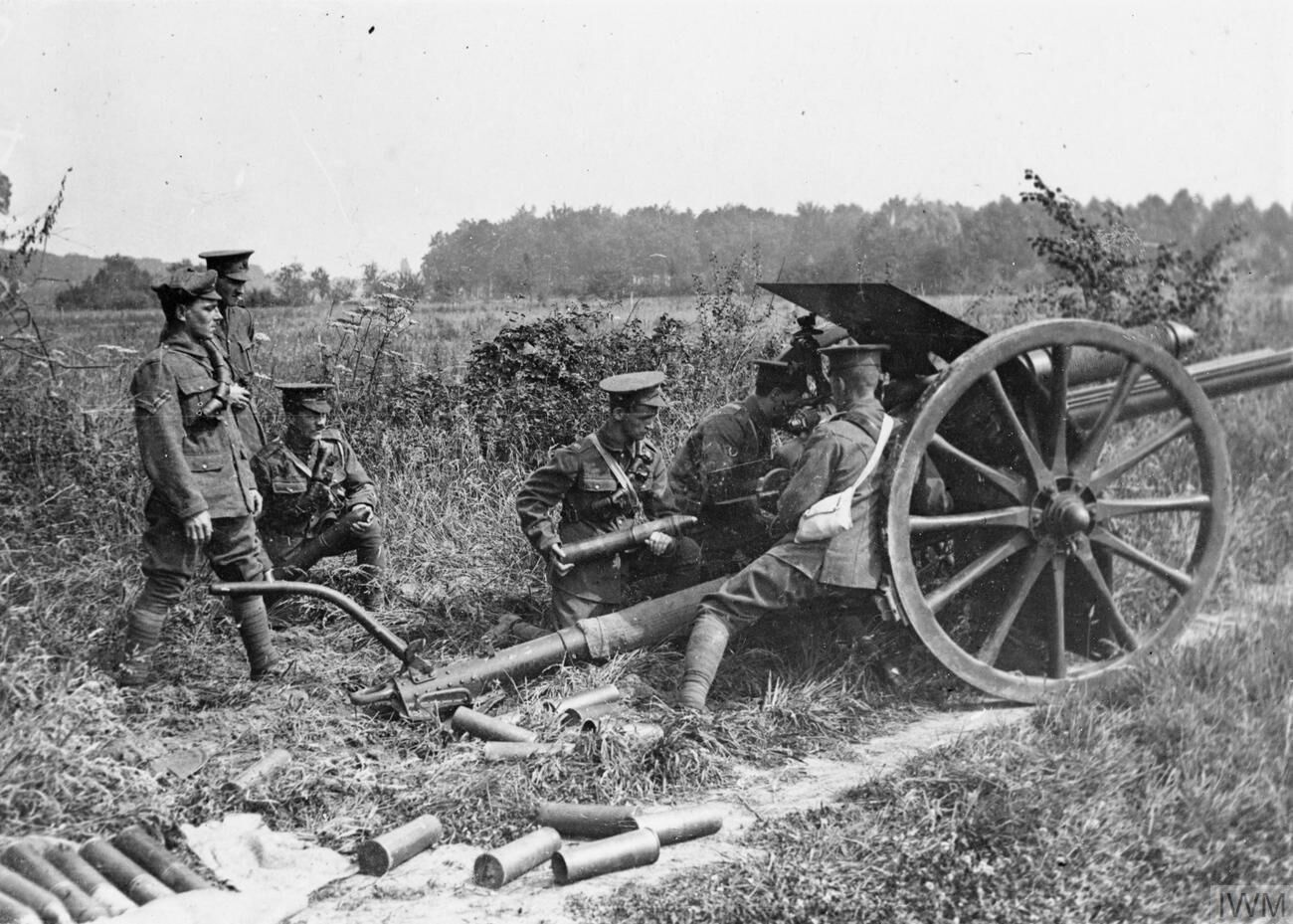
18-pounder in action on the Somme.

Afterwards, Pozières and the battery positions came under German shellfire, including Tear gas. During 26 and 27 July A and B Btys took up forward positions in 'Mash Valley' near Ovillers, but the following night the brigade was relieved by 12th (E) DA and marched to rest at St Ouen. It returned to Bouzincourt and took over the guns at Ovillers from 12th (E) DA again on 13 August. A Bty and half B Bty were in Right Group under CCXLII (SM) Bde, while the rest of CCXL (SM) Bde was in Left Group under CCXLIII (SM) Bde. 48th (SM) Division was involved in continuous fighting over 'Skyline Trench'. C and half of B Bty loaned their guns to 25th Divisional Artillery, the gunners remaining in place to dig fresh emplacements until additional guns arrived on 22 August. Meanwhile, D Bty fired 500 rounds of experimental Thermite shells. On 21 August, 48th (SM) and 25th Division attacked the Leipzig Salient behind an 'excellent barrage'. A follow-up attack by 7th Bde of 25th Division on 24 August, covered by 'Right Group' succeeded in capturing 'Hindenburg Trench' across the rear of the Leipzig Salient 'in fine style'.

While 48th (SM) Division was ordered to move north of the River Ancre, its divisional artillery came under 49th (West Riding) Division. Lieutenant-Col Lord Wynford and HQ of CCXL (SM) Bde took over command of the Howitzer Group, consisting of all three howitzer batteries of 48th (SM) DA and D (H)/CCXLVI Bty of 49th (WR) DA. The howitzers registered enemy trenches north of Thiepval and 49th (WR) Division's attack on 3 September succeeded in capturing 'Fabeck Graben'. The guns continued firing on their barrage lines until 6 September when CCXL (SM) Bde was withdrawn to Bouzinecourt leaving their guns in position. They returned to the line on 13 September and next day a combined group of CCXL and CCXLIII (SM) Bdes supported 32nd Bde of 11th (Northern) Division, which captured the 'Wonder Work'. Early on 15 September, the whole brigade came out of action, ready to move at 2 hours' notice to follow up that day's attack (the Battle of Flers–Courcelette). It moved up to open positions and at 18.20 opened fire in support of the Canadian Corps, which captured the village of Courcelette in the evening. As the battle continued over successive days, 48th (SM) DA was used as corps artillery to 'thicken' barrages for the attacks. On 19 September, a German shell fell in brigade HQ, killing and wounding a number of officers, and HQ was moved back to 'Usna Redoubt'. The Battle of Thiepval Ridge was launched on 26 September, and the batteries fired in support of the attacks on 'Zollern Trench', 'Stuff Redoubt', 'Schwaben Redoubt', and 'Hessian Trench'. The brigade's batteries were relieved by 25th DA on the night of 29/30 September.

The brigade went to quieter positions at Souastre, where it spent a few weeks carrying out registration and wire cutting shoots. On 18 October, 48th (SM) DA was reorganised, with CCXLIII Bde being broken up to bring the rest of the 18-pdr batteries up to a strength of six guns each. The brigade's former D Bty (now A/CCXLIII) returned and was split between A and B Btys, while half of C/CCXLIII Bty joined C Bty.

==== Winter 1916–17 ====
The divisional sector continued largely quiet, though on 9 November A Bty was very heavily shelled, with one gun being destroyed. On 13 November, the brigade fired to protect the flank of Fifth Army's attack on Beaumont-Hamel (the Battle of the Ancre). On 17 November, 48th (SM) DA was attached to 46th (North Midland) Division for which the brigade became Right Group. On 20 November 147th (2nd West Riding) Bde of 49th (WR) Division carried out a raid on Gommecourt, for which the brigade fired a protective barrage. On 27 November, 48th (SM) DA was relieved by 49th (WR) DA, and went back to Pas, where it took over the 49th's guns, moved to Frohen-le-Grand and then on to Béhencourt by 3 December. Brigade HQ was established at Bazentin-le-Petit Cemetery. CCXL (SM) Brigade remained in the one when 48th (SM) Division was relieved by 15th (Scottish) Division, and combined with LXXII Bde to form South Group for 15th (S) DA. On 30 and 31 December, CCXLI (SM) Bde's gunners relieved CCXL Bde at their guns.

D (H) Battery was brought up to a strength of six howitzers when half of C (H)/CCXLII (SM) Bty (originally 513 (H) Bty) joined on 16 January 1917. Thereafter, CCXL Bde had the following organisation:

- A Bty + half A/CCXLIII (ex D Bty, see above)
- B Bty + half A/CCXLIII
- C Bty + half C/CCXLIII
- D (H) Bty + half C (H)/CCXLII

CCXL (SM) Brigade was engaged in training during the first days of 1917, then on 13–14 January it relieved CCXLII (SM) Bde (which was leaving the division to become and Army Field Brigade) in the line west of Martinpuich, with brigade HQ at Contalmaison Villa. Although the sector was quiet, the guns continued exchanging fire with enemy batteries and suffered some damage. On 20–21 January, the brigade was relieved and sending some of its guns for overhaul it went to Bayencourt. At the end of the beginning of February, the brigade moved to Flaucourt and took over positions from the French in front of Péronne. On the night of 16/17 March, 144th Bde raided the enemy lines and found them empty: the Germans had begun withdrawing to the Hindenburg Line (Operation Alberich). On 18 March, 48th (SM) Division liberated Péronne. CCXL (SM) Brigade began moving up on 21 March, C and D (H) Btys crossing the River Somme with the division's mobile force, the rest of the brigade preparing to advance at short notice. On 25 March, D (H) Bty assisted the cavalry in clearing Tincourt Wood, and next day C and D (H) Btys cooperated with 1/4th Oxfordshire and Buckinghamshire Light Infantry and the Indian Cavalry in the capture of Roisel. On 27 March, they worked with cavalry and horse artillery to take Villers-Faucon. The brigade concentrated at Tincourt, and sent forward single guns to cooperate with the infantry against Hindenburg Line outposts round Sainte-Emilie. On 1 April, the brigade fired in support of the division's attack on Épehy, continuing against Ronssoy on 2–5 April. Brigade HQ was established at Ste-Emilie, with two batteries of CCXI Bde (newly arrived from Egypt with 42nd (East Lancashire) Division) under its command. Skirmishes against the German outposts continued for some weeks and the guns were edged forwards to bring the Hindenburg Line into range. At the end of the month, CCXL (SM) Bde was relieved by CCXI Bde and withdrew to Marquaix. Its batteries reinforced 42nd (EL) Division Artillery during 8–15 May, then received orders to move north to Beaulencourt, deploying around Beaumetz. Here, it supported trench raids and gas attacks, and bombardments by 44th (South African) Heavy Artillery Group, all directed against the 'Spoil Heap'. On 24 June, the brigade was sent for rest at Montauban.

==== Ypres ====
In July, 48th (SM) Division was sent north to rejoin Fifth Army for the forthcoming Third Ypres Offensive. It was in reserve when the offensive opened on 31 July, but took part in the Battle of Langemarck (16 August). Although this attack was disastrous overall, the artillery support for 48th (SM) Division was good and it captured some ground before being held up by a group of fortified farms. On 20 August the division took advantage of a spell of dry weather to attack the troublesome strongpoints that had held them up: 'Hillock Farm', 'Maison du Hibou', 'Triangle Farm' and 'The Cockcroft'. Seven tanks moved up the firm St Julien–Poelcapelle road covered by a smoke and shrapnel barrage, with a High Explosive (HE) barrage ahead, and subdued the strongpoints that were then captured by infantry platoons. A repeat of this attack two days later was less successful.

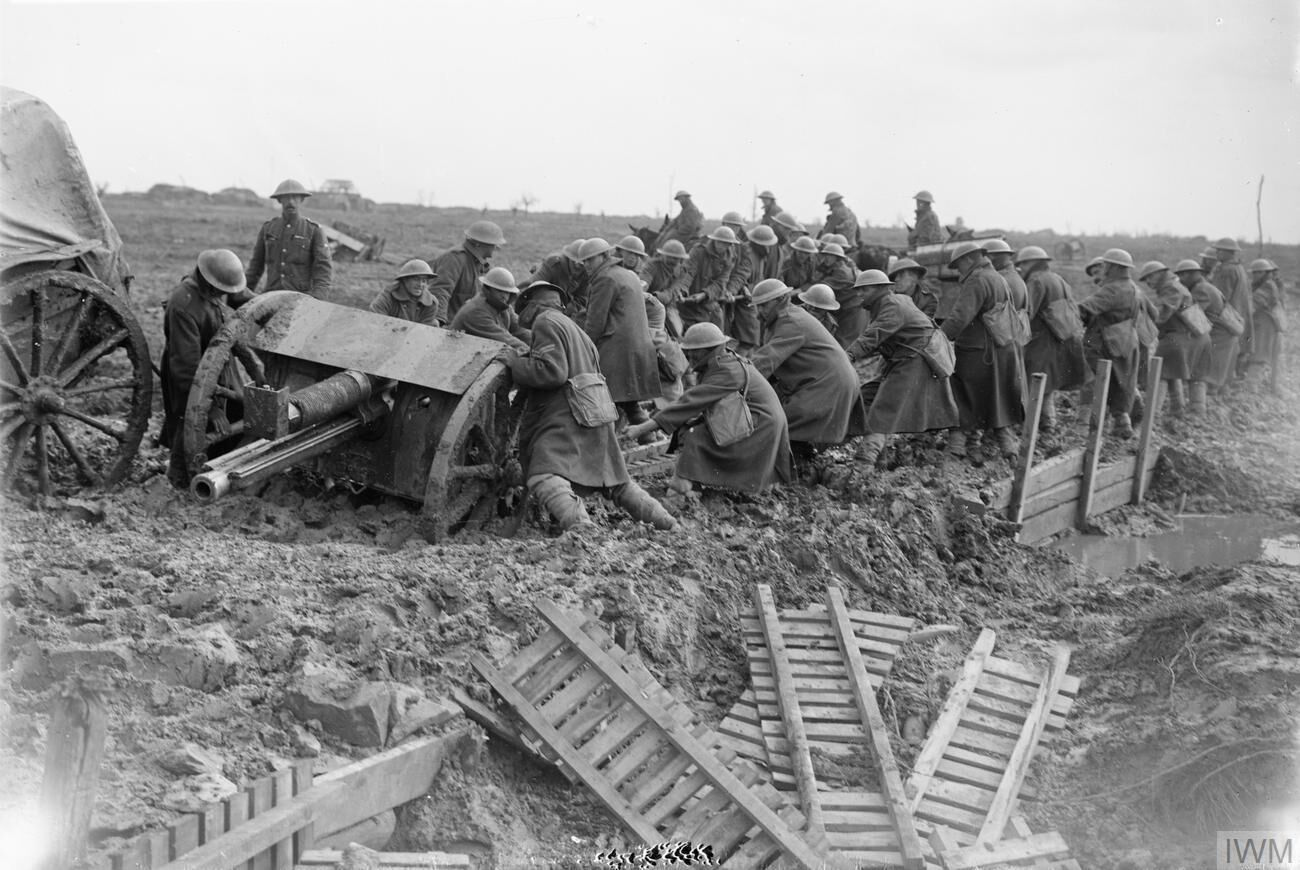
18-pounder being hauled out of mud at Langemarck, October 1917.

The division was back in action at the Battle of Broodseinde (4 October), with one infantry brigade attacking, but CCXL (SM) Bde (now commanded by Lt-Col C.M.C. Rudkin) remained in reserve. Next day it moved up and on 6 October the men went forward by lorry to relieve L Bde of 9th (Scottish) Division at their guns. Rudkin took command of No 3 Sub-Group (CCXL and CCXLI (SM) Bdes) from an HQ established in the ramparts of Ypres. The attack of 9 October (the Battle of Poelcappelle) was partially successful and the brigade moved forward to the outskirts of Ypres, with the Group HQ at Hussar Farm. On 12 October, it supported a dawn attack by other formations in the First Battle of Passchendaele and had the horse teams waiting in case of an advance. But the ground conditions were terrible, and many batteries were bogged down, so the preparatory barrage was feeble, many of the HE shellbursts being deadened by the mud. Casualties among the gunners were also severe because they were exposed to German observers on the ridge. The attack was a failure and CCXL (SM) Bde was relieved next day and moved to the Vimy area.

==== Italy ====
On 10 November, 48th Division was ordered to move to the Italian Front. Entrainment began on 21 November and by 1 December the division was concentrated round Legnago in the Adige Sector. On 1 March 1918, the division relieved 7th Division in the front line of the Montello sector on the Piave Front, and held the line until 16 March. On 1 April, it moved westward into reserve for the middle sector of the Asiago Plateau Front. It remained in Italy for the remainder of the war, taking part in the following operations:

On 10 November 1917, the 48th (SM) Division received orders to move to the Italian Front. By 1 December, the units had finished detraining around Legnago on the Adige. On 1 March 1918, the division relieved 7th Division in the front line of the Montello sector on the Piave Front, and held the line until 16 March, through 48th (SM) DA remained in the line until 21/22 March, rejoining the division on 24 March. On 1 April, the division moved westward into reserve for the middle sector of the Asiago Plateau Front.

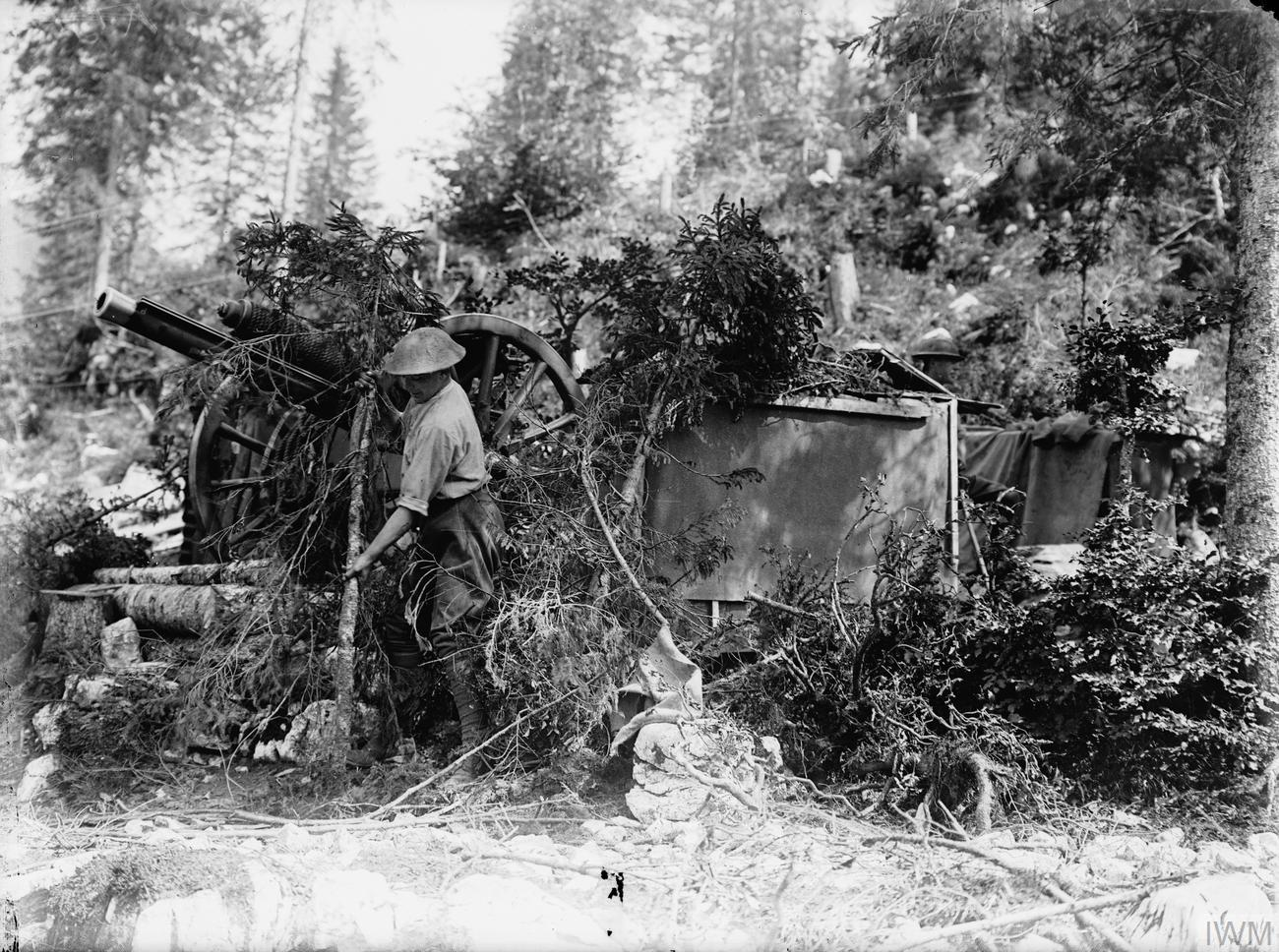
A camouflaged 18-pdr in Italy in 1918.

Later in April, 48th (SM) Division began tours of duty on the Asiago plateau, where the guns were manhandled into positions on steep slopes and hidden among trees. The flat-trajectory 18-pdrs had to have lanes cut through the trees to allow them to fire. The division was holding the front line on 15 June when the Austro-Hungarian Army launched its last offensive (the Second Battle of the Piave River). The division was wakened by the effects of the Spanish flu epidemic, but the artillery began their counter-preparation barrage at 03.30 in response to the wild Austrian bombardment, and shortened the range at 05.00 after their own infantry outposts had withdrawn. Thick mist hampered the defensive fire all day and telephone lines were cut by fire, so the batteries had to rely on runners and cyclists for communications, and on their own initiative. Because of the terrain there was little depth to the British positions – A and D (H) Btys of CCXL (SM) Bde were only 100 yards (91 m) behind the front line – and Austrian infantry penetrated 48th (SM) Division's line at several points. Two companies of 1/5th Gloucestershire Regiment were forced back to the Cesuna Switch Line, where they found a company of 1/5th Royal Warwickshire Regiment supported by two guns of D (H)/CCXL Bty. The infantry helped the gunners drag out the howitzers so they could fire over open sights, which checked the Austrian advance. This position was then enfiladed by a machine gun and the gunners began to suffer casualties. This machine gun was knocked out by a single 18-pdr of 12th Bty, XXXV Bde, RFA (7th Division), which had been manhandled forward through the woods to cover the open ground round Cesuna. By now A Bty had been overrun in hand-to-hand fighting and D (H) Bty had run out of ammunition, but Maj Corson and his men joined 12th Bty. The Austrians advanced once more, but two guns of 12th Bty (one manned by officers of D (H)/CCXL) and the rifles of the gunners destroyed them. 48th (SM) Division's infantry began counter-attacking that afternoon, and the following morning regained the lost ground.

48th (SM) Division remained in the Asiago sector throughout the summer and early autumn, carrying out a few minor operations. When the Allies forced the Piave line in later October (the Battle of Vittorio Veneto) the forces on the Asiago conformed when the Austrians withdrew. 48th (SM) Division began advancing into the Val d'Assa on 1 November, meeting some stiff resistance before the advance turned into a pursuit, with field gun sections accompanying the infantry brigade groups (there was not sufficient transport to support more than half the guns). On 3 November 1918, at Osteria del Termine, the division surrounded and captured a large force of Austrian troops including the corps commander and three divisional commanders. By 15.00 on 4 November, when the Armistice with Austria came into force, the division had pushed forward into the Trentino.

After the conclusion of hostilities, 48th (SM) Division was withdrawn to Italy for the winter. Demobilisation began in 1919 and was complete by 31 March. A composite infantry brigade was kept in Italy a little longer, accompanied by a reformed CII Bde RFA, one battery of which was supplied by CCXL (SM) Bde (made up from gunners who had joined from 1916 onwards, with a few volunteers).

=== 2/I South Midland Brigade ===
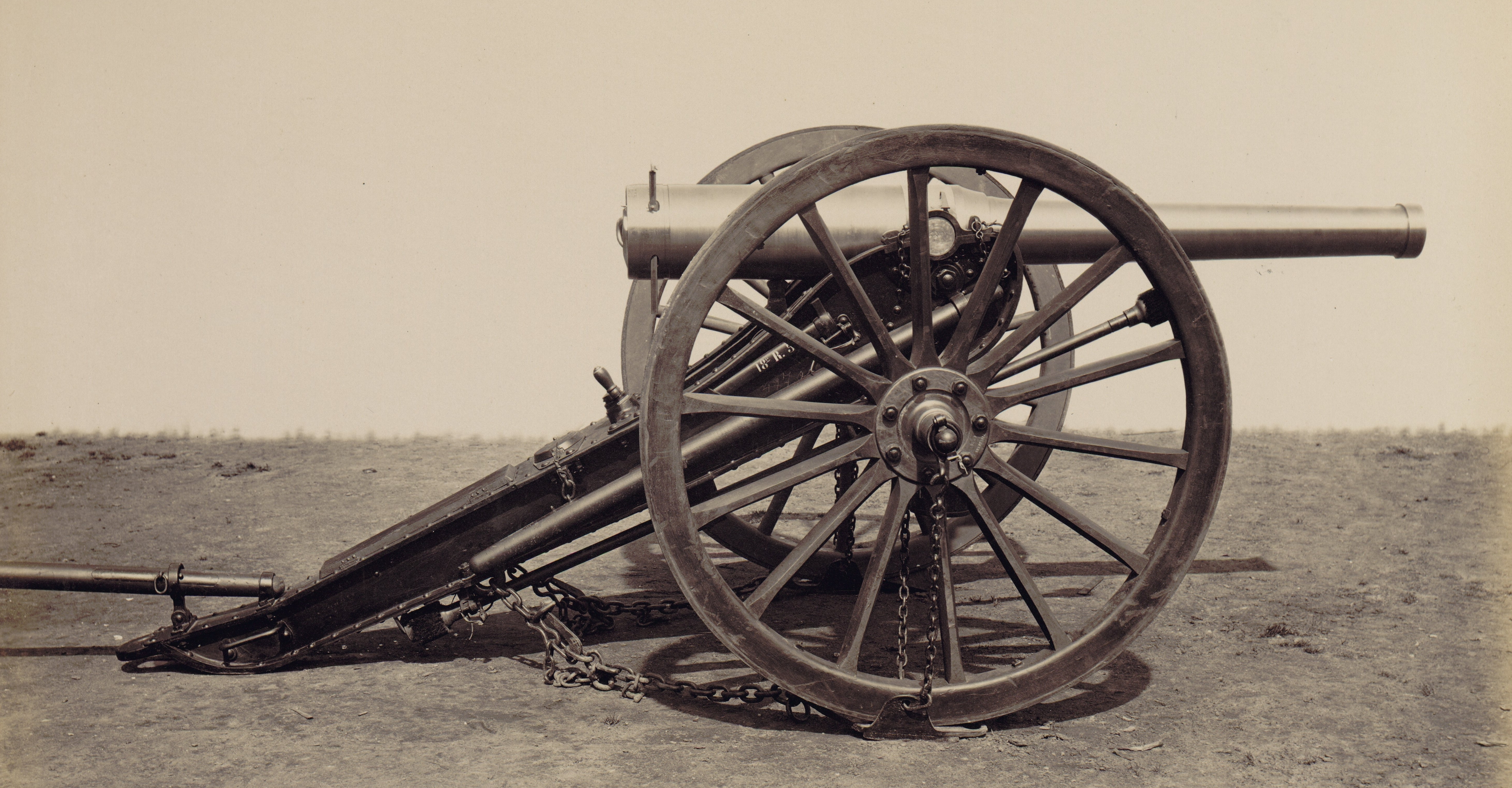
De Bange 90 mm French field gun issued to 2nd Line batteries.

The 2nd Line brigade was formed in the autumn of 1914, (Note: It referred to itself as 2/1st South Midland (Gloucester) Bde.) commanded by Lt-Col F.K.S. Metford, formerly of 3rd Gloucestershire Bty, and in January 1915 it joined the 2nd South Midland Division (later 61st (2nd South Midland) Division) at Northampton. Equipment was scarce, and until the end of 1915 the only guns available for training were obsolete French De Bange 90 mm guns. While stationed at Northampton, the division formed part of First Army of Central Force, but once the 48th Division had gone to France, the 61st replaced it around Chelmsford as part of Third Army, Central Force, responsible for coastal defence. 2/I SM Brigade replaced its 1st Line at Broomfield, and was then housed in huts at Writtle, where it carried out intensive training in Hylands Park. In July the remaining Home Service men were transferred to a Provisional (Home Defence) unit and replaced by men from the 3rd Line, so that the whole brigade was composed of men available for overseas service. At the end of the month, the brigade went under canvas at Thornwood Camp, Epping until September, when it moved to Ingatestone. In December, the brigade received its new 18-pdr guns and in mid-February 1916 carried out firing practice at Southminster. At the end of the month, it moved to No 7 Camp at Bulford for final battle training on Salisbury Plain, with firing on the West Down Ranges at Larkhill. On 16/17 May 1916, 2/I (SM) brigade was redesignated CCCV Brigade RFA (305 Bde), (Note: 61st (2nd SM) Division's own order of battle document refers to it as '305th (SM) Brigade'.), the batteries were redesignated A, B and C, and the BAC was absorbed into 61st (SM) DAC.

The brigade entrained at Amesbury on 22 May and embarked that afternoon at Southampton Docks aboard SS Hunslet, landing at Le Havre next day. It then went by train to Merville, being billeted near Haverskerque on 25 May. 61st (2nd SM) Division completed its concentration on 28 May the whole division was in France, concentrated in IX Corps' area behind the front line. As part of their familiarisation, Lt-Col Metford and his officers visited No 10 Squadron, Royal Flying Corps and 39th Divisional Artillery to learn about up-to-date air observation and artillery techniques. On 12 June, the brigade's three batteries moved into the firing line, forming part of 61st (2nd SM) DA's Right Group. On 19 June, Lt-Col H.A. Koebel (a Regular officer) took over command of the brigade and Lt-Col Metford returned to England.

The bombardment for that summer's 'Big Push' (the Battle of the Somme) began on 24 June, and 61st (2nd SM) DA joined in, with CCCV Bde engaged in Counter-battery fire. The division's own first action was the Attack at Fromelles on 19 July 1916, a diversionary operation in support of the Somme Offensive. Artillery preparation began on 18 July but failed to suppress the enemy artillery. A dugout at B Battery's OP was destroyed by shellfire and the battery commander, Maj G.P. Lindrea, was killed. The infantry attack was a disaster, the assaulting battalions taking very heavy casualties. 61st (2nd SM) Division was so badly mauled that it was not used offensively again in 1916.

On 16/17 September, CCCV (2/I SM) Brigade was broken up among the other artillery brigades of 61st (2nd SM) DA to bring them up to 6-gun batteries. Lieutenant-Col Koebel went to command CCXLVII Bde

== Interwar Years ==
When the TF was reconstituted on 7 February 1920, the 1st South Midland Bde reformed with 1st–3rd Gloucestershire Batteries, joined by the former Berkshire Royal Horse Artillery at Reading as a fourth battery (the Berkshire Bty). The TF was reorganised as the Territorial Army (TA) in 1921 and the unit was redesignated as 66th (South Midland) Brigade, RFA. The brigade continued to form part of 48th (South Midland) Division. The title changed to 66th (South Midland) Field Brigade, RA, in January 1924 when the RFA was subsumed into the RA.

- HQ: Artillery Grounds, Clifton
- 261st (Bristol) Field Battery, Clifton
- 262nd (Bristol) Field Battery, Clifton
- 263rd (Bristol) Field Battery, Clifton
- 264th (Berkshire) Field Battery (Howitzers), Yeomanry House, Reading

The Clifton College contingent of the Officers' Training Corps (Junior Division) was attached to the unit in the 1930s.

=== Anti-Aircraft conversion ===
During the 1930s, the increasing need for anti-aircraft (AA) defence for Britain's cities was addressed by converting a number of existing TA units. The 66th (South Midland) Field Brigade was one of the units converted to the AA artillery role on 1 November 1938, becoming 76th (Gloucestershire) Anti-Aircraft Regiment, RA. 264 Battery at Reading was separated and expanded to form a new 80th (Berkshire) AA Rgt. The HQ and three remaining batteries (renumbered as 236, 237 and 238 (Bristol) AA Btys) were all based at the Artillery Grounds at Clifton. It formed part of 46th Anti-Aircraft Brigade in 5 AA Division, which provided the AA defence for Bristol, including Bristol Docks and the Bristol Aeroplane Company factory at Filton Aerodrome, a key target.

== Second World War ==
=== Mobilisation ===
The TA's AA units were mobilised on 23 September 1938 during the Munich Crisis, with units manning their emergency positions within 24 hours, even though many did not yet have their full complement of men or equipment. The emergency lasted three weeks, and they were stood down on 13 October. In February 1939, the existing AA defences came under the control of a new Anti-Aircraft Command. In June, a partial mobilisation of TA units was begun in a process known as 'couverture', whereby each AA unit did a month's tour of duty in rotation to man selected AA and searchlight positions. On 24 August, ahead of the declaration of war, AA Command was fully mobilised at its war stations, with the eight 3-inch guns of 76th AA Rgt deployed as planned in and around the Bristol Gun Defence Area (GDA) – four of them out of action.

On 11 September 1939, all the available heavy AA (HAA) guns in 46 AA Bde (76th AA Rgt's eight guns) were concentrated to cover Avonmouth Docks. These guns were relocated to Filton Aerodrome in October. In the near-total absence of light AA (LAA) guns, detachments from other units armed with Light machine guns were deployed during October to cover Vulnerable Points (VPs), such as airfields and aircraft factories. 76th AA Regiment manned 16 Lewis guns at Parnall Aircraft, Yate, until they were relieved by 68th (Monmouthshire Regiment) Searchlight Rgt in November.

From 1 June 1940, those AA units armed with 3-inch or the more modern 3.7-inch guns were termed 'Heavy AA' (HAA) to distinguish them for the Light AA units then being formed.

=== Battle of Britain and Blitz ===
8 AA Division formation sign.

By 11 July 1940, at the start of the Battle of Britain, 5 AA Division had 36 HAA guns deployed at Bristol. Some of the greatest air battles of the Battle of Britain were fought on 15 August, from South Wales to the Yorkshire Coast, when 5 AA Division was hotly engaged, being credited with several 'kills'. Another peak day came on 24 August, when the Bristol gunners were in action again. From 6 September the Luftwaffe switched from bombing airfields to bombing cities, and there was a daylight raid on Bristol on 25 September 1940.

As AA Command expanded, the regiment formed a new 349 HAA Bty formed on 17 September, and 46 AA Bde transferred to a new 8 AA Division in November. Now, the night attacks were stepped up against London and other cities, with Bristol receiving frequent raids, particularly heavy in March 1941 (the Bristol Blitz).

The regiment sent a cadre to 207th Training Regiment at Devizes to provide the basis for a new 425 HAA Bty; this was formed on 24 April 1941 and later joined 126th HAA Rgt. The regiment sent another cadre to 207th HAA Training Regiment to provide the basis for a new 480 (Mixed) HAA Bty, in which women of the Auxiliary Territorial Service were integrated. This battery was formed on 18 September 1941 but was converted to men-only on 15 October before being regimented with 76th HAA Rgt on 9 December. It replaced 238 HAA Bty, which left in October–November to join the field force under War Office control and later transferred to 83rd (Blythswood) AA Rgt. In the autumn of 1941, the regiment (with 236, 237 and 349 HAA Btys) joined a new 69 AA Bde in 8 AA Division.

=== Mobilising for overseas service ===
The regiment was now prepared for overseas service. This required a war establishment of three batteries, and 480 HAA Bty was reduced back to a cadre on 9 April 1942 to return to Devizes and form a new 480 (Mixed) Bty; this battery eventually joined 162nd HAA Rgt The rest of the regiment had left AA Command by May 1942. By September 1942, it had come under War Office Control, with its own Royal Corps of Signals Section and Royal Army Ordnance Corps Workshop Section. It was joined by a Royal Army Service Corps transport platoon in the autumn of 1942 and was now ready for overseas service as a mobile unit.

=== Tunisia ===
In October 1942, the advance parties of the regiment sailed for North Africa as part of Operation Torch, and began unloading their equipment in Algiers harbour soon after it was secured on 9 November. However, the HAA units had not been 'combat loaded' and it took some time to assemble the 3.7-inch guns, vehicles and equipment and deploy to engage the Luftwaffe air attacks that quickly developed against the port and nearby airfields. It was not until the end of the year that the regiment was at full strength; however, by mid-January 1943, it had a battery in action at Algiers port, and troops at Maison Blanche and Blida airfields, all under 62 AA Bde. These were regularly attacked by German bombers flying from Sicily and Sardinia. On one occasion, 13 Allied aircraft were destroyed and many damaged during a night raid on Maison Blanche. As the campaign developed and First Army advanced eastwards, the regiment had full batteries deployed in 'Inner Artillery Zones' (IAZs) at Algiers, Bougie and Djidjelli by mid-March. In these positions, the gunners found that the performance of their gun-laying (GL) radar sets was degraded by nearby hills and it was difficult to engage 'unseen' targets.

By late April, 62 AA Bde had been relieved round Algiers by US Army units, and was able to move up behind First Army. 76th HAA Regiment now joined 52 AA Bde, which consisted of a mobile AA force for the final push in Tunisia (Operation Vulcan). These units were ready to move into Tunis and Bizerta immediately behind the leading battle groups. Despite German counter-attacks, 'Vulcan' was launched on 6 May and in the afternoon of 7 May Allied troops entered the two cities and 52 AA Bde was called forward. In fact, enemy combat troops were still holding out, and at Bizerta the AA advance parties came under shellfire from outside the town. Once the last resistance had been flushed out, 76 HAA Rgt deployed in the Bizerta IAZ. Because of the port's vital importance for the assembly and despatch of forces for the Allied invasion of Sicily (Operation Husky) this became the largest British AA commitment in the theatre.

=== Sicily ===
The assault landings on Sicily began on 10 July 1943, Syracuse was entered that night, and 62 AA Bde HQ landed there on 17 July, bringing with it batteries from 76th HAA and other regiments, which were dispersed and deployed where required. The vital harbours at Syracuse and Augusta received constant raids from Luftwaffe bombers and fighters by day and night, with the AA gunners scoring several 'kills'. By D+28 (7 August), 76th HAA Rgt was deployed around Syracuse with 236 HAA Bty detached to Augusta.

=== Italy ===
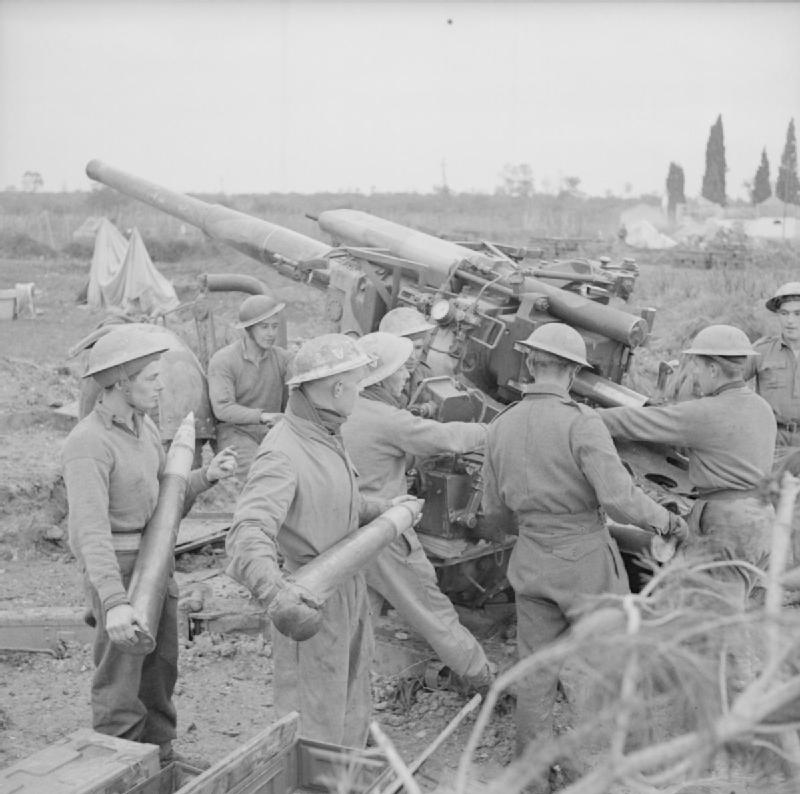
3.7-inch AA gun in action in the field artillery role in Italy

Messina fell on 17 August, completing the capture of Sicily, and the Allies moved quickly to the invasion of the Italian mainland, beginning with Eighth Army crossing the Straits of Messina on 3 September (Operation Baytown). 62 AA Brigade HQ followed on 29 September, taking 76 HAA Rgt with it. Travelling by road, it crossed Italy and reached Bari on 2 October, it relieved the AA units there to follow the advance and took over defence of Bari harbour, Barletta and Manfredonia on the coast, and a complex of inland airfields. The ports were important for Eighth Army's supplies, and were targeted by the Luftwaffe. On the night of 2/3 December, there was an Air raid on Bari covered by clouds of 'Window' (known as Düppel to the Luftwaffe). Not only were the Royal Air Force and Royal Artillery radar stations blinded, but communications broke down between the two services and defensive fire only began as the first bombs fell. The guns claimed three bombers shot down. The bombers had been aided by the port working under full lighting, and the damage to shipping and stores was increased by the explosion of an ammunition vessel.

Shortly after the Bari raid, 62 AA Bde HQ and 76 HAA Rgt were relieved and moved on up the eastern side of the Italian peninsula behind Eighth Army, crossing to join US Fifth Army in April 1944. Initially, it was involved in airfield defence; however, after Fifth Army's capture of Rome in June 1944, it deployed to defend the bridges over the Tiber and the port of Piombino. Then, when relieved, it was able to follow close behind Fifth Army. Although the Luftwaffe's losses meant the air threat was lowered, HAA batteries of 62 AA Bde also employed their versatile long-range 3.7-inch guns in a medium artillery role against ground targets. This included counter-battery (CB), defensive fire (DF) and harassing fire (HF) shoots, but also air-burst shoots against entrenched positions, and destruction of hard targets such as buildings.

Once Fifth Army had crossed the Arno, it faced the Serchio and the defences of the Gothic Line. On 26 December, the German forces put in a major counterattack, Unternehmen Wintergewitter (Operation Winter Storm), between Lucca and Pistoia aimed at retaking the port of Livorno (Leghorn). 62 AA Brigade was well to the front in the resulting Battle of Garfagnana, with LAA regiments acting as infantry and anti-tank gunners, while the HAA regiments acted as divisional medium artillery. 76th HAA Regiment answered 181 calls for fire with 4,995 rounds fired. Having beaten off the attack, IV US Corps advanced into the mountains. There was little activity by the Luftwaffe, so the ample stocks of 3.7-inch AA ammunition were used for all kinds of engagements. By the end of February 1945, 62 AA had been reduced to just two regiments – of which 76th was one – with only one battery on AA tasks.

Fifteenth Army Group (British Eighth and US Fifth Armies) launched its final offensive (Operation Grapeshot) on 6 April 1945 and the Italian Campaign ended shortly afterwards. 76th (Gloucester) Heavy Anti-Aircraft Regiment and its three batteries were placed in suspended animation on 24 November 1945.

== Post-war ==
When the TA was reconstituted on 1 January 1947, the regiment was reformed as 266 (Gloucestershire Volunteer Artillery) HAA Rgt, RA in 72 AA Bde (the former 46 AA Bde at Bristol). (On 1 April 1947, the Regular Army's 1st HAA Rgt took the GVA's old number and became 76 HAA Rgt.)

When AA Command was disbanded in 1955, there were wholesale mergers among its units. 266 HAA Regiment was amalgamated with 312 (Gloucestershire) and 601 (City of Bristol) HAA Rgts to form 'P' (Gloucestershire Volunteer Artillery) Battery in the new 311 (City of Bristol) HAA Rgt. In 1961, that regiment was merged into 883 (Bristol) Locating Battery to form 883 (Gloucestershire Volunteer Artillery) Locating Battery.

A further reorganisation in 1967 saw the battery converted to 'A' (Gloucestershire Volunteer Artillery) Squadron in the Royal Gloucestershire Hussars. This Regiment was reduced to a cadre at Bristol in 1969, but two years later 266 (Gloucestershire Volunteer Artillery) OP Battery was formed from the cadre as an independent Observation Post unit as a reinforcement unit for BAOR supplying observation post teams. In 1992, this re-roled as a field battery operating 105mm Light Guns, supporting 7 Para RHA, wearing the maroon beret from 1994. In 1999, 266 subsumed the London-based 289 Battery and joined 100th (Yeomanry) Regiment Royal Artillery with the battery supporting both 7 Para RHA and 29 Commando Regiment. The current Plymouth based 289 Commando Troop forms part of the current battery.

In 2013, when 100th Regiment RA went into suspended animation under Army 2020 plans, 266 Battery re-roled to operate Desert Hawk 3 Mini Unmanned Air Systems (M-UAS) and was re-designated to 104 Regiment Royal Artillery.

266 Battery re-roled back to L118 Light Gun in 2017 and currently operates in support of 3rd Deep Reconnaissance Strike Brigade, providing gun sections, FSTs, and Command Post personnel.

== Uniforms and insignia ==
The original officers' uniform of the 1st Gloucestershire AVC was a long-skirted blue tunic with scarlet cuffs, collar and edging, five rows of black braid across the front and black Austrian knots on the sleeves. Other ranks wore a blue tunic with black Austrian knots. A peaked forage cap was worn with a silver grenade on the front, with white waist and cross belts. A busby became the full dress headgear in the 1860s and was worn until 1908.

During the period 1908–19, the Gloucester TF batteries wore a brass shoulder title, 'T/RFA/GLOSTER', while the brigade ammunition column wore 'T/RFA/S.MIDLAND'. However, at some point the batteries wore a non-regulation embroidered shoulder title 'GLOS/RFA/T', in red on a dark blue backing.

From 1961 to 1967, 883 Locating Battery wore an embroidered title 'GLOUCESTERSHIRE/VOLUNTEER ARTILLERY' in red on dark blue. This remained in wear for A (GVA) Squadron, Royal Gloucestershire Hussars from 1967 to 1971. In 1971 the reformed 266 OP Battery introduced a black embroidered slip-on title 'G.V.A.' worn on the shoulder straps of the barrack jersey; other ranks wore the title in white metal.

== Honorary Colonels ==
The following officers served as Honorary Colonel of the unit:

- Col Henry Bourchier Osborne Savile, CB, VD, former CO, appointed 9 August 1873
- Col Frederick Cusac Ord, CB, VD, TD, former CO, appointed 8 December 1909
- Lt-Gen Sir Percy P. de B. Radcliffe, KCMG, CB, DSO, RA officer and former commander of 48th (SM) Division, appointed 24 April 1926
- Lt-Col Francis Killigrew Seymour Metford, CB, OBE, VD, TD, appointed 12 May 1934

== Bibliography ==
- Anderson, Tim (2013). The Bristol Gunners: The History of the Gloucestershire Volunteer Artillery. London: CreateSpace Independent Publishing Platform. ISBN 978-1-4936-6781-9.
- Maj A.F. Becke,History of the Great War: Order of Battle of Divisions, Part 2a: The Territorial Force Mounted Divisions and the 1st-Line Territorial Force Divisions (42–56), London: HM Stationery Office, 1935/Uckfield: Naval & Military Press, 2007, ISBN 978-1-84734-739-8.
- Maj A.F. Becke,History of the Great War: Order of Battle of Divisions, Part 2b: The 2nd-Line Territorial Force Divisions (57th–69th), with the Home-Service Divisions (71st–73rd) and 74th and 75th Divisions, London: HM Stationery Office, 1937/Uckfield: Naval & Military Press, 2007, ISBN 978-1-84734-739-8.
- Ian F.W. Beckett, Riflemen Form: A study of the Rifle Volunteer Movement 1859–1908, Aldershot: Ogilby Trusts, 1982, ISBN 978-0-85936-271-9.
- Bellis, Malcolm A. (1995). Regiments of the British Army 1939–1945 (Artillery). London: Military Press International. ISBN 978-0-85420-110-5.
- Brig-Gen Sir James E. Edmonds, History of the Great War: Military Operations, France and Belgium, 1916, Vol I, London: Macmillan,1932/Woking: Shearer, 1986, ISBN 0-946998-02-7/Uckfield: Naval & Military Press, 2021, ISBN 978-1-78331-615-1.
- Brig-Gen Sir James E. Edmonds, History of the Great War: Military Operations, France and Belgium 1917, Vol II, Messines and Third Ypres (Passchendaele), London: HM Stationery Office, 1948//Uckfield: Imperial War Museum and Naval and Military Press, 2009, ISBN 978-1-84574-723-7.
- Brig-Gen Sir James E. Edmonds & Maj-Gen H.R. Davies, History of the Great War: Military Operations, Italy 1915–1919, London: HM Stationery Office, 1949/Imperial War Museum, 1992, ISBN 978-0-901627742/Uckfield: Naval and Military Press, 2011, ISBN 978-1-84574-945-3.
- Capt Cyril Falls, History of the Great War: Military Operations, France and Belgium 1917, Vol I, The German Retreat to the Hindenburg Line and the Battle of Arras, London: Macmillan, 1940/London: Imperial War Museum & Battery Press/Uckfield: Naval and Military Press, 2009, ISBN 978-1-84574-722-0.
- Gen Sir Martin Farndale, History of the Royal Regiment of Artillery: Western Front 1914–18, Woolwich: Royal Artillery Institution, 1986, ISBN 978-1-870114-00-4.
- Gen Sir Martin Farndale, History of the Royal Regiment of Artillery: The Forgotten Fronts and the Home Base 1914–18, Woolwich: Royal Artillery Institution, 1988, ISBN 1-870114-05-1.
- Gen Sir Martin Farndale, History of the Royal Regiment of Artillery: The Years of Defeat: Europe and North Africa, 1939–1941, Woolwich: Royal Artillery Institution, 1988/London: Brasseys, 1996, ISBN 978-1-85753-080-3.
- J.B.M. Frederick, Lineage Book of British Land Forces 1660–1978, Vol II, Wakefield, Microform Academic, 1984, ISBN 1-85117-009-X.
- Gen Sir William Jackson, History of the Second World War, United Kingdom Military Series: The Mediterranean and Middle East, Vol VI: Victory in the Mediterranean, Part I|I: November 1944 to May 1945, London: HMSO, 1988/Uckfield, Naval & Military Press, 2004, ISBN 978-1-84574-072-6.
- Lt-Col H.F. Joslen, Orders of Battle, United Kingdom and Colonial Formations and Units in the Second World War, 1939–1945, London: HM Stationery Office, 1960/London: London Stamp Exchange, 1990, ISBN 0-948130-03-2/Uckfield: Naval & Military Press, 2003, ISBN 1-843424-74-6.
- Peter H. Liddle (ed), Passchendaele in Perspective: The Third Battle of Ypres, London: Leo Cooper, 1997, ISBN 978-0-85052-552-6.
- Norman Litchfield & Ray Westlake, The Volunteer Artillery 1859–1908 (Their Lineage, Uniforms and Badges), Nottingham: Sherwood Press, 1982, ISBN 978-0-9508205-0-7.
- Norman E.H. Litchfield, The Territorial Artillery 1908–1988 (Their Lineage, Uniforms and Badges), Nottingham: Sherwood Press, 1992, ISBN 978-0-9508205-2-1.
- Capt Wilfred Miles, History of the Great War: Military Operations, France and Belgium 1916, Vol II, 2nd July 1916 to the End of the Battles of the Somme, London: Macmillan, 1938/Imperial War Museum & Battery Press, 1992, ISBN 0-89839-169-5/Uckfield: Naval & Military Press, 2005, ISBN 978-1-84574-721-3.
- Brig C.J.C. Molony, History of the Second World War, United Kingdom Military Series: The Mediterranean and Middle East, Vol V: The Campaign in Sicily 1943 and the Campaign in Italy 3rd September 1943 to 31st March 1944, London: HMSO, 1973/Uckfield, Naval & Military Press, 2004, ISBN 978-1-84574-069-6.
- Maj-Gen I.S.O. Playfair & Brig C.J.C. Molony, History of the Second World War, United Kingdom Military Series: The Mediterranean and Middle East, Vol IV: The Destruction of the Axis forces in Africa, London: HMSO, 1966/Uckfield, Naval & Military Press, 2004, ISBN 978-1-84574-068-9
- Brig N.W. Routledge, History of the Royal Regiment of Artillery: Anti-Aircraft Artillery 1914–55, London: Royal Artillery Institution/Brassey's, 1994, ISBN 978-1-85753-099-5
- Edward M. Spiers, The Army and Society 1815–1914, London: Longmans, 1980, ISBN 978-0-582-48565-5.
- Titles and Designations of Formations and Units of the Territorial Army, London: War Office, 7 November 1927 (RA sections also summarised in Litchfield, Appendix IV).
- R.A. Westlake, Royal Engineers (Volunteers) 1859–1908, Wembley: R.A. Westlake, 1983, ISBN 978-0-9508530-0-0.
- Leon Wolff, In Flanders Fields: The 1917 Campaign, London: Longmans, 1959/Corgi, 1966.

=== External links ===
- The Bristol Gunners Archived 3 February 2018 at the Wayback Machine
- British Army units from 1945 on
- British Military History
- The Long, Long Trail
- Orders of Battle at Patriot Files Archived 26 March 2023 at the Wayback Machine
- The Regimental Warpath 1914–1918
- Land Forces of Britain, the Empire and Commonwealth (Regiments.org) – archive site
- Royal Artillery 1939–1945
