= Middlesex Yeomanry =

Former British volunteer cavalry regiment

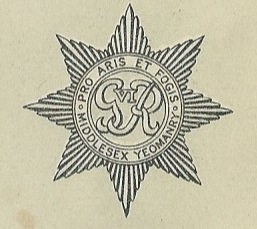
- Middlesex Yeomanry badge (reign of King George VI)
- Active: 1797–1802; 1830–present
- Country: Kingdom of Great Britain (1797–1800); United Kingdom (1801–present)
- Branch: British Army
- Size: 3 Regiments (First World War); 2 Signal units (Second World War); Squadron (current)
- Mottos: "Pro Aris et Focis" (For Hearth and Home; literally For Altars and Hearths)
- Anniversaries: Lafone Day (27 October)
- Engagements: Second Boer War: Senekal; Groenkop; First World War: Scimitar Hill; Buqqar Ridge; Afula and Besian; Capture of Damascus; Second World War: Fallujah; Mechili; Alamein; Tunisia; Normandy; Rhine
- Battle honours: See Battle honours below

Commanders
- Honorary Colonel: Colonel Simon G. Hutchinson, MBE
- Notable commanders: Sir Christopher Baynes, 1st Baronet; Lt-Col Hon Somerset Maxwell, MP; Lt-Col Viscount Malden

The Middlesex Yeomanry was a volunteer cavalry regiment of the British Army originally raised in 1797. It saw mounted and dismounted action in the Second Boer War and in the First World War at Gallipoli, Salonika and in Palestine, where one of its officers won a Victoria Cross at the Battle of Buqqar Ridge and the regiment rode into Damascus with 'Lawrence of Arabia'. Between the world wars the regiment was converted to the signals role and it provided communications for armoured formations in the Second World War, including service in minor operations in Iraq, Palestine, Syria and Iran, as well as the Western Desert, Italian and North-West European campaigns. It continued in the postwar Territorial Army and its lineage is maintained today by 31 (Middlesex Yeomanry and Princess Louise's Kensington) Signal Squadron, Royal Corps of Signals, which forms part of the Army Reserve.

== Formation and early history ==
In 1793 the Prime Minister, William Pitt the Younger, proposed that the English Counties form a force of Volunteer Yeoman Cavalry that could be called on by the King to defend the country against invasion or by the Lord Lieutenant to subdue any civil disorder within the country. A cavalry troop entitled the Uxbridge Volunteer Cavalry was raised by Christopher Baynes (later Sir Christopher Baynes, 1st Baronet) in 1797. By 1798 the unit consisted of over 100 men organised in two Troops. It was once called out, in 1801 to prevent rioting. After the Treaty of Amiens was concluded in 1802 the regiment was disbanded following a spate of industrial unrest and rioting, authorisation was given on 10 December 1830 to raise two new troops of Yeomanry in the Uxbridge district. It was raised as the Uxbridge Squadron of Yeomanry Cavalry with troops at Harefield and West Drayton, in 1830. The regiment was called upon to provide an escort for King William IV as he passed through Uxbridge to visit the Marquess of Westminster at Moor Park in 1834. The unit was called out on several occasions, notably in 1832 and at the time of the 1848 Chartist meeting on Kennington Common, but merely 'stood by' in barracks and saw no action.

The Uxbridge Squadron became the Middlesex Yeomanry Cavalry in 1838 with the following organisation:

- A Troop in London
- B Troop in Uxbridge
- C Troop in London
- D Troop in West Middlesex (including a contingent at Brighton, Sussex)

Following the Cardwell Reforms a mobilisation scheme began to appear in the Army List from December 1875. This assigned Regular and Yeomanry units places in an order of battle of corps, divisions and brigades for the 'Active Army', even though these formations were entirely theoretical, with no staff or services assigned. The Middlesex Yeomanry were assigned as 'divisional troops' to 3rd Division of II Corps based at Dorking, alongside Regular units of infantry, artillery and engineers.

In the early 1880s the regiment's headquarters (HQ) moved to 43 Albemarle Street in London's West End, later to 25 Chapel Street off Edgware Road, and it had the following organisation:

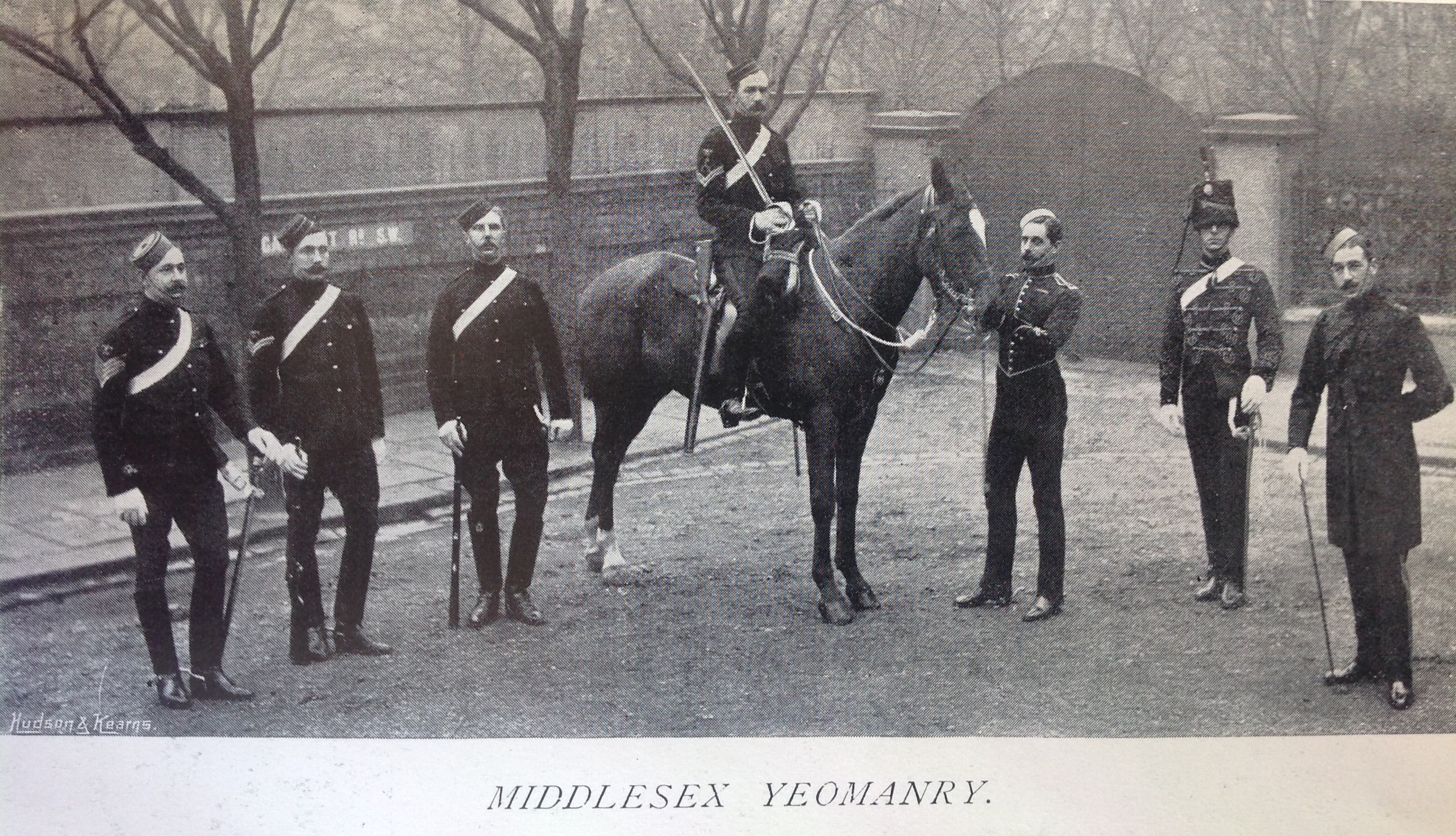
Group of different ranks, Middlesex Yeomanry, 1896

- A Troop in Brighton
- B Troop in London
- C Troop in London
- D Troop in West Middlesex

The regiment evolved to become the Middlesex Regiment of Yeomanry Cavalry (Uxbridge) in 1871 and, by order of Field Marshal the Duke of Cambridge, serving at that time as Commander-in-Chief of the Forces, the Middlesex (Duke of Cambridge's Hussars) Yeomanry Cavalry in 1884.

By 1899 RHQ was at 1 Cathcart Road, South Kensington, and the regiment was in the 1st Yeomanry Brigade together with the Berkshire Yeomanry.

== Imperial Yeomanry ==
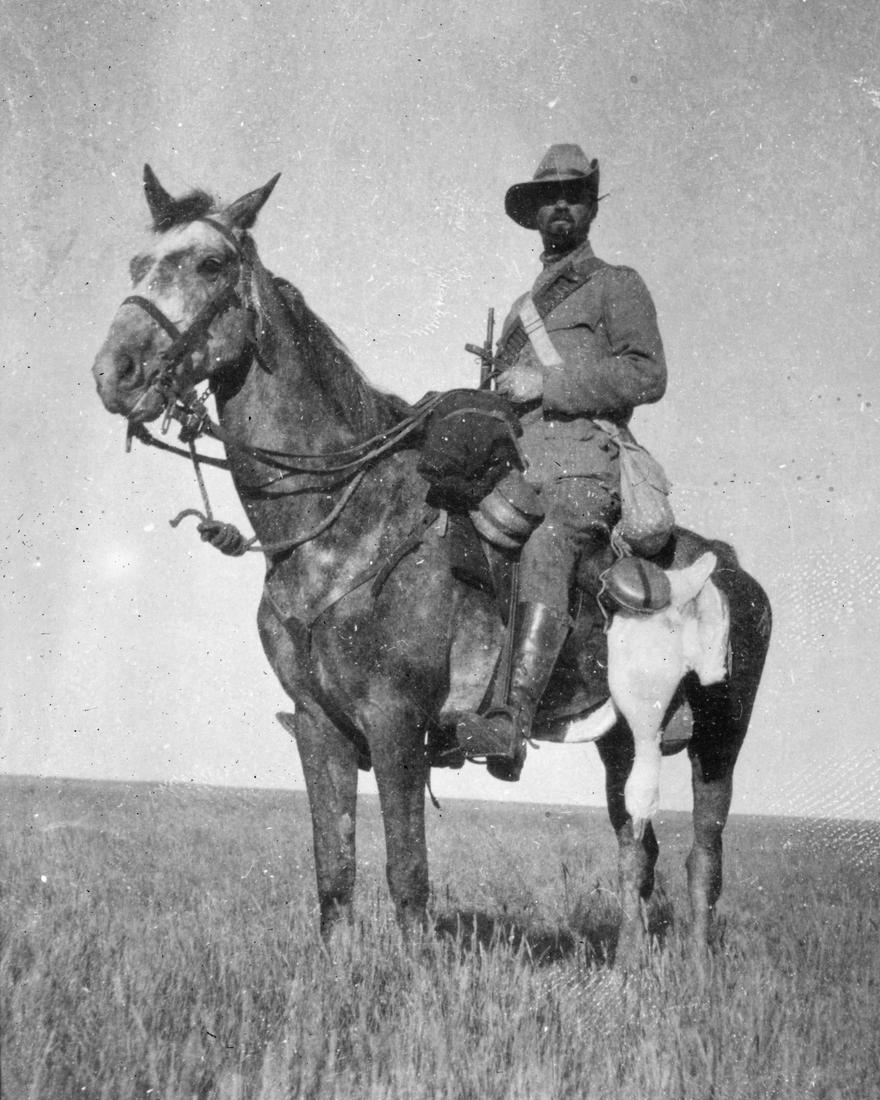
Imperial yeoman on the Veldt.

Following a string of defeats during Black Week in early December 1899, the British government realised that it would need more troops than just the regular army to fight the Second Boer War, particularly mounted troops. On 13 December, the War Office decided to allow volunteer forces to serve in the field, and a Royal Warrant was issued on 24 December that officially created the Imperial Yeomanry (IY). This was organised as county service companies of approximately 115 men enlisted for one year. Existing yeomen and fresh volunteers (mainly middle and upper class) quickly filled the new force, which was equipped to operate as Mounted infantry.

The Middlesex Yeomanry raised the 34th and 35th (Middlesex) Companies, which served alongside two Royal East Kent Yeomanry in 11th Battalion, arriving in South Africa on 20 March, and 62nd (Middlesex) Company in 14th Battalion, which disembarked on 4 May. In 1901 it raised 112th (Middlesex) Company for the second contingent, and this company also served with 11th Bn. In 1902, 14th Bn was disbanded and 62nd (Middlesex) Company joined 11th Bn.

At the beginning of May 1900 the 11th Battalion IY, under the command of Lt-Col W.K. Mitford of the Middlesex Yeomanry, was with 8th Division in Lt-Gen Sir Leslie Rundle's column. Lord Roberts resumed his advance into the Orange Free State on 3 May, ordering Rundle to prevent any Boers from re-occupying the south-east of the country. On 25 May Maj Henry Dalbiac (a former Royal Artillery officer and veteran of Tel el Kebir) with 34th (Middlesex) Company, acting as advance guard, entered the empty town of Senekal. The Boers attacked the town later in the day, killing Dalbiac and three others. Four of the troopers were wounded and 13 surrendered, while seven made their escape. The rest of the division reoccupied the town later in the day.

The war ground on as the Imperial forces tried to control the Boer Commandos with a system of blockhouse lines. Rundle's force was building one such line that had reached Tweefontein just before Christmas 1901, watched by a large commando under Christiaan de Wet. 11th Battalion IY was the main part of a covering force of 400 yeomanry and two guns camped on the nearby hill of Groenkop under the command of Maj Williams. The approaches were inadequately picketed, and at 02.00 on Christmas morning de Wet led his men up the hill. They were already halfway up before they were challenged by a sentry, and immediately stormed the camp, sweeping through the tents and transport lines in the dark. Of around 550 men in camp, almost 350 were killed or captured in the Battle of Groenkop, and the camp was looted by the hungry Boers. However, it was their last major success, and the war ended in April 1902. The Middlesex IY companies earned the regiment its first Battle honour: South Africa 1900–01.

The IY concept was considered a success and before the war ended the existing Yeomanry regiments at home were converted into Imperial Yeomanry, the Middlesex becoming the Middlesex Imperial Yeomanry (Duke of Cambridge's Hussars) in 1901. It HQ was at Rutland Yard, Knightsbridge The Imperial Yeomanry were subsumed into the new Territorial Force (TF) under the Haldane Reforms of 1908, the Middlesex becoming the 1st County of London Yeomanry (Middlesex, Duke of Cambridge's Hussars). It formed part of the TF's London Mounted Brigade. Regimental HQ moved to the Duke of York's Headquarters in Chelsea in 1912.

== First World War ==
In accordance with the Territorial and Reserve Forces Act 1907 (7 Edw. 7, c.9) which brought the TF into being, it was intended to be a home defence force for service during wartime and members could not be compelled to serve outside the country. However, on the outbreak of war on 4 August 1914, many members volunteered for Imperial Service. Therefore, TF units were split in August and September 1914 into 1st Line (liable for overseas service) and 2nd Line (home service for those unable or unwilling to serve overseas) units. Later, a 3rd Line was formed to act as a reserve, providing trained replacements for the 1st and 2nd Line regiments.

=== 1/1st County of London Yeomanry ===
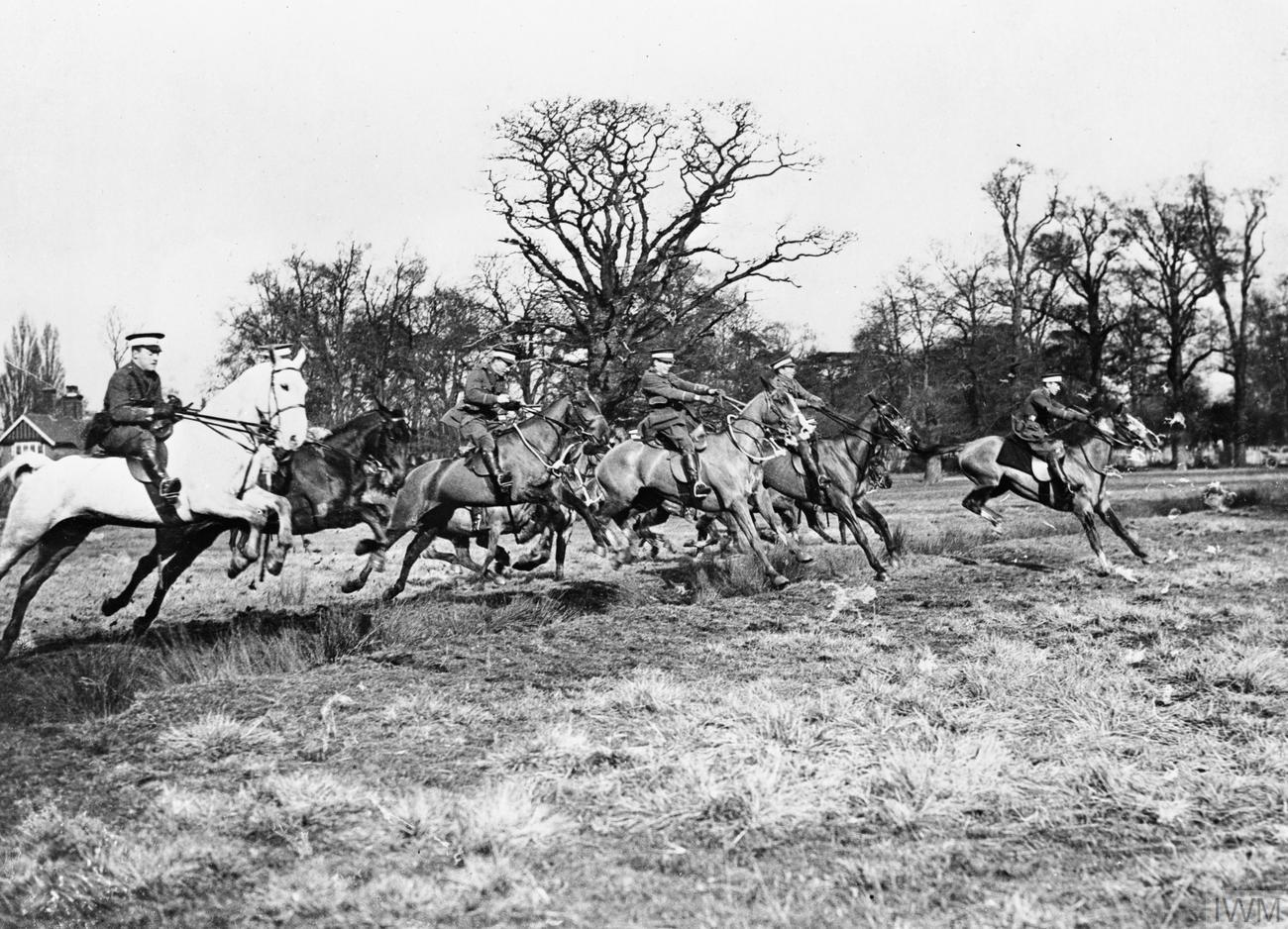
Officers of the 1st County of London Yeomanry (Middlesex, The Duke of Cambridge's Hussars) charge during training in Richmond Park, 10 February 1915.

The 1st Line regiment was mobilised in August 1914 and moved with the London Mounted Brigade to Hounslow before joining the 2nd Mounted Division at Streatley. In mid-November 1914 the division moved to Norfolk as part of the coast defences. In April 1915 the regiment was at Mundesley when the brigade was ordered overseas. The regiment entrained for Avonmouth Docks where the men embarked on the Nile on 14 April and sailed for Egypt. The horses were loaded aboard the cramped and insanitary Crispin, and 32 died during the voyage. On arrival the brigade was sent to the Suez Canal defences near Ismailia, being redesignated the 4th (London) Mounted Bde.

==== Gallipoli ====
On 10 August the 2nd Mounted Division was ordered to reorganise as a dismounted formation and prepare to proceed overseas. Each regiment left a squadron HQ and the officers and men of two troops to look after the horses. On 13 August the rest of the regiment (16 officers and 320 other ranks) entrained for Alexandria where they boarded the Caledonia the next day. It arrived at Mudros on 16 August, transhipped them to the Doris next day, and on 18 August they landed at Suvla Bay to join in the Gallipoli Campaign.

On the afternoon of 21 August the division was ordered to advance from Lala Baba across the plain to Chocolate Hill and then attack the Turkish positions on the W Hills. The advance across the plain was described by a Turkish artillery officer as presenting 'a target such as artillerymen thought impossible outside the world of dreams'. On reaching Chocolate Hill the dismounted Yeomen continued towards Scimitar Hill and Hill 112 without having a chance to reconnoitre the position or be properly briefed. Part of the hill was captured, but the surviving Yeomen came under enfilade fire and by nightfall were hanging onto a ragged line halfway up the hills. By the time the Middlesex Yeomanry were withdrawn to Lala Baba the following day they had suffered casualties of 10 killed or died of wounds and 46 wounded. This, the Battle of Scimitar Hill, was the last British attack delivered on the Suvla Front.

From now on the regiment took its turns holding the front line. By 4 September the Yeomanry were so weak from casualties and sickness that the brigade (1/1st County of London (Middlesex), 1/1st City of London (Rough Riders) and 1/3rd County of London (Sharpshooters)) was formed into a composite 4th London Regiment of Yeomanry. The regiment was relieved on 17 September by the Scottish Horse, one look-out mistakenly reporting the arrival of some Scottish Gaelic-speaking soldiers as a Turkish break-in. When the Middlesex Yeomanry were withdrawn to Lala Baba on 1 November they were reduced to fewer than 50 men. They were evacuated to Mudros and then Egypt to recuperate, the regiment regaining its independence in December.

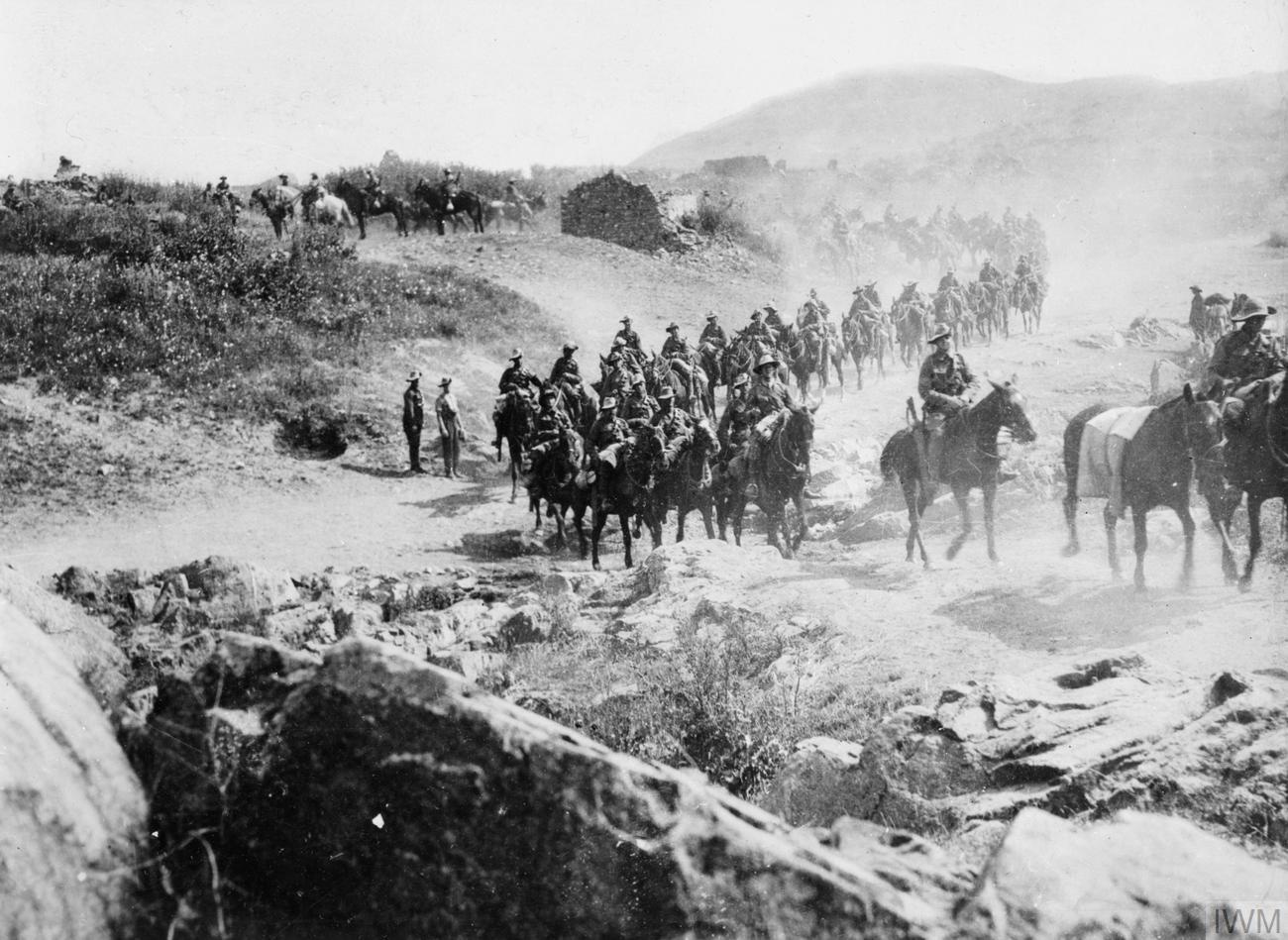
Yeomanry move down a track into the Struma Valley, Salonika front, summer 1916.

==== Salonika ====
During December 1915 and January 1916 the 2nd Mounted Division was broken up and its units distributed to other formations. 4th (London) Mounted Brigade was redesignated 8th Mounted Brigade and sent to Abbassia to return to the Suez Canal defences. In November the brigade was sent to the Macedonian front, disembarking at Salonika and going up-country to serve as GHQ troops. On occasions mounted parties of the Middlesex Yeomanry, riding with muffled bits, were sent out at night into No man's land (here about 1 mile (1.6 km) wide) to erect barbed wire obstacles.

==== Palestine ====
In June 1917 the regiment was withdrawn with 8th Mounted Brigade to Egypt and then moved up to the Palestine Front, where it joined the Yeomanry Mounted Division that was forming at Khan Yunis in the Egyptian Expeditionary Force (EEF).

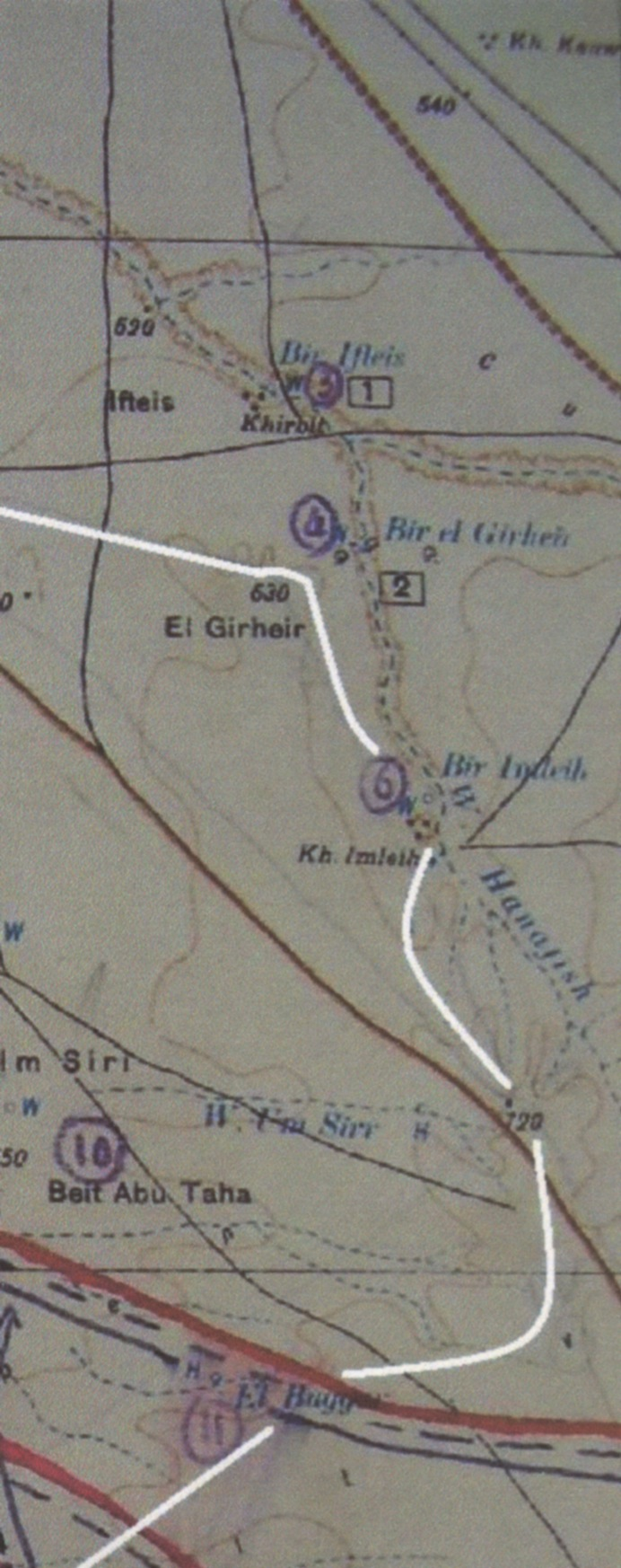
Detail of the el Girheir to el Buqqar defensive line

The campaign was coming to the end of a period of stalemate, with the EEF preparing to renew its offensive. The Turkish Yildirim Army Group carried out a reconnaissance in force in late October against 8th Mounted Brigade, which was holding a 14 miles (23 km) outpost line along the el Buqqar ridge to cover railway construction parties. At 04:10 on 27 October a post on Point 630 held by the Middlesex Yeomanry was attacked by an Ottoman cavalry patrol in great strength, bringing on the Battle of Buqqar Ridge. Two Yeomanry troops ordered forward in support advanced through heavy fire to find the post almost surrounded. A squadron of the City of London Yeomanry in reserve advanced, also under heavy fire, to occupy a position 200 yards (180 m) south of the threatened post, which stopped the Ottoman forces from completely surrounding the Middlesex men. By 10.55 an Ottoman infantry attack was developing against the post. The defenders were driven off the hill but withdrew to a trench just below the crest and held out there during the day against odds of 20 to 1, with the attackers closing to within 40 yards (37 m). Fighting continued until late in the afternoon when troops from the 53rd (Welsh) Division drove off the attackers. The Yeomanry post had lost 4 dead and 14 wounded.

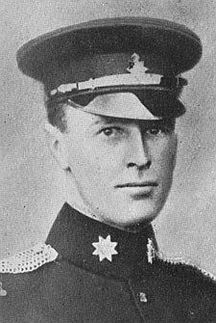
Major Alexander Lafone, VC.

Meanwhile, Point 720 held by two troops from B Squadron, Middlesex Yeomanry, commanded by Major Alexander Malins Lafone, had been attacked by several Ottoman cavalry squadrons, and later by heavy rifle and machine gun fire and occasional artillery shells. The post was out of communication from 06.00 and reinforcements were unable to break through. After six hours and two unsuccessful mounted charges, the final attack on Hill 720 was made by 1200 Ottoman cavalry supported by machine-gun and artillery fire. All except three of the Yeomanry on Hill 720 were killed. Major Lafone was awarded a posthumous Victoria Cross for encouraging his men to resist the Ottoman attack.

On 31 October 1917 the EEF opened its own offensive with the Third Battle of Gaza. The Yeomanry were initially held in reserve, but on 6 November the division went into action as part of the Desert Mounted Corps (DMC) at the Capture of the Sheria Position. There followed a pursuit towards Jerusalem, in which the Yeomanry took part in the battles of Mughar Ridge (13 November) and Nebi Samwil outside Jerusalem (17–24 November). The Turks counter-attacked on 27 November and the Yeomanry held the line for two days. Jerusalem surrendered on 9 December.

The crisis on the Western Front caused by the German spring offensive in March 1918 led to an urgent call for reinforcements from Palestine. A number of formations were 'Indianised', roughly two-thirds of their British units being sent to France and replaced by Indian Army units. The Yeomanry Division was one such, becoming the 1st Mounted Division, and later the 4th Cavalry Division, while the 8th Mounted Brigade became the 11th Cavalry Brigade. The Middlesex Yeomanry remained with the 11th, now brigaded with the 29th Lancers and 36th Jacob's Horse.

The EEF launched its final offensive, the Battle of Megiddo, on 19 September 1918. The DMC was on the coast, massed behind the infantry to exploit the breakthrough. 4th Cavalry Division was launched four hours after Zero at 08.40 and advanced against slight resistance. The division paused after 12 hours, then overran the Turks' primitive third line defences. It paused to water the horses in the evening, then moved off again an hour before midnight, riding into the German–Turkish HQ at Afulah and then heading east to Beisan to cut off Turkish retreat. The division rode 70 miles (110 km) in 34 hours. There was still a 25 miles (40 km) gap through which the Turks could escape across the River Jordan, and on 23 September 11th Cavalry Brigade was ordered to ride south down both banks of the river to cut off this route. It encountered the HQ elements of the German Asia Corps at Makhadet abu Naji; after a fight the cavalry charged to seal off both sides of the ford, capturing 4000 prisoners. The following morning the brigade completed the closure of the net by seizing the fords at Makhadet el Masudi and gathering another 5000 prisoners. 4th Cavalry Division now turned north to cooperate with the Arab Northern Army's advance on Damascus. The men were beginning to suffer from malaria, influenza and hunger, and the advance slowed, but on 30 September 11th Brigade was pushed on ahead and caught up with Col T. E. Lawrence and the Arab irregulars attacking the Turkish rearguard. Lawrence asked for help, and was sent the Middlesex Yeomanry and the Hampshire Royal Horse Artillery. The gunners fired over open sights until darkness fell, then the Yeomanry and Arabs charged the Turks in the rear, forcing them into the Arab trap. Damascus fell the following morning. The Turkish Army was broken, and the Armistice of Mudros ended the war in the Middle East a month later.

=== 2/1st County of London Yeomanry ===
The 2nd Line regiment was formed at Chelsea in 1914 and in November 1914 it was at Ranelagh Park. By June 1915 it was with 2/1st London Mounted Brigade in 2/2nd Mounted Division and was at Bylaugh Park (north east of East Dereham) in Norfolk. In October it was at Blickling Hall. On 31 March 1916, the remaining Mounted Brigades were ordered to be numbered in a single sequence; the brigade was numbered as 12th Mounted Brigade and the division as 3rd Mounted Division.

In July 1916, the regiment was converted to a cyclist unit in 4th Cyclist Brigade, 1st Cyclist Division in the North Walsham area. In November 1916, the division was broken up and regiment was merged with the 2/3rd County of London Yeomanry (Sharpshooters) to form 6th (1st and 3rd County of London) Yeomanry Cyclist Regiment in 2nd Cyclist Brigade, probably at Reepham. In March 1917 it resumed its identity as 2/1st County of London Yeomanry and moved to Overstrand; in the autumn it moved to Melton Constable. In May 1918 the regiment moved to Ireland and was stationed at The Curragh, still in 2nd Cyclist Brigade, until the end of the war.

=== 3/1st County of London Yeomanry ===
The 3rd Line regiment was formed in April 1915 at Ranelagh and in the summer it was affiliated to a Reserve Cavalry Regiment in Eastern Command. In the summer of 1916 it was affiliated to the 6th Reserve Cavalry Regiment at The Curragh. Early in 1917 it was absorbed into the 2nd Reserve Cavalry Regiment at The Curragh.

== Interwar ==
After the war, it was clear that there were more cavalry units than needed and it was decided that only the 14 most senior Yeomanry regiments would retain their mounts, forming the 2nd Cavalry Division in the reorganised Territorial Army (TA). Most of the remainder chose to convert to armoured cars or artillery in 1920. Uniquely, the Middlesex Yeomanry elected to become a signal unit, joining the new Royal Corps of Signals when that was formed two months later. It became 2nd Cavalry Divisional Signals (Middlesex Yeomanry), (Note: Divisional signal units of the Royal Signals 1920–45 were battalion-sized and commanded by a Major or Lieutenant-Colonel; they were not termed 'regiments' until 1946.) of two squadrons (A and B), with HQ still at the Duke of York's Headquarters.

In the late 1930s, mechanisation of the British Army was proceeding, and an experimental armoured formation was created as The Mobile Division, later 1st Armoured Division. In 1938 the Middlesex Yeomanry became Mobile Divisional Signals (Middlesex Yeomanry). When the TA was doubled in size after the Munich Crisis the unit raised a second line as the Horse Cavalry Brigade Signal Troops. Shortly afterwards the two units became1st and 2nd (Middlesex Yeomanry) Armoured Divisional Signals.

== Second World War ==
=== 1st Cavalry Divisional Signals ===
Soon after the outbreak of war the first line unit became 1st Cavalry Divisional Signals (Middlesex Yeomanry), the 1st (and only) Cavalry Division being composed mainly of horsed Yeomanry regiments. It joined Divisional HQ when the formation assembled in Northern Command on 1 November 1939. It then left the UK on 18 January 1940 and travelled across France to embark at Marseille for Palestine, arriving on 31 January. A divisional signal unit provided communications (line, wireless and despatch rider) from divisional HQ down to the level of individual unit HQs; each brigade was allocated a squadron and the establishment for cavalry divisional signals included its own Light Aid Detachment of the Royal Army Ordnance Corps.

==== 'Kingcol' ====
At first, the division's role was internal security, while its mounted units underwent mechanisation. The signal unit detached Troops that formed new signal units for service at Tobruk and on Crete. Then, after a German-backed coup d'état in Iraq in April 1941, the Royal Air Force (RAF) training base at Habbaniya came under siege by Iraqi Nationalist forces. A relief column, known as 'Habforce', was organised from the troops available in Palestine. On 8 May Brigadier 'Joe' Kingstone of 4th Cavalry Brigade (the only one yet motorised) was sent on ahead with his brigade HQ and signals leading a Flying column named 'Kingcol' to effect a relief of the airbase as soon as possible.

Kingcol operated as a self-contained unit with 12 days' rations and five days' water. It moved out from Transjordan following the Amman–Baghdad road and Mosul–Haifa oil pipeline to the fort of Rutba, which had been recaptured by the Arab Legion and 2nd RAF Armoured Car Squadron on 10 May. Kingcol moved out from Rutba on 15 May, crossing the desert in exceptionally hot weather, digging the heavy vehicles out when they broke through the surface of the poor tracks, and under attack by German aircraft. The direct road to Habbaniya was blocked by Iraqi troops at Ramadi, but engineers from Habbaniya had bridged the canal to the south and Kingcol arrived from that direction on 18 May. Kingcol and the Habbaniya garrison now attacked Fallujah, moving up both sides of the Euphrates on 19 May and capturing the bridge in only half an hour (the Battle of Fallujah). An Iraqi counter-attack was driven off on 22 May, but the British and Assyrian troops fought back ferociously and the Iraqis withdrew. Kingcol now advanced on Baghdad, rumour magnifying the size of the small British forces, and the Iraqis asked for an armistice on 30 May.

In mid-June, Habforce joined the campaign against Vichy French forces in Syria. Its role was to advance across the desert from Iraq and capture Palmyra, while a direct attack (Operation Exporter) was made from Palestine towards Damascus by a force including part of 1st Cavalry Division. 4th Cavalry Brigade's advance with Habforce was continually harried by Vichy Air Force attacks and it lost a lot of men and vehicles. After the fall of Damascus and Palmyra, the Syria–Lebanon campaign ended on 14 July with the Armistice of Saint Jean d'Acre.

=== 9th Armoured Brigade Signals ===
9th Armoured Brigade's formation sign, the horse referencing its mounted Yeomanry origins.

==== Persia ====
Having progressed with its mechanisation 1st Cavalry Division was reorganised as 10th Armoured Division on 1 August 1941 in Syria, though it was still short of vital units and equipment. 4th Cavalry Brigade became 9th Armoured Brigade (in fact motorised rather than armoured) and was immediately detached to cross Iraq with 'Hazelforce' and take part in the Anglo-Soviet invasion of Iran. 9th Armoured and 2nd Indian Brigades advanced to Shahabad in conjunction with other columns and on 28 August the pro-Axis Persian government fell. British and Soviet forces entered Teheran on 17 September and 9th Armoured Brigade returned to Palestine the following month.

In March 1942 'F' Divisional Signals arrived from the UK having been detached from 11th Armoured Division. It merged with the former cavalry divisional signals and became the larger part of 10th Armoured Divisional Signals, while the Middlesex Yeomanry provided 9th Armoured Brigade Signal Squadron. The former CO of 11th Armoured Divisional Signals, Lt-Col R.H.O. Coryton, took command, and the CO of Cavalry Division Signals, Lt-Col the Hon Somerset Maxwell, MP, a pre-war Middesex Yeomanry officer, moved to take command of 7th Armoured Division Signals; he was mortally wounded at Alamein later in the year.

==== 'Calforce' ====
10th Armoured Division remained in Palestine until the end of April 1942 when part of it moved up to Libya and was engaged in the confused Second Battle of Ruweisat Ridge (El Mreir) (21–22 July). 9th Armoured Bde did not follow to Egypt until May, and remained in the Nile Delta area as an independent brigade until August. It was then sent up to join 'Calforce' under the command of Brig Percy Calvert-Jones of 12th Anti-Aircraft Brigade who had gathered a heterogeneous collection of artillery units in a series of rearguard actions during Eighth Army's long retreat to the El Alamein position. Eighth Army used 'Calforce' as a blocking force and 9th Armoured Bde was attached to it from 26 August to 8 September.

==== Alamein ====
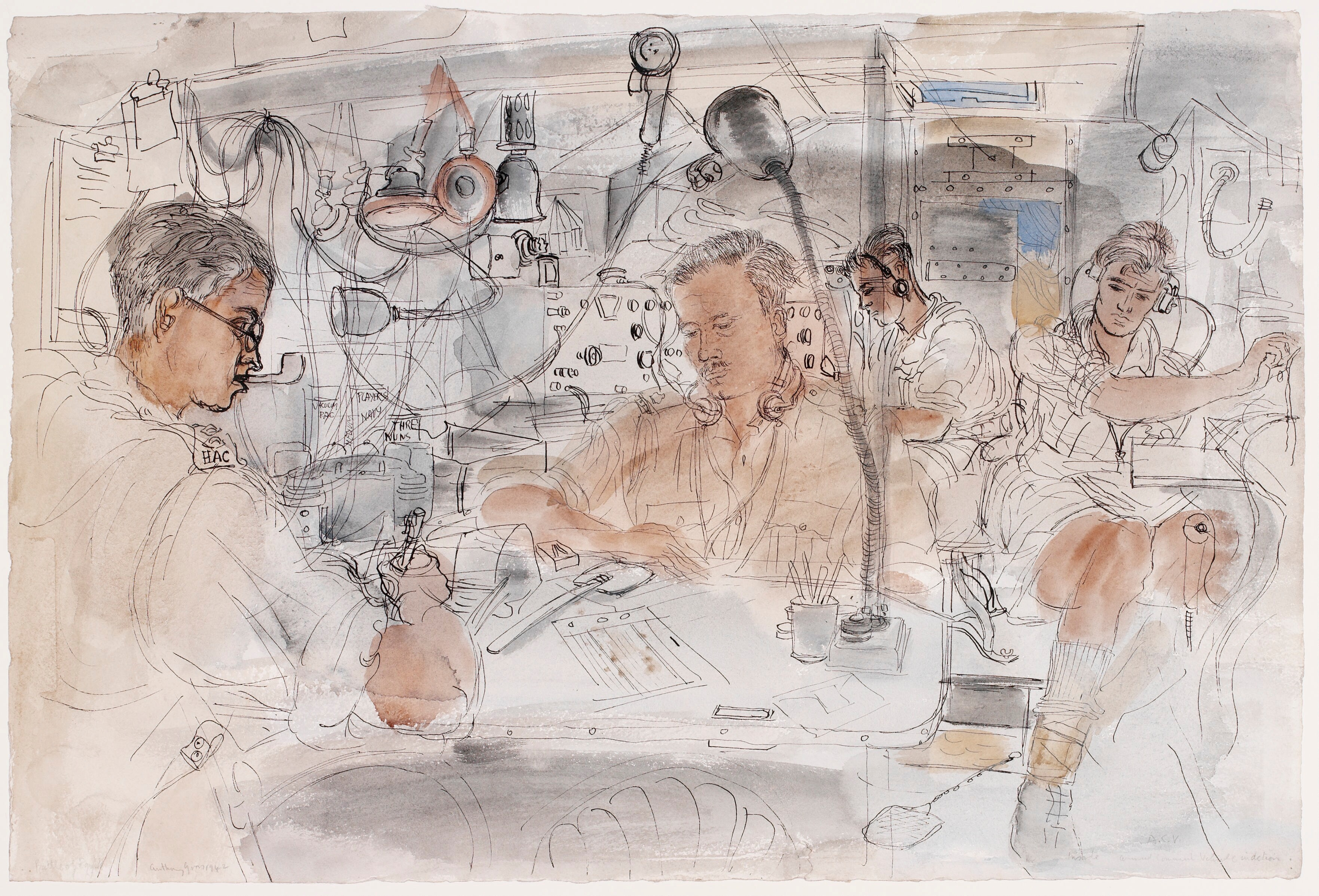
Inside an Armoured Command Vehicle in Action, sketch by Anthony Gross, Egypt 1942.

As an independent formation, 9th Armoured Bde was assigned to support the 2nd New Zealand Division in the Second Battle of El Alamein. In the first phase (Operation Lightfoot) on 23 October, the New Zealanders took most of their objectives, but 9th Armoured ran into an undetected minefield and was held up. At daybreak it was in the open and under fire. During the 'Dog fight' phase of the battle over succeeding days the New Zealand Division and 9th Armoured Bde were withdrawn into reserve, and 9th Armoured was given priority for re-equipment. It went into action again in the second phase of the battle (Operation Supercharge), tasked with advancing beyond the New Zealanders' first objective to smash through the deeper Axis defences. It left its rest area near El Alamein station by 20.00 on 1 November and made a difficult approach march through darkness and dust, and its delayed attack began just before dawn. The brigade ran into heavy opposition and lost most of its tanks, but tried to hold the ground taken so that 1st Armoured Division could pass through and continue the attack.

After Alamein 9th Armoured Bde was sent off with 2nd New Zealand Division to pursue the beaten Axis forces, though it was badly held up by road congestion and only managed 12 miles (19 km) on the first day (4 November). Two days later it was running short of fuel. On 11 November, while the New Zealanders continued their pursuit, 9th Armoured Bde was withdrawn and returned to join 10th Armoured Division in the Delta. By the beginning of 1943 it was back in Syria.

10th Armoured Division was not required for the Sicilian or Italian campaigns, where the terrain was not suitable for large armoured formations, and divisional HQ and signals were finally disbanded on 15 June 1944. Its component brigades, however, continued as independent formations. 9th Armoured Bde joined Ninth Army in May 1943 and remained with it Palestine and Syria until returning to Egypt in March 1944. On 30 April the brigade embarked and joined Eighth Army in Italy on 5 May.

==== Italy ====
The brigade was allotted to XIII Corps, which in turn assigned it to 78th Infantry Division for the Battle of Lake Trasimeno beginning on 20 June. While the fighting continued, 10th Indian Infantry Division of X Corps took up the advance and 9th Armoured Bde was transferred to its command. The brigade protected the corps' right flank during the advance towards Florence, then was switched to the left to support the success of 4th Indian Infantry Division. For the next phase of the campaign, Operation Olive to breach the Gothic Line, 9th Armoured Bde was back with 10th Indian Division in X Corps; Brigade HQ controlled two armoured car regiments patrolling the mountainous country.

9th Armoured Bde HQ was then pulled out of the line for a new role: commanding specialist armour for the future crossing of the River Po. This included Duplex Drive amphibious tanks and armoured personnel carriers. The brigade began training in October but the advance to the Po was delayed by the onset of winter. The brigade took up normal duties in the line until February 1945 when it resumed specialist training. The actual crossing in the final stages of the Spring offensive (Operation Grapeshot) began on 23 April, and the German forces in Italy surrendered on 2 May.

9th Armoured Bde Group was then selected for operations in the Far East. The personnel were airlifted back to the UK from Italy in August, but before they could reorganise and retrain the Surrender of Japan ended the war.

=== 2nd Armoured Divisional Signals ===
2nd Armoured Division formation sign, as painted on vehicles.

The second line unit of the Middlesex Yeomanry joined 2nd Armoured Division HQ in Northern Command on 4 March 1940. When the Battle of France was lost and the British Expeditionary Force was being evacuated from Dunkirk (without its equipment) at the end of May, the incomplete 2nd Armoured Division was the only armoured formation available to Home Forces. It was moved into the area between Northampton and Newmarket to be ready to counter-attack in the event of invasion.

However, even at the time of greatest invasion threat, the British Government was prepared to send armoured units to reinforce Middle East Forces facing the Italians. As the threat of invasion of the United Kingdom receded, it became possible to spare more troops and equipment for the Middle East. 2nd Armoured Division (less 22nd Armoured Brigade) was the first significant formation sent. It embarked on 26 October 1940 and landed in Egypt on 1 January 1941.

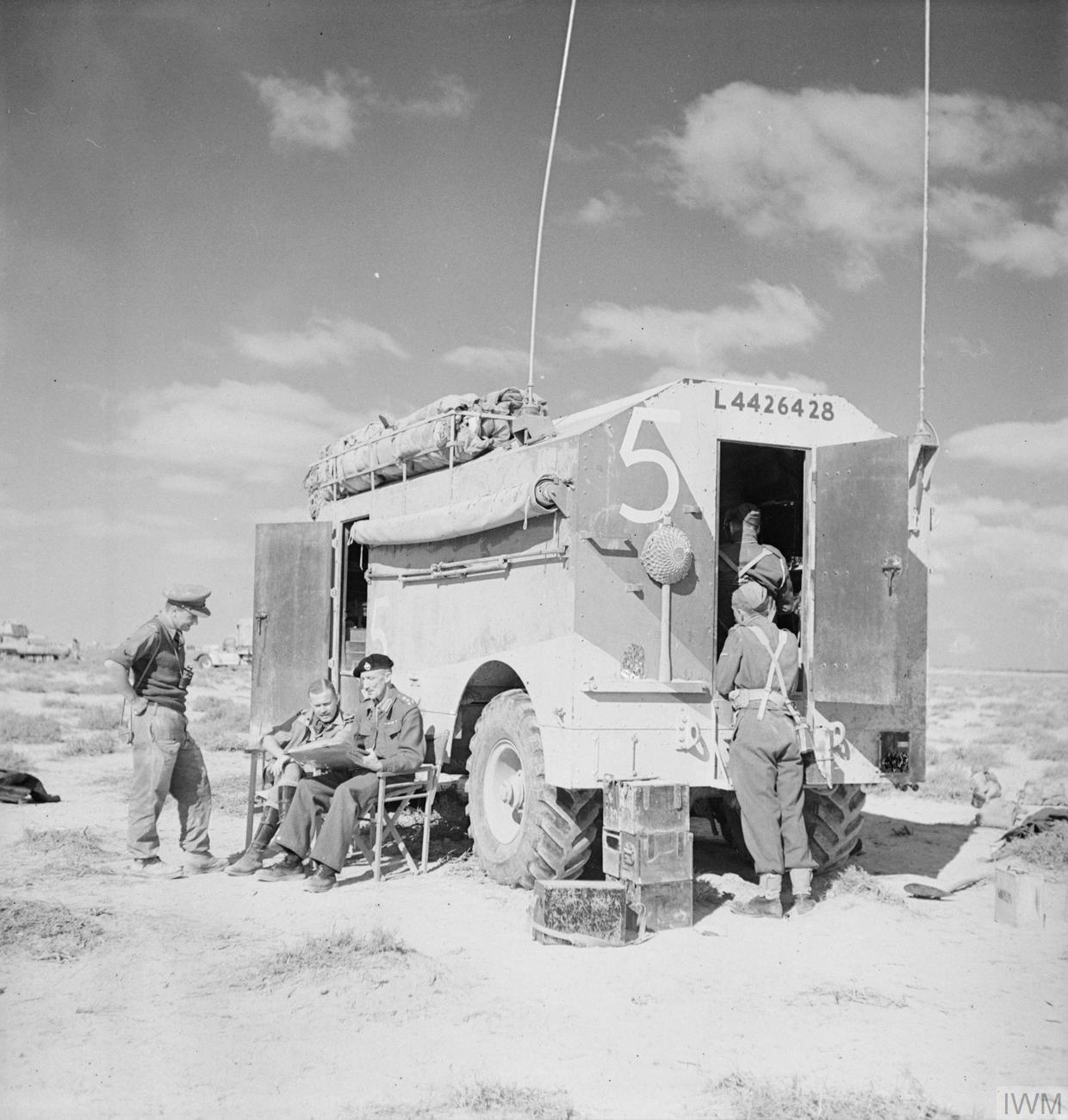
An AEC armoured command vehicle in the desert.

The British offensive into Libya (Operation Compass) was already under way, and part of the division was sent up into Cyrenaica in early February before it was really ready, where it reinforced the near-exhausted 7th Armoured Division in the final stages of the operation. The rest of the division remained on the lines of communication. There was now a pause in operations, but even by the end of March the division was short of serviceable equipment. On 31 March 2nd Armoured Division under the command of Maj-Gen Michael Gambier-Parry was holding the front when Gen Erwin Rommel opened the Axis counter-offensive (Operation Sonnenblume) and began pushing it back. It was taking almost two hours to transmit messages to Cyrenaica Command and the fighting became confused. On 6 April Cyrenaica Command ordered 2nd Armoured Division HQ to withdraw, but it is unlikely that the order ever got through, though it was picked up by 3rd Armoured Brigade's HQ. Divisional HQ and a collection of other units was caught by Rommel's forces at Mechili on 7 April. Gambier-Parry rejected two offers to surrender while his troops and HQ staff fought off attacks, and some units broke out at dawn the following day, but most of 2nd Armoured Division HQ and Signals became Prisoners of War.

=== 22nd Armoured Brigade Signals ===
22nd Armoured Brigade's formation sign.

==== North Africa and Italy ====
22nd Armoured Brigade and its signal squadron had been left in the UK while the rest of 2nd Armoured Division sailed to Egypt. It finally arrived on 2 October, long after 2nd Armoured Division had been captured. The brigade served through the rest of the Western Desert Campaign under the command alternately of 1st and 7th Armoured Divisions, seeing action at the Relief of Tobruk in November 1941, and the battles of Gazala, Mersa Matruh, First Alamein and Alam el Halfa. From the Second Battle of El Alamein the brigade became a permanent part of 7th Armoured Division. It served through the Tunisian Campaign at Medenine, the Mareth Line, Wadi Akarit, Enfidaville, and the capture of Tunis. It then took part in the landings at Salerno on the Italian mainland, the advance on Naples and the Volturno crossing before being withdrawn to the UK. Equipment was transferred to 5th Canadian Armoured Division and the personnel sailed from Naples to Glasgow, docking on 7 January 1944.

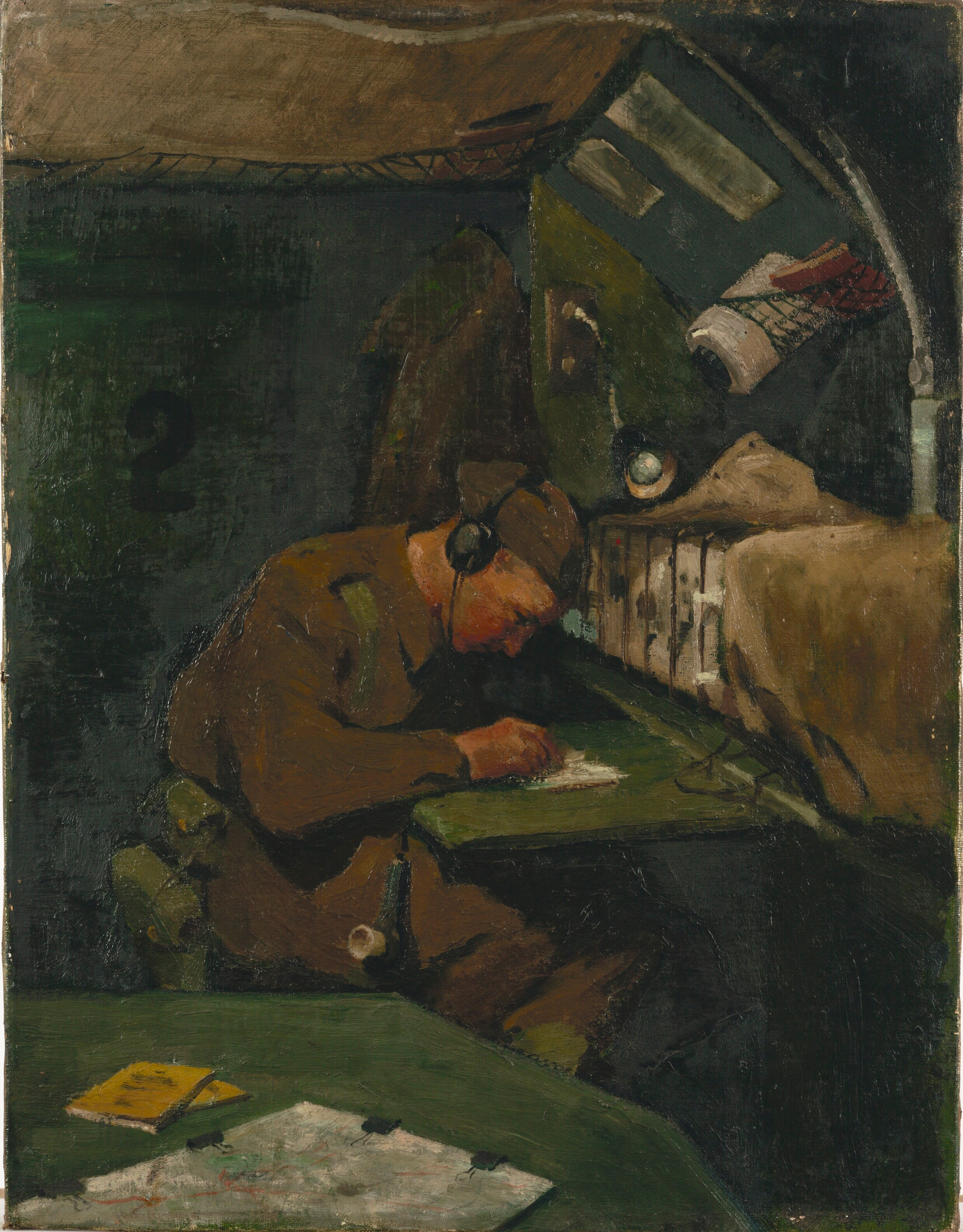
A wireless-operator in an Armoured Command Vehicle, painting by Thomas Freeth, 1942.

==== Normandy ====
By 1944 an armoured brigade signal squadron (4 Sqn of divisional signals) was organised as Sqn HQ (2 officers and 23 other ranks (ORs)), W Troop (1 officer and 51 ORs) with brigade HQ, V Trp (19 ORs) with the motor battalion, and X, Y and Z Trps (each of 15 ORs) with the three armoured regiments. 22nd Armoured Brigade was re-equipped and trained in the area round Brandon, Suffolk, to take part in the Allied landings in Normandy (Operation Overlord). The brigade was to sail in assault landing craft and land on D Day and D + 1, followed by the rest of 7th Armoured Division. It embarked on Landing Craft Tank (LCTs) at Felixstowe on 4 June and landed successfully on Gold Beach during the morning of D + 1 (7 June).

On 10 June, 22nd Armoured Bde led the division's advance towards Villers-Bocage, but progress was slow through the restricted Bocage country, and the brigade was badly beaten at the Battle of Villers Bocage on 13 June. In July the division was moved to the area north of Caen to take part in Operation Goodwood. The armour crossed the River Orne on 18 July and attacked behind massive artillery and air bombardment, but 7th Armoured was caught in traffic congestion and barely got into action. The division was shifted west again to take part in Operation Bluecoat (1–2 August), but failed to gain its objective, the commanders of 7th Armoured Division and 22nd Armoured Bde being sacked. The division came into its own after the breakout from the Normandy beachhead, when it advanced rapidly across northern France and Belgium, liberating towns as they went, including Ghent on 5 September.

==== Low Countries and Germany ====
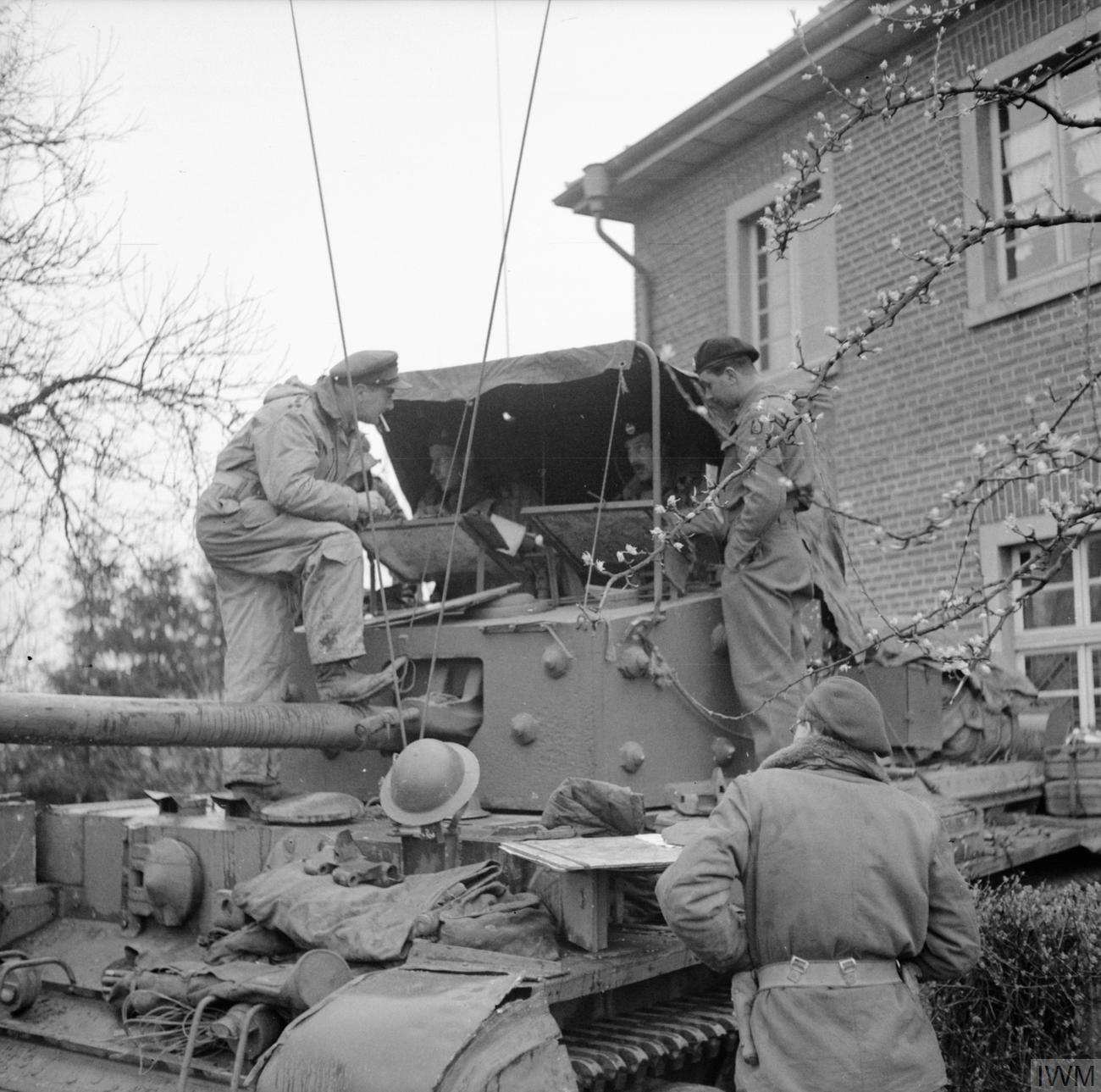
The Cromwell command tank (with multiple wireless aerials) of Brig Tony Wingfield, commanding 22nd Armoured Bde, 31 March 1945.

The rest of September and October was spent in probing operations while 21st Army Group's emphasis shifted to Antwerp and Operation Market Garden, where the division was called in to clear XXX Corps' severed supply lines. 22nd Armoured Bde cooperated with 51st (Highland) Division around 's-Hertogenbosch, but much of the country was unsuitable for tanks. It was not until 13 January 1945 that the division participated in a major attack (Operation Blackcock) towards Roermond. The division then rested and prepared for the crossing of the Rhine, Operation Plunder. The infantry began their assault crossing on the night of 23/24 March, followed by an airborne landing (Operation Varsity) next day. By 27 March the Sappers had bridged the river and 7th Armoured began to cross. At first progress was slow, but on 29 March 22nd Armoured Bde fanned out leading the advance; the division made 120 miles (190 km) by 2 April, only halted by the River Ems. 11th Armoured Division having captured a bridge intact, 22nd Armoured Bde resumed its advance, now a pursuit. Hamburg surrendered to 7th Armoured Division on 3 May, and the German surrender at Lüneburg Heath followed next day.

== Postwar ==
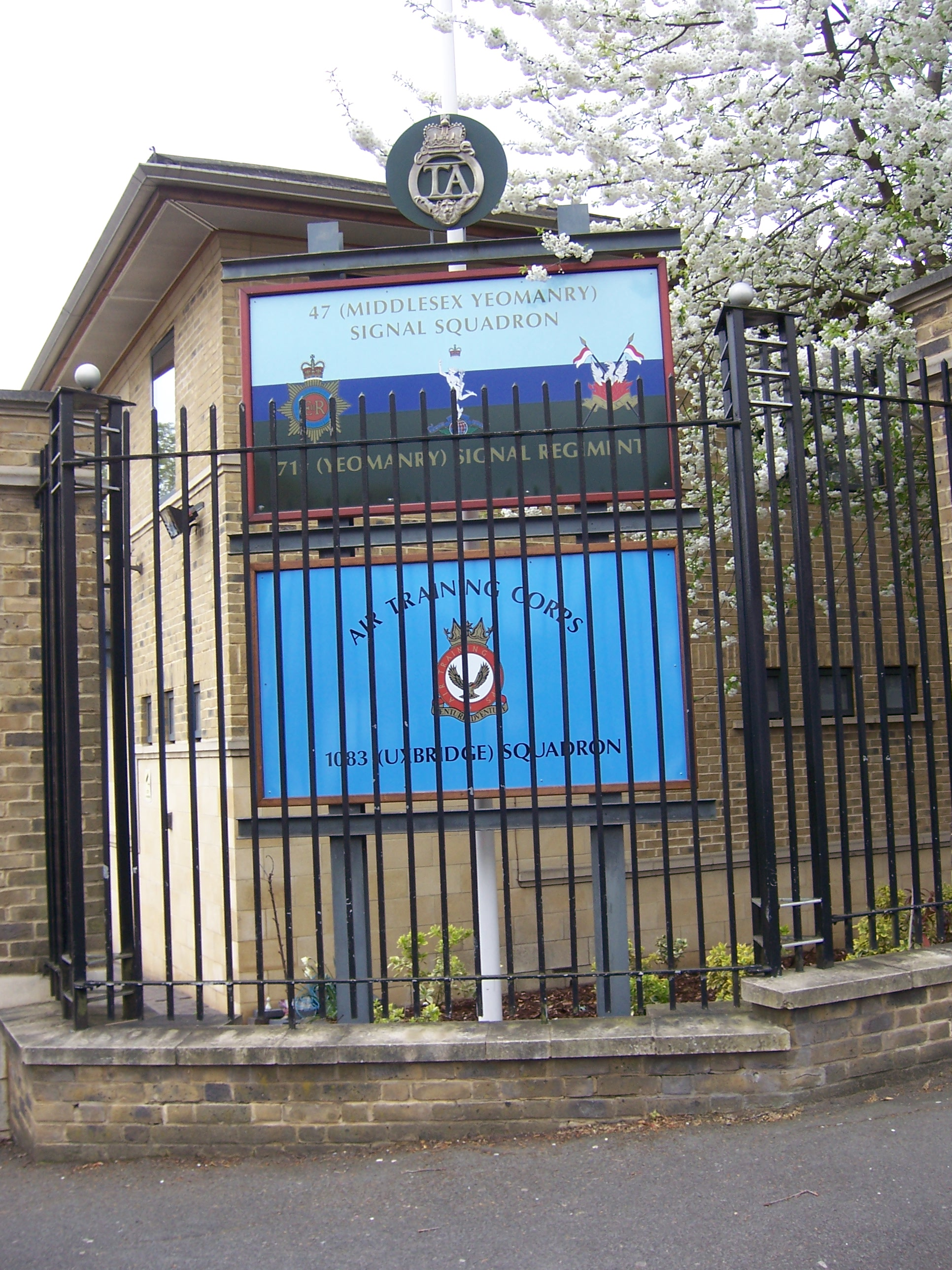
Sign at the headquarters of 31 (Middlesex Yeomanry and Princess Louise's Kensington) Signal Squadron (formerly 47 (Middlesex Yeomanry) Signal Squadron

Postwar the unit initially reformed as 40 Signal Regiment, RCS, but when the TA was reconstituted in 1947 it formed 16th Airborne Divisional Signal Regiment (Middlesex Yeomanry) with RHQ at Uxbridge and four squadrons, together with 22 Armoured Brigade Signal Troop in 56th (London) Armoured Division.

When 16th Division was reduced to a single parachute brigade in 1956 the airborne part of the regiment was similarly reduced to No 3 Sqn (as 44 Independent Parachute Brigade Signal Squadron) while the rest took on general signal duties including a 'Phantom Signals' element. That year the unit's title was changed to Middlesex Yeomanry Signal Regiment, becoming 40 Signal Regiment (Middlesex Yeomanry) in 1959, when 44 Parachute Brigade Squadron was renumbered 305 (Middlesex Yeomanry) Signal Squadron, (Parachute Brigade), and the independent 32 Guards Brigade Signals became 301 (Middlesex Yeomanry) Signal Squadron (Guards Brigade). 22 Armoured Brigade Signals also became 303 Sqn.

The TA was reduced in 1961, when the regiment amalgamated with 47 (London) Signal Regiment to form 47 Signal Regiment (Middlesex Yeomanry), with the Middlesex Yeomanry contributing RHQ, 301 and 305 Sqns, while 303 Sqn went to 57 Signal Regiment. The TA was further reduced in 1967 with the formation of the Territorial and Army Volunteer Reserve (TAVR). The regiment was reduced squadron status as 47 (Middlesex Yeomanry) Signal Squadron in 31 (City of London) Signal Regiment, with Sqn HQ at Harrow, London. At the same time a separate Airhead Signal Unit was formed at Chelsea from 305 Sqn, which was part of the 'Ever Ready' (TAVR Category I) 55 (Thames and Mersey) Signal Squadron. It later regained the 44 Parachute Brigade Signal Troop title.

After the 'Front Line First' defence study, 47 (Middlesex Yeomanry) Sqn moved from 31 (City of London) to 39 (Skinners) Signal Regiment in 1995 and Sqn HQ moved back to Uxbridge It moved again to 71 (City of London) Yeomanry Signal Regiment in 2006. 47 (MY) Sqn was affiliated to the Worshipful Company of Spectacle Makers in the City of London.

The squadron amalgamated with 41 (Princess Louise's Kensington) Signal Squadron to form a new entity, 31 (Middlesex Yeomanry and Princess Louise's Kensington) Signal Squadron, in 2014.

== Uniforms and insignia ==
The full dress uniform of the unit raised in 1830 comprised a green coatee with black facings and turnbacks, brass shoulder scales for other ranks, epaulettes for officers, and gilt buttons inscribed 'U.Y.C.' The coatee was worn with dark blue overalls with scarlet welts (soon afterwards replaced by double scarlet stripes); white trousers were worn in summer until 1841. The headdress was a wide-topped light dragoon shako with black plume and cap-line and a brass Maltese cross with the Coat of arms of Middlesex in the centre. The accoutrements were black sword-belts, carbine belts and pouches, with scarlet and yellow girdles (scarlet and gold for officers). In 1856 the regiment wore a Yeomanry version of the Dragoon helmet with the 1855 pattern double-breasted tunic.

The regiment adopted a Hussar uniform in 1872 but with dark green substituted for the blue of the regular cavalry regiments of that designation; the facings were black, and dark blue overalls were on with double scarlet stripes (gold stripes for officers). The headdress was a Busby with a green bag and green-over-red plume. Equipment was black, and knee-boots were worn when mounted; all ranks had black lambskin saddle covers, and officers' chargers had green jowl-plumes tipped with scarlet. The Middlesex Yeomanry disregarded War Office instructions to adopt silver braiding (the traditional distinction of volunteer units) and in a display of independence added additional gold braiding to their officers' tunics. The group photograph above shows the range of uniforms worn during the 1890s, with relatively plain service and ordinary duty dress the most commonly worn garments.

Khaki uniforms with Slouch hats were laid down for the Imperial Yeomanry after the Second Boer War, but they were allowed coloured facings and plumes. A form of full dress was reinstated in 1905, the Middlesex Yeomanry wearing blue jackets with the slouch hat and khaki drab breeches (blue overalls with yellow/gold stripes when mounted). Slouch hats were replaced by service caps in 1907 (see photo of Major Lafone above). The old full dress was reinstated in 1910, but with the Busby bag changed to scarlet and the overall stripes to yellow for all ranks. The khaki service dress of the regular cavalry was adopted for training and ordinary duties about 1907, becoming the standard uniform worn on all occasions following the outbreak of the First World War.

When the Middlesex Yeomanry converted to Royal Signals they retained their cap badge and wore the brass Royal Corps of Signals shoulder title with 'Y' above to indicate yeomanry. During the Second World War, signals units would have worn the formation badge of their respective HQs as a shoulder flash. Since the Second World War, parachute signal units have worn a 'Drop Zone' (DZ) flash in the RCS colours of white over blue. 16 Airborne Signal Rgt (Middlesex Yeomanry) adopted a non-standard DZ flash with yellow and green vertical stripes over which the red letters TA appeared (the T on the green stripe). 44 Parachute Brigade Signal Sqn and 305 (Middlesex Yeomanry) Parachute Signal Sqn wore the red numbers 44 or 305 on the white over blue DZ flash.

47 (Middlesex Yeomanry) Signal Rgt 1961–67 wore the Middlesex Yeomanry cap and collar badges on battledress, but Royal Signals collar badges on Service Dress or No 1 Dress. The former red-yellow-green shoulder flash of the Middlesex Yeomanry was replaced by an eight-pointed star derived from the divisional flash of the 47th (1/2nd London) Division in the First World War. The regiment had its own system of rank badges: corporals and lance corporals both wore two chevrons with a crown above; sergeants and lance sergeants wore three chevrons with a crown above; staff sergeants and the Squadron Quartermaster Sergeant (SQMS) wore four chevrons and a crown.

47 (Middlesex Yeomanry) Signal Sqn wear a lanyard of parachute cord in dull green and gold to remember their service as airborne signals. The squadron collar badges and buttons are those of the Middlesex Yeomanry, and the squadron has retained Middlesex Yeomanry Stable belts and Side caps. Officers wear a woven wire Middlesex Yeomanry badge with the side cap. The SQMS has the distinction of wearing four chevrons.

== Commanders ==
=== Commanding officers ===
The following officers have commanded the regiment and its successors:

Uxbridge Volunteer Cavalry

- Sir Christopher Baynes, Bt

Middlesex Yeomanry

- Capt, later Lt-Col Hubert de Burgh, 5 January 1831
- Lt-Col Frederick Cox, 3 August 1872
- Lt-Col William H. Harfield, 7 June 1880
- Lt-Col W.H. Mitford, 23 April 1892
- Lt-Col F. Heygate-Lambert, 28 October 1903
- Lt-Col W. Duncan, 28 April 1910

2nd Cavalry Divisional Signals

- Maj W.D. Marcuse, TD, 1920
- Maj A.L. Brodrick, 1921
- Maj H.D. Roberts, MC, TD, 23 February 1929
- Lt-Col G.S. Sale, MC, TD, 1932
- Maj L.F. Messel, 1938

1st Cavalry Divisional Signals

- Lt-Col L.F. Messel, 1939
- Lt-Col Hon S.A. Maxwell, MP, 1941–42

2nd Armoured Divisional Signals

- Lt-Col W.P. Doyle, 1939
- Lt-Col B.B. Kennett, MBE, 1940–41

16th Airborne Divisional Signals

- Lt-Col Viscount Malden, TD, 1947
- Lt-Col N.E. Pease, MBE, TD, 1950
- Lt-Col J.J. Collins, MC, TD

=== Honorary Colonels ===
The following officers have served as Honorary Colonel of the unit:

- Frederick Cox, former CO, appointed 23 March 1878
- FM The Duke of Cambridge, who had given his name to the regiment 10 years earlier, appointed 6 January 1894
- FM Earl Kitchener of Khartoum, appointed 5 July 1910
- Lt-Col Lord Denman, GCMG, KCVO, former officer in 11th Bn IY and Middlesex Imperial Yeomanry, appointed 11 April 1923
- Maj H.D. Roberts, MC, TD, former CO, appointed 6 April 1935
- Brig B.B. Kennett, CBE, former CO
- Lt-Col Reginald Capell, Viscount Malden (later 9th Earl of Essex), TD, former CO, appointed 6 April 1957

== Honours ==
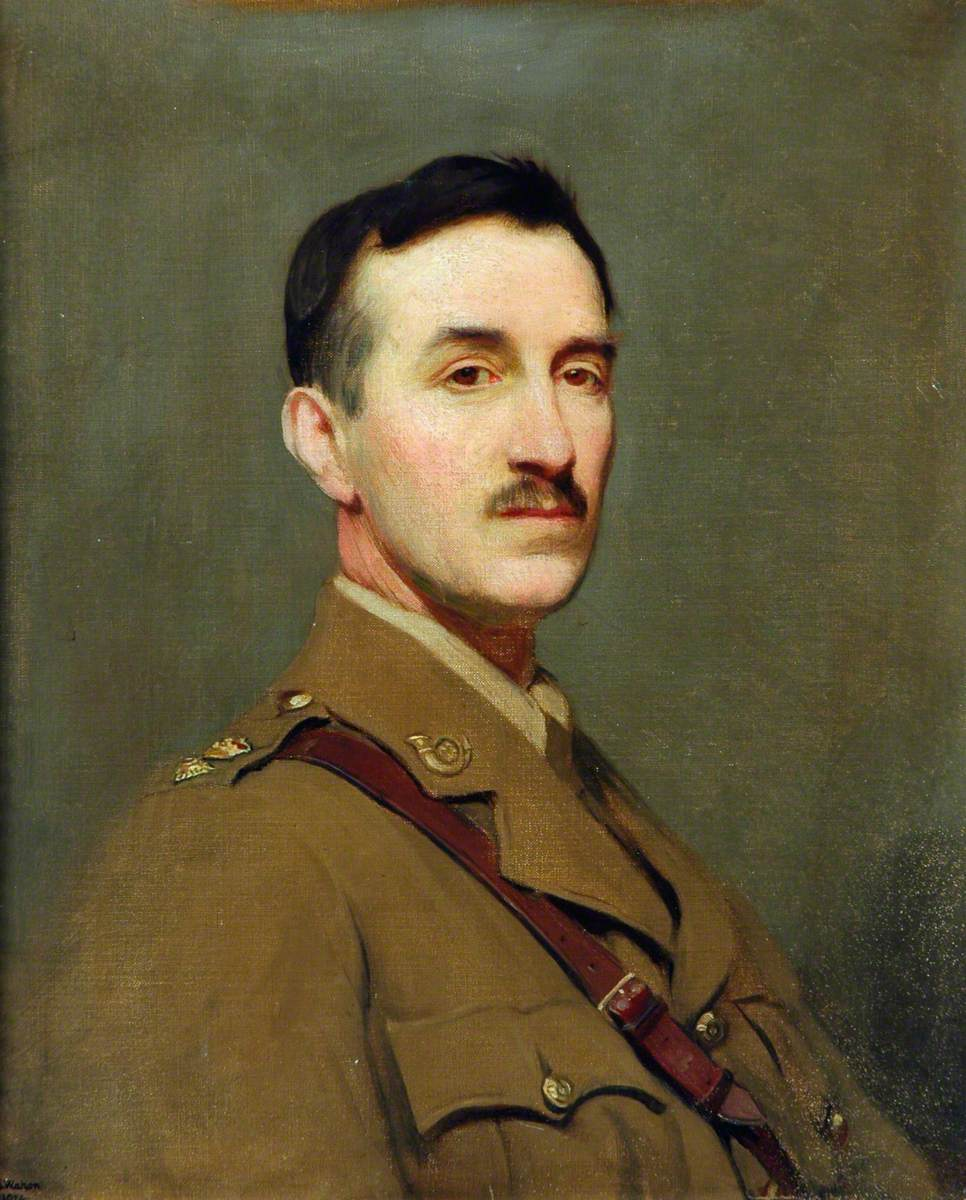
Lt-Col Oliver Watson, depicted in the uniform of the King's Own Yorkshire Light Infantry.

=== Victoria Crosses ===
Major Alexander Malins Lafone was awarded a posthumous Victoria Cross (VC) for his actions at the Battle of el Buqqar Ridge (see above).

Major Oliver Cyril Spencer Watson had been a Regular Army officer seeing action on the North West Frontier and against the Boxer Rebellion. After retiring from the army he joined the Middlesex Yeomanry in 1909, and saw action with the regiment at Gallipoli. After returning to the UK he was attached to the 2/5th Battalion, King's Own Yorkshire Light Infantry on the Western Front. On 28 March 1918 he was commanding the battalion as an acting Lt-Col when he won a posthumous VC leading a counter-attack at Rossignol Wood north of Hebuterne, France. Watson has no known grave and is commemorated on the Arras Memorial, his regiment listed as Middlesex Hussars. The Middlesex Yeomanry consequently lays claim to two of the three Victoria Crosses awarded to the Yeomanry as a whole.

=== Battle honours ===
The Middlesex Yeomanry was awarded the following battle honours (honours in bold were emblazoned on the regimental standard):

| Second Boer War | **South Africa 1900–01** |
| First World War | **Macedonia 1916–17**, **Suvla**, **Scimitar Hill**, **Gallipoli 1915**, Egypt 1915–16, **Gaza**, El Mughar, **Nebi Samwil**, **Megiddo**, **Sharon**, **Damascus**, **Palestine 1917–18** |

Battle honours of Yeomanry regiments are held by their descendant units, irrespective of their current arm or service, even if they (like the Royal Signals) do not themselves display battle honours.

== Memorial ==
The regiment's memorial, designed by Basil Gotto, is in the Nelson Chamber of the crypt of St Paul's Cathedral in the City of London. Unveiled in 1906, the plaque commemorated the 55 members of the Middlesex Yeomanry's Imperial Yeomanry companies who were killed in action in the Second Boer war. Subsequently, flanking panels were added for the First World War, and a panel underneath for the Second World War.

The Church of St Martin-within-Ludgate is the Middlesex Yeomanry's Regimental Chapel; it is the starting point for the regiment's annual Lafone Day service and parade up Ludgate Hill to St Paul's, where a wreath is laid at the memorial in the crypt.

== See also ==
- County of London Yeomanry
- Imperial Yeomanry
- List of Yeomanry Regiments 1908
- Yeomanry
- Yeomanry order of precedence
- British yeomanry during the First World War
- Second line yeomanry regiments of the British Army

== Bibliography ==
- L. S. Amery (ed), The Times History of the War in South Africa 1899-1902, London: Sampson Low, Marston, 6 Vols 1900–09; Appendix to Chapters I-XIV, pp. 503–14.
- Anon, Regimental Badges and Service Caps, London: George Philip & Sons, 1941.
- A. F. Becke,History of the Great War: Order of Battle of Divisions, Part 2a: The Territorial Force Mounted Divisions and the 1st-Line Territorial Force Divisions (42–56), London: HM Stationery Office, 1935/Uckfield: Naval & Military Press, 2007, ISBN 1-847347-39-8.
- A. F. Becke,History of the Great War: Order of Battle of Divisions, Part 2b: The 2nd-Line Territorial Force Divisions (57th–69th), with the Home-Service Divisions (71st–73rd) and 74th and 75th Divisions, London: HM Stationery Office, 1937/Uckfield: Naval & Military Press, 2007, ISBN 1-847347-39-8.
- A. F. Becke,History of the Great War: Order of Battle of Divisions, Part 4: The Army Council, GHQs, Armies, and Corps 1914–1918, London: HM Stationery Office, 1944/Uckfield: Naval & Military Press, 2007, ISBN 1-847347-43-6.
- David L. Bullock, Allenby's War: The Palestine-Arabian Campaigns 1916–1918, London: Blandford Press, 1988, ISBN 0-7137-1869-2.
- Burke's Peerage, Baronetage and Knightage, 100th Edn, London, 1953.
- Basil Collier, History of the Second World War, United Kingdom Military Series: The Defence of the United Kingdom, London: HM Stationery Office, 1957.
- John K. Dunlop, The Development of the British Army 1899–1914, London: Methuen, 1938.
- L.F. Ellis, History of the Second World War, United Kingdom Military Series: Victory in the West, Vol I: The Battle of Normandy, London: HM Stationery Office, 1962/Uckfield: Naval & Military, 2004, ISBN 1-845740-58-0.
- L.F. Ellis, History of the Second World War, United Kingdom Military Series: Victory in the West, Vol II: The Defeat of Germany, London: HM Stationery Office, 1968/Uckfield: Naval & Military, 2004, ISBN 1-845740-59-9.
- Cyril Falls, History of the Great War: Military Operations, Egypt and Palestine, Vol II, From June 1917 to the End of the War, London: HM Stationery Office, 1930/Imperial War Museum and Naval & Military Press, 2013, ISBN 1-84574951-0.
- R. G. Harris, 50 Years of Yeomanry Uniforms London: Frederick Muller, 1972.
- James, E. A. (1978). British Regiments 1914–18. London: Samson Books Limited. ISBN 0-906304-03-2.
- Eric Hunt, Battleground Europe: Normandy: Mont Pinçon, Barnsley: Leo Cooper, 2003, ISBN 0-85052-944-1.
- William Jackson, History of the Second World War, United Kingdom Military Series: The Mediterranean and Middle East, Vol VI: Victory in the Mediterranean, Part I|: June to October 1944, London: HM Stationery Office, 1987/Uckfield, Naval & Military Press, 2004, ISBN 1-845740-71-8.
- William Jackson, History of the Second World War, United Kingdom Military Series: The Mediterranean and Middle East, Vol VI: Victory in the Mediterranean, Part I|I: November 1944 to May 1945, London: HM Stationery Office, 1988/Uckfield, Naval & Military Press, 2004, ISBN 1-845740-72-6.
- Joslen, H. F. (2003) [1960]. Orders of Battle: Second World War, 1939–1945. Uckfield, East Sussex: Naval and Military Press. ISBN 978-1-84342-474-1.
- Rayne Kruger, Goodbye Dolly Gray, London: Cassell 1959/Pan 1974, ISBN 0-330-23861-2.
- T. E. Lawrence, Seven Pillars of Wisdom, London: Jonathan Cape, 1935/Penguin Modern Classics, 1962, ISBN 0-14-001696-1.
- N.B. Leslie, Battle Honours of the British and Indian Armies 1695–1914, London: Leo Cooper, 1970, ISBN 0-85052-004-5.
- Martin Lindsay and Capt M..E. Johnstone, History of 7th Armoured Division June 1943–July 1945, British Army of the Rhine, 1945.
- Cliff Lord & Graham Watson, Royal Corps of Signals: Unit Histories of the Corps (1920–2001) and its Antecedents, Solihull: Helion, 2003, ISBN 1-874622-92-2.
- W. T. Massey, How Jerusalem Was Won: Being the Record of Allenby's Campaign in Palestine, London: Constable, 1919.
- J. F. Maurice, The Campaign of 1882 in Egypt, London: Her Majesty's Stationery Office, 1887/London Stamp Exchange, ca 1984, ISBN 0-948130-00-8.
- Mileham, Patrick (1994). The Yeomanry Regiments; 200 Years of Tradition. Edinburgh: Canongate Academic. ISBN 1-898410-36-4.
- C. J. C. Molony, History of the Second World War, United Kingdom Military Series: The Mediterranean and Middle East, Vol VI: Victory in the Mediterranean, Part I: 1 April to 4 June 1944, London: HM Stationery Office, 1987/Uckfield, Naval & Military Press, 2004, ISBN 1-845740-70-X.
- R. Money Barnes, The Soldiers of London, London: Seeley Service, 1963.
- John North, Gallipoli: The Fading Vision, London: Faber & Faber, 1936.
- Thomas Pakenham, The Boer War, London, Weidenfeld & Nicolson, 1979/abridged edition 1993, ISBN 0-297-83222-0.
- Maj-Gen I.S.O. Playfair, History of the Second World War, United Kingdom Military Series: The Mediterranean and Middle East, Vol I: The Early Successes against Italy (to May 1941), London: HM Stationery Office, 1954/Uckfield, Naval & Military Press, 2004, ISBN 1-845740-65-3.
- Maj-Gen I.S.O. Playfair, History of the Second World War, United Kingdom Military Series: The Mediterranean and Middle East, Vol II: The Germans come to the aid of their Ally (1941), London: HM Stationery Office, 1956/Uckfield, Naval & Military Press, 2004, ISBN 1-845740-66-1.
- I. S. O. Playfair, History of the Second World War, United Kingdom Military Series: The Mediterranean and Middle East, Vol III: (September 1941 to September 1942) British Fortunes reach their Lowest Ebb, London: HM Stationery Office, 1960 /Uckfield, Naval & Military Press, 2004, ISBN 1-845740-67-X
- I. S. O. Playfair & Brig C. J. C. Molony, History of the Second World War, United Kingdom Military Series: The Mediterranean and Middle East, Vol IV: The Destruction of the Axis forces in Africa, London: HM Stationery Office, 1966/Uckfield, Naval & Military Press, 2004, ISBN 1-845740-68-8.
- R. M. P. Preston, The Desert Mounted Corps: An Account of the Cavalry Operations in Palestine and Syria 1917–1918, London: Constable, 1921.
- Purnell's History of the Second World War, London: Purnell, 1969–71.
- Brig N.W. Routledge, History of the Royal Regiment of Artillery: Anti-Aircraft Artillery 1914–55, London: Royal Artillery Institution/Brassey's, 1994, ISBN 1-85753-099-3
- Redford, George; Riches, Thomas (1818). The history of the ancient town and borough of Uxbridge: containing copies of intereseting documents. William Lake.
- Rinaldi, Richard A. (2008). Order of Battle of the British Army 1914. Ravi Rikhye. ISBN 978-0-97760728-0.
- H. C. B. Rogers, The Mounted Troops of the British Army 1066–1945, London: Seeley Service, 1959.
- Lt-Col Ernest Ryan 'Arms, Uniforms and Equipment of the Yeomanry Cavalry', Journal of the Society for Army Historical Research, September 1957, Vol 35, pp. 124–33.
- Lt-Col Ernest Ryan, 'The Post-South African War Yeomanry', Journal of the Society for Army Historical Research, June 1960, Vol 38, pp. 57–62.
- Colin Smith, England's Last War Against France: Fighting Vichy 1940–1942, London: Weidenfeld & Nicolson, 2009, ISBN 978-0-297-85218-6.
- Edward M. Spiers, The Army and Society 1815–1914, London: Longmans, 1980, ISBN 0-582-48565-7.
- Stonham, Charles & Freeman, Benson, (1930). Historical Records of The Middlesex Yeomanry 1797-1927, Regimental Committee, Duke of York's Headquarters, London
- Titles and Designations of Formations and Units of the Territorial Army, London: War Office, 7 November 1927.
- Steve Watt, 'The Imperial Yeomanry, Part 1 – 1900', South African Military History Society, Military History Journal, Vol 13, No 6, December 2006.
- Alan Wakefield and Simon Moody, Under the Devil's Eye: Britain's Forgotten Army at Salonika 1915–1918, Stroud: Sutton, 2004, ISBN 0-7509-3537-5.
- Ray Westlake, British Regiments at Gallipoli, Barnsley: Leo Cooper, 1996, ISBN 0-85052-511-X.
