= Lafone =

Lafone may refer to:

- Alexander Malins Lafone (1870–1917), English recipient of the Victoria Cross
- Alfred Lafone (1821–1911), British leather merchant and Conservative Party politician in London
- Samuel Fisher Lafone (1805-1871), British-born merchant in South America.
