= Battle of Buqqar Ridge =

Battle of the Sinai and Palestine campaign of WWI

Coordinates: 31°12′12.96″N 34°32′6.35″E

Battle of El Buqqar Ridge
- Part of the Middle Eastern theatre of World War I
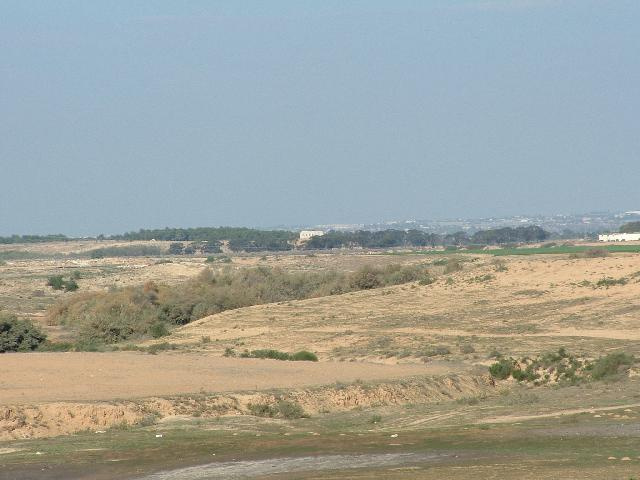
- El Buqqar Ridge.
Date	27 October 1917
Location	El Buqqar (Zeelim), Ottoman Palestine
Result	British victory

Belligerents
British Empire	Ottoman Empire; German Empire

Commanders and leaders
(United Kingdom of Great Britain and Ireland) Philip Chetwode (Australia) Henry Chauvel	(Ottoman Empire) İsmet Bey (German Empire) Erich von Falkenhayn

Units involved
(United Kingdom of Great Britain and Ireland) Egyptian Expeditionary Force: 8th Mounted Brigade; 3rd Light Horse Brigade; one infantry brigade (53rd (Welsh) Division)	(Ottoman Empire) Yildirim Army Group: 125th Regiment (16th Division); Troops (3rd Cavalry Division)

Strength
3 infantry brigades 2 mounted brigades	2 infantry regiments 1 mounted division

Casualties and losses
24 killed 53 wounded 10 missing	10 killed 40 wounded

The Battle of el Buqqar Ridge took place on 27 October 1917, when one infantry regiment and cavalry troops of the Yildirim Army Group, attacked the 8th Mounted Brigade of the Egyptian Expeditionary Force (EEF) in the last days of the stalemate in Southern Palestine during the Sinai and Palestine campaign of World War I.

The commander of the Yildirim Army Group ordered the reconnaissance in force, which greatly outnumbered the Yeomanry in the mounted brigade, holding the outpost line. Despite a large number of casualties, one group made a slight withdrawal to subsequently hold their ground, until reinforcements arrived and the attackers withdrew. However another group of Yeomanry was overwhelmed and killed.

Four days later, two infantry and two mounted divisions launched the EEF's Southern Palestine Offensive, with the Battle of Beersheba on 31 October 1917.

== Background ==
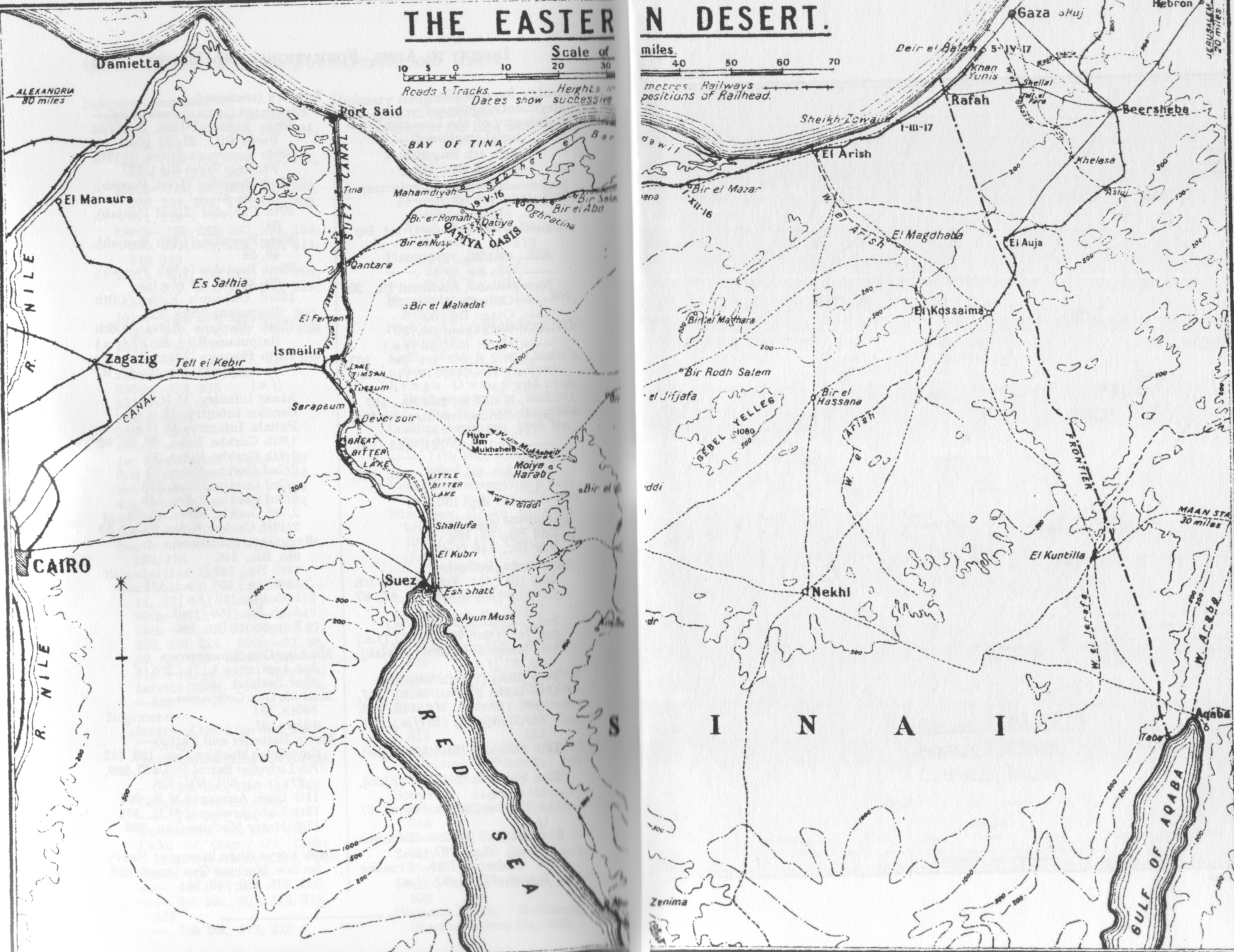
The Eastern Desert (also known as the Negev)

During the six months stalemate following the Second Battle of Gaza, the el Buqqar ridge had been the objective of Desert Column/Desert Mounted Corps strategic marches on 5–7, 10 May and 2–3, 6–7, 14 and 24–5 June. On 19 July, the Anzac Mounted Division with the Australian Mounted Division advanced towards el Buqqar to engage an Ottoman force of two regiments of cavalry supported by infantry and four light guns, occupying the area. The 1st Light Horse Brigade attacked the force capturing 11 prisoners before the Ottoman force withdrew behind entrenchments. One of the prisoner described the attacking force as part of the Ottoman 16th Division which had been protecting a new corps commander while he made a personal reconnaissance. By the next morning the area was clear of Ottoman troops. Ottoman patrols were dispersed from el Buqqar ridge on 21 and 29 September, and on 12–14 October. The 3rd Light Horse Brigade took over from the 5th Mounted Brigade, duties of Outpost Brigade on 16 October when it was noted dawn occurred at 05:00 and dusk at 17:30.

On 18 October the day posts of 3rd Light Horse Brigade were relieved by the 5th Mounted Brigade at 09:00. The Australian Mounted Division with the 7th Mounted Brigade attached was to cover a reconnaissance by officers of the XXI Corps. By 11:50 the 7th Mounted Brigade was holding a line east of Khalasa to Ibn Saiid, the 4th Light Horse Brigade was holding Points 840, 820, 810, 790 and 770 while the 5th Mounted Brigade held points 730, 630, 550 and 300, with the Australian Mounted Divisional headquarters at Khor el Asram and the 3rd Light Horse Brigade in reserve. There was no opposition during the establishment of this line, and indeed Ottoman units "were very quiet all day more so than on any other reconnaissance." At 14:10 Ottoman infantry and cavalry were sighted at Abu Irgeig and Notts battery went into action against them, when two bell tents at Irgeig railway station and station buildings were hit. The outpost line was withdrawn at 17:30 without incident.

== Prelude ==
While the XXI Corps continued to hold the front line south of Gaza, extending eastwards from the Mediterranean Sea, the XX Corps and Desert Mounted Corps held the Wadi Ghazzeh and eastwards. On 21 October the XX Corps' 60th (London) Division defended the Shellal to Karm area with the 53rd (Welsh) Division on their left, while the front line extending into No Man's Land was defended by the Australian Mounted Division based at Tel el Fara with the Anzac Mounted Division in reserve at Abasan el Kebir. During the evening of 21 October, the 179th Brigade (60th Division) and the 2nd Light Horse Brigade (Anzac Mounted Division) moved down the Wadi Ghazzeh to Esani, to develop the water supply in preparation for the advance to Beersheba.

=== 23 October Ottoman attacks ===
At 05:00 a squadron of the Royal Gloucestershire Hussars (RGH), 5th Mounted Brigade, advanced to reoccupy the el Buqqar, Point 720 to Kh Imleih and Point 630 line, when they encountered a squadron of Ottoman soldiers holding el Buqqar, with a second squadron supported by machine guns holding Point 720. Between 05:30 and 06:00 six motor cars, one with eight enemy occupants were seen at Point 720, which retired eastwards when the yeomanry appeared. The leading troop of RGH was charged from the flank, by three Ottoman troops as they approached Point 720. During the attack one man was captured when his horse fell.

The Ottoman soldiers withdrew from el Buqqar at 06:00, when threatened by a yeomanry flanking movement, and machine gun fire. By 07:00 the Ottoman squadron holding Point 720 and rifle pits, was also forced to retreat by a "well executed" converging attack made by two squadrons of Gloucester and Warwickshire Yeomanry, covered by one section of Royal Horse Artillery (RHA). The leading yeomanry troop reached Point 630, just before a squadron of Ottoman soldiers attacked. The Ottoman attackers were driven back from close quarters by yeomanry rifle and Hotchkiss machine gun fire. At the same time as these Ottoman attackers were retiring, one yeomanry troop captured Imleih ridge, but were immediately attacked by three Ottoman troops from the Wadi Hanafish. This Ottoman attack was also stopped, at "short range" by yeomanry rifle and Hotchkiss fire. Both these attacks had been covered by Ottoman high explosive and shrapnel fire, from the direction of Abu Irgeig and north of Bir Ifteis. The Ottoman units suffered at least 17 killed and wounded, while the yeomanry suffered six wounded and one missing.

Two more Ottoman squadrons were seen moving south east of el Buqqar towards Khor el Asram also at 05:00, and a 2nd Light Horse Brigade patrol from Khor el Asram, was fired on by Ottoman soldiers occupying a ridge 8 miles (13 km) north of Point 680. During these operations Ottoman soldiers continued holding a line from Point 820 to Bir Ifteis, while the left of the sector of the Australian Mounted Division's front line remained quiet.

=== 23/4 October permanent outpost line ===
By late October 1917 the EEF outpost line had been pushed forward to an outpost line of low hills/ridge overlooking the Wadi Hanafish. Instead of being held only during the day, this line became permanent from 17:00 on 24 October, when it was to be held day and night to cover the construction of the railway to Karm as it approached Imara. This forward line, established to prevent Ottoman field artillery firing on the railway construction crews, stretched from el Buqqar through Points 720 and 630 to Point 550. It was noted that attack was most likely to occur about dawn, when the el Buqqar line was to form a pivot. If such an attack was successful the Ottoman force was to be "driven off" by an immediate counter-attack, and if the counter-attack was unsuccessful, then all available units were to contribute to a "deliberate and carefully arranged attack" by mounted units, supported by infantry and artillery from el Imara and Esani.

=== 24 to 26 October ===
On 24 October the 53rd (Welsh) Division (XX Corps) concentrated between Hisea and Shellal on the Wadi Ghazzeh in the center of the line. The following night the 158th Brigade (53rd Division) crossed the Wadi Ghazzeh, to arrive at El Imara when it extended its right to the Tel el Fara to Beersheba road, covering the railway extension work to Karm.

On 25 October, the 4th Light Horse Brigade relieved the 3rd Light Horse Brigade on the outpost line, with the 11th Light Horse Regiment holding el Buqqar to Point 600 inclusive. During the evening the New Zealand Mounted Rifle Brigade left El Fukhari on a night march to Esani 15 miles (24 km) away. The brigade remained in the area for three days supporting the yeomanry and providing escorts for camel trains.

During the evening of 26 October, the Australian Mounted Division was at Tel el Fara holding the front line from Shellal to Gamli with the Anzac Mounted Division in reserve at Abasan el Kebir. The Imperial Camel Brigade was at Shellal, the XX Corps concentrated near Shellal, while the Yeomanry Mounted Division was concentrated near Hiseia and Shellal.

=== Attackers ===
General Erich von Falkenhayn, the Commander of the Yildirim Army Group, planned a two phase attack beginning with a reconnaissance in force from Beersheba on 27 October. This was to be followed by an attack on the morning of 31 October 1917, by the Eighth Army from Hareira.

The reconnaissance in force was made by 3,000 Ottoman infantry, 1,200 cavalry, and twelve guns, which advanced from the Kauwukah defences in front of Tel el Sheria, to attack the EEF outpost line. These troops were organised in six infantry battalions, two cavalry squadrons and two artillery batteries. They were the 125th Infantry Regiment (16th Division) from Tel esh Sheria and troops of the 3rd Cavalry Division from Beersheba, commanded by İsmet Bey and included an infantry regiment from the 27th Division and the 125th Field Artillery Battery. Armed with lances, the 3rd Cavalry Division, had served in the Caucasus campaign before transferring to Palestine.

=== Defenders ===
The 8th Mounted Brigade (Yeomanry Mounted Division), (Note: Falls claims 8th Mounted Brigade part of the Australian Mounted Division but according to his order of battle of October 1917 the brigade was part of the Yeomanry Mounted Division. [Falls 1930 Vol. 2 pp. 37–8, p. 661]) temporarily attached to the 53rd (Welsh) Division, relieved the 4th Light Horse Brigade at 17:25 on 26 October, when they took over the 14 miles (23 km)-long outpost line covering the railway construction to Karm.

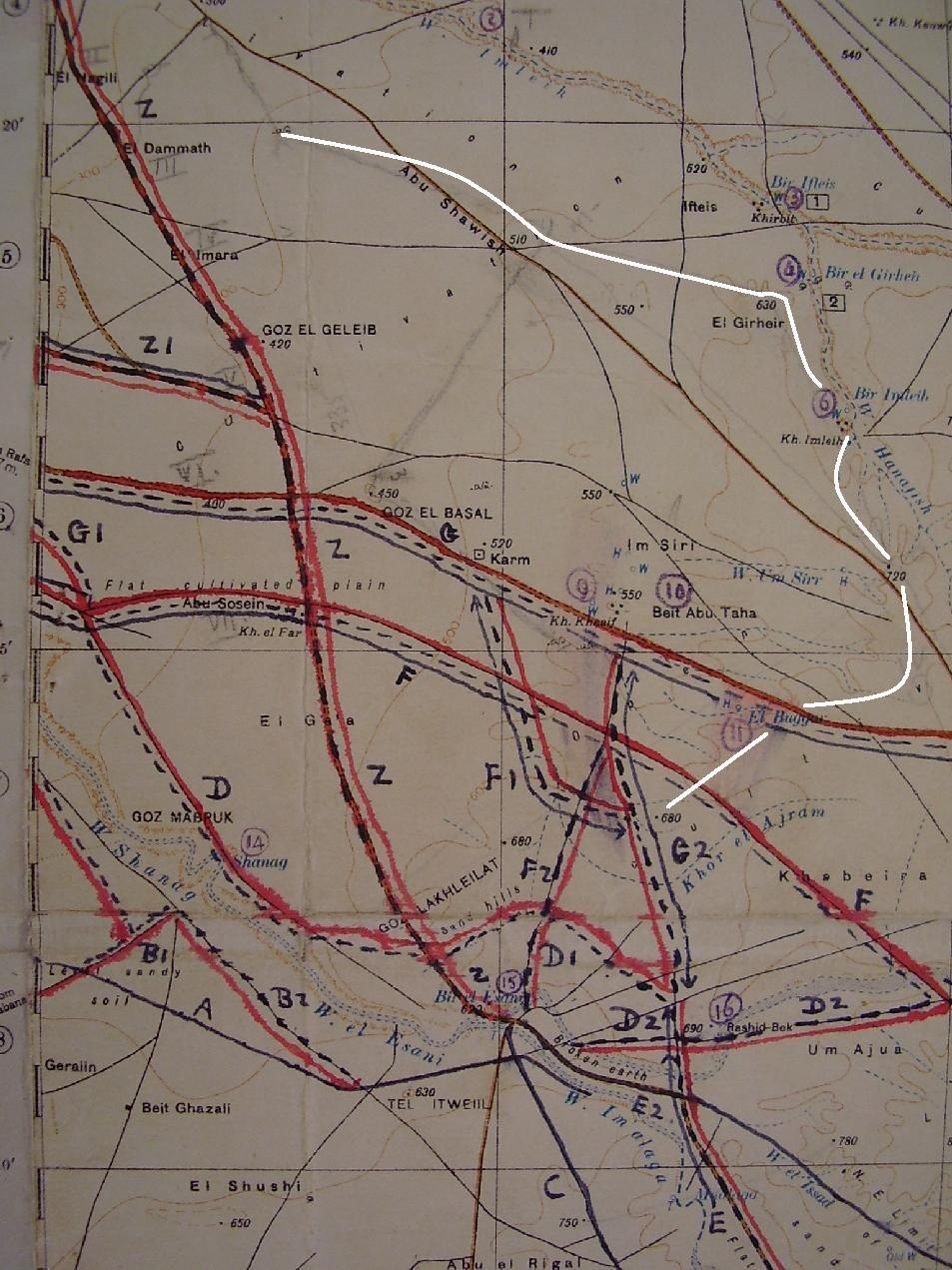
Karm and el Buqqar defensive line (in white)

This line ran from el Buqqar, to Hill 720 and on to Hill 630, stretching along the Wadi Hanafish and the Wadi esh Sheria to a point south of El Mendur. Most of the left section stretching north, was lightly held by standing patrols strongly supported in the rear, by an entrenched infantry brigade of the 53rd (Welsh) Division. However, the 3 miles (4.8 km)-long section on the right, stretching from el Buqqar to the west of Bir Ifteis "was to be held at all costs", supported only by the Hants Battery RHA. (Note: The 14-mile (23 km) long outpost line has been described as not quite reaching the Wadi esh Sheria and ending at Hill 630. [Preston 1921 p. 21]) By the morning of 27 October this outpost line on the long ridge from el Buqqar to Hill 630, was held by the 1st County of London Yeomanry on the right, supported by the 21st Machine Gun Squadron, the 3rd County of London Yeomanry (Sharpshooters) on the left with the City of London Yeomanry (Rough Riders) in reserve north west of Kh. Khasif. One dismounted squadron of the regiment held Hill 630, three troops held Hill 720, and the post on el Buqqar was also garrisoned.

They would be reinforced during the day by the 3rd Light Horse Brigade from the Australian Mounted Division with the 12th Light Armoured Motor Battery, the 158th (North Wales) Brigade and 160th (Wales) Brigade from the 53rd (Welsh) Division, the 229th Brigade from the 74th (Yeomanry) Division, accompanied by the 96th Heavy Artillery group (less 4 batteries) and the British "A" Battery from the 117th Field Artillery Brigade

== Battle ==
=== Point 630 ===
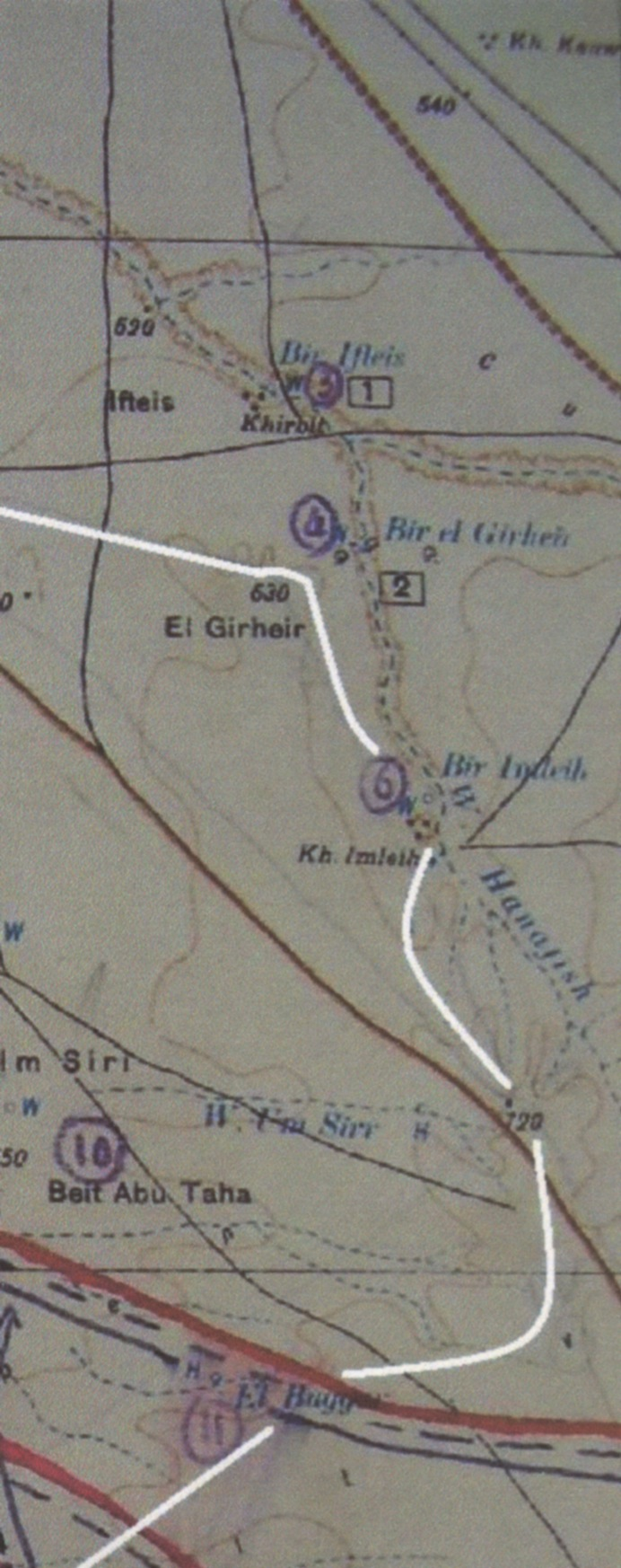
Detail of the el Girheir to el Buqqar defensive line

At 04:10 on Saturday 27 October a post held by the 1st County of London Yeomanry (Middlesex, Duke of Cambridge's) to the west of Bir el Girheir on Point 630 was attacked by an Ottoman cavalry patrol "in great strength." About 05:30 the infantry and cavalry, estimated by a Royal Flying Corps reconnaissance aircraft to be a force of 2,000, attacked the outpost line, becoming heavily engaged on Hill 630, where the attack on both flanks was supported by heavy machine gun and artillery fire. At 06:48, the 8th Mounted Brigade reported Ottoman units attacking Point 630 and a hill 1.5 miles (2.4 km) to the south east, with an infantry battalion of the 158th Brigade (53rd Division) advancing towards Point 630, with one battalion and one battery at Sebil/Point 550. Two troops of 1st County of London Yeomanry (Middlesex, Duke of Cambridge's) ordered forward to the right of the post, advanced through heavy fire to find the post almost surrounded. A squadron of the City of London Yeomanry in reserve advanced, also under heavy fire, to occupy a position 200 yards (180 m) south of the threatened post and stopped the Ottoman forces from completely surrounding it. By 07:55 two, or more camel guns were seen approaching Point 630 from Bir Ifteis while the yeomanry garrisons on Point 630 continued to hold their ground. However, as reinforcements including infantry were fighting their way forward to relieve Point 630 they were heavily fired on about 10:30, causing the reinforcements to fall back. However, by 10:55 the infantry attack began to develop, moving up the slope of Point 630.

Although the defending garrison was driven off Hill 630, the squadron withdrew to "a cruciform trench just below the top of the hill", built by the Australian Mounted Division. The squadron managed to hold out there, during the day against odds of 20 to one when the attackers closed to within 40 yards (37 m) causing four deaths and wounding 14 yeomanry. Fighting continued until late in the afternoon when the 159th Brigade of the 53rd (Welsh) Division was deployed against Point 630 and Kh. Imeih, forcing the Ottoman attackers to withdraw.

=== Point 720 ===
Also at about 04:00 the two troops, from B Squadron, 1st County of London Yeomanry (Middlesex, Duke of Cambridge's) manning the right-hand post north of el Buqqar halfway to Kh and with orders to hold at all costs, was attacked by several Ottoman cavalry squadrons, "sweeping round its right", which forced the Hants Battery near Kh. Khasif to withdraw. Heavy rifle and machine gun fire with occasional artillery shells was reported at 06:55 being targeted on the yeomanry garrison on el Buqqar ridge, and at 07:55 they were continuing to hold their ground on Point 720. (Note: While at Esani on 27 October, a patrol from the Anzac Mounted Division, reported hearing heavy firing to the north east of Esani at 06:15. [Anzac Mounted Division War Diary October 1917 AWM4-1-60-20]) The 3rd Light Horse Brigade (Australian Mounted Division) was ordered at 08:20 to move to the east side of the Wadi Ghuzzee at Gamli at once, coming under orders of the 53rd (Welsh) Division, when the light horsemen were to assist the Yeomanry to hold Point 720 until infantry reinforcements arrived at about 13:00. Two hours later, as one infantry brigade, two squadrons of cavalry and two batteries were attacking Ottoman forces as they moved towards Points 720 and 630 they were heavily shelled at 10:30 causing the reinforcements to fall back. However, the original garrison on Point 720, which had not been in communication since 06:00, continued holding their position, although by then they were almost totally surrounded.

The final attack on Hill 720 by 1,200 Ottoman cavalry was supported by machine-gun and artillery fire. After six hours and two unsuccessful mounted charges, a third combined cavalry charge and infantry attack, captured the hill. All the defenders, commanded by Major Alexander Malins Lafone who would be awarded a Victoria Cross for this action, were killed or wounded except three. As the 9th Light Horse Regiment (3rd Light Horse Brigade) was fighting their way towards el Buqqar and Point 720, at 11:35, the 8th Mounted Brigade reported by phone to the Australian Mounted Divisional headquarters, that the advance by the infantry brigade towards Point 720 was proceeding, but that the garrison on Point 720 had been "presumably wiped out", as Ottoman soldiers were seen riding over the top of the hill. (Note: Major Alexander Malins Lafone 1st County of London Yeomanry (Middlesex, Duke of Cambridge's), won a posthumous Victoria Cross for encouraging his men to resist the Ottoman attack.)

The 12th Light Armoured Motor Battery was ordered to support the 3rd Light Horse Brigade advance against Point 720. By 14:10 the 9th Light Horse Regiment was reported to be advancing with its right on the cross roads at Taweil el Habari and its left on El Buqqar, with two squadrons of the 10th Light Horse Regiment on their right, facing east within sight. When the 9th Light Horse Regiment had been held up at 13:45 by machine gun fire from Point 820, the 1/1st Nottinghamshire Royal Horse Artillery came into action, against the Ottoman fire. The 3rd Light Horse Brigade reported to the Australian Mounted Division at 14:37 that Ottoman forces were holding Point 720 on a front 1 mile (1.6 km) long, "in strength." By 15:05 the 9th Light Horse Regiment, conforming to infantry moves, had advanced to within 1 mile (1.6 km) of Point 720. At 08:35 further infantry reinforcements had been expected to arrive at about 13:00, however they didn't arrive until 16:35 when the 229th Brigade (74th Division) was reported advancing on the left flank of the 3rd Light Horse Brigade, causing considerable Ottoman movements on Point 820. By 17:10 an Ottoman position defended by four machine guns and 400 infantry defending Point 820, was reconnoitred by the armoured cars attached to the light horsemen, which drove to just east of the cross roads east of el Buggar, reporting the 53rd (Welsh) Division deployments of the 159th Brigade against Point 630 and Kh. Imleih, the 160th Brigade opposing Point 720 and the 229th Brigade opposing el Buqqar ridge. At 18:00 the 8th Mounted Brigade's reserve regiment was still holding the line when the 3rd Light Horse Brigade supported by 1/1st Nottinghamshire RHA counter-attacked along with two infantry brigades of the 53rd (Welsh) Division and the Ottoman forces retired during the evening. The yeomanry lost 24 killed and 53 wounded with 10 missing. At 18:50 the 9th Light Horse Regiment reported their patrol reached Point 720 to find 14 dead yeomanry, that the Ottoman forces had dug substantial trenches in the area, and that the 53rd Division had not yet reached them.

An officer's patrol from the 9th Light Horse Regiment at 18:00 established that the Ottoman forces had withdrawn from their positions on Point 720 which allowed the Allied forces to re-occupy El Buggar Ridge without further casualties. That night 229th Brigade relieved the 3rd Light Horse Brigade at 20:10. (Note: 1:20,000 scale maps of the El Buggar Ridge area can be found at Australian Light Horse Studies Centre and maps of the El Buqqar Ridge area.)

== Aftermath ==
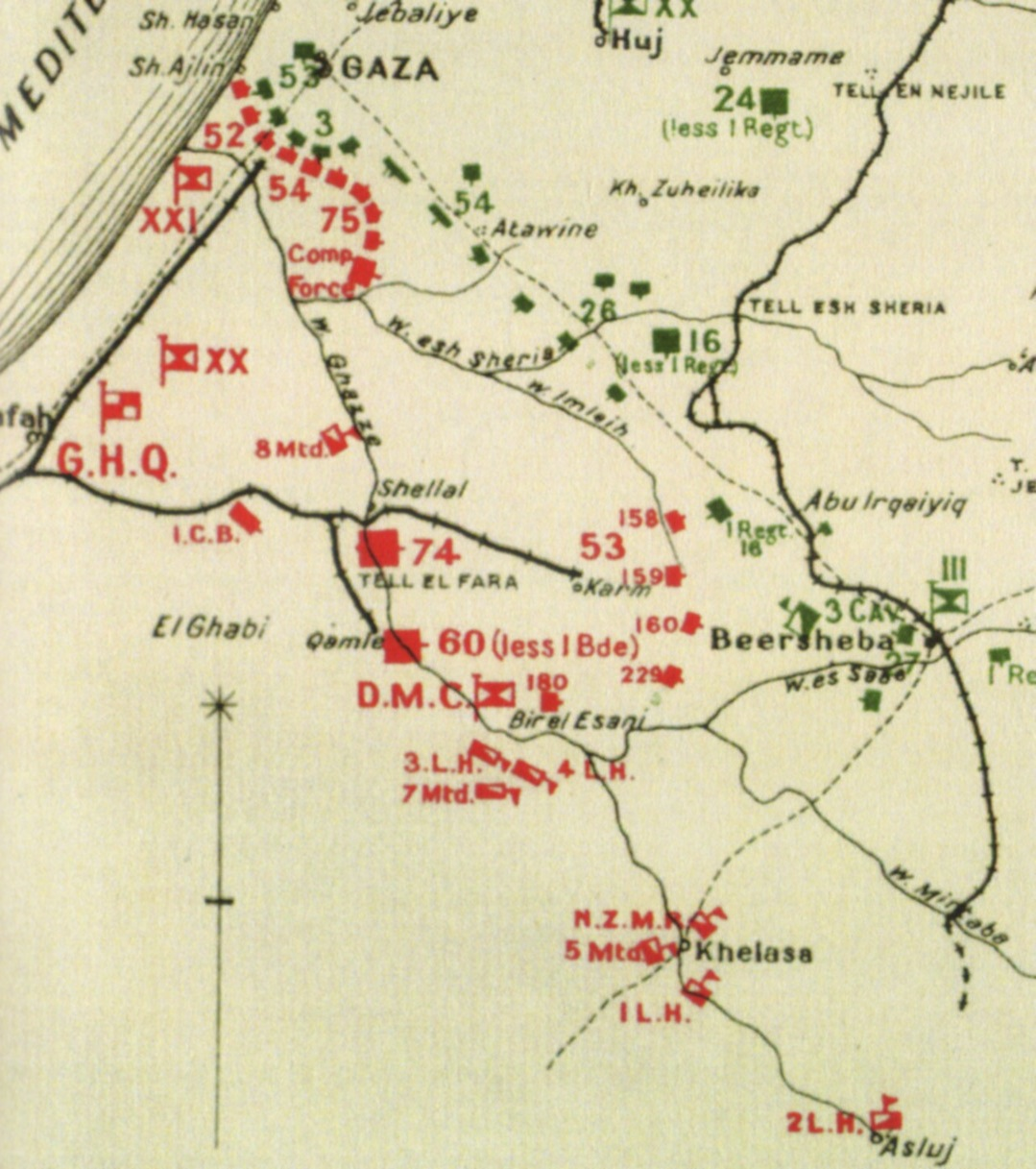
Deployments of Yildirim Army Group (green) and EEF (red) on 28 October 1917

The 8th Mounted Brigade rejoined the Yeomanry Mounted Division on 28 October, the 3rd Light Horse Brigade arriving back in camp at 24:00.

Units of the Egyptian Labour Corps moved forward from Shellal to complete the water pipeline to Karm, and to uncovered their camouflaged work on the railway east of the Wadi Ghuzzee. They completed the railway to Karm on 28 October when the station was opened, two days ahead of schedule.

By 30 October the concentration of the EEF force was complete for the attack on Beersheba the next day.

Von Falkenhayn ordered the Eighth Army to launch an attack from Hareira "southwards" on 31 October. The size of the force, and its objectives are unknown, nor does the commander of the Eighth Army, Kress von Kressenstein mention the order to attack.
