= County of London Yeomanry =

British Army regiment

Several British Army regiments have borne the title County of London Yeomanry (CLY). Most have been mounted, then armoured regiments.

== 1st County of London Yeomanry (Middlesex, Duke of Cambridge's) ==
The 1st County of London Yeomanry was a volunteer cavalry regiment originally raised in 1797. It saw action in the Second Boer War, in the First World War and in the Second World War. Its lineage is maintained by 31 (Middlesex Yeomanry and Princess Louise's Kensington) Signal Squadron, Royal Corps of Signals.

== 2nd County of London Yeomanry (Westminster Dragoons) ==
The 2nd County of London Yeomanry (Westminster Dragoons) was a volunteer cavalry regiment originally raised in 1779. It also saw action in the Second Boer War, in the First World War and in the Second World War. Its lineage is maintained by F Squadron, the Royal Yeomanry.

== 3rd County of London Yeomanry (Sharpshooters) ==
The 3rd County of London Yeomanry (Sharpshooters) was a volunteer cavalry regiment originally raised in 1901. It also saw action in the Second Boer War, in the First World War and in the Second World War. It amalgamated to form the 3rd/4th County of London Yeomanry (Sharpshooters) in 1944.

== 4th County of London Yeomanry ==
The 4th County of London Yeomanry was a volunteer cavalry regiment originally raised in 1901. It saw action in the Second Boer War and in the First World War and was disbanded in 1924.

== 4th County of London Yeomanry (Sharpshooters) ==
The 4th County of London Yeomanry (Sharpshooters) was a volunteer cavalry regiment originally raised in 1939. It saw action in the Second World War and it was then amalgamated to form the 3rd/4th County of London Yeomanry (Sharpshooters) in 1944.

== 3rd/4th County of London Yeomanry (Sharpshooters) ==
The 3rd/4th County of London Yeomanry (Sharpshooters) was a volunteer cavalry regiment formed through amalgamation in 1944. It was amalgamated with the Kent Yeomanry – descended from the Royal East Kent Yeomanry and the Queen's Own West Kent Yeomanry – to form the Kent and County of London Yeomanry (Sharpshooters) in 1961.

== Kent and County of London Yeomanry (Sharpshooters) ==
The Kent and County of London Yeomanry (Sharpshooters) was a volunteer cavalry regiment formed through amalgamation in 1961. Its lineage is maintained by a pair of squadrons:

- C (Kent & Sharpshooters Yeomanry) Squadron, Royal Yeomanry
- 265 (Kent and County of London Yeomanry) Support Squadron (Sharpshooters), Royal Signals

== See also ==
- City of London Yeomanry (Rough Riders)
