= Battle of Groenkop =

1901 battle of the Second Boer War

- Part of the Second Boer War
| Date | 25 December 1901 |
| Location | Groenkop, Orange Free State 28°14′11″S 28°39′28″E |
| Result | Boer victory |

Belligerents
| United Kingdom | Orange Free State |

Commanders and leaders
| Major Williams | Christiaan de Wet |

Strength
| 550 (mostly 11th Battalion Imperial Yeomanry) | 600 |

Casualties and losses
| 68 killed 77 wounded 206 captured | 11 killed 30 wounded |

In the Battle of Groenkop (Battle of Tweefontein) on 25 December 1901, Head Commandant Christiaan de Wet's Boer commando surprised and defeated a force of Imperial Yeomanry under the command of Major Williams.

== Background ==
By late 1901, de Wet's guerilla force based itself near the settlements of Lindley, Bethlehem and Reitz in the northeast part of the Orange Free State. On 28 November, de Wet called a krijgsraad (war council) of the still-active Boer leaders near Reitz. They determined to strike back at their British tormentors, who numbered 20,000 men.

As part of Lord Kitchener's strategy, the British constructed lines of blockhouses and barbed wire across the veld. The blockhouse lines were designed to restrict the movements of the Boer guerillas so they could be trapped by British mobile columns. One line of blockhouses reached from Harrismith to the Tradoux farm, 25 miles (40 km) east of Bethlehem. To protect the construction, Major General Sir Leslie Rundle deployed four dispersed forces. Rundle with 330 men and one gun guarded the wagon road; the end of the blockhouse line was held by 150 infantry; a 400-man regiment of the Imperial Light Horse lay 13 miles (21 km) to the east at Elands River Bridge; Major Williams with 550 men, mostly of the 11th Battalion, Imperial Yeomanry, a 15-pounder gun and a pom-pom held the 200-foot (61 m) high Groenkop.

== Battle ==
De Wet carefully scouted the Groenkop position for three days. He noted that the British posted their sentries atop the sheer west side of the kop, instead of at the bottom where they could give timely warning of an attack. The Boer leader determined to scale the west side using the trace of a gully.

At 2:00 am on Christmas morning, de Wet's commando clambered up the steep slope in single file with their boots removed so as to minimise any noise. The surprise was nearly total. Challenged by a single sentry when they were over halfway to the top with a few scattered shots, the Boers, who were ordered into battle by de Wet shouting "Stormt Burgers" swarmed up and over the crest. They began firing downhill into the British tents, inflicting a "massacre." Savage fighting lasted about 40 minutes before the British gave up.

== Aftermath ==
The next morning, one of the 206 British prisoners of the Boers noted that his foes were so short of clothing that some wore women's attire. The 250 unwounded British prisoners of war were stripped literally naked before they were turned loose the next day. Kitchener wrote, "It is very sad and depressing that the boers are able to strike such blows, but I fear ... we shall always be liable to something of the sort from the unchecked rush of desperate men at night."

By 5 February 1902, Kitchener's blockhouse lines were completed and he sent 9,000 men on a massive sweep through the countryside. In this first operation, 285 Boers were captured but de Wet and President Marthinus Steyn and their men escaped the trap. The second drive lasted from 16 February to 28. Again, de Wet got away, but this time he had to abandon most of his cattle. On 27 February, Colonel Henry Rawlinson's column encircled and captured a 650-man Boer commando at Lang Reit, a few miles from Tweefontein. This brought the British "bag" in the successful sweep to 778 surrendered Boers. The third drive by Major Elliott's division, from 4 March to 11 March, was a failure, with only about 100 Boers captured. Worse, de Wet escaped to join Fighting General Koos de la Rey in the Western Transvaal.

== Bibliography ==
- Evans, Martin Marix. The Boer War: South Africa 1899-1902. Oxford: Osprey, 1999. ISBN 1-85532-851-8
- Pakenham, Thomas. The Boer War. New York: Avon Books, 1979. ISBN 0-380-72001-9
