= Alexander Lafone =

Alexander Malins Lafone
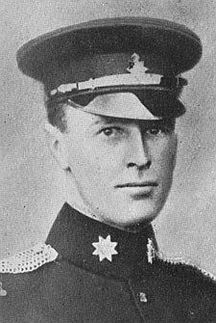
- Born: 19 October 1870; Liverpool, United Kingdom
- Died: 27 October 1917 (aged 47); Buggar Ridge, Zeelem, Palestine
- Burial place: Beersheba War Cemetery
- Military career
- Allegiance: United Kingdom
- Branch: British Army
- Rank: Major
- Nickname: "Laffy"
- Units: Imperial Yeomanry; 1/1st County of London Yeomanry (Middlesex, Duke of Cambridge's Hussars)
- Conflicts: Second Boer War; World War I: Sinai and Palestine campaign; Battle of Buqqar Ridge (DOW)
- Awards: Victoria Cross

Major Alexander Malins Lafone, VC (19 August 1870 – 27 October 1917) was an English British Army officer and a recipient of the Victoria Cross, the highest and most prestigious award for gallantry in the face of the enemy that can be awarded to British and Commonwealth forces.

== Background ==
Lafone was educated at Dulwich College. He was commissioned a second lieutenant in the Middlesex Yeomanry (Duke of Cambridge's Hussars) on 14 August 1901, fought in the Second Boer War in various regiments, and was invalided in 1901. He was promoted to lieutenant on 27 September 1902. He then stayed on in Africa working for the Colonial Office as an Assistant Resident in Northern Nigeria. Recurrent attacks of fever forced him back to England where he worked and kept up his connections with the Army.

== Victoria Cross ==
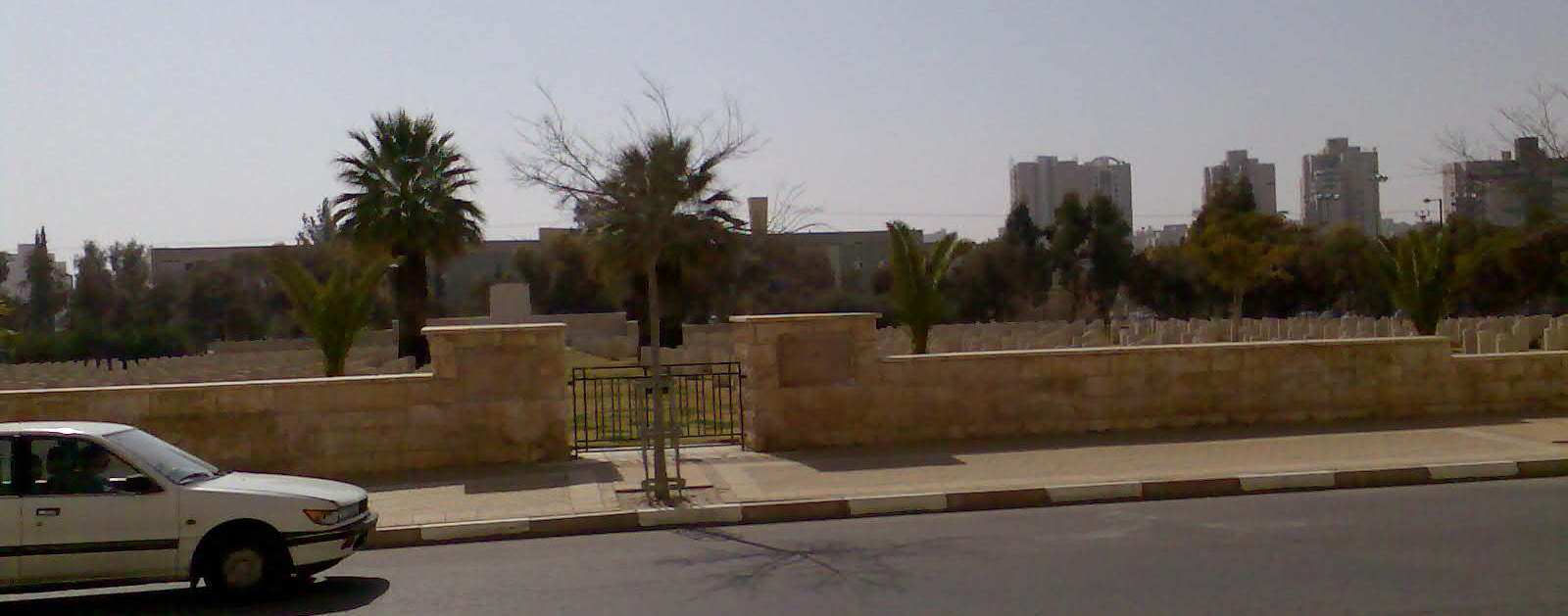
The Beersheba Commonwealth War Graves Cemetery where the casualties from El Buggar are buried

His citation from the London Gazette reads:

Maj. Alexander Malins Lafone, late Yeo. For most conspicuous bravery, leadership and self-sacrifice when holding a position for over seven hours against vastly superior enemy forces. All this time the enemy were shelling his position heavily, making it very difficult to see. In one attack, when the enemy cavalry charged his flank, he drove them back with heavy losses. In another charge they left fifteen casualties within twenty yards of his trench, one man, who reached the trench, being bayoneted by Maj. Lafone himself. When all his men, with the exception of three, had been hit and the trench which he was holding was so full of wounded that it was difficult to move and fire, he ordered those who could walk to move to a trench slightly in the rear, and from his own position maintained a most heroic resistance. When finally surrounded and charged by the enemy, he stepped into the open and continued the fight until he was mortally wounded and fell unconscious. His cheerfulness and courage were a splendid inspiration to his men, and by his leadership and devotion he was enabled to maintain his position, which he had been ordered to hold at all costs.

== Bibliography ==
- Gliddon, Gerald (2005). The Sideshows. VCs of the First World War. Sutton Publishing. ISBN 978-0-7509-2084-1.
- Murphy, James (2008). Liverpool VCs. Pen and Sword Books. ISBN 978-1844157808.
- Ingleton, Roy (2011). Kent VCs. Pen and Sword Books. ISBN 978-1848844094.
