= Baynes baronets =

Baronetcy in the Baronetage of the United Kingdom

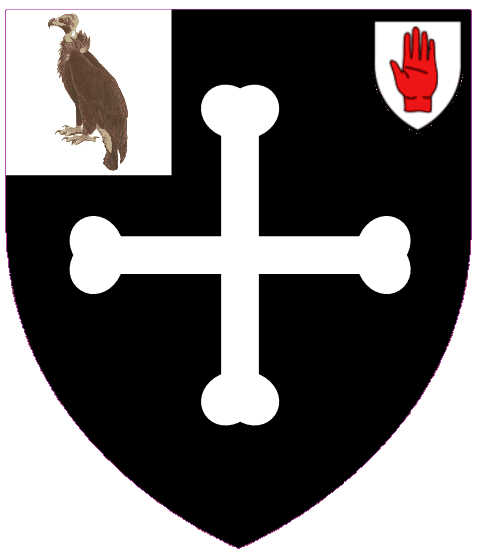
- Crest: A cubit arm vested Azure cuffed erminois the hand holding a jawbone Argent.
- Shield: Sable a shin-bone in fess surmounted of another in pale Argent on a canton of the last a vulture Proper.
- Supporters: On either side a savage wreathed with holly about the head and waist holding a club over his exterior shoulder all Proper.
- Motto: Furor Arms Ministrat

The Baynes Baronetcy, of Harefield Place in the County of Middlesex, is a title in the Baronetage of the United Kingdom. It was created on 29 June 1801 for Christopher Baynes. He was Major-Commandant of the Uxbridge Gentlemen and Yeomanry Cavalry, which he helped to raise. The title descended from father to son until the death of his great-great-grandson, the fifth Baronet, in 1971. The late Baronet died unmarried and was succeeded by his first cousin, the sixth Baronet. He was the son of Reverend Malcolm Charles Baynes, fourth son of the third Baronet. As of 2023 the title is held by his grandson, the eighth Baronet, who succeeded his father in 2005.

== Baynes baronets, of Harefield Place (1801) ==
- Sir Christopher Baynes, 1st Baronet (1755–1837)
- Sir William Baynes, 2nd Baronet (1789–1866)
- Sir William John Walter Baynes, 3rd Baronet (1820–1897).
- Sir Christopher William Baynes, 4th Baronet (1847–1936)
- Sir William Edward Colston Baynes, 5th Baronet, MC (1876–1971)
  - Donald Stuart Baynes (1848–1932), 2nd son of the 3rd Baronet, died without male issue
  - Roderick Walter Baynes (1852–1944), 3rd son of the 3rd Baronet, died unmarried
  - Reverend Malcolm Charles Baynes (1853–1941), 4th son of the 3rd Baronet
- Lieutenant Colonel Sir Rory Malcolm Stuart Baynes, 6th Baronet (1886–1979), eldest son of Reverend Malcolm Baynes
- Lieutenant Colonel Sir John Christopher Malcolm Baynes, 7th Baronet (1928–2005). Simon Baynes is his son.
- Sir Christopher Rory Baynes, 8th Baronet (born 1956)

The heir apparent to the baronetcy is Alasdair William Merriman Baynes (born 1993).

== Notes ==
Baronetage of the United Kingdom
Preceded by Welby baronets	Baynes baronets of Harefield Place; 29 June 1801	Succeeded by Barrett-Lennard baronets
