= List of orders of battle for the British 1st Armoured Division =

Mobile Division 1st Armoured Division 1st British Armoured Division
- The second variant of the divisional rhinoceros insignia, used from 1942–1945.
- Active: 1937–1945
- Country: United Kingdom
- Branch: British Army
- Engagements: Second World War

An order of battle is a list of the elements of a military formation that are organised within a hierarchical command structure. It can provide information on the strength of that formation and the equipment used. An order of battle is not necessarily a set structure and it can change depending on tactical or strategic developments or the evolution of military doctrine. For example, a division could be radically altered from one campaign to another through the adding or removing of sub-units but retain its identity and history. The size of a division can dramatically vary as a result of the forces assigned and the doctrine employed at that time.

The 1st Armoured Division of the British Army was formed in 1937 as the Mobile Division and renamed the 1st Armoured Division in April 1939. The division was dispatched with 257 tanks to fight in the Battle of France. After several costly engagements and the collapse of the Allied effort, it was forced to retreat back to the UK with only 13 remaining tanks. In late 1941, the division was sent to reinforce the British effort in North Africa with 184 tanks. It then fought in all the major engagements of the Western Desert campaign during 1942 from defeat in the Battle of Gazala to victory in the Second Battle of El Alamein. It assisted in the chase of the Axis powers across North Africa into Tunisia, culminating with the Axis' overall defeat on the continent. In the aftermath of the Tunisian campaign, the division remained in Africa until 1944, when it was transferred to Italy. Its final battles were against the German Gothic Line during the Italian campaign. The division was broken up in October 1944 to provide reinforcements for other active formations due to a personnel shortage in the British Army, and officially disbanded in early 1945.

== Background ==
The Mobile Division was formed in November 1937, and renamed the 1st Armoured Division in April 1939. Prior to the outbreak of the Second World War, doctrine called for such a division to be composed of two armoured brigades—each with three armoured regiments—and a support group. The support group included all required supporting arms the division would need: infantry, engineers, artillery, and anti-tank and anti-aircraft guns. At full strength, the support group would have sixteen 25-pounder field gun-howitzers, twenty-four 2-pounder anti-tank gun, and twenty-four Bofors 40 mm (1.6 in) anti-aircraft guns. On paper, the division would contain 108 light tanks, 159 light cruisers, 58 heavy cruisers, and 24 close-support tanks, and have 9,442 personnel. This basic organisation changed on numerous occasions during the war, although the actual implementation could be delayed due to several factors.

British forces defined light tanks as reconnaissance vehicles, which were armed with machine guns. Cruiser tanks were swiftly moving, more heavily armoured, and equipped with machine guns and an anti-tank gun. The cruiser tank's role was to engage and destroy enemy armoured forces. Its main weapon, a 2-pounder anti-tank gun, was supplied only with armour-piercing rounds, meaning cruiser tanks were ineffective against entrenched infantry or suppressing hostile artillery. The A9 is an example of a light cruiser while the A10 provides an example of a heavy cruiser. The light and heavy definitions arose in 1938, to differentiate between cruisers that were thinly armoured and their better armoured variants (for example, the A9 frontal armour was only 14 mm (0.55 in) thick compared to the 30 mm (1.2 in) thickness of the A10). Rather than being fitted with an anti-tank gun, close-support cruiser tanks were equipped with a howitzer for firing smoke and high-explosive rounds, and were not intended to fight other tanks.

== From formation through to the outbreak of the Second World War ==
On formation, in November 1937, the division was headquartered at Andover, Hampshire, on the edge of Salisbury Plain and was assigned to Southern Command. Two of its brigades were located around the plain: the 2nd Cavalry Brigade at Tidworth Camp and the 1st Tank Brigade at Perham Down. While the 1st Cavalry Brigade was technically part of the division, it was located at Aldershot under the command of Aldershot Command until late 1938.

It was intended for the division to have 620 armoured fighting vehicles, although did not reach this strength during the early years of its existence. As best they could be, the cavalry regiments were outfitted with the Light Tank Mk VI while the tank brigade contained Vickers Medium Mark IIs. Due to the lack of tanks, trucks were used to simulate their existence for training purposes. It was not until December 1938 that the first delivery of A13 cruiser tanks were made, followed by A9s in January 1939. In April 1939, several nomenclature changes took place. The Mobile Division was renamed the 1st Armoured Division, the cavalry brigades were retitled as light armoured brigades, and the tank brigade became the heavy armoured brigade. Likewise, on 4 April 1939, the Royal Armoured Corps was formed to command all mechanised cavalry and the battalions of the Royal Tank Corps. The latter was renamed the Royal Tank Regiment and its nomenclature colloquially changed; each unit dropped the word battalion from its title, although this was not officially adopted until September 1945.

=== November 1937– July 1938 ===
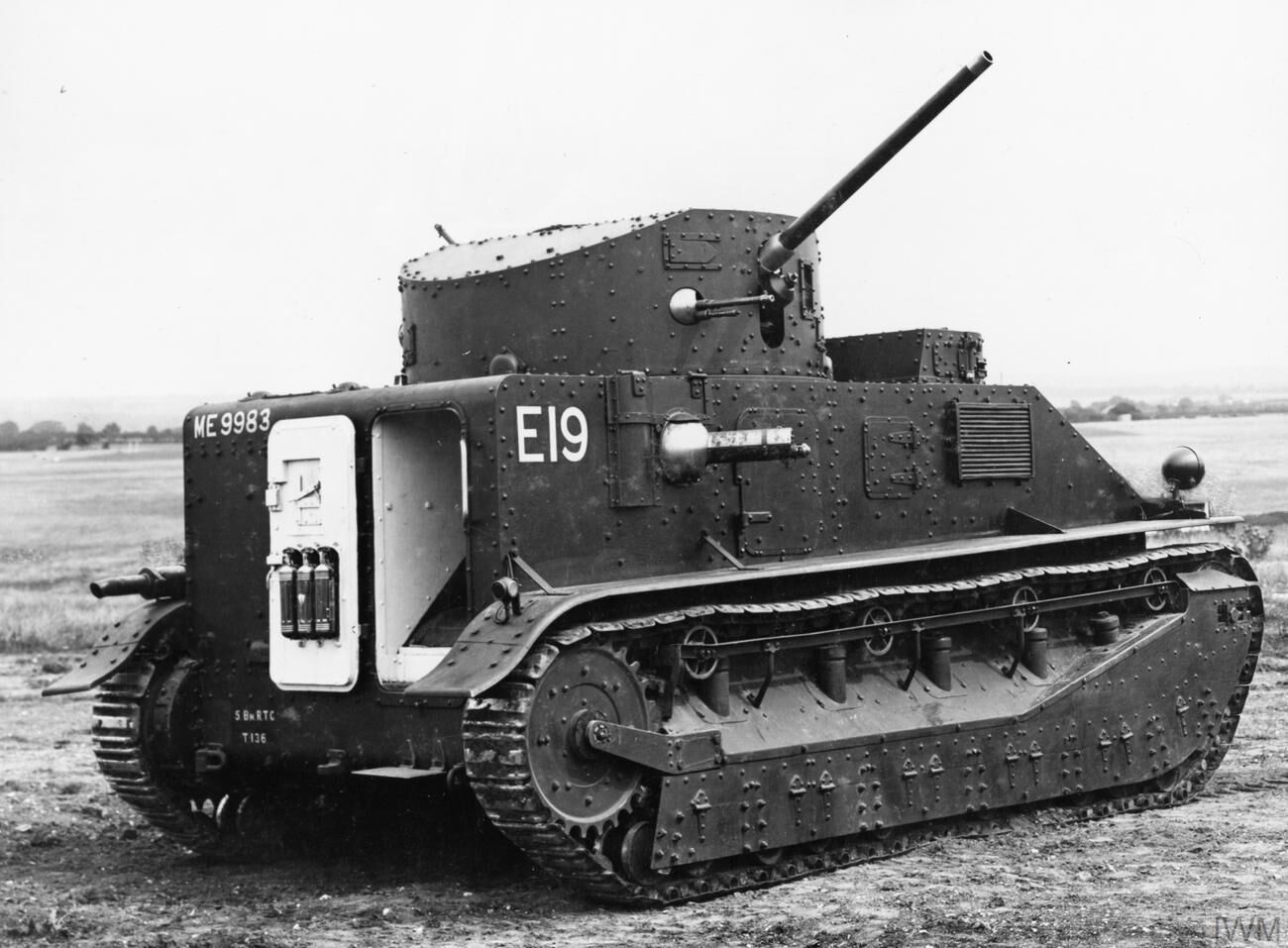
An example of the Vickers Medium Mark II, which the Tank Brigade was equipped with

Mobile Division

1st Cavalry Brigade

- King's Dragoon Guards
- 4th Queen's Own Hussars
- 2nd Battalion, King's Royal Rifle Corps
- Mobile Divisional Signals, Royal Corps of Signals
  - HQ, B, C, and D Troops
- 1st Brigade, Royal Horse Artillery
  - A, B, and I Batterys

2nd Cavalry Brigade

- 2nd Dragoon Guards (Queen's Bays)
- 9th Queen's Royal Lancers
- 1st Battalion, Rifle Brigade
- Mobile Divisional Signals, Royal Corps of Signals
  - E and F Troops

1st Tank Brigade

- 1st Light Battalion, Royal Tank Corps (until about April 1938)
- 2nd Battalion, Royal Tank Corps
- 3rd Battalion, Royal Tank Corps
- 5th Battalion, Royal Tank Corps

Divisional Troops

- 12th Lancers (administered by the 2nd Cavalry Brigade)

=== August 1938–April 1939 ===
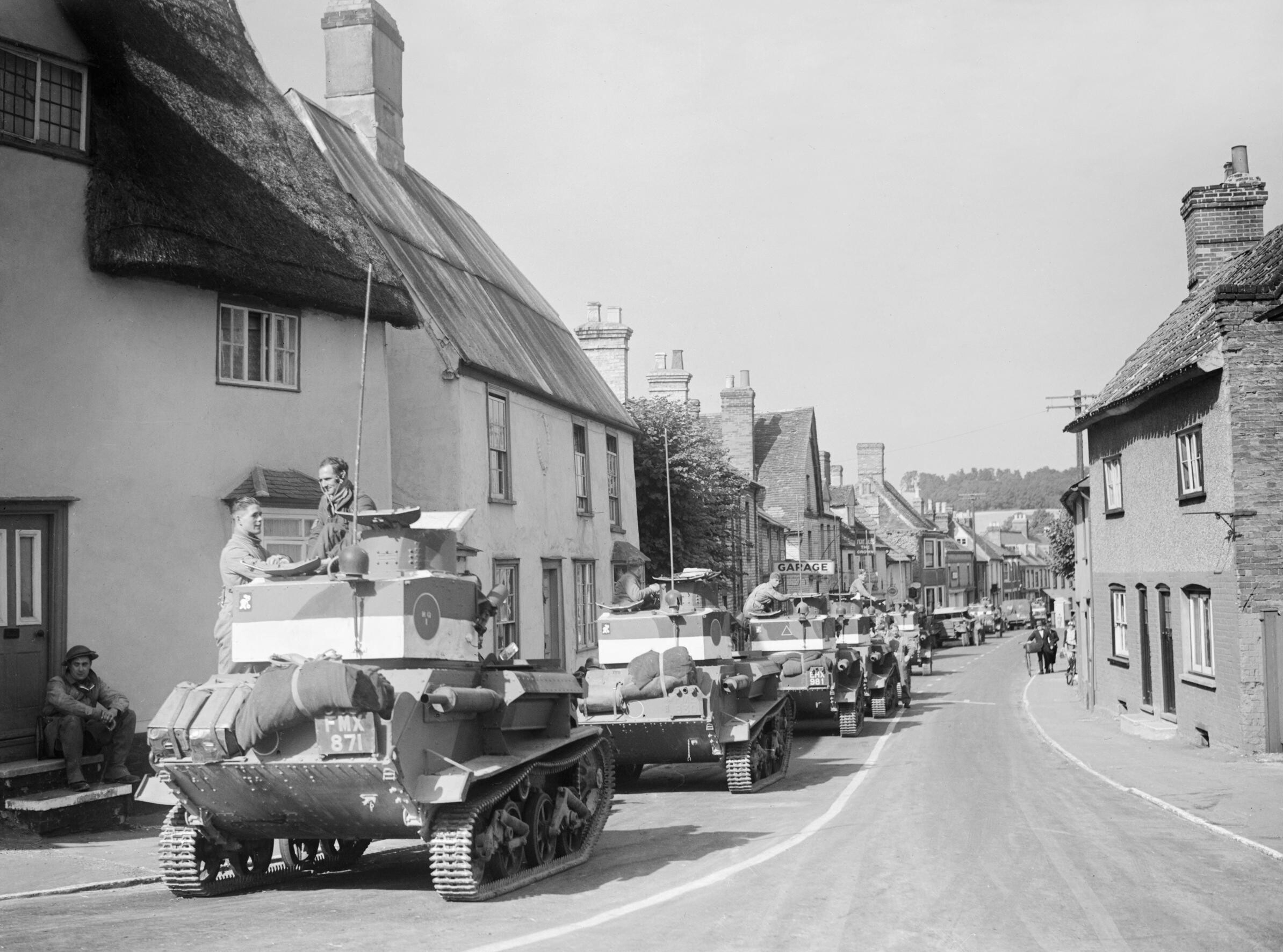
An example of the Light Tank Mk VI, the primary tank the two cavalry brigades were equipped with.

Mobile Division

1st Cavalry Brigade

- King's Dragoon Guards
- 3rd Hussars
- 4th Queen's Own Hussars

2nd Cavalry Brigade

- 2nd Dragoon Guards (Queen's Bays)
- 9th Queen's Royal Lancers
- 10th Hussars

1st Tank Brigade

- 2nd Battalion, Royal Tank Corps
- 3rd Battalion, Royal Tank Corps
- 5th Battalion, Royal Tank Corps

Divisional troops

- Divisional artillery, Royal Artillery
  - 1st Royal Horse Artillery
  - 2nd Royal Horse Artillery
- Divisional engineers, Royal Engineers
  - 1st Field Park Squadron
- Royal Army Service Corps
  - 4th (until end of 1938), 10th, 11th (joined January 1939), 23rd (until end of 1938), 27th, 36th (until end of 1938), 55th (joined January 1939), and 62nd Companies
- Mobile Divisional Signals, Royal Corps of Signals
- 12th Lancers
- 2nd Battalion, King's Royal Rifle Corps
- 1st Battalion, Rifle Brigade

=== April-September 1939 ===
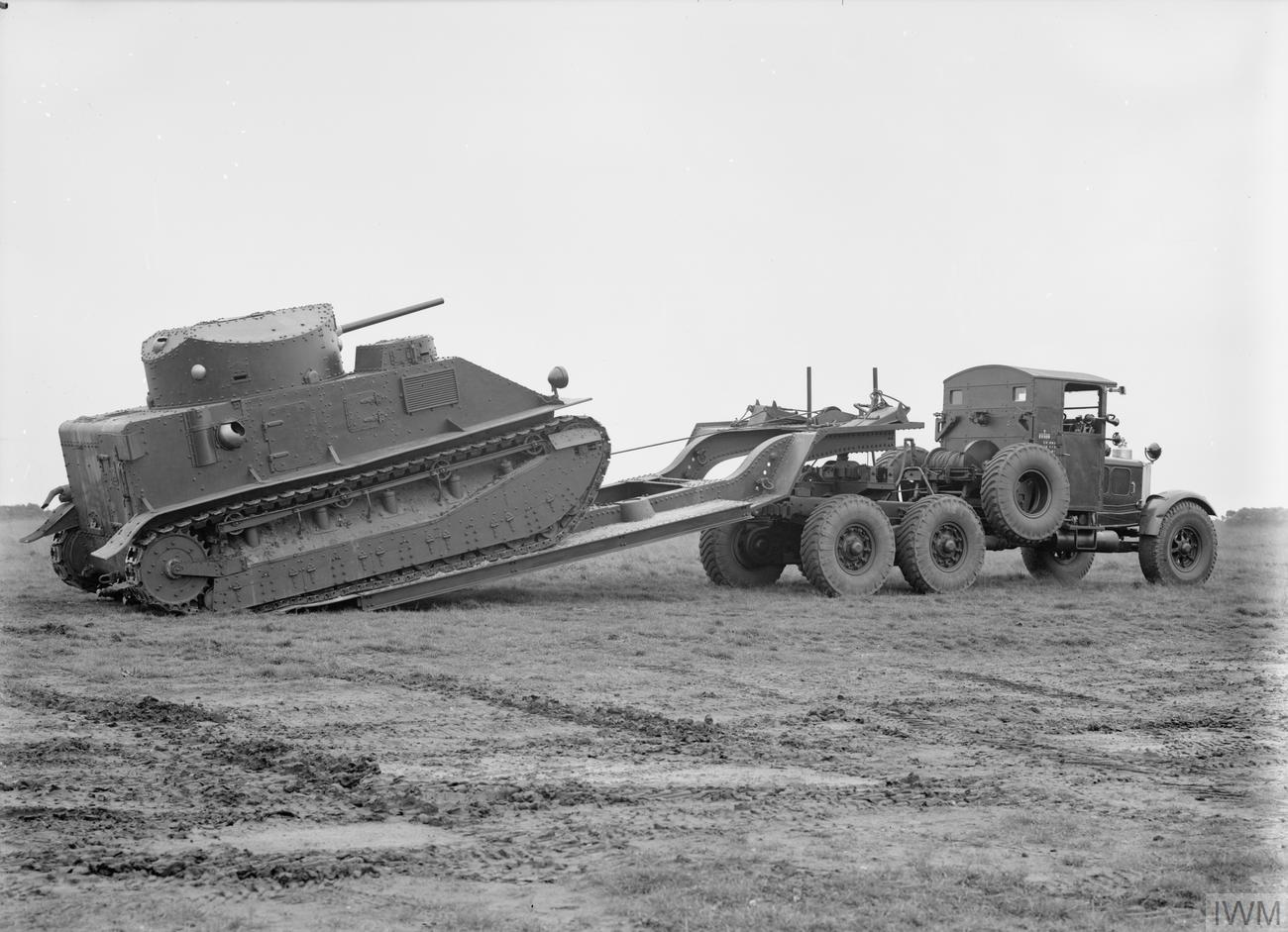
A MK II medium tank loading onto a Scammell Pioneer tank transporter

1st Armoured Division

1st Light Armoured Brigade

- King's Dragoon Guards
- 3rd Hussars
- 4th Queen's Own Hussars

2nd Light Armoured Brigade

- 2nd Dragoon Guards (Queen's Bays)
- 9th Queen's Royal Lancers
- 10th Hussars

1st Heavy Armoured Brigade

- 2nd Royal Tank Regiment
- 3rd Royal Tank Regiment
- 5th Royal Tank Regiment

Divisional troops

- Divisional artillery, Royal Artillery
  - 1st Royal Horse Artillery
  - 2nd Royal Horse Artillery
- Divisional engineers, Royal Engineers
  - 1st Field Park Squadron
- Royal Army Service Corps
  - 10th, 11th, 27th, 55th, 62nd, and 63rd Companies
- Mobile Divisional Signals, Royal Corps of Signals
- 2nd Battalion, King's Royal Rifle Corps
- 1st Battalion, Rifle Brigade

=== September 1939–April 1940 ===
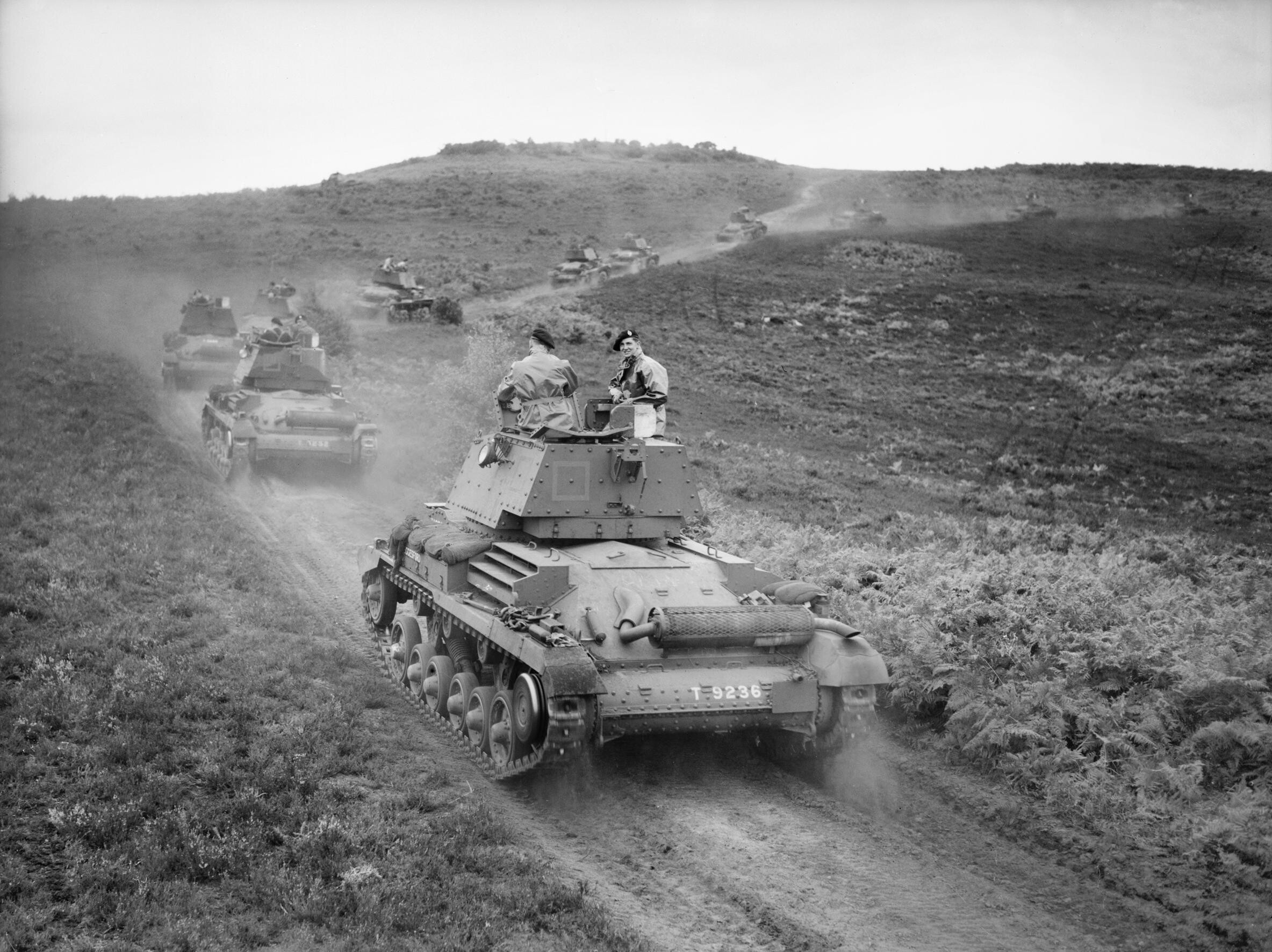
The division's 5th Royal Tank Regiment, equipped with the Cruiser Mk I, on maneuverers in 1940.

1st Armoured Division

1st Light Armoured Brigade (until 4 November 1939)

- King's Dragoon Guards
- 3rd Hussars
- 4th Queen's Own Hussars

2nd Light Armoured Brigade (renamed 2nd Armoured Brigade on 14 April 1940)

- 2nd Dragoon Guards (Queen's Bays)
- 9th Queen's Royal Lancers
- 10th Hussars

1st Heavy Armoured Brigade (renamed 3rd Armoured Brigade on 14 April 1940)

- 2nd Battalion, Royal Tank Regiment
- 3rd Battalion, Royal Tank Regiment
- 5th Battalion, Royal Tank Regiment

1st Support Group

- 1st Royal Horse Artillery (until 20 October 1939)
- 2nd Royal Horse Artillery (until 20 October 1939)
- 60th Anti-Tank Regiment (joined 22 December 1939, left 14 February 1940)
- 101st Light Anti-Aircraft/Anti-tank Regiment (joined 15 February 1940)
- 1st Field Squadron, Royal Engineers (until 31 January 1940)
- 1st Field Park Troop, Royal Engineers (until 31 January 1940)
- 1st Battalion, Rifle Brigade (until 24 April 1940)
- 2nd Battalion, King's Royal Rifle Corps (until 24 April 1940)

== Battle of France ==
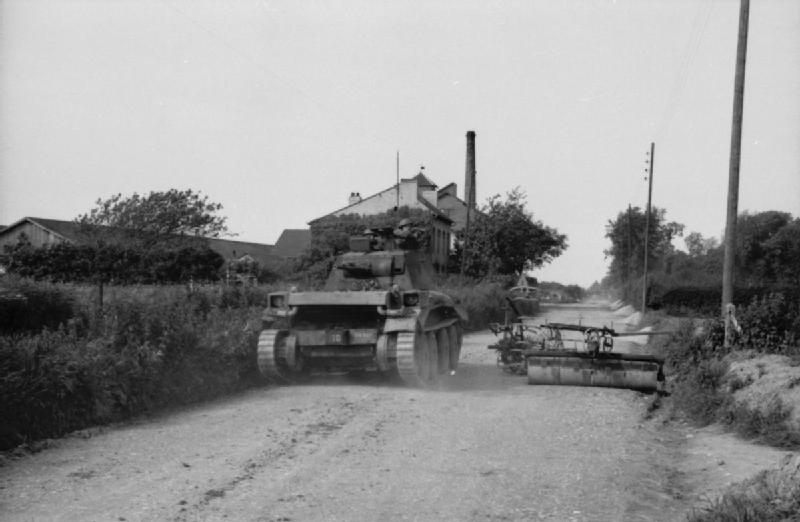
A cruiser tank of the division (turret facing to the rear) moves through a French village, May 1940

From the beginning of the Second World War in September 1939, the 1st Armoured Division had been used to provide troops and material for other formations. In October, two regiments of artillery were withdrawn from the support group and dispatched to France. The following month, an armoured brigade was withdrawn to form the 2nd Armoured Division. In January 1940, engineers were removed to serve elsewhere and they were followed by an armoured regiment and the division's infantry in April and May, just prior to the division being deployed to France.

These changes left the 1st Armoured Division short of its required subordinate units, although it did contain 114 light and 143 cruiser tanks. It, however, lacked replacement tanks, spare parts, bridging and wireless equipment, and anti-tank and anti-aircraft guns. The advance elements of the division landed in France on 15 May 1940, and the first major components arrived four days later. It took another week until the entire division had been deployed. It fought in a number of engagements, most notably the Battle of Abbeville, and suffered heavy tank losses in its encounters with German forces. By 18 June, with 13 tanks remaining, it completed its evacuation to the UK.

=== May–June 1940 ===
1st Armoured Division

2nd Armoured Brigade

- 2nd Dragoon Guards (Queen's Bays)
- 9th Queen's Royal Lancers
- 10th Royal Hussars
- 4th Battalion, Border Regiment (attached for fighting on 24 May)

3rd Armoured Brigade

- 2nd Royal Tank Regiment
- 3rd Royal Tank Regiment (until 22 May 1940)
- 5th Royal Tank Regiment

1st Support Group

- 101st Light Anti-Aircraft/Anti-Tank Regiment, Royal Artillery

Divisional troops

- 1st Armoured Divisional Signals, Royal Corps of Signals
- Royal Engineers
  - 1st Field Squadron

== North Africa campaign ==
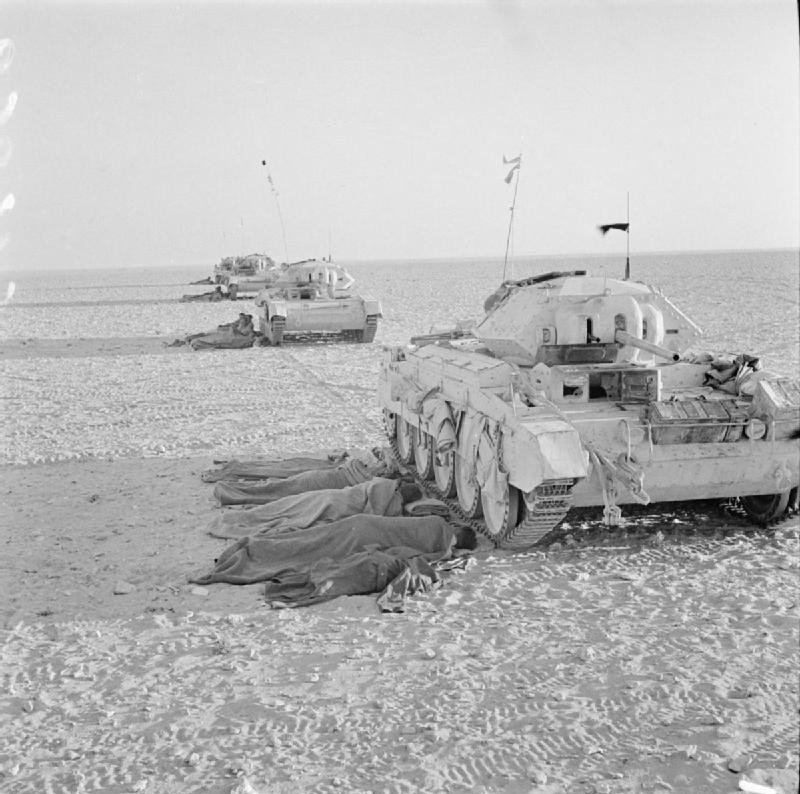
An example of Crusader tanks, with crews asleep on the ground

During 1941, an armoured division was to consist of 340 tanks. Due to ongoing fighting in Egypt and Italian Libya, armoured reinforcements were requested from the UK and the 1st Armoured Division was used to provide these. With 60 M3 Stuart light tanks and 124 Crusader tanks, the division left the UK in August—just before organisational changes to the layout of UK-based armoured divisions were made. The changes, however, were not forced upon divisions serving in Africa. The division arrived in Egypt in mid-November and moved into Italian Libya the following month.

In January 1942, after clashes with Axis armoured forces, the division was attacked and forced to retreat to Gazala. On 27 February, a new organisation for North African-based armoured divisions was announced. Each was to include one armoured brigade group consisting of three armoured regiments, one motorised infantry battalion, engineers, anti-tank and anti-aircraft guns, and artillery; as well as one motor brigade group composed of three motorised infantry battalions with the same selection of supporting arms as the armoured brigade. This reorganisation called for the support group to be abolished, which resulted in its units being dispersed to other formations located nearby. Due to the mixture of British and American tanks in use, different organisations for the armoured regiments equipped with both were drawn up. Those with M3 Grants and Stuarts were intended to have 24 of the former and 20 of the latter. Those equipped with a mix of Crusaders and Grants were intended to have 36 of the former and 12 of the latter. These changes had not been implemented by the start of the Battle of Gazala, a few months later. Between the 1st and the 7th Armoured Divisions, there were 167 Grants, 257 Crusaders, and 149 Stuart tanks available for the battle. A breakdown of what each formation had, is not provided by the official history for this period, and the various armoured regiments fought under the banner of each division at various points of the battle. On 12 June, for example, all tanks were placed under the command of the 1st Armoured Division, which then consisted of 206 tanks (83 Grants, 59 Crusaders, and 64 Stuarts). After battling with two German armoured divisions, it ended the day with 50 serviceable tanks; the rest had been either destroyed or sent to workshops to be repaired.

After further fighting, the division retreated from Gazala. It then fought in the Battle of Mersa Matruh, before a further retreat took place to El Alamein. This was followed by the First Battle of El Alamein and heavy tank losses resulted in some regiments being temporarily amalgamated; for example, the 3rd Royal Tank Regiment and the 5th Royal Tank Regiment became the 3rd/5th Royal Tank Regiment until they were eventually rebuilt as separate entities. Tank strength fluctuated due to losses, reinforcements, and other changes. For example, on 15 July, the division had 77 Grants, 82 Crusaders, and 32 Stuarts; on 21 July, 61 Grants, 81 Crusaders, and 31 Stuarts. At the end of the battle, the division was allowed a period of rest. Additional war office guidelines for divisional structure were released on 24 August and maintained most of the ideas laid out in February, although it did abolish brigade groups and changed how supporting arms were used. The change resulted in the armoured brigade containing three armoured regiments and one battalion of infantry, and the motor brigade controlling just infantry. The supporting arms, such as artillery and engineers, became divisional troops rather than assigned to a specific brigade as they had been under the brigade group concept. The 1st Armoured Division was reorganised to conform to these new guidelines and on paper would have 172 tanks. When the division mustered for the Second Battle of El Alamein, it contained slightly fewer: 1 Grant, 92 Shermans, and 68 Crusaders. After the battle concluded in an Allied victory, the division pursued Axis forces across North Africa. It then fought in the Tunisia campaign until May 1943, when Axis forces surrendered in Africa. With the conclusion of the campaign, the division remained in North Africa until 1944.

=== Initial desert battles (January–May 1942) ===
1st Armoured Division

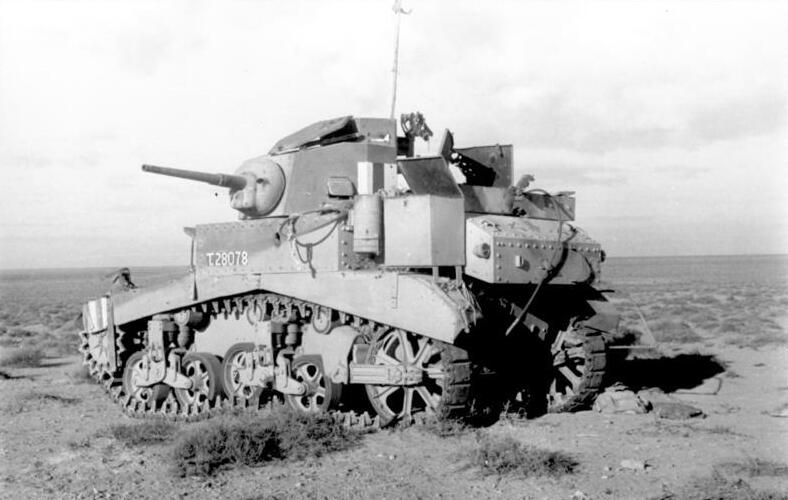
An example of the M3 Stuart, taken in 1941

2nd Armoured Brigade (2nd Armoured Brigade Group after March)

- 2nd Dragoon Guards (Queen's Bays)
- 9th Queen's Royal Lancers
- 10th Royal Hussars
- 1st Battalion, Rifle Brigade
- 11th Regiment, Royal Horse Artillery (from March)
- 44th Light Anti-Aircraft Battery, Royal Artillery (from March)
- 88th Light Anti-Aircraft Battery, Royal Artillery (from March)
- No. 1 Troop, 7th Field Squadron, Royal Engineers (until 19 March)
- No. 3 Troop, 1st Field Squadron, Royal Engineers (from 19 March)
- 1st Light Field Ambulance, Royal Army Medical Corps (from March)
- A and B Companies, Royal Army Service Corps (from March)

22nd Armoured Brigade Group (from 23 April)

- Royal Gloucestershire Hussars
- 3rd County of London Yeomanry (Sharpshooters)
- 4th County of London Yeomanry (Sharpshooters)
- 107th Regiment, Royal Horse Artillery
- 13th/7th Field Squadron, Royal Engineers
- 2nd Light Field Ambulance, Royal Army Medical Corps
- 67th and 432nd Companies, Royal Army Service Corps

1st Support Group (until 11 February 1942, when dispersed)

- 11th Regiment, Royal Horse Artillery (until 29 January)
- 2nd Regiment, Royal Horse Artillery (from 31 January)
- 61st Light Anti-Aircraft Regiment (until 26 January)
- 82nd Light Anti-Aircraft Regiment (from 26 January)
- 76th Anti-Tank Regiment (until 29 January)
- 102nd (Northumberland Hussars) Anti-Tank Regiment (from 29 January)
- 2nd Battalion, King's Royal Rifle Corps

200th Guards Brigade Group (from 12 February 1942. Renamed 200th Guards Motor Brigade Group on 6 April, then 201st Guards Motor Brigade Group on 21 May.)

- 2nd Battalion, Scots Guards
- 3rd Battalion, Coldstream Guards
- 9th Battalion, Rifle Brigade
- 2nd Regiment, Royal Horse Artillery (from 21 April)
- 1st Field Squadron, Royal Engineers (from 21 April)
- 903rd Company, Royal Army Service Corps (from 24 May)
- 5th Light Field Ambulance, Royal Army Medical Corps (from April)
- 200th (later 201st) Ordnance Company, Royal Army Ordnance Corps (from 24 May)
- 200th (later 201st) Provost Section, Royal Military Police (from 25 May)
- 200th (later 201st) Postal Unit (from 25 May)

Divisional troops

- Divisional engineers, Royal Engineers
  - 1st Field Squadron (until 4 February)
  - 7th Field Squadron (until 19 March)
  - 1st Field Park Squadron
- 1st Armoured Divisional Signals, Royal Corps of Signals
- 12th Royal Lancers (until 12 May)
- 1st The Royal Dragoons (from 12 May)

=== Battle of Gazala (26 May–21 June 1942) ===
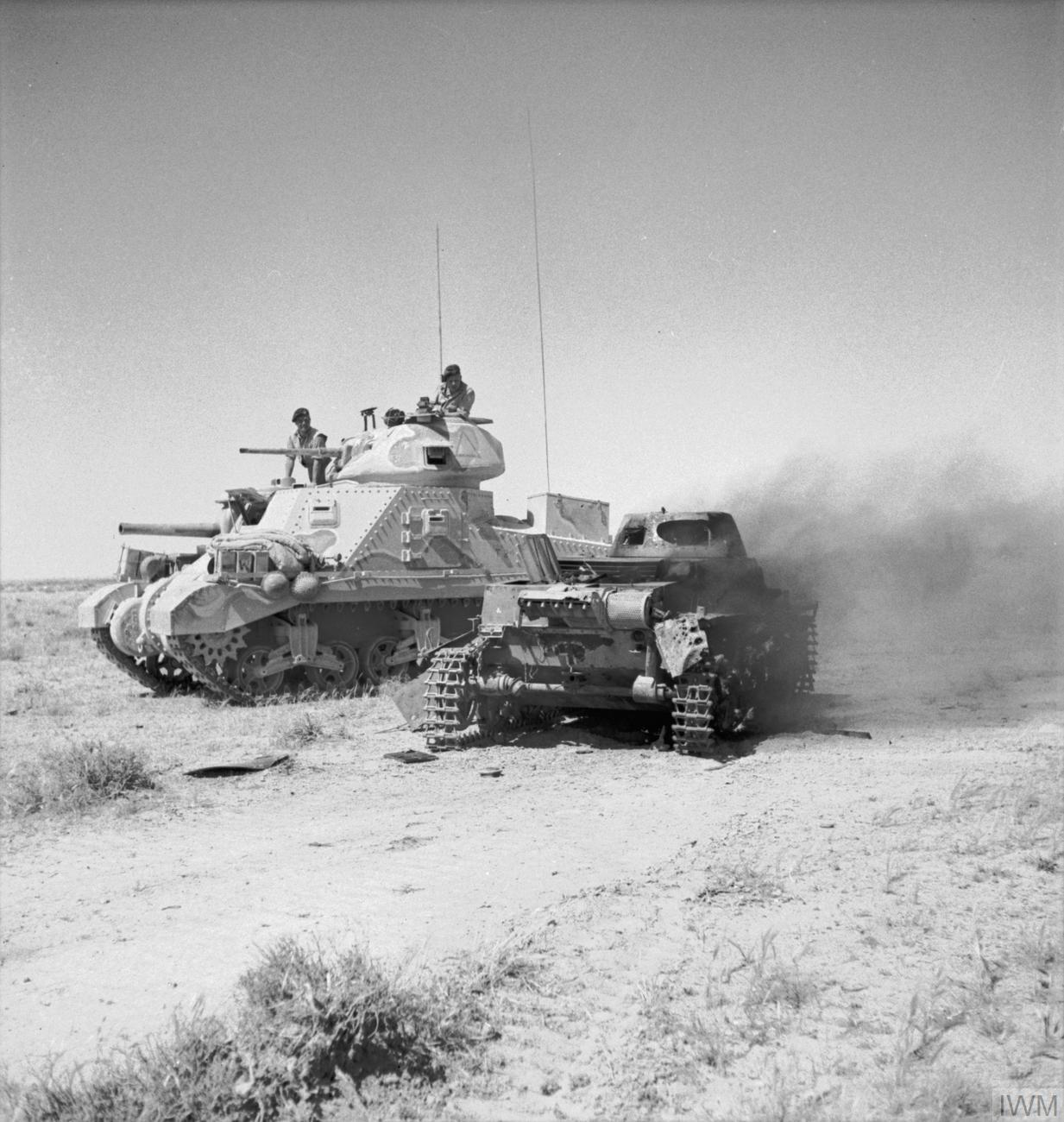
A M3 Grant next to a destroyed Panzer I, during the fighting at Gazala

1st Armoured Division

2nd Armoured Brigade Group (under the control of the 7th Armoured Division between 5–7 June, 11 June, and part of 12 June)

- 2nd Dragoon Guards (Queen's Bays)
- 9th Queen's Royal Lancers
- 10th Royal Hussars
- 1st Battalion, Rifle Brigade
- 11th Regiment, Royal Horse Artillery
- 44th Light Anti-Aircraft Battery, Royal Artillery
- 88th Light Anti-Aircraft Battery, Royal Artillery
- No. 3 Troop, 1st Field Squadron, Royal Engineers
- 1st Light Field Ambulance, Royal Army Medical Corps
- A and B Companies, Royal Army Service Corps

4th Armoured Brigade Group (assigned from the 7th Armoured Division between 29–31 May, 2–6 June, and 13–14 June)

- 8th King's Royal Irish Hussars
- 3rd Royal Tank Regiment (until 7 June)
- 5th Royal Tank Regiment (until 7 June)
- 1st Royal Tank Regiment (from 3 June)
- 6th Royal Tank Regiment (from 7 June)
- 1st Battalion, King's Royal Rifle Corps
- 1st Regiment, Royal Horse Artillery
- One troop from the 171st Light Anti-Aircraft Battery
- One troop from the 4th Field Squadron, Royal Engineers
- 151st Light Field Ambulance, Royal Army Medical Corps

22nd Armoured Brigade Group (under the control of the 7th Armoured Division between 4–7 June)

- Royal Gloucestershire Hussars
- 3rd County of London Yeomanry (Sharpshooters)
- 4th County of London Yeomanry (Sharpshooters)
- 1st Battalion, Rifle Brigade (from 19 June)
- 107th Regiment, Royal Horse Artillery (until 6 June)
- 13th/7th Field Squadron, Royal Engineers
- 2nd Light Field Ambulance, Royal Army Medical Corps
- 67th and 432nd Companies, Royal Army Service Corps

201st Guards Motor Brigade Group (until 14 June)

- 2nd Battalion, Scots Guards
- 3rd Battalion, Coldstream Guards
- 9th Battalion, Rifle Brigade
- 2nd Regiment, Royal Horse Artillery
- 1st Field Squadron, Royal Engineers
- 903rd Company, Royal Army Service Corps
- 5th Light Field Ambulance, Royal Army Medical Corps
- 201st Ordnance Company, Royal Army Ordnance Corps
- 201st Provost Section, Royal Military Police
- 201st Postal Unit

Divisional troops

- Divisional engineers, Royal Engineers
  - 1st Field Park Squadron
- 1st Armoured Divisional Signals, Royal Corps of Signals
- 1st The Royal Dragoons

=== Battle of Mersa Matruh (26–29 June 1942) ===
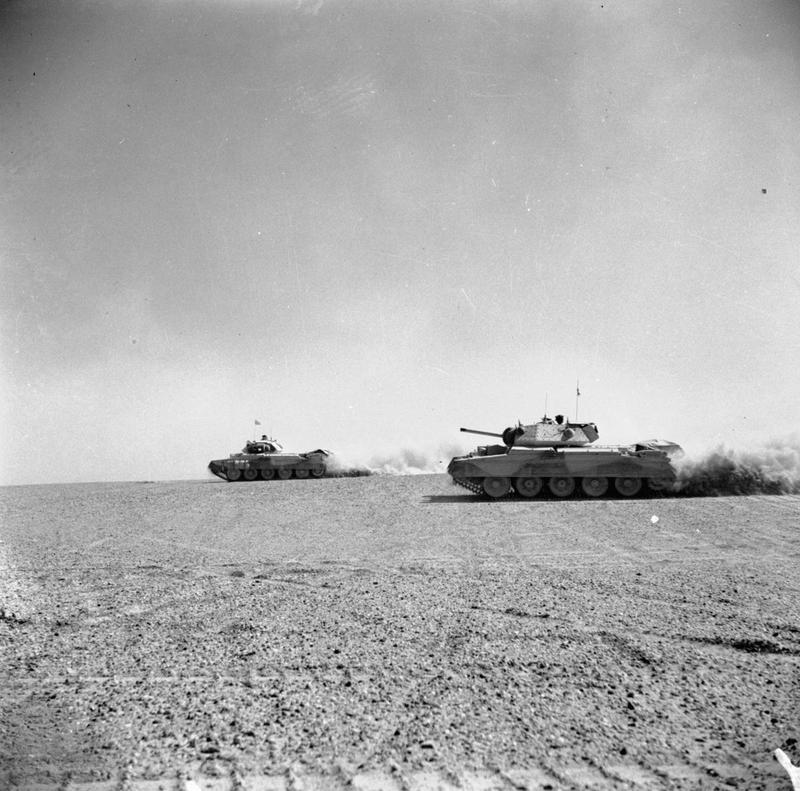
Crusaders of the division moving across the desert

1st Armoured Division

4th Armoured Brigade Group

- 1st Royal Tank Regiment
- 6th Royal Tank Regiment
- 8th Royal Tank Regiment
- 1st Battalion, King's Royal Rifle Corps
- 1st Regiment, Royal Horse Artillery
- One troop from the 171st Light Anti-Aircraft Battery
- One troop from the 4th Field Squadron, Royal Engineers
- 151st Light Field Ambulance, Royal Army Medical Corps

22nd Armoured Brigade Group

- Royal Gloucestershire Hussars
- 3rd County of London Yeomanry (Sharpshooters)
- 4th County of London Yeomanry (Sharpshooters)
- 1st Battalion, Rifle Brigade
- 2nd Regiment, Royal Horse Artillery
- 20th Field Troop, Royal Engineers
- 2nd Light Field Ambulance, Royal Army Medical Corps
- 67th and 432nd Companies, Royal Army Service Corps

7th Motor Brigade Group

- 2nd Battalion, King's Royal Rifle Corps
- 2nd Battalion, Rifle Brigade
- 9th Battalion, King's Royal Rifle Corps
- 4th Regiment, Royal Horse Artillery
- 4th Field Squadron (minus one troop), Royal Engineers
- 15th Light Ambulance, Royal Army Medical Corps
- 550th Company, Royal Army Service Corps
- Brigade ordinance company, Royal Army Service Corps

3rd Indian Motor Brigade (came under command on 26 June, but ordered to Middle East to refit)

Divisional troops

- Divisional engineers, Royal Engineers
  - 1st Field Park Squadron
- 1st Armoured Divisional Signals, Royal Corps of Signals
- 1st The Royal Dragoons

=== First Battle of El Alamein (1–27 July 1942) ===
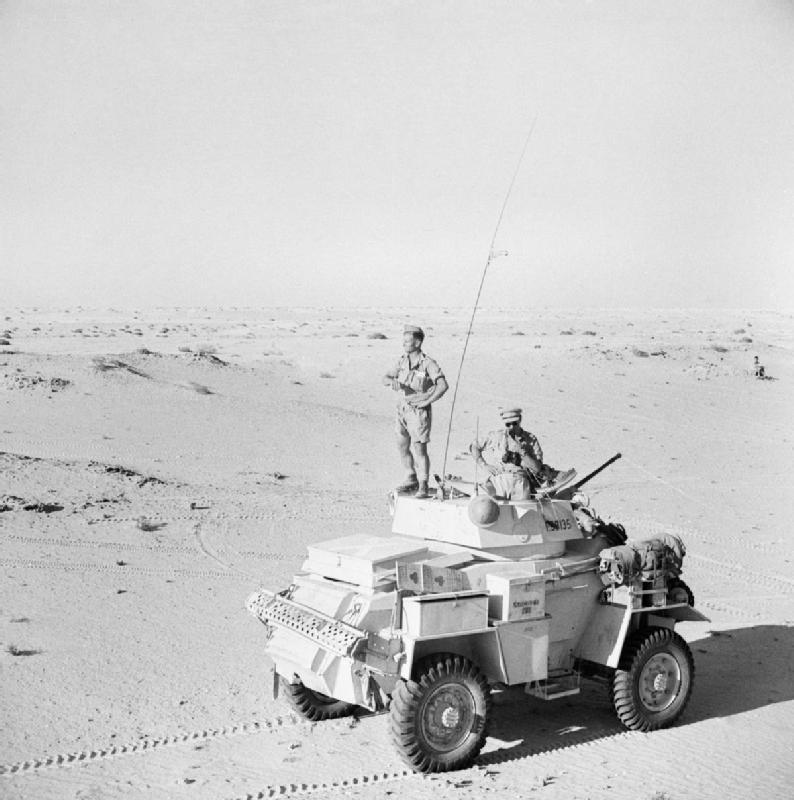
A Humber Armoured Car of the 12th Royal Lancers, on patrol on the El Alamein battlefield, July 1942

1st Armoured Division

2nd Armoured Brigade Group (from 5 July, became 2nd Armoured Brigade on 7 July)

- 3rd/5th Royal Tank Regiment
- 3rd County of London Yeomanry (Sharpshooters) (from 7 July, until 13 July)
- 6th Royal Tank Regiment (from 7 July)
- 9th Queen's Royal Lancers (from 13 July)
- 1st Battalion, King's Royal Rifle Corps (from 7 July)
- 11th Regiment, Royal Horse Artillery (until 7 July)
- 44th Light Anti-Aircraft Battery, Royal Artillery (until 7 July)
- 88th Light Anti-Aircraft Battery, Royal Artillery (until 7 July)
- No. 3 Troop, 1st Field Squadron, Royal Engineers (until 7 July)
- 1st Light Field Ambulance, Royal Army Medical Corps (until 7 July)
- A and B Companies, Royal Army Service Corps (until 7 July)

4th Armoured Brigade Group (until 7 July, then from 26 to 27 July)

- 1st Royal Tank Regiment (until 7 July)
- 6th Royal Tank Regiment (until 7 July)
- 8th Royal Tank Regiment
- 4th/8th Hussars (from 14 July)
- 11th Hussars (from 16 July)
- 12th Royal Lancers (from 18 July)
- 1st Battalion, King's Royal Rifle Corps (until 7 July)
- 9th Battalion, Rifle Brigade (from 18 July)
- 1st Regiment, Royal Horse Artillery (until 7 July)
- 3rd Regiment, Royal Horse Artillery (26–27 July)
- One troop from the 171st Light Anti-Aircraft Battery (until 7 July)
- One troop from the 113th Light Anti-Aircraft Battery (26–27 July)
- One troop from the 4th Field Squadron, Royal Engineers (until 7 July)
- One troop from the 3rd Field Squadron, Royal Engineers (26–27 July)
- 151st Light Field Ambulance, Royal Army Medical Corps (until 7 July)
- 14th Light Field Ambulance, Royal Army Medical Corps (26–27 July)

22nd Armoured Brigade Group

- Royal Gloucestershire Hussars
- 3rd County of London Yeomanry (Sharpshooters)
- 4th County of London Yeomanry (Sharpshooters)
- 1st Battalion, Rifle Brigade
- 2nd Regiment, Royal Horse Artillery
- 20th Field Troop, Royal Engineers
- 2nd Light Field Ambulance, Royal Army Medical Corps
- 67th and 432nd Companies, Royal Army Service Corps

Divisional troops

- Divisional engineers, Royal Engineers
  - 1st Field Park Squadron
- 1st Armoured Divisional Signals, Royal Corps of Signals
- 1st The Royal Dragoons

=== Second Battle of El Alamein (23 October – 11 November 1942) ===
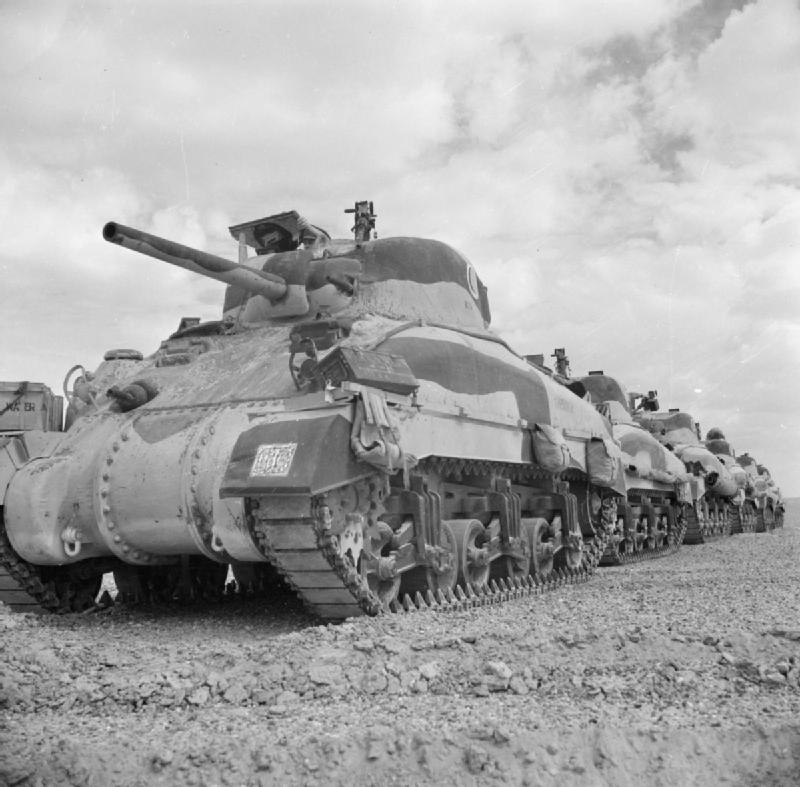
M4 Sherman tanks of the 2nd Dragoon Guards (Queen's Bays), 24 October 1942

1st Armoured Division

2nd Armoured Brigade

- 2nd Dragoon Guards (Queen's Bays)
- 9th Queen's Royal Lancers
- 10th Royal Hussars
- Queen's Own Yorkshire Dragoons
- 1st Battalion, Rifle Brigade

7th Motor Brigade

- 2nd Battalion, King's Royal Rifle Corps
- 2nd Battalion, Rifle Brigade
- 7th Battalion, Rifle Brigade

8th Armoured Brigade (from 30 October until 4 November)

- Sherwood Rangers Yeomanry
- Staffordshire Yeomanry
- 3rd Royal Tank Regiment
- 1st Battalion, Buffs (Royal East Kent Regiment)

Divisional troops

- Divisional artillery
  - Royal Horse Artillery
    - 2nd Regiment
    - 4th Regiment
    - 11th (Honourable Artillery Company) Regiment
  - Royal Artillery
    - 76th Anti-Tank Regiment
    - 42nd Light Anti-Aircraft Regiment
- Divisional engineers, Royal Engineers
  - 1st Field Squadron
  - 7th Field Squadron
  - 1st Field Park Squadron
- 1st Armoured Divisional Signals, Royal Corps of Signals
- 12th Royal Lancers

=== November 1942–May 1943 ===
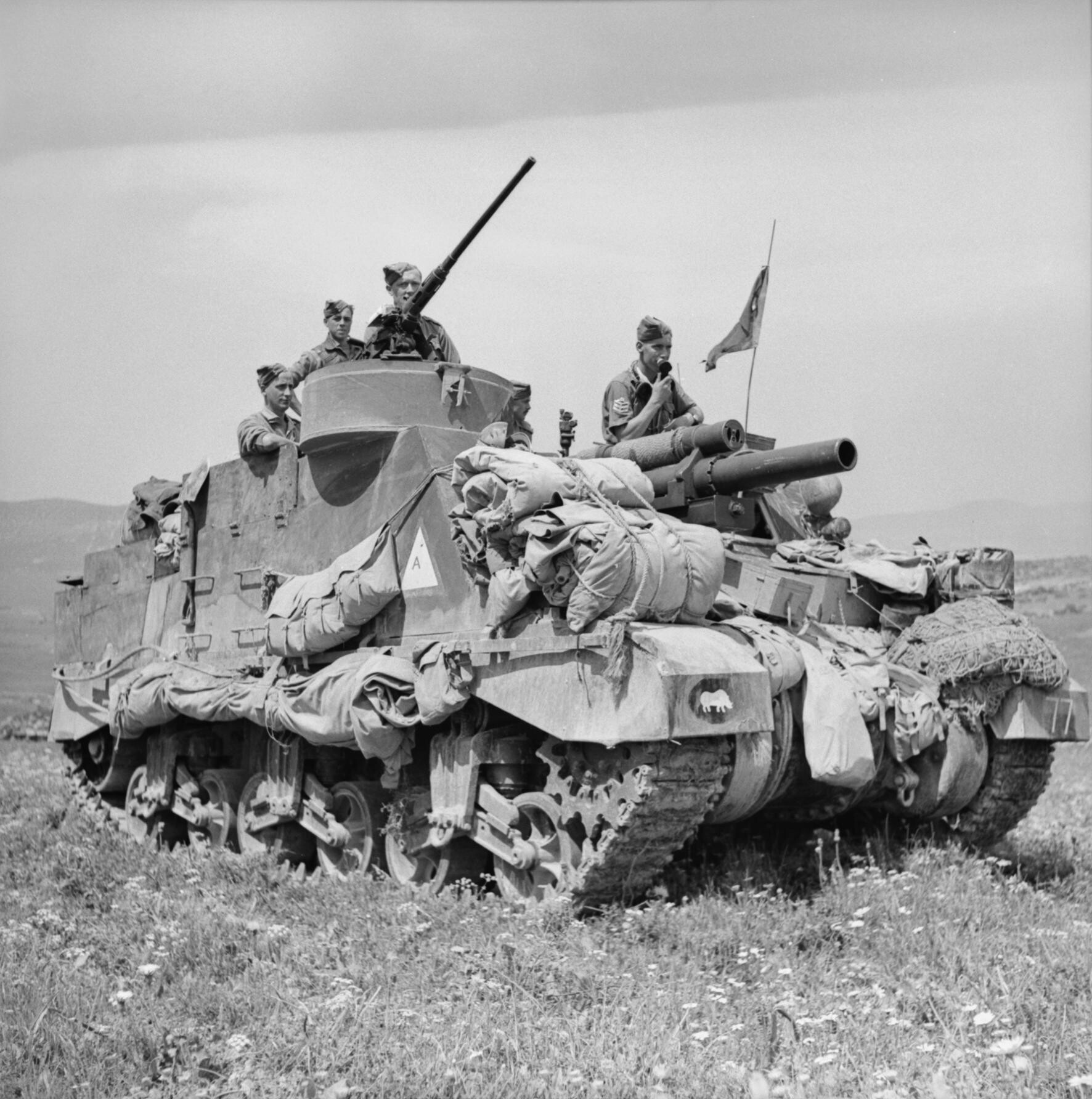
A M7 Priest of the 11th (Honourable Artillery Company) Regiment, Royal Horse Artillery, 22 April 1943.

1st Armoured Division

2nd Armoured Brigade

- 2nd Dragoon Guards (Queen's Bays)
- 9th Queen's Royal Lancers
- 10th Royal Hussars
- Queen's Own Yorkshire Dragoons (until 18 December 1942)
- 9th Battalion, King's Own Yorkshire Light Infantry (from 19 December 1942)

7th Motor Brigade

- 2nd Battalion, King's Royal Rifle Corps (until 18 December 1942)
- 2nd Battalion, Rifle Brigade
- 7th Battalion, Rifle Brigade
- 1st Battalion, King's Royal Rifle Corps (from 15 January 1943)
- Divisional artillery
  - Royal Horse Artillery
    - 2nd Regiment
    - 4th Regiment
    - 11th (Honourable Artillery Company) Regiment
  - Royal Artillery
    - 76th Anti-Tank Regiment
    - 42nd Light Anti-Aircraft Regiment
- Divisional engineers, Royal Engineers
  - 1st Field Squadron
  - 7th Field Squadron
  - 1st Field Park Squadron
- 1st Armoured Divisional Signals, Royal Corps of Signals
- 12th Royal Lancers

== Italian campaign ==
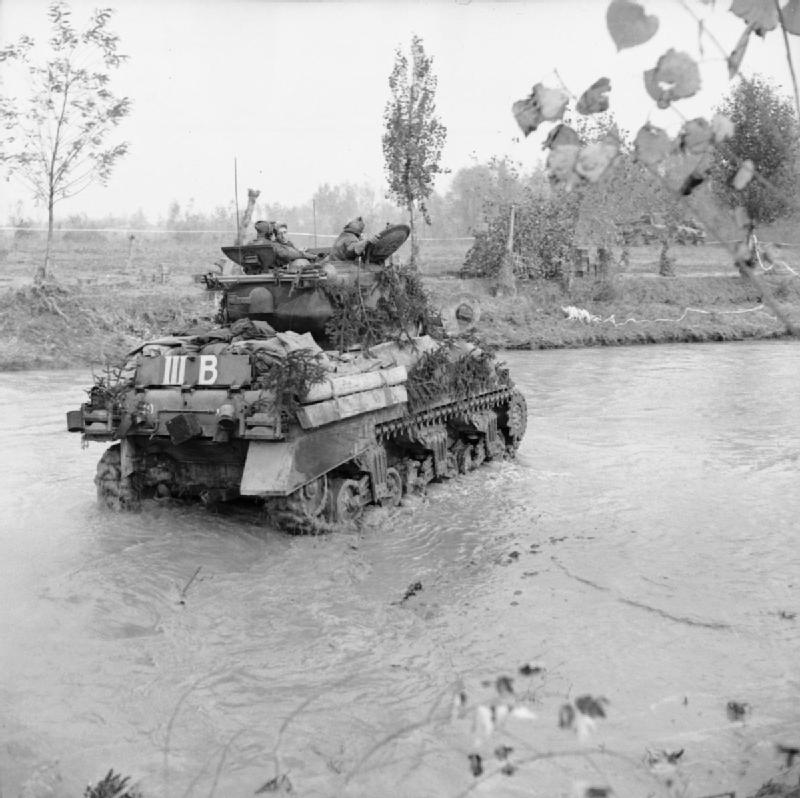
A Sherman tank of the 2nd Armoured Brigade in Italy (after it became an independent formation).

On 27 May 1944, the 1st Armoured division started to move from North Africa to Italy, at which point its main formation was the 2nd Armoured Brigade. Landings in Italy were completed by 14 June and over the next two months, the division was brought up to strength. By this point, a full-strength armoured division was to have 14,964 personnel, 4,267 vehicles including 366 tanks, 48 pieces of artillery, 54 anti-tank guns, and 24 tank destroyers. The division was allocated two infantry brigades due to the need for additional infantry support considering the fighting conditions in Italy. Initially, the 66th Infantry Brigade was assigned but was switched with the 18th Infantry Brigade before the division went into combat. This brigade had earlier fought together with the division, when it was named the 7th Motor Brigade. The second infantry formation was the 43rd Gurkha Lorried Infantry Brigade. By the start of combat operations, the division had around 140 tanks. Between late August and the end of September, the several engagements were fought as part of the Allied assault on the German Gothic Line and nearly 2,000 casualties was suffered by the division.

By mid-1944, the British Army was in the midst of a personnel crisis; it did not have enough men to replace casualties suffered by front line infantry. In the Italian theatre, the army needed to find at least 21,000 reinforcements. To address this, the War Office started to transfer men from the Royal Artillery and the Royal Air Force to infantry training depots. This did not solve the shortage, so the decision was made to disband divisions and transfer personnel in order to keep a fewer number of combat formations as close to full strength as possible. The 1st Armoured Division was chosen to be disbanded as part of this effort. The 43rd Gurkha Lorried Infantry Brigade was transferred to the 56th (London) Infantry Division to strengthen it. The divisional troops and the 18th Infantry Brigade were broken-up and their personnel reassigned to other formations as reinforcements. The 2nd Armoured Brigade was kept intact and became an independent armoured formation. The divisional headquarters was also maintained and by October, it commanded two ad hoc units in addition to a vastly different 18th Infantry Brigade. The headquarters relinquished command of its final troops on 28 October 1944 and the 1st Armoured Division ceased to be an operational formation thereafter. It was officially disbanded on 11 January 1945.

=== May–September 1944 ===
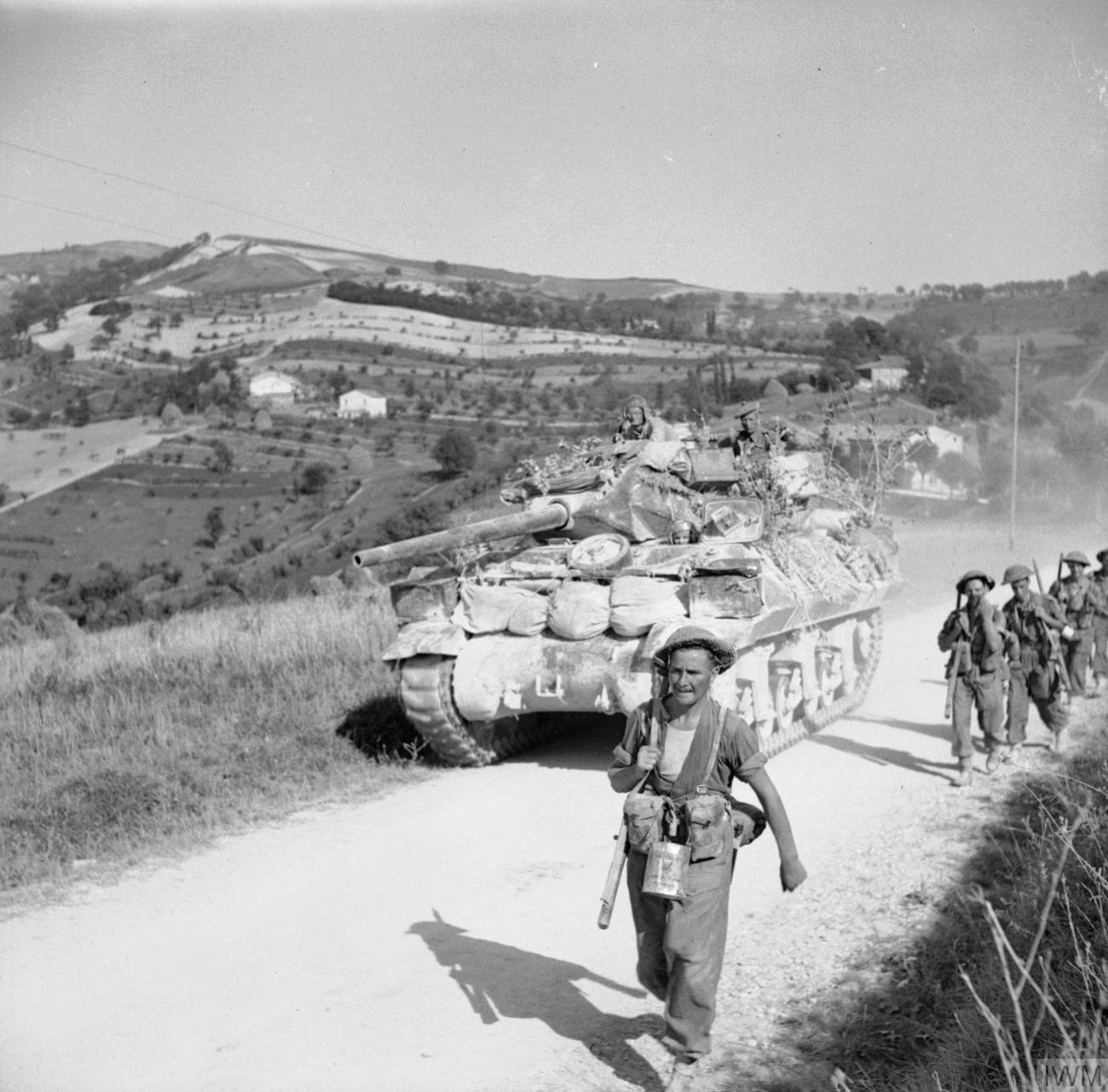
An example of the M10 Wolverine tank destroyer, used by anti-tank regiments.

1st Armoured Division

2nd Armoured Brigade (the brigade was detached from the division between 5–7 June and 11–12 June)

- 2nd Dragoon Guards (Queen's Bays)
- 9th Queen's Royal Lancers
- 10th Royal Hussars
- 1st Battalion, King's Royal Rifle Corps

43rd Gurkha Lorried Infantry Brigade (assigned on 21 July, but did not join until 2 August)

- 2nd Battalion, 6th Queen Elizabeth's Own Gurkha Rifles
- 2nd Battalion, 8th Gurkha Rifles
- 2nd Battalion, 10th Princess Mary's Own Gurkha Rifles

66th Infantry Brigade (from 20 July, until 12 August)

- 2nd Battalion, Royal Scots
- 1st Battalion, Hertfordshire Regiment
- 11th Battalion, Lancashire Fusiliers

18th Infantry Brigade (from 17 August)

- 1st Battalion, Buffs (Royal East Kent Regiment)
- 9th Battalion, King's Own Yorkshire Light Infantry
- 14th Battalion, Sherwood Foresters

Divisional troops:

- 1st Armoured Divisional artillery
  - Royal Artillery
    - 23rd Field Regiment
    - 60th Anti-tank Regiment
    - 42nd Light Anti-Aircraft Regiment
  - Royal Horse Artillery
    - 2nd Regiment (from 23 August)
    - 11th (Honourable Artillery Company) Regiment
- Divisional engineers, Royal Engineers
  - 1st Field Squadron
  - 7th Field Squadron (until 20 August)
  - 622nd Field Squadron
  - 627th Field Squadron (from 21 August)
  - 1st Field Park Squadron (until 25 August)
  - 631st Field Park Squadron (from 26 August)
  - 27th Bridging Troop
- 1st Armoured Divisional Signals, Royal Corps of Signals
- Divisional reconnaissance
  - 4th Queen's Own Hussars

=== October 1944 ===
1st Armoured Division

Wheeler Force

- 1st Horse (Skinner's Horse)
- Nabha Akal Infantry
- A small number of troops from the 8th Battalion, Manchester Regiment

Elbo Force

- Composition unknown

18th Infantry Brigade

- 1/4th Battalion, Essex Regiment
- Lovat Scouts
- 53rd Light Anti-Aircraft Regiment, Royal Artillery (organised as infantry)

== See also ==
- List of commanders of the British 1st Armoured Division
- Guy Lizard
