= List of commanders of the British 1st Armoured Division =

Military unit officers

Mobile Division 1st Armoured Division 1st British Armoured Division
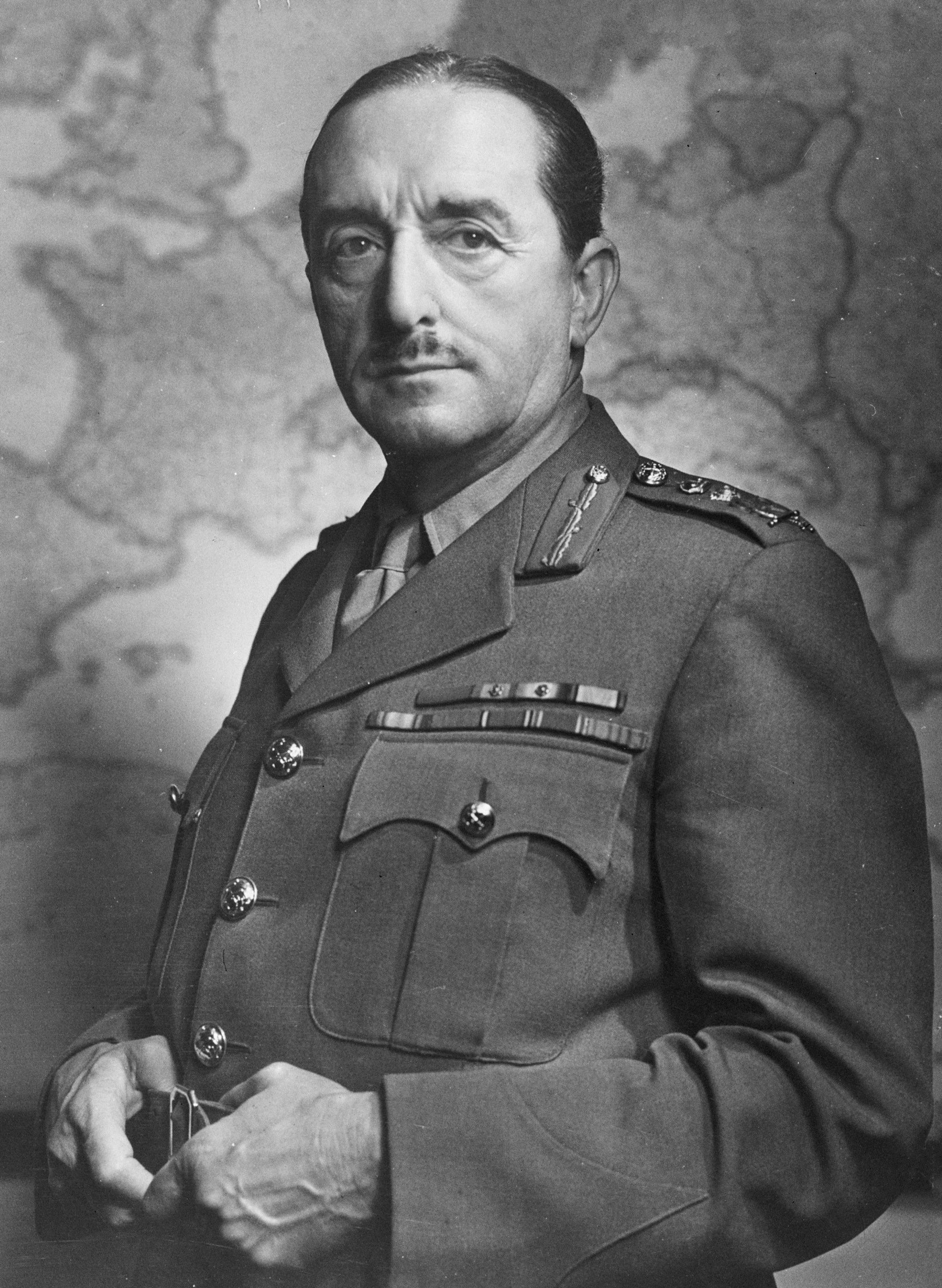
- Alan Brooke, the first commanding officer of the Mobile Division
- Active: 1937–1945; 1977–2014
- Country: United Kingdom
- Branch: British Army
- Engagements: Second World War

The 1st Armoured Division was an armoured division of the British Army, formed 1937, and active 1937-45 and 1977-2014.

The division was commanded by a general officer commanding (GOC), who received orders from a level above him in the chain of command, and then used the division to undertake the mission assigned. In addition to directing the tactical battle in which the division was involved, the GOC oversaw a staff and the administrative, logistical, medical, training, and discipline concerns of the division. From its founding in 1939 until 1944, and then 1977-2014, the division had a number of commanders.

On 24 November 1937, after several years of debate on such a formation, the division was founded as the Mobile Division. It was then renamed, in April 1939, as the 1st Armoured Division. Following the start of the Second World War, subordinate units and formations were withdrawn from the division to reinforce others. It was eventually deployed for combat, in May 1940, when it was dispatched to France and subsequently fought in the Battle of France before being withdrawn back to the UK in June during Operation Aerial. In late 1941, the division was sent to North Africa where it took part in the Western Desert campaign, notably fighting at the Battle of Gazala, and the First and the Second Battles of El Alamein. During 1942, Major-General Herbert Lumsden was wounded in action twice while leading the division, and Major-General Alexander Gatehouse was wounded once.

The division then fought in the Tunisian campaign until the Axis defeat in North Africa in May 1943. It was during this period that it was temporarily renamed the 1st British Armoured Division, to avoid it being confused with the American 1st Armored Division that was also fighting in the campaign. With the conclusion of fighting in Tunisia, the division remained in North Africa until 1944. In May 1944, it started to move to Italy to fight in the Italian campaign. Between late August and the end of September, the division fought in several engagements as part of the Allied assault on the German Gothic Line. Due to a manpower crisis within the British Army, the division was chosen to be broken up to provide reinforcements for other formations to attempt to keep them at full strength. In October 1944, the division relinquished command of its final troops and ceased to be an operational formation. It was then disbanded on 11 January 1945.

In 1946, the 6th Armoured Division was redesignated as the 1st Armoured Division. Major-General Charles Loewen retained command following the renaming, and the formation maintained the insignia of the 6th Armoured Division. It undertook occupational duties in Italy, before it was transferred to Palestine and disbanded in 1947.

List of commanders of the 1st Armoured Division during Second World War and Cold War from Wilson's 1993 divisional history.

== General officer commanding ==
General officer commanding
No.	Appointment date	Rank	General officer commanding	Notes	Source(s)
1	24 November 1937	Major-General	Alan Brooke	The division was formed in the United Kingdom, as the Mobile Division.	
2	15 July 1938	Major-General	Roger Evans	During Evans's tenure, the division mobilised for the Second World War. By the outbreak of the war, the formation had been redesignated as the 1st Armoured Division. In May 1940, the division was deployed to France and returned to the UK the following month.	
3	24 August 1940	Major-General	Willoughby Norrie		
4	5 November 1941	Major-General	Herbert Lumsden	During Lumsden's tenure, the division was deployed to North Africa to fight in the Western Desert campaign. Lumsden was wounded during an aerial attack, following the division's arrival in Egypt.	
5	3 January 1942	Major-General	Frank Messervy		
4	12 February 1942	Major-General	Herbert Lumsden	Lumsden was wounded in action on 19 July 1942.	
5	19 July 1942	Major-General	Alexander Gatehouse	When Lumsden was wounded in action, Gatehouse was made the new commander of the division. The division was based in the El Alamein line, while Gatehouse was located in Cairo on other duties. Brigadier Arthur Fisher oversaw the division until Gatehouse arrived late on 20 July, without being made the official acting commanding officer. Gatehouse was wounded in action on 22 July 1942.	
Acting	22 July 1942	Brigadier	Arthur Fisher		
4	15 August 1942	Major-General	Herbert Lumsden		
6	19 August 1942	Major-General	Raymond Briggs	The division entered the Tunisian campaign during March 1943. On 5 April 1943, the division was redesignated as the 1st British Armoured Division.	
Acting	27 April 1943	Brigadier	Thomas Bosvile		
6	1 May 1943	Major-General	Raymond Briggs		
Acting	15 July 1943	Brigadier	Robert Peake		
7	17 July 1943	Major-General	Alexander Galloway		
Acting	18 February 1944	Brigadier	Edward Jones		
7	29 February 1944	Major-General	Alexander Galloway		
Acting	8 March 1944	Brigadier	Richard Goodbody		
Acting	14 March 1944	Brigadier	Edward Jones		
Acting	19 March 1944	Colonel	John MacDonnell		
Acting	24 March 1944	Brigadier	Edward Jones		
7	27 March 1944	Major-General	Alexander Galloway		
Acting	10 April 1944	Brigadier	Edward Jones		
7	15 April 1944	Major-General	Alexander Galloway		
Acting	27 April 1944	Brigadier	Edward Jones		
7	10 May 1944	Major-General	Alexander Galloway	On 27 May 1944, the division was transferred to Italy to take part in the Italian campaign.	
8	14 August 1944	Major-General	Richard Hull	On 28 October 1944, the division ceased to be an operational formation.	
Acting	24 November 1944	Lieutenant-Colonel	James Vogel	On 11 January 1945, the division was disbanded while based in Italy.	

== See also ==
- 6th Armoured Division (United Kingdom), this formation was renamed the 1st Armoured Division in 1946 and was disbanded in 1947. It did not take on the role of this formation, such as changing insignia etc.

== Notes ==
Footnotes

Citations
