= Edward Jones (British Army officer, born 1896) =

British Army officer (1896-1988)

Brigadier Edward Jones MC & Bar
- Born: 24 December 1896
- Died: 6 April 1988 (aged 91); Yeovil, Somerset
- Military career
- Allegiance: United Kingdom
- Branch: British Army
- Service years: 1915−1946
- Rank: Brigadier
- Service number: 13413
- Unit: Royal Artillery
- Conflicts: World War I; World War II
- Awards: Military Cross & Bar

Brigadier Edward Percy Noel Jones, MC & Bar (24 December 1896 – 6 April 1988) was a British Army officer who served as acting General Officer Commanding 1st Armoured Division during the Second World War.

== Military career ==
Jones was commissioned into the Royal Artillery on 27 October 1915. He saw action during the First World War for which he was awarded the Military Cross and a bar to the Military Cross.

Remaining in the British Army during the interwar period, he attended the Staff College, Quetta from 1932 to 1933.

During the Second World War, he served as Director Royal Artillery for 1st Armoured Division in North Africa and briefly served as acting General Officer Commanding 1st Armoured Division on five occasions: from 18 February 1944 to 29 February 1944, from 14 March 1944 to 19 March 1944, from 24 March 1944 to 27 March 1944, from 10 April 1944 to 15 April 1944 and from 27 April 1944 to 10 May 1944. After the war he served as Brigadier, Royal Artillery in India from January 1946 to September 1946.
