= 22nd Armoured Brigade =

Armoured brigade of the British Army

22nd Heavy Armoured Brigade 22nd Armoured Brigade
- Active: 1939–1960; 1981–1993
- Country: United Kingdom
- Branch: British Army
- Type: Armoured
- Size: Brigade
- Part of: 2nd Armoured Division; 7th Armoured Division; 1st Armoured Division
- Garrison/HQ: Campbell Barracks, Hohne (1981–93)
- Engagements: North African Campaign; Italian Campaign; Battle of Normandy; North West Europe campaign

The 22nd Armoured Brigade was an armoured brigade of the British Army that saw service during and after the Second World War. The brigade was formed on the outbreak of war on 3 September 1939 from Territorial Army (TA) armoured regiments. It saw a considerable amount of action during the war, beginning with the Western Desert Campaign where it was engaged in Operation Crusader and at the Battles of Gazala, Mersa Matruh, First Alamein and Alam el Halfa. It then joined the 7th Armoured Division (the 'Desert Rats') for the Second Battle of El Alamein. It remained part of 7th Armoured for the rest of the war, including the campaigns in Tunisia, Italy and North West Europe. It continued in the postwar TA until 1956. The brigade was re-established, made up of regular regiments in Germany, between 1981 and 1993.

== Mobilisation ==
22nd Heavy Armoured Brigade (the 'Heavy' was dropped on 14 April 1940) was formed at the outbreak of the Second World War on 3 September 1939 with the mobilisation of three part-time Yeomanry regiments of the Territorial Army (TA): 2nd Royal Gloucestershire Hussars (RGH), 3rd County of London Yeomanry (Sharpshooters) and 4th County of London Yeomanry (Sharpshooters) (CLY). (Note: The 4th CLY was the 2nd Line duplicate of the 3rd CLY formed on 27 September 1939; 2nd RGH was the 2nd Line duplicate of the RGH formed on 24 August 1939.) On 15 January 1940 it joined 2nd Armoured Division in Northern Command. Because 1st Armoured Division in France with the British Expeditionary Force (BEF) had first call on scarce resources, the equipment of 2nd Armoured Division and its units proceeded slowly during the Phoney War period.

When the Battle of France was lost and the BEF was being evacuated from Dunkirk (without its equipment) at the end of May, the incomplete 2nd Armoured Division was the only armoured formation available to Home Forces. It was moved into the area between Northampton and Newmarket, Suffolk, to be ready to counter-attack in the event of invasion.

As the threat of invasion of the United Kingdom receded, it became possible to spare more troops and equipment to reinforce Middle East Forces facing the Italians. Most of 2nd Armoured Division was sent out on 26 October 1940, but 22nd Armoured Brigade remained in the UK, having been transferred to 1st Armoured Division. It adopted the new organisation for an armoured brigade, which included a battalion of motorised infantry (2nd Kings Royal Rifle Corps). 10th Company Royal Army Service Corps provided the brigade's transport.

== North Africa ==
By the summer of 1941 the Italians in Libya had been reinforced by General Rommel's Afrika Korps and the tide had turned against the British forces (most of 2nd Armoured Division was captured on 8 April). The Defence Committee of the British War Cabinet decided to send out 22nd Armoured Brigade as soon as possible. It was recognised that the brigade had been trained in an anti-invasion role and would require a certain amount of preparation on arrival – in desert navigation, for instance. Its new Crusader tanks would also require modification for desert conditions. But the Defence Committee hoped that the brigade would reach Egypt by mid-September and be ready for action by 1 November. In fact, the convoy carrying 22nd Armoured Brigade sailed (without its motor battalion) on 15 August, and after rounding the Cape of Good Hope it finally arrived in Egypt on 2 October. The start of Eighth Army's counter-offensive (Operation Crusader) had to be put off until mid-November.

=== Operation Crusader ===
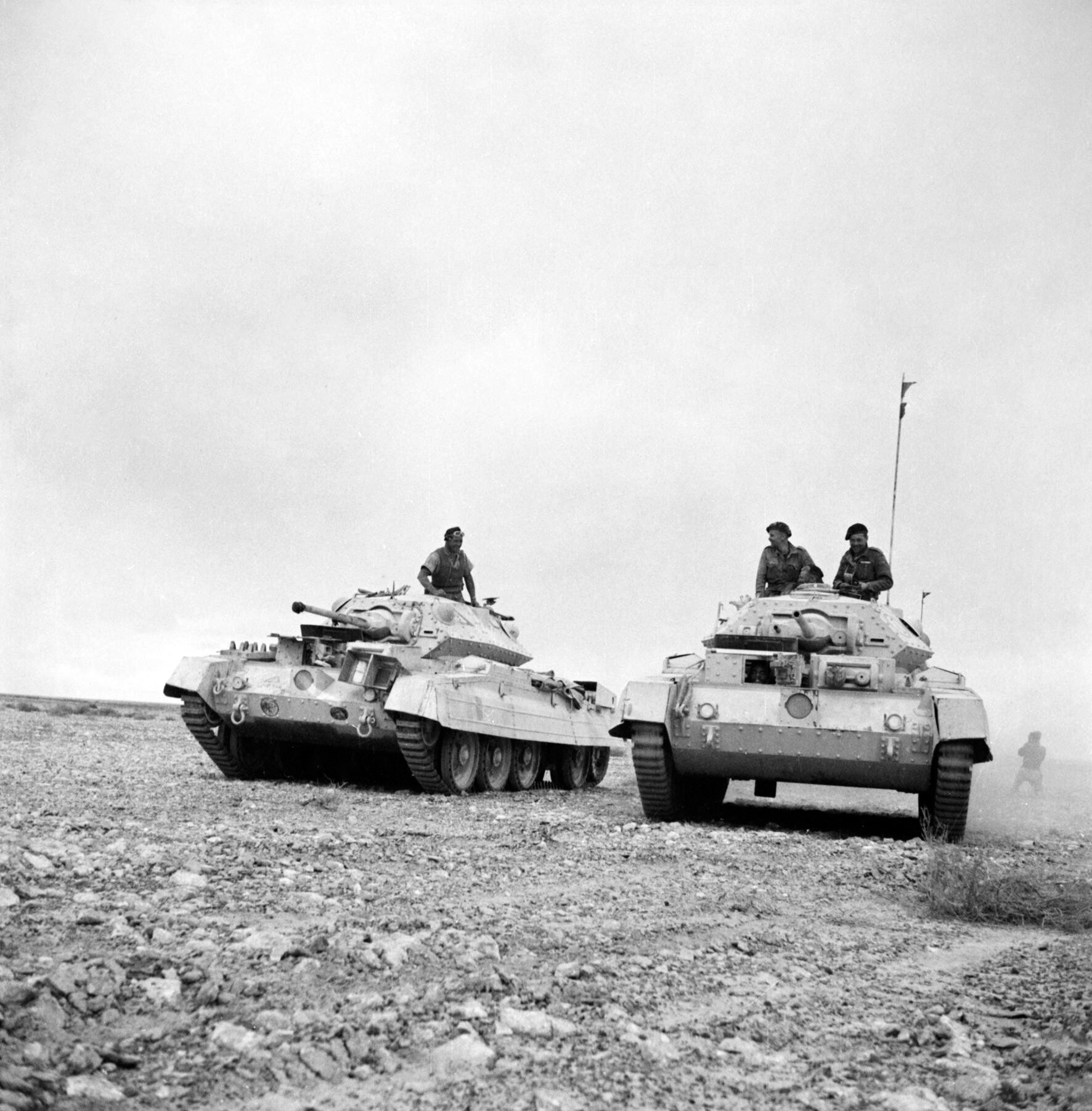
Mark I Crusader tanks in the Western Deseret, November 1941.

The brigade joined 7th Armoured Division for Operation Crusader. Reinforced by C Battery, 4th Royal Horse Artillery and a Troop of D Battery, 102nd (Northumberland Hussars) Anti-Tank Regiment, Royal Artillery, the brigade's role was to find and destroy the enemy armour. Eighth Army's advance began at dawn on 18 November and had approximately reached its first day's objectives by evening, but mechanical breakdowns had already reduced 22nd Armd Bde's tank strength from 155 to 136 runners. Next day it was reconnoitring forward towards Bir el Gub when the divisional commander arrived and ordered it to attack the Italian Ariete Division. The inexperienced Yeomanry attacked impetuously, and after driving in the Italian covering troops came under heavy fire from the prepared positions behind and was forced to break off the attack. The brigade had lost 52 tanks, had destroyed 34 Italian medium tanks, damaged 12 others and knocked out 12 guns but was unable to carry the Ariete position.

On 20 November the Afrika Korps counter-attacked and 22nd Armoured Bde was recalled from Bir el Gub to take part in the imminent armoured battle. It arrived too late to influence the indecisive battle. The garrison of Tobruk began its breakout next day, and the Afrika Korps hurried north to prevent this, pursued by Eighth Army's armour, including 22nd Armoured Bde. However the pursuers were held up by rearguards, boggy ground, and the need to refuel. Over the next few days there was confused fighting round Sidi Rezegh airfield that reduced 22nd Armd Bde's fighting strength from 79 to 34 tanks by the end of 22 November. Next day it did its best to hold off a renewed Axis attack, but lost another third of its tanks. The fighting round Sidi Rezegh ended when Rommel sent the Afrika Korps on a 'Dash to the Wire', driving eastwards behind Eighth Army towards the Egyptian frontier. The crippled British armoured formations could do little about it, though Tobruk was relieved.

By the time the brigade rejoined the fighting on 22 December it had received fresh tanks: 3rd and 4th CLY had 80 Crusaders between them, while 2nd RGH had 30 M3 Stuart light tanks. It was now under the direct command of XIII Corps (the rest of 1st Armoured Division had now arrived in Egypt but was still training for desert warfare). 22 to 25 December was spent regaining contact with the enemy's new positions. Then on 27 December Gen Ludwig Crüwell commanding the armour of the Afrika Korps noticed a gap between 22nd Armd Bde at Chor es Sufan and 22nd Guards Brigade north of Agedabia. Rommel approved Crüwell's proposal to defeat the British armour in detail, and he attacked the following day with 15th and 21st Panzer Divisions comprising 60 tanks (of which 44 were Panzer IIIs and IVs), against 22nd Armd Bde's 90 available tanks (35 Stuarts, the rest Crusaders). 22nd Armoured Brigade also had under its command 2nd Regiment Royal Horse Artillery (RHA) (two 8-gun 25-pounder batteries), 102nd (NH) Anti-Tank Regiment (three 12-gun batteries of 2-pounders), 122 Light Anti-Aircraft Battery (12 x Bofors 40 mm guns) and the motorised infantry of 9th Battalion Rifle Brigade (Tower Hamlets Rifles). The German attack was a notable success, 22nd Armd Bde being driven back across the Wadi Faregh with the loss of 37 tanks (many to mechanical breakdown) against only seven German tanks knocked out. The brigade with its supporting troops was attacked again on 30 December and was again mauled, losing another 23 tanks. Having won a respite the Germans withdrew to El Agheilia, while 22nd Armd Bde, having lost nearly all its Crusaders, was also withdrawn to refit.

=== Battle of Gazala ===
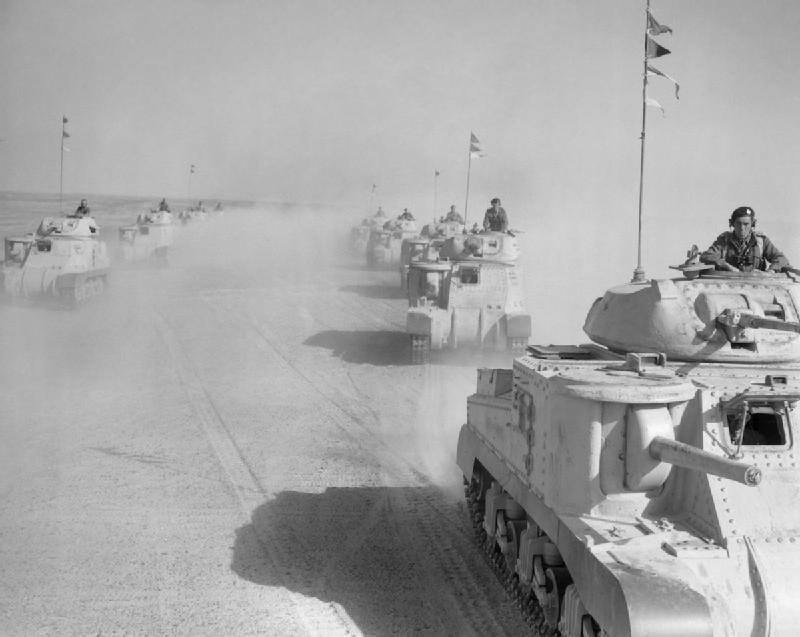
Grant tanks of 5th RTR on the move in the Western Desert, 17 February 1942.

On 4 March 1942 22nd Armd Bde was reorganised as an independent Brigade Group, with supporting artillery, engineer, transport and medical units. It returned to the front on 17 April 1942 under XXX Corps, coming under the command of 1st Armd Division on 23 April. The Battle of Gazala began on 26 May when Rommel tried to outflank the Gazala Line of defensive 'boxes'. XXX Corps moved south to give battle the following day. Before 22nd Armd Bde had got far it was attacked by both of the Afrika Korps' Panzer divisions, and it was ordered to fall back to the 'Knightsbridge' box, with the loss of 30 tanks and several guns. From Knightsbridge the brigade was able to attack the Germans' right flank, dealing some sharp blows. 22nd Armoured Bde spent the next day watching the immobile 15th Panzer Division (which was out of fuel). On 29 May the Axis armour began to close in around Knightsbridge, and 22nd Armd Bde sent two regiments to help 2nd Armd Bde in a fierce armour and artillery action fought in a sandstorm. By evening both sides were battered and exhausted. On 30 May 22nd Armd Bde made unsuccessful attacks on the enemy anti-tank (A/T) screen. By now the battle had become a succession of confused armoured actions in the 'Cauldron' amidst the defensive boxes occupied by the infantry. Eighth Army made a new attack on the Cauldron on 4/5 June: 22nd Armd Bde had simultaneously to attack enemy armour and assist 9th Indian Infantry Bde. The attack began in moonlight at 02.50 and at first went well, 9th Indian Bde and 107th Rgt RHA of 22nd Armd Bde taking its opening positions, but the Axis positions were further back than realised, and the brigade's armour (156 Crusader, Stuart and Grant tanks) ran into the concentrated fire of the enemy's artillery and a panzer counter-attack. The tanks could give no aid to 9th Indian Bde, which was pushed off its objectives, and at the end of the day 22nd Armd Bde withdrew to Leaguer with the loss of some 60 tanks. The following day the infantry and artillery, including 107th Rgt RHA, were overrun in the Cauldron.

Replacing tanks after the Cauldron battle was complicated by the different tank types used by different regiments in the armoured brigades. By 12 June 22nd Armd Bde had 27 Grants, 5 Stuarts and 34 Crusaders. Disruption was also caused by the frequent exchanges of brigades between different armoured division HQs – 22nd Armd fought under the command alternately of 1st and 7th Armd Divisions. The final phase of the Battle of Gazala began on 12 June, and British tank losses were again heavy. The following day Eighth Army began to withdraw. In a rearguard action 22nd Armd Bde foiled Rommel's attempt to cut the coast road, but the retreat went back to position around Mersa Matruh.

=== Mersa Matruh and First Alamein ===
1st Armoured Division, including 22nd Armd Bde, was positioned a few miles south west of Mersa Matruh when Rommel began probing the position on the evening of 26 June. 22nd Armoured Bde only had 3rd and 4th CLY in the line, though it was reinforced by the re-equipped 2nd Dragoon Guards (Queen's Bays) of 2nd Armd Bde on 28 June while the Battle of Mersa Matruh continued. Rommel got between the Eighth Army's formations and forced them to retreat again, and by 30 June they were back at the El Alamein position.

The Axis advance was halted by the British armoured brigades and artillery on 1–2 July in the First Battle of El Alamein. By 3 July 22nd Armd Bde was down to 20 Grants, 29 Stuarts and 8 Crusaders, but with 4th Armd Bde it awaited the enemy attack south of the Ruweisat Ridge and stopped it after a sharp engagement lasting half an hour. Eighth Army was counter-attacking by 15 July, 22nd Armd Bde supporting the 2nd New Zealand Division. In this attack the brigade consisted solely of 3rd CLY, but was joined during the afternoon by the newly arrived Royal Scots Greys (RSG) in their first tank action, giving a total of 31 Grants, 21 Stuarts and 23 Crusaders. The fighting died down by the end of July.

=== Battle of Alam el Halfa ===
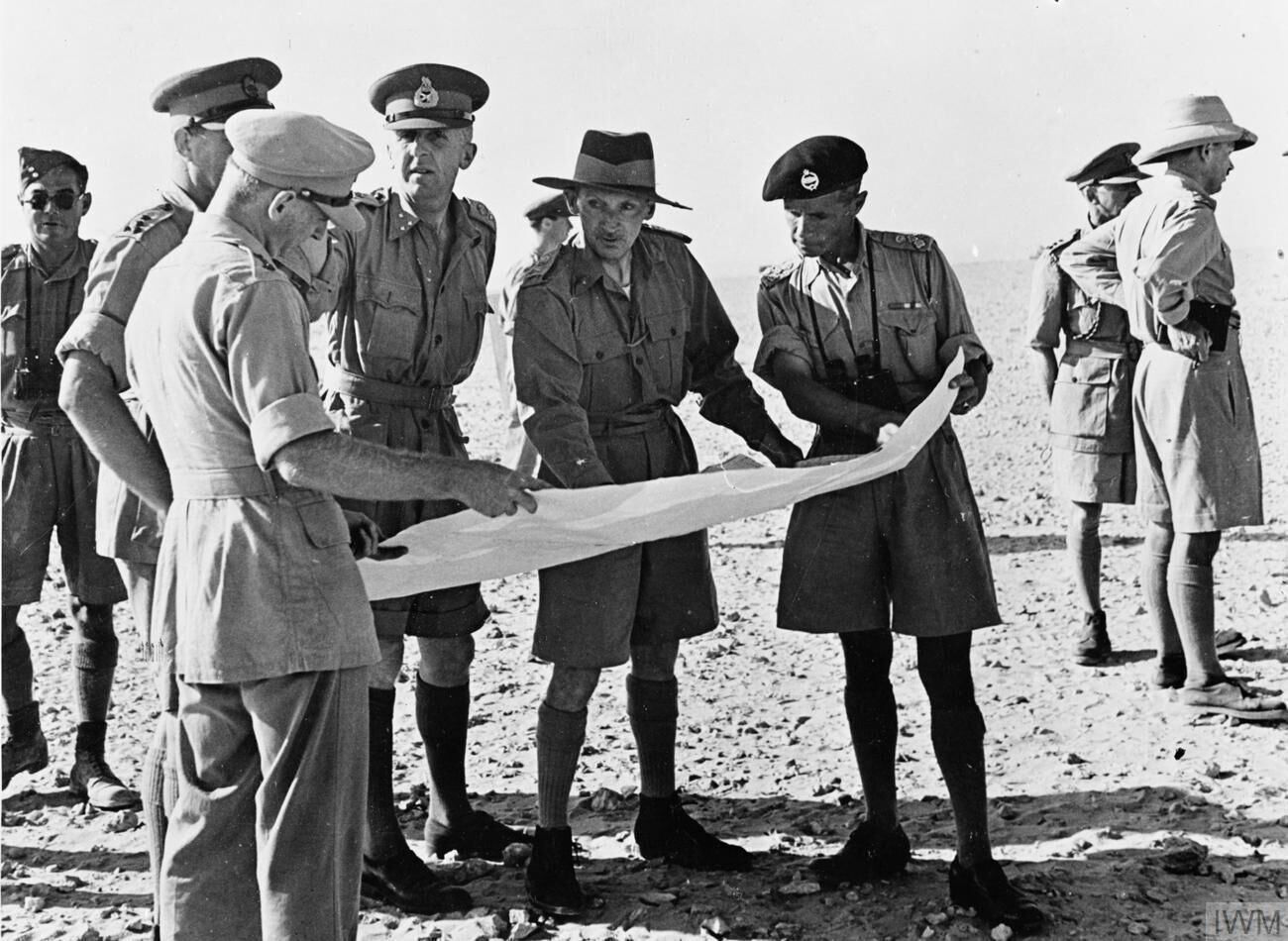
Lieutenant-Generals Bernard Montgomery, the new commander of the Eighth Army, and Brian Horrocks, the new GOC XIII Corps, discussing troop dispositions at 22nd Armoured Brigade HQ, 20 August 1942. The brigade commander, Brigadier "Pip" Roberts is on the right (in beret).

By the time Rommel made a renewed attack on the British positions at Alam el Halfa on 30 August, Eighth Army had been reinforced and was under fresh commanders, including Lieutenant-General Bernard Montgomery at Eighth Army, Lt-Gen Brian Horrocks at XIII Corps, and Brigadier Philip 'Pip' Roberts, who took command of 22nd Armd Bde on 27 July. The brigade group (operating under 10th Armd Division) now had four armoured regiments (three of them composite): RSG, 1st/6th Royal Tank Regiment (RTR), 5th RTR/2nd RGH, and 3rd/4th CLY. Each had a light squadron of Stuarts or Crusaders and two heavy squadrons of Grants, totalling 40 Stuarts, 34 Crusaders and 92 Grants. The Grants with their 75mm guns (known as 'Egypt's last hope') were dug around Point 102 in front of the Alam el Halfa ridge alongside the 6-pounder A/T guns of the brigade's motor battalion, 1st Rifle Brigade (RB). Two squadrons of Crusaders were stationed 2 miles (3.2 km) to the south, to lure the Afrika Korps onto this line. On the morning of 31 August 15th and 21st Panzer Divisions did not take this bait but headed eastwards past the brigade's position. 22nd Armoured Bde therefore showed some of its tanks, which caused 21st Panzer to swing round and head for 3rd/4th CLY in the centre. A fierce duel began, in which the RSGs, 1st and 104th RHA and 44th (Home Counties) Division's artillery all joined in. 15th Panzer circled round to threaten 5th RTR/2nd RGH, but darkness was falling and the panzers were running short of fuel after the heavy going. Once Montgomery was satisfied that the Afrika Korps was committed, he launched a limited attack southwards and on 2 September Rommel called off the attack and retreated to his starting position with severe casualties. 22nd Armoured Bde had only lost five of its Grants destroyed.

=== Second Alamein ===
22nd Armoured Brigade Group now reverted to being a normal armoured brigade as a permanent part of 7th Armoured Division. Its tank strength on the eve of the Second Battle of El Alamein was:

- Brigade HQ – 4 Crusaders
- 1st RTR –24 Grants, 19 Stuarts
- 5th RTR – 24 Grants, 18 Crusaders
- 4th CLY – 9 Grants, 29 Crusaders

These included 8 of the new Crusader Mark III equipped with the 6-pdr gun. The Motor Battalion was 1st RB.

Montgomery's plan for Eighth Army's night attack at Alamein (Operation Lightfoot) on 23/24 October required XIII Corps to penetrate the enemy's two belts of minefields (codenamed 'January' and 'February') and then pass the armoured brigades through. For 22nd Armd Bde this involved an approach march of 13 miles (21 km) and then an advance of 6,000 yards (5,500 m) through four gaps, with its flank covered by 131st Infantry Bde. The Royal Engineers' mine-clearing parties moved forward when the artillery barrage began at 21.40 and had cleared the two southern gaps through 'January' by 02.30, but 1st RB's two advance guard companies had to subdue enemy post before the northern gaps could be completed. By 05.00 5th RTR and the two 1st RB companies were through 'January' by one gap or another, but the mine-clearing parties had suffered heavy casualties; they could only attempt two gaps through 'February', and these were frustrated by heavy fire and daylight. 22nd Armoured Brigade's casualties during the night were 200. The following morning the tanks had to sit in open formation under steady shellfire.

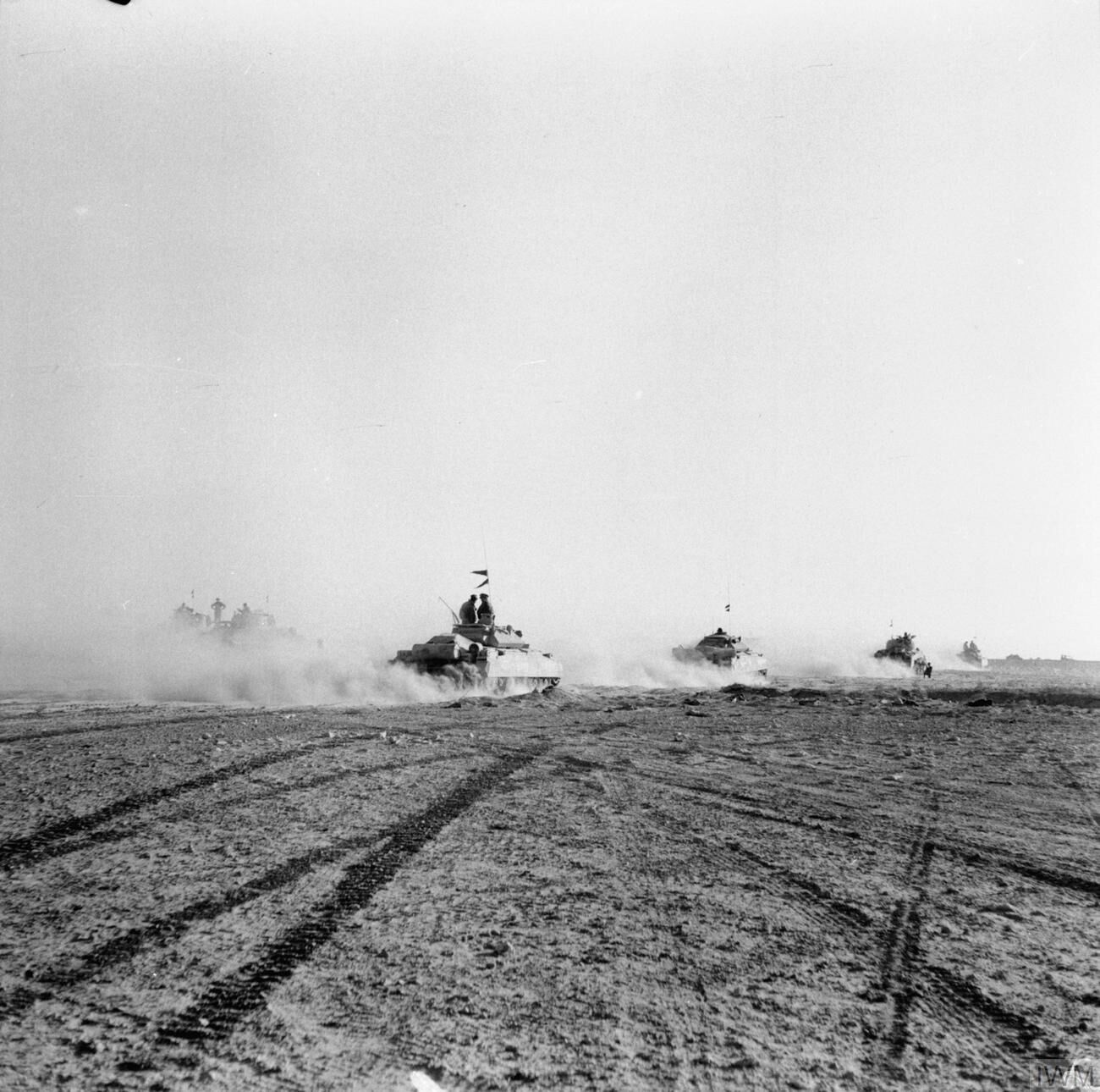
Crusader tanks advance through the minefield gaps on 24 October 1942.

Horrocks decided that as 7th Armd Division could not punch a hole through 'February', 131st Bde would have to make a night attack on 24/25 October supported by 22nd Armd Bde. The infantry got through the minefield but were pinned down just beyond it. 22nd Armoured Bde then attempted to pass along the two cleared lanes in bright moonlight but came under heavy A/T fire; 31 tanks were disabled and the attempt was called off. Montgomery then decided to concentrate on the more important attack by XXX Corps and turn XIII Corps over to the defensive. The attacks had achieved their purpose, however, pinning down 21st Panzer Division so that it did not move north to face XXX Corps until 26/27 October.

XIII Corps was then 'milked' to reinforce XXX Corps, so that by 1 November when the second phase of the battle (Operation Supercharge) began, 22nd Armd Bde only had 54 Grants, 16 Crusader IIs and 10 Crusader IIIs. Once again, its role was to feint.

=== Pursuit to Tripoli ===
Once the rest of Eighth Army had broken through, 7th Armd Division was launched in pursuit of the broken enemy, with 22nd Armd Bde in the lead. On 5 November it covered more than 50 miles (80 km), but ended the day still 20 miles (32 km) short of its objective, having encountered a dummy minefield and halted until it could be investigated. Moving off at first light next morning the brigade encountered German reconnaissance troops and then 21st Panzer Division, whose tanks were too short of fuel to manoeuvre. In a series of actions lasting most of 6 November, in heavy rain, the brigade inflicted considerable casualties; in the evening the enemy fled towards Matruh. After waiting for its own fuel, 22nd Armd Bde reached the Libyan frontier near El Beida on 10 November, ignoring fleeing German tanks as it closed on its objective of Fort Capuzzo. Next day the enemy were fleeing towards Bardia too fast to be caught.

After the victory of Alamein, Eighth Army advanced more slowly towards Tripoli, with 22nd Armd Bde in Army Reserve. Montgomery then decided to 'crash' through to Tripoli itself. On the night of 20/21 January 1943 Eighth Army made a thrust along the coast road towards the city with 51st (Highland) Division and 22nd Armd Bde. The Highlanders were closing on the city on 22 January and 2nd Armd came up 'pell-mell' to take the lead. Tripoli fell without fighting next day.

=== Tunisia ===
After Eighth Army had closed up to Tunisia 7th Armd Division was in the line when Panzer Army Afrika attacked XXX Corps at Medenine on 6 March. 22nd Armoured Bde was deployed in depth behind the division's infantry, but the Germans' clumsy armoured attack was mainly defeated by the British artillery and A/T guns.

In the Battle of Wadi Akarit on 6 April Eighth Army's infantry had to breach a formidable anti-tank obstacle. 51st (Highland) and 50th (Northumbrian) Divisions were each supported by a squadron provided by 4th CLY, which was now equipped with 29 Sherman tanks along with its 21 Crusaders. The assembly of the infantry divisions in the dark was complicated, but 51st (H) achieved its first objective easily. 50th (N) Division had a harder task, but 4th CLY's squadron was ordered round by a gap made by 51st (H) and was able to cut in behind the enemy. For the second phase 51st (H) Division's supporting infantry tanks were gradually picked off, and 4th CLY's squadron had to pass through to help out, but 50th (N) Division's squadron was able to pass its Shermans through its gap by 09.30. XXX Corps then settled down to consolidate the gap that it had made, and the enemy withdrew during the night.

The final phase of the Tunisian campaign began on 6 May with Operation Strike directed towards Tunis. After the infantry had broken into the Axis defence lines 7th Armoured Division was directed to dash ahead and break through the inner defences before the enemy had time to man them. 22nd Armoured Bde set off at 10.30 after 4th Indian Division had secured a vital knoll, and headed for the high ground. However the advance got slowed up, and by 17.00 7th Armoured had settled into a position about 8 miles (13 km) beyond the infantry. Next morning 22nd Armd Bde engaged a few scattered tanks and 88mm guns and disposed of them by 14.00. At 15.15 7th Armoured was ordered to close in on Tunis. Armoured car patrols reached the city centre at 15.40, closely followed by 1st RTR with 1/7th Bn Queen's from 131st Bde. They quelled any scattered resistance, secured all important building and bridges, and restored order. All remaining Axis forces in Tunisia were rounded up and surrendered unconditionally on 13 May.

== Italy ==
7th Armoured Division was not involved in the Allied invasion of Sicily (Operation Husky), instead it re-equipped and trained at Homs, east of Tripoli, before taking part in the landings at Salerno on the Italian mainland (Operation Avalanche). Leading elements of 7th Armd Division landed from the first follow-up convoy on 15 September, six days after the initial assault. 5th RTR accompanied the lorried infantry of 131st Bde in the division's first wave. However, there was still heavy fighting around the beachhead and the brigade group was unable to begin the intended breakout. The bulk of the division had arrived by 28 September when the advance began. 131st Brigade with 5th RTR took the lead through the close country, making slow progress, then after Naples had fallen to Allied troops 22nd Armd Bde took the lead on 2 October. 1st RTR found a way through the 'mass of rubble and demolitions' at Somma Vesuviana and over the next two days fought a series of actions with 1st RB to flush the enemy out of a number of towns. Despite all the bridges being blown, 1st RTR forced a crossing of the Regi Lagni drainage canal and closed up to the River Volturno.

The Royal Engineers could not find a suitable tank ford over the Volturno, so the infantry of 131st Bde had to force a bridgehead while 22nd Armd Bde waited. As the engineers worked on a bridge, the water level fell, and a suitable ford appeared, so a squadron of 4th CLY shovelled away the river bank and struggled across to support the infantry. However, torrential rain and mud made armoured action impossible off the roads. The Volturno was successfully bridged elsewhere and the Allied advance continued. On 22 October 5th RTR found Sparanise unoccupied and 1st RB cleared enemy observation posts from the hills above.

At the end of October, 7th Armoured Division was shifted to the left flank, nearest the sea, which entailed a tedious journey through Capua, where the bridge could only take one tank at a time. 1st Rifle Brigade took over the outpost line in front of the main enemy position on Monte Massico. If 7th Armoured could get along the coast road towards Mondragone it would outflank Monte Massico. Reconnaissance revealed a fordable crossing near the beach, so a squadron of 5th RTR advanced by this route on 1 November while the rest of the regiment supported 131st Bde's attack on Mondragone. A few tanks were lost to mines on the beach, but Mondragone was found to be clear and the Massico ridge was occupied at small cost, while the enemy withdrew across the Garigliano river. Next day the tanks, though heavily shelled and hampered by enemy demolitions, worked between the mountain and the sea and captured Cicola after a sharp fight.

The brigade had fought its last battle in Italy: shortly afterwards 7th Armd Division was withdrawn to the UK to take part in Operation Overlord, the Allied invasion of Normandy. It transferred its equipment to 5th Canadian Armoured Division and the personnel sailed from Naples to Glasgow, docking on 7 January 1944.

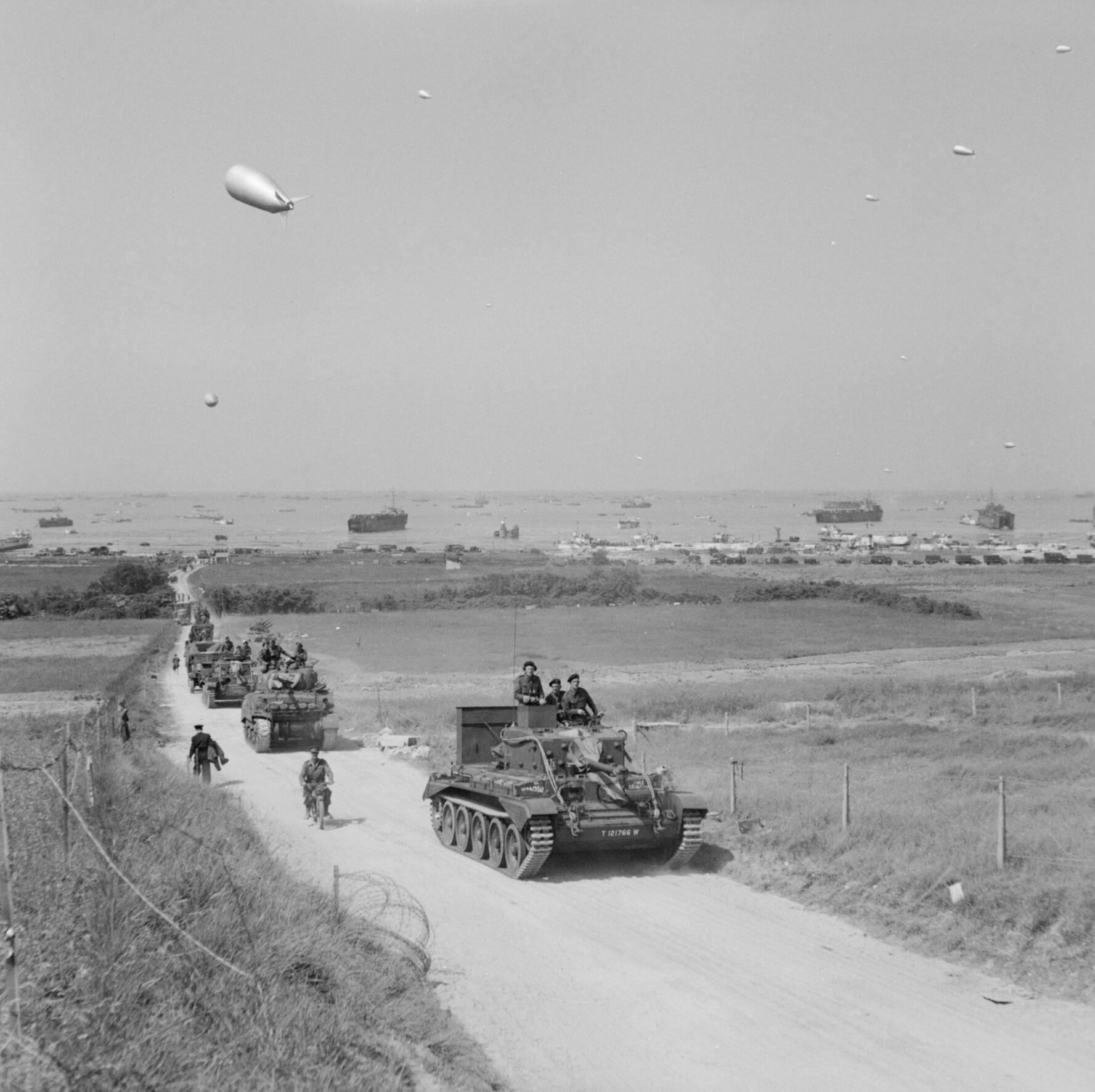
A Cromwell tank of 4th CLY leads a column inland from Gold Beach, 7 June 1944.

== North-West Europe ==
22nd Armoured Bde was re-equipped with Cromwell tanks and trained in the area round Brandon, Suffolk, to take part in the Allied landings in Normandy. The brigade was to sail in assault landing craft and land on D Day and D + 1, followed by the rest of 7th Armd Division. It embarked on Landing Craft Tank (LCTs) at Felixstowe on 4 June and landed successfully on Gold Beach during the morning of D + 1 (7 June).

=== Normandy ===
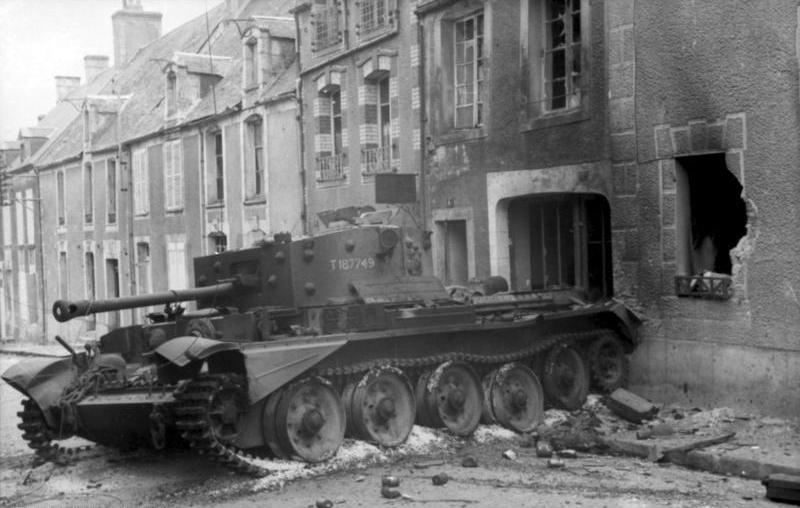
A knocked-out Cromwell tank in the streets of Villers-Bocage.

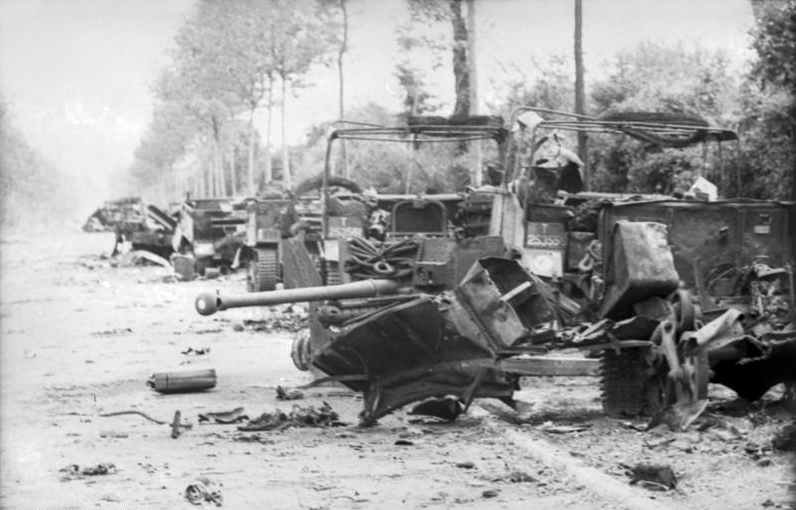
Destroyed vehicles of 1st Rifle Brigade's anti-tank platoon on the road outside Villers-Bocage.

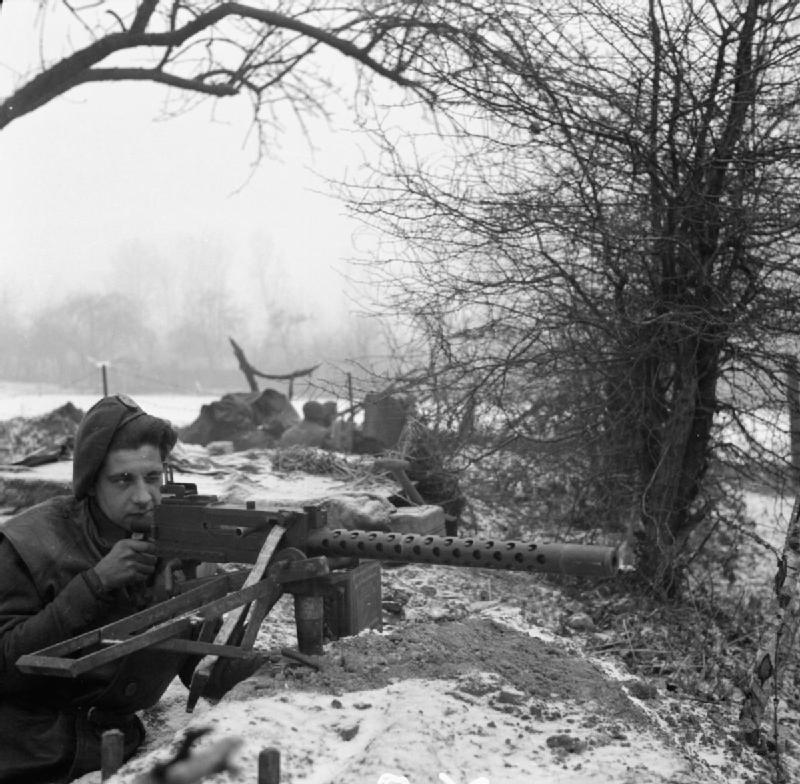
An infantryman of 1st Rifle Brigade manning a Browning machine gun, 31 December 1944.

On 10 June, 22nd Armoured Brigade led the division's advance towards Villers-Bocage during Operation Perch, but progress was slow through the restricted Bocage country. In an attempt to move around the flank of the Panzer Lehr Division, the division became embroiled the Battle of Villers-Bocage on 13 June. The brigade was ambushed by Tiger I tanks of 101st SS Heavy Panzer Battalion, and the 4th CLY lost around 14 tanks within a 15-minute period. A bitter battle then developed in and around the town before the brigade withdrew before nightfall. In July, the division was moved to the area north of Caen to take part in Operation Goodwood. The armour of VIII Corps crossed the River Orne on 18 July and attacked behind a massive artillery and air bombardment, but the 7th Armoured Division was caught in traffic congestion and barely got into action. The division was shifted west again to take part in Operation Bluecoat (1–2 August), but failed to gain its objective, the commanders of 7th Armoured Division and 22nd Armoured Brigade being sacked after this failure. The division came into its own after the breakout from the Normandy beachhead, when it advanced rapidly across northern France and Belgium, liberating towns as they went, including Ghent on 5 September.

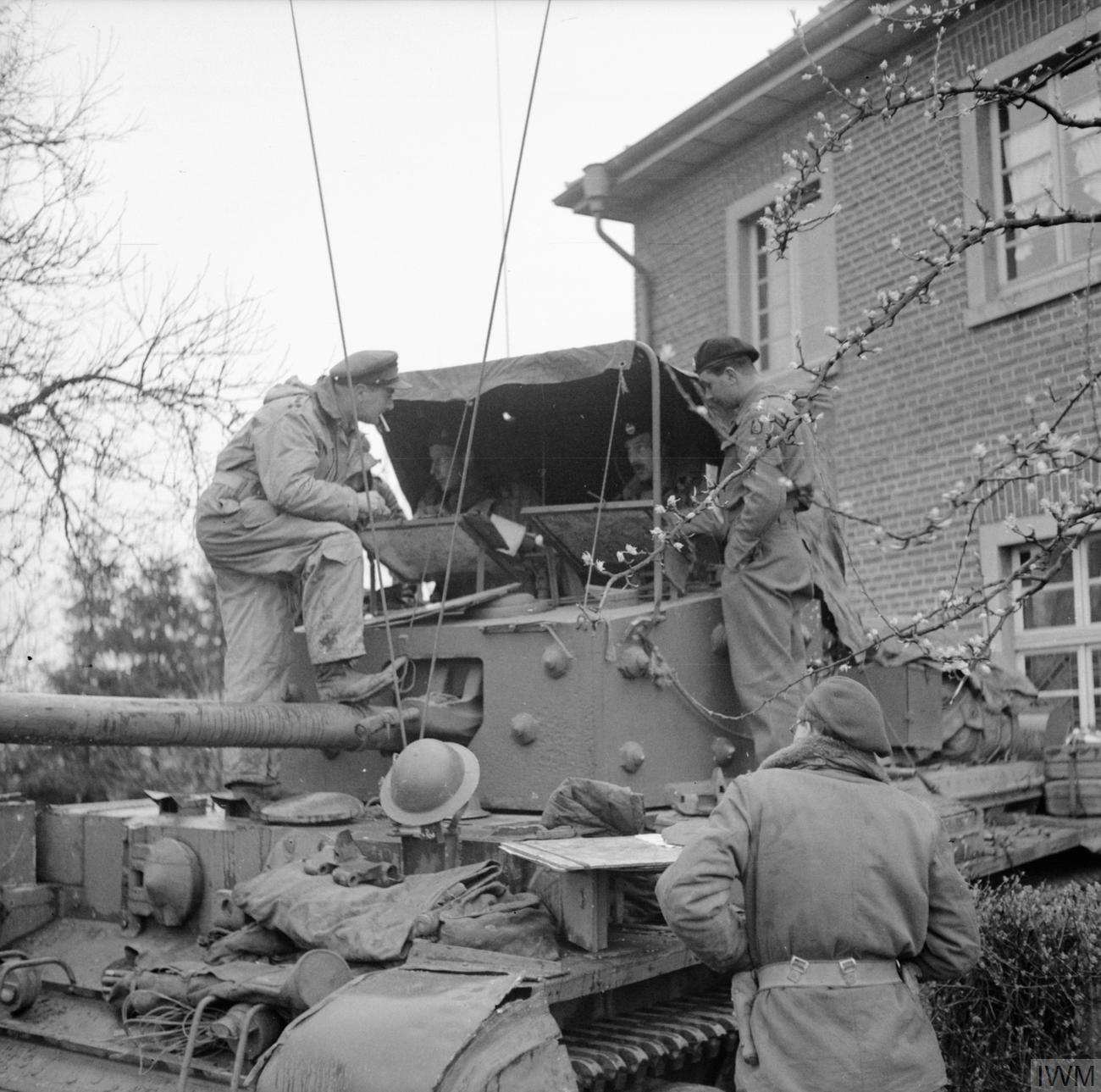
The Cromwell command tank of Brig Tony Wingfield, commanding 22nd Armoured Bde, 31 March 1945.

=== Low Countries and Germany ===
The rest of September and October was spent in probing operations while 21st Army Group's emphasis shifted to Antwerp and Operation Market Garden, where the division was called in to clear XXX Corps' severed supply lines. 22nd Armoured Brigade cooperated with 51st (Highland) Division around 's-Hertogenbosch, but much of the country was unsuitable for tanks. It was not until 13 January 1945 that the division participated in a major attack (Operation Blackcock) towards Roermond. The division then rested and prepared for the crossing of the Rhine, Operation Plunder. The infantry began their assault crossing on the night of 23/24 March, followed by an airborne landing (Operation Varsity) next day. By 27 March the engineers had bridged the river and 7th Armd began to cross. At first progress was slow, but on 29 March 22nd Armoured Brigade fanned out leading the advance; the division made 120 miles (190 km) by 2 April, only halted by the River Ems. 11th Armoured Division having captured a bridge intact, 22nd Armoured Brigade resumed its advance, now a pursuit. Hamburg surrendered to 7th Armoured Division on 3 May, and the German surrender at Lüneburg Heath followed next day.

== Second World War Order of Battle ==
The 22nd Armoured Brigade commanded the following units in the war:

Unit	From	To
2nd Royal Gloucestershire Hussars	3 September 1939	16 September 1942
3rd County of London Yeomanry (Sharpshooters)	3 September 1939	16 September 1942
4th County of London Yeomanry (Sharpshooters)	27 September 1939	29 July 1944
22nd Armoured Brigade Signal Squadron	4 March 1940	after 31 August 1945
2nd Battalion, The King's Royal Rifle Corps	23 November 1940	2 August 1941
10th Company, Royal Army Service Corps	1940	1941
50th Reconnaissance Regiment	16 February 1942	19 June 1942
1st Battalion, The Rifle Brigade	19 June 1942	after 31 August 1945
1st Royal Tank Regiment	17 September 1942	after 31 August 1945
5th Royal Tank Regiment	17 September 1942	after 31 August 1945**
5th Royal Inniskilling Dragoon Guards	29 July 1944	after 31 August 1945
** 5 RTR Detached to 53 Div and replaced by 8th Hussars.	April 1945	May 1945
1/5th The Queen's Royal Regiment attached from 131 Brigade	April 1945	May 1945

Supporting units of 22nd Armoured Brigade Group while an independent formation May–September 1942:

- 107th (South Nottinghamshire Hussars) Regiment, Royal Horse Artillery
- 2nd Regiment Royal Horse Artillery
- 1st Regiment Royal Horse Artillery
- Troop, 7 Field Squadron, Royal Engineers (RE)
- 13/7 Field Squadron, RE
- 20 Field Troop, RE
- Troop, 4 Field Squadron, RE
- 67 and 432 Companies, Royal Army Service Corps
- 2 Light Field Ambulance, Royal Army Medical Corps

== Brigade commanders ==
The following officers commanded the brigade during the Second World War:

- Brigadier J. Scott-Cockburn, 3 September 1939
- Brigadier W.G. Carr, 8 February 1942
- Brigadier A.F. Fisher, 7 July 1942
- Brigadier G.P.B. 'Pip' Roberts, 27 July 1942
- Colonel D.S. Newton-King 20 January 1943 (acting)
- Brigadier W.R.N. 'Loony' Hinde, 23 January 1943
- Lieutenant-Colonel G.P. Gregson, 7 August 1944 (acting)
- Brigadier H.R. Mackeson, 10 August 1944
- Lieutenant-Colonel J.E. Swetenham, 11 September 1944 (acting)
- Brigadier H.T.B. Cracroft, 16 September 1944
- Lieutenant-Colonel A. G. V. Paley, 7 October 1944 (acting)
- Brigadier A.D.R. 'Tony' Wingfield, 18 October 1944

== Postwar ==
When the Territorial Army was reconstituted in 1947, the 22nd Armoured Brigade was reformed as the armoured component of 56th (London) Armoured Division, with the following organisation:

- City of London Yeomanry (Rough Riders)
- Westminster Dragoons (2nd County of London Yeomanry)
- 3rd/4th County of London Yeomanry (Sharpshooters)
- 42nd Royal Tank Regiment
- Queen Victoria's Rifles (King's Royal Rifle Corps)
- Inns of Court Regiment (armoured cars)
- 303 Signal Squadron (Armoured Brigade), Royal Corps of Signals

56th (London) Armoured Division was reformed as an infantry division in 1956, and most of the Yeomanry regiments underwent mergers in the reduced TA.

From 1960 to 1961, the Brigade was commanded by Brigadier The Marquess of Druro LVO OBE MC, later the 8th Duke of Wellington.

22nd Armoured Brigade's identity was reinstated during the Cold War by converting Task Force Bravo (which had been created four years earlier from the 11th Armoured Brigade) into an armoured brigade in 1981. It was assigned to the 1st Armoured Division and based at Campbell Barracks in Hohne. It disbanded in 1993 following the end of the Cold War. From November 1984 until the brigade disbanded, 1st Royal Tank Regiment once more formed part of 22nd Armoured Brigade, based at Tofrek Barracks Hildesheim, and equipped with Chieftain Tanks.

== See also ==
- British Armoured formations of World War II
- List of British brigades of the Second World War
- British Army Order of Battle (September 1939)

== Bibliography ==
- Bellis, Malcolm A. (1994). Regiments of the British Army 1939–1945 (Armour & Infantry). London: Military Press International. ISBN 0-85420-999-9.
- Basil Collier, History of the Second World War, United Kingdom Military Series: The Defence of the United Kingdom, London: HM Stationery Office, 1957.
- L.F. Ellis, History of the Second World War, United Kingdom Military Series: Victory in the West, Vol I: The Battle of Normandy, London: HM Stationery Office, 1962/Uckfield: Naval & Military, 2004, ISBN 1-845740-58-0.
- L.F. Ellis, History of the Second World War, United Kingdom Military Series: Victory in the West, Vol II: The Defeat of Germany, London: HM Stationery Office, 1968/Uckfield: Naval & Military, 2004, ISBN 1-845740-59-9.
- Martin Farndale, History of the Royal Regiment of Artillery: The Years of Defeat: Europe and North Africa, 1939–1941, Woolwich: Royal Artillery Institution, 1988/London: Brasseys, 1996, ISBN 1-85753-080-2.
- J.B.M. Frederick, Lineage Book of British Land Forces 1660–1978, Vol I, Wakefield, Microform Academic, 1984, ISBN 1-85117-007-3.
- Sir Brian Horrocks, A Full Life, London: Collins, 1960.
- Eric Hunt, Battleground Europe: Normandy: Mont Pinçon, Barnsley: Leo Cooper, 2003, ISBN 0-85052-944-1.
- Joslen, H. F. (2003) [1960]. Orders of Battle: Second World War, 1939–1945. Uckfield, East Sussex: Naval and Military Press. ISBN 978-1-84342-474-1..
- Martin Lindsay and Capt M..E. Johnstone, History of 7th Armoured Division June 1943–July 1945, British Army of the Rhine, 1945.
- Cliff Lord & Graham Watson, Royal Corps of Signals: Unit Histories of the Corps (1920–2001) and its Antecedents, Solihull: Helion, 2003, ISBN 1-874622-92-2.
- C.J.C. Molony,History of the Second World War, United Kingdom Military Series: The Mediterranean and Middle East, Vol V: The Campaign in Sicily 1943 and the Campaign in Italy 3rd September 1943 to 31st March 1944, London: HM Stationery Office, 1973/Uckfield, Naval & Military Press, 2004, ISBN 1-845740-69-6.
- The Memoirs of Field Marshal Viscount Montgomery of Alamein, London: Collins, 1958.
- Maj-Gen I.S.O. Playfair, History of the Second World War, United Kingdom Military Series: The Mediterranean and Middle East, Vol I: The Early Successes against Italy (to May 1941), London: HM Stationery Office, 1954/Uckfield, Naval & Military Press, 2004, ISBN 1-845740-65-3.
- Maj-Gen I.S.O. Playfair, History of the Second World War, United Kingdom Military Series: The Mediterranean and Middle East, Vol II: The Germans come to the aid of their Ally (1941), London: HM Stationery Office, 1956/Uckfield, Naval & Military Press, 2004, ISBN 1-845740-66-1.
- I.S.O. Playfair, History of the Second World War, United Kingdom Military Series: The Mediterranean and Middle East, Vol III: (September 1941 to September 1942) British Fortunes reach their Lowest Ebb, London: HM Stationery Office, 1960 /Uckfield, Naval & Military Press, 2004, ISBN 1-845740-67-X.
- I.S.O. Playfair & Brig C.J.C. Molony, History of the Second World War, United Kingdom Military Series: The Mediterranean and Middle East, Vol IV: The Destruction of the Axis forces in Africa, London: HM Stationery Office, 1966/Uckfield, Naval & Military Press, 2004, ISBN 1-845740-68-8.
- John Sutton (ed.), Wait for the Waggon: The Story of the Royal Corps of Transport and its Predecessors 1794–1993, Barnsley: Leo Cooper, 1998, ISBN 0-85052-625-6.
