= Arthur Fisher (British Army officer) =

British Army officer

Major-General Arthur Fisher CBE DSO
- Born: 11 July 1899
- Died: 28 August 1972 (aged 73)
- Military career
- Allegiance: United Kingdom
- Branch: British Army
- Service years: 1918–1952
- Rank: Major-General
- Service number: 15850
- Units: Royal Field Artillery; Royal Artillery
- Commands: East Riding of Yorkshire Yeomanry; 1st Armoured Brigade; 4th Armoured Brigade; 4th Armoured Brigade l
- Conflicts: Second World War
- Awards: Commander of the Order of the British Empire; Distinguished Service Order

Major-General Arthur Francis Fisher, CBE, DSO (11 July 1899 – 28 August 1972) was a British Army officer who served as acting General Officer Commanding 1st Armoured Division during the Second World War.

== Military career ==
After attending the Royal Military Academy, Woolwich, Fisher was commissioned into the Royal Field Artillery on 6 June 1918.

He attended the Staff College, Camberley from 1935 to 1936.

He became commanding officer of the East Riding of Yorkshire Yeomanry in 1940 and went on to see action in North Africa, becoming commander of 1st Armoured Brigade in March 1942, commander of 4th Armoured Brigade in June 1942 and commander of 22nd Armoured Brigade in July 1942.

He briefly became acting General Officer Commanding 1st Armoured Division when Major-General Alexander Gatehouse was wounded in action in North Africa on 22 July 1942 and remained in the role until relieved on 15 August 1942. He was appointed a Companion of the Distinguished Service Order on 17 June 1943. He then became commander of 2nd Armoured Brigade in North Africa later in August 1942 and led his brigade at the Second Battle of El Alamein in October 1942 before becoming Brigadier Royal Armoured Corps for the 2nd Army in 1943 and then deputy director of the Royal Armoured Corps at the War Office in November 1944.
