= List of highways numbered 80 =

The following highways are numbered 80:

== International ==
- E80 European route E80
- Arab Mashreq route M80

== Australia ==
- Buchanan Highway
- Burleigh Connection Road – Queensland State Route 80
- M80 Ring Road, North East Link (under construction) (Melbourne)
- (South Australia)

=== Decommissioned Routes ===
- – Monaro Highway (Now)

== Belgium ==
- N80 road (Belgium)

== Brazil ==
- BR-080

== Canada ==
- Newfoundland and Labrador Route 80
- Saskatchewan Highway 80
- Winnipeg Route 80

== China ==
- G80 Expressway

== Finland ==
- Finnish national road 80

== France ==
- N80 road (France)

== Germany ==
- Bundesstraße 80

== Greece ==
- EO80 road

== India ==
- NH 80

== Ireland ==
- N80 road (Ireland)

== Israel ==
- Highway 80 (Israel)

== Jordan ==
- Highway 80

== Korea, South ==
- National Route 80

== Kuwait ==
- Highway 80 (Kuwait)

== Mexico ==
- Mexican Federal Highway 80

== New Zealand ==
- New Zealand State Highway 80

== Philippines ==
- N80 highway (Philippines)

== South Africa ==
- R80 road

== Spain ==
- Autovía A-80
- Autovía CV-80

== United Arab Emirates ==
- D 80 road (United Arab Emirates)

== United Kingdom ==
- A80 road (Scotland)
- M80 motorway

== United States ==
- Interstate 80
  - Interstate 80N (former; four highways)
  - Interstate 80S (former; two highways)
- U.S. Route 80
- County Route 80 (Lee County, Alabama)
- Arizona State Route 80
- Arkansas Highway 80
- Connecticut Route 80
- Florida State Road 80
  - County Road 80A (Hendry County, Florida)
- Georgia State Route 80
- Hawaii Route 80
- Illinois Route 80 (former)
- K-80 (Kansas highway)
- Kentucky Route 80
- Maryland Route 80
  - Maryland Route 80A (former)
  - Maryland Route 80B (former)
  - Maryland Route 80C (former)
- Massachusetts Route 80
- M-80 (Michigan highway)
- Minnesota State Highway 80
- Missouri Route 80
  - Missouri Route 80 (1922) (former)
- Montana Highway 80
- Nebraska Highway 80 (former)
  - Nebraska Link 80E
  - Nebraska Link 80F
  - Nebraska Link 80G
  - Nebraska Link 80H
  - Nebraska Spur 80B
  - Nebraska Spur 80C
  - Nebraska Spur 80D
- Nevada State Route 80 (former)
- County Route 80 (Bergen County, New Jersey)
- New Mexico State Road 80
- New York State Route 80
  - County Route 80 (Dutchess County, New York)
  - County Route 80 (Madison County, New York)
  - County Route 80 (Montgomery County, New York)
  - County Route 80 (Onondaga County, New York)
  - County Route 80 (Rockland County, New York)
    - County Route 80A (Rockland County, New York)
  - County Route 80 (Saratoga County, New York)
  - County Route 80 (Schenectady County, New York)
  - County Route 80 (Suffolk County, New York)
  - County Route 80A (Westchester County, New York)
- North Carolina Highway 80
- Ohio State Route 80 (former)
- Oklahoma State Highway 80
  - Oklahoma State Highway 80A
- Pennsylvania Route 80 (former)
- South Carolina Highway 80
- Tennessee State Route 80
- Texas State Highway 80
  - Texas State Highway Spur 80
  - Farm to Market Road 80
- Utah State Route 80 (1935–1977) (former)
- Virginia State Route 80
- West Virginia Route 80
- Wisconsin Highway 80

Territories

- U.S. Virgin Islands Highway 80

== See also ==
- A80

Preceded by 79	Lists of highways 80	Succeeded by 81
