= AAT =

AAT or Aat may refer to:

== Biochemistry ==
- Alpha 1-antitrypsin, also α1-antitrypsin (A1AT), a glycoprotein
- Aspartate transaminase, or aspartate aminotransferase, an enzyme
- AAT, a codon for the amino acid asparagine

== Places ==
=== Transport infrastructure ===
- Achanalt railway station
- Asia Airfreight Terminal, Hong Kong International Airport
- Altay Xuedu Airport in Xinjiang Region, China (IATA airport code AAT)
- Alturas Municipal Airport, California, US (Location identifier AAT)

=== Other places ===
- Ath, Belgium (Dutch: Aat)
- Australian Antarctic Territory
- AutoAlliance Thailand, a joint venture automobile manufacturing plant

== Science and technology ==
- Anglo-Australian Telescope
- Animal-assisted therapy
- Apple Advanced Typography, a font rendering technology
- Aquatic Ape Theory, a theory in human evolution
- Ancient astronauts, or ancient astronaut theory

== Other uses ==
- Aat (queen), an ancient Egyptian queen consort of the 12th dynasty
- Administrative Appeals Tribunal, in Australia
- And Another Thing (disambiguation)
- Art & Architecture Thesaurus, a controlled vocabulary used for describing items of art
- Association of Accounting Technicians, a professional member body
- Arvanitika, a variety of Albanian spoken in Greece
- The Bible, An American Translation
- Armored Assault Tank, a Separatist tank in the prequel era of the Star Wars universe
- Hong Kong Academic Aptitude Test, a standardized examination from 1978 to 2000

== See also ==
- A80 (disambiguation)
