= Robert Peake =

Robert Peake may refer to:

- Robert Peake the Elder (c. 1551–1619), English painter
- Sir Robert Peake (printer) (c. 1592–1667), print-seller and royalist
- Robert Peake (British Army officer) (born 1903), British brigadier
