= SSEE =

SSEE can refer to:

- Secondary School Entrance Examination, in Hong Kong
- Secondary School Entrance Examination, the predecessor to the Primary School Leaving Examination in Singapore
- Swiss Society for Environmental Engineering, within the Confederation of European Environmental Engineering Societies
- Smith School of Enterprise and the Environment, within the University of Oxford in the UK
- Ship Signal Exploitation Equipment, aboard several ships:
  - HMS Daring (D32)
  - HMS Dauntless (D33)
  - HMS Diamond (D34)
  - HMS Dragon (D35)
  - HMS Defender (D36)
  - HMS Duncan (D37)
