= 1st Armoured Division (United Kingdom) =

British Army formation, 1937-45 and 1978-2014

Mobile Division 1st Armoured Division
- Active: 1937–1945, 1978-2014
- Country: United Kingdom
- Branch: British Army
- Type: Armour
- Size: 9,442–14,964 men c. 350 tanks (Note: These figures represent the war establishment, the paper strength, of an armoured division. In 1939, an armoured division was to have 9,442 men, close to 400 guns, 351 tanks and about 3,000 vehicles. By 1944, a division was supposed to have 14,964 men, 126 guns, 366 tanks and around 4,000 vehicles. Various organisational changes were introduced throughout the war that changed the composition of armoured divisions. More information can be found at British Army during the Second World War and British armoured formations of the Second World War.)
- Engagements: Battle of France; Western Desert Campaign; Tunisian Campaign; Gothic Line

Commanders
- Notable commanders: Herbert Lumsden

Insignia
- First divisional insignia adopted

The 1st Armoured Division was an armoured division of the British Army. It was formed as the Mobile Division on 24 November 1937, after several years of debate on the creation of such a formation. It was then renamed, in April 1939, the 1st Armoured Division. Following the start of the Second World War, in September 1939, subordinate units and formations were withdrawn from the division to reinforce others. Then, in May 1940, the division was deployed to France and then fought in the Battle of France. After several engagements and heavy tank losses, it was forced to withdraw to the UK, in June, during Operation Aerial. In late 1941, the division was sent to North Africa where it took part in the Western Desert campaign, notably fighting at the Battle of Gazala, and the First and the Second Battles of El Alamein.

The division then fought in the Tunisian campaign until the Axis defeat in North Africa in May 1943. It was during this period that it was temporarily renamed the 1st British Armoured Division, to avoid it being confused with the American 1st Armored Division. With the conclusion of fighting in Tunisia, the division remained in North Africa until 1944. In May, it started to move to Italy to fight in the Italian campaign. Between late August and the end of September, the division fought in several engagements as part of the Allied assault on the German Gothic Line. Due to a manpower shortage in the British Army, the division was broken up to provide reinforcements for other formations to keep them at full strength. In October 1944, the division relinquished command of its final troops and ceased to be an operational formation. It was disbanded on 11 January 1945, and reformed again in 1946 but disbanded in 1947, and then reformed again in 1978.

== Background and formation ==
During the interwar period, the British Army examined the lessons it learnt during the First World War and determined there was a need to experiment with and develop theories of manoeuvre and armoured warfare. The short-lived Experimental Mechanized Force was created and the army moved towards mechanisation to improve its battlefield mobility. During the early 1930s, General Archibald Montgomery-Massingberd, the Chief of the Imperial General Staff (CIGS), advocated for the formation of a tank-based force, dubbed a Mobile Division, that would be used to screen the advance of the British Expeditionary Force (BEF), as had the Cavalry Division in 1914. In early 1937, British planners assumed a European war would be fought against Germany, and a BEF would be dispatched to Europe to supplement Franco-Belgian forces. The BEF was to consist of one mobile and four infantry divisions. The former would ideally be dispatched seven days into such a war and around one week ahead of the infantry. By the end of the year, the timetable had been updated to the entire force being ready to embark 21 days into a war.

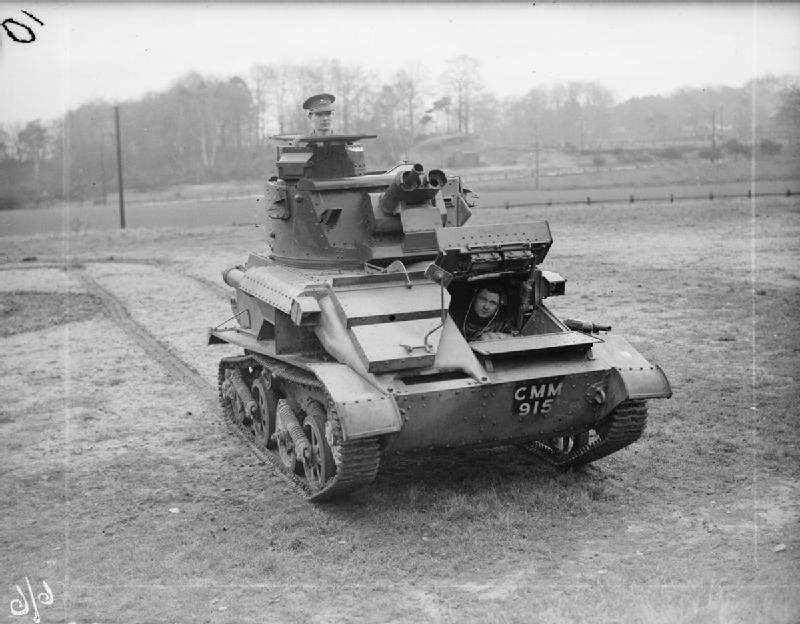
A Vickers Mk VI light tank of the 3rd (The King's Own) Hussars, c. 1937, the main tank of the 1st and 2nd Light Brigades

During 1937, the army was split on how to implement an armoured formation. General John Burnett-Stuart argued for a formation of cavalry regiments, equipped with light tanks, to be used in a screening role. Colonel Percy Hobart, deputy director for staff studies, favoured a more-balanced force that would include light tanks, more-heavily armoured-and-armed tanks, mechanised infantry, and supporting arms. B. H. Liddell Hart, a military theorist, supported this idea and influenced Leslie Hore-Belisha, the Secretary of State for War, on the subject. The division announced in November was based on Hobart's idea. The Mobile Division was formed with six light-tank regiments that were split between the 1st Light and the 2nd Light Armoured Brigades; three regiments of medium tanks that formed the Tank Brigade; two motorised infantry battalions, and two artillery regiments. It was intended for the formation to be 620-armoured-vehicles strong, but it had only around one-eighth of these vehicles on formation. The lack of armoured vehicles resulted in trucks being used for training in lieu of tanks. David French, a historian who wrote about the development of the British Army during this period, commented that cavalry officers largely supported mechanisation, but resisted turning their regiments into motorised infantry. They argued that light tanks were a better replacement for horses, and allowed the regiments to continue their traditional reconnaissance role. French stated that this had a detrimental effect on the Mobile Division, which became 'tank heavy' with too few supporting infantry and the light-tank regiments exclusively committed to reconnaissance. A rhinoceros, being the most-heavily-armoured animal, was chosen as the divisional insignia. The design included a white standing rhinoceros on a black oval.

There was a dispute over command following the creation of the division. General Cyril Deverell, now CIGS, favoured Major-General John Blakiston-Huston, who was a cavalry officer. Deverell believed Blakiston-Houston an appropriate choice, considering most of the forces assigned to the division came from cavalry regiments. Hore-Belisha and senior army officers opposed this; Liddell Hart argued for an officer from the Royal Tank Corps such as Hobart, Frederick Alfred Pile, or Charles Broad, on the basis experience with tanks and armoured warfare was needed. In a compromise, Major-General Alan Brooke, who had served in the artillery but had no prior experience in mobile forces or their training, was appointed to command on 24 November 1937.

Thereafter, the army established three types of divisions and solidified the role of the mobile division. Infantry divisions would penetrate the enemy's defensive line with the support of infantry tanks. Mobile divisions would then exploit any gaps created and the territory captured would be secured by fast-moving motor divisions (motorised infantry). It was envisioned this would transform the attack into a breakthrough and maintain mobility. Burnett-Stuart, who had been responsible for the training of the Mobile Division, influenced its doctrine. He argued the assigned infantry were not "to be put on to a position by tanks and told to hold it, and they are not meant to fight side by side with your tanks in the forefront"; the infantry's role was simply to protect the tanks when they were stationary. Burnett-Stuart's tactics did not conform with British doctrine, which promoted combined-arms co-operation to win battles, as did German armoured warfare doctrine that believed tanks alone would not be a decisive weapon. Burnett-Stuart's thinking, however, predominated within the British armoured forces until a doctrine reformation occurred in 1942.

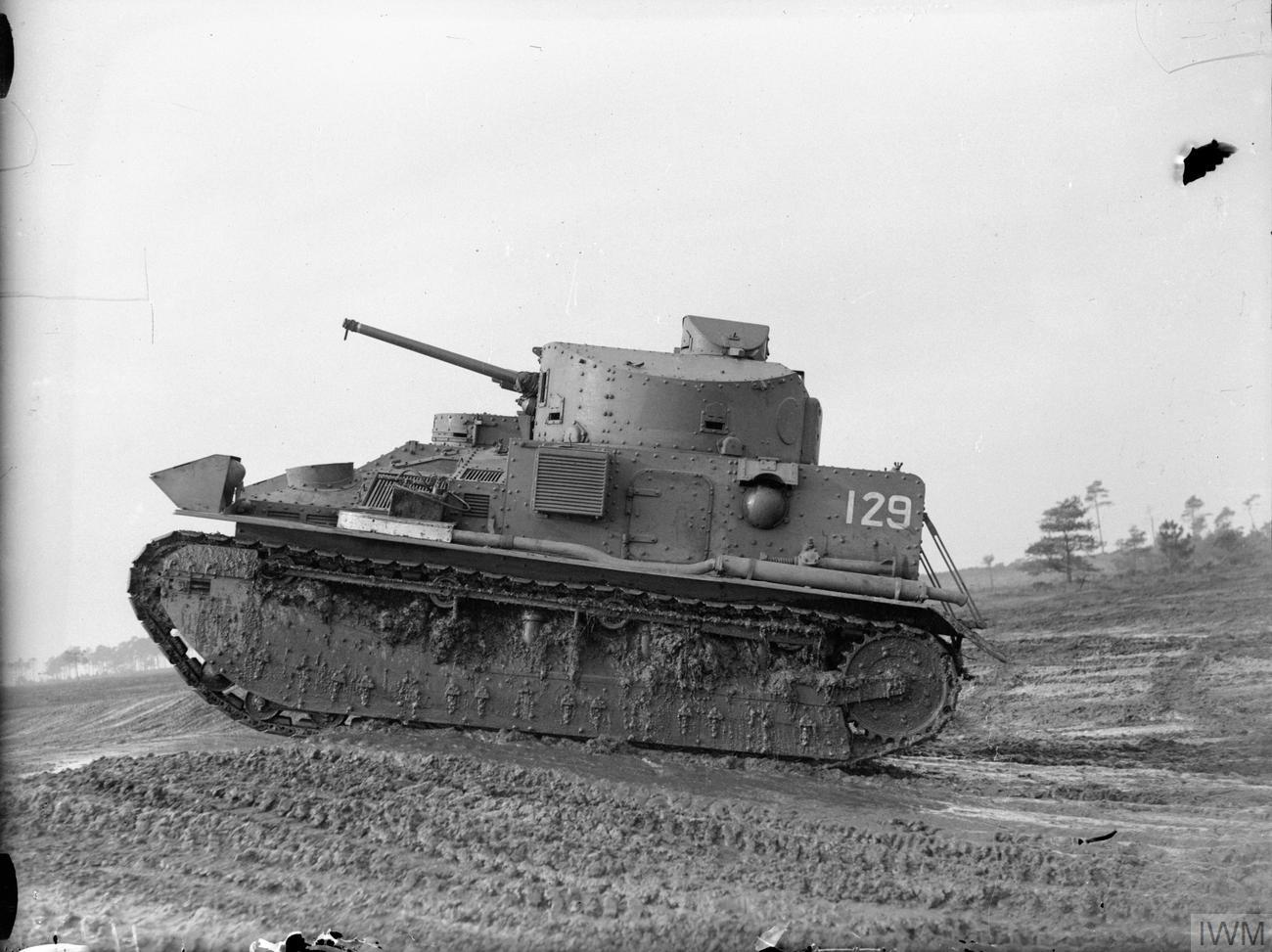
An example of the Vickers Medium Mark II, an obsolete tank by 1938, and what the Tank Brigade was initially equipped with

On 15 July 1938, Major-General Roger Evans, a cavalry officer, took command of the division following the promotion of Brooke. By this point, the Vickers Medium Mark II, which was the main weapon system of the tank brigade, was considered obsolete. Starting in December, the first deliveries of modern cruiser tanks arrived to replace them. During January 1939, Hore-Belisha proposed splitting the Mobile Division into two smaller formations but found no support. The issue was again broached a month later, and was accepted in principle by the Cabinet. (Note: Liddell Hart advocated for the complete restructure of the BEF into a force of just two mobile divisions. He argued such a force would benefit the French more than four additional infantry divisions.) Shortly after, the French government was informed of a preliminary timetable for the arrival of the BEF in the event of war; "One Regular Armoured Division will become available about the middle of 1940".

In April 1939, the formation was renamed as the 1st Armoured Division. The following month, the army developed a new organisation for such formations; they were intended to have one light-armoured brigade with 108 light tanks and 66 light cruisers, and one heavy-armoured brigade outfitted with 78 light cruisers, 45 heavy cruisers, and 24 tanks equipped to provide close support. Additionally, 13 heavy cruisers and 15 light cruisers were to be spread around the divisional and brigade headquarters. This would give such a division a total of 349 tanks. The division's support group was to have one artillery regiment, one anti-aircraft/anti-tank regiment, engineers, and two infantry battalions. (Note: British doctrine defined light tanks as reconnaissance vehicles armed only with machine guns. Cruiser tanks were swift moving, more heavily armoured, and equipped with both a machine gun and an anti-tank gun. The primary role of the cruiser tank was to engage and destroy opposing armoured forces. Its main weapon, a 2-pounder anti-tank gun, was only supplied with armour-piercing rounds. This meant cruiser tanks were ineffective against entrenched infantry, or in suppressing hostile artillery. The A9 provides an example of the light cruiser, and the A10 an example of a heavy cruiser. Close-support tanks were cruisers equipped with a howitzer rather than an anti-tank gun, for firing smoke and high explosive rounds, and were not intended to fight other tanks.)

== Second World War ==
=== Battle of France ===
At the outbreak of the Second World War on 3 September 1939, the division consisted of the 1st Light, the 1st Heavy (formerly the Tank Brigade) and the 2nd Light Armoured Brigades. During October that year, the support group's two regiments of artillery were withdrawn and dispatched to France to join the BEF. The following month, the 1st Light Brigade was removed and used to form the 2nd Armoured Division over the following months. This re-organisation left the division with 190 light and 25 cruiser tanks. During the same period, the Commander-in-Chief, Home Forces, General Sir Walter Kirke developed Julius Caesar, a plan to defend the UK from a potential German invasion. Under this plan, the 1st Armoured Division was to be within a short distance of the East Anglian coast, which was assumed to be the country's most vulnerable point. The 2nd Light Brigade and the support group were located in west Suffolk and north-west Essex while the heavy brigade was based further inland in Hertfordshire. A small number of tanks and an infantry company were maintained as a separate unit to counter any small Fallschirmjäger (German paratrooper) landings. During January 1940, with the risk of a landing reduced due to winter, the division concentrated for training in Dorset. On 14 April, the 2nd Light Armoured Brigade was renamed the 2nd Armoured Brigade and the 1st Heavy Brigade became the 3rd Armoured Brigade. Later in the month, the infantry of the support group were transferred to the 30th Infantry Brigade. By 3 May 1940, the division had 203 light and 121 cruiser tanks and it was hoped it would be able to cross the English Channel to France and finalise its training at Pacy-sur-Eure, Normandy.

The operating area of the various Allied formations are shown in blue. The German formations are shown in red. The red area denotes the territory captured by Germany by 21 May 1940

On 10 May 1940, the Phoney War—the period of inactivity on the Western Front since the start of the conflict—ended as the Germans invaded Belgium and the Netherlands. As the Allied forces advanced to meet the invasion, the main German attack came via the Ardennes Forest and continued into France. This invasion split the Allied forces in Belgium from the rest of the French Army along the Franco-German border. The 1st Armoured Division, now 114 light and 143 cruiser tanks strong, was still in Dorset and was ordered to France. The division lacked spare parts and bridging equipment, did not have all of its wireless equipment, lacked a full complement of anti-tank or anti-aircraft guns, and had no tank reserves to replace losses. An advance party landed at Le Havre on May 15 and moved to Arras. Approaching German forces, coupled with aerial attacks on Le Havre and the mining of the port resulted in the decision to unload the rest of the division at Cherbourg. On 19 May, the first meaningful elements landed. On 22 May, the 3rd Armoured Brigade had one of its regiments removed and transferred to the 30th Infantry Brigade. (Note: The brigade subsequently fought at Calais.)

The division was ordered to seize and hold bridges across the Somme between Picquigny and Pont-Remy, and was then to support the BEF as circumstances dictated. The leading elements of the division arrived near Rouen on 22 May. The following day, still not fully concentrated, Evans and his staff were aware up to six panzer divisions (armoured divisions) were on the east side of the Somme, although they were believed to have been greatly weakened by the fighting of their advance. They also held the impression that the Battle of Arras, which had occurred two days earlier and had already concluded, had sparked a general Anglo-French counterattack. In actuality, ten German divisions were operating in this area, were not as weakened as British command believed, had already seized and reinforced bridgeheads across the Somme, and had completed the encirclement of the BEF. Conflicting orders were issued; the BEF ordered the division to advance on the Somme with haste and with whatever units were available, then continue to Saint-Pol to "cut the rear of the enemy who are about St Omer and relieve the threat to the right of the BEF". Général Alphonse Joseph Georges, commander of all French forces operating in the north-east of the country, ordered the 1st Armoured Division to move towards Abbeville and clear the area of German forces, which were implied to be in small numbers. After completing this task, they were to move towards the BEF and provide it with flanking cover. The French Seventh Army gave a third set of instructions, which stated the division was under their command and was to provide that army with flanking protection for an attack on Amiens. Evans held the opinion that his force was unable to achieve any of these missions due to the lack of infantry and supporting arms and that his division had still not assembled.

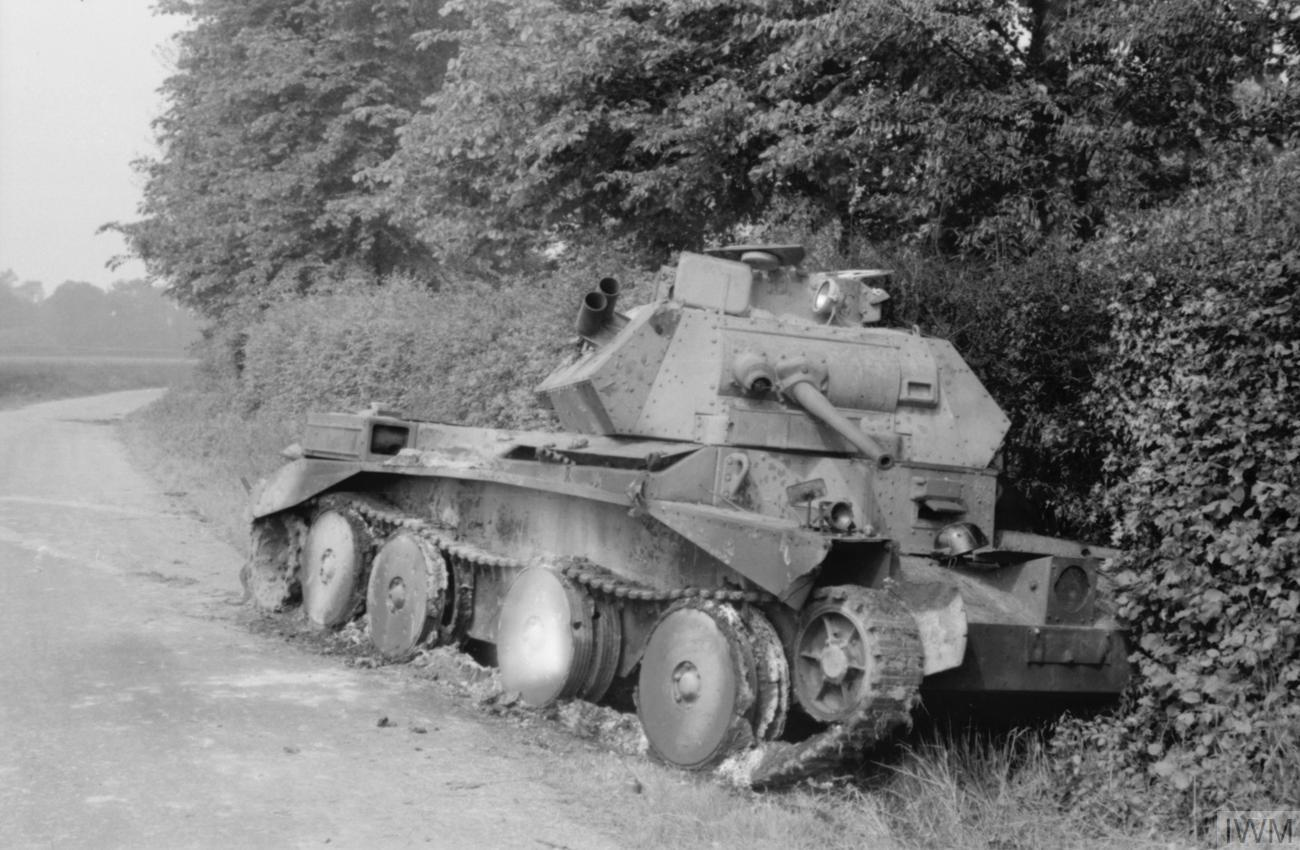
A Cruiser Mk IV knocked out during the fighting on 27 May

The first elements of the 2nd Armoured Brigade reached the Somme around 01:00 on 24 May. Two tanks were lost due to anti-tank mines, and the brigade found the bridges to be well-guarded. A few hours later, the brigade was reinforced with the 4th Battalion, Border Regiment, and a second attempt was made against three crossings. Numerous tanks and men were lost attempting to reach two, with the attacks repulsed. At Ailly-sur-Somme, near Amiens, men from the 4th Borderers secured a bridgehead. The bridge was destroyed, the attack called off, and the Borderers withdrawn. By the end of the day, the division was ordered to hold its positions. On 26 May, after receiving orders from London to come under French command and the division having finally completed its landing in France, Evans was ordered to split his force. The 2nd Armoured Brigade moved to Biencourt to support the French 2nd Light Cavalry Division, while the 3rd Armoured Brigade went to Buigny to supplement the French 5th Light Cavalry Division. The following day, this force began the Battle of Abbeville on dug-in German positions guarding several bridgeheads. Tank attacks, without infantry or other supporting arms, resulted in the division losing 65 tanks. Fifty-five more suffered mechanical breakdowns, due to the lack of maintenance since landing.

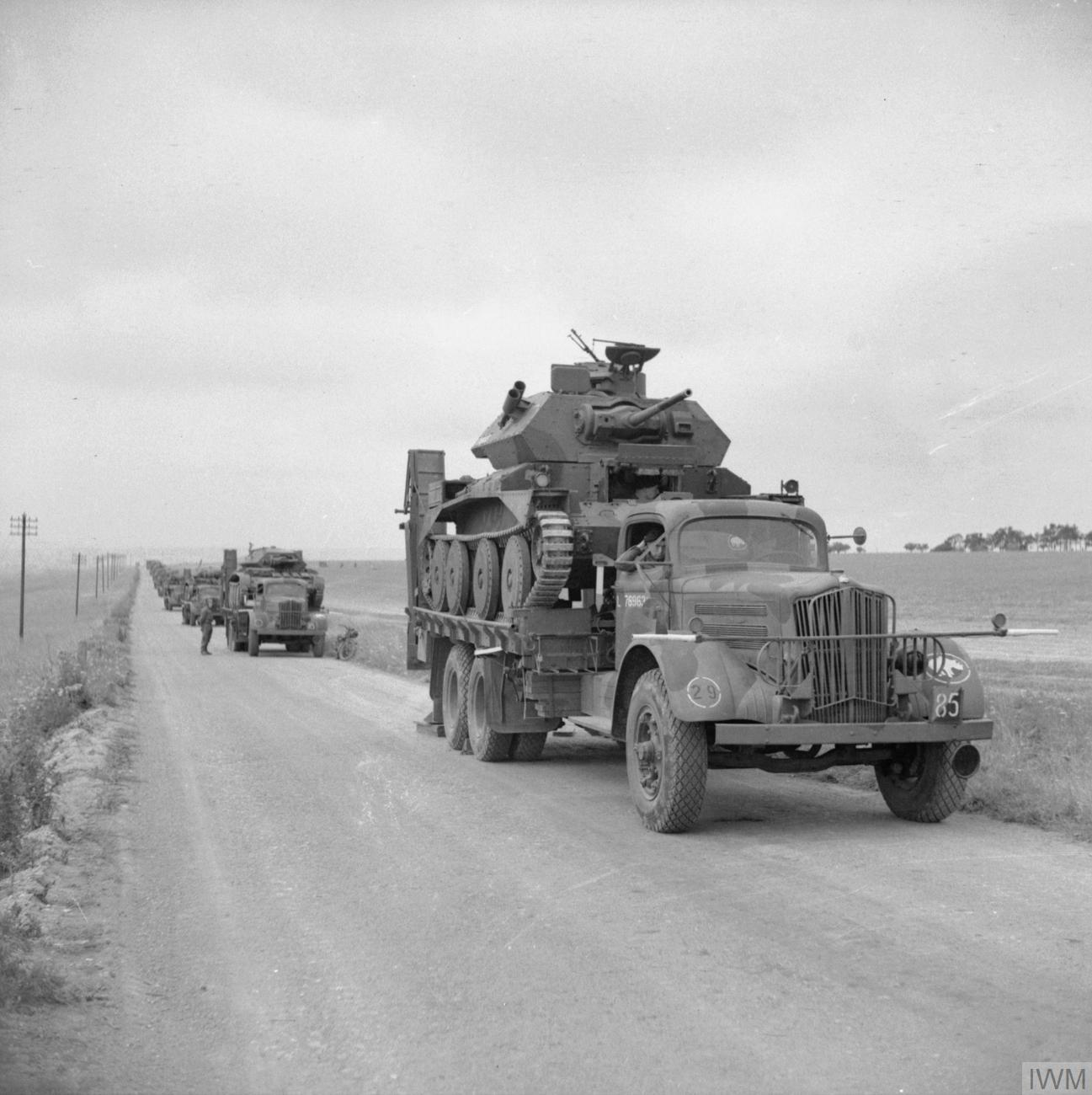
Divisional tank transporters, moving Cruiser Mk IVs, July 1941

Over the following days, the Dunkirk evacuation rescued the BEF. The 1st Armoured Division and the remaining British forces in France, assisted the French with holding a defensive line along the Somme; the French now appreciating the division could not force a bridge crossing due to the way it was organised and equipped. On 5 June, elements of the division assisted the 51st (Highland) Infantry Division near Oisemont and lost several tanks. The next day, the division repelled further German attacks and captured 44 prisoners. It then came under the command of the French Tenth Army and the remnants of the division started to concentrate, with the instruction to launch a counterattack into the southern flank of the renewed German advance. No significant attack occurred, and the division withdrew beyond the Seine on 8 June. In the final stages of the campaign, Britain attempted to reinforce France with a second BEF while the French considered a national redoubt in Brittany that would include the division. Shortly afterwards, the proposal was rejected, all British forces were ordered to withdraw from France and the 1st Armoured Division was directed to Cherbourg. The 2nd Armoured Brigade's tanks were put aboard trains but never arrived. The 3rd Armoured Brigade's remaining 26 tanks moved by road. Between 16 and 18 June, now under the command of Lieutenant-General James Marshall-Cornwall's Norman Force, the division was withdrawn from Brest, Cherbourg, and Saint-Nazaire in Operation Aerial, and returned to the UK with just 13 tanks.

=== Home service ===
The division was then placed in reserve in Surrey to undertake anti-invasion duties and was given priority for tank production, over the 2nd Armoured Division, so it could rebuild. By October, the tank-strength of the division had increased to 18 light and 133 cruiser tanks. The same month, the 3rd Armoured Brigade was replaced by the 22nd Armoured Brigade. In April 1941, tanks were withdrawn and transported to reinforce British forces in Egypt via the Tiger convoy. In June, with a stalemate in the Western Desert campaign that was being fought in Egypt and Italian Libya, General Sir Claude Auchinleck—commanding British and Commonwealth forces in North Africa and the Middle East—informed the War Office that he needed at least two and ideally three armoured divisions to undertake offensive action to lift the Siege of Tobruk. The division then lost more tanks, as they were withdrawn and shipped to Egypt. This was followed by the 22nd Armoured Brigade being detached and dispatched as well. The division, equipped with 60 M3 Stuart light and 124 Crusader tanks, left the UK in August aboard convoy WS 12.

=== Initial desert fighting ===
When the division arrived in Egypt in mid-November 1941, the latest British offensive Operation Crusader had already started. Major-General Herbert Lumsden now held command and his force was ordered to undertake desert training. By the end of the year, Operation Crusader had concluded with an Axis withdrawal to western Libya. The 1st Armoured Division moved into eastern Libya, took over the front line and was reinforced with the 200th Guards Brigade. Apart from small infantry forces, the division was the only force within 100 miles (160 km) of the front line. The 1st Armoured Division was further reinforced with additional infantry and artillery units, although these had never before trained with the formation. Divisional-level training was intended to continue but inadequate fuel stocks interrupted it. In early January 1942, the division was subjected to an aerial attack that wounded Lumsden, who was replaced by Major-General Frank Messervy. On 21 January 1942, Axis forces attacked the 150-tank strong division and forced it to conduct a fighting withdrawal. It, along with the rest of the Eighth Army, retreated until the army regrouped at Gazala in February. During this period, 42 tanks were lost in combat and a further 30 were damaged or abandoned. (Note: Playfair highlights the similarity between this situation and that which occurred to the 2nd Armoured Division in April 1941.)

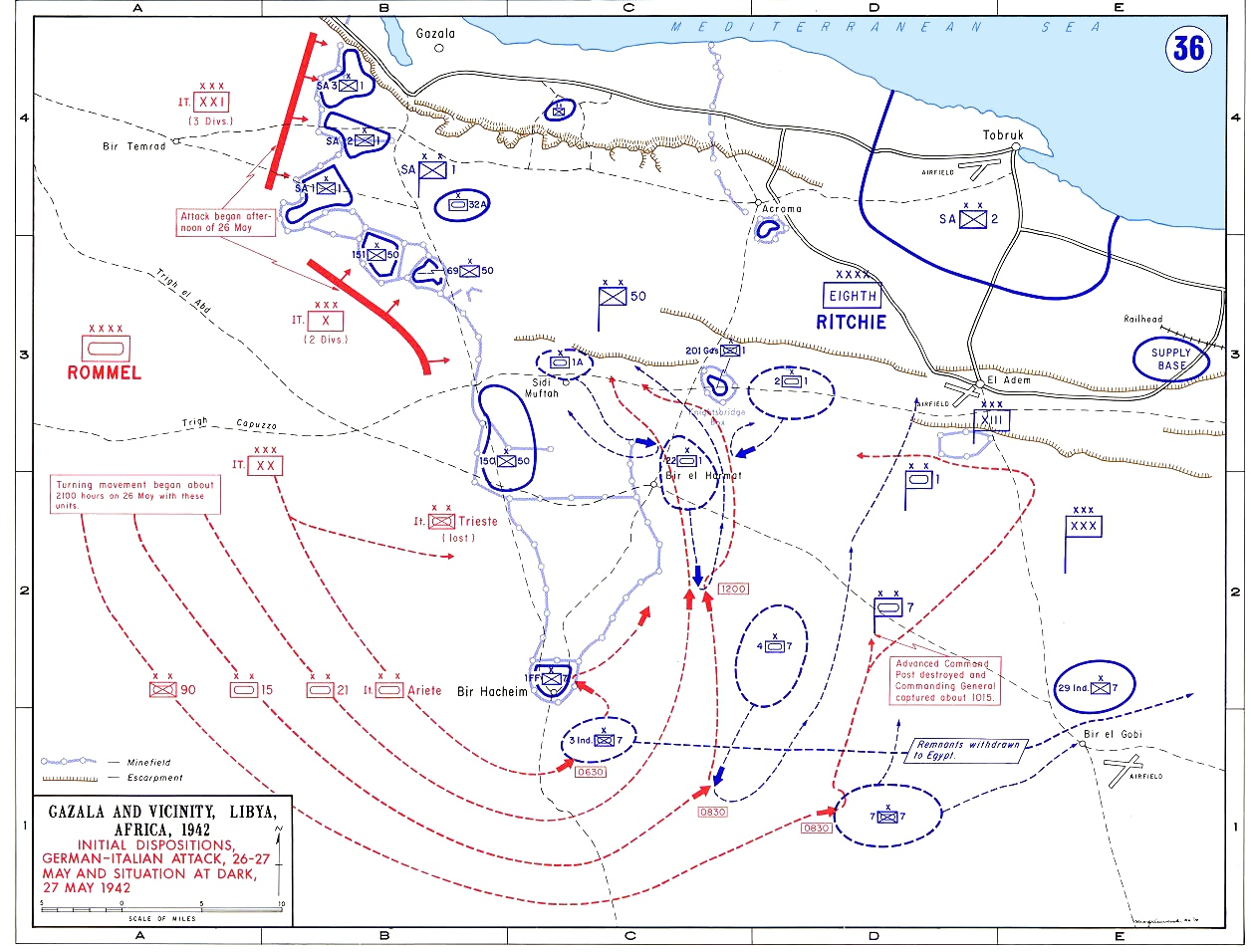
Allied (blue) and Axis (red) dispositions between 26 and 27 May. The 1st Armoured Division is located in the centre

Lumsden resumed command on 12 February 1942, and the 22nd Armoured Brigade rejoined in April. (Note: No divisional breakdown is provided but between the 1st and the 7th Armoured Divisions, there were 167 M3 Grant medium tanks, 257 Crusaders and 149 Stuart light tanks in the Gazala line.) According to Michael Carver (a participant of the battle, who would later become a field marshal and then a historian), Lumsden resented Messervy for the setback that had befallen the division in January. Messervy's 7th Armoured Division, with one armoured brigade, was considered to be as strong as the 1st due to both formations having an equal number of M3 Grant medium tanks. According to Carver, these two factors made Lumsden reluctant to support the 7th if called upon and was adamant none of his force would be allocated to it.

On 26 May 1942, Axis forces struck the Allied positions and initiated the Battle of Gazala. The next morning, the division was ordered to send the 22nd Armoured Brigade to join the 7th Armoured Division after it was realised a major Axis attack was underway. According to Carver, there was an "acrimonious exchange" between Lumsden and XIII Corps headquarters, the parent formation of the 1st Armoured Division, and no order was issued for two hours. The 22nd Armoured Brigade was attacked by Axis armoured forces; it lost 30 tanks and withdrew northwards. In the afternoon of 27 May, the division counterattacked with its full force. It was later supported by the 1st Army Tank Brigade and together checked the Axis advance. Over the following days, the division engaged the German 15th Panzer Division and the Italian 132nd Armored Division "Ariete" with mixed success. (Note: Between 5 and 6 June 1942, the 22nd Armoured Brigade was transferred to the 7th Armoured Division. In combat during these two days, at least 60 of its 156 tanks were lost.)

By 12 June, tank crew morale was low, and the relationship between Lumsden and Messervy further deteriorated. The brigadiers of the division's armoured brigades, which had temporarily been assigned to the 7th Armoured Division, requested to be returned to the 1st and this request further damaged Lumsden's relationship with Messervy. During the day, the tanks of the 7th Armoured Division were placed under the command of the 1st, and it was able to use 83 Grants, 59 Crusaders and 64 Stuarts. That day, the division battled the 15th and 21st Panzer Divisions. The Allies' initial success at halting a German tank attack was followed by an attack on the 4th Armoured Brigade, and by that evening, it had 15 of the 95 tanks with which it had started. The 1st Armoured Division had been reduced to 50 tanks. While tank losses had been heavy, most were able to be recovered and were sent to workshops to be repaired. On 13 June, the division's infantry—the 201st Guards Brigade (formerly the 200th Guards Brigade), holding an entrenched position called the Knightsbridge Box—came under a German assault. The armoured brigades fought additional actions in support of the infantry but during the hours of darkness it was decided to abandon the position, marking a turning point in the battle and the start of the Eighth Army's retreat from Gazala.

As the Eighth Army retreated into Egypt, it formed up at Mersa Matruh, which had originally been considered the location in which British forces would conduct "a last-ditch stand" because its loss would bring the Mediterranean Fleet based at Alexandria and the city of Cairo within range of Axis aerial attacks. By 1942, El Alamein, a 40-mile (64 km) stretch of desert between the sea and impassable salt marshes to the south offered a stronger defensive position; however, it lay a further 150 miles (240 km) to the east and Auchinleck had to factor-in the political, moral, and propaganda implications of abandoning Mersa Matruh without a fight. The 1st Armoured Division, reinforced with tanks from the 7th Armoured Division, was positioned in the desert to protect army's southern desert flank. On 27 June, the division fought the 15th Panzer and that evening, withdrew as part of a general withdrawal conducted by XIII Corps.

=== First El Alamein ===
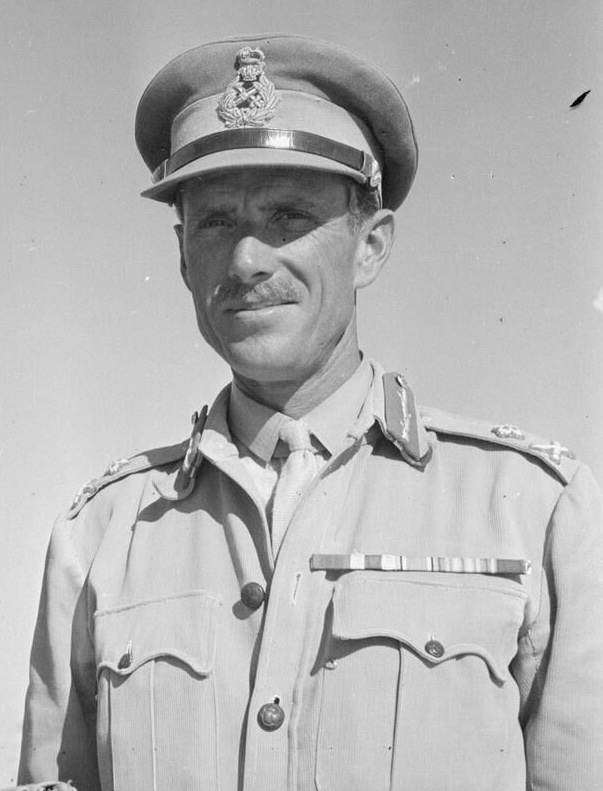
Herbert Lumsden, who commanded the division for the majority of the first half of 1942

The division regrouped at El Alamein with the rest of the army and was assigned a counterattack role. On 1 July, the first German attack began. One of the division's brigades became bogged down in soft sand while another was not made aware of the fighting for two hours due to poor communications. When the division finally entered the battle, it engaged the 15th Panzer Division and forced it to withdraw. The next day, fighting resumed with an engagement against the 21st Panzer Division. At dusk on 3 July, the division fended off a determined German attack. Both sides were now spent. On 5 July, Lumsden quarrelled with his superior Lieutenant-General Willoughby Norrie. Lumsden wanted his division, which now contained the majority of the army's armoured forces, to be relieved after weeks of continuous action.

A short period of inactivity, during which both sides entrenched themselves on the territory they held, followed. Ruweisat Ridge dominated the central part of the battlefield. The eastern end was under Allied control while Axis forces occupied the western end. Operation Bacon was intended to occupy the entirety of the ridge via a night attack by Major-General Leslie Inglis' 2nd New Zealand Division. The 1st Armoured Division was to provide support, but Inglis and Lumsden argued over the way the division would be used. Inglis wanted the tanks to move up and be able to defend the infantry at dawn and to fend off anticipated German counterattacks. Lumsden cited Auchinleck's instruction that the division was not to be fixed in an infantry-support role and was to be able to engage and destroy Axis armour as needed. On 13 July, a conference was held by XIII Corps, during which the two divisional commanders grudgingly reconciled and decided how the 1st Armoured Division would be used, although both left with different impressions of the subject. The New Zealanders still expected armoured support at first light, which would require the tanks to move forward during the night in preparation under the assumption of success. Written orders provided to the division called for it to provide flanking protection and exploit any success achieved by the infantry once codewords were received, which indicated the tanks would only move once success had been confirmed.

Map of the El Alamein battlefield

Two days later, the New Zealand infantry assaulted the ridge, but communication breakdowns meant they were unable to inform the 1st Armoured Division of their success and the tanks did not move. The lack of armoured support resulted in at least one New Zealand battalion being overrun during a German tank-based counterattack, causing a controversy that the division failed to carry out its orders to support the New Zealanders. At around 06:30, the first elements of the division began to move forward, and it took two hours to advance the few miles to the prior front line. Isolated pockets of entrenched Italians, whom the New Zealanders had bypassed during the night, were able to halt the advance. Despite efforts by the 5th Indian Infantry Brigade to clear these pockets to allow the 1st Armoured Division forward, minefields and flanking fire from additional Axis positions impeded progress, and the division was not in position to assist the New Zealanders when a large attack was unleashed upon them by German armour in the afternoon. Small groups of Italian and German tanks that moved towards the 1st Armoured Division were, however, repulsed. In conversations between Lumsden and New Zealand officers, Lumsden said he had verbally informed his brigadiers to move forward during the night, although no written evidence exists to support this. Lumsden had, by that point, become notorious for providing verbal instructions to his subordinates, denying them if a positive outcome was not achieved, and taking praise if successful. Historian Niall Barr wrote; "there was no understanding within 2nd New Zealand Division of the difficulties which tank crews faced in combat and seemingly no recognition within 1st Armoured Division of its responsibility to ensure that Eighth Army's infantry did not face an armoured counterattack alone".

Operation Splendour, which called for the New Zealanders to seize the El Mreir depression with support from the 1st Armoured Division, followed. Planning for this operation coincided with Lumsden being wounded during an air attack and his replacement by Major-General Alexander Gatehouse who, due to undertaking prior duties, was absent from the planning sessions and was not informed of the situation when he arrived, leading to differing expectations of the division's role. In the early morning of 22 July, the New Zealanders reported the capture of their objectives and requested the 1st Armoured Division to move forward. The armoured brigades were ordered to be prepared to deal with German counterattacks but were not ordered to advance. Four hours later, as a repeat of 15 July played out for the infantry, the 1st Armoured Division spotted and engaged German tanks. Minor efforts to advance were thwarted by Axis anti-tank gunfire from positions believed to have been bypassed during the night assault and the tanks withdrew. During the day, Inglis fought with Gatehouse over the lack of armour intervention; Gatehouse said he had not been asked to provide support.

On 22 July, Gatehouse was wounded. Brigadier Arthur Fisher took temporary command. Operation Manhood, the final action of the battle, started four days later, with the division supporting Australian, British, and South African infantry. The infantry night attack succeeded while the division conducted a night march to be in position at daybreak to repel German counterattacks. Reports, however, indicated minefields had not been cleared so at dawn on 27 July, the tanks were again not in a position to support the exposed infantry, and one Australian battalion and one British brigade suffered heavy losses. In the mid-morning, tanks started to pass through the gaps in the minefield but German anti-tank guns had been relocated and halted the division's efforts. Brigadier Frederick Kisch, the chief engineer of the Eighth Army, condemned the division for not doing more during this operation, stating gaps had been created but the division would not move until they were completely satisfied their tanks would not strike mines. According to Barr, this is set against a context of the division needing to conserve tanks and having run into mines in all previous actions. Barr wrote some of the gaps created during Manhood were completely clear, some were found to contain no live or dummy mines, and at least one had not been completely cleared. There was little coordination between the units clearing the minefields and with too few liaison officers, the division was not informed of the openings. Had they been aware, they could have been in position well in advance of the German attacks. The long-term outcome of this was for each formation to be given integrated engineer support for lifting mines, and the responsibility for lifting mines in the path of their advance without needing to rely on other units to do it for them.

=== Second El Alamein to Tunis ===
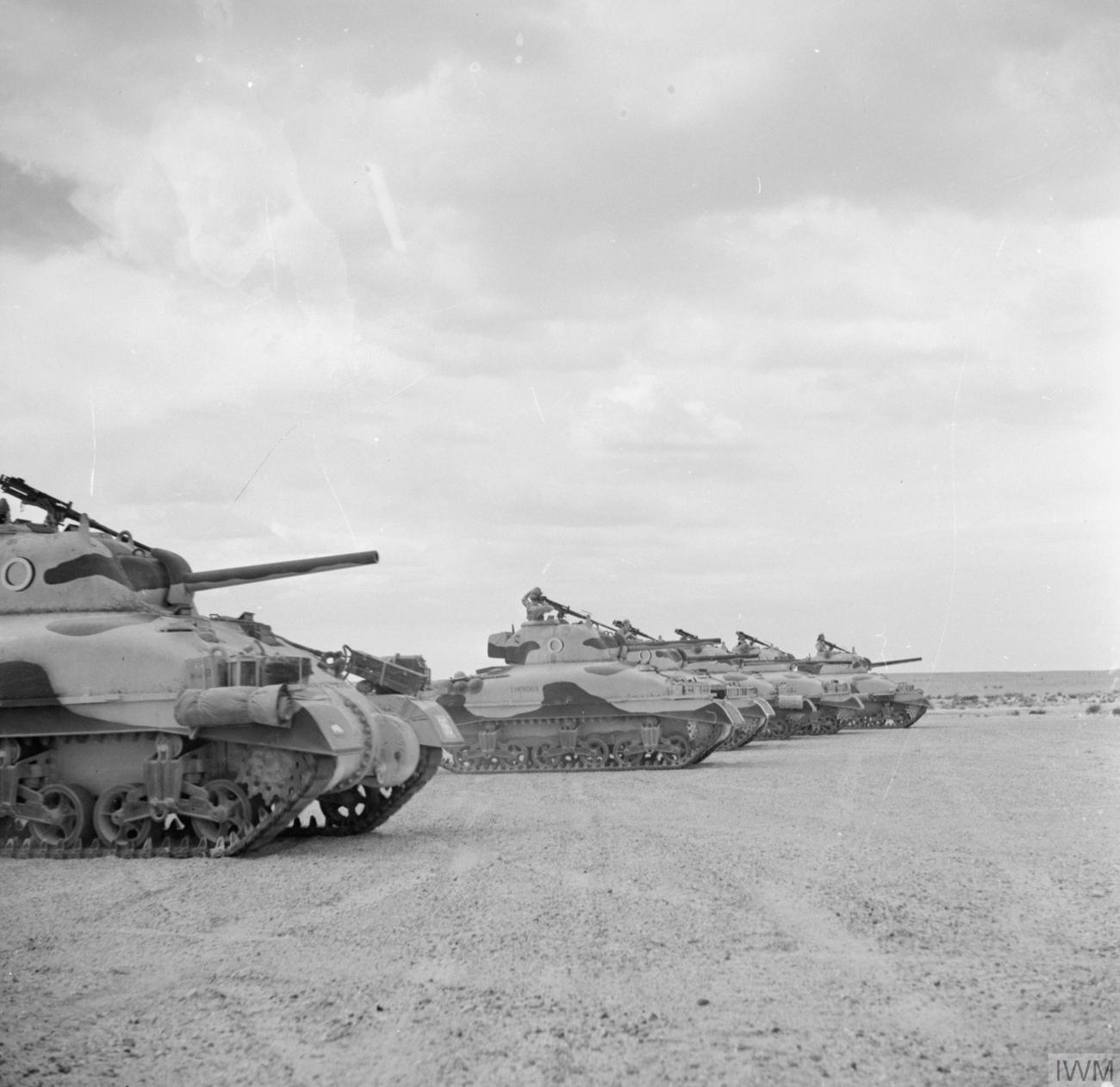
Sherman tanks of the 2nd Dragoon Guards (Queen's Bays), 1st Armoured Division, at El Alamein, 24 October 1942

With the fighting over, the division moved into reserve for rest, leave, integrating reinforcements, and to conduct training that was to last until October and would include night marches. During this period, Major-General Raymond Briggs assumed command and the division was reorganised to conform with War Office directions that were issued in May 1942. It then composed of the 2nd Armoured Brigade (with 1 Grant, 92 Shermans, and 68 Crusaders) and the 7th Motor Brigade of three infantry battalions.

On 23 October 1942, the Second Battle of El Alamein began with Operation Lightfoot and a night march by the division. However, unable to extract from the minefields they had to force, the division spent the following days engaging Axis armour from within the minefields. Three days after the start of the battle, the division's infantry launched a night assault to capture two Axis strongholds, although map-reading errors delayed progress. The subsequent defence of Outpost Snipe inflicted heavy losses on Axis forces that conducted a counterattack and resulted in Lieutenant-Colonel Victor Buller Turner being awarded the Victoria Cross.

On 2 November, Operation Supercharge, the next phase of the battle, commenced. The 9th Armoured Brigade, an independent formation, was tasked with charging an Axis anti-tank gun line near Tel el Aqqaqir, and to create enough damage to allow the 1st Armoured Division to follow and break through the Axis lines. Despite the loss of 70 out of 94 tanks and over 200 casualties, not enough damage was done to the Axis positions and the division was unable to advance. According to Barr, the division "would have met the same fate" as the 9th Armoured Brigade had they done so. The division battled with Axis armoured formations throughout the day, losing 54 tanks that were destroyed or damaged, and in return disabled or destroyed around 70. During the darkness of the following morning, the 7th Motor Brigade launched an unsuccessful attack to breach this same position; at least 26 tanks were lost during the day to further Axis tank engagements. In the final stages of the battle, the 90th Light Division was repeatedly engaged as they conducted a rearguard action to protect the Axis forces that had started their general retreat from El Alamein. Throughout the battle, map-reading errors caused repeated problems for the division and affected other formations fighting alongside them. With the battle over, the division took part in the westward pursuit of the retreating Axis forces.

The division's next action was in March 1943, when it joined the Battle of the Mareth Line after having entered Tunisia following the conclusion of the pursuit. This was followed by an attack towards Wadi Akarit on 29 March and its embroilment in the Battle of Wadi Akarit one week later. During April, the division was assigned to the First Army, which had advanced from Algeria into Tunisia. It was then redesignated as the 1st British Armoured Division to avoid confusion with the American 1st Armored Division. At this time, the Allied tanks were painted green to replace their prior desert camouflage colours. The division then took part in Operation Vulcan from April 23, and fought at El Kourzia. Their final action of the campaign took place on 8 May near Tunis. With the conclusion of fighting in Tunisia, the division remained in North Africa until 1944.

=== Italian campaign ===
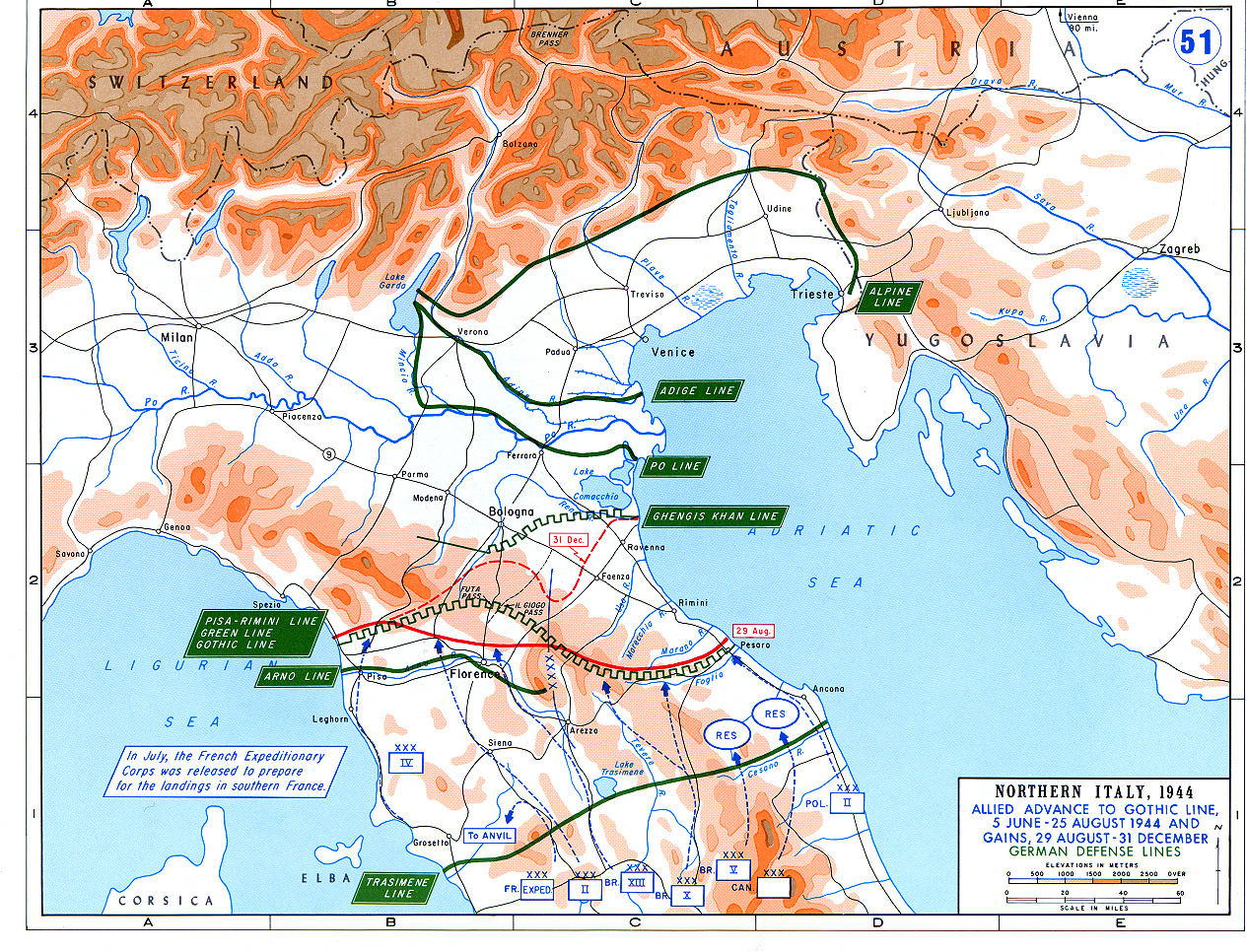
Italy and the various German defensive lines, with Gothic Line marked in red

In May 1944, the 1st Armoured Division started to move to Italy to join the Italian campaign; it did not complete its landings until mid-June. It was then held in reserve, being composed of the divisional headquarters, divisional troops, and the 2nd Armoured Brigade. In July, the division was provided with two infantry brigades to finalise a new organisation that reflected the need for additional infantry in Italy. Troops continued to be added to the division until 23 August. The late arrival of troops and the switching of units with other formulations hindered the division's ability to train as cohesive force. On 14 August, Major-General Richard Hull took command.

The 1st Armoured Division was tasked with exploiting any success achieved by their infantry colleagues, who were assaulting the German Gothic Line. At the end of August 1944, it moved forward to join the fighting, advancing behind the assaulting infantry, and lost 22 tanks due to mechanical breakdowns by the time it reached the Foglia river on 3 September. The 46th Infantry Division had led the 1st Armoured Division through German defences, and it was hoped the infantry division would likewise be able to seize crossings over the Marano river. However, the infantry had not been able to do so. Moving through the 46th's position, the 1st Armoured Division advanced towards Coriano. The two leading armoured regiments, each with a supporting infantry company, were met with heavy anti-tank gunfire from the 29th Panzergrenadier Division. For several hours, they attempted to progress before withdrawing at dusk, having lost about 40 tanks. The division's overall tank strength fell from 141 to 86. A more successful attack was made the following day when a village was captured and 60 prisoners were taken, but this advantage was unable to be exploited due to insufficient supporting infantry.

A renewed assault in the same vicinity took place on 12 September, when the division attacked the 26th Panzer and the 98th Infantry Divisions. The attack was a success; an important ridge was captured and 789 prisoners were taken. In conjunction with other formations, the division then cleared Coriano but immediate exploitation was made difficult due to German opposition and defences, and too few infantry were able to support the attack. Further advances were made on 15 and 16 September, when the division's infantry captured another village and two days later, a hill. The division's armoured brigade came under heavy attack on 20 September when operating near the village of Ceriano and trying to advance towards the Marecchia river. A small amount of terrain was gained but one regiment was reduced to 18 tanks. At the end of the day, the division's infantry moved to secure the ground captured and heavy rain ended the fighting. Between the end of August and 21 September, the division suffered 1,111 casualties. (Note: During the assault on the Gothic Line, the Eighth Army lost 130 Shermans and 20 Stuarts. No breakdown is provided to state if these were all from the 1st Armoured Division or not.) The division subsequently fought its way across the Marecchia between 22 and 23 September and then, in its final action, captured Santarcangelo di Romagna on 24 September.

Oliver Leese, the commanding officer of the Eighth Army, criticised the division's performance during the fighting, saying; "it is extraordinary how difficult it is to make new troops realise the inter-dependence of tanks and infantry until they have gained the knowledge by bitter experience in battle". William Jackson, the author of the British official history for this period, commented that the 6th Armoured Division would have been a better choice for the role the 1st undertook in Italy because it "was fully experienced in hill, if not mountain warfare and would have been a better choice than the ad hoc last minute grouping of three brigades which was all that 1st Armoured Division could really claim to be".

By mid-1944, the British Army was in the midst of a manpower crisis; it did not have enough men to replace the losses suffered by front line infantry units. In the Italian theatre, the army needed to find at least 21,000 reinforcements and had suffered an average of 300 casualties per day during the August-to-September fighting that compounded this issue. To address this crisis, the War Office started to transfer men from the Royal Artillery and the Royal Air Force to infantry training depots but this was not enough to stem the shortfall of available soldiers and the decision was made to disband divisions to move the men to combat formations. The 1st Armoured Division was chosen to be disbanded. The 43rd Gurkha Lorried Infantry Brigade, which had come under its command after moving to Italy, was transferred to the 56th (London) Infantry Division to replace the 168th (London) Infantry Brigade that had been withdrawn due to lack of reinforcements. Divisional troops and the 18th Infantry Brigade (previously the 7th Motor Brigade) were reassigned to other formations to reinforce them, while the 2nd Armoured Brigade was retained as an independent armoured force.

The divisional headquarters was also maintained. During October 1944, it commanded three small, ad hoc groups that had been created and was used to screen assembling Allied forces during further fighting on the Gothic Line. Around the same time, German intelligence determined the division had been all but disbanded. The headquarters relinquished command of its final troops on 28 October and the division ceased to be an operational formation. It was officially disbanded on 11 January 1945.

== Reformations ==
In July 1946, while located at Trieste, the 6th Armoured Division was redesignated as the 1st Armoured Division. The renamed formation maintained the 6th Armoured Division's insignia of a mailed fist. During 1947, the division transferred to Palestine where it was disbanded that September.

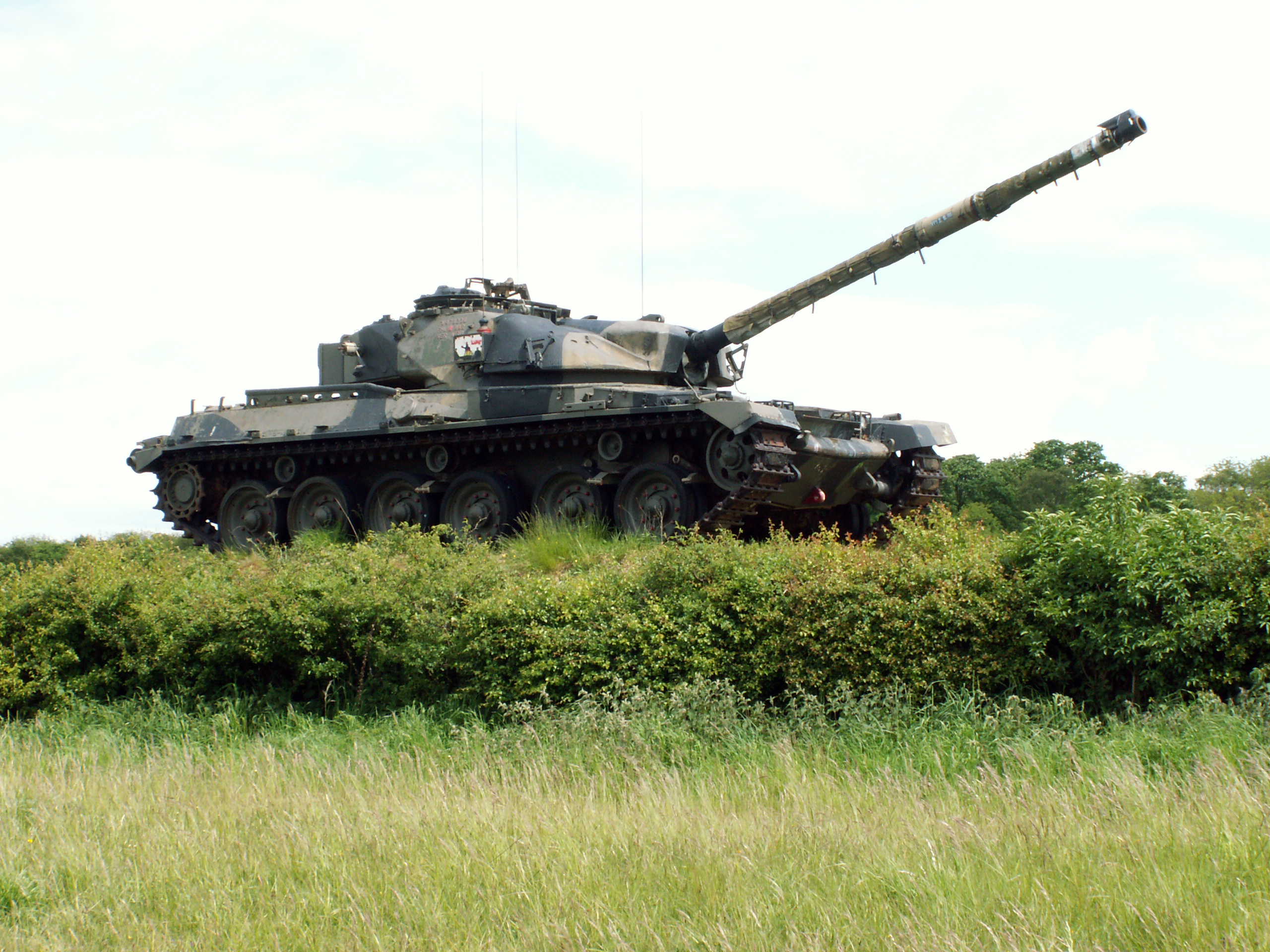
The Chieftain, the main battle tank of BAOR during this period.

During the 1970s, the UK had to reconcile its decreased resources with its commitments and the increased threat from the Soviet Union. The 1975 Mason Review, a government white paper, outlined a new defence policy and called for the British Army of the Rhine (BAOR) in Germany to be restructured and included the elimination of the brigade level of command. This political change allowed BAOR to restructure based on the anti-tank concepts the previous iteration of the 1st Division in its infantry form had pioneered. As a result, BAOR increased to four divisions for the first time since the end of the 1950s, with each division composed of two armoured regiments, three mechanised infantry battalions, and two artillery regiments.

On 1 April 1978, the 1st Division was redesignated as the 1st Armoured Division. The division's 7th and the 11th Armoured Brigades were disbanded and replaced by Task Forces Alpha and Bravo. It was intended the division could form up to five battlegroups, each of which would be commanded by either an armoured regiment or an infantry battalion commander. These groups were to be formed for a specific task and allocated the required forces. The divisional commander (general officer commanding (GOC)) was initially planned to oversee all the battlegroups but early training showed this to be impractical. To compensate, the divisional headquarters was increased to 750 men (wartime strength) and included two brigadiers. They would each command a flexible task force, which the GOC had formed. This approach intended to allow the GOC to tailor his forces to meet unforeseen events and execute the new developed doctrine. Task forces were not simply retitled brigades, and they had no administrative responsibilities. Structuring the division in this manner allowed for an overall reduction of 700 men. David John Anthony Stone, a historian who wrote about the British Army during the Cold War, said the system was "designed to allow the commander maximum flexibility and [to] take precise account of the operational or tactical task to be achieved".

In 1981, John Nott, the Secretary of State for Defence in the government elected in 1979, announced the 1981 Defence White Paper which, like the Mason Review, aimed to balance spending on the British military with the nation's financial resources. Nott's paper called for BAOR to be restructured from four armoured divisions of two brigades into a force of three divisions of three brigades. The intent was to save personnel and money while losing only one divisional headquarters. The task force concept, which had not met expectations, was dropped and the 1st Armoured Division was reorganised in line with Nott's recommendations. It then commanded the 7th, 12th, and 22nd Armoured Brigades. Each brigade contained either two armoured regiments and one mechanised infantry battalion, or two mechanised infantry battalions and one armoured regiment.

On 11 November 1983, the divisional insignia was changed. Major-General Brian Kenny decided to merge the then-current insignia with that used by the Second World War-era division. The new insignia combined the extant triangle and red outline with a charging rhino motif. Starting that year, the first Challenger tanks were provided to BAOR to replace the Chieftain, and all armoured regiments had converted by the end of the decade.

=== Gulf War ===
==== Preparation ====
On 2 August 1990, Iraq invaded the neighbouring country Kuwait. At this point Iraq posed a clear threat to Saudi Arabia, which controlled the then-largest-proven oil reserves. The invasion sparked international outrage and resulted in the formation of a US-led coalition, which dispatched troops to protect Saudi Arabia. The invasion coincided with the collapse of the Warsaw Pact, the subsequent decreased threat from the Soviet Union, and the ending of the Cold War, which facilitated troop withdrawals from Europe for deployment to the Middle East.

Ground operations, showing the 1st Armoured Divisions movements

The British role in the conflict was assigned the codename Operation Granby. RAF units were the first dispatched. On 14 September, the UK Government announced the British Army contingent would be based around the 1st Armoured Division's 7th Armoured Brigade. This was intended as a six-month deployment and the brigade replaced with another at the end. The brigade group was 9,500 strong and included 117 Challenger tanks, 101 Warrior infantry fighting vehicles, and 28 artillery pieces. The logistical requirement to maintain this force was deemed to be all existing stocks within the BAOR and over half of the spare parts the BAOR had. This forced the cannibalization of some of the BAOR's tanks to obtain the required spares and equipment for the brigade. On 22 November, the decision was made to expand the British contingent to a division-sized force. The 4th Armoured Brigade was committed to join the 7th Armoured Brigade in the Middle East—codenamed Granby 1.5), and the entire force was to be overseen by the 1st Armoured Division. With these two brigades and the attached supporting units, the division was 28,000 strong and had 7,000 vehicles. These included 179 Challenger tanks, 316 Warriors, 79 artillery pieces, 16 M270 Multiple Launch Rocket Systems, in addition to armoured reconnaissance vehicles, anti-tank helicopters, and anti-aircraft weapon systems. This expansion prompted another major effort to obtain the required parts and spares to maintain the force. The majority of the division's personnel were flown to Saudi Arabia following a layover at Cyprus. A small number joined the vehicles, which were loaded aboard charted merchant ships and took a roughly two-week journey from Germany to the Middle East. The vehicles were repainted, and once in Saudi Arabia they were modified for desert conditions and up-armoured.

Around 1,000 female personnel served with the division during the Gulf War, marking the first time women had been deployed within a British combat division in time of war. Around 80 per cent formed part of the medical staff, with the remainder serving in the supporting units such as signals, ordnance, and intelligence.

The arriving troops were quartered at Jubail and were assigned to the US I Marine Expeditionary Force. As the force expanded, Lieutenant-General Peter de la Billière, the overall British commander, called for the division to be used in the coming campaign's primary effort and not assigned to what was seen as a secondary role. As a result, the 1st Armoured Division joined the US VII Corps in December. On 18 January 1991, the division moved into the desert and underwent training, which included exercises with American forces. In mid-February, alongside VII Corps, the division conducted daily artillery attacks on Iraqi positions across the border.

==== Campaign ====
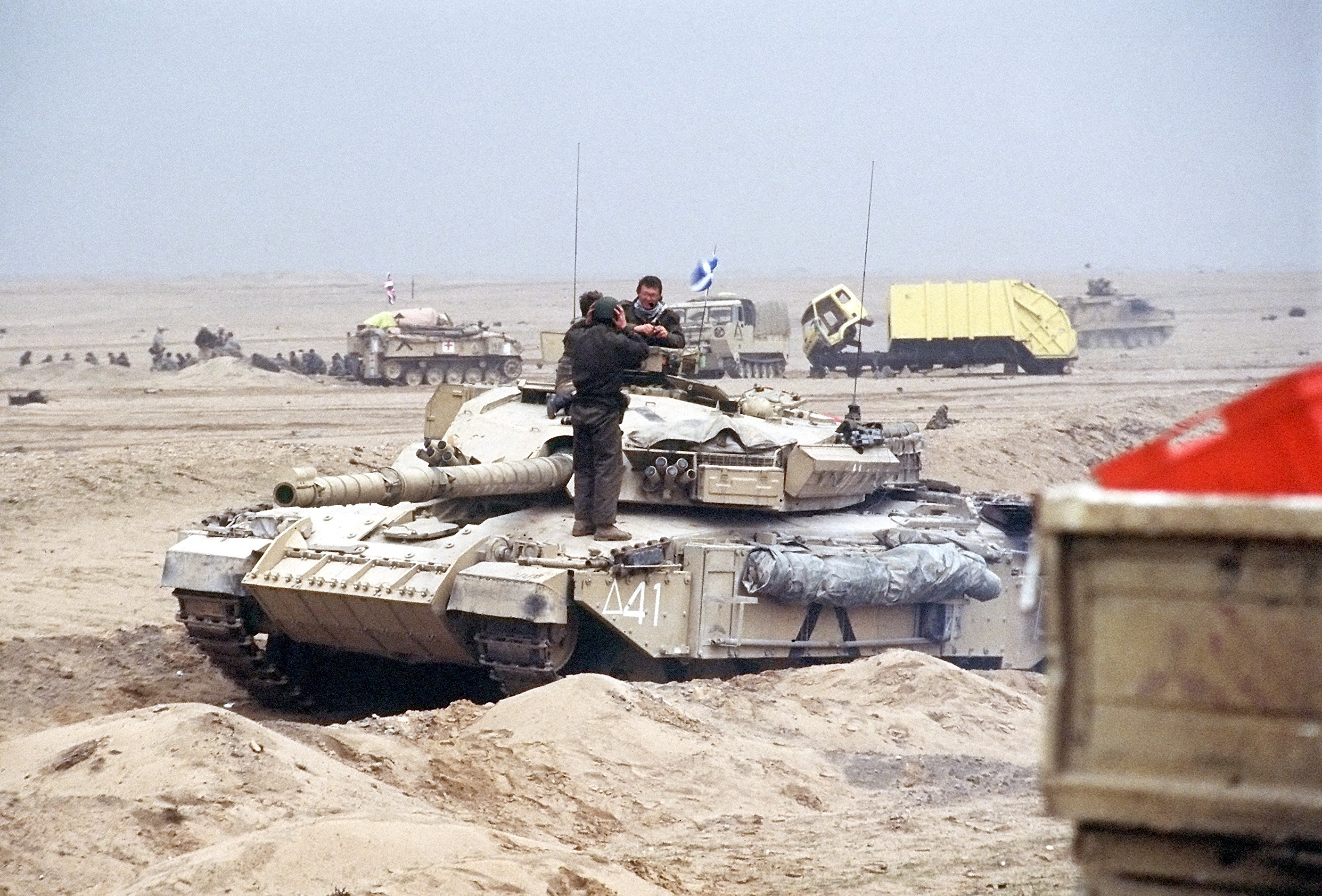
Elements of the division, north of Kuwait City on 28 January.

On 24 February 1991, VII Corps began the ground campaign and US forces breached Iraqi border positions, allowing the 1st Armoured Division to advance, and it entered Iraq the following day. The final elements of the division crossed into Iraqi territory in the early hours of 26 February. The division's objective was to prevent the redeployment of Iraqi mobile forces, to destroy encountered armour and artillery positions, and to seek out and destroy the local tactical reserve that consisted of the Iraqi 52nd Armored Division. Identified and named objectives were based around known Iraqi troop deployments. The capture of territory was not necessarily important so these objectives did not need to be secured as long as Iraqi forces left behind in them had been rendered immobile.

The 7th Armoured Brigade conducted the division's first attack at mid-afternoon on 25 February. Four hours later, the 4th Armoured Brigade entered the fray. Sandstorms and rain limited visibility and caused vehicles to engage at closer ranges than expected. The widespread use of thermal and night-vision equipment gave British troops a tactical advantage over Iraqi forces. By dawn on 26 February, the two brigades had overrun the immobile Iraqi 48th Infantry Division and captured its commanding officer, attacked elements of the 31st Infantry Division, and destroyed most of the 52nd Armored Division that had attempted to reinforce the assaulted formations or counterattack the British moves during three engagements. During 26 February, the division advanced towards Wadi al Batin, further isolating the Iraqi VII Corps frontline troops. Several VII Corps reserve positions were assaulted, resulting in the destruction of the remains of the 80th Armored Brigade, of the Iraqi 12th Armored Division, the 25th Infantry Division, the headquarters and logistical base of the 52nd Armoured Division that had previously avoided combat, and several artillery battalions. During the day, US A-10 Thunderbolts destroyed two Warriors in a friendly fire incident. With little organised resistance left between the British troops and the Persian Gulf, the division advanced unopposed for the next two days until it reached the Kuwait City–Basra highway (Highway 80) north of Kuwait City, where it linked up with US and Egyptian forces.

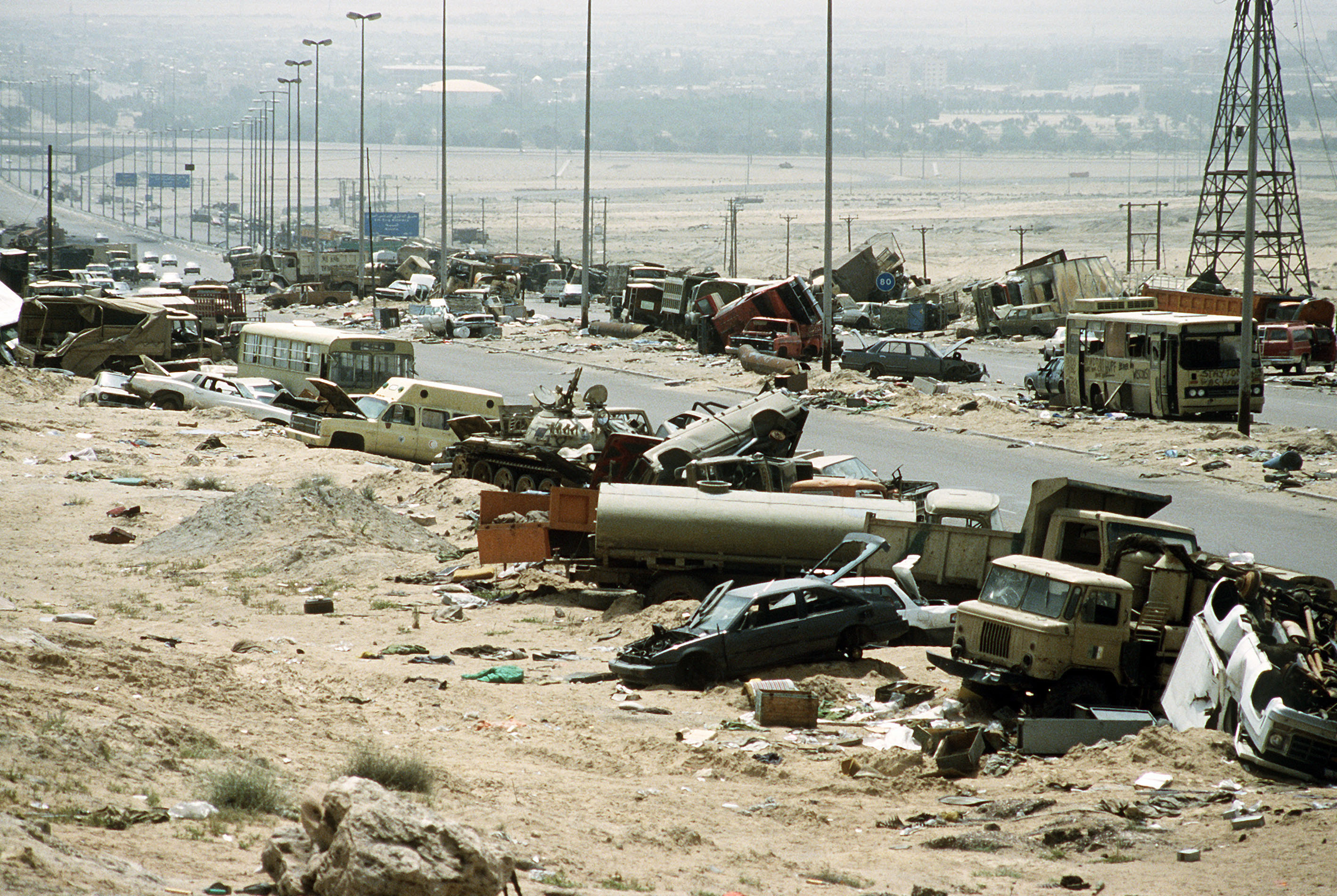
The Highway of Death, 18 April

During the campaign, Highway 80 became known as the Highway of Death as coalition aircraft destroyed large numbers of Iraqi vehicles fleeing Kuwait City. The 1st Armoured Division was tasked with clearing the highway; moving vehicles off the road, removing unexploded munitions, rounding up scattered Iraqi troops, searching for wounded personnel and providing them with medical treatment, and burying the dead. By 16 March, the 7th Armoured Brigade had been withdrawn to Al Jubayl and started to return to Germany. Divisional headquarters followed on 23 March, and by early April, only a battalion-sized British formation remained in the theatre.

According to Stephen Alan Bourque, who wrote the history of the US VII Corps during the Gulf War, "in only forty-eight hours ... [the division had] eliminated the greater part of five divisions of the Iraqi VII Corps" and took over 7,000 prisoners. In total, the division inflicted over 4,000 materiel—tanks, APCs, artillery, and other vehicles—losses upon the Iraqi army, which included the destruction of roughly 300 Iraqi main battle tanks. One of these tanks was destroyed from over three miles (4.8 km) away, which was the longest-confirmed kill during the conflict. The division largely faced Iraqi forces equipped with the T-55, which was significantly outmatched by the Challenger tank. Overall British casualties—including those from the Royal Navy, the Royal Air Force, and army forces not assigned to the division—were 47. Bourque said the one-sided nature of the fight was due to the ineptness of the Iraqi forces, who undertook "minimal local security", had "firing positions oriented in the wrong direction, poorly planned artillery fire, and miserable tank gunnery". He did, however, laud the bravery of the Iraqi tank companies. Patrick Cordingley, who led the 7th Armoured Brigade during the fighting, said the war "was not the clean, high-technology conflict portrayed by the news media. It was dirty, confusing, and bloody. Only training and discipline limited the amount of friendly engagements and presented the illusion of simplicity."

=== End of the Cold War ===
Following the defeat of Iraqi and the liberation of Kuwait, the division returned to Germany. Concurrent with the Gulf War was the collapse of the Soviet Union and the end of the Cold War. In July 1990, the British government announced a framework called Options for Change, which sought to restructure the British military based on the new strategic situation and allow for further cost-saving measures to be enacted. The size of the military was to be decreased by 18 per cent, equivalent to 56,000 personnel, by the mid-1990s and the BAOR was to be halved. This resulted in the division being disbanded on 31 December 1992 and its headquarters became HQ Lower Saxony District.

Further BAOR restructuring followed and in July 1993, the 4th Armoured Division was redesignated as the 1st (UK) Armoured Division. The reformed division then controlled the 4th, 7th, and 20th Armoured Brigades, each with two mechanised infantry battalions and two Challenger-tank-equipped armoured regiments. The reformed formation maintained the 4th Division's HQ presence at Herford and the rest of the division was spread across sites of the Westfalen Garrison area. Starting in the 1990s, elements of the division were regularly hosted in Poland to conduct training exercises. Between 1992 and 1994, the 1st (British) Corps and the BAOR were disbanded and replaced with the Allied Rapid Reaction Corps, a newly formed NATO HQ that was administered by the UK. The division came under its command and was deployed on several peacekeeping operations.

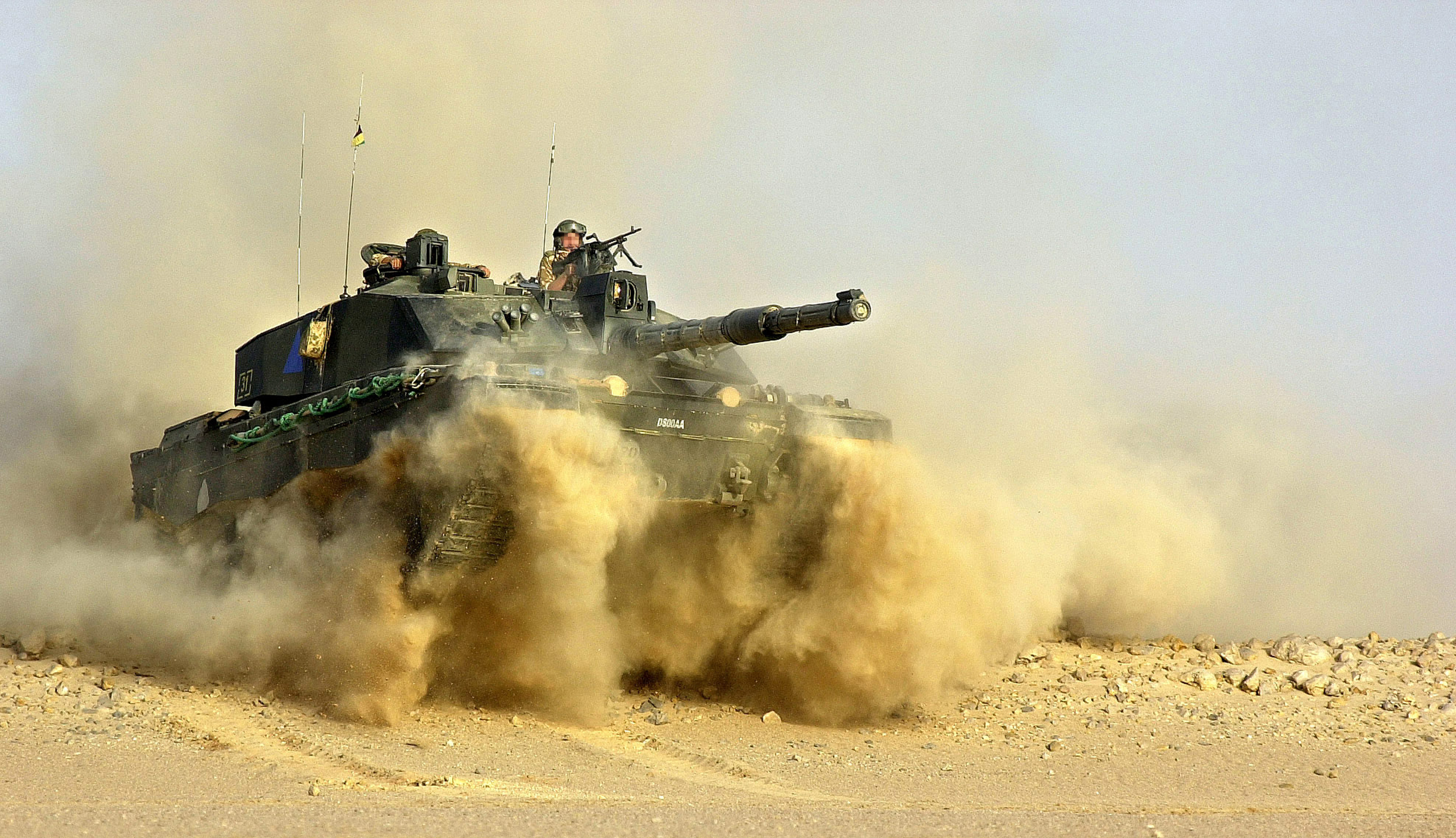
A Challenger 2 during Exercise Saif Sareea II

In 1995, the Multi-National Division (South-West) was formed by the British Army, to support peacekeeping operations in Bosnia. Forces were drawn from the 1st (UK) Armoured Division and the 3rd (UK) Division, with each headquarters controlling the division as their forces rotated through the command. This lasted until 1999, when force contributions changed and different commanders were selected from outside either division. Other peacekeeping operations included providing troops to Kosovo Force and the United Nations Peacekeeping Force in Cyprus. Detachments were also deployed to the Falkland Islands and Northern Ireland. In 1998, the division received the first Challenger 2 tanks, which replaced the earlier model, and they were initial used in Kosovo.

During 2001, Exercise Saif Sareea II was conducted in Oman. This included the division's 4th Armoured Brigade with 66 Challenger 2s. The UK government provided no funding to the division to undertake the required desert modifications, such as sand filters, for the tanks, resulting in widespread breakdowns during the exercise.

=== Invasion of Iraq ===
Following the end of the Gulf War, tensions between Iraq, the US and the UK remained. During the 1990s and early 2000s, a series of attacks occurred as part of the Iraqi no-fly zones conflict. Following the beginning of the War on terror in 2001, the political situation further escalated, culminating in a decision by the US to invade Iraq. In January 2003, because the UK was aligned with the US, the division was assigned as the primary British component of the invasion. The division needed additional infantry so it was reconfigured to consist of the 3rd Commando Brigade (Royal Marines), the 7th Armoured Brigade reinforced with infantry from the 20th Armoured Brigade, the 16th Air Assault Brigade made up of battalions of the Parachute Regiment, and the 102nd Logistical Brigade. By February, the division had assembled in Kuwait, and conducted training and rehearsals through to March. The formation, which was roughly 20,000 strong and had 120 Challenger II tanks, comprised around one third of the US-led invasion force. The division was tasked with securing oil-and-gas infrastructure in southern Iraq, the capture of Basra, and ultimately the securing of the provinces Al-Qādisiyyah, Basra, and Dhi Qar. This area was about half the size of England and Basra province was home to over two million people.

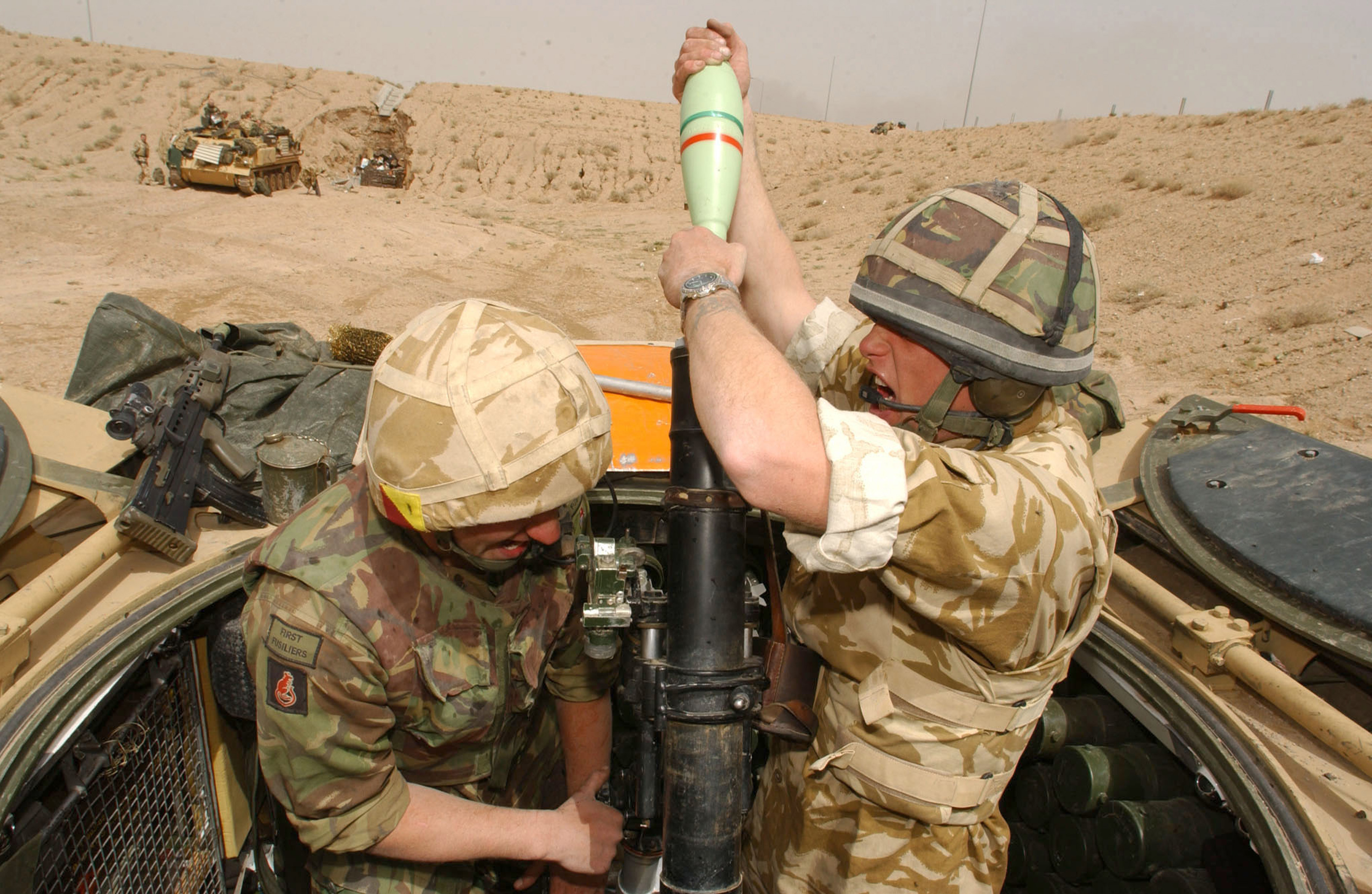
Soldiers of the division prepare to fire a mortar, 26 March 2003

The invasion began on 20 March. Elements of 3rd Commando Brigade, supplemented by the Special Air Service (SAS), the Special Boat Service (SBS), and US Navy Seals immediately secured coastal oil-and-gas facilities and infrastructure, preventing their destruction and environmental damage in the Gulf. For the Royal Marines and SBS, a week-long battle to secure the Al-Faw peninsula followed. The rest of the brigade, supported by US Marines, rapidly secured the Rumaila oil field and only seven of the over-1,000 well heads were destroyed by defending Iraqi forces. US Marines also captured Umm Qasr Port then moved north, leaving the 3rd Commando Brigade to finalise securing the city. With the port secure, the first humanitarian aid arrived on 31 March and was distributed in Umm Qasr. Aid was dispatched to other areas as they came under British control.

The 7th Armoured Brigade and 16th Air Assault Brigade captured additional oil facilities and prevented their destruction before moving towards Basra. The lead elements reached the outskirts within 24 hours and part of the 16th Air Assault Brigade established a roadblock on the main highway from Basra to Baghdad. Zubayr was secured and a loose cordon was established around Basra starting 23 March that aimed to allow Iraqi civilians to leave and to encourage Iraqi troops to desert and flee, and potentially allowed some to fight in the subsequent insurgency. On 26 March, the Iraqi garrison attempted to provoke a British attack by launching a tank assault. In the following one-sided engagement, 15 T-55s were destroyed. British infiltration and raids into the city followed before 6 April, when a large-scale probe was conducted in the northern section of the city. The probe's success prompted the deployment of rest of the available division—about 7,000 infantry, 80 tanks, and 100 Warriors—and Basra was secured by nightfall. The only tank loss suffered by the division occurred on 25 March during a friendly fire incident. Three days later, the division suffered additional friendly-fire casualties when they were attacked by the US 190th Fighter Squadron.

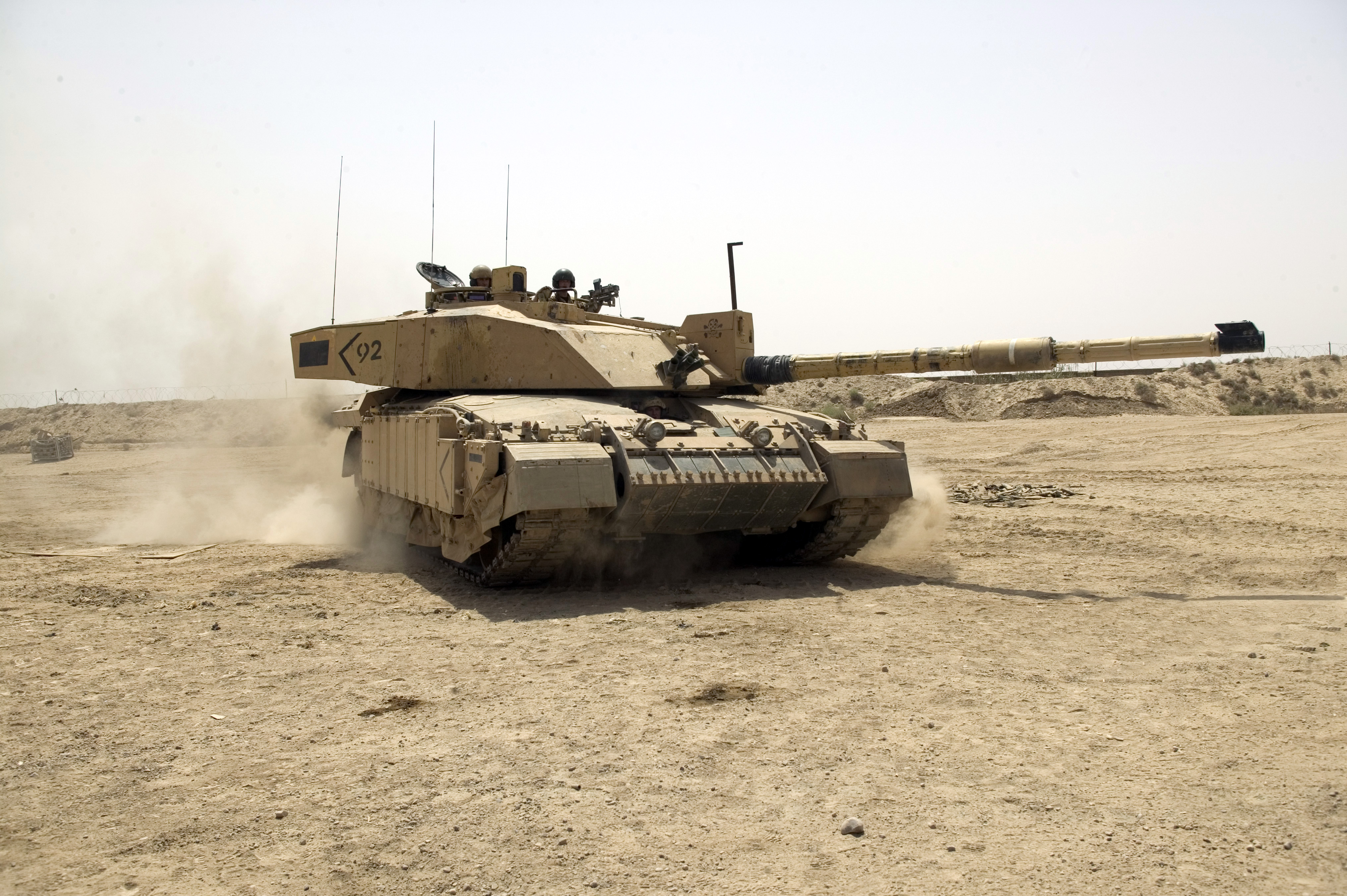
An example of the Challenger II in Iraq

With the initial stage of the conflict over, the division took on security-and-stabilisation responsibilities in their assigned area, which was expanded in April to include Maysan, relieving US Marines. On 23 June, the Battle of Majar al-Kabir occurred when divisional patrols consisting of soldiers of the 1st Battalion, Parachute Regiment and the Royal Military Police were ambushed, leaving six dead. By May, the majority of the 3rd Commando and 16th Air Assault Brigades had been withdrawn from Iraq. This was followed by the replacement of the 102nd Logistics Brigade with the 101st Logistic Brigade. During June, the 7th Armoured Brigade was replaced with the 19th Mechanised Brigade. On 11 July, the 3rd (UK) Division relieved the divisional headquarters. This was followed by the formation of the Multi-National Division (South-East), which took command of all Multi-National Forces in southern Iraq. The British portion of this force was based around a reinforced brigade, which came from different parent formations and was rotated through several deployments. From November 2003 to April 2004, the 1st (UK) Armoured Division's 20th Armoured Brigade was deployed to Iraq under the oversight of the Multi-National Division; the 4th Armoured Brigade was deployed between November 2004–April 2005; the 7th Armoured Brigade was dispatched between October 2005 and May 2006; the 20th Armoured Brigade was again deployed between May and November 2006; the 4th Mechanized Brigade—the renamed and rerolled 4th Armoured Brigade—went to Iraq between December 2007 and June 2008; the 7th Armoured Brigade was deployed between June and December 2008; and the division's final deployment, which the Multi-National Division oversaw, was undertaken by the 20th Armoured Brigade between December 2008 and 30 April 2009. This final deployment marked the official end of British combat operations in Iraq, all of which had fallen under Operation Telic.

=== Afghanistan ===
From 2006 onwards, Task Force Helmand, which was based on a reinforced brigade, was formed to conduct stabilisation-and counterinsurgency missions in Helmand Province, Afghanistan. Under the oversight of this task force, the division deployed the 20th Armoured Brigade between October 2011 and April 2012. The next deployment came between October 2013 and June 2014, when the 7th Armoured Brigade was sent to Afghanistan. The final deployment, which coincided with the disbanding of the task force and the British withdrawal from Helmand, was made by the 20th Armoured Brigade between June and December 2014.

In 2014 the division was disbanded. Its personnel and assets were reorganized as the 1st (United Kingdom) Division, predominantly of light infantry.

== See also ==
- List of commanders of the British 1st Armoured Division
- List of orders of battle for the British 1st Armoured Division
- British armoured formations of the Second World War

== Notes ==
Footnotes

Citations
