= 2nd Armoured Brigade (United Kingdom) =

Armored Brigade of the British Army during World War 2

2nd Light Armoured Brigade 2nd Armoured Brigade
- Active: 1939–1945
- Country: United Kingdom
- Branch: British Army
- Type: Armoured
- Size: Brigade
- Engagements: Battle of France; Second Battle of El Alamein; Battle of Gazala

Commanders
- Notable commanders: Richard Goodbody

The 2nd Armoured Brigade was an armoured brigade of the British Army, part of the pre-war Regular Army, during the Second World War, prior to 14 April 1940 titled 2nd Light Armoured Brigade.

== History ==
The 2nd Armoured Brigade was part of the 1st Armoured Division when it was sent as part of the British Expeditionary Force (BEF) to France in 1940. It was evacuated from Brest without its heavy equipment.

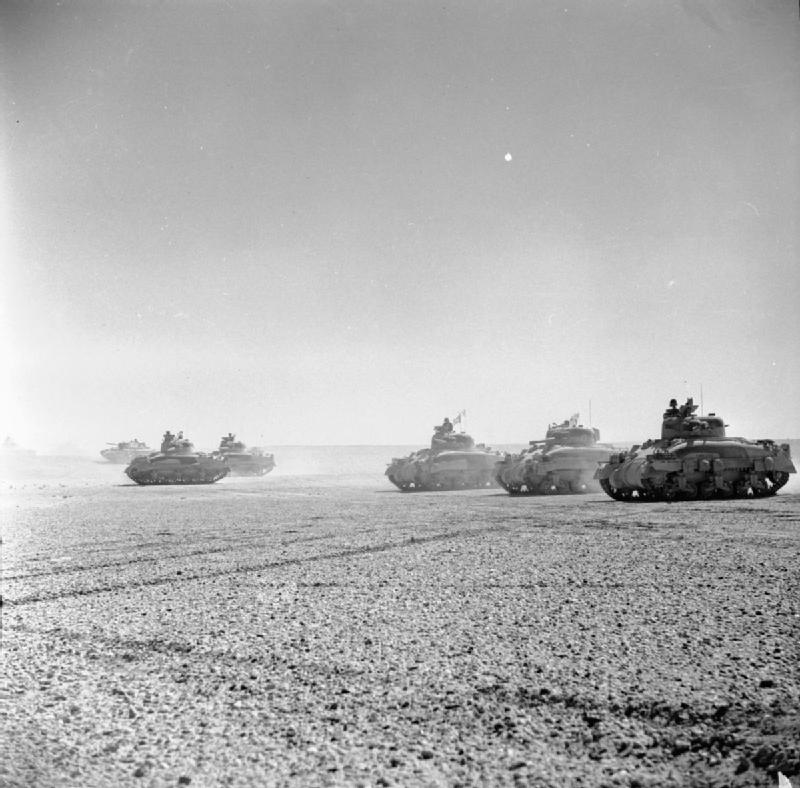
Sherman tanks of 'C' Squadron, 9th Queen's Royal Lancers, 5 November 1942.

After being reformed it was sent in November 1941 to North Africa, where it served with the 1st and the 7th Armoured Divisions. It fought at Gazala, El Alamein, the Tunisia Campaign and the Italian Campaign.

After 26 September 1944 it appears to have been used as an independent brigade supporting 46th (North Midland) Division; Eighth Army; 1st Canadian Division (January-March 1945); 78th Infantry Division (March-May 1945); Eighth Army again, and XIII Corps (United Kingdom).

=== Commanders ===
- Brigadier F. Thornton
- Brigadier Richard McCreery
- Brigadier Raymond Briggs
- Brigadier A.F. Fisher
- Brigadier R. Peake
- Brigadier Richard Goodbody
- Brigadier John Frederick Boyce Combe

== Component Units during the Second World War ==
- The Queen's Bays (2nd Dragoon Guards)
- 9th Queen's Royal Lancers
- 10th Royal Hussars (Prince of Wales's Own)
- 1st Bn. The Rifle Brigade
- 9th Bn. The King's Own Yorkshire Light Infantry

== See also ==
- British Armoured formations of World War II
- List of British brigades of the Second World War
