= Robert Peake (British Army officer) =

Brigadier Robert Peake
- Born: 1903
- Military career
- Allegiance: United Kingdom
- Branch: British Army
- Rank: Brigadier
- Unit: Royal Engineers
- Conflicts: Second World War

Brigadier Robert William Peake (born 1903) was a British Army officer who briefly served as acting General Officer Commanding 1st Armoured Division during the Second World War.

== Military career ==
Peake was commissioned into the Royal Engineers and was promoted to lieutenant on 12 February 1920. During the Second World War, he served as a staff officer with the 1st Armoured Division in North Africa and was briefly acting General Officer Commanding 1st Armoured Division in from 15 July 1943 until 17 July 1943. He then became commander of 2nd Armoured Brigade in North Africa in December 1943 until he was relieved in February 1944.
