= A80 =

A80 or A-80 may refer to:

- A80 road (Scotland), a major road in Scotland
- Autovía A-80, a road connecting Ribadesella and Cangas de Onis, Spain
- HLA-A80, an HLA-A serotype
- Atlanta TRACON (designated A80), an FAA terminal radar approach control (TRACON) facility for the Atlanta area
- Dutch Defence, in the Encyclopaedia of Chess Openings
- A fourth generation Toyota Supra (ID code: A80)
- AAT (disambiguation)
- Samsung Galaxy A80, phone manufactured by Samsung Electronics
