= Secondary School Entrance Examination =

Defunct examination for primary six students in Hong Kong held by the Education Bureau

Previous examination dates
Year	Date	Year	Date
1962	11 May	1970	6 May
1963	3 May	1971	5 May
1964	6 May	1972	3 May
1965	5 May	1973	3 May
1966	4 May	1974	3 May
1967	3 May	1975	30 April
1968	3 May	1976	4 May
1969	7 May	1977	3 May

The Secondary School Entrance Examination (Chinese: 香港中學入學考試) was an examination for primary six students in Hong Kong held by the Education Bureau. Its goal was to select students to enter secondary schools. It was established in 1962 to replace the Joint Primary 6 Examination. It was last held in 1977 and subsequently replaced by Secondary School Places Allocation in 1978.

== Overview ==
The examination included Chinese, English, and arithmetic. English students could choose to replace Chinese and English with English I and English II. The examination started on the first week of May. Each subject had one paper. The allowed time was 45 minutes. In 1962, the examination started at 13:30. There were two 30-minute recesses in between examinations. From 1963, the examination started at 13:15. The recesses were extended to last 40 minutes. From 1970, the examination started at 13:00. The recesses were extended to last 50 minutes.

Timetable
1962		Time		Subject
Time	Subject	1963	1970	Subject
13:30-14:15	Arithmetic	13:15-14:00	13:00-13:45	Chinese (or English I)
14:45-15:30	English (or English I)	14:40-15:25	14:35-15:20	Arithmetic
16:00-16:45	Chinese (or English II)	16:05-16:50	16:10-16:55	English (or English II)

Each paper contains large amounts of questions with the intend of making most students unable to complete the entire paper. (For example, the 1963 arithmetic paper has 92 questions. The average answering time for each question is less than half a minute.)

Initially, students who took part in the examination were chosen by primary schools. The maximum percentage of students that could be chosen by each school is double of students in that school that entered secondary schools last year or 60%, whichever is larger. Examination takers must not be 14 or more years old on 31 August on the year of the examination unless they were recommended by the principal. (14 was the minimum working age at that time in Hong Kong.) Students could not repeat the examination. From 1970, all primary school graduates were allowed to take the examination, but the age and repeat requirements were unchanged.

The rank was determined by the sum of adjusted scores of each subject. The grades of each subject could be classified in nine classes. The first class was the best, while the ninth class was the worst. Students who obtained the sixth class or better passed the examination. The results of place allocation were announced in mid July. Students could obtain X1~3 or Y1~3 level. The X levels were given five-year secondary school places, while the Y levels were given three-year secondary places. Others were not allocated places.

From 1962 to 1964, each paper was separated into two parts. The first part can only be done in the first 20 minutes, while the latter part can only be done in the last 25 minutes. From 1965, each paper was no longer separated into parts. From 1969, multiple choice questions that were marked by computers were added, and each paper was separated into the A and B sections. The A section contained multiple choice questions with five options while the B section contained conventional questions. In the same year, the Hong Kong Certificate of Education Examination also adopted multiple choice questions for the first time.

== Protests ==
In 1973, due to the unresolved salary problems, teachers initiated protest actions. After supervising the examination, teachers distributed "a letter to examination takers" (Chinese: 給升中試考生的信) and "the examination is bad" (Chinese: 升中試，壞制度) in red on white stickers. The letter heavily criticised the examination for forcing students to revise for a long time, depriving their happy childhood, and harming their health. It also criticised that the teachers were forced to train students for the examination and were harmed as well. It also requested the government to build more government schools in five years so that all primary school graduates can enter secondary schools and the examination can be disestablished.

== Adoption of metric units ==
Before 1974, arithmetic used imperial units and Chinese units so calculations were complicated. For example:

- 1966 arithmetic questions
  - 35th question (Chinese units): Multiply 2 zhàng by 2.7 and 4 chǐ. Answer: 6 zhàng, 4 chǐ, and 8 cùn.
  - 40th question (Chinese units): What is the average weight of 1 picul and 12 catty, 2 picul, and 2 picul and 16 catty? Answer: 1 picul and 76 catty.
  - 53rd question (imperial units): The area of a triangle is respectively 1 square yard and 1 square foot. The height is 2 feet. What is its base length? Answer: 3 yards and 1 foot
  - 63rd question (imperial units): If 1 gallon of water weights 10 pounds, how heavy is 1 pint of water Answer: 1 pound and 4 ounces.

Due to Hong Kong promoting the use of metric units in the 1970s, from 1975, arithmetic fully used metric units.

In the first few years of the examination, as pound sterling had not undergone decimalisation, even though Hong Kong does not use pounds, arithmetic tested students' ability of calculating with pounds. For example:

- 1963 arithmetic questions
  - 24th question: Multiply 1 pounds, 3 shillings, and 4 pence by 36. Answer: 42 pounds.
  - 24th question: What is two-thirds of 1 pound? Answer: 13 shillings and 4 pence.
  - 52nd question: If 16HKD equals to 1 pound, how much money in pound sterling can 30HKD be exchanged for? Answer: 1 pound, 17 shillings, and 6 pence.

== Disestablishment ==
The last examination was held on 3 May 1977. Starting from 1978, the government has implemented 9-year free education scheme and the examination was disestablished. The first Hong Kong Academic Aptitude Test was held on 6 December 1977. It replaced this examination.

== See also ==
- Joint Primary 6 Examination
- Secondary School Places Allocation
- Hong Kong Academic Aptitude Test
- Hong Kong Certificate of Education Examination
