= Raymond Briggs (British Army officer) =

British Army general (1895–1985)

Major-General Raymond Briggs CB DSO
- Briggs in 1946
- Born: 19 January 1895; Blundellsands, Lancashire, England
- Died: 4 April 1985 (aged 90); London, England
- Military career
- Allegiance: United Kingdom
- Branch: British Army
- Service years: 1914–1947
- Rank: Major-General
- Service number: 10544
- Units: King's Regiment (Liverpool); King's Own Royal Regiment (Lancaster); Machine Gun Corps; Royal Tank Regiment
- Commands: 1st Armoured Division (1942–43); 2nd Armoured Brigade (1940–42)
- Conflicts: First World War; Second World War
- Awards: Companion of the Order of the Bath; Distinguished Service Order; Mentioned in Despatches (2)

Major-General Raymond Briggs, CB, DSO (19 January 1895 – 4 April 1985) was a senior British Army officer who fought in both the First and Second World Wars. During the latter he led the 1st Armoured Division at the Second Battle of El Alamein in late 1942, and throughout the subsequent Tunisian campaign.

== Military career ==
Briggs served in the First World War with the British Army's Machine Gun Corps, receiving his commission in 1915.

Briggs remained in the army during the interwar period, transferring to the Tank Corps (later the Royal Tank Regiment) and attended the Staff College, Camberley from 1925 to 1926. He was appointed Deputy Assistant Director for Mechanized Warfare at the War Office in 1936, and from 14 October 1937 became a GSO2 at the War Office. He was promoted to brevet major on 1 January 1933 brevet lieutenant-colonel on 1 July 1938, and returned to the Staff College to become an instructor in armoured warfare.

Briggs served in the Second World War as a General Staff Officer (GSO), before being promoted to acting brigadier and becoming the commander of the 2nd Armoured Brigade, part of the 1st Armoured Division in December 1940. He was promoted to colonel on 12 August 1941, with seniority backdated to 1 July 1941. As commander of this brigade he participated in the First Battle of El Alamein. He was then awarded the Distinguished Service Order (DSO) on 13 August 1942 and promoted to acting major-general on 21 August and appointed General Officer Commanding (GOC) of the 1st Armoured Division. He commanded the division during the Second Battle of El Alamein and was mentioned in despatches. He also received the Companion of the Order of the Bath (CB) for his role in the battle.

Brigg's rank of major-general was made temporary on 21 August 1943. He continued to command the division throughout the Tunisian campaign, which ended in May 1943, and he was again mentioned in dispatches on 24 June 1943. With the conclusion of the campaign, he was dismissed by his superior, General Sir Bernard Montgomery, the Eighth Army commander. This was followed by an appointment, in July, to become the Director of the Royal Armoured Corps at the War Office. He continued in this role until he retired from the army, with the honorary rank of major-general on 25 March 1947.

== Bibliography ==
- Mead, Richard (2007). Churchill's Lions: a biographical guide to the key British generals of World War II. Stroud (UK): Spellmount. ISBN 978-1-86227-431-0.
- Smart, Nick (2005). Biographical Dictionary of British Generals of the Second World War. Barnesley: Pen & Sword. ISBN 1844150496.

Military offices
Preceded by Herbert Lumsden	GOC 1st Armoured Division; 1942–1943	Succeeded by Alexander Galloway
