= Interstate 80S =

Interstate 80S may refer to:

- The former name of Interstate 76 (Colorado–Nebraska), an Interstate Highway in Colorado and Nebraska in the United States, until 1975
- The former name of Interstate 76 (Ohio–New Jersey), an Interstate Highway in Ohio, Pennsylvania, and New Jersey in the United States, until 1972
