= Interstate 80N =

Interstate 80N may refer to:

- Interstate 80N (Oregon–Utah), now Interstate 84 (Oregon–Utah)
- Interstate 80N (Iowa), became part of Interstate 680 from 1973 to 2019 and now Interstate 880 in 2019
- Interstate 80N (Ohio), now part of Interstates 90, 480, and 490
- Interstate 80N (Pennsylvania), now part of Interstate 78
