= 2nd Light Cavalry Division =

The French 2nd Light Cavalry Division (2e Division de Cavalerie Légère) was a French Army division active during World War II.

== World War II ==
=== Battle of France ===
During the Battle of France in May 1940 the division contained the following units:

- 3rd Cavalry Brigade (3e Brigade de Cavalerie)
  - 18th Mounted Hunters Regiment (18e Régiment de Chasseurs à Cheval)
  - 5th Cuirassier Regiment (5e Regiment de Cuirassier)
- 12th Light Mechanized Brigade (12e Brigade Légère Mécanisée)
  - 2nd Armoured Car Regiment (2e Régiment de Voitures Blindées)
  - 3rd Mechanized Dragoon Regiment (3e régiment de dragons portés)
- 73rd Divisionary Light Cavalry Artillery Regiment (73e Régiment d’Artillerie de Division Légère de Cavalerie)
