= And Another Thing =

And Another Thing may refer to:

- And Another Thing... (album), a 2000 Graham Gouldman album
- And Another Thing... (novel), a 2009 novel by Eoin Colfer and part six in The Hitchhiker's Guide to the Galaxy "trilogy"
- And Another Thing, a 2007 album by Messiah J and the Expert
- The blog of radio host Dave Thompson
- And Another Thing, a 2005 book by Jeremy Clarkson
