= HLA-A80 =

Human leukocyte antigen serotype

- (MHC Class I, A cell surface antigen)
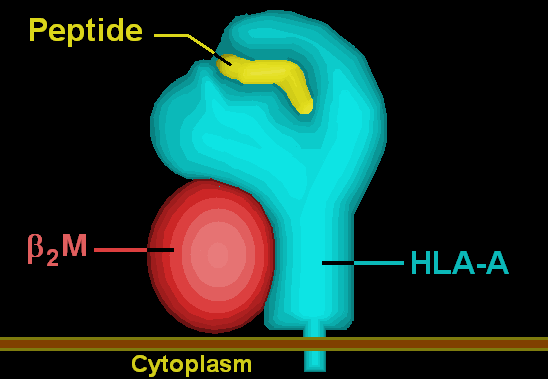
- HLA-A80

About
- Protein: transmembrane receptor/ligand
- Structure: αβ heterodimer
- Subunits: HLA-A*8001, β_{2}-microglobulin
- Older names: AX"BG"

Subtypes
Subtype	allele	Available structures
A*80	*8001	
{{{cNick2}}}	*80{{{cAllele2}}}	
{{{cNick3}}}	*80{{{cAllele3}}}	
{{{cNick4}}}	*80{{{cAllele4}}}	
- Alleles link-out to IMGT/HLA database at EBI

HLA-A80 (A80) is a human leukocyte antigen serotype within HLA-A serotype group. The serotype is determined by the antibody recognition of α^{80} subset of HLA-A α-chains. For A80, the alpha "A" chain are encoded by the HLA-A*80 allele group and the β-chain are encoded by B2M locus. This group currently is dominated by A*8001. A80 and A*80 are almost synonymous in meaning.

A80 is more common in West Central Africa. A80 is the least common HLA-A allele group.

== Serotype ==
A80 recognition of some HLA A*80 gene products
A*80	A80	A10	Sample
allele	%	%	size (N)
*8001	36	10	505

A80 HLA-A80 typing is poor. Most typing is done with SSP-PCR. Most of 8001 are detected with "Blank" serotype..

== Distribution ==
HLA A*8001 frequencies
- Study population: Freq. (in %)
- Senegal Niokholo Mandenka: 3.8
- Zambia Lusaka: 2.3
- Cameroon Bamileke: 1.9
- Mali Bandiagara: 1.5
- South Africa Tswana: 1.2
- Spain Menorca: 1.1
- Cameroon Bakola Pygmy: 1.0
- Burkina Faso Fulani: 1.0
- Trinidad Africans: 1.0
- Tunisia: 1.0
- Bulgaria: 0.9
- Cape Verde Southeastern I…: 0.8
- Guinea Bissau: 0.8
- USA African Americans: 0.8
- Peru Arequipa: 0.7
- Turkey class I: 0.7
- Cameroon Beti: 0.6
- Spain Catalonia Girona: 0.6
- USA Caucasians (3): 0.6
- Brazil: 0.5
- Brazil Belo Horizonte: 0.5
- Brazil Pernambuco State: 0.5
- Croatia pop2: 0.5
- Guatemala Mayans: 0.4
- Mongolia Buriat: 0.4
