= Academic Aptitude Test =

Standardised, area-wide benchmarking examination conducted by the Education Department

- Traditional Chinese: 香港學業能力測驗
Transcriptions
Yue: Cantonese
- Yale Romanization: Hēung góng hohk yihp nàhng lihk chāk yihm
- Jyutping: Hoeng1 gong2 hok6 jip6 nang4 lik6 cak1 jim6

HKAAT
- Traditional Chinese: 學能測驗
Transcriptions
Yue: Cantonese
- Yale Romanization: Hohk nàhng chāk yihm
- Jyutping: Hok6 nang4 cak1 jim6

The Academic Aptitude Test (AAT; 學業能力測驗) was a public examination used in Hong Kong from 1978 to 1994 to assess students’ general abilities for secondary school placement. The candidates of the test were students studying in the sixth grade of primary schools. It was used to assist in the allocation of students to high schools, so the AAT had a significant impact on the educational system in Hong Kong at that time and on the public's perception of academic ability.

Before the abolishment of the test in 1994, this test, together with the Hong Kong Certificate of Education Examination and the Hong Kong Advanced Level Examination, was known as the three major public examinations in Hong Kong. This test is designed to assess students' general learning potential rather than their mastery of school subjects. The following sections discuss its history, structure, administration, and the social impact and criticisms surrounding the test.

== History ==
The test was designed to create a common ground in measuring different school systems and began in 1978 as part of the Secondary School Places Allocation (SSPA) scheme. HKAAT aimed to test student logic, reasoning, and classification ability. As part of the education reform, the Hong Kong government has for the first time introduced AAT to replace the previous subjective teacher recommendation policy. The aim is to create a fairer and more standardized method for the placement of middle school students.

In 1994, the government decided to abolish AAT. This was done to reduce students' stress and address the educational competition inequality issues that had arisen over the past 20 years, while implementing a more comprehensive new assessment policy.

== Structure ==
The Academic Aptitude Test (AAT) consists of three sections: verbal reasoning, numerical reasoning, and logical reasoning. The verbal section uses short reading passages to assess students' understanding of logic, analogy, and reasoning; the numerical section tests students' understanding of model identification and quantitative problems; the logical reasoning section requires students to identify visual sequence rules and logical relationships. In summary, the goal of the AAT is to measure students' general intellectual potential, rather than their mastery of specific school subjects. The content and structure of the AAT examination emphasize reasoning ability and the ability to solve logical problems, rather than memory ability or academic mastery, which raises the question of how the AAT can effectively achieve fair distribution of educational resources in Hong Kong secondary schools.

== Administration and Scoring ==
The AAT was administered annually by the Hong Kong Examinations Authority to all Primary Six students. The results were standardized across schools and used by the government’s Secondary School Places Allocation (SSPA) system to determine placement in secondary schools. Scores were expressed as percentiles rather than grades, allowing comparison across districts. Teachers and parents were not informed of detailed scores to prevent ranking pressure, although this policy later became a point of controversy.

== Criticism and impact ==
The original purpose of the Academic Ability Aptitude Test (AAT) was to replace the teacher recommendation system and promote fairness in secondary school admissions. However, it also sparked many controversies and was eventually abolished in 1994. Critics argued that AAT exacerbated competition and pressure among students, as its results significantly influenced future learning opportunities. Families with better economic and educational resources could better prepare their children, resulting in unequal outcomes. Further, some researchers pointed out that students' cognitive abilities and academic performance are influenced by parents' expectations and socioeconomic factors. These issues have drawn increasing public criticism, and the government eventually abolished AAT in 1994. After the abolition of the AAT, Hong Kong adopted continuous and school-based assessment to alleviate students' examination pressure and promote a balanced educational environment that has persisted to this day.
