= Admiral Buller =

Admiral Buller may refer to:

- Alexander Buller (1834–1903), British Royal Navy admiral
- Sir Edward Buller, 1st Baronet (1764–1824), British Royal Navy vice admiral
- Francis Alexander Waddilove Buller (1879–1943), British Royal Navy rear admiral
- Henry Buller (1873–1960), British Royal Navy admiral
