= Alexander Buller Turner =

British Army officer and English recipient of the Victoria Cross

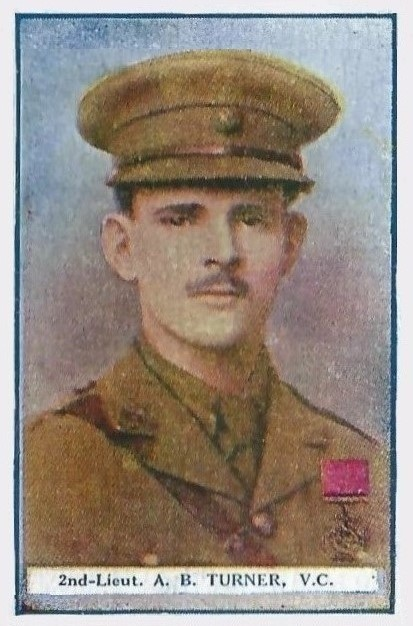
- Turner on a cigarette card
- Born: 22 May 1893; Reading, Berkshire, England
- Died: 1 October 1915 (aged 22); Chocques, France
- Burial place: Chocques Military Cemetery
- Relatives: Victor Buller Turner VC (brother)
- Military career
- Allegiance: United Kingdom
- Branch: British Army
- Service years: 1914−1915
- Rank: Second Lieutenant
- Unit: Royal Berkshire Regiment
- Conflicts: First World War †
- Awards: Victoria Cross

Second Lieutenant Alexander Buller Turner VC (22 May 1893 − 1 October 1915) was a British Army officer and an English recipient of the Victoria Cross (VC) during the First World War, the highest and most prestigious award for gallantry in the face of the enemy that can be awarded to British and Commonwealth forces. His younger brother, Victor, was a recipient of the VC in the Second World War.

== Early life and military career ==
Turner was born at home in Reading, Berkshire on 22 May 1893 to Charles Turner, later a major in the Royal Berkshire Regiment, and his second wife Jane Elizabeth, only daughter of Admiral Sir Alexander Buller. He was educated at Parkside School, Surrey and Wellington College, Berkshire and commissioned into the Special Reserve of Officers, Royal Berkshire Regiment, 3rd (Reserve) Battalion, on 11 September 1914, five weeks after the outbreak of the First World War. He was subsequently transferred to the 1st Battalion, Royal Berkshire Regiment. The battalion, a Regular Army unit, part of the 6th Brigade of the 2nd Division, was serving in trenches of the Western Front.

He was 22 years old, and a second lieutenant in the 3rd Battalion, Royal Berkshire Regiment (Princess Charlotte of Wales's), British Army, attached to 1st Battalion during the First World War when the following deed took place for which he was awarded the VC:

On 28 September 1915 at Fosse 8, near Vermelles, France, when the regimental bombers could make no headway, Second Lieutenant Turner volunteered to lead a new bombing attack. He made his way down the communication trench practically alone, throwing bombs incessantly with such dash and determination that he drove off the Germans about 150 yards without a check. His action enabled the reserves to advance with very little loss and subsequently covered the flank of his regiment in its retirement, thus probably averting the loss of some hundreds of men. Second Lieutenant Turner died three days later of the wounds received in this action.

He was shot in the abdomen at close range during the action for which he was awarded the VC. He was reported to have died at No. 1 Casualty Clearing Station, Chocques on 1 October and he was buried at the Military Cemetery Chocques.

His brother was Lieutenant Colonel Victor Buller Turner VC and had a family connection with General Sir Redvers Buller VC.

His Victoria Cross is displayed at the Royal Gloucestershire, Berkshire and Wiltshire Regiment (Salisbury) Museum, Salisbury, Wiltshire.

The citation for his award, published in the London Gazette on 18 November 1915, reads as follows:

Second Lieutenant Alexander Buller Turner, 3rd Battalion (attached 1st Battalion), Princess Charlotte of Wales's (Royal Berkshire Regiment).
For most conspicuous bravery on 28th September, 1915, at " Fosse 8," near Vermelles. When the regimental bombers could make no headway in Slag Alley, Second Lieutenant Turner volunteered to lead a new bombing attack: He pressed down the communication trench practically alone, throwing bombs incessantly with such dash and determination that he drove back the Germans about 150 yards without a check. His action enabled the reserves to advance with very little loss, and subsequently-covered the flank of his regiment in, its retirement, thus probably averting a loss of some hundreds of men.
This most gallant Officer has since died of wounds received in this action.

He is buried at the Chocques Military Cemetery in France. His medals are held by The Rifles Museum in Winchester.

== Bibliography ==
- Batchelor, Peter; Matson, Christopher (2011). The Western Front 1915. VCs of the First World War. The History Press. ISBN 978-0-7524-6057-4.
