= Alexander Buller =

Royal Navy Admiral (1834–1903)

Admiral Sir Alexander Buller GCB
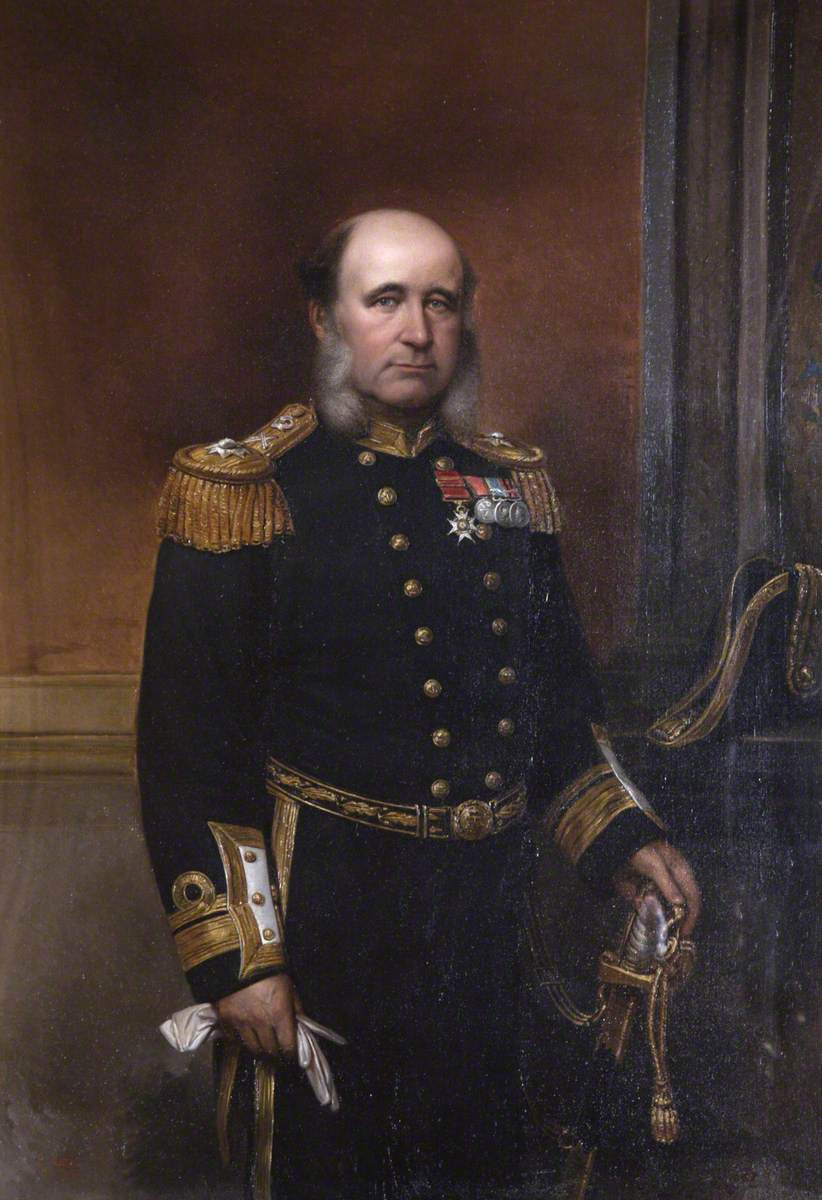
- Buller in 1892, by Giuseppe Calì
- Born: 30 June 1834; Cornwall, England
- Died: 3 October 1903 (aged 69); Exford, Somerset, England
- Burial place: Devon, England
- Military career
- Allegiance: United Kingdom
- Branch: Royal Navy
- Service years: 1848–1899
- Rank: Admiral
- Commands: HMS Modeste; China Station
- Conflicts: Crimean War
- Awards: Knight Grand Cross of the Order of the Bath

Admiral Sir Alexander Buller GCB (30 June 1834 – 3 October 1903) was a Royal Navy officer who went on to be Commander-in-Chief, China Station.

== Early life ==
Alexander Buller was born on 30 June 1834, the second son of Rev. Richard Buller, rector of Lanreath, Cornwall, and his wife, Elizabeth Hornby, daughter of John Hornby of Hook, near Titchfield, Hampshire. His father was from a wealthy and well-connected family with a naval tradition; the rector's father, James Buller, was a Lord of the Admiralty in 1811 and later a Clerk to the Privy Council.

The rectory had previously been occupied by his cousin, another Richard Buller, who had died in 1826 and, having graduated from Oriel College, Oxford with a Bachelor of Arts degree in 1826 (proceeding to Master of Arts in 1829), Richard Buller succeeded his cousin in 1829. He married his wife the following year and he appears to have brought his children up in the rectory, employing a nurse and later a governess to assist in their upbringing and tutoring.

== Naval career ==
Buller joined the Royal Navy in 1848. He served in the Black Sea during the Crimean War. Promoted to Captain in 1869, he was given command of HMS Modeste in 1874. Buller served in the Naval Brigade as part of the Perak expedition to Malaya in 1875. He became Admiral-Superintendent of Malta Dockyard in 1889.

He was appointed Commander-in-Chief, China Station in 1895. Buller had to respond at this time to the Far Eastern Crisis of 1897/98 when the Russian Pacific Fleet was threatening to attack the Korean port of Chemulpo to back up Russia’s demands for a peacetime coaling station at Deer Island. He dispatched eight warships to Korea and the Russian forces promptly retreated. The fact that the Japanese Government had also put three battleships and ten cruisers at his disposal may have also influenced the outcome. He retired in 1899.

Following the succession of King Edward VII, he was among several retired admirals advanced to Knight Grand Cross of the Order of the Bath (GCB) in the 1902 Coronation Honours list published on 26 June 1902, and received the insignia in an investiture on board the royal yacht Victoria and Albert outside Cowes on 15 August 1902, the day before the fleet review held there to mark the coronation.

== Family and later life ==
Admiral Buller married, in 1870, Emily Mary Tritton, a daughter of Henry Tritton of Beddington, Surrey, and had the following issue:

- Jane Elizabeth Buller (born 1871), who married, in 1892, Major Charles Turner of the 49th Royal Berkshire Regiment.
- Admiral Sir Henry Tritton Buller GCVO CB (1873 - 1960).
- Richard Edward Buller (1875 - 1921). Educated at Magdalene College, Cambridge.
- Rear Admiral Francis Alexander Waddilove Buller DSO RN (born 1879) who married, in 1916, Mary Caroline, daughter of Stephen Hammick.
- Lieutenant-Colonel Herbert Cecil Buller (1882 - 1916) who was commissioned into Princess Patricia's Canadian Light Infantry, and died at Hooge, Belgium, on active service in the First World War.
- Edward Maxwell Buller (1883 - 1931). Having fought in France during the First World War, he was discharged from the Army in 1917 due to him being "no longer physically fit for war service", and died at the nursing home at Minehead, Somerset.

Through his daughter, he became grandfather to two Victoria Cross recipients, Alexander Buller Turner and Victor Buller Turner.

He inherited the estate of his uncle, Charles Reginald Buller, which included the family seat of Erle Hall, and died at Exford, Somerset, in 1903, aged 69, having been taken ill while hunting. King George V telegraphed the Admiralty to express his "deep regret" upon hearing of the news of Buller's death.

Military offices
Preceded by Robert Douglas	Admiral Superintendent, Malta Dockyard; 1889–1892	Succeeded by Richard Tracey
Preceded by Sir Edmund Fremantle	Commander-in-Chief, China Station; 1895–1897	Succeeded by Sir Edward Seymour
