= Easebourne =

Village and parish in West Sussex, England

Coordinates: 50.99583°N 0.72601°W

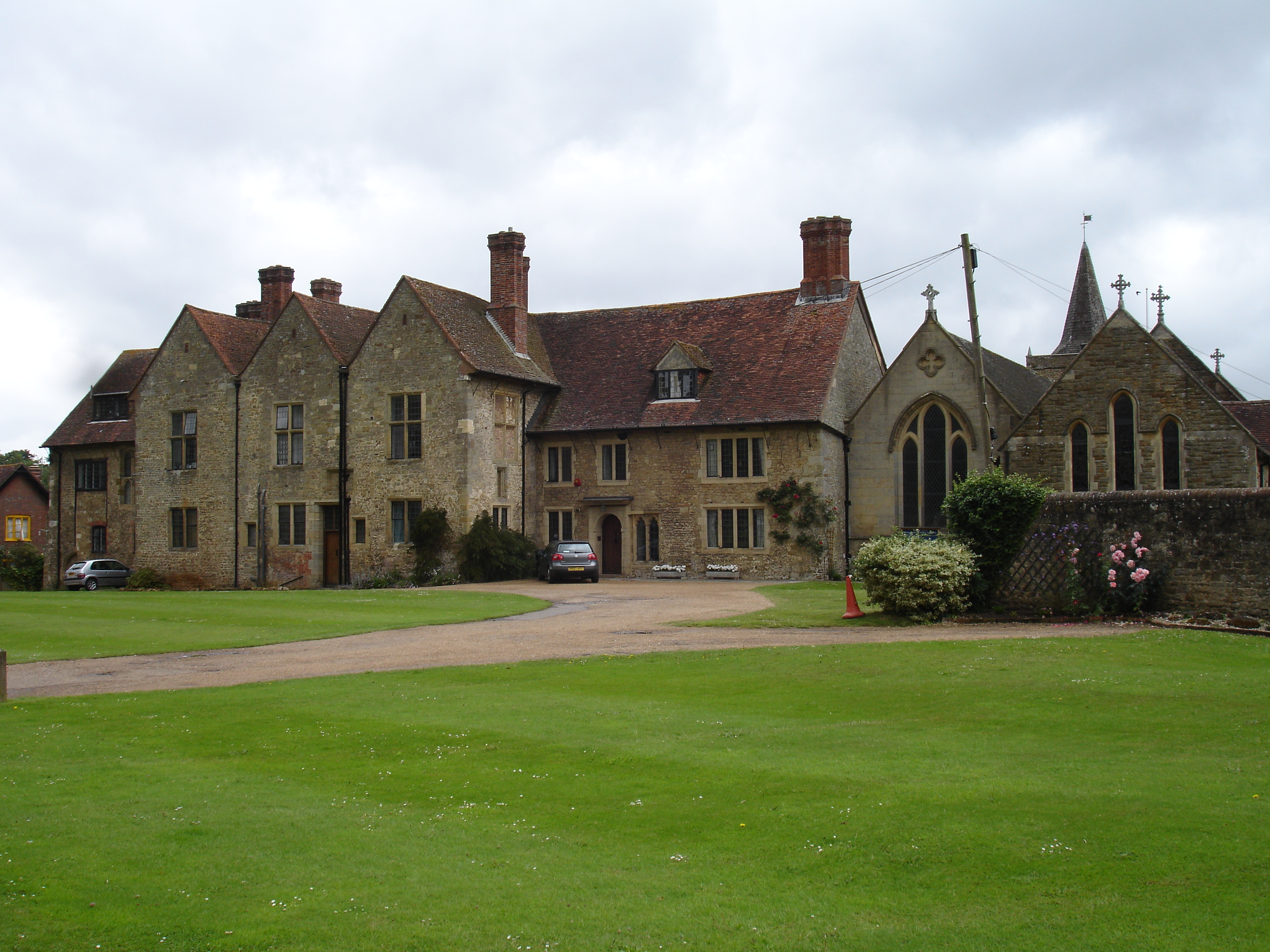
- Easebourne Priory

- Location within West Sussex
- Area: 17.95 km^{2} (6.93 sq mi)
- Population: 1,820. 2011 Census
  - Density: 96/km^{2} (250/sq mi)
- OS grid reference: SU894225
  - London: 44 miles (71 km) NE
- Civil parish: Easebourne
- District: Chichester
- Shire county: West Sussex
- Region: South East
- Country: England
- Sovereign state: United Kingdom
- Post town: MIDHURST
- Postcode district: GU29
- Dialling code: 01730
- Police: Sussex
- Fire: West Sussex
- Ambulance: South East Coast
- UK Parliament: Arundel and South Downs
- Website: http://www.easebourne.org/

Easebourne (/ˈɛzbɔːrn/) is a village, Anglican parish and civil parish in the Chichester District of West Sussex, England. It is half a mile (0.8 km) north of Midhurst, across the River Rother on the A272 and A286 roads. The parish includes the hamlet of Henley to the north. In the 2001 census there were 708 households with a total population of 1,717.

== History ==
Easebourne (Eseburne) was listed in the Domesday Book of 1086 as an ancient Hundred, an extensive area reaching as far afield as Graffham and Cocking to the south, Stedham to the west and Tillington to the east, as well as two hamlets that were not parishes: Todham to the southeast and Buddington to the west; in total it included 12 settlements containing 276 households.

In 1861, the population was 859, and the area of the parish 4,043 acres (1,636 ha).

== Governance ==
An electoral ward of the same name exists. This ward includes Lodsworth and at the 2011 census had a population of 2,492.

== Amenities ==
There is one public house in Easebourne, the White Horse, and one in Henley, the Duke Of Cumberland. The Rother Inn closed in 1994 and the Holly Tree in 2004. Cowdray Park, to the east of the village, has a golf course, and is home to a cricket club and a first-class polo club.

== Parish ==
The parish church of St Mary is 13th century or earlier, and is a Grade I listed building. The parish includes the hamlet of Henley to the north, where there was a Mission Hall established in 1885, since closed. In the 2001 census there were 708 households with a total population of 1,717 of whom 785 were economically active.

== Notable buildings ==
Including the parish church, there are 88 listed buildings in the parish of Easebourne as of June 2026. Many have been described and illustrated by The Midhurst Society.

=== Easebourne Priory ===
Easebourne Priory was built for ten Augustinian canonesses, and was founded before 1238 by the de Bohun family, who were from St. Ann's Hill in nearby Midhurst.

=== Cowdray ruins ===
Adjacent to the cricket ground lie the ruins of the Tudor Cowdray House, built as a mansion with castle features. Started in 1520, it was completed by 1542, but was devastated by fire in 1793. A restoration project in the early 20th century helped to stabilise the ruins.

=== Mill ===
Easebourne mill (also known as North Mill) is two attached buildings—the mill itself is dated 1840 (but probably replaced an earlier mill) and Mill House, dating from the early 19th century. The diverted millstream from the River Rother passes beneath the building, which stands next to the bridge over the river.

=== Bridge ===
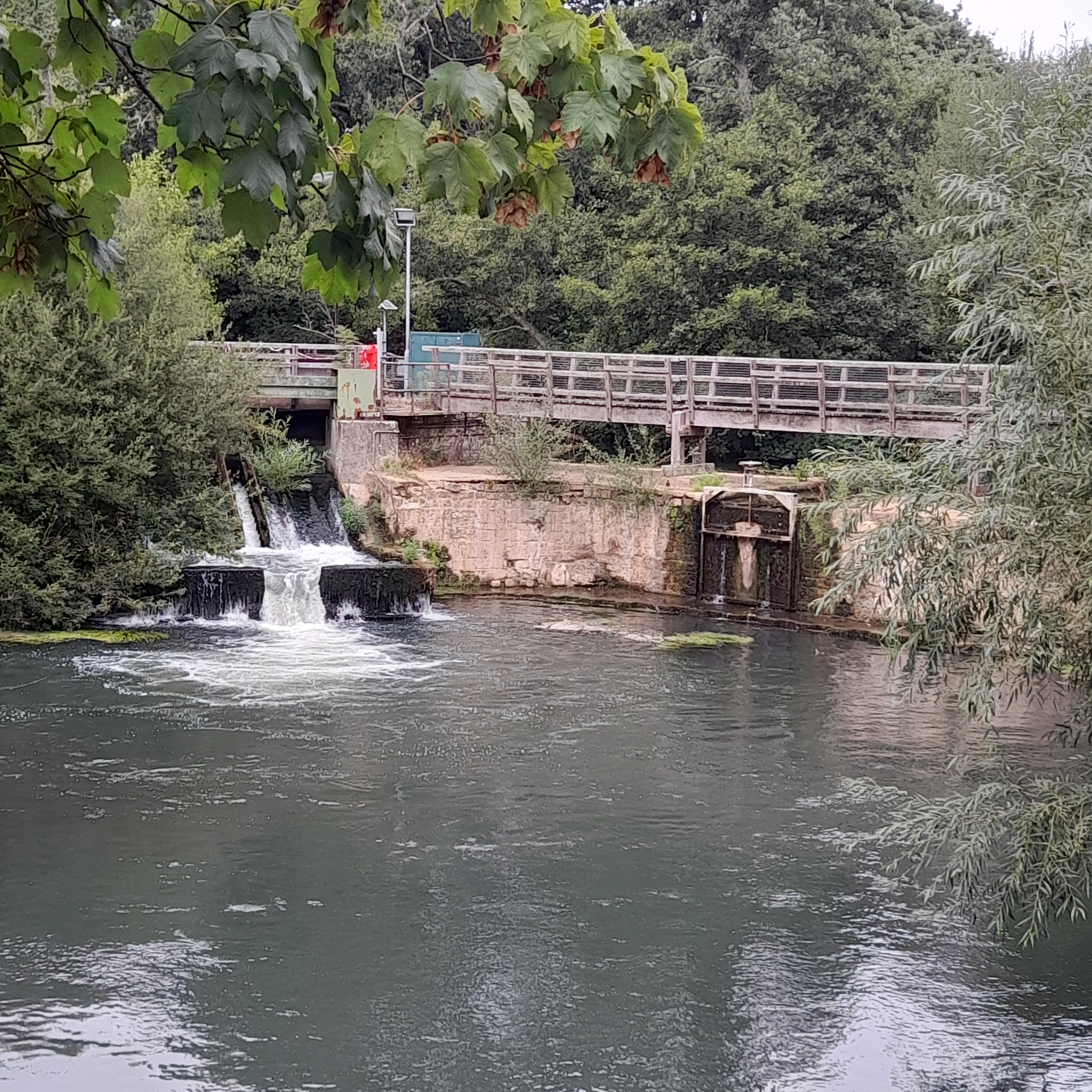
Weir and fish pass on the River Rother during 2026 drought

The ashlar stone bridge over the River Rother, which forms the boundary between Midhurst parish's North Street and Easebourne parish's Easebourne Lane, is a Grade II listed structure, built in 1826 and extended in 1912. Cantilevered out and obscuring much of the old bridge is a modern pedestrian walkway. Upstream of the bridge is a weir with incorporated fish pass.

=== Workhouse ===
On the northern edge of Easebourne village on the A286 road Budgenor Lodge, converted into flats in 2006, is the former Midhurst Union Workhouse, which was opened in 1794 by a Gilbert Union of 17 parishes. From 1835 it was run and enlarged by the Midhurst Poor Law Union, serving 26 parishes.

=== King Edward VII Hospital ===
In the north of the parish, some 2 miles from Easebourne village, is the former hospital and sanatorium now known as King Edward VII Estate. It was founded by King Edward VII in 1906, and funded by Sir Ernest Cassel's provision of £200,000. It was designed mainly by Charles Holden in Tudor style. It is Grade II* listed, as are its chapel, lodge and laundry. The building features long wings of south-facing rooms to maximise patients' exposure to sunlight and fresh air. The design is in keeping with the building's rural setting, with façades in the local tile-hung style. Holden designed the sanatorium's V-shaped open-air chapel so that it could be used for both outdoor and indoor worship. The sanatorium was widely praised for its architecture, but also criticised for its "extravagant planning" by the contemporary medical press. The building influenced the design of subsequent sanatoria, "and also promoted a more domestic character to hospitals generally". The hospital was closed in 2006, with the whole estate subsequently converted to residential use. The main building has been converted into luxury apartments, under leasehold for 175 years from 1 January 2015. Further developments were planned for the 2020s. The chapel was put up for sale (£850,000) or to let, in March 2026.

== Notable people ==
Anti-apartheid activist Helen Joseph was born in the village in 1905. Rear-Admiral Francis Buller lived in Easebourne in retirement. Actors Laurence Fox and Billie Piper were married in St Mary's Church in 2007.

Boris Karloff, British horror actor of screen and stage, died in King Edward VII Hospital from pneumonia at the age of 81 in 1969. Alec Guinness, star of stage and screen, died in King Edward VII Hospital in 2000.
