= Francis Alexander Waddilove Buller =

Francis Alexander Waddilove Buller DSO
- Born: 1879
- Died: 1943 (aged 63–64)
- Military career
- Allegiance: United Kingdom
- Branch: Royal Navy
- Service years: 1898–1922
- Rank: Rear-Admiral
- Awards: Distinguished Service Order (DSO)

Rear-Admiral Francis Alexander Waddilove Buller, DSO (1879 – 14 July 1943) was a flag officer in the British Royal Navy.

== Biography ==
Francis Alexander Waddilove Buller was born in 1879, the son of Admiral Sir Alexander Buller, GCB, RN; he was the brother of Admiral Sir Henry Tritton Buller, GCVO, CB, RN. In 1916, he married Mary Caroline, daughter of Stephen Hammick.

Buller was commissioned into the Royal Navy as a Sub-Lieutenant from 15 July 1898. He was promoted to commander in 1913, and served during the First World War. He was awarded with the Distinguished Service Order (DSO) in 1917. That year, he was promoted to captain. He retired in 1922, and was promoted to the rank of rear-admiral in 1929. In retirement, he lived at Park House, Easebourne, and during the Second World War joined the Home Guard, eventually being promoted to captain. He resigned due to illness, and died on 14 July 1943.
