= Victor Buller Turner =

British Army officer and English recipient of the Victoria Cross

- Born: 17 January 1900; Reading, Berkshire, England
- Died: 7 August 1972 (aged 72); Ditchingham, Norfolk, England
- Burial place: St Mary's Churchyard, Ditchingham, Norfolk, England (after cremation in Norwich)
- Relatives: Alexander Buller Turner VC (brother)
- Military career
- Allegiance: United Kingdom
- Branch: British Army
- Service years: 1918−1949
- Rank: Lieutenant-Colonel
- Service number: 17630
- Units: Rifle Brigade (The Prince Consort's Own)
- Commands: 2nd Battalion, Rifle Brigade (The Prince Consort's Own)
- Conflicts: Iraqi Revolt; Second World War
- Awards: Victoria Cross; Commander of the Royal Victorian Order
- Other work: Yeoman of the Guard

Lieutenant-Colonel Victor Buller Turner VC, CVO (17 January 1900 – 7 August 1972) was a British Army officer and an English recipient of the Victoria Cross (VC) during the Second World War, the highest award for gallantry in the face of the enemy that can be awarded to members of British and other Commonwealth forces.

His older brother, Alexander Turner, received a posthumous VC during the First World War.

== Early life ==
Victor Buller Turner was born in Reading, Berkshire on 17 January 1900. He was the son of Major Charles Turner of the Royal Berkshire Regiment of the British Army and his second wife, Jane Elizabeth, the only daughter of Admiral Sir Alexander Buller, a Royal Navy officer. He was the younger brother of Alexander Buller Turner VC and was also related to General Sir Redvers Buller VC.

Turner was educated at Parkside School, Surrey, Wellington College.

== Military career ==
=== 1918–1939 ===
After attending the Royal Military College, Sandhurst, Turner was commissioned as a second lieutenant in the Rifle Brigade (The Prince Consort's Own) in December 1918. He served in the campaign in Iraq in 1919–20, was promoted lieutenant in December 1920, and again to major in July 1938.

=== 1939–1942 ===
Turner was promoted to temporary Lieutenant-Colonel in 1942 while serving in the Middle East, before the action in which he was awarded the VC.

==== Victoria Cross ====
On 27 October 1942, at El Aqqaqir (Kidney feature), Western Desert, Egypt, during the Second Battle of El Alamein, Lieutenant-Colonel Turner was commanding a battalion of the Rifle Brigade. After overcoming a German position, the battalion fought off desperate counter-attacks by 90 tanks, destroying or immobilising more than 50 of them. During the action, one of the 6-pounder guns was left with only one officer and a sergeant, so Colonel Turner joined them as loader, and between them they destroyed another five tanks. Not until the last tank had been repulsed did he consent to having a wound in his head attended to.

The citation for his award was published in the London Gazette on 20 November 1942 and reads as follows:

Major (temporary Lieutenant-Colonel) Victor Buller Turner (17630), The Rifle Brigade (Prince Consort's Own) (Thatcham, Berks).
For most conspicuous gallantry and devotion to duty on the 27th October, 1942, in the Western Desert.
Lieutenant-Colonel Turner led a Battalion of the Rifle Brigade at night for 4,000 yards through difficult country to their objective, where 40 German prisoners were captured. He then organised the captured position for all-round defence; in this position he and his Battalion were continuously attacked from 5.30 a.m. to 7 p.m., unsupported and so isolated that replenishment of ammunition was impossible owing to the concentration and accuracy of the enemy fire.
During this time the Battalion was attacked by not less than 90 German tanks which advanced in successive waves. All of these were repulsed with a loss to the enemy of 35 tanks which were in flames, and not less than 20 more which had been immobilised.
Throughout the action Lieutenant-Colonel Turner never ceased to go to each part of the front as it was threatened. Wherever the fire was heaviest, there he was to be found. In one case, finding a solitary six-pounder gun in action (the others being casualties) and manned only by another officer and a Sergeant, he acted as loader and with these two destroyed 5 enemy tanks. While doing this he was wounded in the head, but he refused all aid until the last tank was destroyed.
His personal gallantry and complete disregard of danger as he moved about encouraging his Battalion to resist to the last, resulted in the infliction of a severe defeat on the enemy tanks. He set an example of leadership and bravery which inspired his whole Battalion and which will remain an inspiration to the Brigade.

Turner's Victoria Cross is displayed at the Royal Green Jackets (Rifles) Museum in Winchester, England.

==== Post-war ====
He lived at Thatcham House before moving to Norfolk after the war and retired from the army in 1949.

In 1950, Turner was appointed to the Royal Household, with a post in the ceremonial King's Bodyguard of the Yeomen of the Guard and rose to be "Clerk of the Cheque and Adjutant" of the Guard in 1955.

He was appointed a Commander of the Royal Victorian Order (CVO) in 1966 in connection with his services to the Royal Household and was promoted to Lieutenant of the Queen's Bodyguard in 1967.
