= Charles Turner (English cricketer) =

English cricketer and British Army officer

Personal information
- Full name: Charles Turner
- Born: 11 March 1862; Gringley-on-the-Hill, Nottinghamshire, England
- Died: 20 May 1926 (aged 64); Thatcham House, Thatcham, Berkshire, England

Domestic team information
- Years: Team
- 1886–1889: Gloucestershire

Career statistics
| Competition | First-class |
|---|---|
| Matches | 3 |
| Runs scored | 33 |
| Batting average | 6.60 |
| 100s/50s | –/– |
| Top score | 17 |
| Balls bowled | 235 |
| Wickets | 3 |
| Bowling average | 39.66 |
| 5 wickets in innings | – |
| 10 wickets in match | – |
| Best bowling | 1/16 |
| Catches/stumpings | 2/– |
- Source: Cricinfo, 11 June 2011

Charles Turner (11 March 1862 – 20 May 1926) was an English cricketer and British Army officer. Turner's batting and bowling styles are unknown. He was born in Gringley-on-the-Hill, Nottinghamshire and died at Thatcham House, Thatcham, Berkshire.

== Cricket ==
Turner made his first-class debut for Gloucestershire against Nottinghamshire in 1886. He played a further first-class match in 1886 against Sussex, before making a final appearance in 1889 against Middlesex. He scored 33 runs in his 3 matches, at a batting average of 6.60, with a high score of 17. He took 3 wickets with the ball, coming at 39.66 runs a piece, with best figures of 1/16.

== Personal life ==
Prior to playing cricket, Turner was commissioned as a second lieutenant into the Royal Berkshire Regiment. Turner was a proficient sketcher and reporter, as reported by his commanding officer on 29 November 1882. The same year he served in the Egyptian campaign. The following year he undertook training at the School of Musketry in Hythe, Kent, where he became qualified to instruct the theory and practice of Musketry. He was promoted major in 1901 and retired from the army in 1902. It was in the latter year that he purchased Thatcham House which was to be his home for the remainder of his life. He was re-employed in the First World War as Railway Transport Officer at Aldershot from 1914 to 1917.

He served in local government in Berkshire. He was a Deputy Lieutenant, was appointed JP for the county in 1905, and was elected to its County Council in 1907, becoming County Alderman in 1923.

Turner was twice married. His first marriage, in 1886, was to Ella, daughter of Charles James Thornton, of Saint Petersburg, Russia. She died as a result of giving birth to a son also named Charles in 1887. Turner remarried, in 1892, to Jane Elizabeth, only daughter of Admiral Sir Alexander Buller. The couple had five children: Alexander, born on 22 May 1893, Victor, born on 17 January 1900, Cecil, Mark and Jane.

Two of their sons who served in the British Army, with both having the distinction of being awarded the Victoria Cross. Alexander was awarded the Victoria Cross for gallantry while serving with the Royal Berkshire Regiment during the Battle of Loos in September 1915 in World War I. He was wounded during the course of his actions, and succumbed to his wounds days later on 1 October 1915. Victor was awarded his Victoria Cross for gallantry while serving with the Rifle Brigade during the Second Battle of El Alamein in World War II, when he was the Commanding Officer (CO) of his regiment's 2nd Battalion. Under his command the battalion fought off desperate counterattacks by 90 tanks, destroying or immobilising more than 50 of them. During the action, one of the 6-pounder guns was left with only one officer and a sergeant, so Colonel Turner joined them as loader, and between them they destroyed another five tanks. Only on three other occasions have brothers been recipients of the Victoria Cross.
