= Thomas Bosvile =

Brigadier Thomas Bosvile CBE DSO* MC
- Born: 19 September 1897
- Died: 8 July 1945 (aged 47)
- Military career
- Allegiance: United Kingdom
- Branch: British Army
- Service years: 1915–1945
- Rank: Brigadier
- Service number: 11877
- Unit: Rifle Brigade (The Prince Consort's Own)
- Commands: 1st Battalion, Rifle Brigade (The Prince Consort's Own); 7th Motor Brigade
- Conflicts: First World War; Second World War
- Awards: Commander of the Order of the British Empire; Distinguished Service Order & Bar; Military Cross

Brigadier Thomas James Bolle Bosvile, CBE, DSO*, MC (19 September 1897 – 8 July 1945) was a British Army officer who served as acting General Officer Commanding 1st Armoured Division during the Second World War.

== Military career ==
Bosvile was commissioned into the Rifle Brigade (The Prince Consort's Own) on 16 June 1915. He saw action during the First World War for which he was awarded the Military Cross. The medal's citation reads:

For conspicuous gallantry and devotion to duty. He led his company forward, unsupported by artillery, and captured an enemy position in spite of strong opposition. He set a magnificent example of determination and initiative.

During the Second World War, he commanded the 1st Battalion, The Rifle Brigade during the Battle of Gazala in North Africa in May 1942 for which he was appointed a Companion of the Distinguished Service Order. He went on to command 7th Motor Brigade and led the Defence of Outpost Snipe on 26 October 1942 during the Second Battle of El Alamein in October 1942: for this he was awarded a bar to his Distinguished Service Order. He briefly served as acting General Officer Commanding 1st Armoured Division from 27 April 1943 until 1 May 1943. After that he served on the staff at the Supreme Headquarters Allied Expeditionary Force for which he was appointed a Commander of the Order of the British Empire.

He died on 8 July 1945, before the end of the war and was buried at Church of St Andrew & St Mary, Pitminster.

== Family ==
Bosvile married Crystal Guina Lucy Jervis on 11 October 1927.
