= HMS Modeste (1873) =

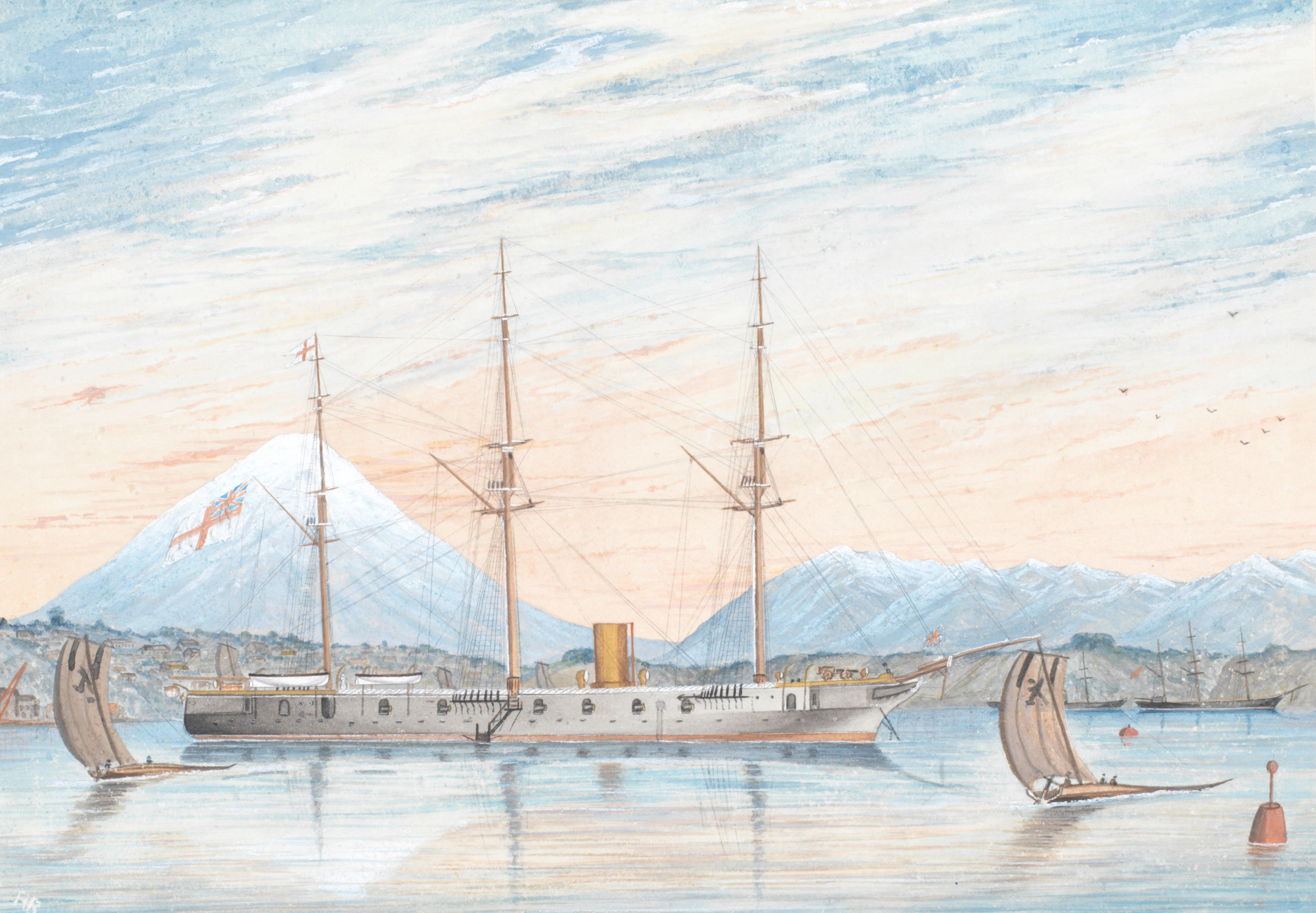
- Modeste, Yokohama, Japan in 1877

History

United Kingdom
- Name: HMS Modeste
- Builder: Devonport Dockyard
- Cost: Approximately £77,000
- Laid down: 27 November 1871
- Launched: 23 May 1873
- Completed: January 1874
- Fate: Sold for scrap, 8 January 1888

General characteristics (as built)
- Class & type: Amethyst-class wooden screw corvette
- Displacement: 1,934 long tons (1,965 t)
- Tons burthen: 1,405 bm
- Length: 220 ft (67.1 m) (p/p)
- Beam: 37 ft (11.3 m)
- Draught: 18 ft (5.5 m)
- Installed power: 2,068 ihp (1,542 kW)
- Propulsion: 1 shaft; 1 × 2-cylinder compound expansion steam engine; 6 cylindrical boilers
- Sail plan: Ship rig
- Speed: 12 knots (22 km/h; 14 mph)
- Range: approximately 2,500 nmi (4,600 km; 2,900 mi) at 10 knots (19 km/h; 12 mph)
- Complement: 225
- Armament: 14 × 64-pounder 71-cwt rifled muzzle-loading (RML) guns

HMS Modeste was an Amethyst-class corvette built for the Royal Navy in the early 1870s. She served in the Perak campaign in the 1870s.

== Bibliography ==
- Ballard, G. A. (1937). "British Corvettes of 1875: The Last Wooden class". The Mariner's Mirror. 23 (October). Cambridge, UK: Society for Nautical Research: 435–45. doi:10.1080/00253359.1937.10657256.
- Colledge, J. J.; Warlow, Ben (2006) [1969]. Ships of the Royal Navy: The Complete Record of All Fighting Ships of the Royal Navy from the 15th Century to the Present (3rd Rev ed.). London: Chatham Publishing. ISBN 978-1-86176-281-8. OCLC 67375475.
- Gardiner, Robert, ed. (1979). Conway's All the World's Fighting Ships 1860-1905. London: Conway Maritime Press. ISBN 0-8317-0302-4.
- Lyon, David & Winfield, Rif (2004). The Sail and Steam Navy List: All the Ships of the Royal Navy 1815–1889. Chatham Publishing. ISBN 978-1-86176-032-6. OCLC 52620555.
