= Henry Buller =

Royal Navy Admiral (1873-1960)

Admiral Sir Henry Buller GCVO CB
- Born: 30 October 1873; Southsea, Hampshire
- Died: 29 August 1960 (aged 86); Netherwood Southwater, Sussex
- Relatives: Admiral Sir Alexander Buller (father)
- Military career
- Allegiance: United Kingdom
- Branch: Royal Navy
- Service years: 1887–1931
- Rank: Admiral
- Commands: Admiral Commanding HM Yachts (1922–31); HMS Malaya (1919–21); HMS Valiant (1918–19); HMS Barham (1918); HMS Highflyer (1913–16); HMS Prince of Wales (1912); HMS Zealandia (1911–12)
- Conflicts: First World War
- Awards: Knight Grand Cross of the Royal Victorian Order; Companion of the Order of the Bath

Admiral Sir Henry Tritton Buller, GCVO, CB (30 October 1873 – 29 August 1960) was a Royal Navy officer, who commanded the Royal Yacht from 1921 to 1931. He served as an Extra Equerry to King George V, and, from 1932 till his death, he was a Groom-in-Waiting to the monarch.

== Early life and family ==
Henry Tritton Buller was born on 30 October 1873, the eldest son surviving into adulthood of Admiral Sir Alexander Buller and his wife, Emily Mary Tritton, daughter of Henry Tritton of Beddington, Surrey. The family were well-connected in the Navy and relatively wealthy, with a tradition of naval service. His father would eventually be appointed Commander-in-Chief, China Station, and his great-grandfather, James Buller, who died in 1830, was a Lord of the Admiralty in 1811 and later a Clerk to the Privy Council.

He married, in 1919, Lady Hermione Moray Stuart, daughter of Morton Gray Stuart, 17th Earl of Moray, and had the following children:

- Pilot Officer Alexander John Stuart Buller (1920–1940) of 101 Squadron, Royal Air Force.
- Commander Robin Francis Buller (1923–1956) of the Royal Navy.
- Peter Henry Buller (born 1926).
- Patricia Moray Buller, known as Lady Ashmore (1929–2013), who married Vice-admiral Sir Peter Ashmore.

Lady Buller died on 9 February 1989.

== Naval career ==
Buller enrolled in the Royal Navy on 15 January 1887. Having been acting in the rank, Buller was confirmed as a sub-lieutenant in 1894, and in 1895 was promoted to lieutenant. He took gunnery and torpedo courses at HMS Defiance during the late summer 1902, and on 1 September that year was posted to the royal yacht HMY Victoria and Albert. In 1904 he was promoted to commander and in 1911 to captain. In 1911, Buller was at the Royal Naval College, Dartmouth, and was appointed a Member of the Royal Victorian Order (MVO).

While under Buller's command, HMS Highflyer chased the German auxiliary cruiser SS Kaiser Wilhelm der Grosse at full speed before engaging with her; the German vessel was subsequently sunk, after approximately an hour of fighting. Buller, his officers and crew, received prize money in 1916 for the sinking. In recognition of his wartime service, he was appointed a Companion of the Order of the Bath (CB) in 1918.

In 1921, he was placed in command of His Majesty's yachts, succeeding Rear Admiral Hon. Sir Hubert George Brand; he relinquished this post in 1931 and was placed on the retired list. He was subsequently appointed an Extra Equerry to King George V. A year later, in 1932, he was appointed a Groom-in-Waiting to the King, succeeding Col. Hon. C.H.C. Willoughby; he would continue to serve in this role under George V and was reappointed under Edward VIII, George VI and Elizabeth II. In recognition of his service to the monarch while commanding the Royal Yacht, Buller was knighted in 1925, being appointed a Knight Commander of the Royal Victorian Order (KCVO), and he was subsequently promoted to the highest grade of that order, Knight Grand Cross (GCVO), in 1930.

== Later life ==
Admiral Buller lived at Netherwood, Southwater, near Horsham, Sussex. He died on 29 August 1960, leaving an estate worth over £71,000, and was buried in St Mary the Virgin churchyard, Shipley, Sussex.

== Bibliography ==
- A.C. Fox-Davies (1929). Armorial Families
